= Japan National Route 205 =

Road in Nagasaki prefecture, Japan

National Route 205
- 国道205号
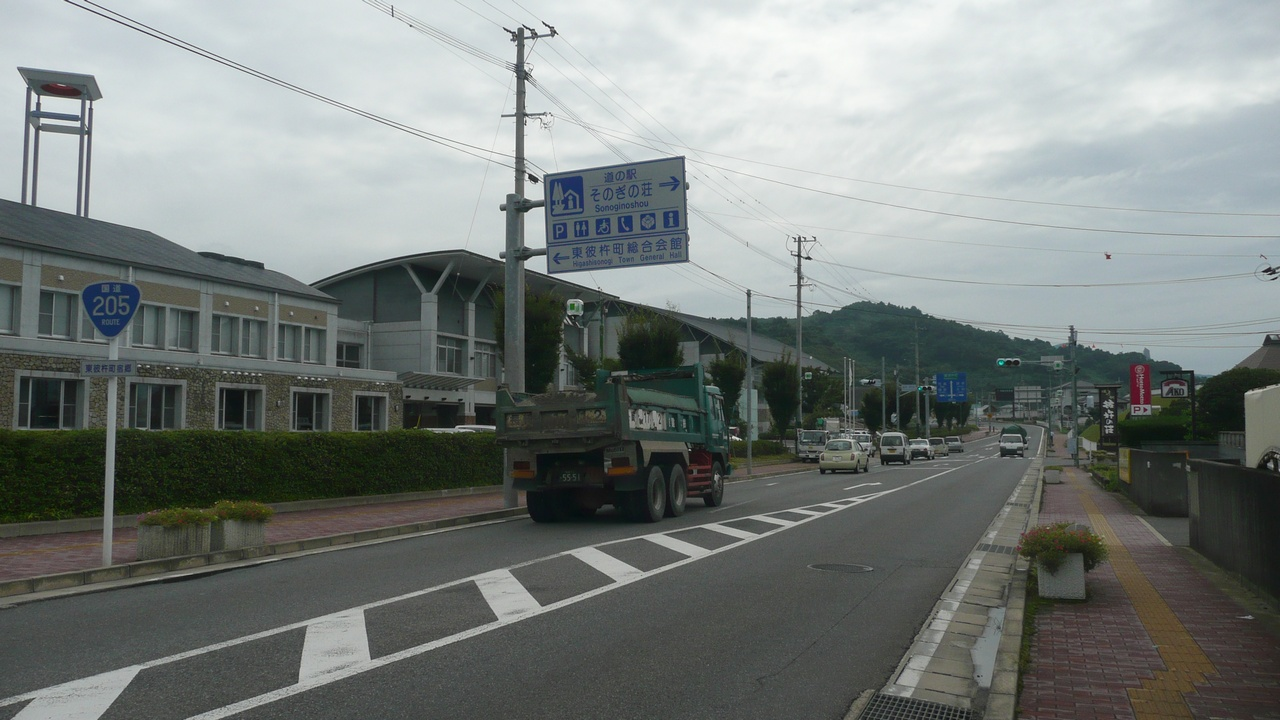

Route information
- Length: 23.2 km (14.4 mi)
- Existed: 18 May 1953–present

Major junctions
- West end: National Route 35 in Sasebo
- Nishi-Kyūshū Expressway; National Route 202
- East end: National Route 34 in Higashisonogi

Location
- Country: Japan

Highway system
- National highways of Japan; Expressways of Japan
← National Route 204	→ National Route 206

National Route 205 is a national highway of Japan connecting Sasebo and Higashisonogi in Japan, with a total length of 23.2 km (14.42 mi).
