= Kunchi =

Kunchi may refer to one of the following:

From Japanese kunchi meaning "festival"

- Nagasaki Kunchi
- Karatsu Kunchi
- Shiota Kunchi, in Shiota, Saga

Personal name

- Lu Kunchi, a Taiwanese football goalkeeper
- Kunchi, also spelled as Kaunchi or Kuwinji of White Horde, a descendant of Genghis Khan

Places

- Kunchi, Bonaire, an abandoned town in Bonaire
