= Kawamura Art Museum =

- 河村美術館
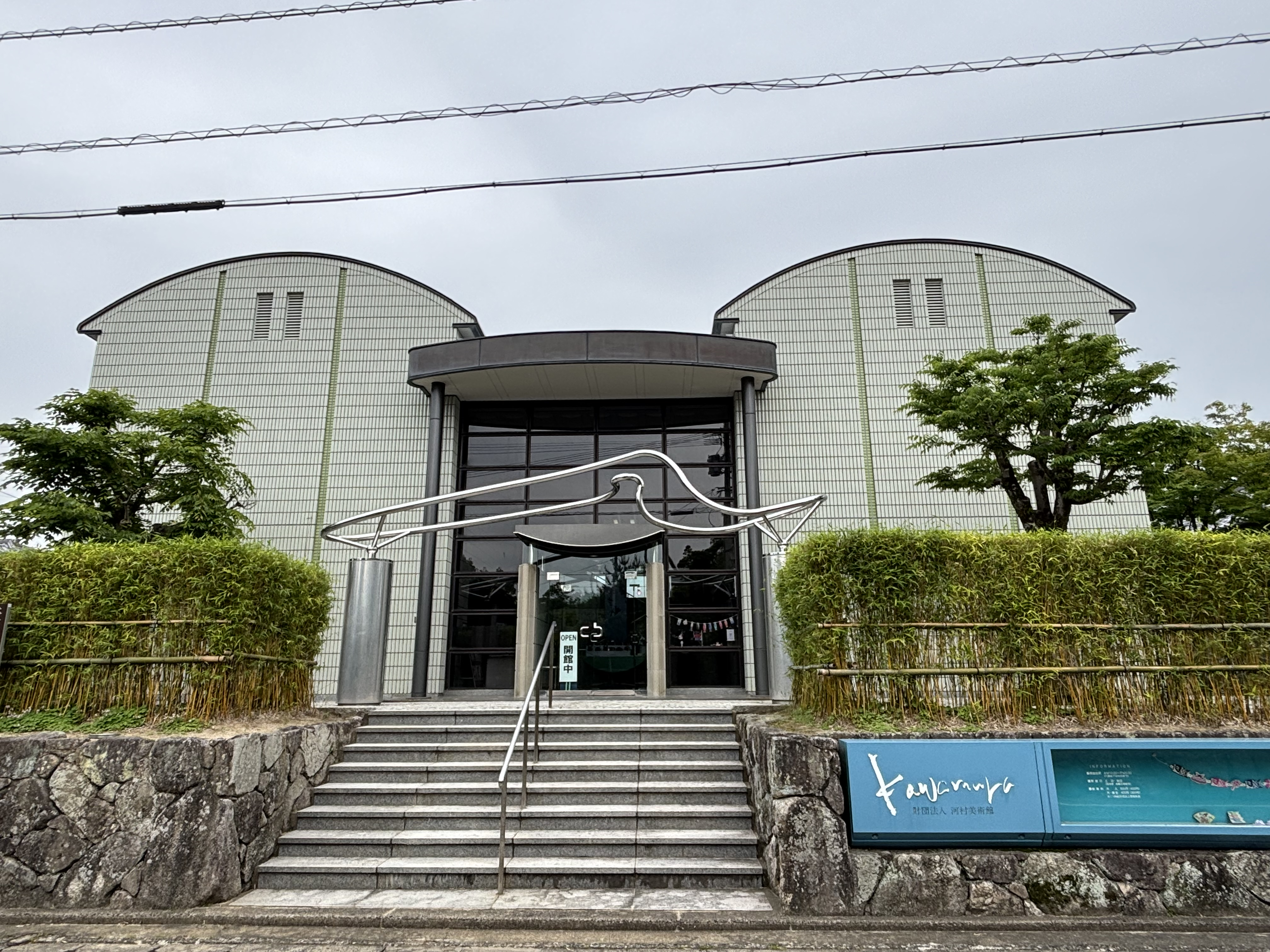
- Kawamura Art Museum
- Interactive map of the Kawamura Art Museum area

General information
- Location: 6-5 Kitajōnai, Karatsu, Saga Prefecture, Japan
- Coordinates: 33°27′12″N 129°58′18″E
- Opened: 1990

Website
- Official website

Kawamura Art Museum (河村美術館, Kawamura Bijutsukan) is art museum in Karatsu, Saga Prefecture, Japan. The collection includes twenty works by Aoki Shigeru as well as paintings by Kuroda Seiki, Wada Eisaku, and Yamashita Shintarō. Temporary exhibitions are also mounted. In 2014 the museum became a Public Interest Incorporated Foundation.

== See also ==
- Saga Prefectural Museum
- Karatsu Castle
- List of Cultural Properties of Japan - paintings (Saga)
