= Japan National Route 35 =

National highway in Japan

National Route 35
- 国道35号

Route information
- Length: 35.2 km (21.9 mi)

Location
- Country: Japan

Highway system
- National highways of Japan; Expressways of Japan
← National Route 34	→ National Route 36

National Route 35 (国道35号, Kokudō sanjūgo-gō) is a national highway connecting Takeo and Sasebo in Japan.

== Route data ==
- Length: 35.2 km (21.9 mi)
- Origin: Takeo, Saga (originates at junction with Route 34)
- Terminus: Sasebo, Nagasaki (ends at the terminal of Route 204)
- Major cities: Arita

== History ==
- 4 December 1952: First Class National Highway 35 (from Takeo to Sasebo)
- 1 April 1965: General National Highway 35 (from Takeo to Sasebo)

== Overlapping sections ==
- From Nishiarita (Imari-guchi intersection) to Sasebo (Tagonoura intersection): Route 202
- In Sasebo, from Tagonoura intersection to the terminus: Route 206

== Municipalities passed through ==
- Saga Prefecture
  - Takeo - Arita
- Nagasaki Prefecture
  - Sasebo

== Intersects with ==
- Saga Prefecture
  - Route 34; at the origin, in Takeo
  - Route 202; from Arita to Sasebo
- Nagasaki Prefecture
  - Routes 205, 206 and 384; at Sasebo City
  - Route 204; at the terminus
