= Karatsu =

City in Saga Prefecture, Japan

Karatsu 唐津市
- City
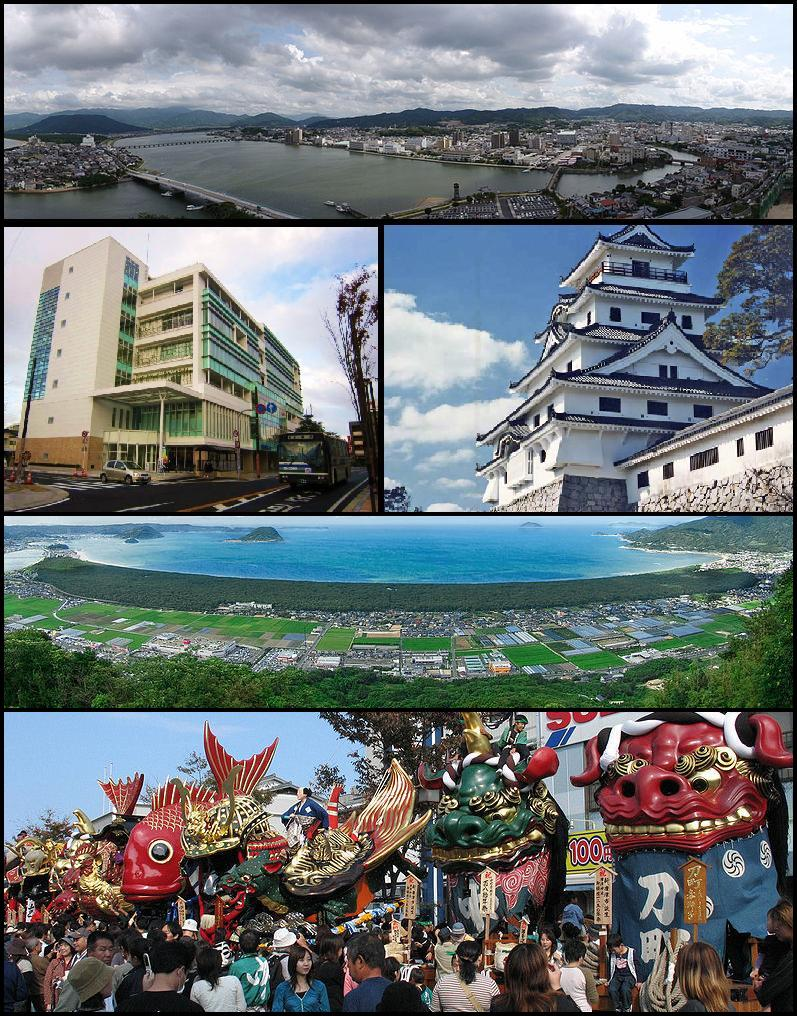
- Top: View of Matsuura River and downtown Karatsu; 2nd left: Oteguchi Bus Terminal, 2nd right:Karatsu Castle; 3rd: Nijinomatsubara pine forest area Bottom: Karatsu Kunchi in November.

- Flag Emblem

- Location in Japan
- Coordinates: 33°27′00″N 129°58′06″E
- Country: Japan
- Region: Kyushu
- Prefecture: Saga

Government
  - Mayor: Tatsurō Mine (from February 2017)

Area
  - Total: 487.58 km^{2} (188.26 sq mi)

Population (1 September 2026)
  - Total: 111,413
  - Density: 228.50/km^{2} (591.82/sq mi)
- Time zone: UTC+09:00 (JST)
- City hall address: 1-1 Nishijōnai, Karatsu-shi, Saga-ken 847-8511
- Climate: Cfa
- Website: Official website
- Symbols
- Flower: Wisteria
- Tree: Pine

Karatsu (唐津市, Karatsu-shi) is a city located in Saga Prefecture on the island of Kyushu, Japan. Its name, formed from the Japanese word roots 唐 kara (China, or continental East Asia in general), and 津 tsu (port), signifies its historical importance as an ancient trading port between Japan with China and Korea. As of 1 September 2026, the city had an estimated population of 111,413 in 51,678 households, and a population density of 228.5 persons per km^{2}. The total area of the city is 487.58 km^{2} (188.26 sq mi). The same Chinese characters are used in the name of the city (唐津市) as for the city of Dangjin in South Chungcheong Province, South Korea.

== History ==
The area of Karatsu was part of ancient Hizen Province. In 1591, on the coast of the northern part of the city (formerly the town of Chinzei), Nagoya Castle was constructed. The following year, it became the location from which the Imjin War was launched by Toyotomi Hideyoshi. In the middle of 1593, Terazawa Hirotaka created Karatsu Domain. In 1602, replacing Nagoya Castle, Karatsu Castle was constructed in what is now the heart of Karatsu.

Following the Meiji restoration, the town of Karatsu and the villages of Hamasaki, Irino, Kagami, Karatsu, Kirigo, Kitahata, Kuri, Kyūragi, Minato, Mitsushima, Nagoya, Nanayama, Ōchi, Ōmura, Onizuka, Sashi, Uchiage and Yobuko were established with the creation of the modern municipalities system. Ōmura was renamed Tamashima on 28 July 1896. Hamasaki was elevated to town status on 1 July 1922. Karatsu annexed Mitsushima on 1 January 1924. Yobuko was elevated to town status on 1 August 1928. Karatsu Village was incorporated into Karatsu Town on 1 January 1932, and on 1 September 1935, both Sashi and Ōchi were elevated to town status. Sashi was subsequently annexed by Karatsu on 11 November 1941. Kyūragi was elevated to town status on 3 May 1952. On 1 November 1954, Karatsu annexed Kagami, Kuri, Minato and Onizuka. Hamasaki and Tamashima were merged to create the town of Hamasaki-Tamashima; and Nagoya and Uchiage were merge to create the town of Chinzei on 30 September 1956. On 1 November 1958, Kirigo was split and its parts were incorporated into Karatsu and Irino (respectively), and Irino was elevated to town status and was renamed Hizen. On 1 November 1966, Hamasaki-Tamashima was renamed Hamatama.

On 1 January 2005, the towns of Chinzei, Hamatama, Hizen, Kyūragi, Ōchi, Yobuko and the village of Kitahata (all from Higashimatsuura District) were merged into Karatsu.

On 1 January 2006, the village of Nanayama (from Higashimatsuura District) was merged into Karatsu.

== Geography ==
Karatsu is located in northern Saga Prefecture. The city area consists of the plains (Karatsu Plain) created by the Matsuura River and Tamashima River, and a hilly basalt plateau called Uwaba. It faces the Sefuri Mountains to the east, Imari Bay to the west, the Kishima Mountains to the south, and the Genkai Sea (Karatsu Bay) to the north, into which the Matsuura River flows. The northwest is a ria coast with many inlets and outlets, and due to its geographical features, this area has been a base for maritime traffic to the continent since ancient times. The city also includes a number of populated offshore islands

- Mountains: Mt. Sakurei (887.1 m), Mt. Hachiman (763.6 m), Mt. Tonbo (535 m)
- Natural Parks: Hachimandake Prefectural Natural Park, Sefuri-Kitayama Prefectural Natural Park, Tenzan Prefectural Natural Park

=== Adjoining municipalities ===
Fukuoka Prefecture

- Itoshima

Saga Prefecture

- Genkai
- Imari
- Saga
- Takeo
- Taku

=== Demographics ===
Per Japanese census data, the population of Karatsu is as shown below.

Historical population
Year	Pop.	±%
1960	173,866	—
1970	141,171	−18.8%
1980	142,224	+0.7%
1990	139,888	−1.6%
2000	134,144	−4.1%
2010	126,926	−5.4%
2020	117,373	−7.5%

=== Climate ===
Karatsu has a humid subtropical climate (Köppen Cfa) characterized by warm summers and cool winters with light to no snowfall. The average annual temperature in Karatsu is 15.6 °C (60.1 °F). The average annual rainfall is 1,760 mm (69.29 in) with September as the wettest month. The temperatures are highest on average in August, at around 26.3 °C (79.3 °F), and lowest in January, at around 5.5 °C (41.9 °F).

Climate data for Karatsu (2010−2020 normals, extremes 2010−present)
Month	Jan	Feb	Mar	Apr	May	Jun	Jul	Aug	Sep	Oct	Nov	Dec	Year
Record high °C (°F)	19.5 (67.1)	22.8 (73.0)	25.7 (78.3)	27.8 (82.0)	32.2 (90.0)	34.0 (93.2)	37.5 (99.5)	37.6 (99.7)	35.8 (96.4)	31.6 (88.9)	28.2 (82.8)	24.8 (76.6)	37.6 (99.7)
Mean daily maximum °C (°F)	10.0 (50.0)	11.2 (52.2)	14.8 (58.6)	19.1 (66.4)	24.0 (75.2)	26.0 (78.8)	30.2 (86.4)	31.7 (89.1)	27.4 (81.3)	22.8 (73.0)	17.8 (64.0)	12.0 (53.6)	20.6 (69.1)
Daily mean °C (°F)	6.3 (43.3)	7.2 (45.0)	10.4 (50.7)	14.5 (58.1)	19.1 (66.4)	22.2 (72.0)	26.4 (79.5)	27.6 (81.7)	23.7 (74.7)	19.0 (66.2)	13.6 (56.5)	8.1 (46.6)	16.5 (61.7)
Mean daily minimum °C (°F)	2.7 (36.9)	3.3 (37.9)	6.3 (43.3)	10.2 (50.4)	14.7 (58.5)	19.3 (66.7)	23.6 (74.5)	24.4 (75.9)	20.7 (69.3)	15.5 (59.9)	9.5 (49.1)	4.5 (40.1)	12.9 (55.2)
Record low °C (°F)	−4.6 (23.7)	−4.3 (24.3)	−1.1 (30.0)	3.2 (37.8)	6.9 (44.4)	13.2 (55.8)	17.4 (63.3)	17.7 (63.9)	12.6 (54.7)	7.8 (46.0)	1.9 (35.4)	−1.0 (30.2)	−4.6 (23.7)
Average precipitation mm (inches)	75.4 (2.97)	85.4 (3.36)	117.0 (4.61)	146.3 (5.76)	125.5 (4.94)	280.0 (11.02)	349.0 (13.74)	314.1 (12.37)	191.3 (7.53)	126.7 (4.99)	85.7 (3.37)	94.6 (3.72)	1,979.3 (77.93)
Average precipitation days (≥ 1.0 mm)	7.8	9.4	9.7	9.3	7.4	11.9	12.5	8.9	11.2	7.4	8.6	9.2	113.3
Mean monthly sunshine hours	111.2	118.0	172.0	186.8	213.4	124.2	175.2	219.7	151.4	166.7	141.3	101.5	1,890.3
Source: JMA

== Government ==
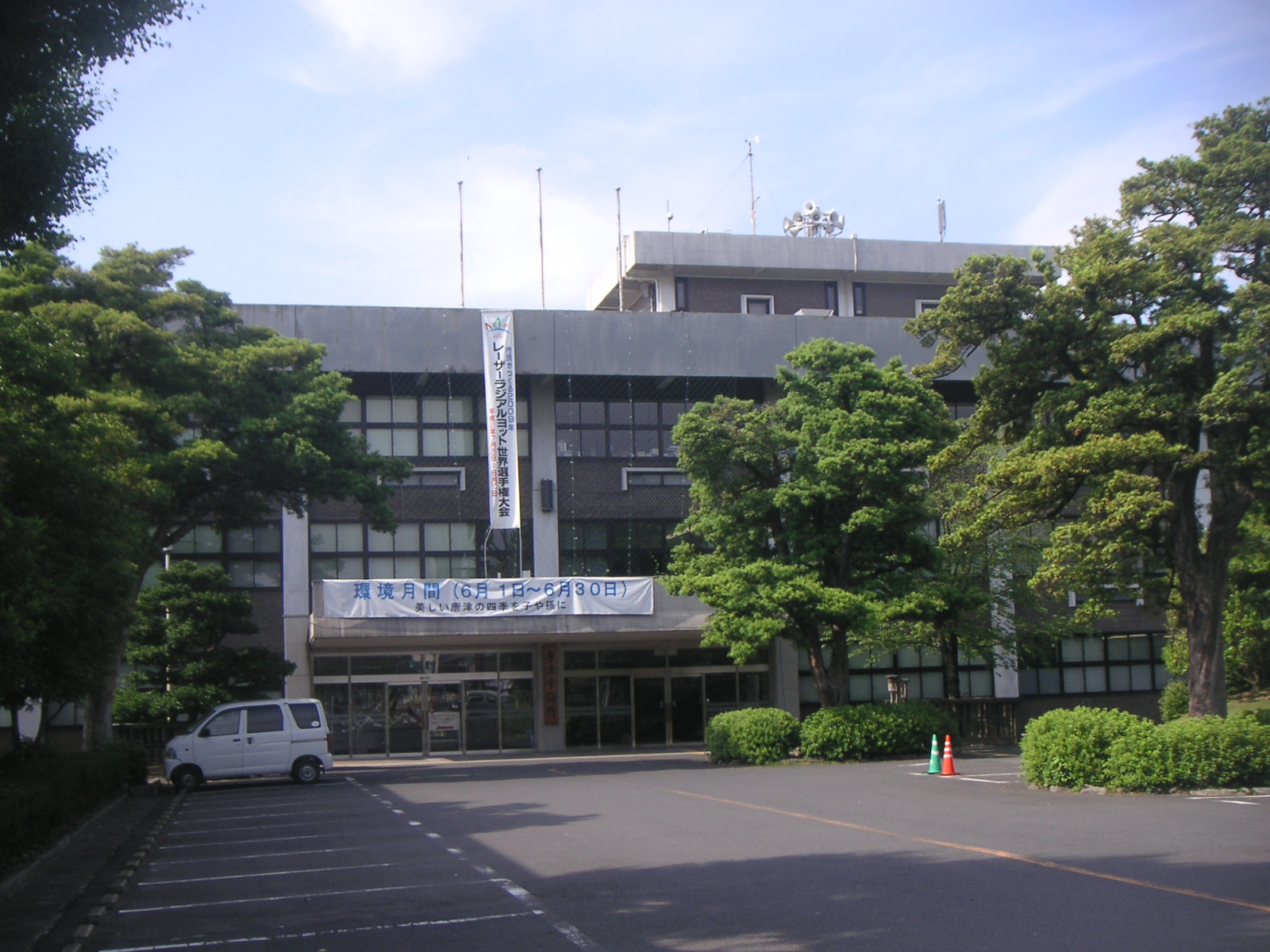
Karatsu City Hall

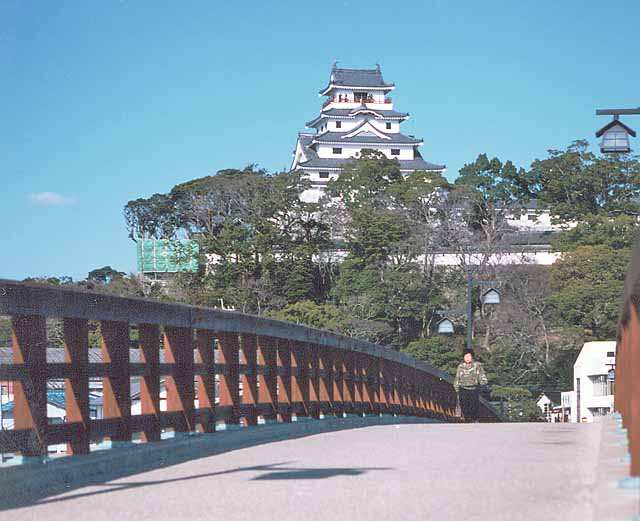
Karatsu Castle

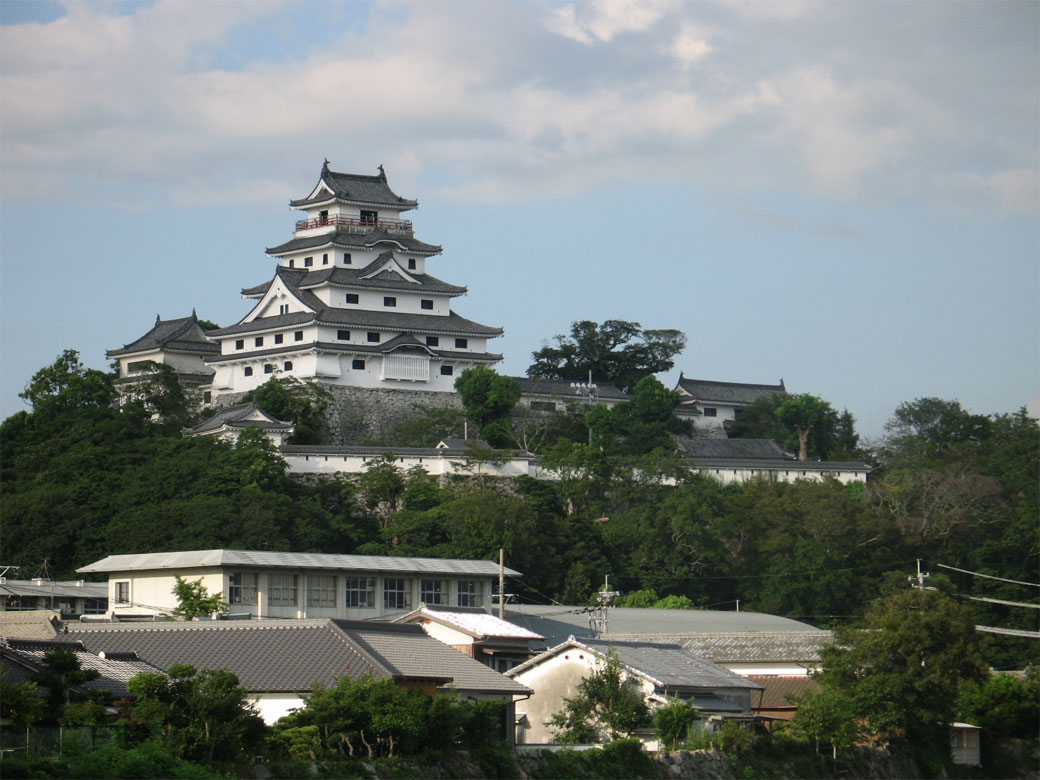
Karatsu Castle overlooks the city of Karatsu

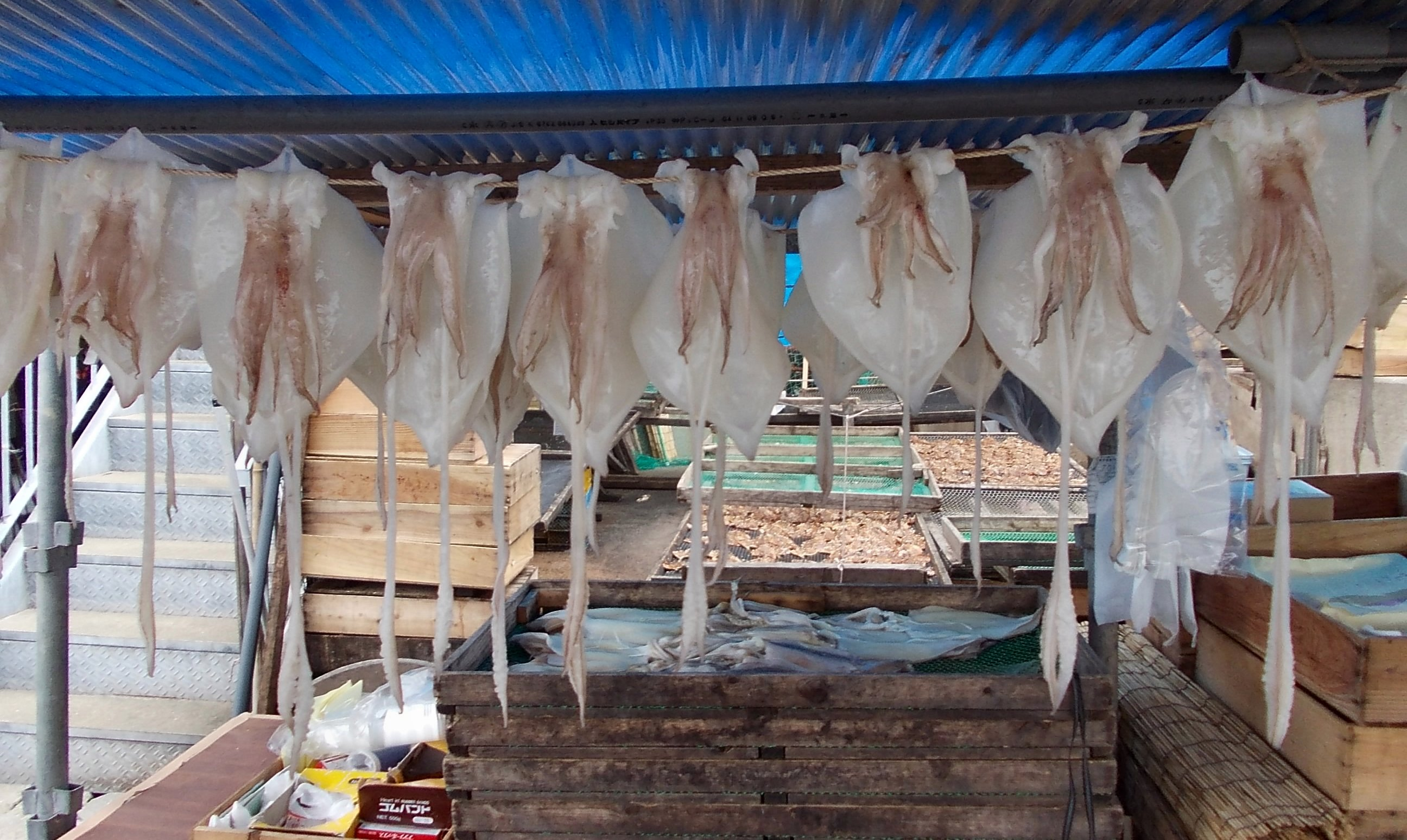
Fresh squid in Yobuko

Karatsu has a mayor-council form of government with a directly elected mayor and a unicameral city council of 28 members. Karatsu contributes six members to the Saga Prefectural Assembly. In terms of national politics, the city is part of the Saga 2nd district of the lower house of the Diet of Japan.

== Local attractions and culture ==
- Kagami Jinja.
- Karatsu Castle
- Karatsu ware pottery
- Kawamura Art Museum
- Matsurokan
- Saga Prefectural Nagoya Castle Museum
- Nijinomatsubara

=== Karatsu Kunchi ===
Karatsu is famous for its Karatsu Kunchi festival (matsuri), which runs annually from 2 November to 4 November and is visited by approximately 500,000 visitors from all over Japan. The festival consists of 14 hikiyama (floats made of many layers of papier-mâché) being carried around the city's narrow streets to calls of "Enya!". Some hikiyama members say "Yoisa!". This accompaniment is one of the 100 Soundscapes of Japan. During Karatsu Kunchi, people in this town open their homes to friends and strangers to eat and drink; the primary focus is enjoying food, beer, and shochu, and having lively conversation.

In 2016 the festival was registered as a UNESCO Intangible Cultural Heritage.

=== Karatsu International Film Festival ===
The Karatsu International Film Festival (KIFF) has been held in the historic Theater Enya each year since 2022, with the 4th edition running from 8 t0 13 July 2025. The festival awards a number of prizes in eligible categories of films, including short films, featurettes, narrative feature films, and documentary feature films. The Grand Prix, or Pandre Award, is worth 200,000 yen as of 2025.

=== Karatsu Rising Sun International Film Festival ===
The Karatsu Rising Sun International Film Festival is part of the Rising Sun International Film Festival, which is held each November in Kitakyushu. Films are screened in the Theater Enya, and a number of film awards are given by the festival.

=== Film location ===
Keisuke Kinoshita's award-winning 1951 film Fireworks over the Sea was both filmed and set in Yobuko.

Nobuhiko Obayashi's 2017 film Hanagatami, made in collaboration with Theater Enya, was set in Karatsu. It won the Grand Prix at the 72nd Mainichi Film Awards, and screened at international film festivals in over 20 countries.

== Economy ==
Karatsu has a diverse economy. The main agricultural products are fruit trees, rice, vegetables, and beef cattle. In the plains of Kagami and Kuri, there are vast rice paddies developed as an ancillary project of the river improvement project in the Edo period. Rice is still the main crop, but due to the rice production reduction policy, there has been a shift to the production of soybeans and other beans, and barley, wheat, and other grains. Large-scale orchards are spread out in the Hamatama area, and greenhouse mandarin oranges are a specialty. The main industrial clusters are the Karatsu Ironworks Complex (Nakahara area), the Karatsu Ishishi Industrial Complex (Ishishi area), and the Kishiyama Industrial Complex (Kitahata Kishiyama area).

== Education ==
Karatsu has 30 public elementary schools and 18 public junior high schools operated by the city government, and one public junior high schools operated by the Saga Prefectural Board of Education. The prefecture also operates a six public high schools and one special education school for the handicapped. There is also one private high school. There is one vocational training school, the Karatsu Maritime Polytechnical School.

== Transport ==
=== Railway ===
JR Kyushu - Karatsu Line

- JK Kyūragi - Iwaya - Ōchi - Honmutabe - Yamamoto - Onizuka - Karatsu - Nishi-Karatsu

JR Kyushu - Chikuhi Line

- JK Hamasaki - Nijinomatsubara - Higashi-Karatsu - Watada - Karatsu

JR Kyushu - Chikuhi Line (West)

- ■ Honmutabe - Hizen-Kubo - Nishi-Ōchi - Sari

=== Highways ===
- Nishi-Kyūshū Expressway
- National Route 202
- National Route 202
- National Route 203
- National Route 204
- National Route 323
- National Route 382

== Sister cities ==
- Reihoku, Kumamoto, Japan
- Seogwipo, South Korea
- Yangzhou, China
- Yeosu, South Korea

== Notable people from Imari ==
- Ken Hisatomi (Footballer)
- Takeshi Kamura (Badminton player)
- Toshiro Miyazaki (Baseball Player)

== In popular culture ==
- Karatsu is the setting for two manga and anime series, Yuri on Ice and Zombieland Saga.
