= Honmutabe Station =

Railway station in Karatsu, Saga Prefecture, Japan

Honmutabe Station 本牟田部駅
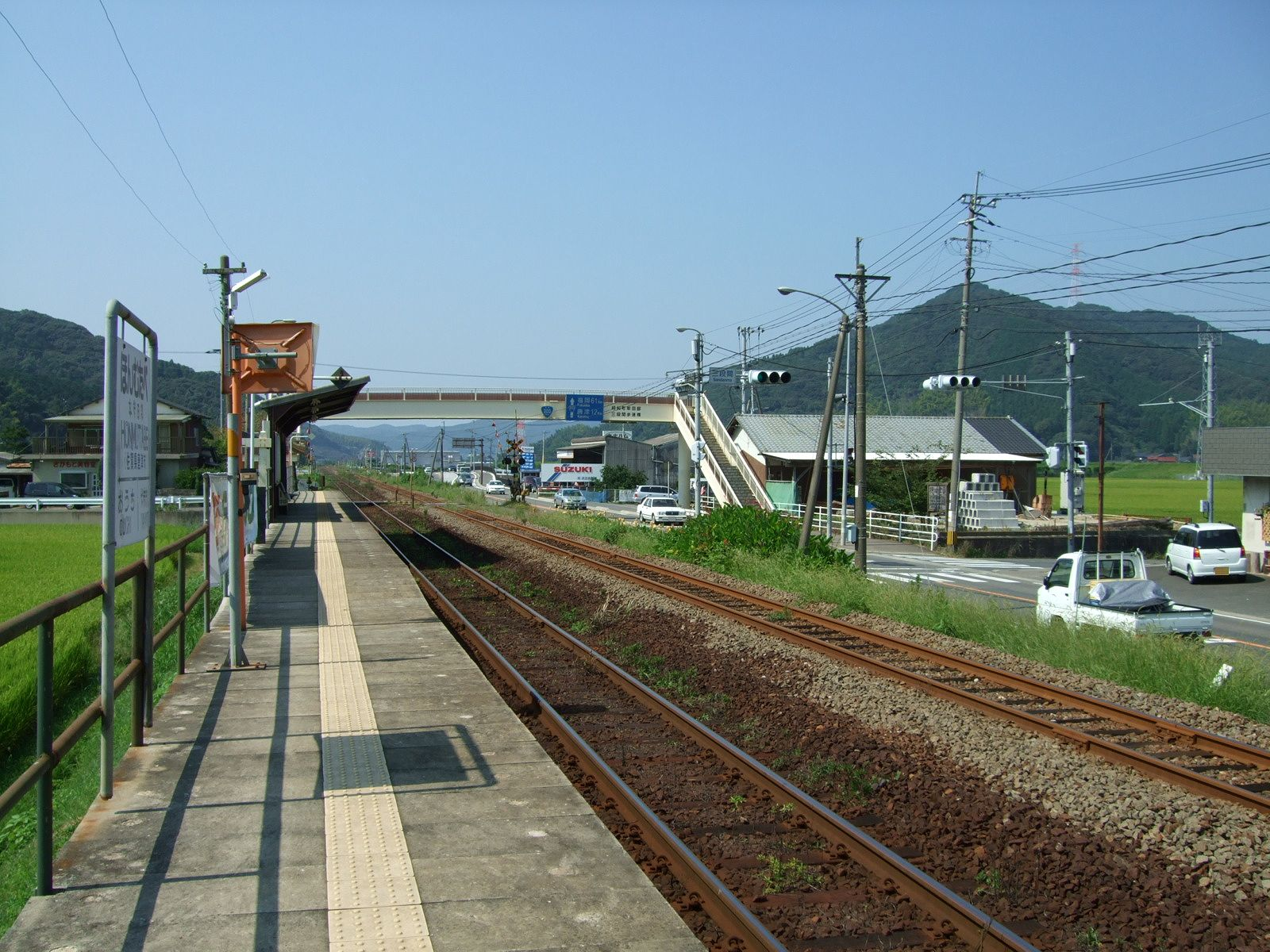
- Honmutabe Station in 2008

General information
- Location: Ochicho Mutabe, Karatsu-shi, Saga-ken 849-3231; Japan
- Coordinates: 33°22′20″N 129°59′48″E
- Operator: JR Kyushu
- Line: JK Karatsu Line
- Distance: 30.1 km from Kubota
- Platforms: 1 side platform
- Tracks: 1 + 1 passing line

Construction
- Structure type: At grade
- Cycle facilities: Bike shed

Other information
- Status: Unstaffed
- Website: Official website

History
- Opened: 1 February 1960

Passengers
- FY2015: 33 daily

Services
Preceding station	JR Kyushu	Following station
Ōchi towards Kubota	Karatsu Line	Yamamoto towards Nishi-Karatsu
Location
- Location within Saga Prefecture Location within Japan

Honmutabe Station (本牟田部駅, Honmutabe-eki) is a passenger railway station operated by JR Kyushu located in the city of Karatsu, Saga Prefecture, Japan.

== Lines ==
The station is served by the Karatsu Line and is located 30.1 km from the starting point of the line at Kubota.

== Station layout ==
The station, which is unstaffed, consists of a side platform serving a single track at grade. There is no station building, only a shelter on the platform for waiting passengers. The track serving the station and a passing line next to it run between the platform and the main road. The platform is accessed either by a level crossing or a footbridge. A bike shed is provided nearby.

== History ==
Honmutabe Station was opened on 1 March 1935, but was closed on 10 August 1941. It was reopened by the Japanese National Railways (JNR) opened the station on 1 February 1960 as an additional station on the existing track of the Karatsu Line. With the privatization of JNR on 1 April 1987, control of the station passed to JR Kyushu.

== Passenger statistics ==
In fiscal 2015, there were a total of 12,014 boarding passengers, giving a daily average of 33 passengers.

== Surrounding area ==
- Japan National Route 203
