= Ōchi Station =

Railway station in Karatsu, Saga Prefecture, Japan

Ōchi Station 相知駅
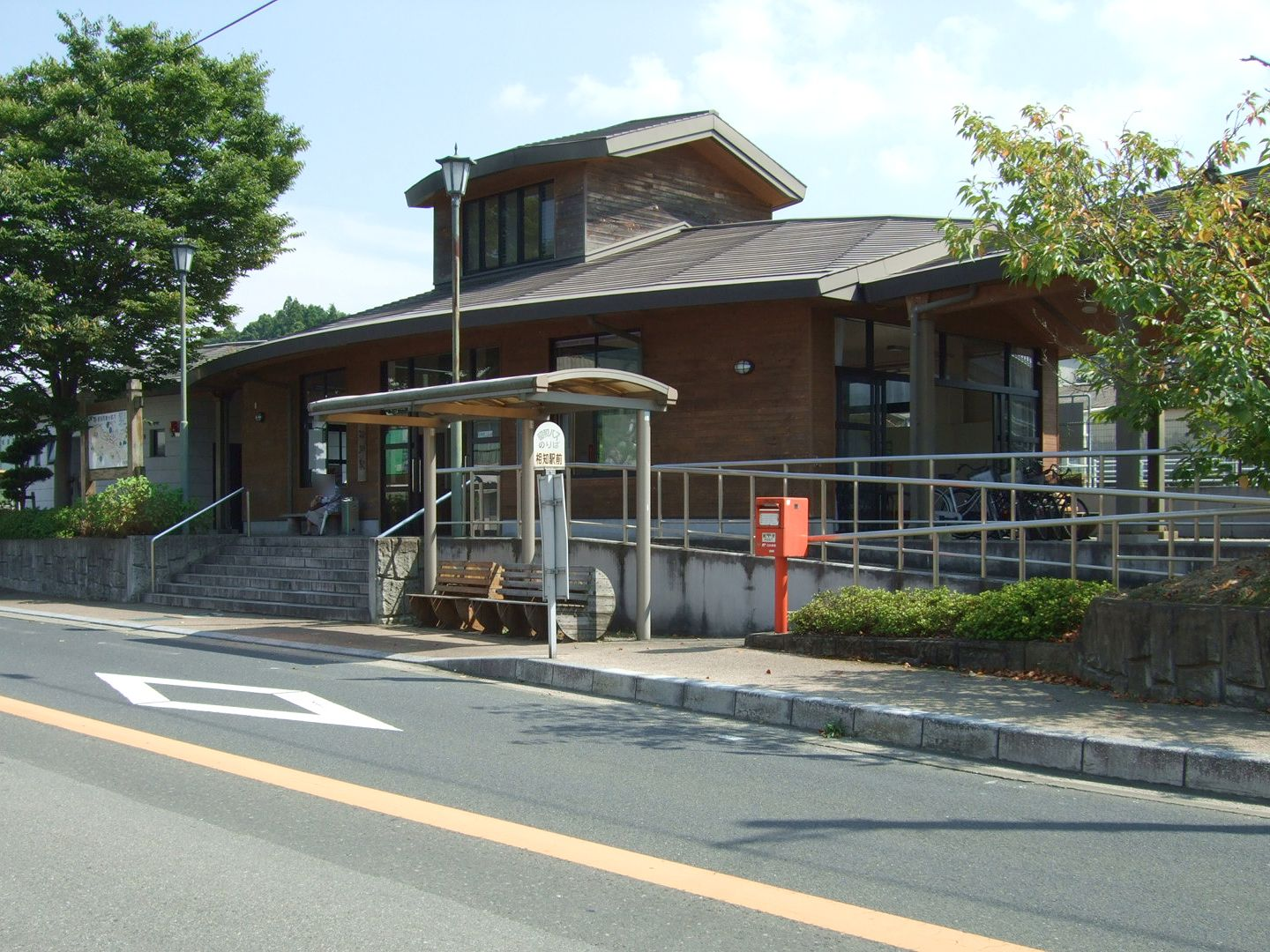
- Ōchi Station in 2008

General information
- Location: Ochicho Ochi, Karatsu-shi, Saga-ken 849-3201; Japan
- Coordinates: 33°20′49″N 130°01′12″E
- Operator: JR Kyushu
- Line: JK Karatsu Line
- Distance: 26.0 km from Kubota
- Platforms: 2 side platforms
- Tracks: 2
- Connections: Bus stop

Construction
- Structure type: At grade
- Accessible: No - platforms linked by footbridge

Other information
- Status: Tickets sold by kan'i itaku agent
- Website: Official website

History
- Opened: 13 June 1899

Passengers
- FY2015: 230

Services
Preceding station	JR Kyushu	Following station
Iwaya towards Kubota	Karatsu Line	Honmutabe towards Nishi-Karatsu
Location
- Location within Saga Prefecture Location within Japan

Ōchi Station (相知駅, Ōchi-eki) is a passenger railway station operated by JR Kyushu located in the city of Karatsu, Saga Prefecture, Japan.

== Lines ==
The station is served by the Karatsu Line and is located 26.0 km from the starting point of the line at Kubota.

== Station layout ==
The station consists of two unnumbered side platforms serving two tracks. It had originally been a side and an island platform but the centre track has been removed. A station building also doubles as a community hall. Access to the opposite side platform is by means of a footbridge. The station is unstaffed but a kan'i itaku agent sells some types of tickets from the ticket window in the station building.

=== Platforms ===
North (Station)side	■ JK Karatsu Line	for Saga
South side	■ JK Karatsu Line	for Karatsu and Nishi-Karatsu

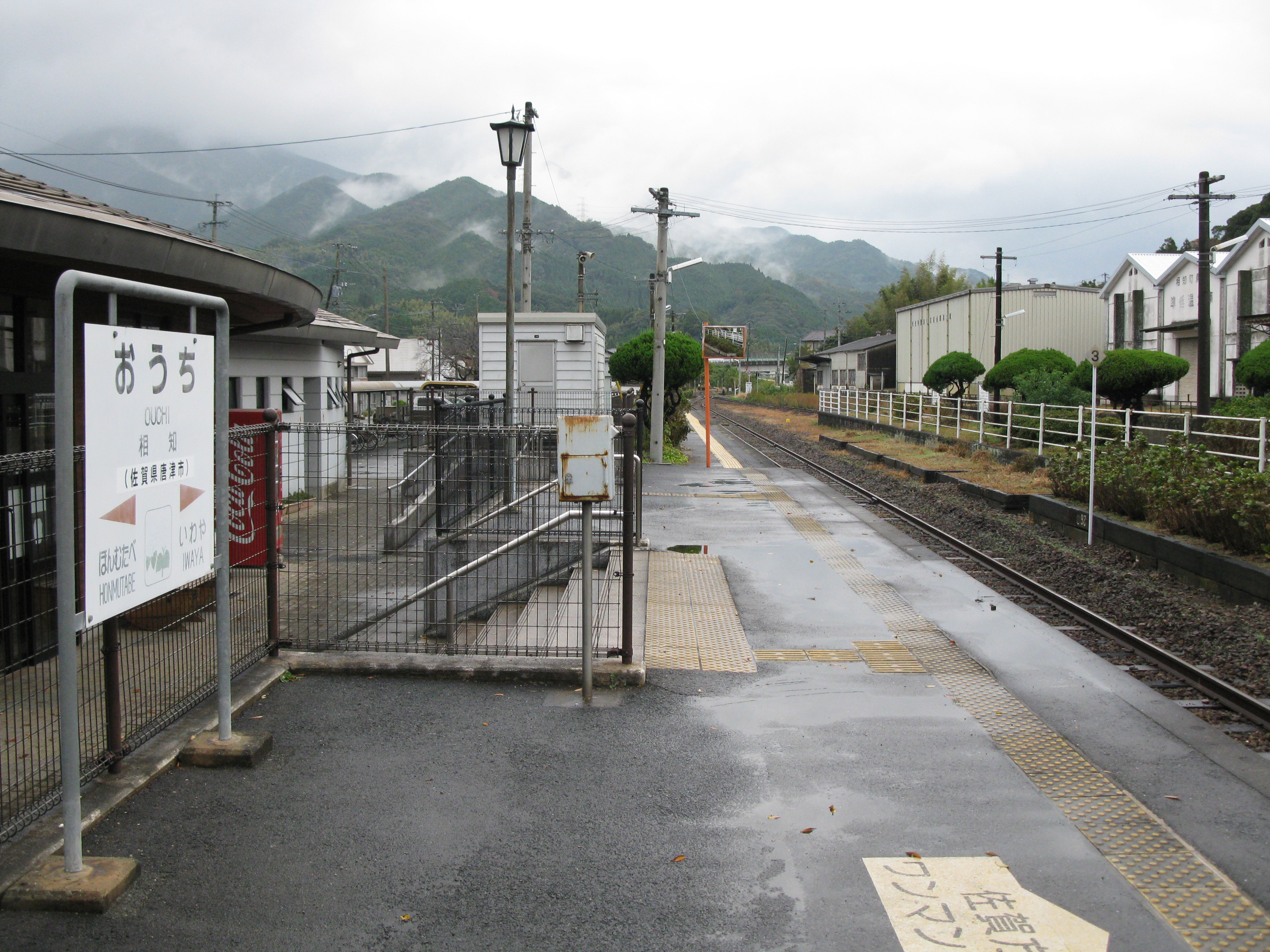
Access to platform from the station building. On the right can be seen the track bed for the former centre track. Far right is the other platform.

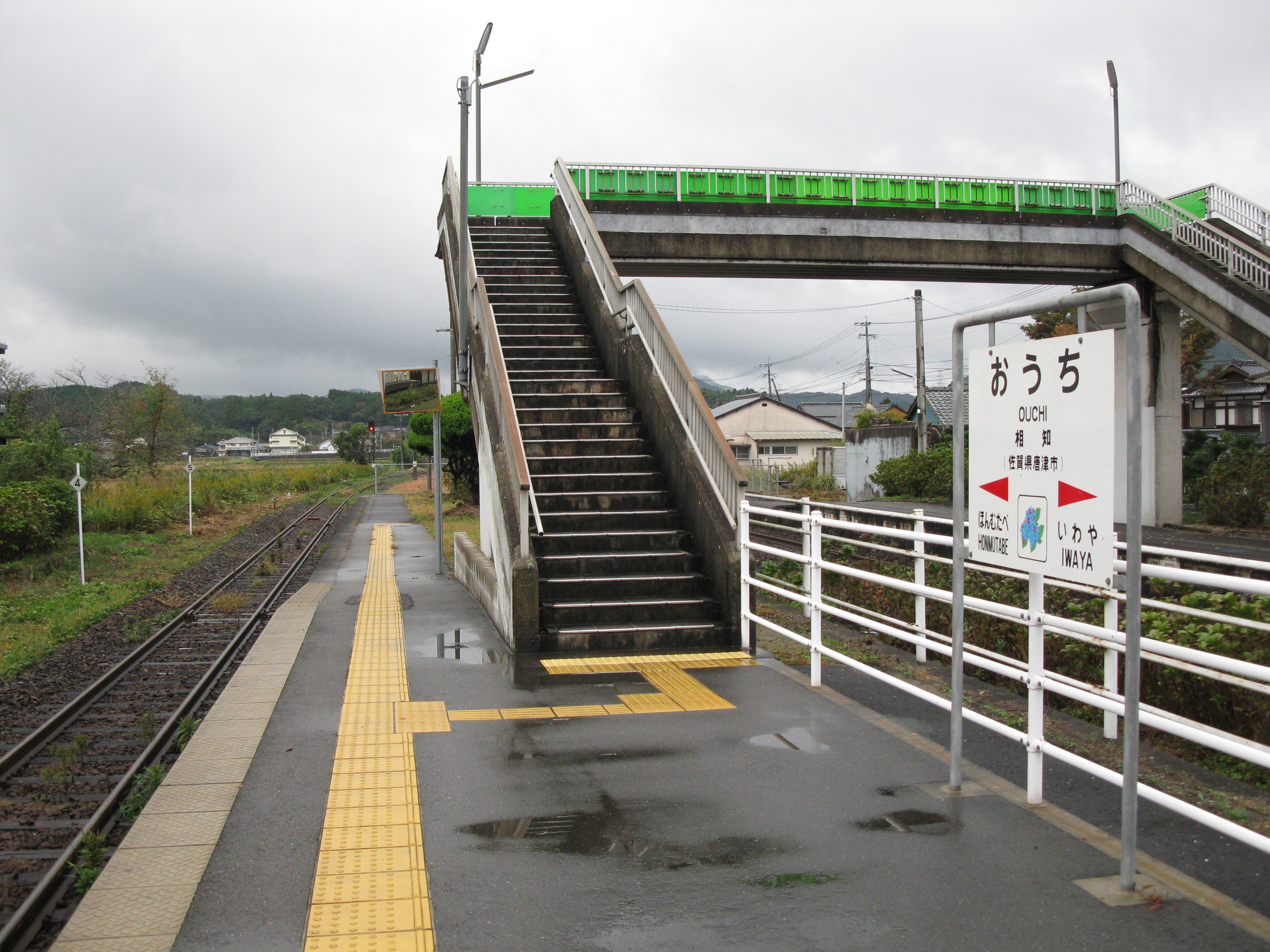
View of the other side platform, accessed from the station building by a footbridge.

== History ==
On 1 December 1898, the Karatsu Kogyo Railway had opened a track from Miyoken (now Nishi-Karatsu) to Yamamoto. On 13 June 1899, the track was extended to Kyūragi with Ōchi opening on the same day as an intermediate station on the track. On 23 February 1902, the company, now renamed the Karatsu Railway, merged with the Kyushu Railway. When the Kyushu Railway was nationalized on 1 July 1907, Japanese Government Railways (JGR) took over control of the station. On 12 October 1909, the line which served the station was designated the Karatsu Line. With the privatization of Japanese National Railways (JNR), the successor of JGR, on 1 April 1987, control of the station passed to JR Kyushu.

== Passenger statistics ==
In fiscal 2015, there were a total of 84,066 boarding passengers, giving a daily average of 230 passengers.

== Surrounding area ==
- Ōchi Post office
- Karatsu City Hall Ōchi Branch
- Ōchi Library
- Karatsu City Ōchi Elementary School
- Karatsu City Ōchi Junior High School
- Memorial Hall of Hideo Murata

== See also ==
- List of railway stations in Japan
