= Iwaya Station (Saga) =

Railway station in Karatsu, Saga Prefecture, Japan

Iwaya Station 岩屋駅
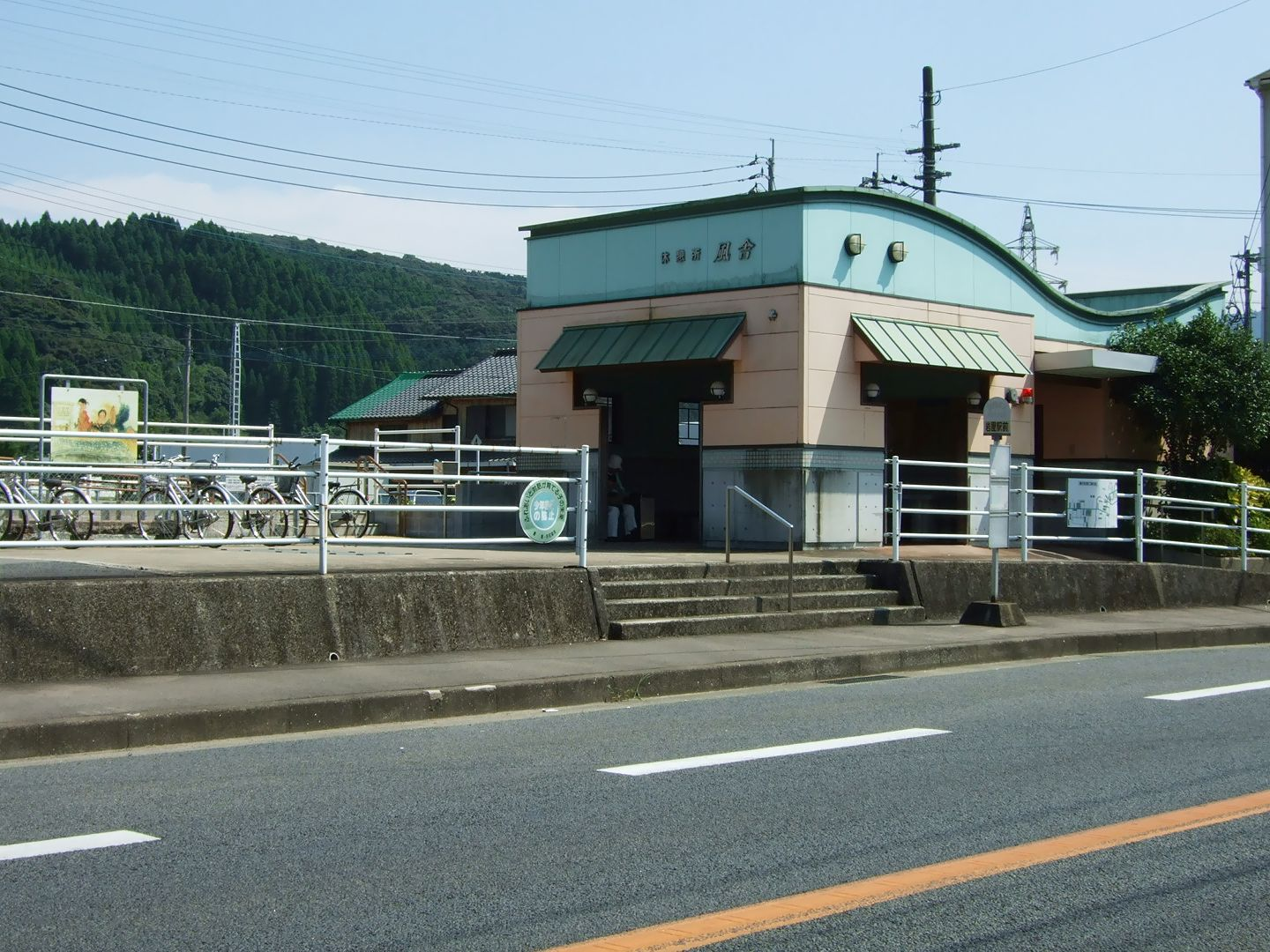
- Iwaya Station in 2008

General information
- Location: Kyuragimachi Motoyama, Karatsu-shi, Saga-ken 849-3133; Japan
- Coordinates: 33°19′51″N 130°02′18″E
- Operator: JR Kyushu
- Line: JK Karatsu Line
- Distance: 23.3 km from Kubota
- Platforms: 1 side platform
- Tracks: 1

Construction
- Structure type: At grade
- Cycle facilities: Designated parking area for bicycles

Other information
- Status: Unstaffed
- Website: Official website

History
- Opened: 13 June 1899
- Former names: Motoyama (until 1 November 1903)

Passengers
- 2016: 195 daily

Services
Preceding station	JR Kyushu	Following station
Kyūragi towards Kubota	Karatsu Line	Ōchi towards Nishi-Karatsu
Location
- Location within Saga Prefecture Location within Japan

Iwaya Station (岩屋駅, Iwaya-eki) is a passenger railway station operated by JR Kyushu located in the city of Karatsu, Saga Prefecture, Japan.

== Lines ==
The station is served by the Karatsu Line and is located 23.3 km from the starting point of the line at Kubota.

== Station layout ==
The station consists of a side platform serving a single track. A small concrete waiting room/shelter has been set up behind the platform and there is a designated parking area for bicycles nearby. The station is unstaffed and there is no ticket window but kan'i itaku agents sell some types of tickets from nearby shops.

== History ==
On 1 December 1898, the Karatsu Kogyo Railway had opened a track from Miyoken (now Nishi-Karatsu) to Yamamoto. On 13 June 1899, the track was extended to Kyūragi with this station, at that time named Motoyama, opening on the same day as an intermediate station on the track. On 23 February 1902, the company, now renamed the Karatsu Railway, merged with the Kyushu Railway. On 1 November 1903, the station was renamed Iwaya. When the Kyushu Railway was nationalized on 1 July 1907, Japanese Government Railways (JGR) took over control of the station. On 12 October 1909, the line which served the station was designated the Karatsu Line. With the privatization of Japanese National Railways (JNR), the successor of JGR, on 1 April 1987, control of the station passed to JR Kyushu.

== Passenger statistics ==
In fiscal 2016, the daily average number of passengers using the station (boarding passengers only) was above 100 and below 323. The station did not rank among the top 300 busiest stations of JR Kyushu.

== Surrounding area ==
- Japan National Route 203
- Karatsu City Motoyama Elementary School

== See also ==
- List of railway stations in Japan
