= Nagoya Castle (Hizen Province) =

Ruined castle in Karatsu, Saga prefecture, Japan

- 名護屋城
- Karatsu, Saga, Japan
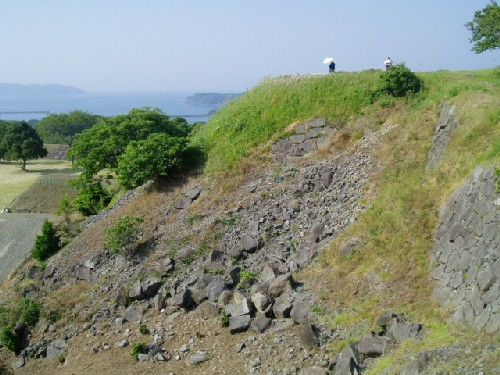
- Ruins of the inner citadel Nagoya Castle

Site information
- Type: Japanese castle
- Open to the public: yes
- Condition: Ruins

Location
- Nagoya Castle
- Location within Saga Prefecture Location within Japan
- Coordinates: 33°31′48.12″N 129°52′9.75″E

Site history
- Built: 1591
- Built by: Toyotomi Hideyoshi
- In use: Sengoku period
- Demolished: 1598

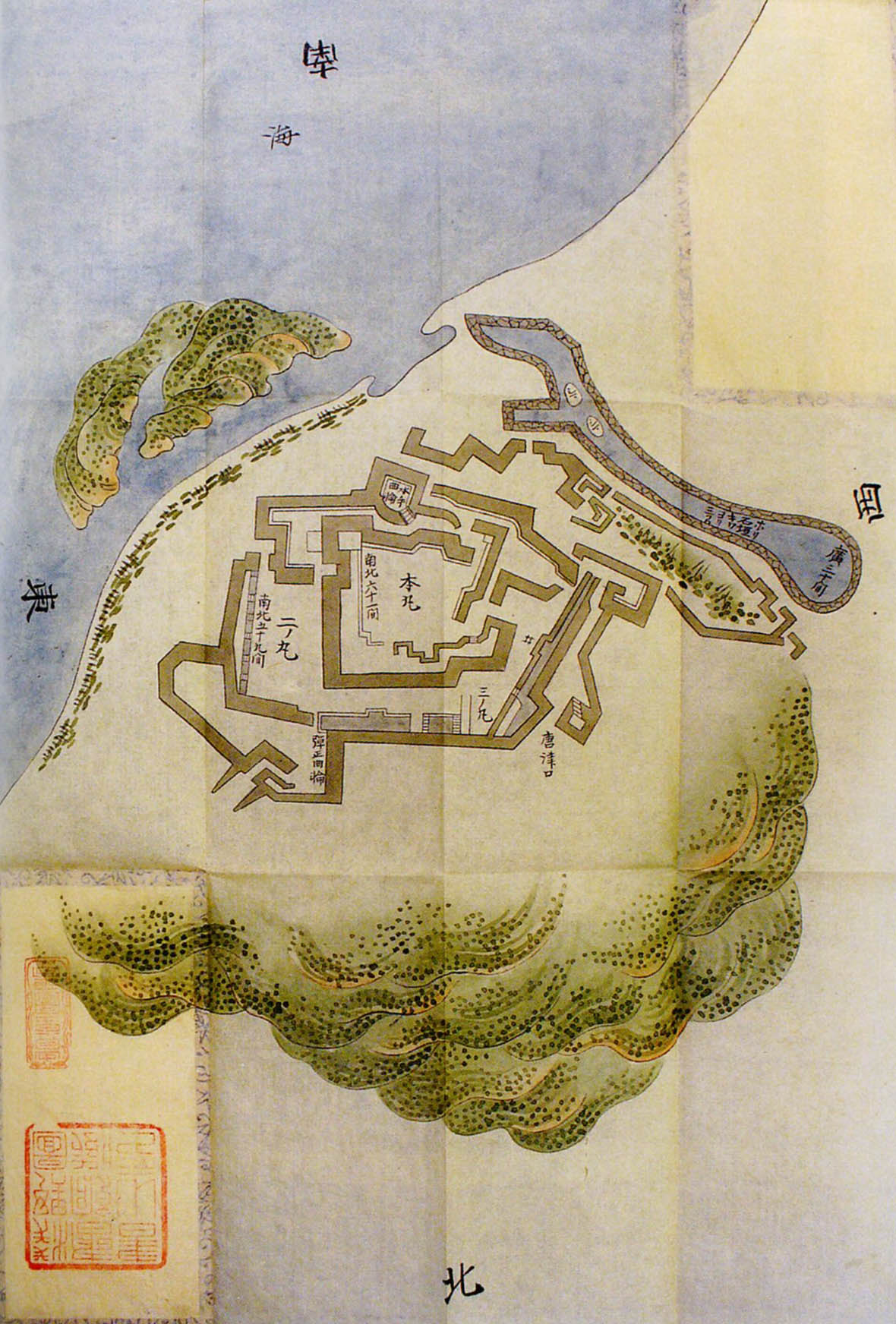
Old map of Nagoya Castle in Hizen Province. South is on top.

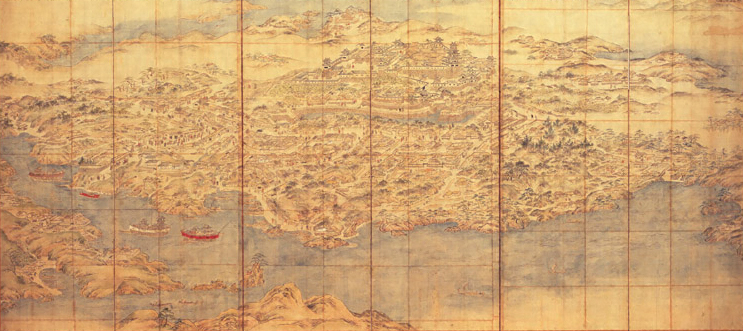
Byobu painting of Nagoya castle.

Nagoya Castle (名護屋城, Nagoya-jō) was a Japanese castle located in the Chinzei neighborhood of the city of Karatsu, Saga Prefecture. It is sometimes called Hizen-Nagoya Castle to distinguish it from the more famous Nagoya Castle in Aichi Prefecture. It is located on a hill in the center of Higashi Matsuura peninsula, about 10 kilometers north of the Karatsu city center.

It is known for serving as the base from which Toyotomi Hideyoshi launched his invasions of Korea from 1592 to 1598. Although none of the original historic structures of Nagoya Castle remain, the castle's ruined foundations survived, and were designated a National Historic Site in 1926. They were elevated to a Special Historic Site in 1955 and later in 2000 the area under protection was expanded. In 2006 it was selected as the 87th of the 100 Fine Castles of Japan.

A museum dedicated to the history of Japanese-Korean relations and related subjects is associated with Nagoya Castle and located nearby.

== History ==
The northern coast area of Hizen Province (modern-day Saga and Nagasaki Prefecture was held by Matsura clan, who engaged in trade and piracy around East China Sea and Tsushima Strait from the end of the Heian period. The clan was active in the defense of Japan during the Mongol invasions of Japan of 1274 and 1281. However, by the Muromachi period, the clan had become subordinate to their more powerful neighbors, such as the Hata clan. After Toyotomi Hideyoshi's Kyūshū campaign of 1586-1587, his general Terazawa Hirotaka was awarded the area. After Hideyoshi consolidated his control over Japan with the defeat of the Odawara Hōjō in 1590, he turned his attention to invasion of the Korean Peninsula as a stepping stone to conquest of Ming China. Needing a field headquarters in northern Kyushu as a command center, Hideyoshi found the place name "Nagoya", the same as his hometown of Nagoya (albeit with different kanji), to be a pleasing coincidence, and was also pleased by the auspicious name of the mountain on which the castle stood, Mount Katsuō, and decided to build a castle there. The planning of the castle was made by Kuroda Yoshitaka, and actual construction were performed by local lords of Kyushu under the command of Kato Kiyomasa and Fukushima Masanori. The construction was started from the autumn of 1591, and competed in the spring of 1592. Feudal lords from all over the country were ordered to amass at the site and to contribute to a portion of its construction. Its scale was second only to Osaka Castle among castles of the time.

Hizen Nagoya castle spread along a 50 meter hillside, which spread to southeast and southwest from the center point. The central enclosure was a square shaped area of 100 meter length at the highest point of the hill. At the north edge of the central area, where is the crossing point of two ridges, there was a seven-story tenshu. The tenshu was surrounded by concentric enclosures with masugata-style compound gates, and the complex included a palace for Hideyoshi and his concubine Yodo-dono. The Total size of Hizen Nagoya Castle was over 1000 meters long and 500 meters wide, and whole part of the castle were protected by stone walls. However, as the castle was not actually designed for use in combat, so its stone walls were relatively low and the number of yagura turrets was few in relation to the castle's size. In June 1592, Dominican friar Juan Cobo arrived in Japan and met with Hideyoshi at Nagoya Castle, which was still under construction. It is said that during the brief time that Hideyoshi stayed at Nagoya Castle, he memorized the shite (lead role) parts for ten Noh plays and performed them, forcing various daimyō to accompany him onstage as the waki (accompanying role), and even performed before the Emperor.

Hideyoshi gathered all of his lords to this area, irrespective to actual participation to military action, many of whom constructed permanent bases guarded by stone walls surrounding the main castle complex. Within a three-kilometer radius were the camps of about 118 vassals. A town grew up around the military establishments, with a population of over 100,000 people at its height. According to the Matsuura Kojiki, over 205,570 soldiers, mostly from western Japan, crossed over to Korea in the first months of the Imjin War in 1592, and a further 102,415 soldiers, mostly from eastern Japan, were stationed around Hizen-Nagoya. Water sources were insufficient to support such a large force, and fighting caused by water shortages was constant.

Hideyoshi commanded operations from this castle, but on his death in 1598, Tokugawa Ieyasu ordered the withdrawal of all Japanese forces from Korea. With the establishment of the Tokugawa Shogunate, the castle was ordered to be demolished. It was too large to demolish, but foundations of tenshu was thoroughly destroyed as a symbol of the castle. Many stones and some structures were relocated for the construction of Karatsu Castle, ten kilometers to the south. Date Masamune is said to have dismantled the castle main gate (Otemon) and moved it to his stronghold of Aoba Castle in Sendai. Further, after the Shimabara Rebellion in 1637, the shogunate ordered more of the castle's remaining walls to be destroyed, to prevent the possibility of any use in any future rebellion.

In 1956 there was a proposal made to build a reconstruction of Nagoya Castle; however, the plan was rejected by the national government in 1962, citing a lack of solid historical evidence of the castle's appearance, as well as negative political issues regarding the site as having been a base from which Japan invaded Korea.

Subsequently, excavation works began in 1976, with the excavation data eventually rendered into computer graphics (CG). In 2015 the CG reconstructions were made available for viewing for the public through a downloadable application.

== See also ==
- List of Special Places of Scenic Beauty, Special Historic Sites and Special Natural Monuments

== Literature ==
- De Lange, William (2021). An Encyclopedia of Japanese Castles. Groningen: Toyo Press. pp. 600 pages. ISBN 978-9492722300.
- Schmorleitz, Morton S. (1974). Castles in Japan. Tokyo: Charles E. Tuttle Co. pp. 144–145. ISBN 0-8048-1102-4.
- Motoo, Hinago (1986). Japanese Castles. Tokyo: Kodansha. p. 200 pages. ISBN 0-87011-766-1.
- Mitchelhill, Jennifer (2004). Castles of the Samurai: Power and Beauty. Tokyo: Kodansha. p. 112 pages. ISBN 4-7700-2954-3.
- Turnbull, Stephen (2003). Japanese Castles 1540-1640. Osprey Publishing. p. 64 pages. ISBN 1-84176-429-9.
