= Tenzan Prefectural Natural Park =

Prefectural National Park in Saga, Japan

- 天山県立自然公園
- Interactive map of Tenzan Prefectural Natural Park
- Location: Saga Prefecture, Japan
- Area: 49.30 km^{2} (19.03 sq mi)
- Established: 1 October 1970

Tenzan Prefectural Natural Park (天山県立自然公園, Tenzan kenritsu shizen kōen) is a Prefectural Natural Park in central Saga Prefecture, Japan. Established in 1970, the park spans the municipalities of Karatsu, Ogi, Saga, and Taku.

== See also ==
- National Parks of Japan
