= Japan National Route 34 =

National highway in Japan

National Route 34
- 国道34号
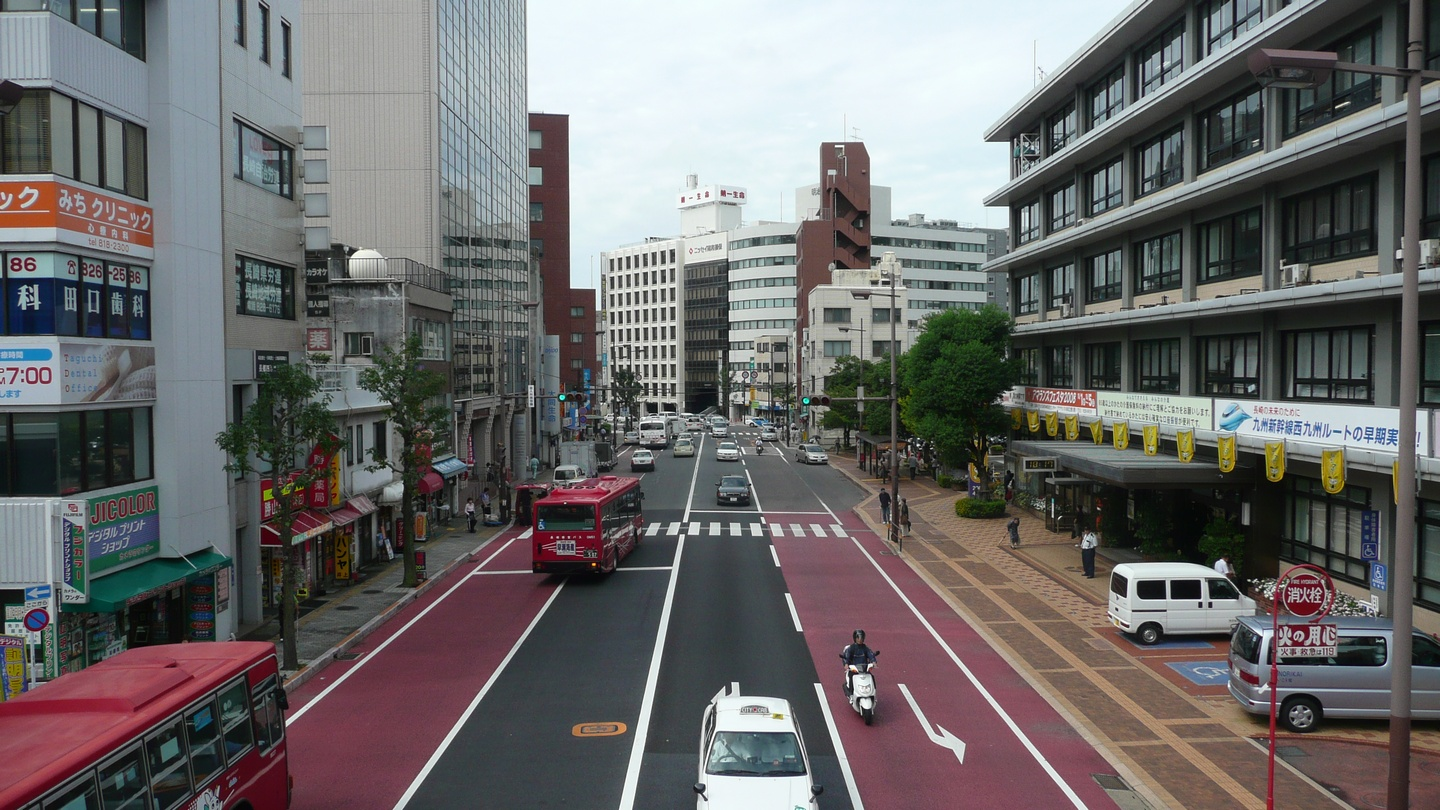

Route information
- Length: 136.5 km (84.8 mi)
- Existed: 4 December 1952–present

Major junctions
- North end: National Route 3 in Tosu
- South end: National Route 204 / National Route 324 in Nagasaki

Location
- Country: Japan

Highway system
- National highways of Japan; Expressways of Japan
← National Route 33	→ National Route 35

National Route 34 (国道34号, Kokudō Sanjūyon-gō) is a highway in Japan on the island of Kyūshū which runs from Saga City in Saga Prefecture to Nagasaki in Nagasaki Prefecture. It follows the old Nagasaki Kaidō, a road from the Edo period. About 10% of the route is 4 lanes or more, and the rest is two lanes.

== Route data ==
- Length: 136.5 km (84.8 mi)
- Origin: Tosu (junction with Route 3)
- Terminus: Nagasaki (terminates at Route 57 and Route 202)
- Major cities: Saga, Takeo, Ōmura, Isahaya

== Overlapping sections ==
- From Saga City (Kokuritsubyōinmae intersection) to Ogi (Gojō intersection): Route 203
- From Ogi (Maemitsue intersection) to Kōhoku (Higashibun intersection): Route 207
- From Isahaya (Obunakoshi Tunnel intersection) to Isahaya Tarami-chō Keya: Route 207
- From Isahaya (Obunakoshi Tunnel intersection) to Nagasaki (Kenchōmae intersection): Route 57
- From Nagasaki (Yagamimachi intersection) to Nagasaki (Kenchōmae intersection): Route 251
- From Nagasaki Ōhashi-chō (Iwayabashi intersection) to Nagasaki (Kenchōmae intersection): Route 206
- From Nagasaki (Takara-chō intersection) to Nagasaki (Kenchōmae intersection): Route 202

== Municipalities passed through ==
- Saga Prefecture
  - Tosu - Miyaki - Kamimine - Yoshinogari - Kanzaki - Saga - Ogi - Kōhoku - Ōmachi - Takeo - Ureshino
- Nagasaki Prefecture
  - Higashisonogi - Ōmura - Isahaya - Nagasaki
