= Hachimandake Prefectural Natural Park =

Natural park of Saga prefecture, Japan

- 八幡岳県立自然公園
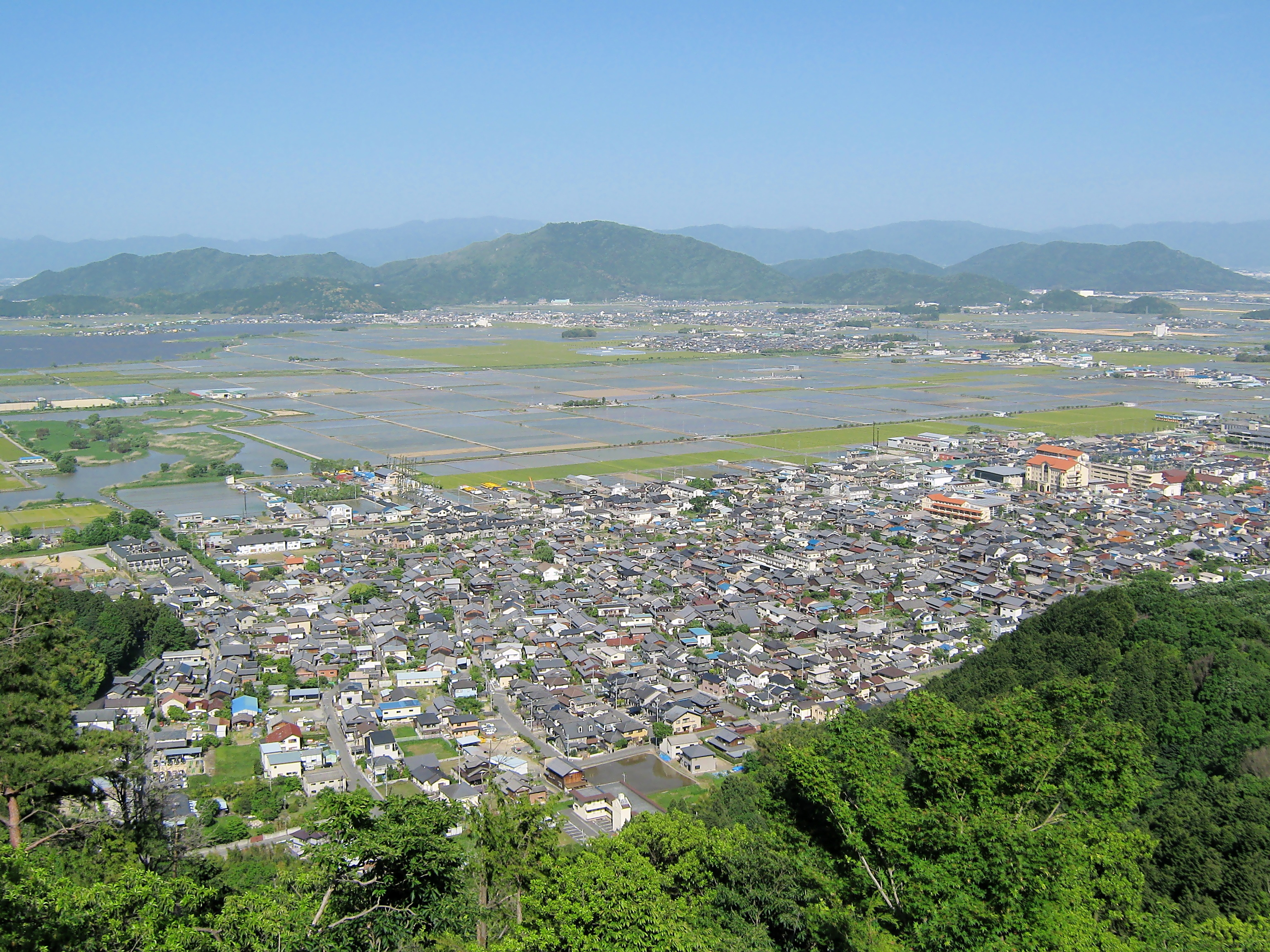
- Mount Hachiman (764 m)

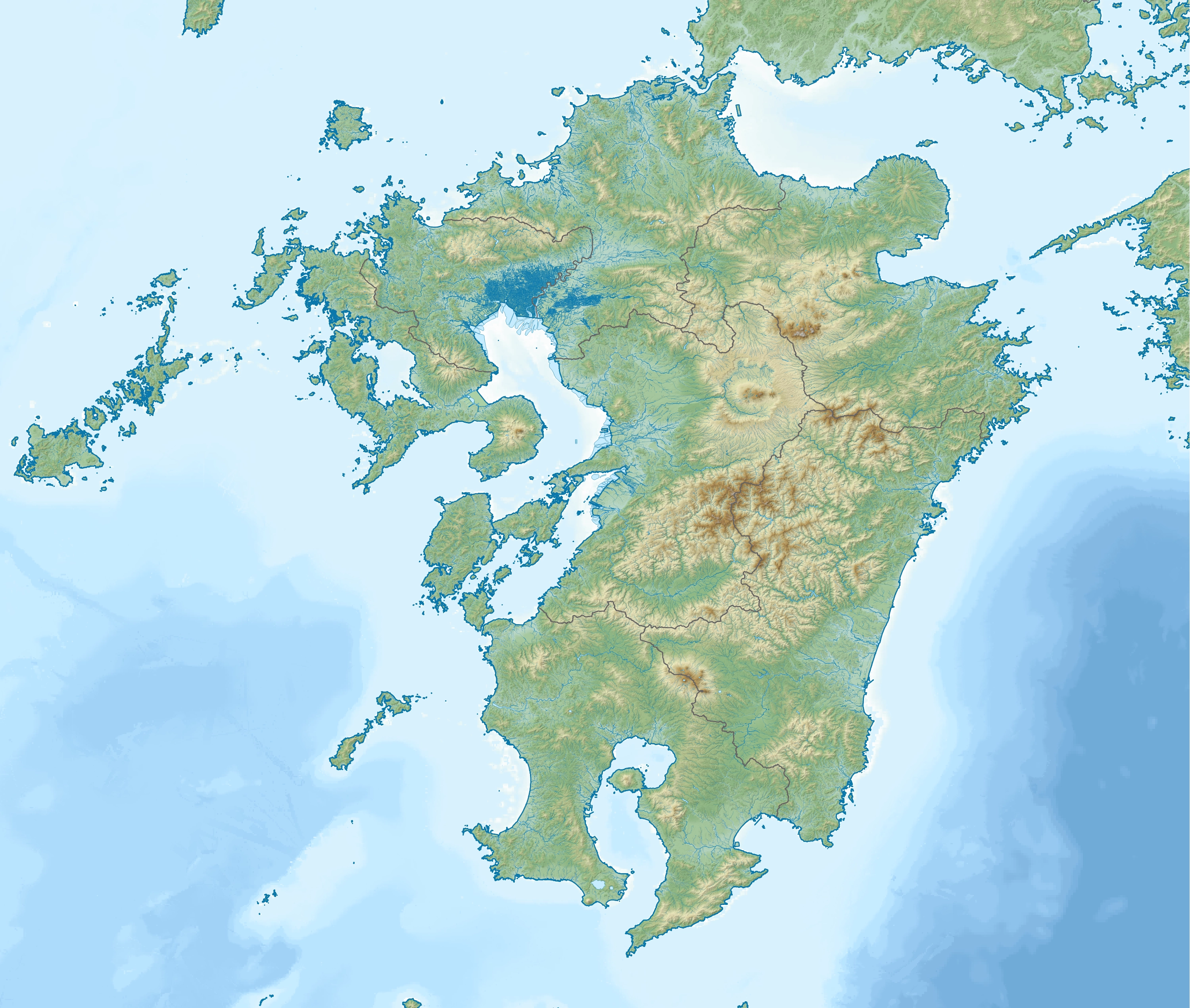
- Location within Saga Prefecture Location within Kyushu Location within Japan
- Location: Saga Prefecture, Japan
- Coordinates: 33.2867°N 130.04°E
- Area: 8.60 km^{2} (3.32 sq mi)
- Established: 1 October 1970

Hachimandake Prefectural Natural Park (八幡岳県立自然公園, Hachimandake kenritsu shizen kōen) is a Prefectural Natural Park in central Saga Prefecture, Japan. Established in 1970, the park spans the municipalities of Imari, Karatsu, Takeo, and Taku.

== See also ==
- National Parks of Japan
