= Suwa Shrine (Nagasaki) =

Shinto shrine in Nagasaki, Japan

Suwa Shrine (諏訪神社)
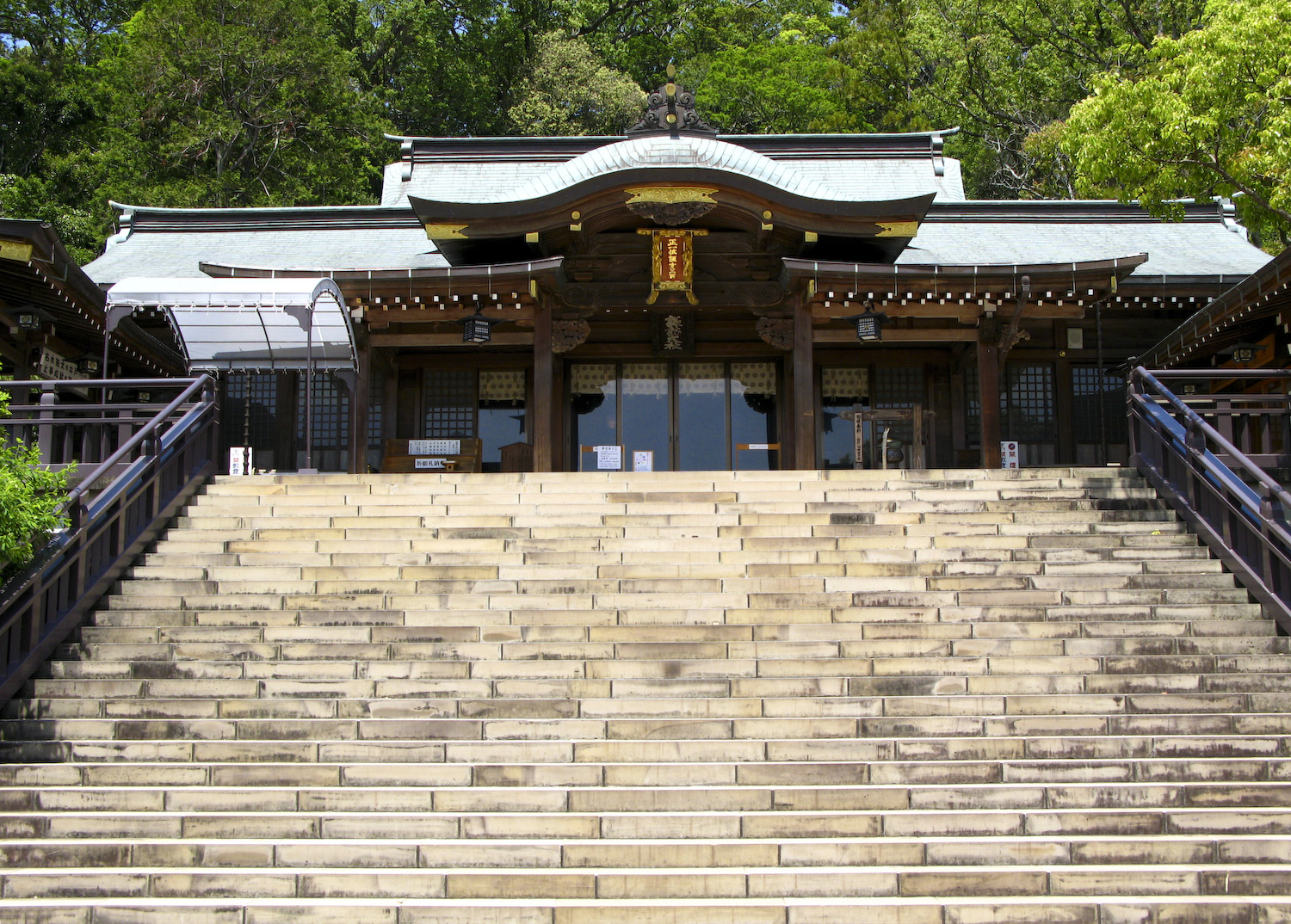
- The shrine complex stands at the top of a long staircase.

- Location within Japan

Religion
- Affiliation: Shinto

Location
- Coordinates: 32°45′16″N 129°52′54″E

Website
- www.osuwasan.jp

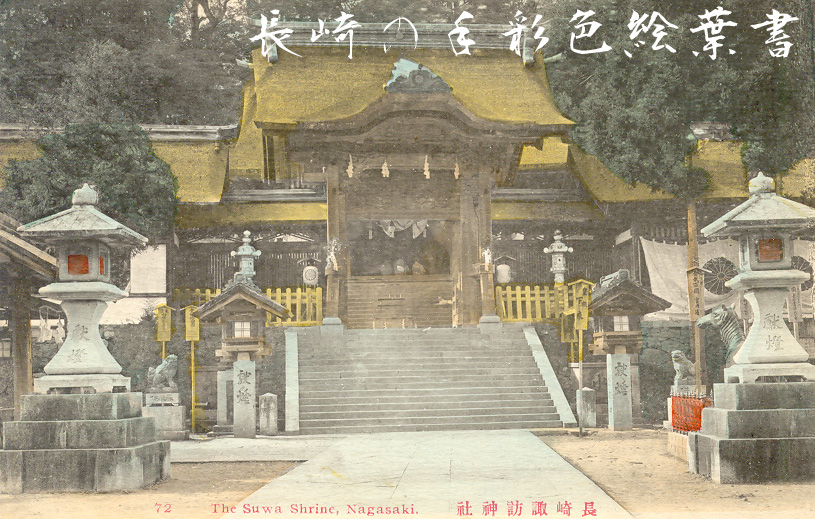
The Suwa Shrine, Meiji period

Suwa Shrine (諏訪神社, suwa jinja) is the major Shinto shrine of Nagasaki, Japan, and one of the major locations of the Nagasaki Kunchi, originally celebrated on the ninth day of the ninth lunar month and now celebrated on the fixed dates of October 7 to October 9. It is located in the northern part of the city, on the slopes of Mount Tamazono, and features a 277-step stone staircase leading up the mountain to the various buildings that comprise the shrine.

Suwa Shrine was established as a way of stopping and reverting the conversion to Christianity that was taking place in Nagasaki. In modern times, it remains an important and successful center of the community.

The shrine in Nagasaki is one of many Suwa shrines, all of which are dedicated to Suwa-no-Kami, a kami of valor and duty, and are linked with Suwa Taisha, the head shrine of Suwa-no-Kami worship. Two other kami are also enshrined at Suwa Shrine, all three of which are celebrated during Kunchi.

== History ==
The official date of construction for Suwa Shrine is 1614, the same year as Tokugawa Ieyasu's Edict against Christianity, although there was little more than a small structure to mark the position of the future shrine at this time. At that time, Nagasaki was home to the largest Christian population in Japan, and had destroyed many of the former Shinto shrines and Buddhist temples. The Tokugawa Shogunate had taken power and reversed its friendly policy towards Christianity. The government had begun forcing Christians to reconvert to the Japanese religions of Buddhism and Shinto. It was thought that establishing a major point of Shinto worship would be important to these efforts, giving the local population a central point of worship and a sense of community.

In 1623, Aoki Kensei (1582-1656), a Shugendō priest, came to Nagasaki. With the backing of the bakufu and the Nagasaki's magistrate, land on His religious zeal and skill at organizing, combined with authority granted by the leading Yoshida Shinto council, led to the completion of the main structure of Suwa Shrine in 1626. In order to attract attention and encourage attendance at the new shrine, a dramatic yutate-sai ritual, where a priest demonstrates his communion with the kami by plunging his hands into boiling water unharmed, was performed. In spite of this, as well as the sumo match that followed, very few people came to watch.

In 1634, an edict was issued requiring all people to register at the shrine and be counted. In addition to this, in another attempt to further increase local participation in shrine events, a great autumn festival was held at the shrine. Both of these events were created in the attempt to discover any remaining Christians, who would not be able to participate in the festival or register at the shrine. Anyone who failed to do so was arrested, tortured and possibly executed if they did not renounce their Christian faith.

Suwa Shrine was relocated further up the slope of the mountain twice, first in 1647 and then again in 1683.

Because Nagasaki was the only place in Japan with an open port, it was considered essential to impress the Dutch and Chinese traders with Japanese culture. In addition to the festival, beginning in 1638 major performances of Noh were also held at Suwa Shrine, at the direct command of the Shōgun. These performances continued until 1856, when a major fire at the shrine destroyed most of the expensive Noh masks and props.

From 1871 through 1946, Suwa was officially designated one of the kokuhei-chūsha (国幣中社), meaning that it stood in the mid-range of ranked, nationally significant shrines.

Suwa Shrine survived the atomic bombing of Nagasaki on August 9, 1945. It is thought to have survived intact due to its strategic location in the central part of Mount Tamazono's southern flank, although in the aftermath of the bomb local residents were quick to note that while the famous Urakami Cathedral and surrounding Catholic neighborhoods were obliterated, the Shinto shrine still stood.

This was considered to be significant by the survivors of the bombing, showing the power of the native Japanese kami as opposed to the imported Christian god. In addition, priests from Suwa Shrine took an active role in the rebuilding of Nagasaki, including consecrating the land and purifying structures that still stood.

In 1984, a large-scale reconstruction repaired and modernized the shrine, installing such conveniences as air conditioners and glass windows. This reconstruction was controversial, as some felt that modern conveniences had no place at a traditional shrine.

== Festivals ==
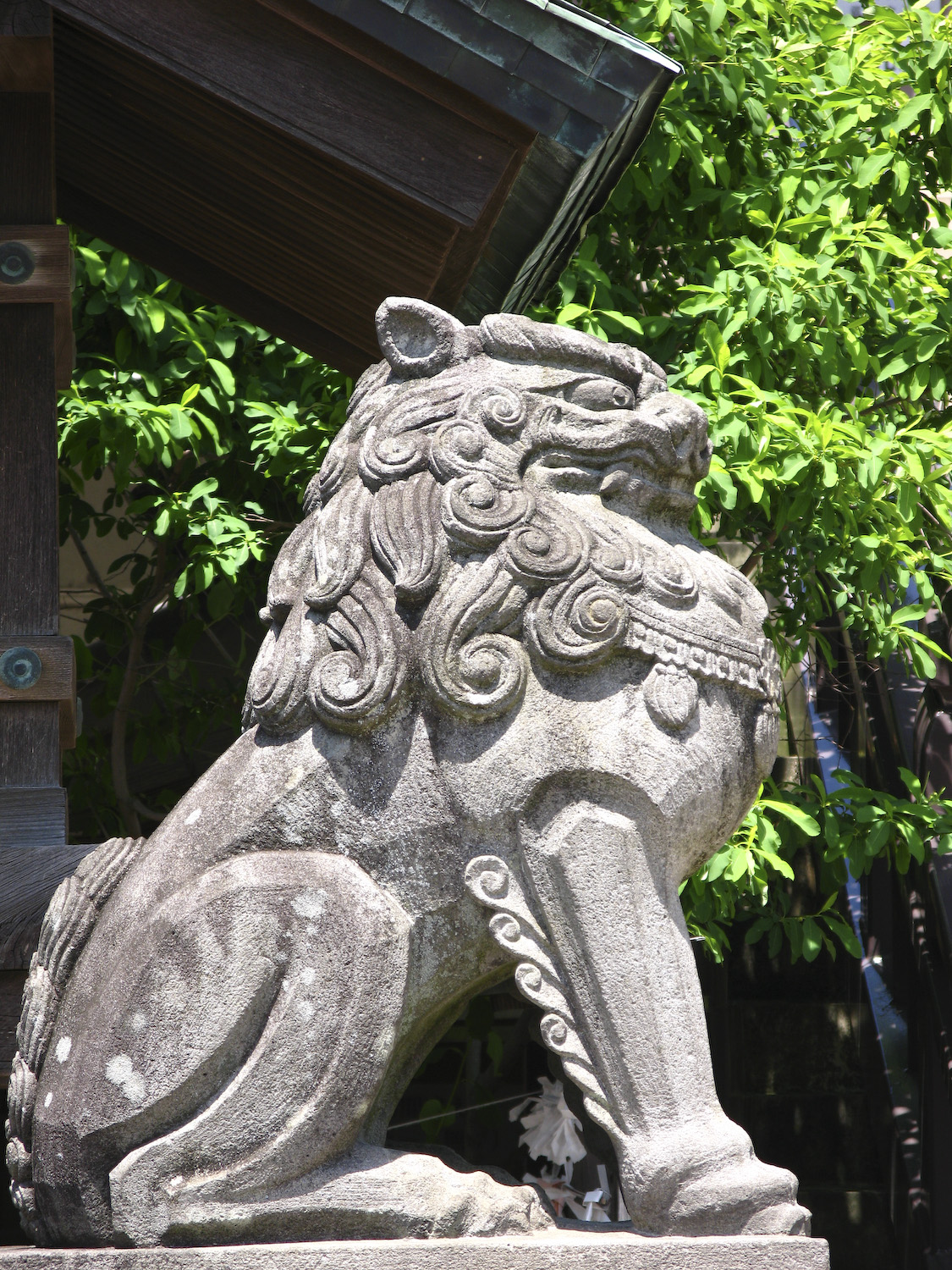
Koma-inu at the shrine

Like most Shinto shrines, every year thousands of people visit Suwa Shrine to pray for peace and prosperity. The Shrine is also the main destination in Nagasaki for events such as Shichi-Go-San and the coming-of-age day ceremonies.

Suwa Shrine is also the host to many annual festivals. These festivals serve the joint purpose of honoring the kami, providing a sense of community for shrine worshipers, and providing exposure and income for the shrine itself. Some of these festivals are typical to all major Shinto shrines in Japan, but some are unique to Suwa Shrine.

- Atomic bomb commemorative service - This festival is probably unique in all of Japan, in that it combines elements of Christian, Buddhist and Shinto worship to pray for the 35,000-40,000 people killed by the atomic bomb dropped on Nagasaki. It takes place every year on August 9.
- Doll's Festival - Like all of Japan, Suwa Shrine observes the Doll's Festival on March 3. However, since the 1980s the festival has been observed in an unusual way, in that attractive, 20-year-old women are selected to wear the shrine's collection of antique kimono and pose in a live Doll's Day procession. The competition among the young women is fierce, and there are far more applicants than positions in the festival. The two most beautiful women are chosen for the key roles of the Emperor and Empress in the procession. This tradition was created largely as a media event to promote and advertise Suwa Shrine, and every year television crews are invited to broadcast the festival.

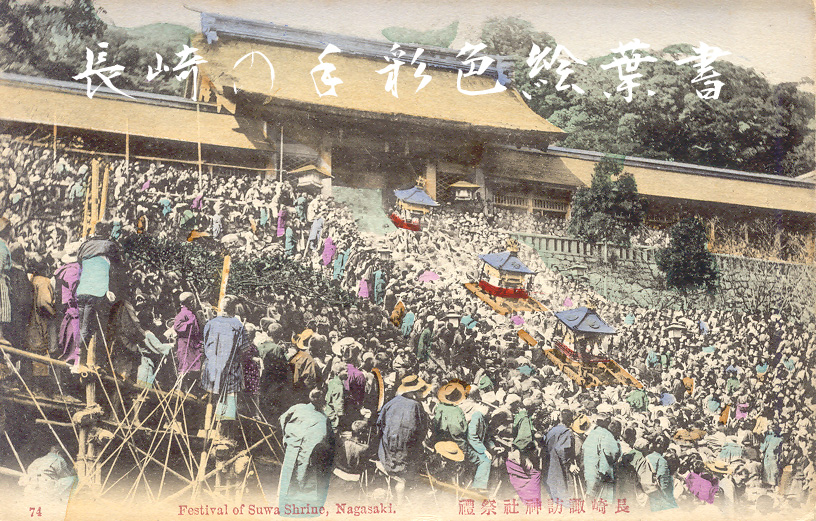
Festival of Suwa Shrine, Nagasaki, Meiji Period

- Kunchi - The most famous of Suwa Shrine's festivals, this festival began along with the founding of the shrine as a way to both demonstrate its new importance in the community and as a way to hunt for Hidden Christians. Kunchi is held from October 7 to 9 every year and is considered one of the major festivals of Japan, along with the Gion Matsuri and Osaka's Tenjin Matsuri. It has been designated as an Important Intangible Cultural Asset.
- Yutate-sai - A theatrical ritual, originally performed by yamabushi, a priest demonstrates his communion with the kami by plunging his hands into boiling water unharmed. This ritual was performed on the opening of Suwa Shrine, and is continued to be performed to this day. It is very rare at other Shinto shrines.

== English language fortunes ==
Most Shinto shrines sell omikuji, a type of fortune telling that comes on a slip of paper that lists your particular luck at that time. Suwa Shrine was the first shrine in Japan to offer omikuji in English.

== Stop lions ==
Another unique feature of Suwa Shrine are the "stop lions". They are two stone-carved guardian lions, and tradition holds that if one wishes to stop a behavior, such as smoking, one should tie a piece of paper or string around their front legs and pray for their assistance.
