= Kyūragi Station =

Railway station in Karatsu, Saga Prefecture, Japan

Kyūragi Station 厳木駅
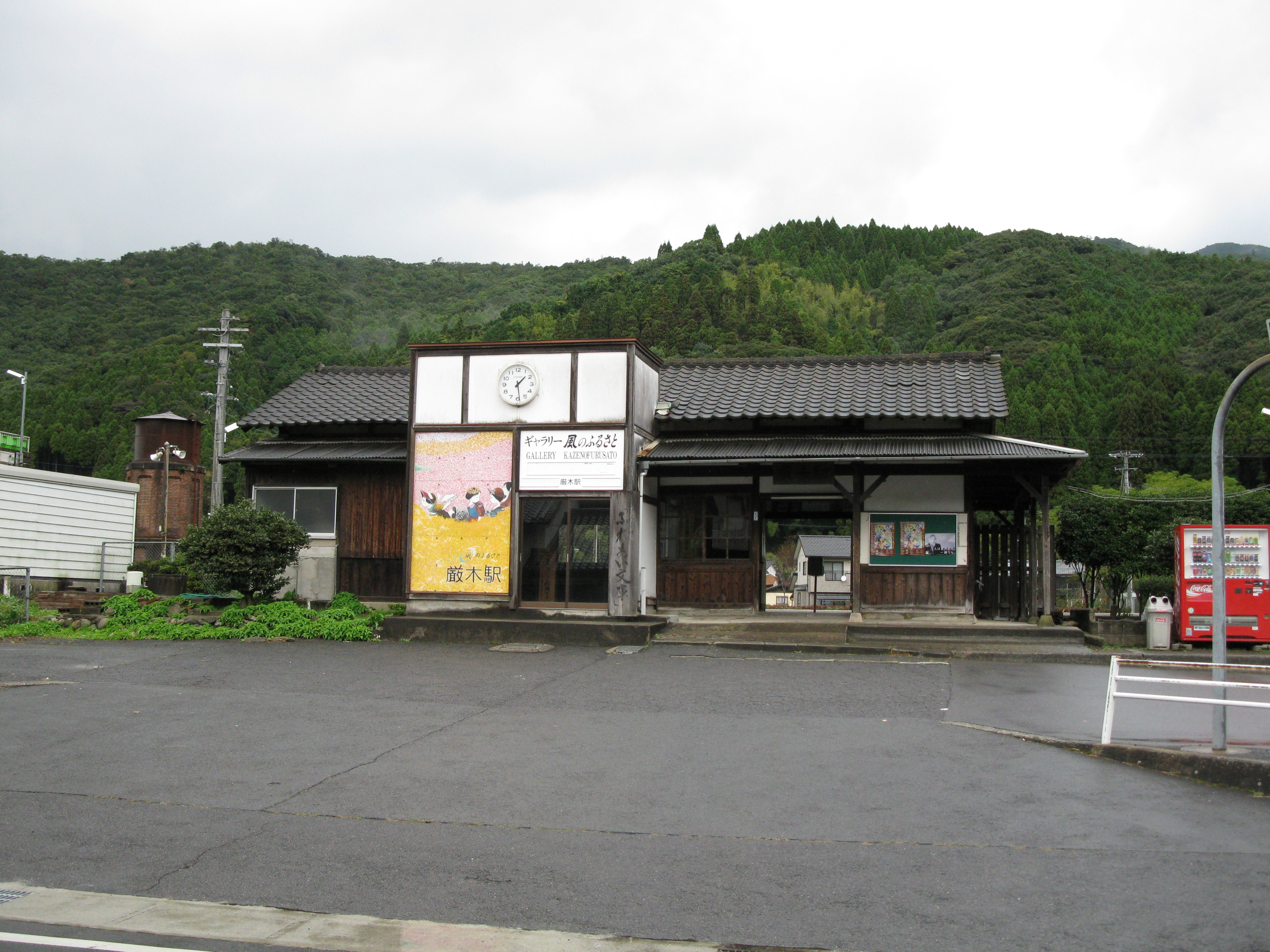
- Kyūragi Station in 2009

General information
- Location: Kyuragimachi Kyuragi, Karatsu-shi, Saga-ken 849-3131; Japan
- Coordinates: 33°19′24″N 130°03′37″E
- Operator: JR Kyushu
- Line: JK Karatsu Line
- Distance: 20.8 km from Kubota
- Platforms: 2 side platforms
- Tracks: 2 + 2 sidings

Construction
- Structure type: At grade
- Accessible: No - platforms linked by footbridge

Other information
- Status: Unstaffed
- Website: Official website

History
- Opened: 13 June 1899

Passengers
- 2016 (among JR Kyushu stations): 328 daily

Services
Preceding station	JR Kyushu	Following station
Taku towards Kubota	Karatsu Line	Iwaya towards Nishi-Karatsu
Location
- Location within Saga Prefecture Location within Japan

Kyūragi Station (厳木駅, Kyūragi-eki) is a passenger railway station operated by JR Kyushu located in the city of Karatsu, Saga Prefecture, Japan.

== Lines ==
The station is served by the Karatsu Line and is located 20.8 km from the starting point of the line at Kubota.

== Station layout ==
The station consists of two side platforms serving two tracks. Two sidings branch off the main tracks. The station building is of timber construction and is unstaffed, serving only as a waiting room. Access to the opposite side platform is by means of a footbridge.

=== Platforms ===
1	■ JK Karatsu Line	for Karatsu and Nishi-Karatsu
2	■ JK Karatsu Line	for Saga

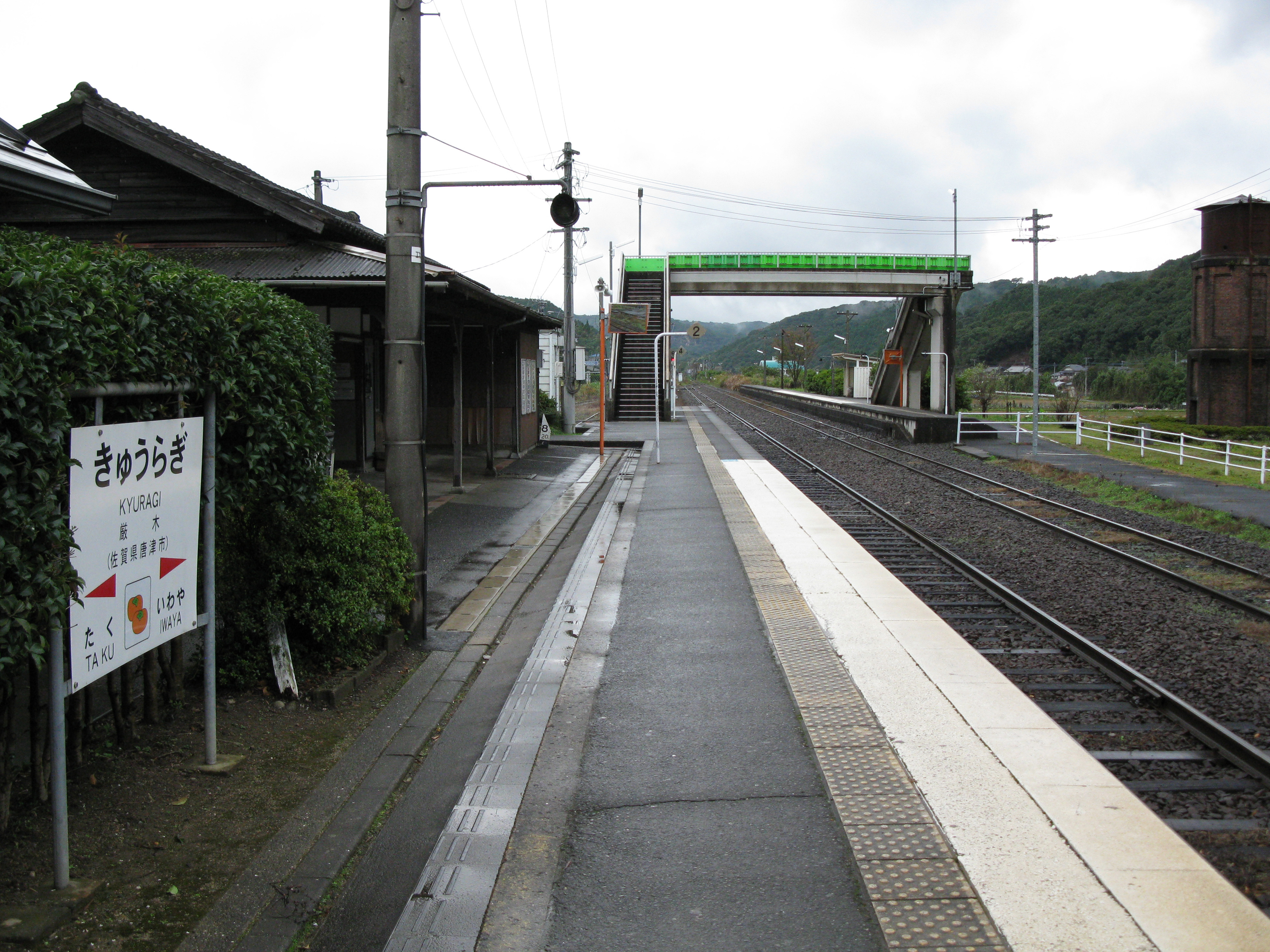
A view of the platforms and tracks. the sidings can be seen behind the footbridge to the left.

== History ==
On 1 December 1898, the Karatsu Kogyo Railway had opened a track from Miyoken (now Nishi-Karatsu) to Yamamoto. On 13 June 1899, the track was extended to Kyūragi which became the new eastern terminus. On 25 December 1899, Kyūragi became a through-station when the track was extended further east to Azamibaru (now Taku). On 23 February 1902, the company, now renamed the Karatsu Railway, merged with the Kyushu Railway. On 1 November 1903, the station was renamed Iwaya. When the Kyushu Railway was nationalized on 1 July 1907, Japanese Government Railways (JGR) took over control of the station. On 12 October 1909, the line which served the station was designated the Karatsu Line. With the privatization of Japanese National Railways (JNR), the successor of JGR, on 1 April 1987, control of the station passed to JR Kyushu.

== Passenger statistics ==
In fiscal 2016, the station was used by an average of 238 passengers daily (boarding passengers only), and it ranked 298th among the busiest stations of JR Kyushu.

== Surrounding area ==
- Japan National Route 203
- Karatsu City Hall Kyūragi Branch
- Saga Prefectural Kyūragi High School
- Kyūragi Post office

== See also ==
- List of railway stations in Japan
