= Japan National Route 204 =

National highway in Japan

National Route 204
- 国道204号
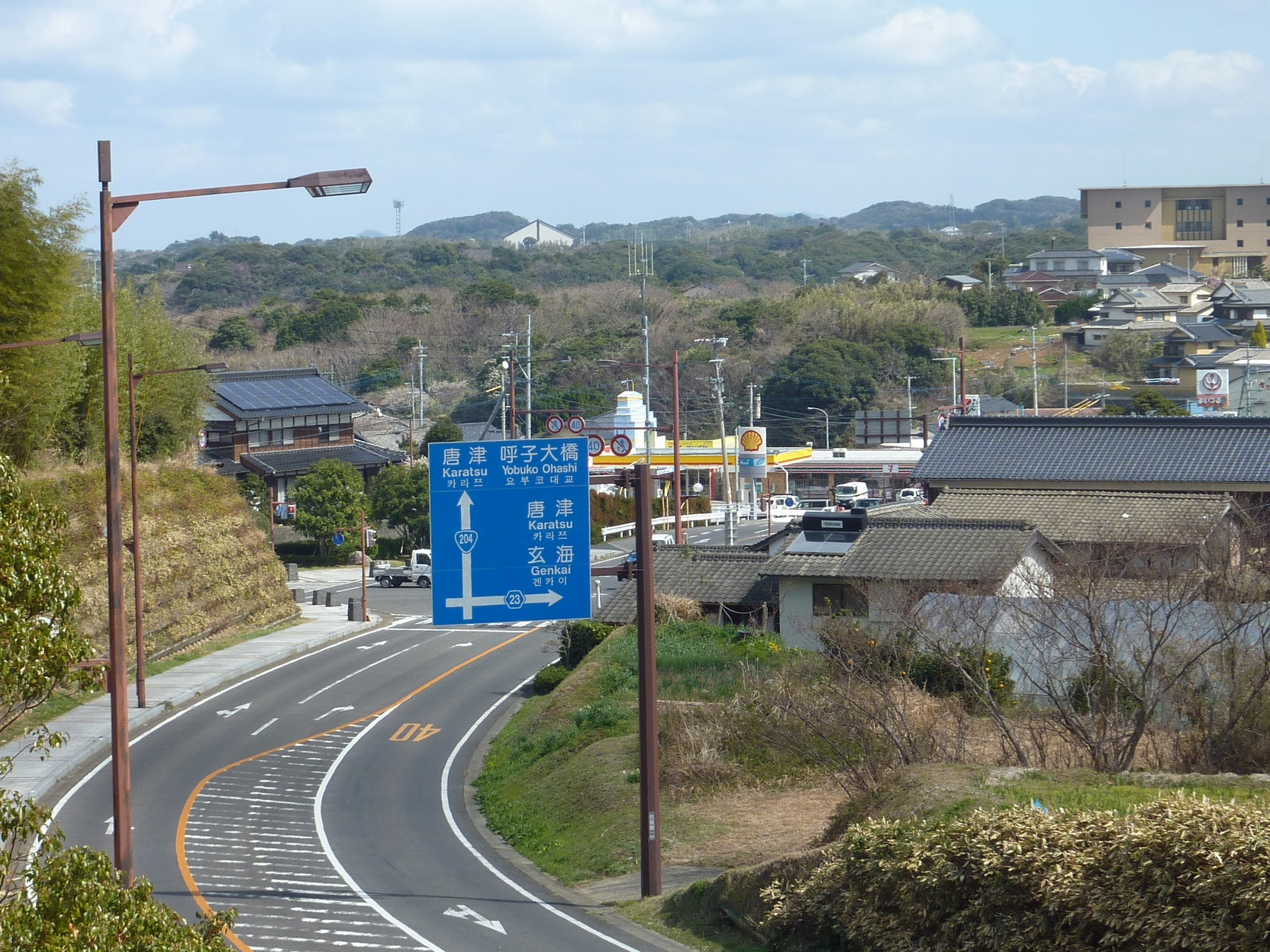

Route information
- Length: 157 km (98 mi)
- Existed: 18 May 1953–present

Major junctions
- North end: National Route 202 in Karatsu
- South end: National Route 35 in Sasebo

Location
- Country: Japan

Highway system
- National highways of Japan; Expressways of Japan
← National Route 203	→ National Route 205

National Route 204 is a national highway of Japan connecting Karatsu and Sasebo in Japan, with a total length of 157 km (97.56 mi).
