= Nagasaki Kunchi =

Festival in Nagasaki, Japan

Coordinates: 32°45′14.85″N 129°52′55.6″E

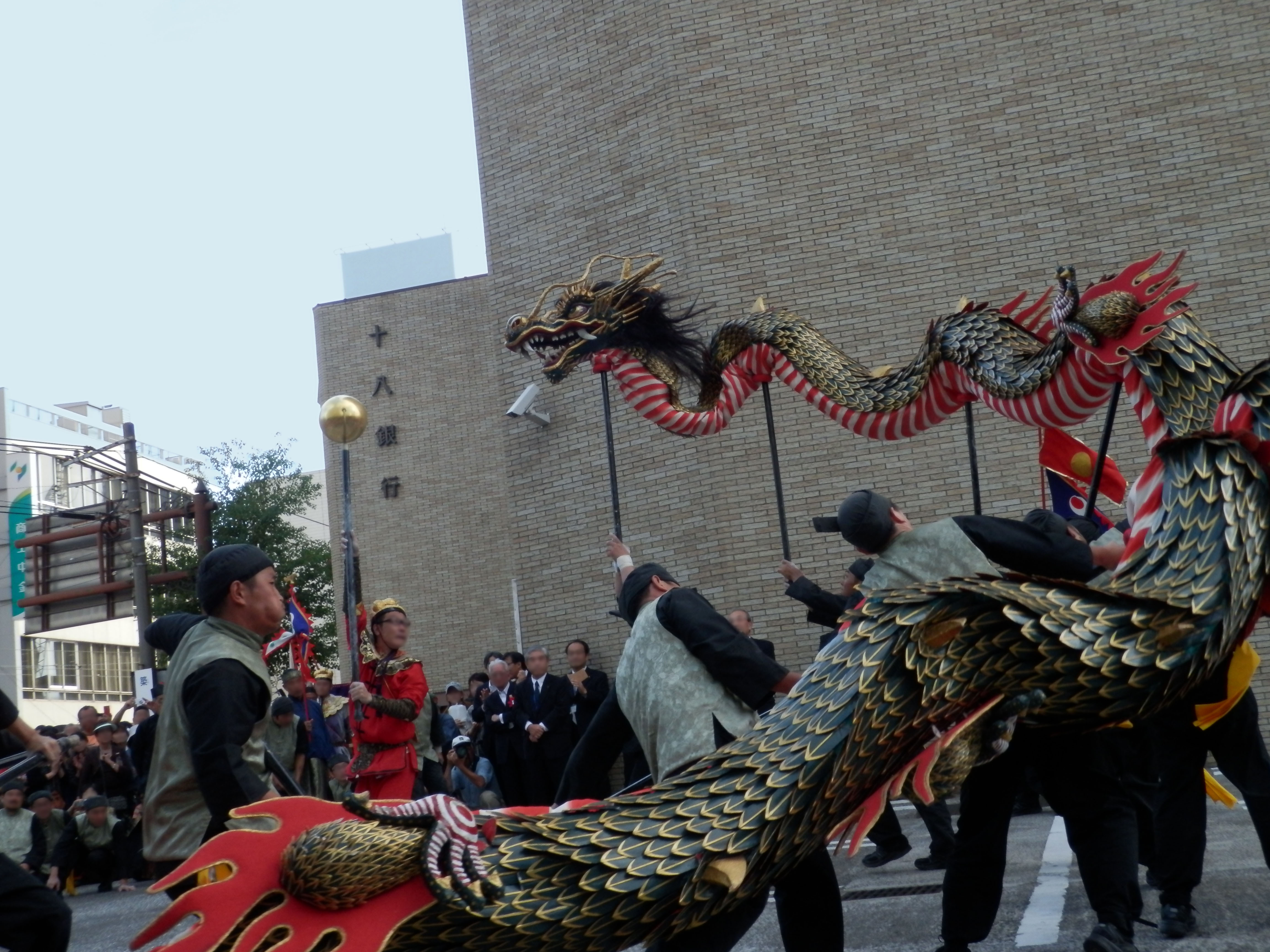
Dragon dance of Kagomachi during the Nagasaki Kunchi

Kunchi (くんち), also Nagasaki Kunchi (長崎くんち) or Nagasaki Okunchi (長崎おくんち), is the most famous festival held in Nagasaki, Japan. From October 7–9, the presentations of the festival, which vividly reflect Nagasaki's colourful history, spill over from the three festival sites into the streets and create an atmosphere of celebration throughout the city.

== Background ==
The event began as a celebration of autumn harvests in the late 16th century and became a shrine festival when Suwa Shrine was founded in 1614. The name kunchi is derived from the word kunichi (九日, the ninth day of the ninth lunar month of the year). The festival originally began on the seventh day of the month and lasted through the ninth day, maintained today as Okunchi's start date of October 7 and end date of October 9.

According to local explanation, another purpose was to check for hidden Christians after the ban on Christianity. This is still evident today in the custom of garden showing (庭見せ, niwamise), when the presenting neighbourhoods open up their homes to public scrutiny.

== Performances ==
One of the most famous performances of the festival is the Dragon Dance ( jaodori (龍踊り, dragon dance)), which was originally performed on New Year's Eve by the Chinese residents of Nagasaki. Rehearsals for the festival begin on June 1. The festival includes a number of other folk performing arts, including kujira no shiofuki (鯨の潮吹き, the blowing of the whale), kokkodesho (コッコデショ, drum dance), and Oranda manzai (阿蘭陀万才, Dutch dance).

== See also ==
- Karatsu Kunchi
