= Karatsu Castle =

Castle in Karatsu, Saga Prefecture, Japan

Coordinates: 33°27′13″N 129°58′41″E

Karatsu Castle 唐津城
- Saga, Saga Prefecture, Japan
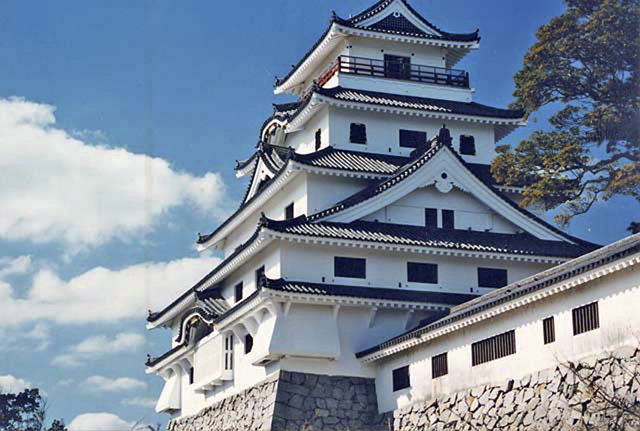
- Donjon of Karatsu Castle

Site information
- Type: Hirayama-style Japanese castle
- Owner: reconstructed 1966
- Open to the public: yes

Site history
- Built: 1602-1609
- Built by: Terasawa Hirotaka
- In use: Edo period
- Demolished: 1872

Karatsu Castle (唐津城, Karatsu-jō) is a Japanese castle located in Karatsu, Saga Prefecture, Japan. It is a hirayamajiro, a castle built on a plain rather than a hill or mountain. At the end of the Edo period, Karatsu castle was home to the Ogasawara clan, daimyō of Karatsu Domain. It was also known as "Dancing Crane Castle" (舞鶴城, Maizuru-jō).

== Location ==
Karatsu Castle, which stands beside Karatsu Bay, is unusual in that the stonework rises directly out of the water, using the ocean as a natural moat. It is a medium-size castle with the Honmaru (inner bailey) located on top of Mount Manto, the Ni-no-maru (2nd bailey) and the San-no-maru (3rd bailey) in the west, and the outer structures to the south.

The Ni-no-maru secondary bailey contained the palace of the daimyō of Karatsu and the domain’s administrative offices. The innermost bailey would normally contain a donjon; however there is considerable dispute as to whether or not it actually ever did. Records indicate that a stone foundation base existed from at least 1627, but the Tokugawa government never authorized the construction of a donjon tower. The present donjon is a modern reconstruction based on artists assumptions on what a Keichō period (1596–1615) donjon should look like.

== History ==
Terasawa Hirotaka, a retainer of Toyotomi Hideyoshi, became lord of Karatsu in 1595. In the Battle of Sekigahara in 1600, he joined the forces of Tokugawa Ieyasu and attacked Gifu Castle. He was rewarded with greater lands around Karatsu, forming a dominion of 123,000 koku. In 1598, he abandoned his original castle of Nagoya Castle, and started work on a new castle at Karatsu, using many materials from the old one, from 1602 1608. The Tokugawa shogunate ordered neighboring tozama domains to contribute to its construction, and they did so primarily by excavating its network of moats. In 1637, in part due to his failure to suppress the Shimabara rebellion, his lands were confiscated by the Shogunate. Karatsu Domain was given over to the control of the Ōkubo clan (1649–1678), Matsudaira (Ogyū) clan (1678–1691), the Doi clan (1691–1762), Mizuno clan (1762–1817), until finally coming into the possession of the Ogasawara clan in 1762.

In June 1869, the title of daimyo was abolished, and in 1871, Karatsu Domain itself was abolished with the abolition of the han system, and became part of the new Saga Prefecture. Karatsu Castle was pulled down shortly afterwards, and in its place Maizuru Park was established in 1877.

The current donjon and some other structures of the castle were reconstructed in 1966 to boost local tourism and to function as a local museum. The current donjon features five tiers and five stories, with a lower ground floor; it also houses an exhibition area. Many of the yagura date from the same time, although the Tatsumi Yagura was added in 1990.

== Literature ==
- De Lange, William (2021). An Encyclopedia of Japanese Castles. Groningen: Toyo Press. pp. 600 pages. ISBN 978-9492722300.
- Schmorleitz, Morton S. (1974). Castles in Japan. Tokyo: Charles E. Tuttle Co. pp. 144–145. ISBN 0-8048-1102-4.
- Motoo, Hinago (1986). Japanese Castles. Tokyo: Kodansha. p. 200 pages. ISBN 0-87011-766-1.
- Mitchelhill, Jennifer (2004). Castles of the Samurai: Power and Beauty. Tokyo: Kodansha. p. 112 pages. ISBN 4-7700-2954-3.
- Turnbull, Stephen (2003). Japanese Castles 1540-1640. Osprey Publishing. p. 64 pages. ISBN 1-84176-429-9.
