= Karatsu Kunchi =

Festival in Japan

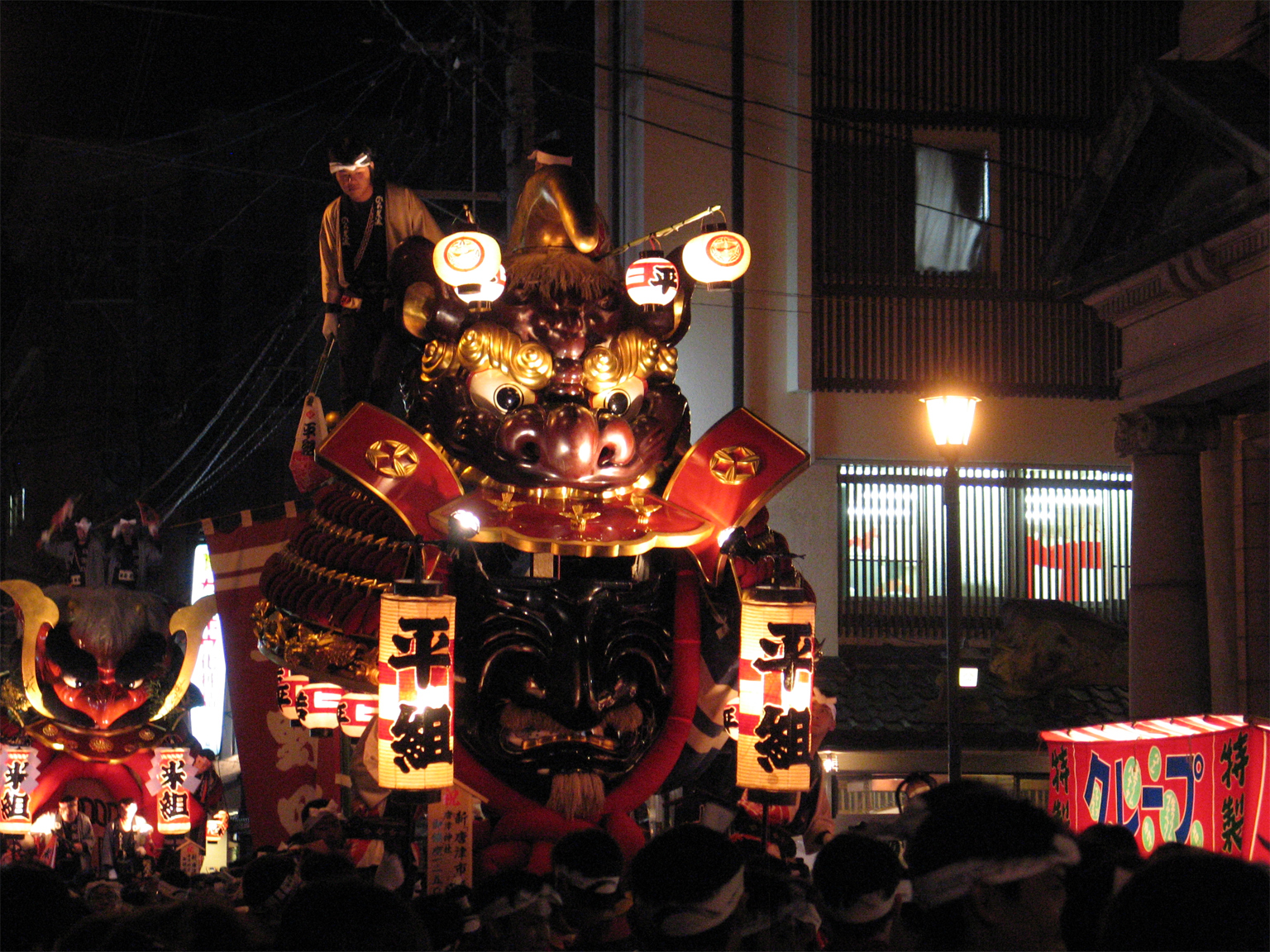
Floats make their way through the streets of Karatsu on the opening night of the festival.

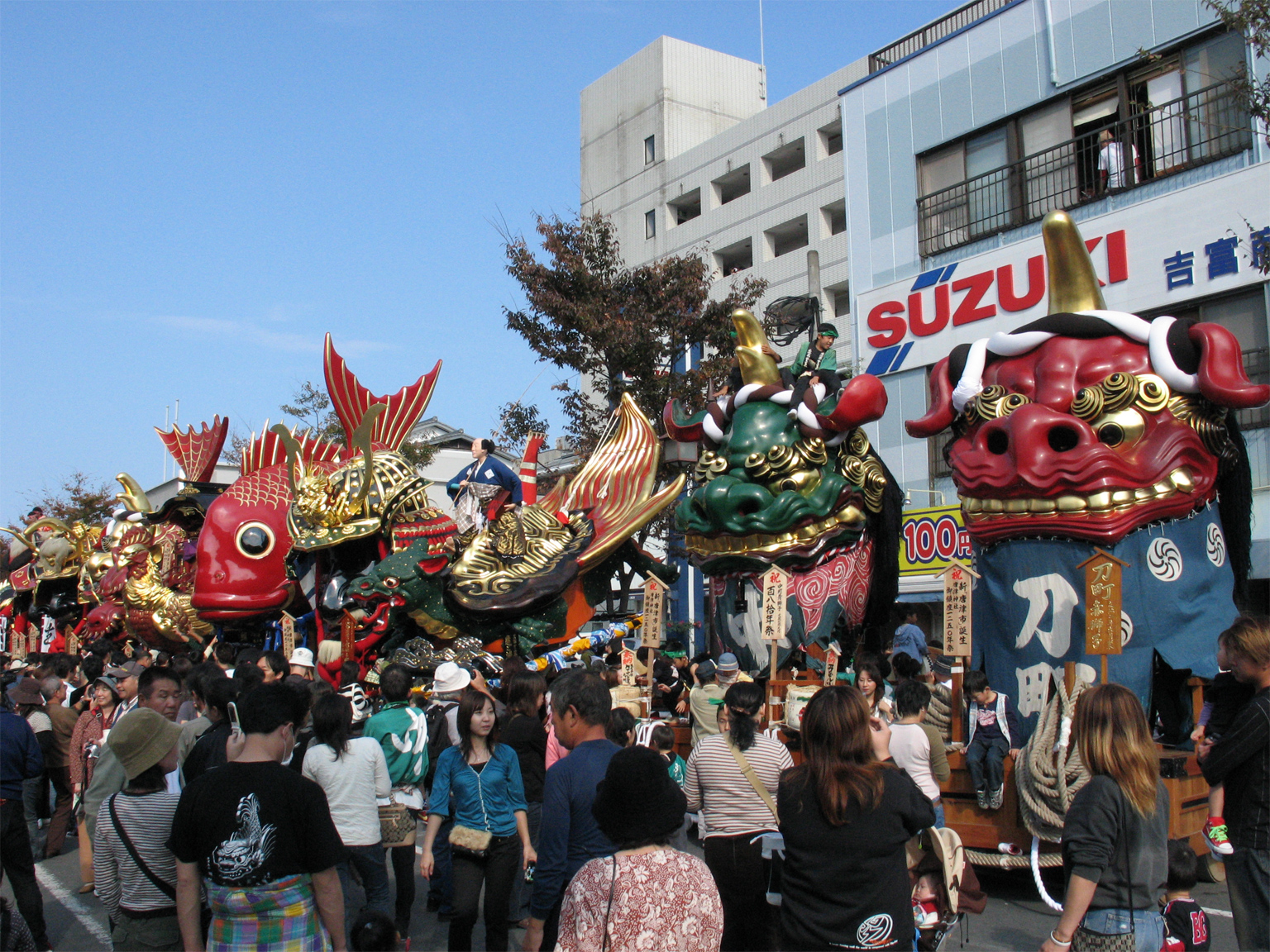
Hikiyama on display. The red lion on the right is the oldest, being built in 1819.

Karatsu Kunchi (唐津くんち; the suffix "kunchi" simply meaning festival) is a Japanese matsuri that takes place annually in November in the city of Karatsu, Saga Prefecture, on Japan's island of Kyūshū.

== About ==
The event takes place on 2-4 November, when the 3rd is a national holiday in Japan called Culture Day. It is the major event of the Karatsu calendar, regularly drawing crowds of anywhere between 150,000 and 500,000 people from the surrounding area over the course of the event.

The festival features daily parades of fourteen hikiyama, massive floats in the form of samurai helmets, sea bream, dragons, and other fantastical creatures, all constructed from wood, lacquer, and other materials. Each float — which stand between five and six meters, and which weigh anywhere from two to five tons — is drawn through the streets of the city by teams of bearers selected from families living in the fourteen traditional neighborhoods of Karatsu, to the chant of "En-ya! En-ya! En-ya!"(or"Yoi-sa! Yoi-sa! Yoi-sa!") and the music of taiko drummers and flutists perched on the floats' base.

The event, which is coordinated by the local Shinto shrine (near which the floats are stored during the rest of the year), has been held for several centuries now; the current incarnations of the floats were constructed between 1819 and 1876. In 1980, the festival was designated an "Important Intangible Folk Cultural Property".

== List of hikiyama ==
Includes the name of the float, the district it represents, and its construction date:

1. The Red lion (赤獅子) built by the Katana-machi district (1819)
2. The Green lion (中町の青獅子) built by the Naka-machi district (1824)
3. The Turtle and Urashima Taro (カメと浦島太郎) by the Zaimoku-machi district (1841)
  - It was not Taro originally but a gem on the turtle when it was first built.
4. Samurai Minamoto Yoshitsune's Kabuto (源義経の兜) by Gofuku-machi (1844)
5. The Sea bream(鯛) by Uoya-machi (1845)
6. The Phoenix-shaped ship (鳳凰丸) by Oishi-machi (1846)
7. The Flying dragon (飛龍) by Shin-machi (1846)
8. The Golden lion (金獅子) by Hom-machi (1847)
9. 'Takeda Shingen's Kabuto '(武田信玄の兜) by Kiwata-machi (1864)
10. 'Uesugi Kenshin's Kabuto '(上杉謙信の兜) by Hirano-machi (1869)
11. The Drunken ogre on Minamoto Yorimitsu's Kabuto (酒呑童子と源頼光の兜) (1869)
12. The Lion on an orb (珠取獅子) by Kyo-machi (1875)
13. The Tiger-headed orca(鯱) by Kako-machi (1876)
14. The Boat of seven treasures (七宝丸) by Egawa-machi (1876)
15. Disappeared: The black lion (黒獅子) by Konya-machi

== See also ==
- Nagasaki Kunchi
