= Japan National Route 203 =

National highway in Japan

National Route 203
- 国道203号
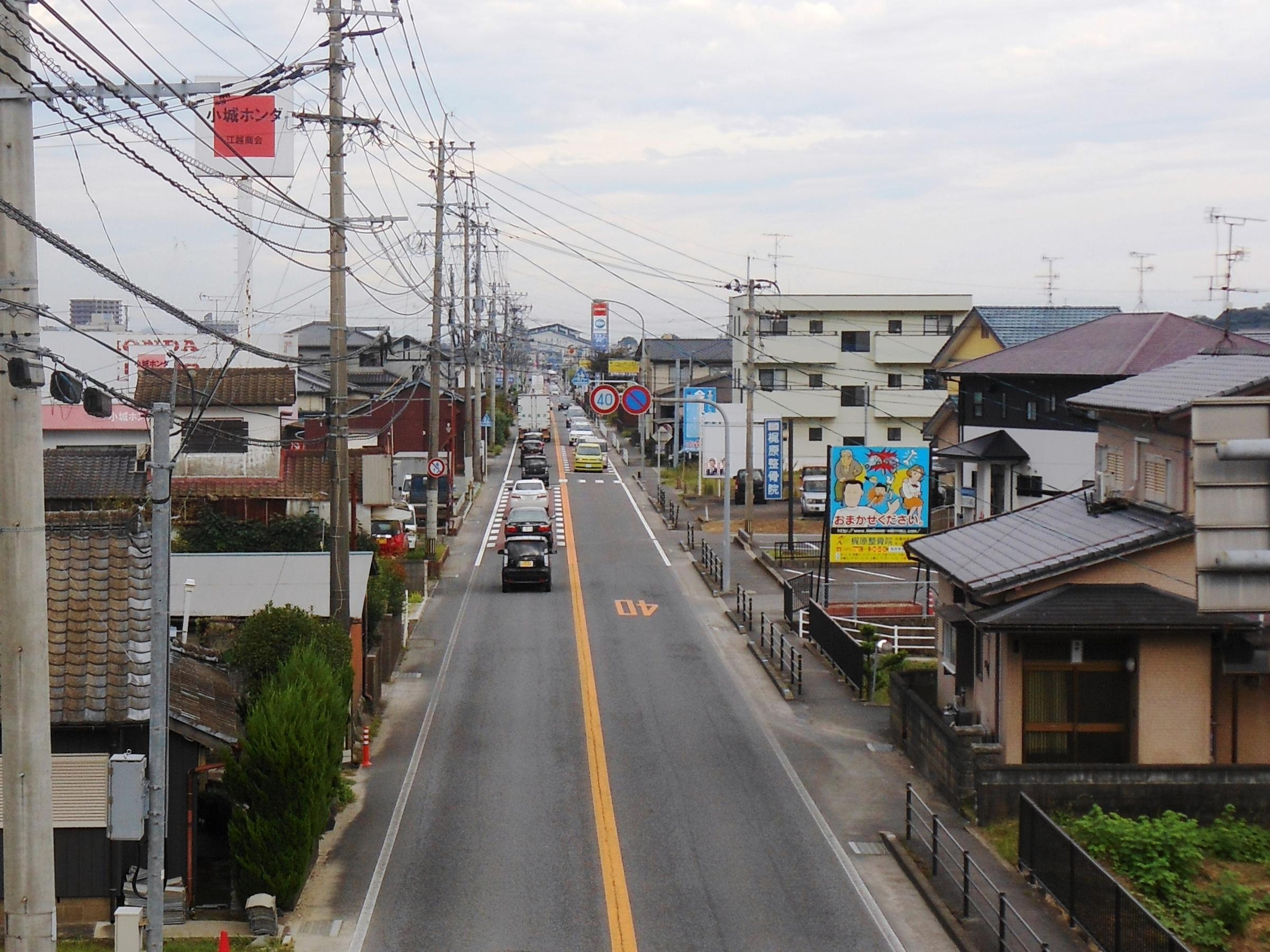

Route information
- Length: 47.3 km (29.4 mi)
- Existed: 18 May 1953–present

Major junctions
- North end: National Route 202 in Karatsu
- South end: National Route 34 in Saga

Location
- Country: Japan

Highway system
- National highways of Japan; Expressways of Japan
← National Route 202	→ National Route 204

National Route 203 is a national highway of Japan connecting Karatsu and Saga in Japan, with a total length of 47.3 km (29.39 mi).
