= Japan National Route 202 =

National highway in Japan

National Route 202
- 国道202号
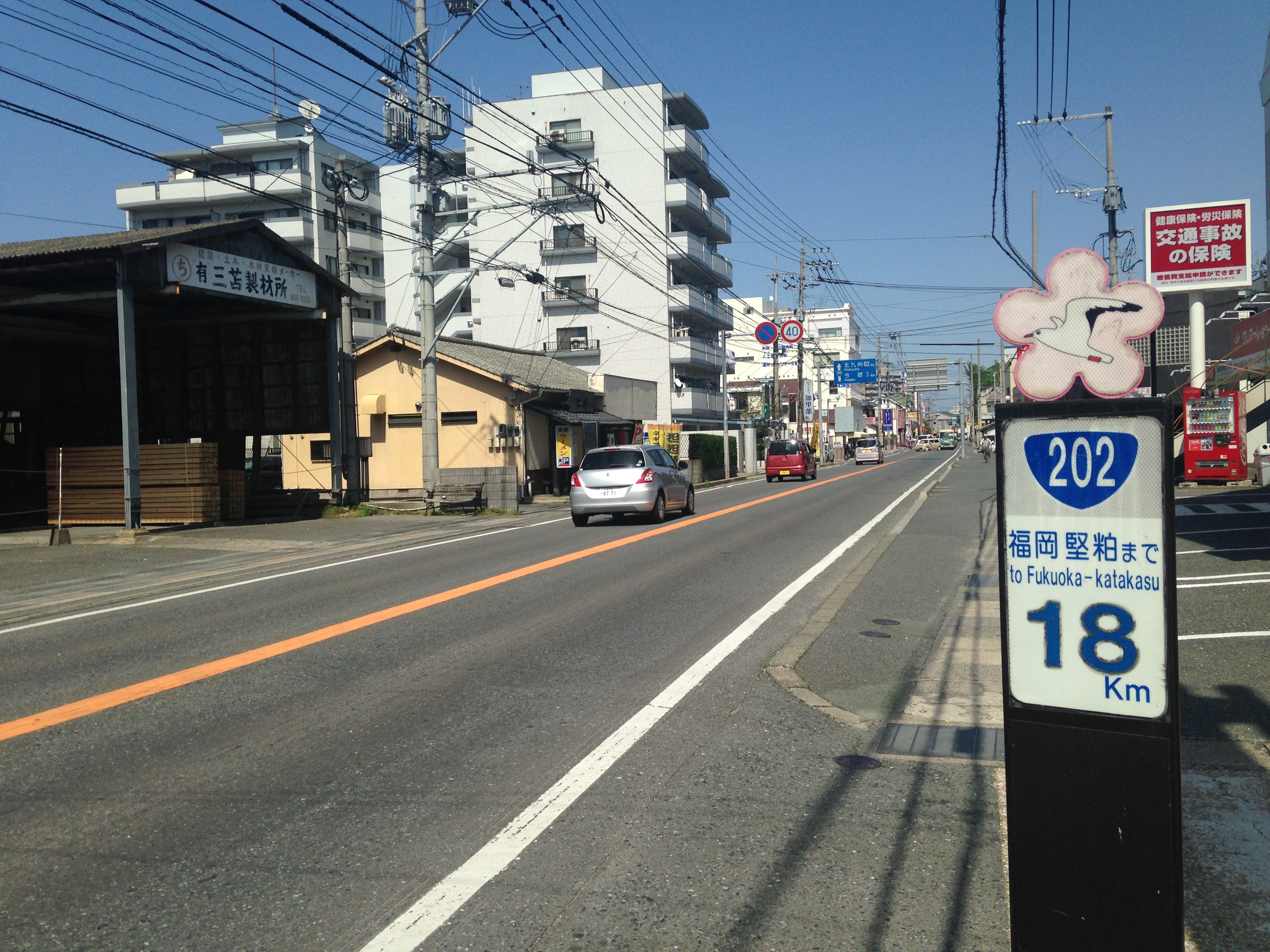

Route information
- Length: 199.6 km (124.0 mi)
- Existed: 18 May 1953–present

Major junctions
- North end: National Route 3 in Hakata-ku, Fukuoka
- South end: National Route 34 in Nagasaki

Location
- Country: Japan

Highway system
- National highways of Japan; Expressways of Japan
← National Route 201	→ National Route 203

National Route 202 is a national highway of Japan connecting Hakata-ku, Fukuoka and Nagasaki in Japan, with a total length of 199.6 km (124.03 mi).
