= Nijinomatsubara Station =

Railway station in Karatsu, Saga Prefecture, Japan

Nijinomatsubara Station 虹ノ松原駅
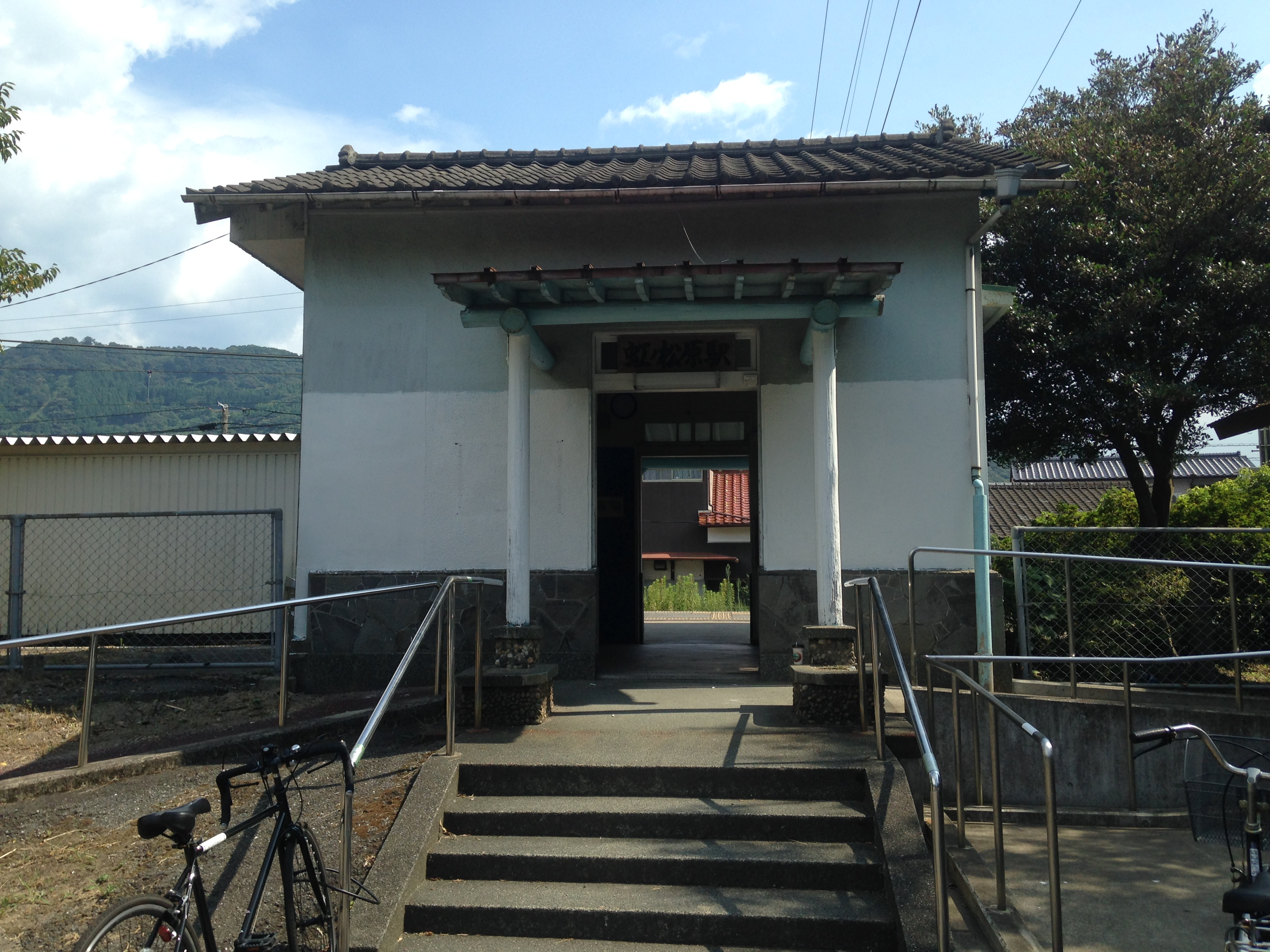
- Nijinomatsubara Station in 2016

General information
- Location: Kagami, Karatsu-shi, Saga-ken 847-0022; Japan
- Coordinates: 33°26′28″N 130°00′58″E
- Operator: JR Kyushu
- Line: JK Chikuhi Line
- Distance: 37.5 km from Meinohama
- Platforms: 1 side platform
- Tracks: 1

Construction
- Structure type: At grade
- Parking: Available at station forecourt
- Accessible: Yes - ramp to station building and platform

Other information
- Status: Unstaffed
- Website: Official website

History
- Opened: 7 July 1924; 102 years ago

Passengers
- FY2015: 154 daily

Services
| Preceding station | JR Kyushu | Following station |
|---|---|---|
| Higashi-Karatsu towards Nishi-Karatsu | Chikuhi Line Local | Hamasaki towards Meinohama |
Location
- Location within Saga Prefecture Location within Japan

Nijinomatsubara Station (虹ノ松原駅, Nijinomatsubara-eki) is a passenger railway station located in the city of Karatsu, Saga Prefecture, Japan. It is operated by JR Kyushu and is on the Chikuhi Line. The station is set within the Nijinomatsubara pine forest, which gives it its name.

== Lines ==
The station is served by the Chikuhi Line and is located 37.5 km from the starting point of the line at Meinohama. Only local services on the Chikuhi Line stop at this station.

== Station layout ==
The station consists of a side platform serving a single track. The station building is a simple wooden shed of traditional Japanese design with a tiled roof. It is unstaffed and serves to only to house a waiting room and an automatic ticket machine.

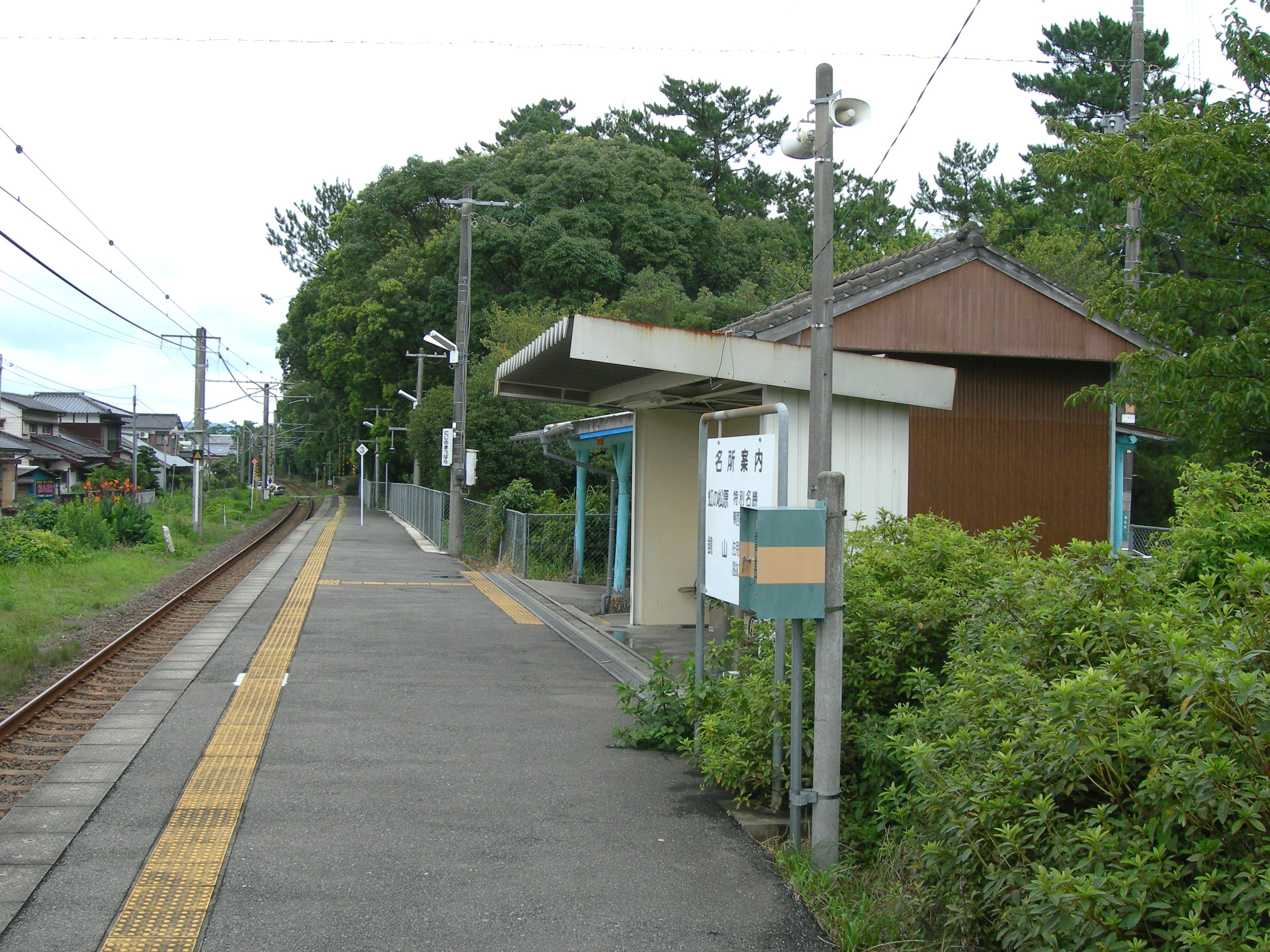
A view of the station platform and track.

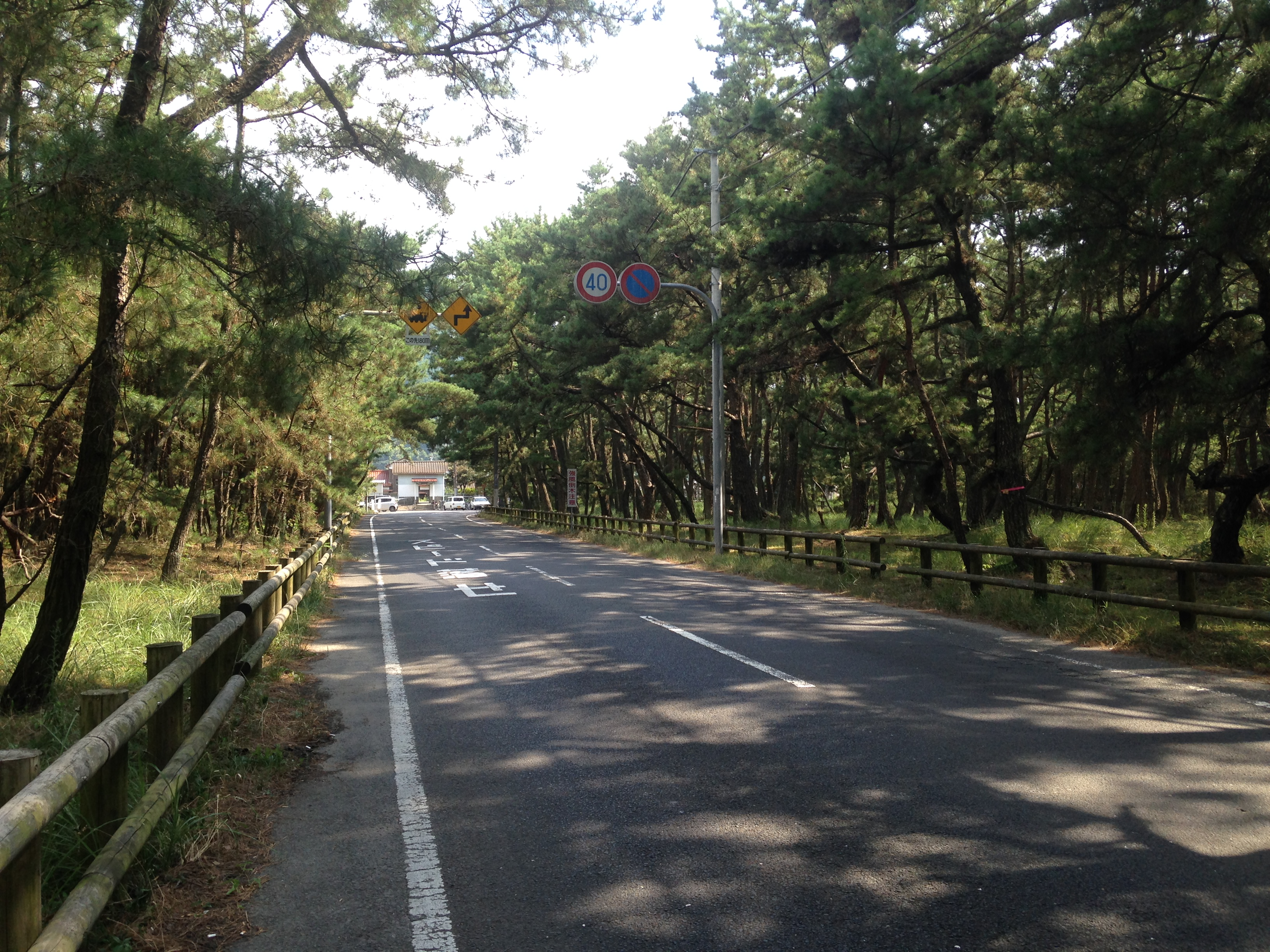
Approach road. The station is set within the Nijinomatsubara pine forest.

== History ==
The private Kitakyushu Railway had opened a line between Fukuyoshi and Hamasaki on 5 December 1923. On 7 July 1924, the line was extended westwards with Nijinomatsubara opening as its new western terminus. Nijinomatsubara became a through-station on 15 June 1925 when the line was extended to Higashi-Karatsu. When the Kitakyushu Railway was nationalized on 1 October 1937, Japanese Government Railways (JGR) took over control of the station. On the same day, the station name was in Japanese characters was changed from 虹の松原駅 to 虹ノ松原駅, a switch of the second character from hiragana to katakana, with no change in reading or transliteration. The line which served the station was designated the Chikuhi Line. With the privatization of Japanese National Railways (JNR), the successor of JGR, on 1 April 1987, control of the station passed to JR Kyushu.

== Passenger statistics ==
In fiscal 2015, there were a total of 56,268 boarding passengers, giving a daily average of 154 passengers.

== Surrounding area ==
- Nijinomatsubara
- Mount Kagami

== See also ==
- List of railway stations in Japan
