= List of places of scenic beauty of Japan (Saga) =

This list is of the places of scenic beauty of Japan located within the Prefecture of Saga.

== National Places of Scenic Beauty ==
As of 1 August 2019, two Places have been designated at a national level (including one *Special Place of Scenic Beauty).

Site	Municipality	Comments	Image	Coordinates	Type	Ref.
*Niji-no-Matsubara 虹の松原; Niji-no-Matsubara	Karatsu			33°26′39″N 130°00′44″E	3, 9	
Kunen-an (Former Itami Family Detached Residence) Gardens 九年庵 (旧伊丹氏別邸) 庭園; Kunen-an (kyū-Itami-shi bettei) teien	Kanzaki			33°21′27″N 130°21′50″E	1	

== Prefectural Places of Scenic Beauty ==
As of 1 August 2019, one Place has been designated at a prefectural level.

Place	Municipality	Comments	Image	Coordinates	Type	Ref.
Former Takeo Nabeshima Family Villa Gardens (Mifuneyama Rakuen) 旧武雄邑主鍋島氏別邸庭園（御船山楽園） kyū-Takeo yūshu Nabeshima-shi bettei teien (Mifuneyama Rakuen)	Takeo			33°10′56″N 130°01′03″E		

== Municipal Places of Scenic Beauty ==
As of 1 May 2018, zero Places have been designated at a municipal level.

== See also ==
- Cultural Properties of Japan
- List of Historic Sites of Japan (Saga)
- List of parks and gardens of Saga Prefecture
