= Yūtoku Inari Shrine =

Shinto shrine in Saga Prefecture, Japan

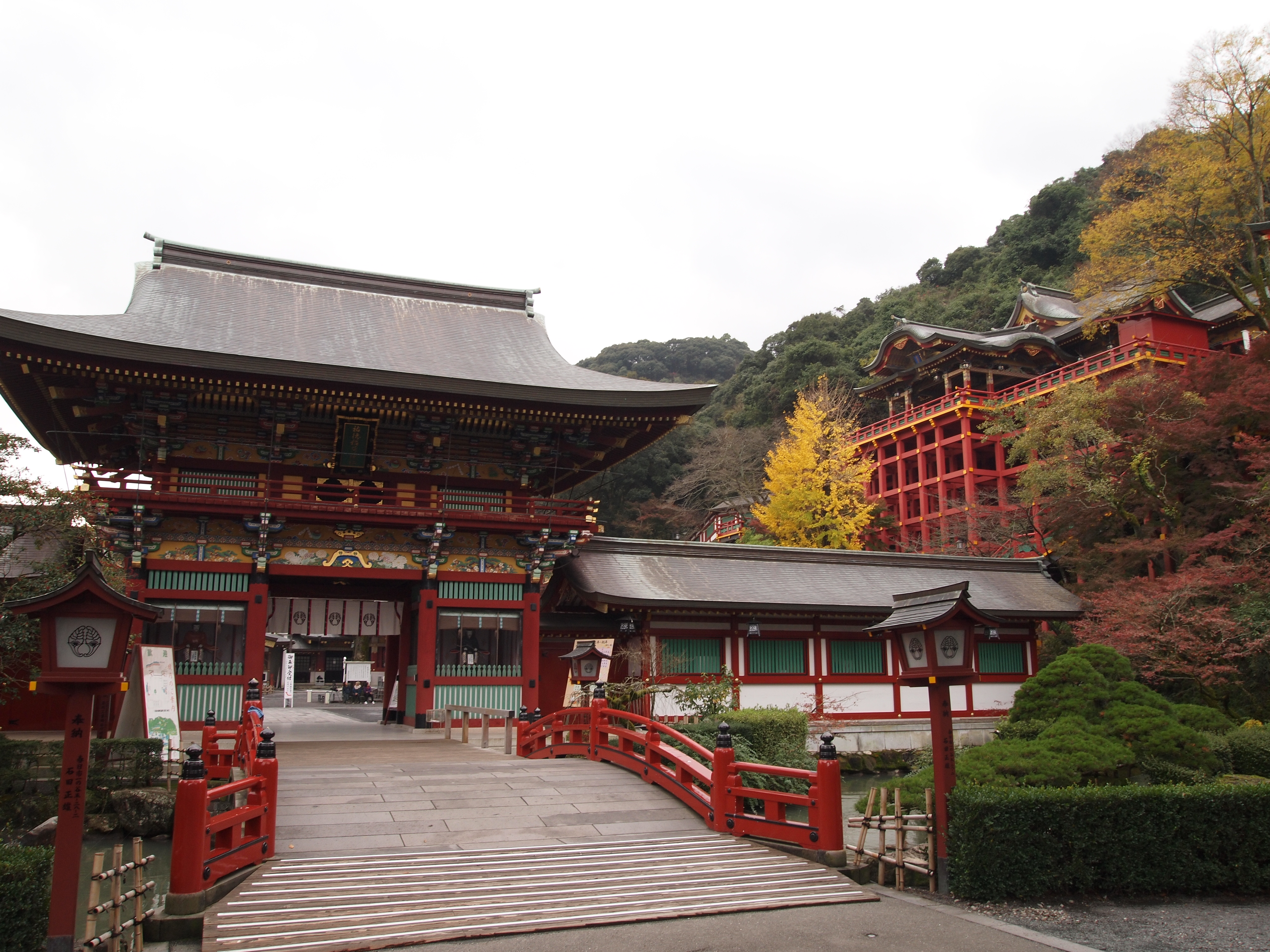
- Yūtoku Inari Shrine Entrance

- Location within Japan

Religion
- Affiliation: Shinto

Location
- Coordinates: 33°04′25″N 130°06′30″E

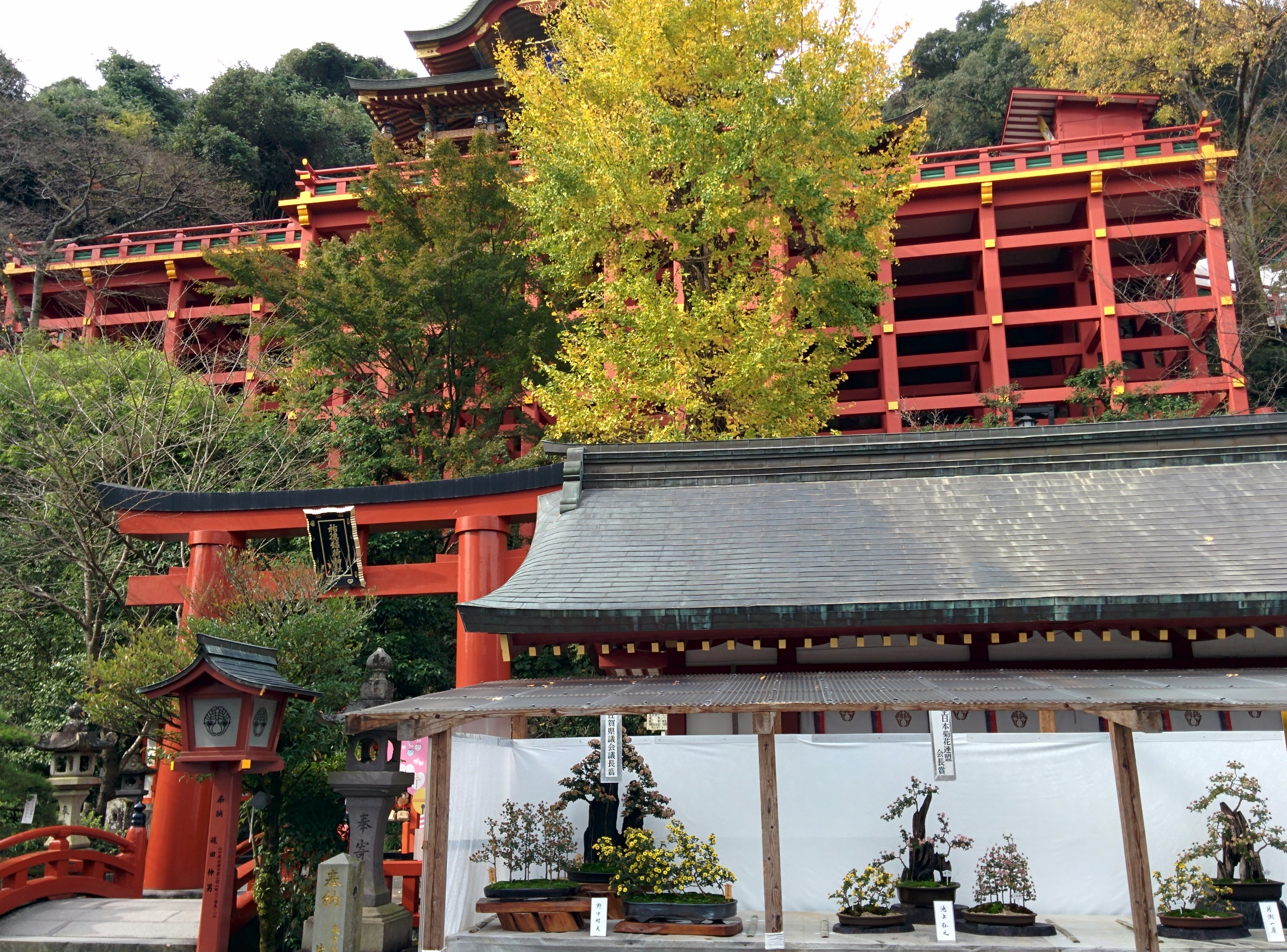
Yutoku Inari Shrine in the Autumn of 2015

Yūtoku Inari Shrine (祐徳稲荷神社, Yūtoku Inari Jinja) is a shrine located in Kashima City, Saga Prefecture. It is one of the most famous Inari shrines in Japan.

== History ==
Dedicated to Inari, the kami whose messengers are foxes, it is the third largest of its kind in Japan. It was constructed in 1688 as the family shrine of the Nabeshima clan who ruled what would become the Saga area (called Hizen at that time) during the Edo period. It was built to the Inari kami of the harvest by a princess from Kyoto named Manko Hime (萬子媛) who married Nabeshima Naotomo. The Nabeshima clan was entrusted with protecting Edo's interests in Kyūshū, in particular the city of Nagasaki, which was one of the few ports open to foreign contact during Japan's period of isolation.

The shrine is also popular for new year celebrations and is very crowded during the first two weeks of January.

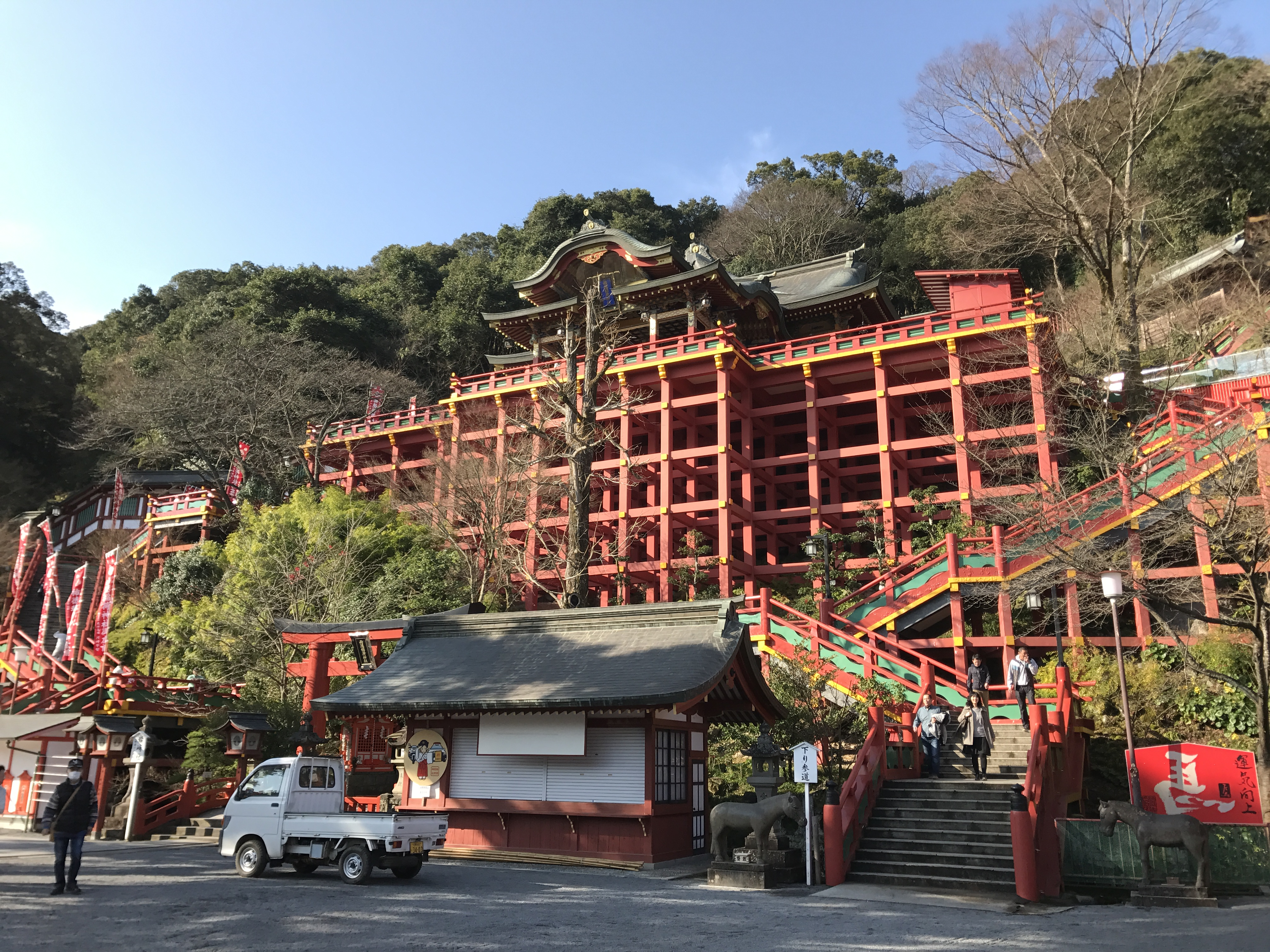

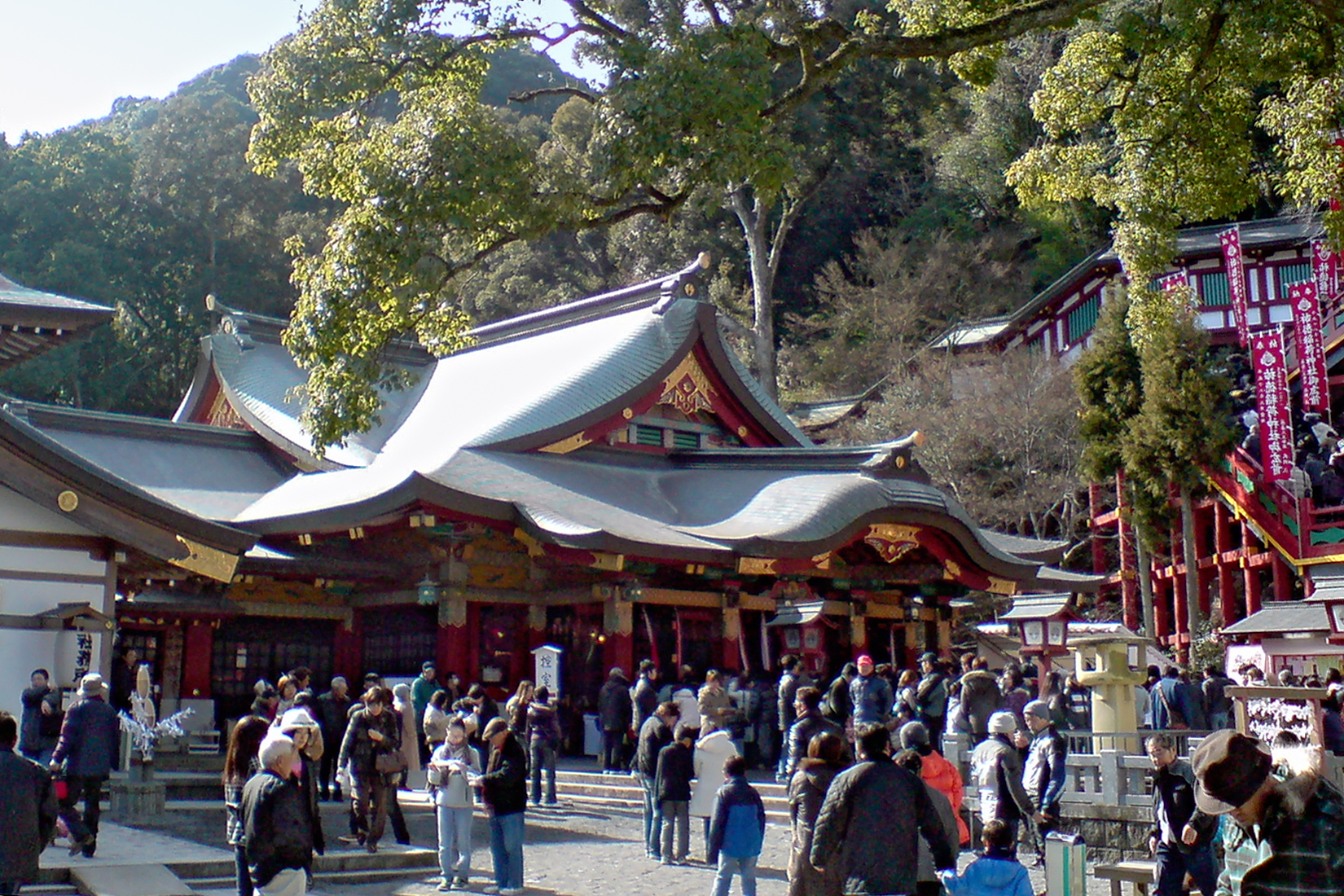

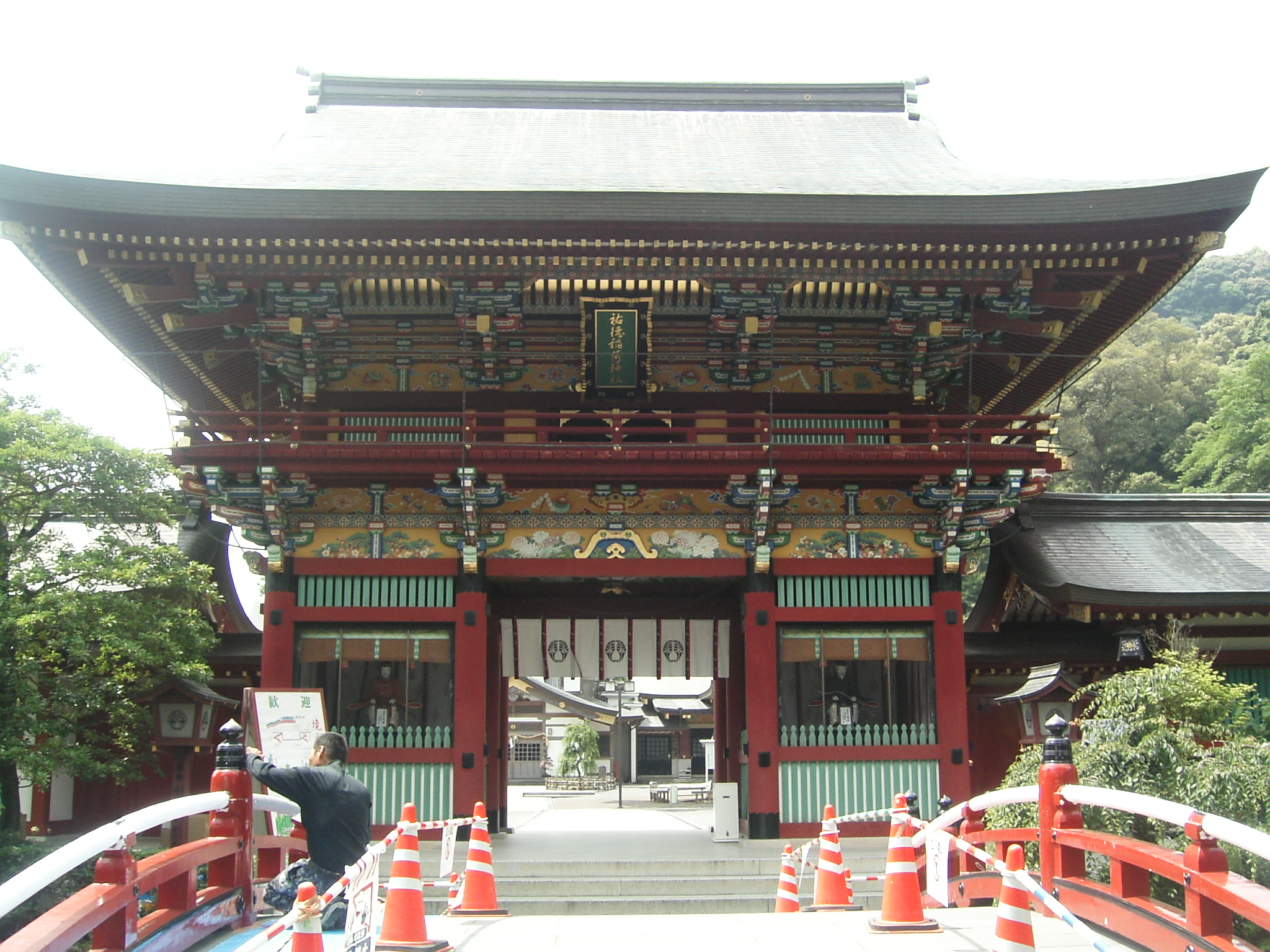

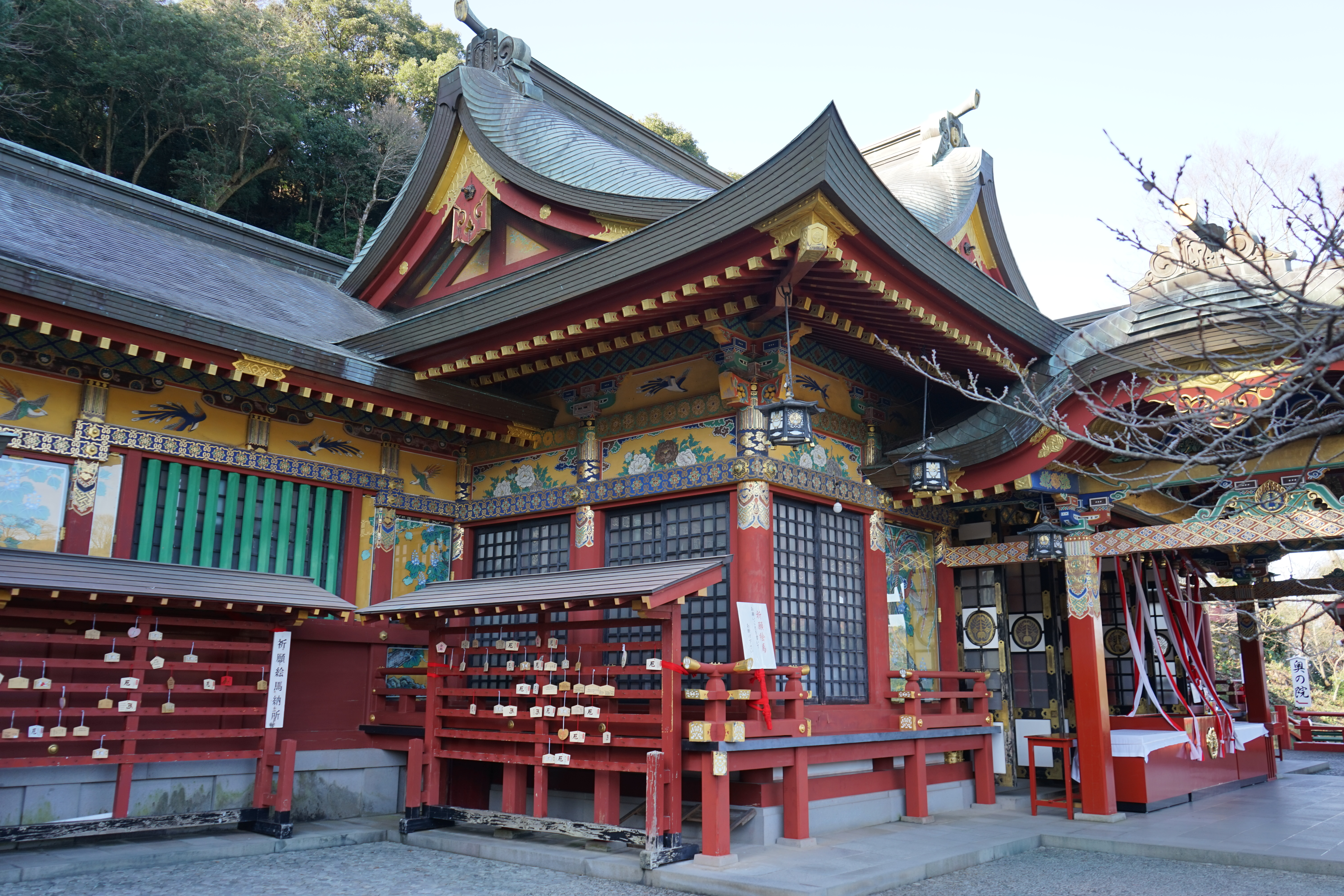

== See also ==
- Fushimi Inari
