= Taradake Prefectural Natural Park (Saga) =

Prefectural National Park in Saga, Japan

- 多良岳県立自然公園
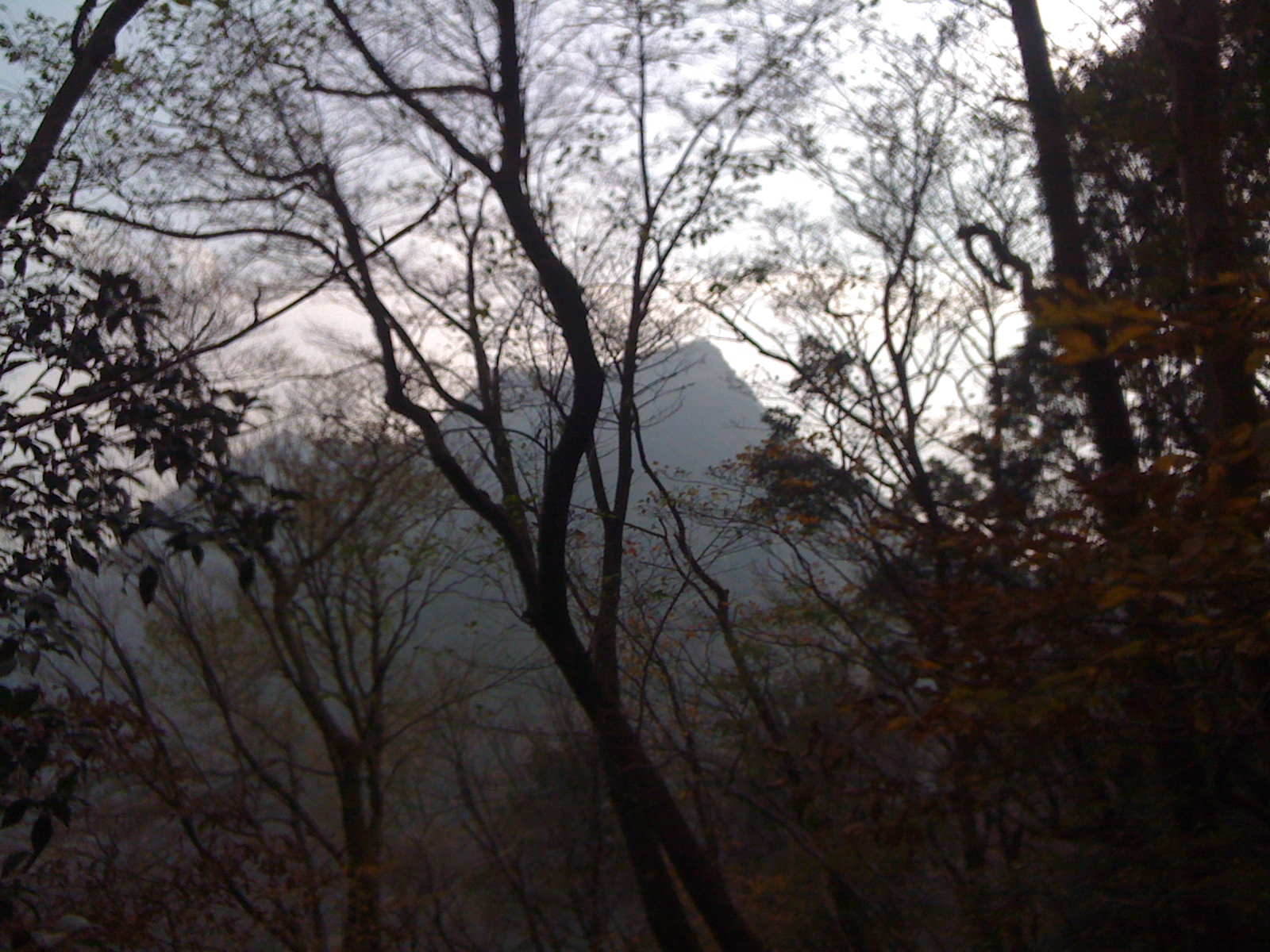
- Mount Tara (983 m)
- Interactive map of Taradake Prefectural Natural Park
- Location: Saga Prefecture, Japan
- Area: 44.98 km^{2} (17.37 sq mi)
- Established: 24 December 1952

Taradake Prefectural Natural Park (多良岳県立自然公園, Taradake kenritsu shizen kōen) is a Prefectural Natural Park in Saga Prefecture, Japan. Established in 1952, the park spans the municipalities of Kashima and Tara.

== See also ==
- National Parks of Japan
- Taradake Prefectural Natural Park (Nagasaki)
