= Kurokamiyama Prefectural Natural Park =

Natural park of Saga prefecture, Japan

- 黒髪山県立自然公園
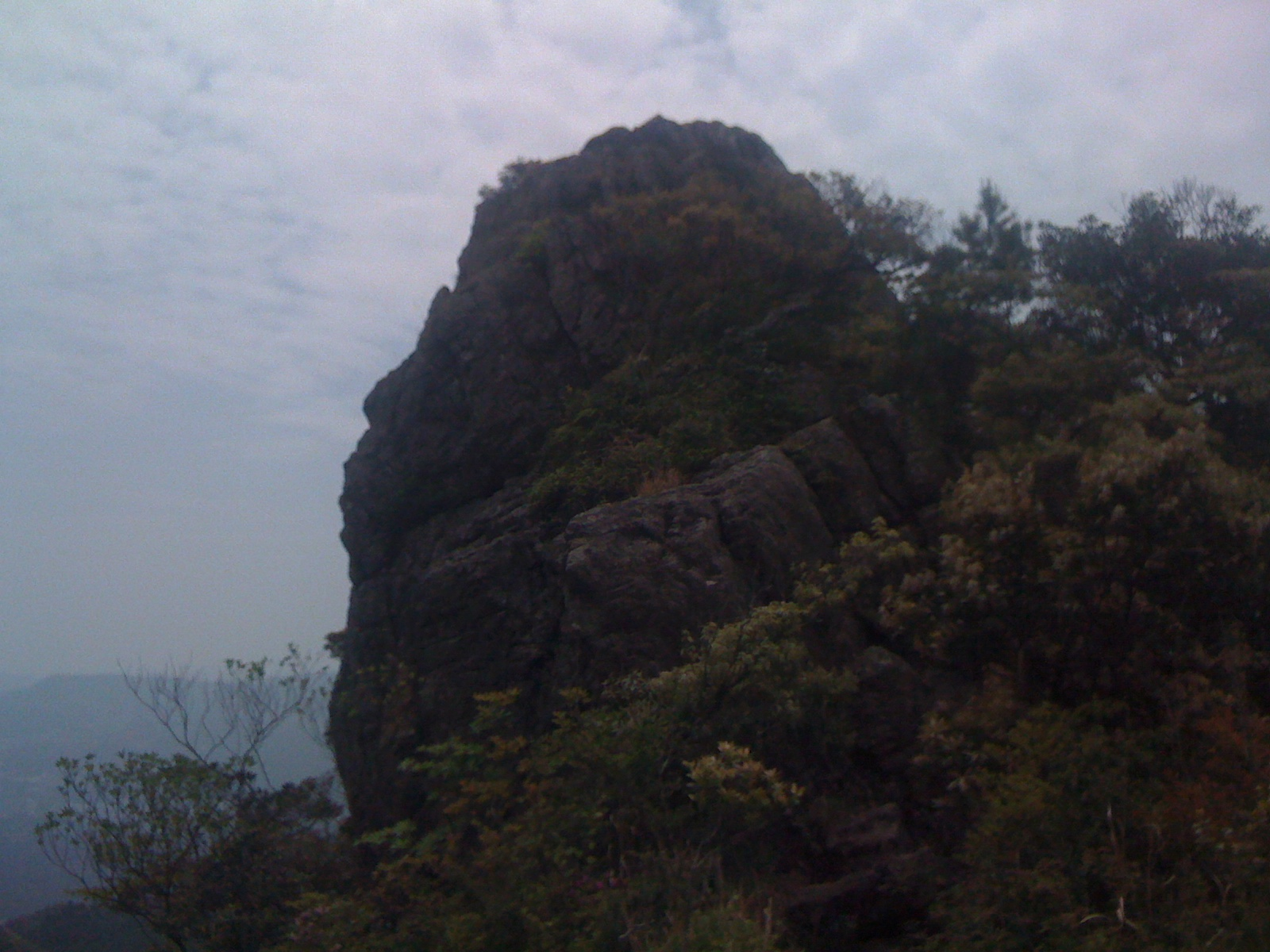
- Mount Kurokami (516 m)
- Interactive map of Kurokamiyama Prefectural Natural Park
- Location: Saga Prefecture, Japan
- Area: 16.84 km^{2} (6.50 sq mi)
- Established: 5 July 1937

Kurokamiyama Prefectural Natural Park (黒髪山県立自然公園, Kurokamiyama kenritsu shizen kōen) is a Prefectural Natural Park in western Saga Prefecture, Japan. First designated for protection in 1937, the park spans the municipalities of Arita, Imari, and Takeo.

== See also ==
- National Parks of Japan
