= Kawakami-Kinryū Prefectural Natural Park =

Prefectural Natural Park in Saga, Japan

- 川上・金立県立自然公園
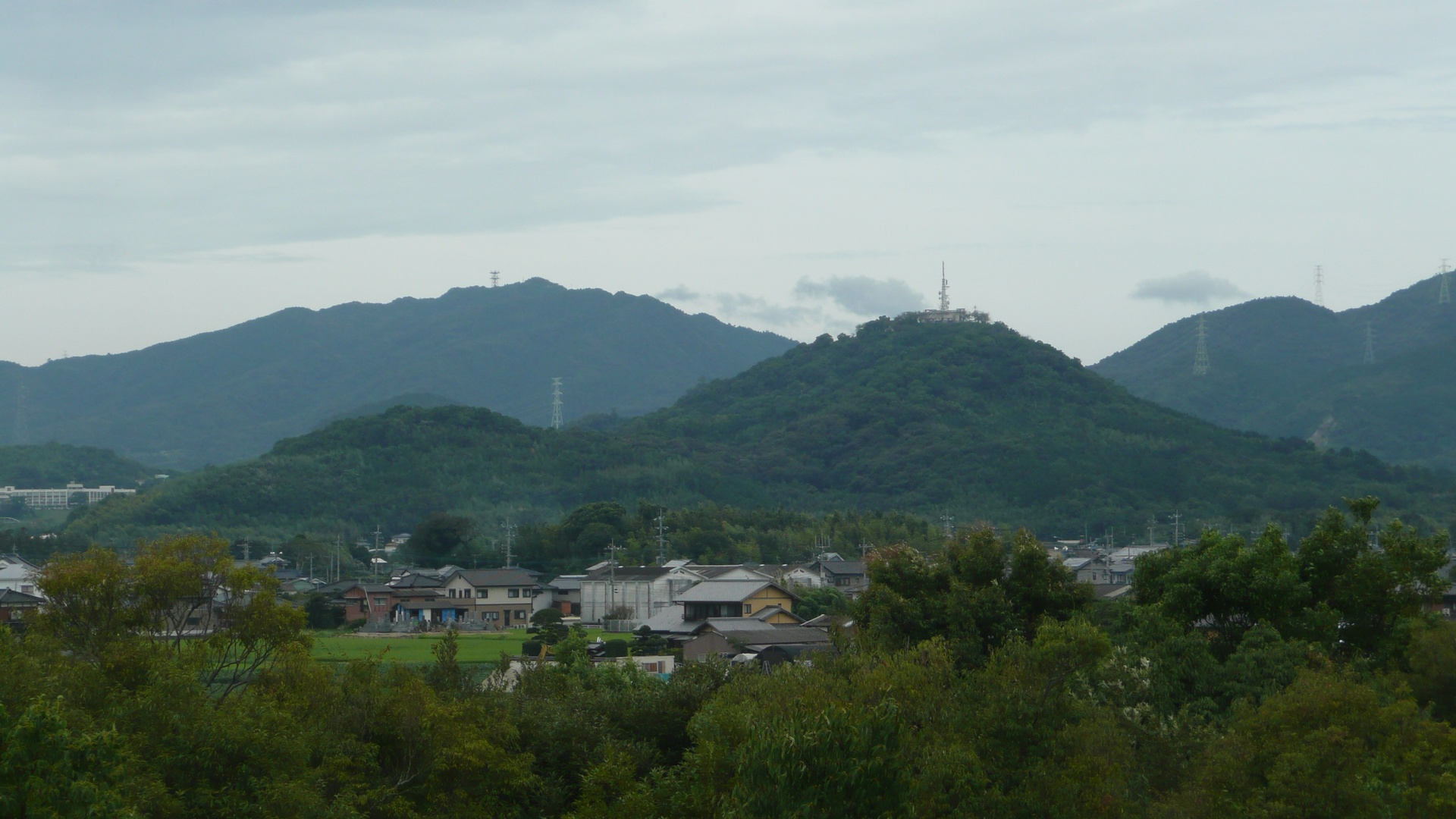
- Mount Hinokuma

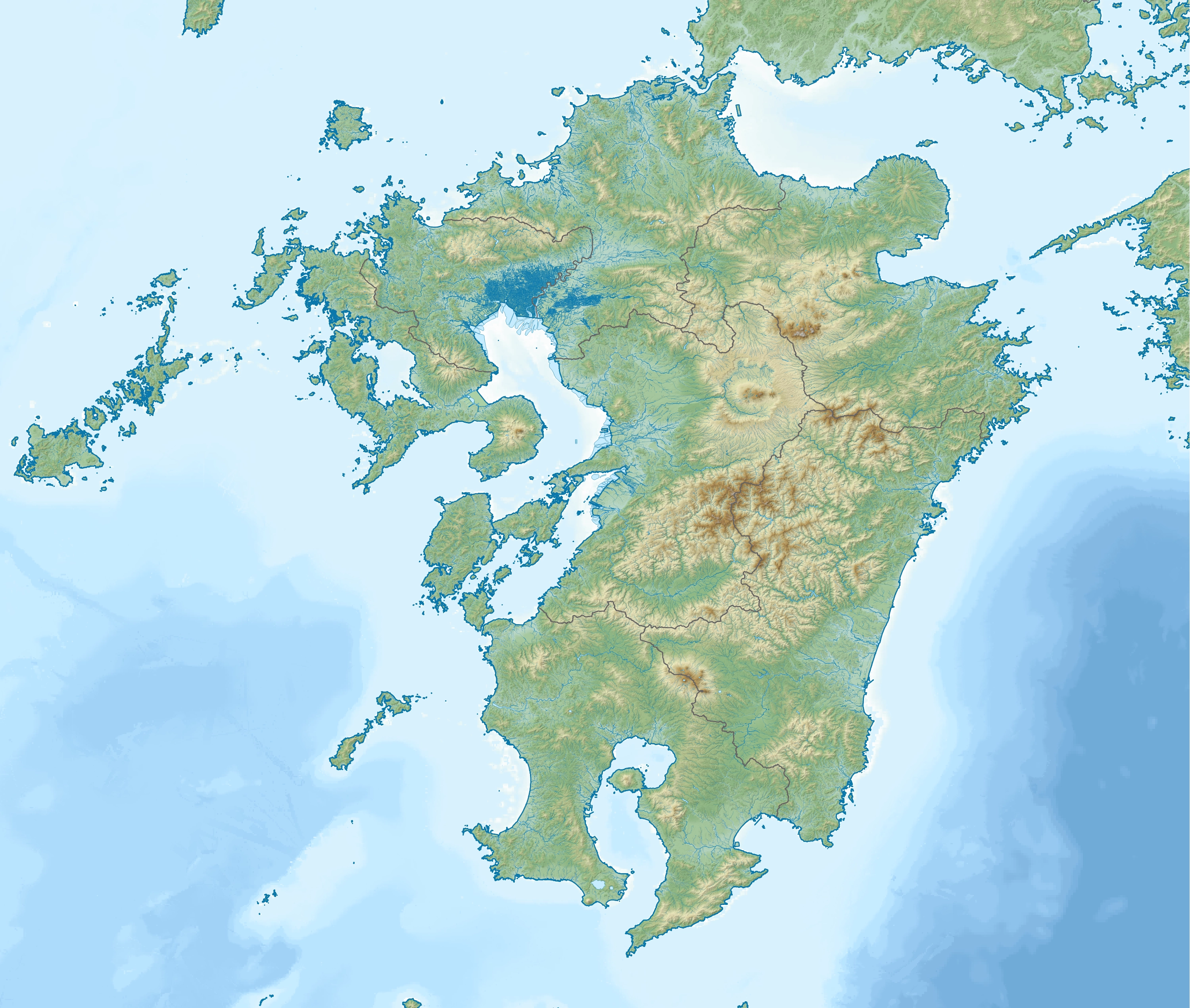
- Location within Saga Prefecture Location within Kyushu Location within Japan
- Location: Saga Prefecture, Japan
- Coordinates: 33.33°N 130.28°E
- Area: 30.21 km^{2} (11.66 sq mi)
- Established: 12 December 1975

Kawakami-Kinryū Prefectural Natural Park (川上・金立県立自然公園, Kawakami-Kinryū kenritsu shizen kōen) is a Prefectural Natural Park in eastern Saga Prefecture, Japan. Established in 1975, the park spans the municipalities of Kanzaki and Saga.

== See also ==
- National Parks of Japan
