= Okumura Ioko =

Japanese activist (1845–1907)

- 奥村五百子
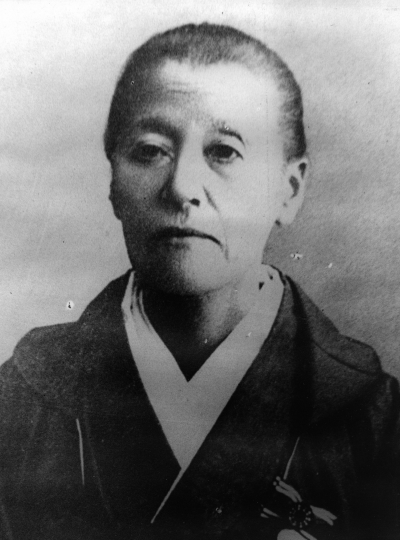
- Born: 7 June 1845; Saga Prefecture, Japan
- Died: 7 February 1907 (aged 61)
- Known for: Founding Aikoku Fujinkai (Patriotic Women's Association)
- Movement: Sonnō jōi
- Awards: Order of the Precious Crown, Sixth Class

Okumura Ioko (Japanese: 奥村五百子, 7 June 1845 – 7 February 1907) was a Japanese activist during the Meiji period. She founded the Aikoku Fujinkai (Patriotic Women's Association) in 1901.

== Biography ==
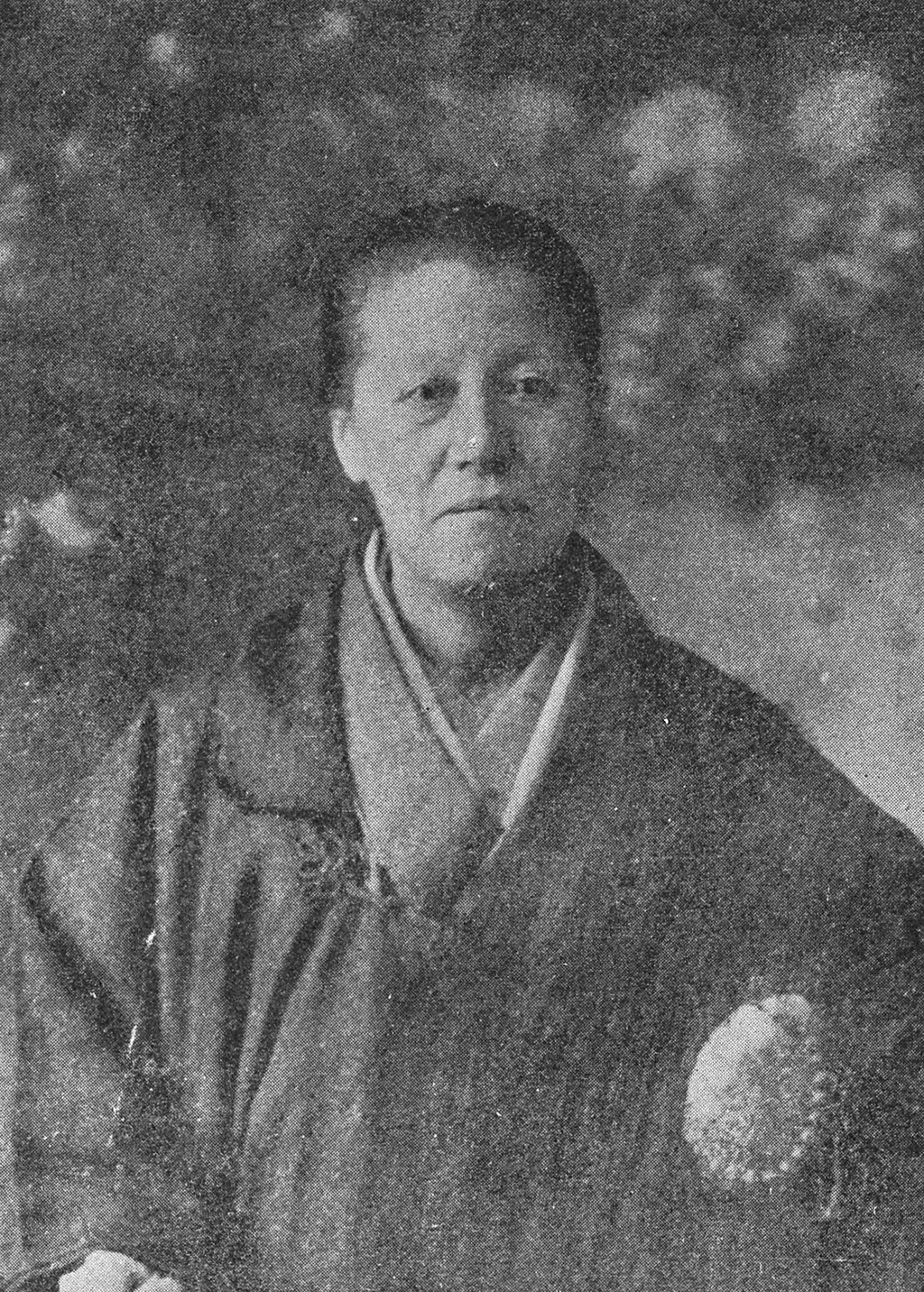
Okumura from a 1914 publication, after her death

Okumura was born on 7 June 1845 in Saga Prefecture, Japan, to an elite family. Okumura married, but lost her first husband, and remarried to a masterless samurai who was formerly under the Mito Clan. They later divorced.

With her father and brother, Okumura was a loyalist to the Imperial Court and joined the Sonnō jōi movement ("revere the Emperor, expel the barbarians"). Okumura moved to Korea, where she opened an industrial school in Kwangju. Alongside her brother, Okumura Ensin Okumura aimed to revive the legacy of their ancestor, Okumura Jōshin, one of the earliest Buddhist missionaries in Korea. She was a supporter of Meiji continental expansion in Asia.

After the Boxer Rebellion broke out in China in 1899, Okumura served as a member of the imperial comfort delegation to Beijing and Tianjin in 1900. She saw exhausted soldiers cleaning their bowls in a river and was motivated to found an organisation to support the serving men. Okumura returned to Japan and founded the Aikoku Fujinkai (Patriotic Women's Association) in 1901, in Tokyo, which organised relief projects to support soldiers and war-bereaved families. The association operated under the Ministry of Internal Affairs, was supported by politician Konoe Atsumaro, and initially was run by the wives and daughters of the nobility.

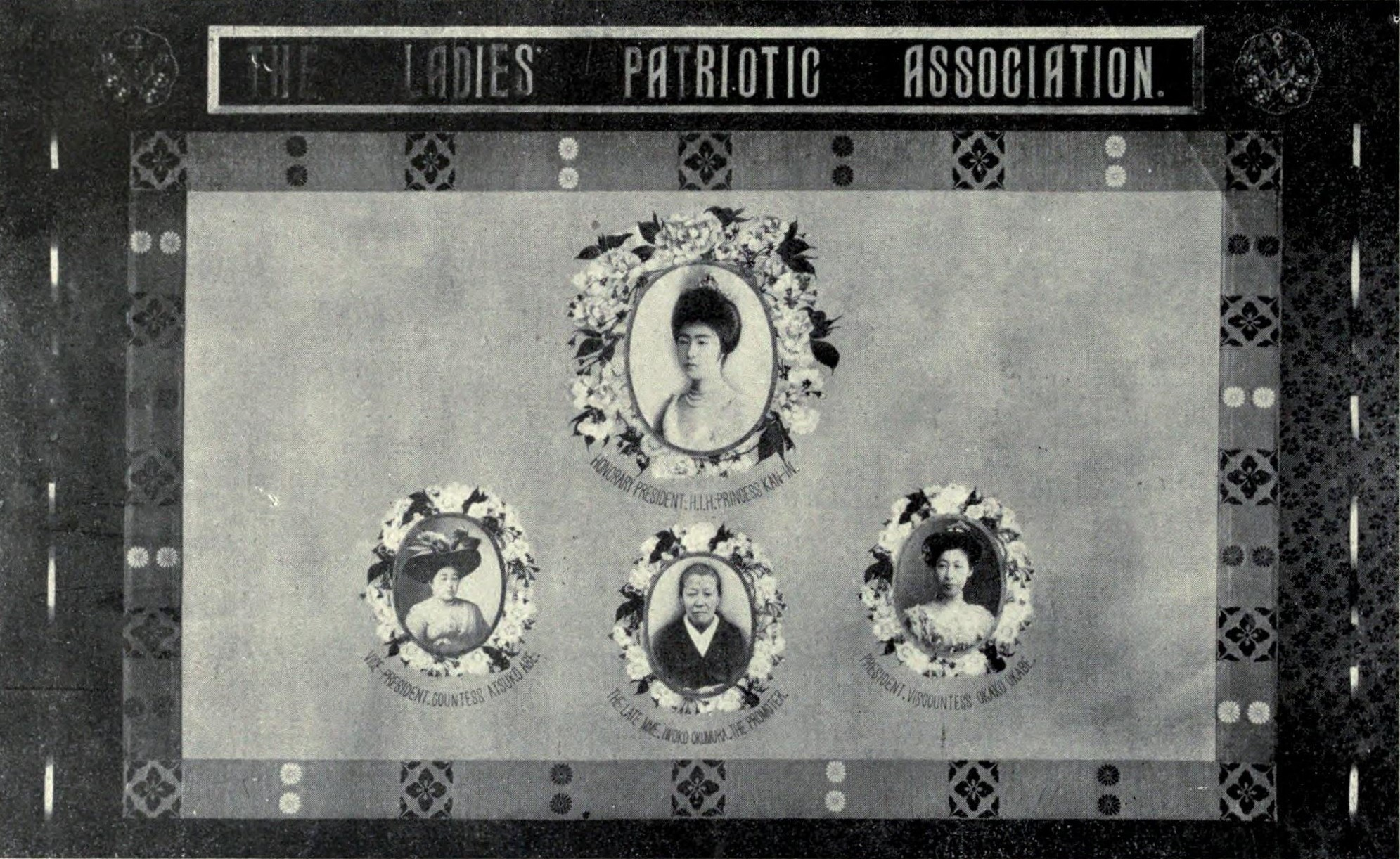
Okumura featured on a Patriotic Ladies Association image, after her death

During Russo-Japanese War (1904–1905), Okumura's association was active in caring for troops. In 1905, Empress Shōken honoured the association by her attendance at a meeting, and Princess Kan-in [ja] was the honorary president of the organisation. By 1919, the association had a million members and branches in villages and towns across the Empire.

Okumura was praised as a "heroine" and "mother of patriotism'" in Japan.

== Awards ==
- Order of the Precious Crown, Sixth Class, awarded posthumously

== Death and legacy ==
Okumura died in 1907.

Okumura was portrayed in Shirō Toyoda's film Okumura Ioko (奥村五百子, 1940).

Okumura is also commemorated by a bronze statue in Karatsu, Saga Prefecture, Japan. A statue of her was formerly at Gwangju Park Square in South Korea.
