= Taradake Prefectural Natural Park (Nagasaki) =

Prefectural Natural Park in Nagasaki Prefecture, Japan

- 多良岳県立自然公園
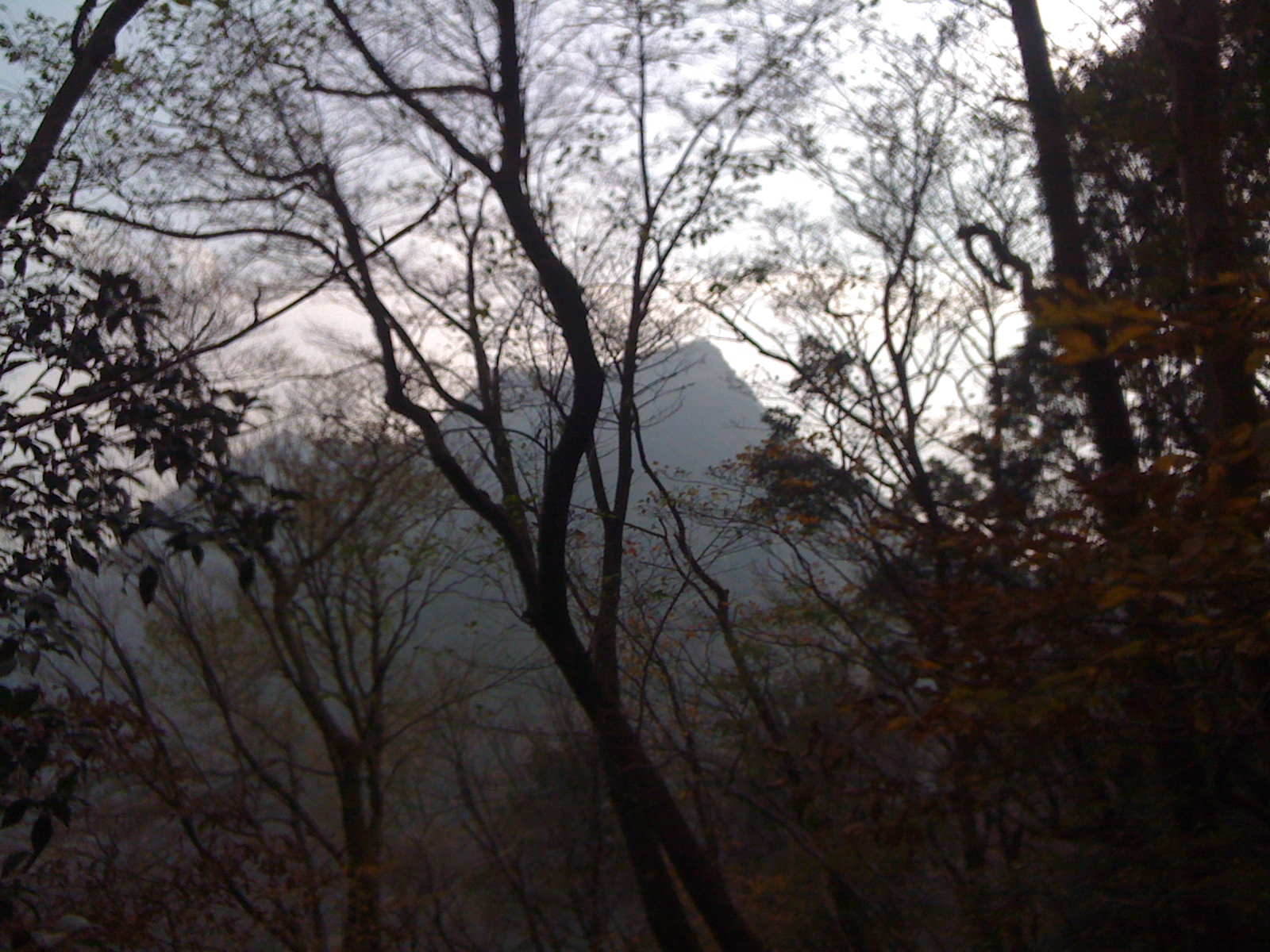
- Mount Tara (983 m)
- Interactive map of Taradake Prefectural Natural Park
- Location: Nagasaki Prefecture, Japan
- Area: 65.43 km^{2} (25.26 sq mi)
- Established: 6 April 1951

Taradake Prefectural Natural Park (多良岳県立自然公園, Taradake kenritsu shizen kōen) is a Prefectural Natural Park in Nagasaki Prefecture, Japan. The park was established in 1951.

== See also ==
- National Parks of Japan
- Taradake Prefectural Natural Park (Saga)
