= Saga Prefecture =

Prefecture of Japan

Saga Prefecture 佐賀県
- Prefecture

Japanese transcription(s)
  - Japanese: 佐賀県
  - Rōmaji: Saga-ken
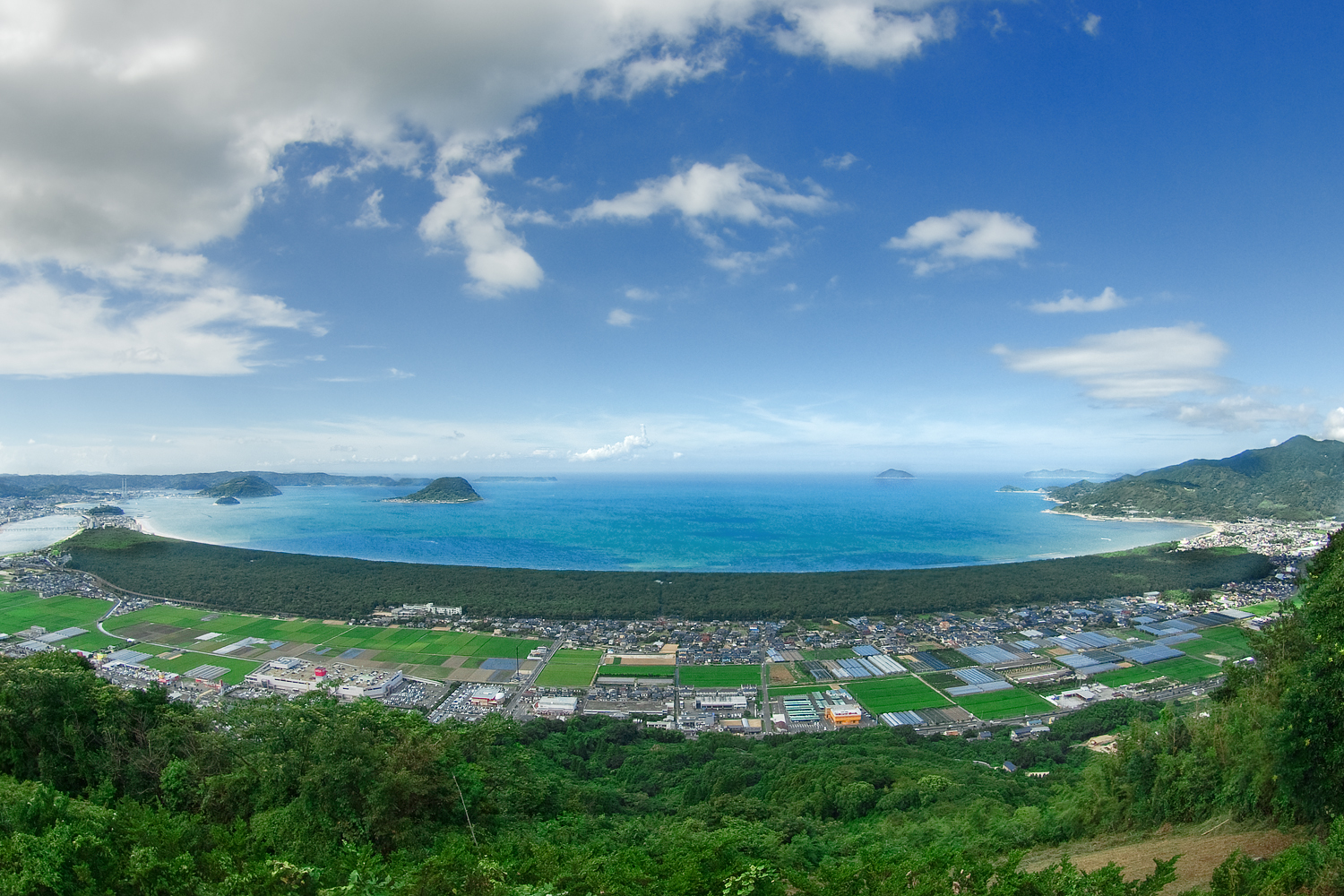
- Nijinomatsubara pine forest and a corner of Karatsu city, Saga

- Flag Seal Emblem
- Anthem: Saga kenmin no uta
- Country: Japan
- Region: Kyushu
- Island: Kyushu
- Capital: Saga
- Subdivisions: Districts: 6, Municipalities: 20

Government
  - Governor: Yoshinori Yamaguchi

Area
  - Total: 2,439 km^{2} (942 sq mi)
  - Rank: 42nd

Population
  - Total: 785,748
  - Density: 322/km^{2} (830/sq mi)

GDP
  - Total: JP¥ 3,149 billion US$ 23.3 billion (2022)
- ISO 3166 code: JP-41
- Website: Saga Prefecture-japanese-english translate
- Symbols of Japan
- Bird: Black-billed magpie (Pica pica)
- Flower: Camphor blossom (Cinnamomum camphora)
- Tree: Camphor tree (Cinnamomum camphora)

Saga Prefecture (佐賀県, Saga-ken; Japanese pronunciation: [sä́.ɡä̀, -ŋä̀, sä̀.ɡä́.kè̞ɴ̀, -ŋä́-]) is a prefecture of Japan located on the island of Kyushu. Saga Prefecture has a population of roughly 780,000 and has a geographic area of 2,439 square kilometres (942 sq mi). Saga Prefecture borders Fukuoka Prefecture to the northeast and Nagasaki Prefecture to the southwest.

Saga is the capital and largest city of Saga Prefecture, with other major cities including Karatsu, Tosu, and Imari. Saga Prefecture is located in the northwest of Kyūshū covering an isthmus-like area extending between the Sea of Japan and the Ariake Sea. Saga Prefecture's western region is known for the production of ceramics and porcelain, particularly in the towns of Karatsu, Imari, and Arita.

== History ==
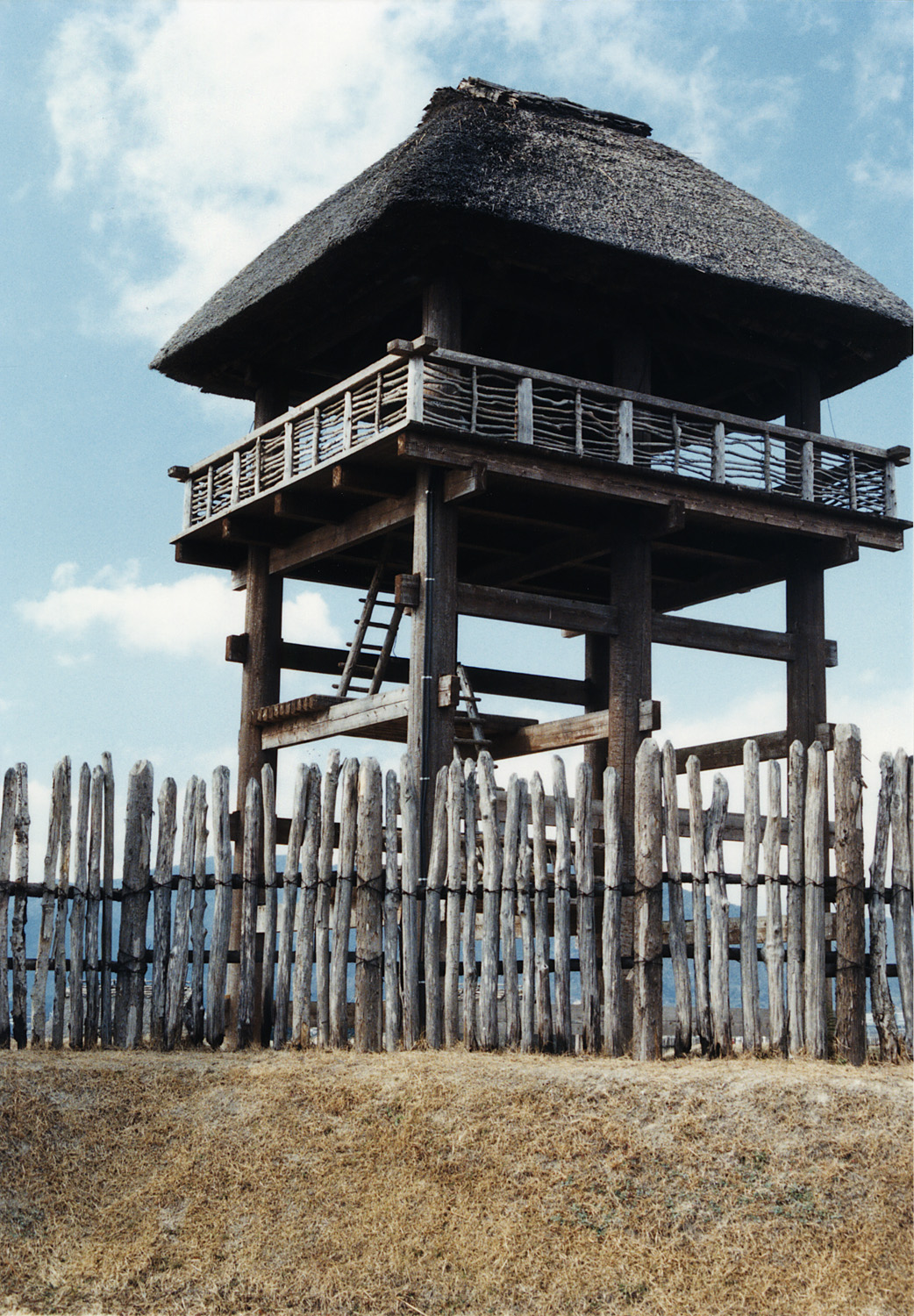
A reconstruction of a Yayoi period building at the Yoshinogari site

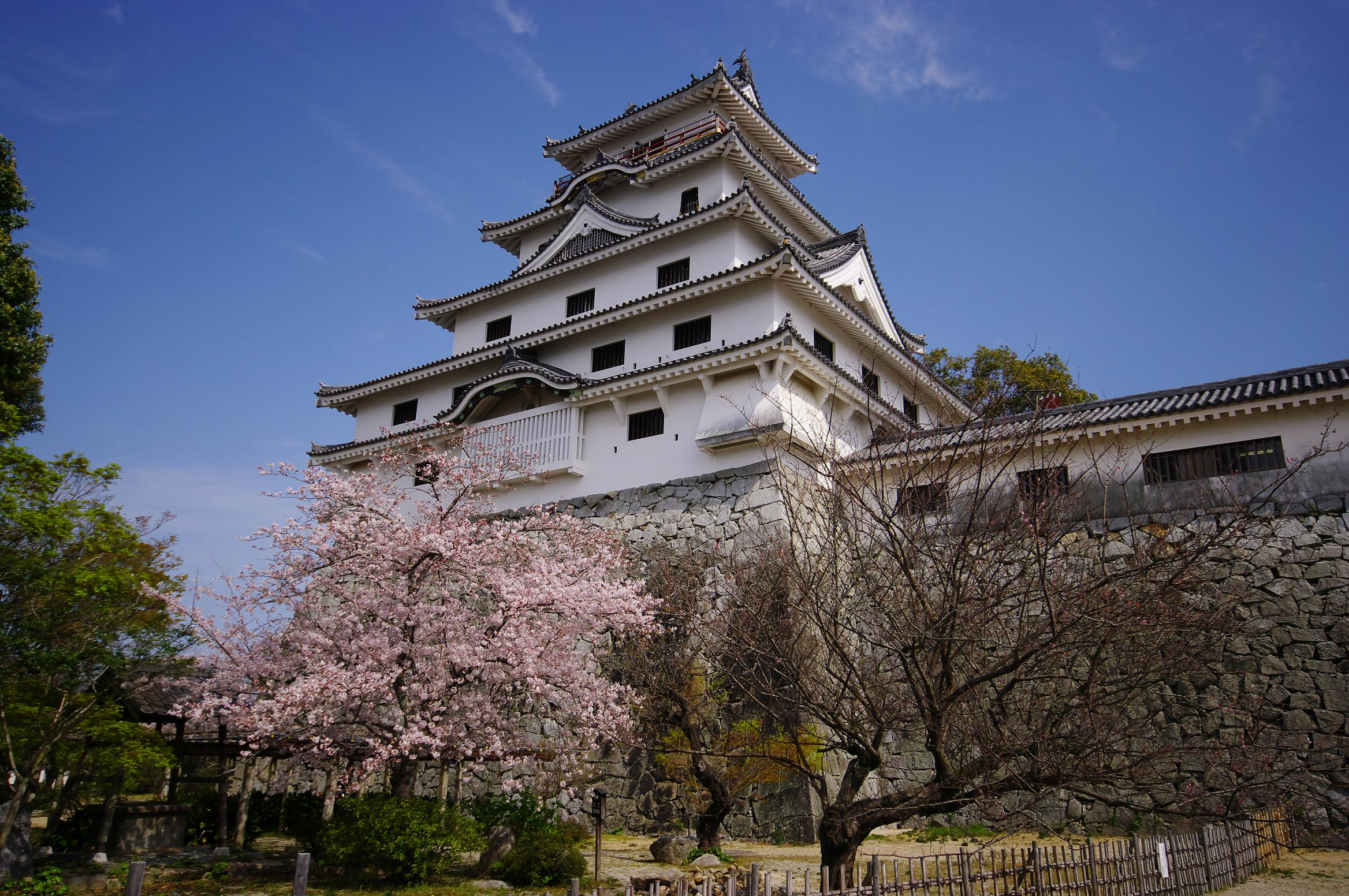
Karatsu Castle

In ancient times, the area composed by Nagasaki Prefecture and Saga Prefecture was called Hizen Province. The current name dates from the Meiji Restoration. Rice farming culture has prospered here since ancient times, and vestiges can be seen at the ruins of Nabatake in Karatsu and the Yoshinogari site in Yoshinogari.

=== Feudal period ===
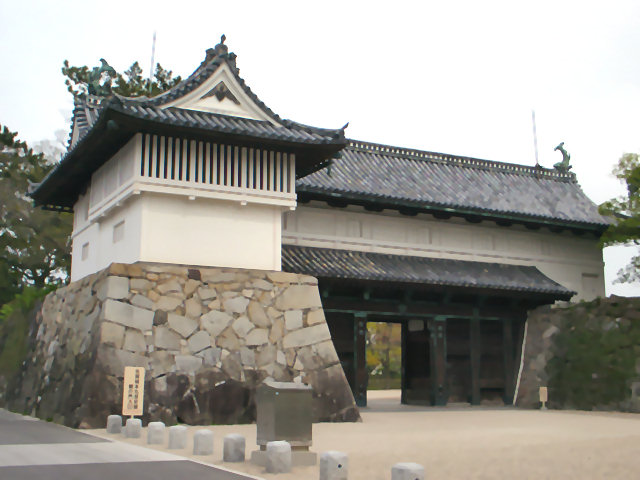
Saga Castle (Shachi gate)

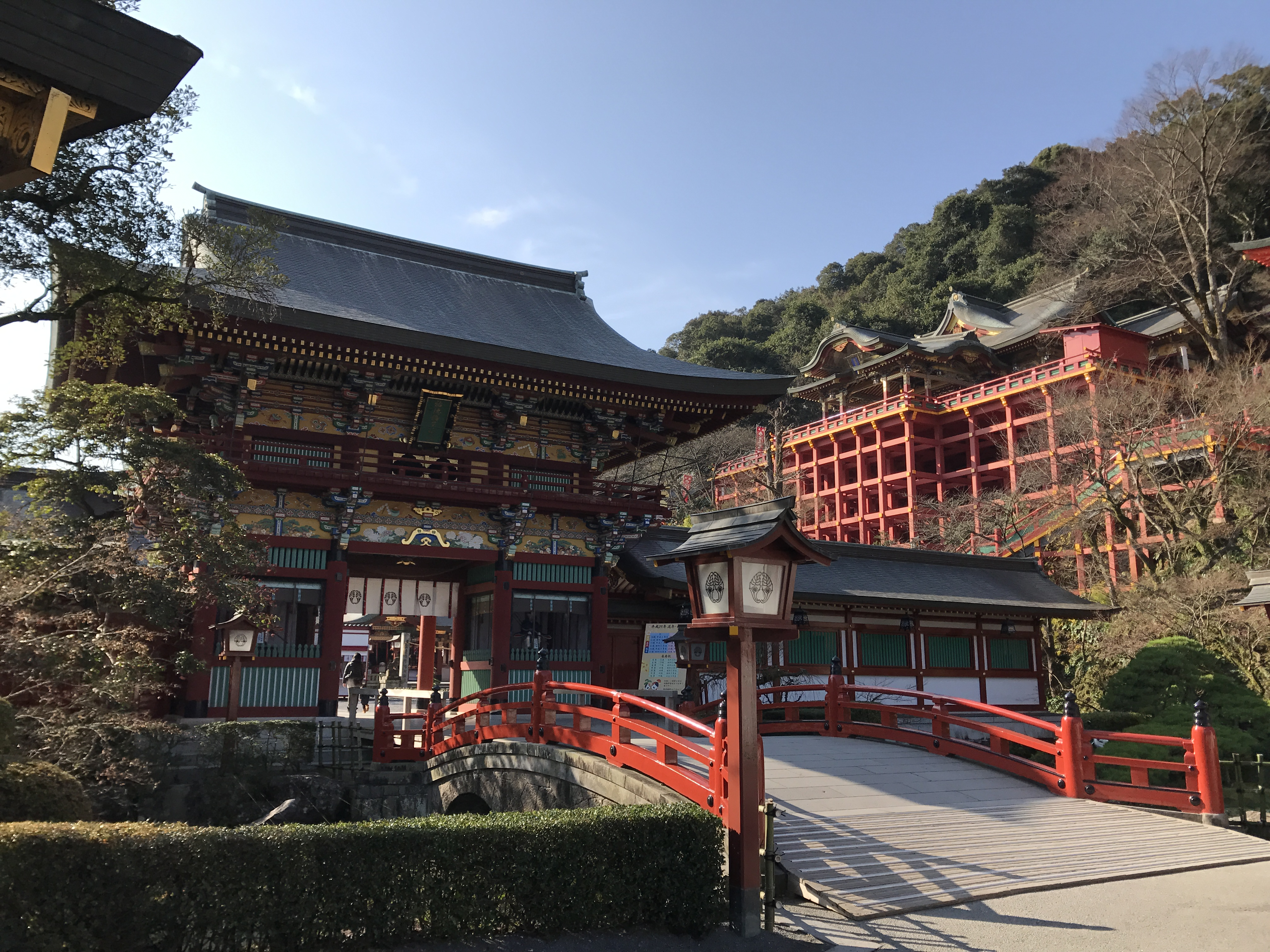
Yūtoku Inari Shrine

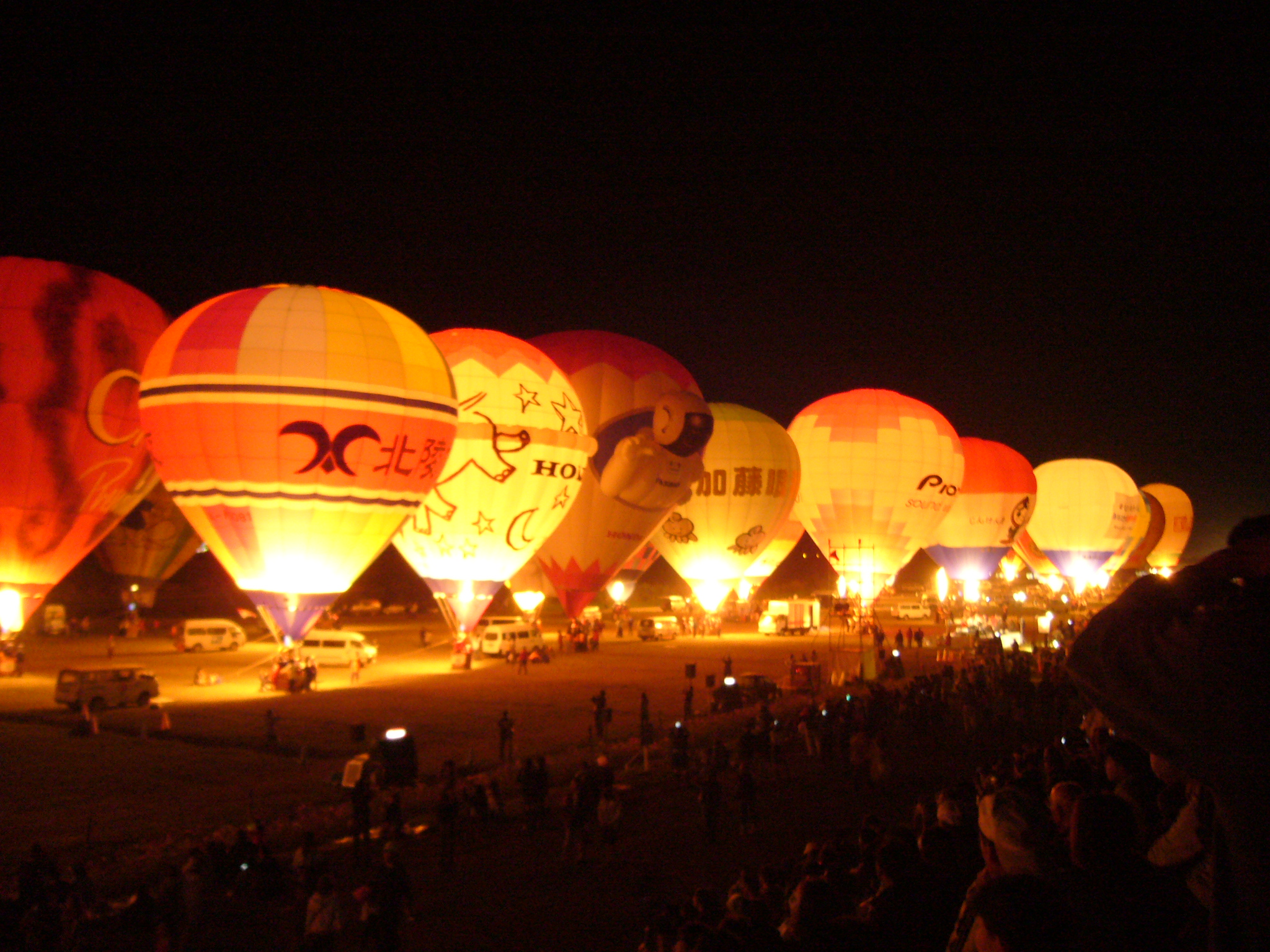
Saga International Balloon Fiesta

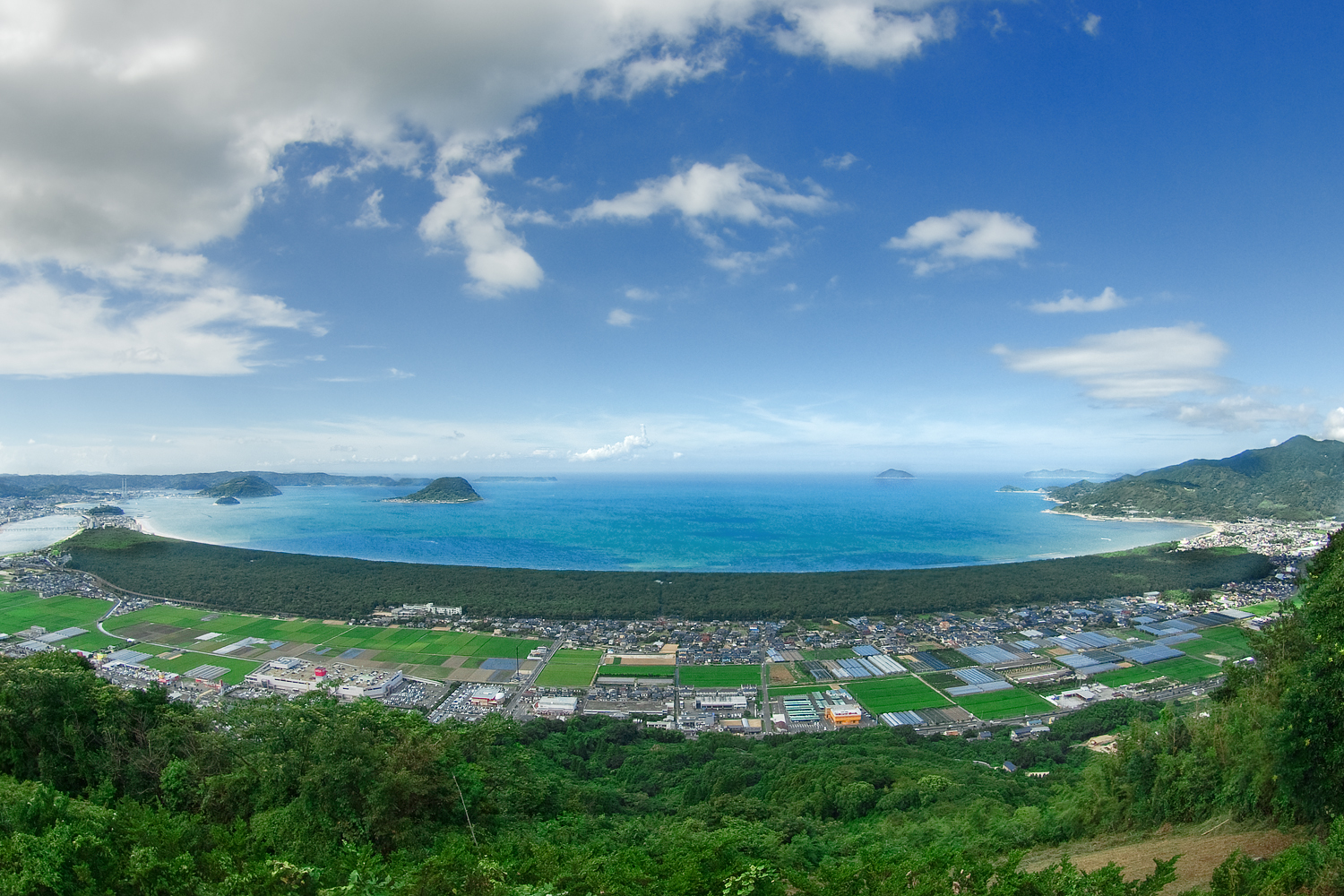
Nijinomatsubara

From the Kamakura period to the Muromachi period, it is thought that over 100 feudal clans existed. Also exerting great influence during this time was a samurai clan operating along the Genkai Sea called the Matsuratō. Upon entering the Sengoku period, the Ryūzōji clan expanded their control to include all of Hizen and Chikugo Provinces, and part of Higo and Chikuzen Provinces. After the death of daimyō Ryūzōji Takanobu, Nabeshima Naoshige took control of the political situation, and by 1607 all of the Ryūzōji clan's domain was under the control of the Nabeshima clan.

In the Edo period this area was called the Saga Domain (佐賀藩 Saga-han), and it included three sub-domains: the Hasunoike, Ogi and Kashima Domains. Also within the current borders of Saga Prefecture during this time were the Karatsu Domain (唐津藩 Karatsu-han) and two territories of the Tsushima-Fuchū Domain (対馬府中藩 Tsushimafuchū-han). Saga Domain and its sub-domains continued to be ruled by the Nabeshima clan, its various illegitimate family lineages and members of the former Ryūzōji clan, and politically the area was relatively stable. The cost of defending Nagasaki was increasing and, difficult from the start, the financial situation was worsened by the great Kyōhō famine and the Siebold Typhoon of 1828. Due to the large area of reclaimed land from the Ariake Sea, arable land was increased significantly and by the 1840s the annual koku of Saga Domain increased to about 670,000, twice that of 200 years before.

Around the middle of the 19th century, Naomasa Nabeshima strove to set right the domain's financial affairs, reduce the number of government officials, and encourage local industry such as Arita porcelain, green tea, and coal. Also, thanks to the proximity of the international port of Nagasaki, new technologies were introduced from overseas, such as the reverberatory furnace and models of steam locomotives.

After the Boshin War, many people from Saga Domain assisted in the Meiji Restoration. In the Meiji era the modernization of coal mines in Kishima and Higashimatsuura districts, among others, progressed bolstered by the construction of railroads.

=== Timeline ===
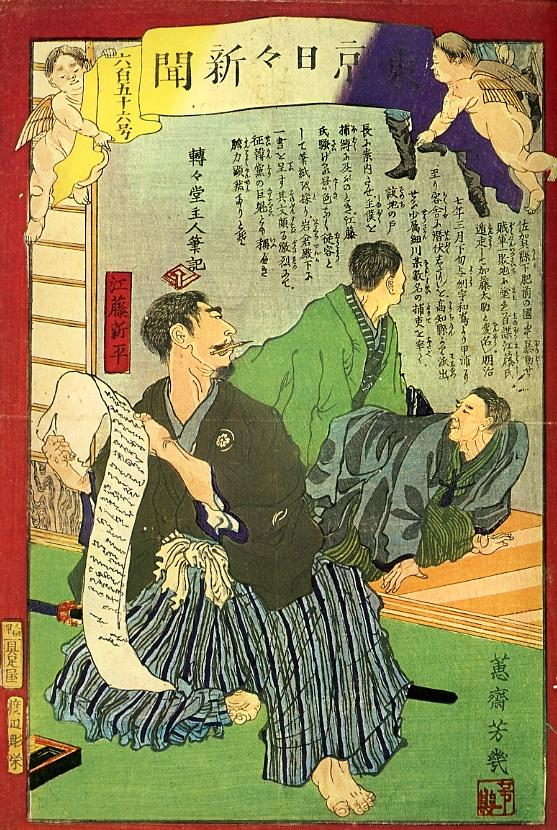
Eto Shimpei in Saga. Woodblock print from Tokyo Nichinichi Shimbun, 1874.

- 6th century BC (end of the Jōmon period): Estimated date of the Nabatake ruins in Karatsu
- 1st century BC (middle of the Yayoi period): Villages flourished at what is now the Yoshinogari site
- 665: After losing the Battle of Baekgang, Kii Castle (in present-day Kiyama) amassed its defenses to protect Dazaifu.
- 733: Hizen Fudoki created.
- 1274: Battle of Bun'ei, the first invasion in the Mongol invasions of Japan
- 1281: Battle of Kōan, the second invasion in the Mongol invasions of Japan
- 1591: Construction of Nagoya Castle. After the Japanese invasions of Korea the castle fell in 1598.
- 1602: Construction of Karatsu Castle and Saga Castle.
- 1607: Control of Saga Domain moved from the Ryūzōji clan to the Nabeshima clan.
- 1771: Nijinomatsubara Uprising
- 1781: Establishment of Kōdōkan, the Saga Han school.
- 1828: Heavy damage from the Siebold typhoon, deaths estimated at over 10,000.
- 1871, July 14: Abolition of the han system. All of the han became prefectures.
- 1871, November 14: The prefectures of Saga, Hasuike, Ogi, Kashima, Karatsu and part of Tsushima merged to form one prefecture, Imari Prefecture.
- 1872, May 29: Imari Prefecture renamed Saga Prefecture.
- 1874, February: Saga Rebellion.
- 1876, April 18: Incorporated into Mizuma Prefecture.
- 1876, May and June: Parts of Mizuma Prefecture transferred to Nagasaki Prefecture.
- 1876, August 21: Mizuma Prefecture abolished. Remaining parts incorporated into Nagasaki Prefecture.
- 1883: Saga Prefecture re-established as an independent prefecture, separated from Nagasaki Prefecture.
- 1889, April 1: The city of Saga is founded.
- 1891: The Kyushu Railroad Nagasaki Line opens, beginning with a section from Tosu to Saga.
- 1895: Opening of railroad from Saga to Takeo.
- 1897: Opening of railroad from Takeo to Haiki.
- 1903: Opening of railroad from Saga to Nishi-Karatsu.
- 1932, January 1: The city of Karatsu is founded.
- 1935: The Japanese National Railways Saga Line opens.
- 1954: During the Great Showa Merger the cities of Tosu, Imari, Takeo, Kashima and Taku are formed. At this point there are 7 cities, 8 districts, 18 towns and 35 villages in Saga Prefecture.
- 1972: With the closing of the Nishiki coal mine, all coal mines in Saga are closed.
- 1975: The Genkai Nuclear Power Plant begins operation.
- 1987: The Japanese National Railways Saga Line closes.
- 1992: The Yoshinogari History Park opens to the public.
- 1998: The Saga Airport opens in Kawasoe, in what is now the city of Saga.
- 2005: As a part of the Great Heisei Merger various municipalities are reorganized.
  - January 1: Karatsu and Shiroishi.
  - March 1: Ogi and Miyaki.
  - October 1: Saga.
- 2006: The Great Heisei Merger continues.
  - January 1: Karatsu and Ureshino.
  - March 1: Takeo, Yoshinogari, and Arita.
  - March 20: Kanzaki.
- 2007, October 1: The towns of Higashiyoka, Kawasoe and Kubota merge with the city of Saga.
- 2011, March 12: The Kyushu Shinkansen opens.

== Geography ==
Kyushu's prefecture, Saga, is located on the northwest corner of the island, bordered by the Genkai Sea and the Tsushima Strait to the north and the Ariake Sea to the south. Saga's proximity to mainland Asia has made it an important gateway for the transmission of culture and trade throughout Japanese history. Largely rural outside of the two largest cities of Saga and Karatsu, agricultural and forested lands comprise over 68% of the total prefectural land area. There are six prefectural parks and one quasi-national park in Saga.

- Northernmost point: Enuonohana, Kakarajima, Karatsu – 33°36′N 129°51′E
- Easternmost point: Iida-machi, Tosu – 33°23′N 130°32′E
- Southernmost point: Ōurakō, Tara – 32°57′N 130°13′E
- Westernmost point: Ōse, Madarashima, Karatsu – 33°34′N 129°44′E

=== Geographical features ===
==== Plains ====
- Saga Plains

==== Mountains ====
- Sefuri Mountains, Tara Mountains
- Mount Kyōga (1,076 m, the highest point in Saga), Mount Sefuri (1,056 m), Tenzan (1,046 m), Taradake (996 m), Mount Ihara (962 m), Kinzan (957 m), Raizan (955 m), Mount Hagane (900 m)

==== Rivers and lakes ====
- Chikugo River (15.5 km in Saga), Kase River (57.5 km), Matsuura River (45.3 km), Rokkaku River (43.6 km)
- Hokuzan Dam, Kase River Dam

==== Seas ====
- East China Sea: Ariake Sea, Isahaya Bay
- Sea of Japan: Genkai Sea, Karatsu Bay, Imari Bay,

==== Peninsulas ====
- Higashimatsuura Peninsula, part of Kitamatsuura Peninsula

==== Islands ====
- Genkai Sea: Takashima, Kashiwajima, Ogawajima, Kakarajima, Matsushima, Madarajima, Kabeshima, Mukushima, Iroha Islands
- Ariake Sea: Okinoshima

==== Forests ====
- Niji-no-Matsubara

==== Caves ====
- Nanatsugama Caves

=== Land use ===
Total area: 2439.31 km^{2}

- Forest, rough lands: 49.2% – 1/3 of the national average.
  - Forested area: 1096.9 km^{2} – From 2000, 42nd in the country.
- Arable land: 39.1% – 2 times the national average.
- Residential: 6.8% – 1.4 times the national average.
- Other: 4.9% – Roughly the same as the national average.

As of March 31, 2008, 11% of the total land area of the prefecture was designated as Natural Parks, namely the Genkai Quasi-National Park and Hachimandake, Kawakami-Kinryū, Kurokamiyama, Sefuri-Kitayama, Taradake, and Tenzan Prefectural Natural Parks.

=== Climate ===
Saga Prefecture has a mild climate with an average temperature of about 16 °C (61 °F).

== Municipalities ==
Map of Saga Prefecture showing municipal boundaries: City Town

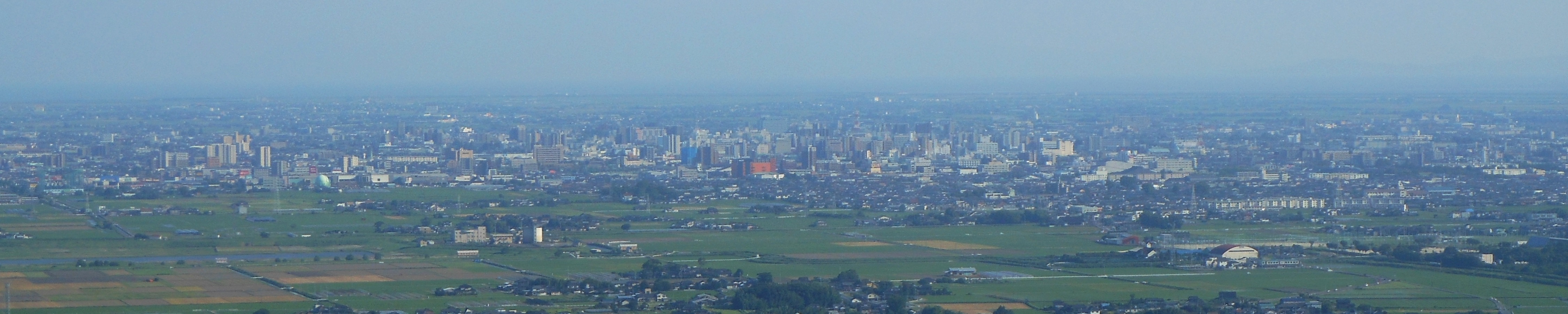
Saga City

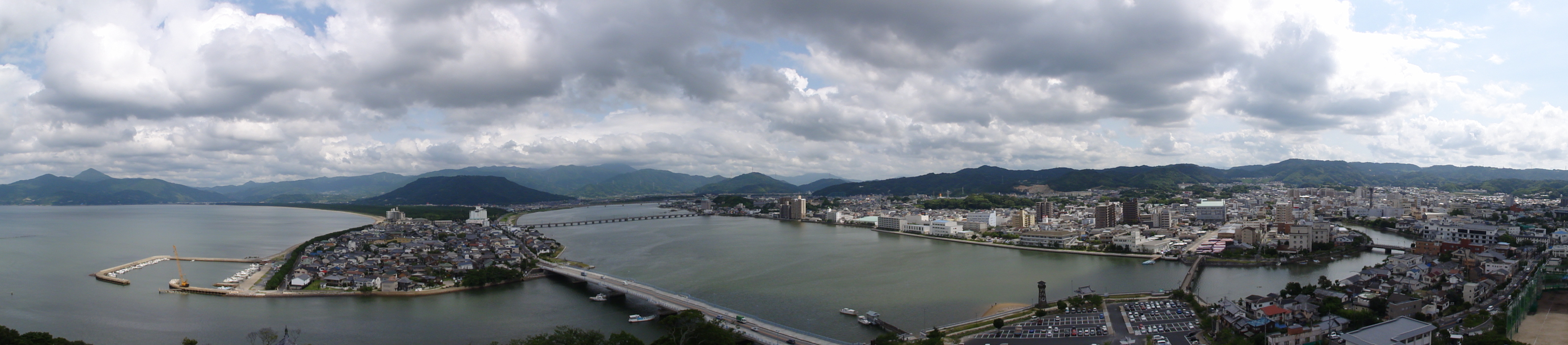
Karatsu

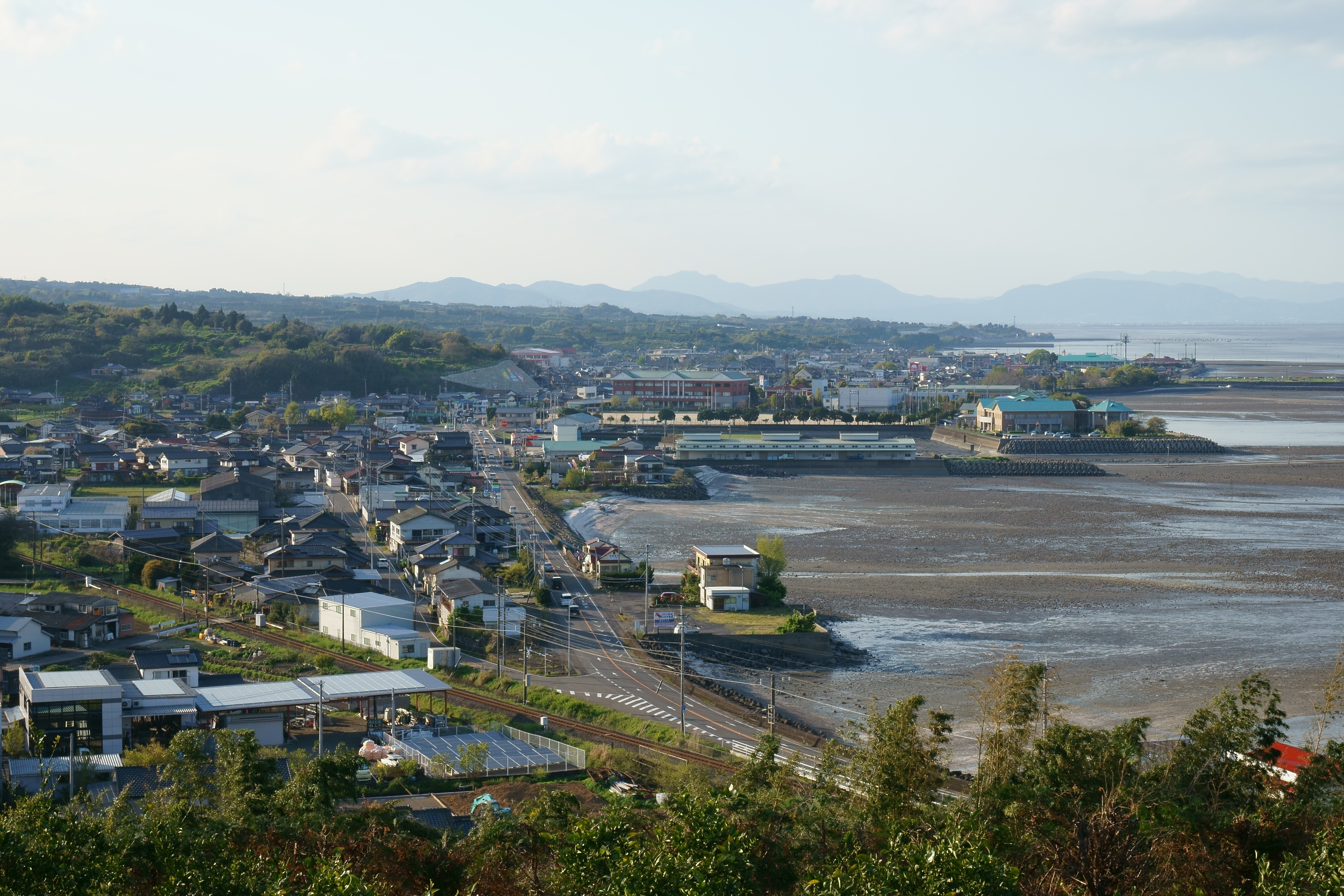
Tara Town

As of October 1, 2007, there are 10 cities, six districts, and 10 towns in Saga Prefecture, a total of 20 municipalities. As a part of the Great Heisei Merger, the number of municipalities has decreased since January 1, 2005. On March 20, 2006, the village of Sefuri merged with the city of Kanzaki, leaving Saga with no more villages.

=== Cities ===
Ten cities are located in Saga Prefecture:

| Name | | Area (km^{2}) | Population | Map |
| Rōmaji | Kanji | Area (km^{2}) | Population | Map |
|---|---|---|---|---|
| Imari | 伊万里市 | 254.99 | 54,907 | |
| Kanzaki | 神埼市 | 125.01 | 31,981 | |
| Karatsu | 唐津市 | 487.59 | 117,663 | |
| Kashima | 鹿島市 | 112.1 | 30,159 | |
| Ogi | 小城市 | 95.85 | 45,638 | |
| Saga (capital) | 佐賀市 | 431.84 | 232,736 | |
| Takeo | 武雄市 | 195.44 | 48,845 | |
| Taku | 多久市 | 96.93 | 19,202 | |
| Tosu | 鳥栖市 | 71.73 | 72,755 | |
| Ureshino | 嬉野市 | 126.51 | 26,937 | |

=== Towns ===
These are the towns in each district:

| Name | | Area (km^{2}) | Population | District | Map |
| Rōmaji | Kanji | Area (km^{2}) | Population | District | Map |
|---|---|---|---|---|---|
| Arita | 有田町 | 65.85 | 18,989 | Nishimatsuura District | |
| Genkai | 玄海町 | 36 | 5,855 | Higashimatsuura District | |
| Kamimine | 上峰町 | 12.79 | 9,589 | Miyaki District | |
| Kiyama | 基山町 | 22.12 | 17,398 | Miyaki District | |
| Kōhoku | 江北町 | 24.48 | 9,524 | Kishima District | |
| Miyaki | みやき町 | 51.89 | 25,534 | Miyaki District | |
| Ōmachi | 大町町 | 11.46 | 6,680 | Kishima District | |
| Shiroishi | 白石町 | 99.46 | 23,606 | Kishima District | |
| Tara | 太良町 | 74.2 | 9,125 | Fujitsu District | |
| Yoshinogari | 吉野ヶ里町 | 43.94 | 16,117 | Kanzaki District | |

=== Metropolitan areas ===
- Karatsu-Higashimatsuura
  - Karatsu, Genkai
- Kitō
  - Takeo, Kashima, Ureshino, Shiroishi, Ōmachi, Kōhoku, Tara
- Saga
  - Saga, Taku, Ogi, Kanzaki
- Tosu
  - Tosu, Kamimine, Kiyama, Yoshinogari, Miyaki

== Economy ==
Agriculture, forestry, and coastal fisheries form a large portion of the prefectural economy. Regional agricultural specialties include Saga beef, onions, and strawberries. The prefecture is the largest producer of mochigome (sticky rice) and greenhouse mandarin oranges in Japan.

According to 2002 figures, regional trade exports are focused primarily towards North America (29.3%), Western Europe (26.1%), and the Newly Industrializing Economies of South Korea, Taiwan, Hong Kong and Singapore (19.9%). Imports come principally from North America (40.6%), the ASEAN nations (23.3%), and the People's Republic of China (12.2%).

== Demographics ==
Saga prefecture population pyramid in 2020

In 2002, the census recorded a population of 873,885 in Saga. Of these, 15.9% were aged 0–14, 62.7% were aged 15–64, and 21.4% were over 65 years old. There were 3,596 foreigners (0.4%) and 307 exchange students (0.03%) living in the prefecture.

== Education ==
=== Universities ===
- Kyushu Ryukoku Junior College
- Nishikyushu University
- Nishikyushu University Junior College (former Saga Junior College)
- Saga Prefectural Agricultural College
- Saga University
- Saga Women's Junior College

== Transportation ==
=== Air ===
- Saga Airport

=== Rail ===
Major stations in the prefecture include Saga Station, Tosu Station, Karatsu Station and Imari Station. The new Nishi Kyushu Shinkansen line stops at the Takeo-Onsen Station.

- JR Kyushu
  - Chikuhi Line
  - Kagoshima Main Line
  - Karatsu Line
  - Kyushu Shinkansen
  - Nagasaki Main Line
  - Nishi Kyushu Shinkansen
  - Sasebo Line
- Matsuura Railway
  - Nishi-Kyūshū Line
- Amagi Railway
  - Amagi Line

=== Road ===
- National highways
  - Route 34, Route 35
  - Route 202, Route 203, Route 204, Route 207, Route 263, Route 264, Route 323, Route 385, Route 444, Route 498
- Tollways
  - Nagasaki Expressway, Kyushu Expressway, Nishi-Kyūshū Expressway
  - Nijō-Hamatama Road, Kyūragi-Taku Road, Mitsuse Tunnel

== Culture ==
Arita, Imari and Karatsu are famous for the porcelain that is created there. The top porcelain houses in the country are located in these areas, including Imaemon Porcelain, Genemon Porcelain and Fukagawa Porcelain.

== Language ==
Saga-ben (Saga dialect) is Saga's own variation of Japanese.

== Festivals ==
=== Balloon Fiesta ===
The Saga International Balloon Fiesta is held at the beginning of November every year just outside Saga City along the Kase River. This is a popular event and attracts competitors from all over the world.

=== Karatsu Kunchi ===
The Karatsu Kunchi is held at the beginning of November in Karatsu City. This is Saga's largest festival and attracts around 500,000 visitors every year.

=== Kashima Gatalympics ===
The Kashima Gatalympics are held every May–June in the city of Kashima. This event involves playing a variety of sports in the mudflats of the Ariake Sea. The Gatalympics are not held if the weather is raining.

=== Imari Ton-Ten-Ton Festival ===
The Imari Ton-Ten-Ton Festival is held for 3 days every year near the end of October. Located in Imari City, the festival is one of the three great fighting festivals in Japan. In the festival a crashing battle takes place between the two huge portable shrines, the Ara-mikoshi and the Danjiri. The name "Ton-Ten-Ton" represents the sound of drums used in the festival.

== Sports ==
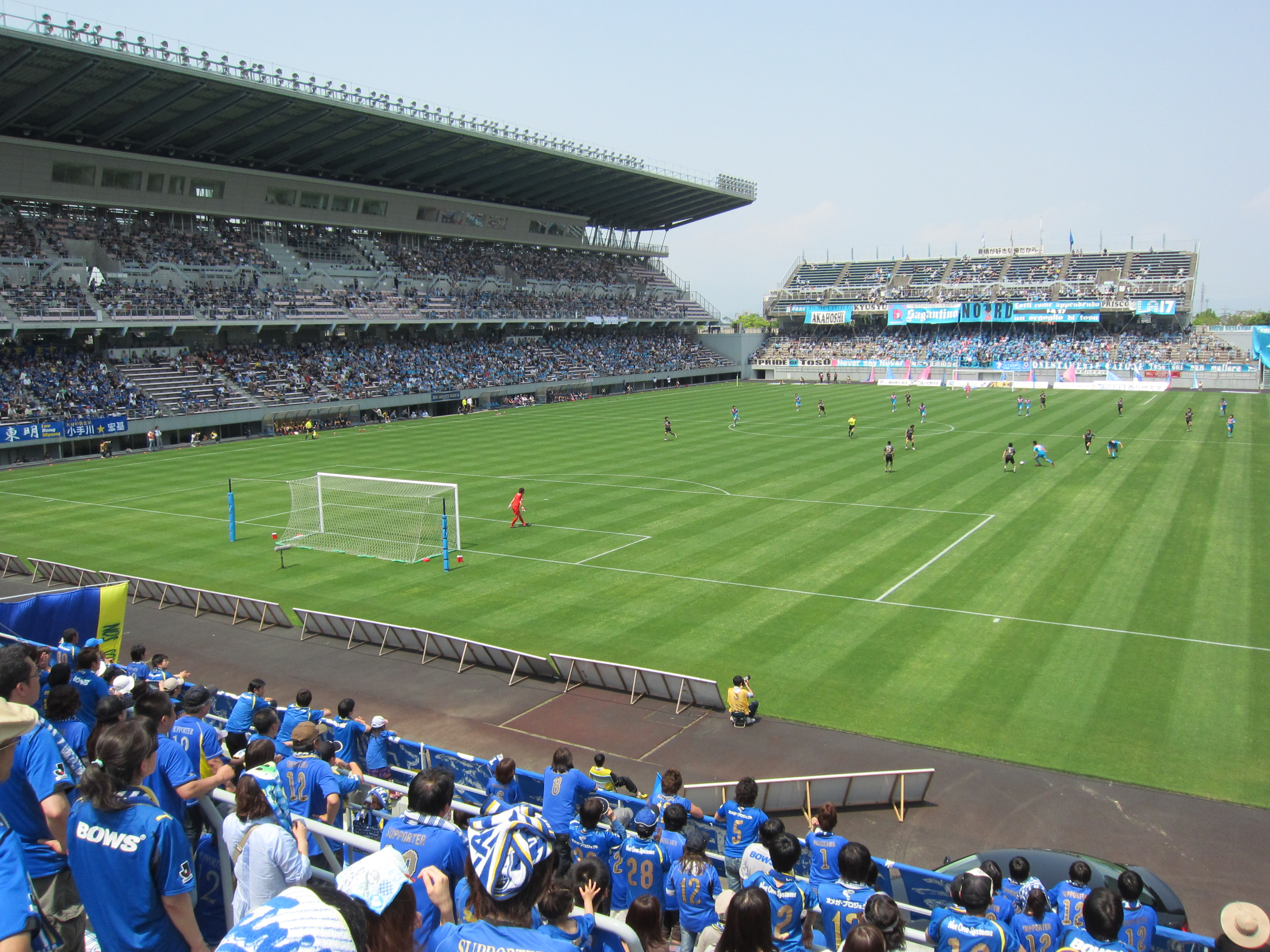
Ekimae Real Estate Stadium in Tosu

=== Sports teams ===
Teams listed below are based in Saga Prefecture.

Football (soccer)

- Sagan Tosu (Tosu)

Volleyball

- Hisamitsu Springs (Tosu)

Basketball

- Saga Ballooners (Saga)

Baseball

- Saga Indonesia Dreams (Takeo)

== Tourism ==
Karatsu, with its fine castle, is a tourist destination in Saga. The remains of a Yayoi village in Yoshinogari also attract large numbers of sightseers. Another place to visit is Yūtoku Inari Shrine, one of Japan's three biggest Inari shrines.

The Saga prefecture helped sponsor the 2018 anime Zombie Land Saga, which has attracted tourists to various locations showcased in the series, including the museum that doubles in the series as the girls' house and Drive-In Tori Chicken.

== Notable people ==
- Comedian and J-pop singer Hanawa became famous for comically singing about Saga Prefecture and its oddities.
- Former TV personality Masashi Tashiro was born in Saga Prefecture.
- Meiji period activist Okumura Ioko was born in Saga Prefecture.
- World War II fighter ace Saburō Sakai was born in Saga Prefecture.
- Actress and J-pop singer Yasuko Matsuyuki and her younger brother, J-pop/rock singer Yuna Katsuki (of Lazy Knack and Red), are from Saga city.

=== The Seven Wise Men of Saga ===
"The Seven Wise Men of Saga" is the name given to these seven men from Saga, each of whom have made a significant contribution to the modernisation of Japan. Their contributions began in the last days of the Tokugawa shogunate, and continued into the Meiji Restoration. Even today, this era shines impressively in Saga's history.

- Lord Naomasa Nabeshima, feudal lord of the Nabeshima clan, helped to bring about the development of Saga through introducing European technology and culture.
- Etō Shinpei, also once a Minister of Legal Affairs, became a Diet member and created the foundation for Japan's judicial system.
- Ōkuma Shigenobu served two terms as Prime Minister of Japan. He also established Waseda University.
- Ōki Takatō was Minister of Civil Affairs, Education and Legal Affairs, held the position of a Diet member and made considerable contributions to the establishment of the modern education system in Japan.
- Soejima Taneomi served the roles of Diet member, Foreign Minister, Minister of Domestic Affairs and was well known for his Chinese Poetry and talented writing skills.
- Sano Tsunetami founded the Japanese Red Cross.
- Shima Yoshitake contributed to the exploration of Hokkaido.

== See also ==
- Saga Domain
- Saga Rebellion
