= 1828 Siebold typhoon =

Typhoon in Japan

The Siebold typhoon (Japanese: シーボルト台風) was a typhoon that struck Japan (northern Kyushu Island in particular) on September 17, 1828. There were 19,113 confirmed deaths, according to the official report.

== Overview ==
According to the official report, the typhoon's estimated central pressure was 935hPa, with a maximum wind speed of 198 kilometres (123 mi). A storm surge occurred in the Ariake Sea and in Hakata Bay. The official death toll was 19,113, and 18,625 were injured. The heaviest damage occurred at Saga, Omura, Yanagawa, and Fukuoka. This is the worst storm in Japanese history.

It was discovered that a map of Japan was taken out of the country when the ship that Philipp Franz von Siebold was aboard ran aground due to this typhoon. The map was discovered when the contents of the cargo were examined while the ship was being repaired. This discovery led to the Siebold incident (Japanese: シーボルト事件). Therefore, this typhoon was named the "Siebold typhoon".

== See also ==
- Siebold incident (シーボルト事件)
