= Nijinomatsubara =

Pine forest in Karatsu, Japan

Nijinomatsubara 虹之松原
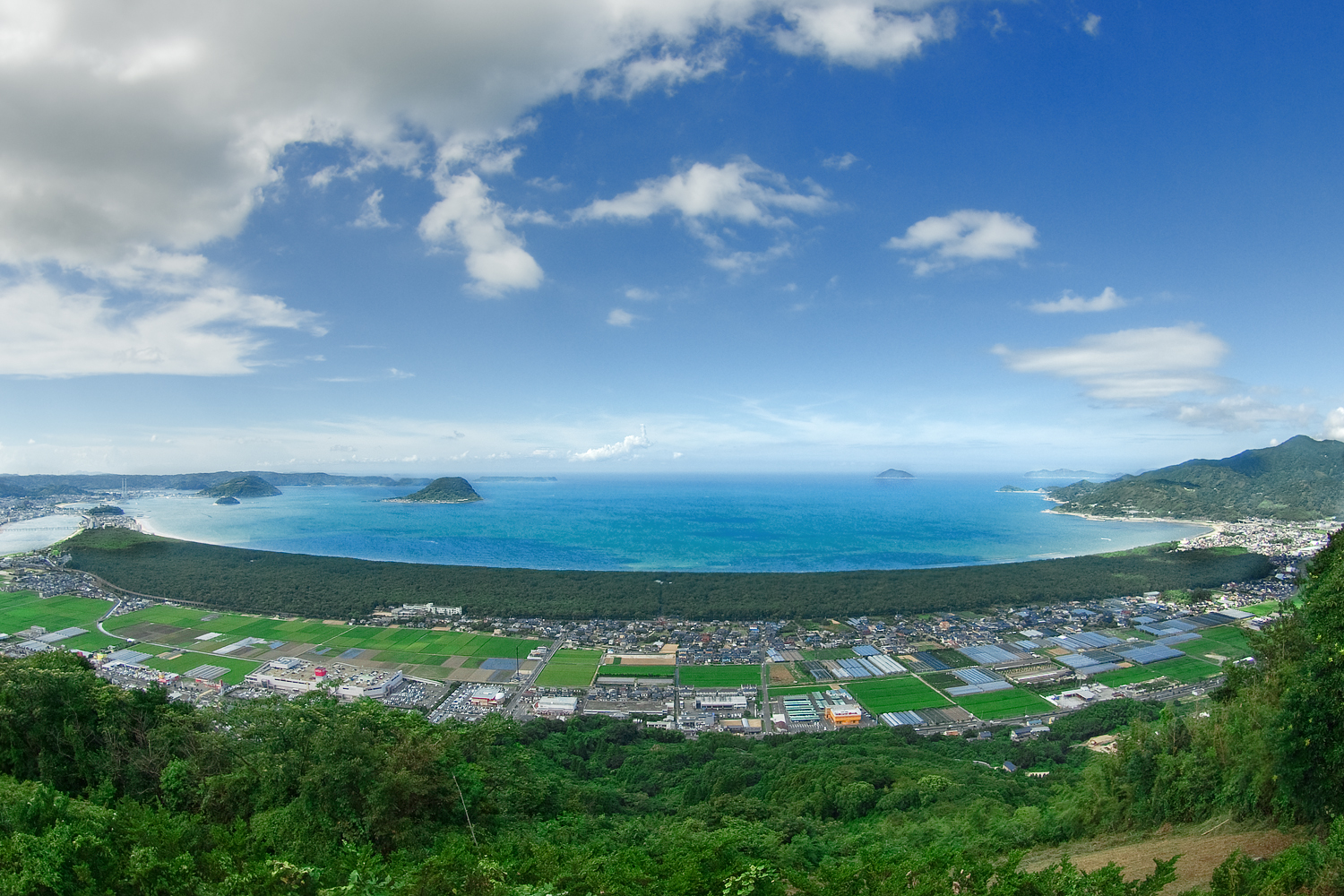
- Nijinomatsubara from Mount Kagami

- Location within Saga Prefecture Location within Japan
- Location: Karatsu, Saga Prefecture, Japan
- Coordinates: 33°26′38.6″N 130°00′48.8″E
- Length: 5 km (3.1 mi)
- Width: 0.5 km (0.31 mi)
- Established: 17th century
- Special National Place of Scenic Beauty

The Nijinomatsubara (虹之松原) is a pine forest stretching along the sand dunes of Matsuragata, in the innermost part of Karatsu Bay, which faces the Genkai Sea in northern Kyushu. Located in the city of Karatsu, Saga Prefecture, it is considered one of Japan's three great pine groves, along with Miho no Matsubara and Amanohashidate, and is a nationally designated Special Place of Scenic Beauty. It stretches approximately five kilometers from east-to-west and is roughly 400 to 600 meters wide from north-to-south. It consists of as many as a million Japanese black pine trees. It is part of the Genkai Quasi-National Park.

== History ==
In the early 17th century, Terazawa Hirotaka, the daimyō of Karatsu Domain, planted trees as a windbreak and sandbreak as part of land reclamation project. Under the protection of the domain, strict restrictions were imposed not only on logging (cutting was punishable by death), but also on the collection of fallen branches for fuel. The pine grove continued carefully managed even after changes in the ruling clan of Karatsu Domain. Due to its length, this pine grove was called "Niri Matsubara" (二里松原) (Two-Ri Pine Grove), which evolved into the present "Niji no Matsubara" (Rainbow Pine Grove), during the Meiji era].

In 1771, it became the site of the "Matsubara-ikki (虹の松原一揆, Niji no Matsubara Rebellion)," a peasant uprising against Karatsu Domain.

After the Meiji Restoration, it was incorporated into the national forest system. Despite its protected status, Saga Prefectural Road 347 runs through the pine grove, and the JR Kyushu Chikuhi Line runs along its southern edge. Exhaust fumes, pine beetles, coastal erosion, and urban encroachment have threatened the survival of the grove. The adjacent beach is known as Higashi-no-hama Beach and features hotels, a national guesthouse, and a campsite.

== See also ==
- List of Places of Scenic Beauty of Japan (Saga)
- List of Special Places of Scenic Beauty, Special Historic Sites and Special Natural Monuments

== Gallery ==
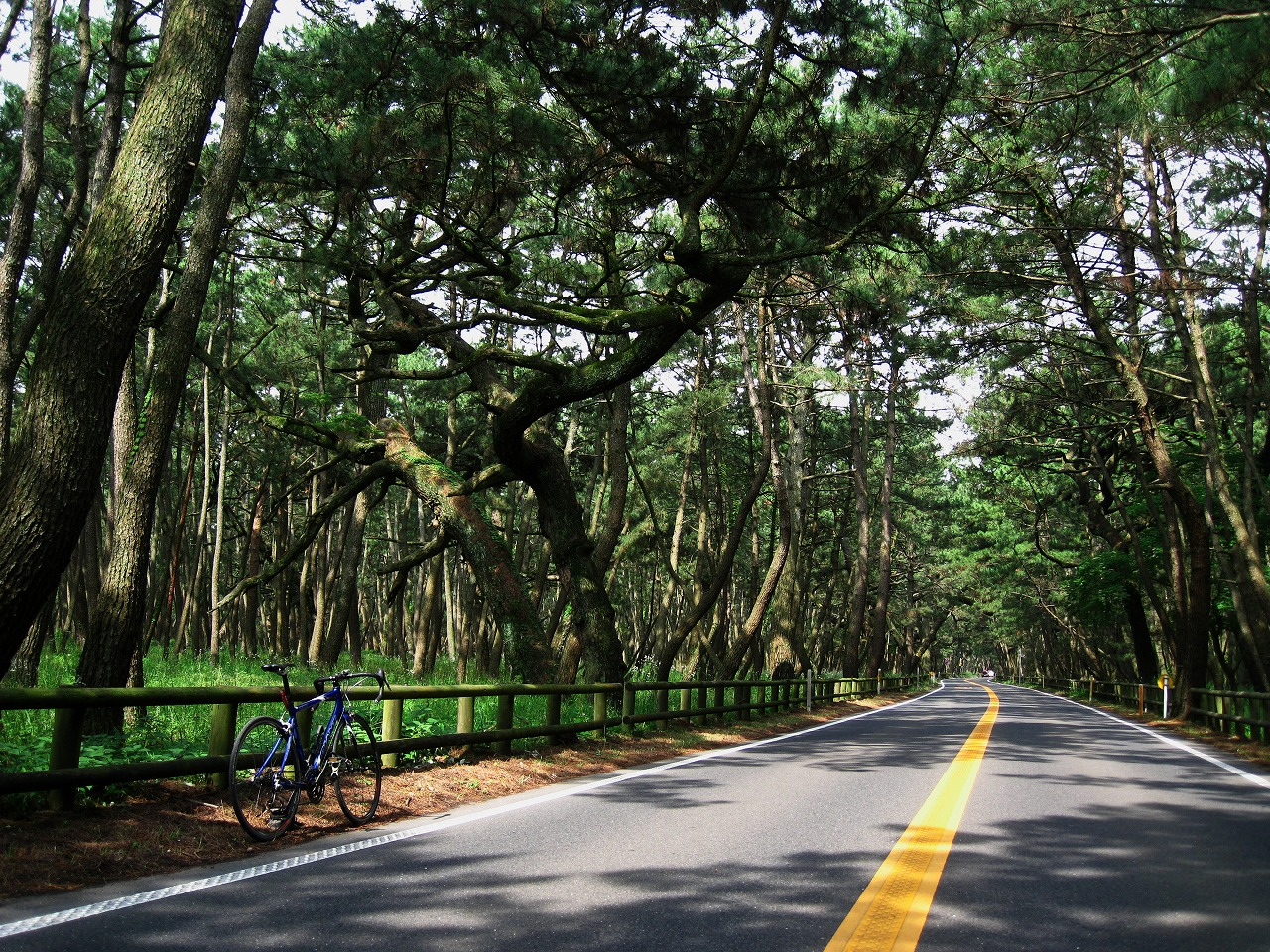
Saga Prefectural Road 347

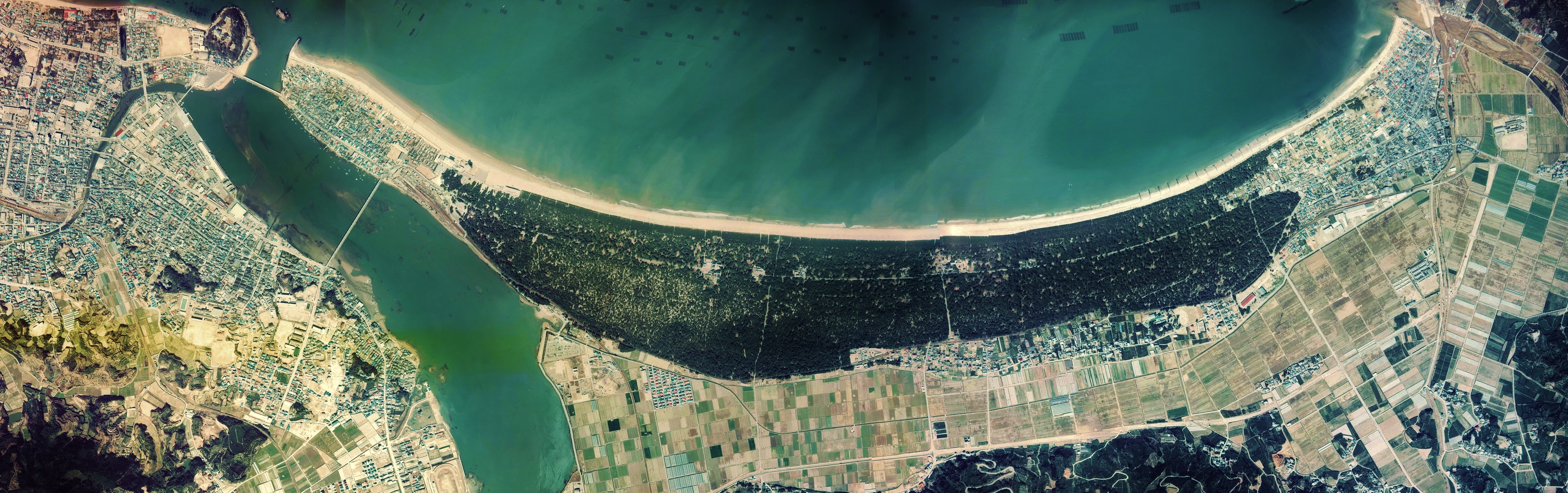
Nijinomatsubara Pine Forest Aerial photograph.1974

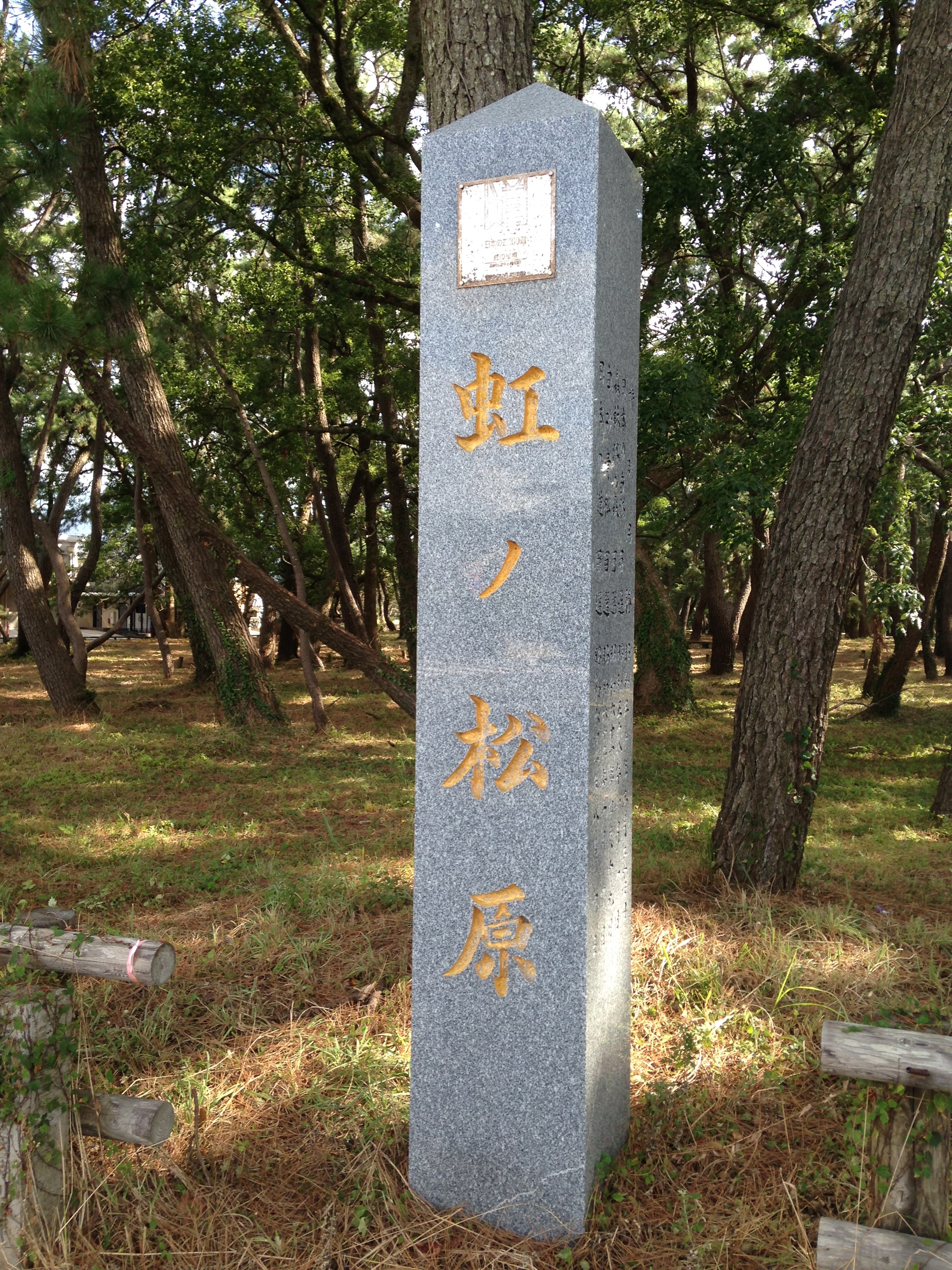
Stele of Nijinomatsubara
