= Taku =

Taku may refer to:

== Places ==
=== North America ===
- the Taku River, in Alaska and British Columbia
  - Fort Taku, also known as Fort Durham and as Taku, a former fort of the Hudson's Bay Company near the mouth of the Taku River
  - the Taku Glacier, in Alaska near Juneau
  - Taku Towers, in Alaska, near Juneau
  - Taku Harbor, in Alaska, near Juneau
  - Taku Inlet, in Alaska
  - the Taku Plateau, in British Columbia
- Taku Arm of Tagish Lake in British Columbia
  - Taku, British Columbia, a locality on Tagish Lake

=== Asia ===
- Taku Forts, forts on the south bank of the Hai He, in Tanggu District, Tianjin municipality, in northeastern China
- Taku, Saga, a city in Saga prefecture on the island of Kyūshū, Japan
- Taku, India, a town in India

=== Oceania ===
- Taku, Kiribati, a village in Kiribati.

== Peoples ==
- The Taku people, an Alaska Native group, who are a kwaan or tribe of the Tlingit
- Taku River Tlingit First Nation, government in British Columbia

== People ==
=== Surname ===
- Moses Taku, a rabbi, 13th-century Tosafist from Bohemia
- Afrim Taku (born 1989), an Albanian soccer player
- Akwo Tarh Ayuk Taku (born 1992), Cameroonian soccer player

=== Nickname ===
- Ta-ku, an Australian musician
- Taku, a nickname for Takuma Sato
- Taku, a nickname for people named Takudzwa, Takura or Takunda in the Shona language

=== Given name ===
"Taku" is a Japanese male given name.

- Taku Akahoshi (赤星 拓; born 1984), Japanese footballer
- Taku Hiraoka (平岡 卓; born 1995), Japanese snowboarder
- Taku Morinaga (森永 卓; born 1995), Japanese footballer
- Taku Hirano (平野 琢也; born 1973), Japanese recording artist and percussionist for Fleetwood Mac
- Taku Kishimoto (岸本卓; born 1975), Japanese screenwriter
- Taku Lee (born 1995), Japanese gridiron football player
- Taku Morishita (born 1966), Japanese shogi player
- Taku Nakanishi (中西 拓; born 1972), Japanese freestyle skier
- Taku Saito (斎藤 卓; born 1979), Japanese basketball coach
- Taku Sugimoto, (born 1965), Japanese guitarist
- Taku Takahashi (born 1974), one half of the hip-hop duo M-Flo
- Taku Ushinohama (牛之濵 拓; born 1992), Japanese footballer
- Taku Watanabe (渡辺 卓; born 1971), Japanese footballer
- Taku Yamamoto (山本 拓; born 1952), Japanese politician

=== Characters ===
- Taku, husband of Marvel Comics superhero Venomm from Black Panther comics

== Transportation ==
- HMS Taku (1900), the former German-built (at Schichau-Werke in 1898) Chinese destroyer Hai Lung captured by the British Navy at the Battle of Taku Forts on 17 June 1900 and added to the British Navy; she was sold in October 1916 to be scrapped
- HMS Taku (N38), a 1939 British T class submarine
- MV Taku, a 1963 vessel for the Alaska Marine Highway System
- USC&GS Taku, an 1898 United States Coast Guard and Geodetic Survey ship
- Taku Station, a railway station in Taku, Saga, Japan

== Animals ==
- Taku (whale), an Orca (killer whale) that once lived at SeaWorld
- The Fijian name for the Hawksbill turtle

== Other uses ==
- Battle of Taku Forts (disambiguation), several battles in China
- Takuu language or "Taku", a Polynesian language (ISO 639-3:nho)
- 9574 Taku, an asteroid
- KTKU, a radio station in Juneau, Alaska, which uses the branding "Taku 105"

== See also ==
- Naka-Taku Station, a railway station in Taku, Saga, Japan
- Higashi-Taku Station, a railway station in Taku, Saga, Japan
- Takou (disambiguation)
- Takuu Atoll, sometimes written as "Takū"
