= Higashi-Taku Station =

Railway station in Taku, Saga Prefecture, Japan

Higashi-Taku Station 東多久駅
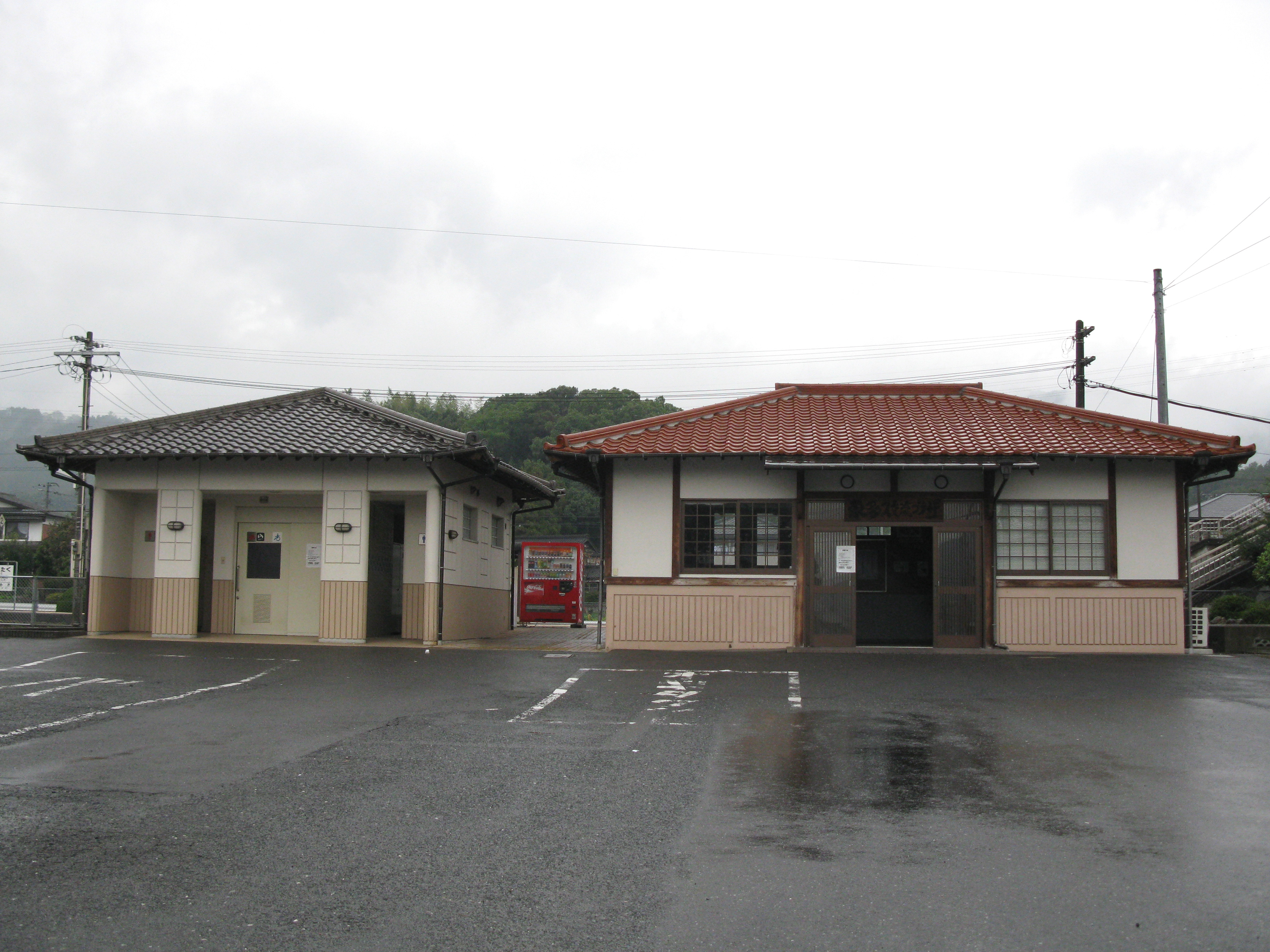
- -Higashi-Taku Station in 2009

General information
- Location: Higashitakumachi Oaza Befu, Taku-shi, Saga-ken 846-0012; Japan
- Coordinates: 33°17′07″N 130°08′37″E
- Operator: JR Kyushu
- Line: JK Karatsu Line
- Distance: 10.6 km from Kubota
- Platforms: 2 side platforms
- Tracks: 2 + 1 siding

Construction
- Structure type: At grade
- Accessible: No - platforms linked by footbridge

Other information
- Status: Unstaffed
- Website: Official website

History
- Opened: 14 December 1903
- Former names: Befu (until 1 June 1911)

Passengers
- FY2016: 156 daily

Services
Preceding station	JR Kyushu	Following station
Ogi towards Kubota	Karatsu Line	Naka-Taku towards Nishi-Karatsu
Location
- Location within Saga Prefecture Location within Japan

Higashi-Taku Station (東多久駅, Higashi-Taku-eki) is a passenger railway station on the Karatsu Line operated by JR Kyushu located in the city of Taku, Saga Prefecture, Japan.

== Lines ==
The station is served by the Karatsu Line and is located 10.6 km from the starting point of the line at Kubota.

== Station layout ==
The station, which is unstaffed, consists of two opposed unnumbered side platforms serving two tracks. Access to the opposite side platform is by means of a footbridge. A waiting room and toilet building has been built near the footbridge. A siding branches off track 2.

=== Platforms ===
south side	■ JK Karatsu Line	for Karatsu and Nishi-Karatsu
north side	■ JK Karatsu Line	for Saga

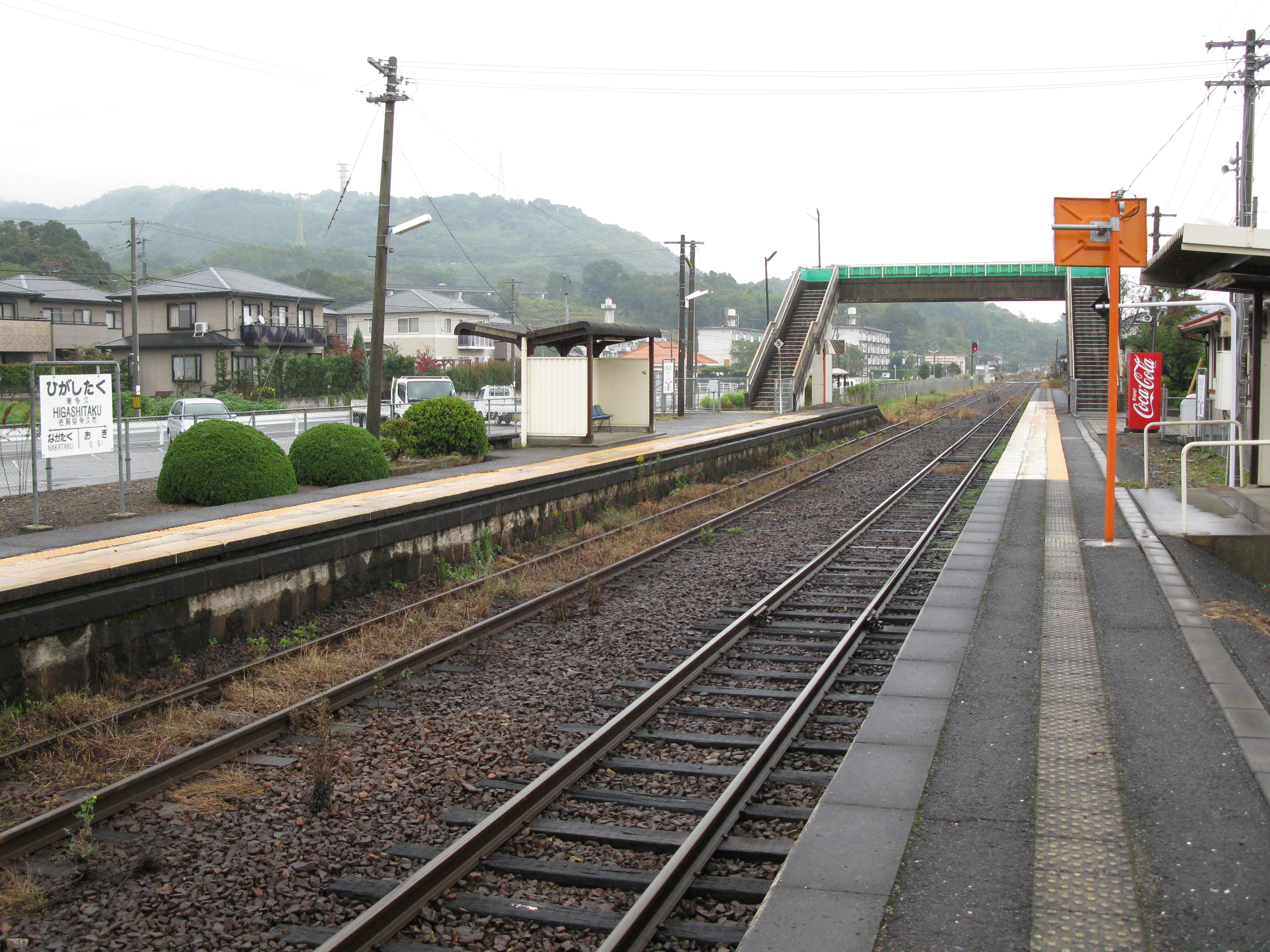
View of the platforms and tracks.

== History ==
The Karatsu Kogyo Railway had opened a track from Miyoken (now Nishi-Karatsu) which, by 25 December 1899, had reached Azamibaru (now Taku). On 23 February 1902, the company, now renamed the Karatsu Railway, merged with the Kyushu Railway which undertook the next phase of expansion. The track was extended east, with Kubota opening as the final eastern terminus on 14 December 1903. Higashi-Taku (then named Befu Station (別府駅)) opened on the same day as an intermediate station on the track. When the Kyushu Railway was nationalized on 1 July 1907, Japanese Government Railways (JGR) took over control of the station. On 12 October 1909, the line which served the station was designated the Karatsu Line. On 1 June 1911, the station was renamed Higashi-Taku. With the privatization of Japanese National Railways (JNR), the successor of JGR, on 1 April 1987, control of the station passed to JR Kyushu.

== Passenger statistics ==
In fiscal 2016, the daily average number of passengers using the station (boarding passengers only) was above 100 and below 323. The station did not rank among the top 300 busiest stations of JR Kyushu.

== Surrounding area ==
- Japan National Route 203
- Higashi-Taku Post office
- Nagasaki Expressway

== See also ==
- List of railway stations in Japan
