= List of cultural properties of Japan – structures (Saga) =

This list is of the cultural properties of Japan designated in the category of structures (建造物, kenzōbutsu) for the Prefecture of Saga.

== National Cultural Properties ==
As of 1 March 2024, thirteen Important Cultural Properties with sixteen component structures have been designated, being of national significance.

Property	Date	Municipality	Comments	Image	Coordinates	Ref.
Yoshimura Family Residence 吉村家住宅; Yoshimura-ke jūtaku	1789	Saga			33°27′28″N 130°11′49″E	
Former Takatori Family Residence 旧高取家住宅 kyū-Takatori-ke jūtaku	1904	Karatsu	designation comprises two components: the buildings for the large central room (hiroma) and living room (kyoshitsu)		33°27′16″N 129°58′19″E	
Saga Castle Shachinomon and Tsuzuki Yagura 佐賀城鯱の門及び続櫓; Saga-jō shachi-no-mon oyobi tsuzuki-yagura	1836	Saga			33°14′45″N 130°18′10″E	
Yamaguchi Family Residence 山口家住宅; Yamaguchi-ke jūtaku	Meiji period	Saga			33°10′32″N 130°20′27″E	
Nishioka Family Residence 西岡家住宅; Nishioka-ke jūtaku	end of Edo period	Ureshino			33°07′48″N 130°03′36″E	
Kawauchi Family Residence 川打家住宅; Kawauchi-ke jūtaku	Edo period	Taku			33°15′49″N 130°03′10″E	
Taku Seibyō 多久聖廟; Taku Seibyō	1708	Taku			33°15′36″N 130°05′52″E	
Tashima Jinja Honden 田嶋神社本殿; Tashima Jinja honden	early Muromachi period	Imari			33°21′54″N 129°52′30″E	
Doi Family Residence 土井家住宅; Doi-ke jūtaku	end of Edo period	Ōmachi			33°12′50″N 130°07′22″E	
Takeo Onsen Shinkan and Rōmon 武雄温泉新館及び楼門; Takeo onsen shinkan oyobi rōmon	1914	Takeo	designation comprises two components: shinkan and rōmon		33°11′48″N 130°00′52″E	
Yoka Jinja Third Torii and Stone Bridge 与賀神社三の鳥居及び石橋; Yoka Jinja san-no-torii oyobi ishi-bashi	1603	Saga	designation comprises two components: third torii and stone bridge		33°14′56″N 130°17′40″E	
Yoka Jinja Rōmon 与賀神社楼門; Yoka Jinja rōmon	Momoyama period	Saga			33°14′56″N 130°17′40″E	
Chikugo River Lift Bridge 旧筑後川橋梁(筑後川昇開橋) kyū-Chikugo-gawa kyōryō (Chikugo-gawa shōkaikyō)	1935	Saga	designation spans the borders with Ōkawa, Fukuoka		33°12′54″N 130°21′42″E	
Former Tashiro Family Western-style House 旧田代家西洋館; Former Tashiro Family Western-style House	1876	Arita			33°11′24″N 129°53′52″E	

== Prefectural Cultural Properties ==
As of 1 October 2014, nineteen properties with twenty-one component structures have been designated at a prefectural level.

Property	Date	Municipality	Comments	Image	Coordinates	Ref.
Kashii Jinja Yotsuashimon 香椎神社四脚門; Kashii Jinja Yotsuashimon	early Edo period	Saga			33°14′58″N 130°14′10″E	
Kashima Castle Akamon and Ōtemon 鹿島城赤門及び大手門; Kashima Jinja Akamon oyobi Ōtemon	early C19	Kashima			33°06′10″N 130°05′36″E	
Wakamiya Hachimangū Shinden 若宮八幡宮神殿; Wakamiya Hachimangū shinden	early Edo period	Taku			33°15′29″N 130°05′27″E	
Takezaki Kannon Stone Three-Storey Pagodas 竹崎観音石造三重塔; Takezaki Kannon seki-zō sanjūtō	end of Kamakura period	Tara	two tō		32°57′26″N 130°13′11″E	
Murozono Jinja Stone Hizen Torii 石造肥前鳥居 seki-zō Hizen torii	1590	Karatsu			33°19′17″N 130°03′47″E	
Ushinoo Jinja Stone Hizen Torii 石造肥前鳥居 seki-zō Hizen torii	1597	Ogi			33°15′32″N 130°10′59″E	
Kushida-gū Stone Hizen Torii 石造肥前鳥居 seki-zō Hizen torii	1602	Kanzaki			33°18′36″N 130°22′21″E	
Honjō Jinja Stone Hizen Torii 石造肥前鳥居 seki-zō Hizen torii	1603	Saga			33°14′38″N 130°16′56″E	
Hatten Jinja Stone Bridge 石造眼鏡橋 seki-zō megane-bashi	1852	Ureshino			33°06′03″N 130°03′24″E	
Seigan-ji Rōmon 星巌寺楼門; Seiganji rōmon	1852	Ogi			33°17′57″N 130°11′11″E	
Ōdō Jinja Stone Myōjin Torii 銅造明神鳥居 dō-zō Myōjin torii	1640	Saga			33°14′12″N 130°21′57″E	
Yūtoku Inari Jinja Precinct Myōbusha 祐徳稲荷神社境内社命婦社; Yūtoku Inari Jinja keidai sha myōbusha	1804	Kashima			33°04′24″N 130°06′29″E	
Former Mitsubishi Gōshi Kaisha Karatsu Branch Honkan 旧三菱合資会社唐津支店本館 kyū-Mitsubishi gōshi kaisha Karatsu shiten honkan	1908	Karatsu	preserved as the Karatsu City Museum of History and Folklore (唐津市歴史民族資料館)		33°28′15″N 129°57′14″E	
Jissō-in Niōmon 実相院仁王門; Jissō-in Niōmon	early Edo period	Saga			33°19′39″N 130°16′02″E	
Yodohime Shrine West Gate 与止日女神社西門 &odohime Jinja nishi mon	1573	Saga			33°19′35″N 130°16′06″E	
Kōden-ji Shakadō 高伝寺釈迦堂; Kōdenji Shakadō	1655	Saga			33°14′16″N 130°16′59″E	
Seigan-ji Otamaya 星巌寺御霊屋; Seiganji otamaya	mid-C18	Ogi			33°17′57″N 130°11′11″E	
Former Nakao Family Residence - Main Building 旧中尾家住宅主屋 kyū-Nakao-ke jūtaku shuoku	C18	Karatsu			33°32′23″N 129°53′41″E	
Former Karatsu Bank Head Office 旧唐津銀行本店 kyū-Karatsu-ginkō honten	C18	Karatsu			33°15′56″N 129°34′54″E	
Stone Hizen Torii (Inasa Shrine) with the inscription of Tensho 13 石造肥前鳥居（稲佐神社）天正十三年の銘をもつもの sekizō hizen torii inasa jinja tenshō jūsan nen no mei o motsu mono	C18	Shiroishi			33°32′23″N 129°53′41″E	
Former Saga Castle Honmaru Goten Gozanoma and Kannindokoro 旧佐賀城本丸御殿 御座間及び堪忍所 kyū sagajō honmaru goten gozanoma oyobi kannindokoro	C18	Saga			33°32′23″N 129°53′41″E	

== Municipal Cultural Properties ==
As of 1 May 2014, one hundred and two properties have been designated at a municipal level.

== Registered Cultural Properties ==
As of 1 March 2015, ninety-four properties at thirty-five sites have been registered (as opposed to designated) at a national level.

Property	Date	Municipality	Comments	Image	Coordinates	Ref.
Muraoka Sōhonpo Yōkan Museum 村岡総本舗羊羹資料館; Muraoka Sōhonpo yōkan shiryōkan	1941	Ogi			33°18′05″N 130°12′15″E	
Chōkokan 徴古館; Chōkokan	1927	Saga			33°15′06″N 130°18′05″E	
Takeya 竹屋; Takeya	1923	Karatsu			33°26′55″N 129°58′13″E	
Sueyama Jinja Torii 陶山神社鳥居; Sueyama Jinja torii	1888	Arita	ceramic torii		33°11′20″N 129°53′57″E	
Yoka Jinja Honden - Heiden - Haiden 与賀神社本殿・幣殿・拝殿; Yoka Jinja honden-heiden-haiden	1758-59	Saga	the heiden-haiden were repaired in 1913		33°14′59″N 130°17′46″E	

== See also ==
- Cultural Properties of Japan
- National Treasures of Japan
- List of Historic Sites of Japan (Saga)
