= Kafuri Station =

Railway station in Itoshima, Fukuoka Prefecture, Japan

JK 10 Kafuri Station 加布里駅
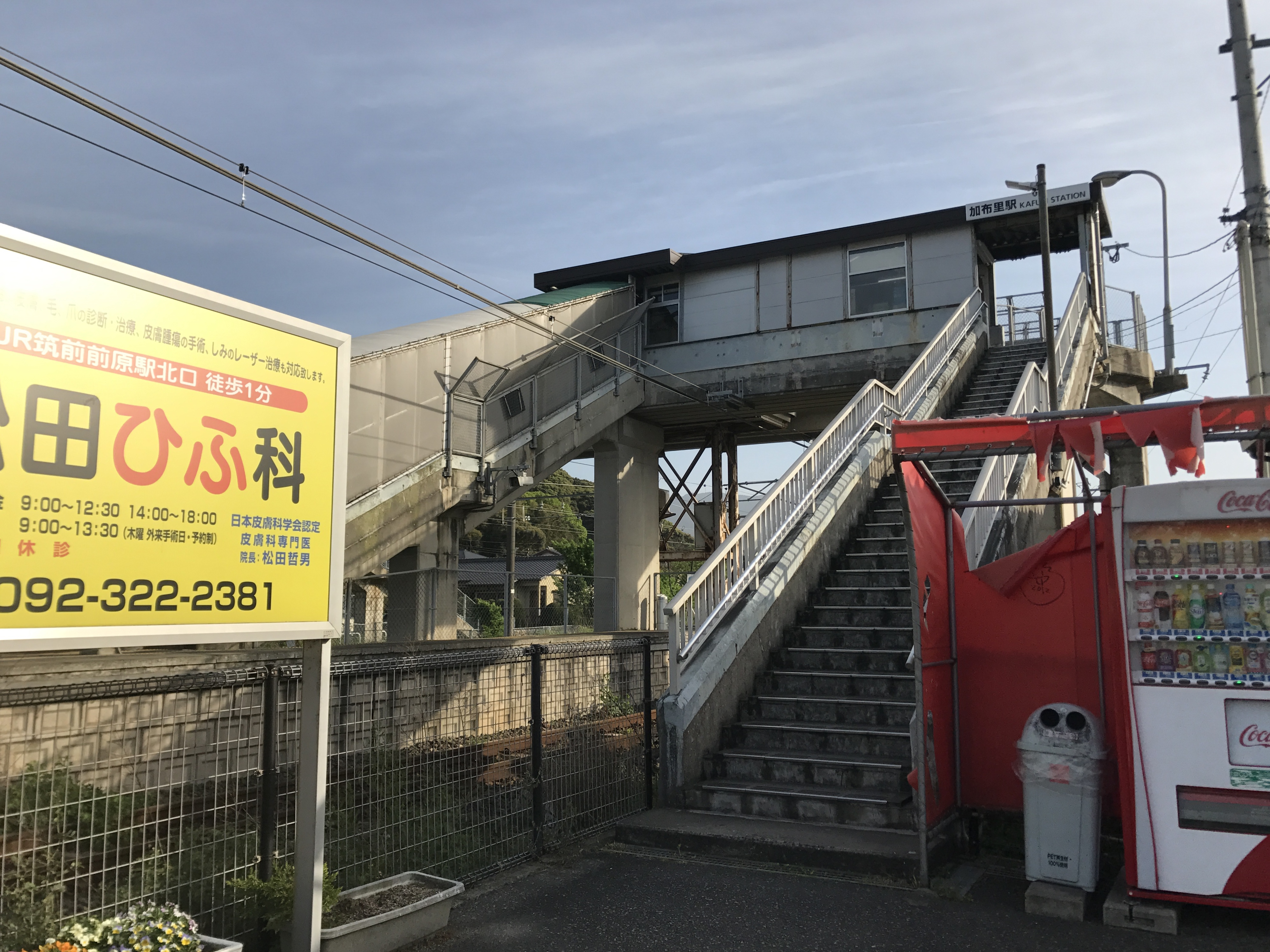
- Kafuri Station in 2017

General information
- Location: 4-chōme-11 Kamiarihigashi, Itoshima-shi, Fukuoka-ken 819-1120; Japan
- Coordinates: 33°32′36″N 130°10′34.5″E
- Operator: JR Kyushu
- Line: JK Chikuhi Line
- Distance: 15.4 km from Meinohama
- Platforms: 1 island platform
- Tracks: 2

Construction
- Structure type: At grade
- Accessible: No - footbridge to platform

Other information
- Status: Unstaffed
- Website: Official website

History
- Opened: 1 April 1924; 102 years ago

Passengers
- FY2020: 530 daily
- Rank: 210th (among JR Kyushu stations)

Services
Preceding station	JR Kyushu	Following station
Ikisan towards Nishi-Karatsu	Chikuhi Line Local	Misakigaoka towards Meinohama
Location
- Location within Fukuoka Prefecture Location within Japan

Kafuri Station (加布里駅, Kafuri-eki) is a passenger railway station located in the city Itoshima, Fukuoka Prefecture, Japan. It is operated by JR Kyushu.

== Lines ==
The station is served by the Chikuhi Line and is located 15.4 km from the starting point of the line at Meinohama. Only local services on the Chikuhi Line stop at this station.

== Station layout ==
The station consists of an island platform serving two tracks. The station building is elevated: the automatic ticket vending machines and ticket gate being located on a bridge which leads to the platform from the access road.

=== Platforms ===
1	■ JK Chikuhi Line	for Chikuzen-Maebaru, Tenjin and Hakata
2	■ JK Chikuhi Line	for Chikuzen-Fukae, Karatsu and Nishi-Karatsu

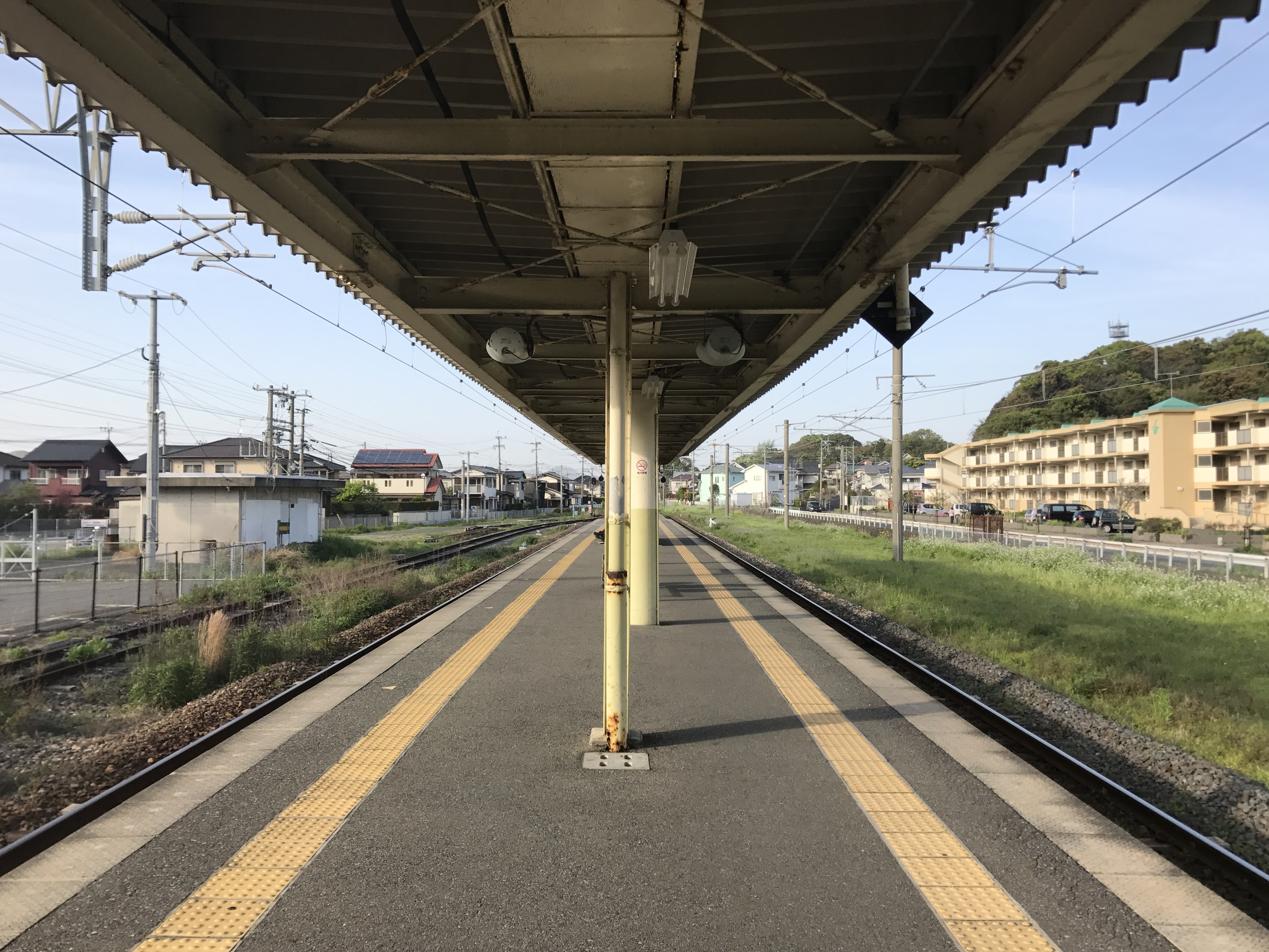
Platform

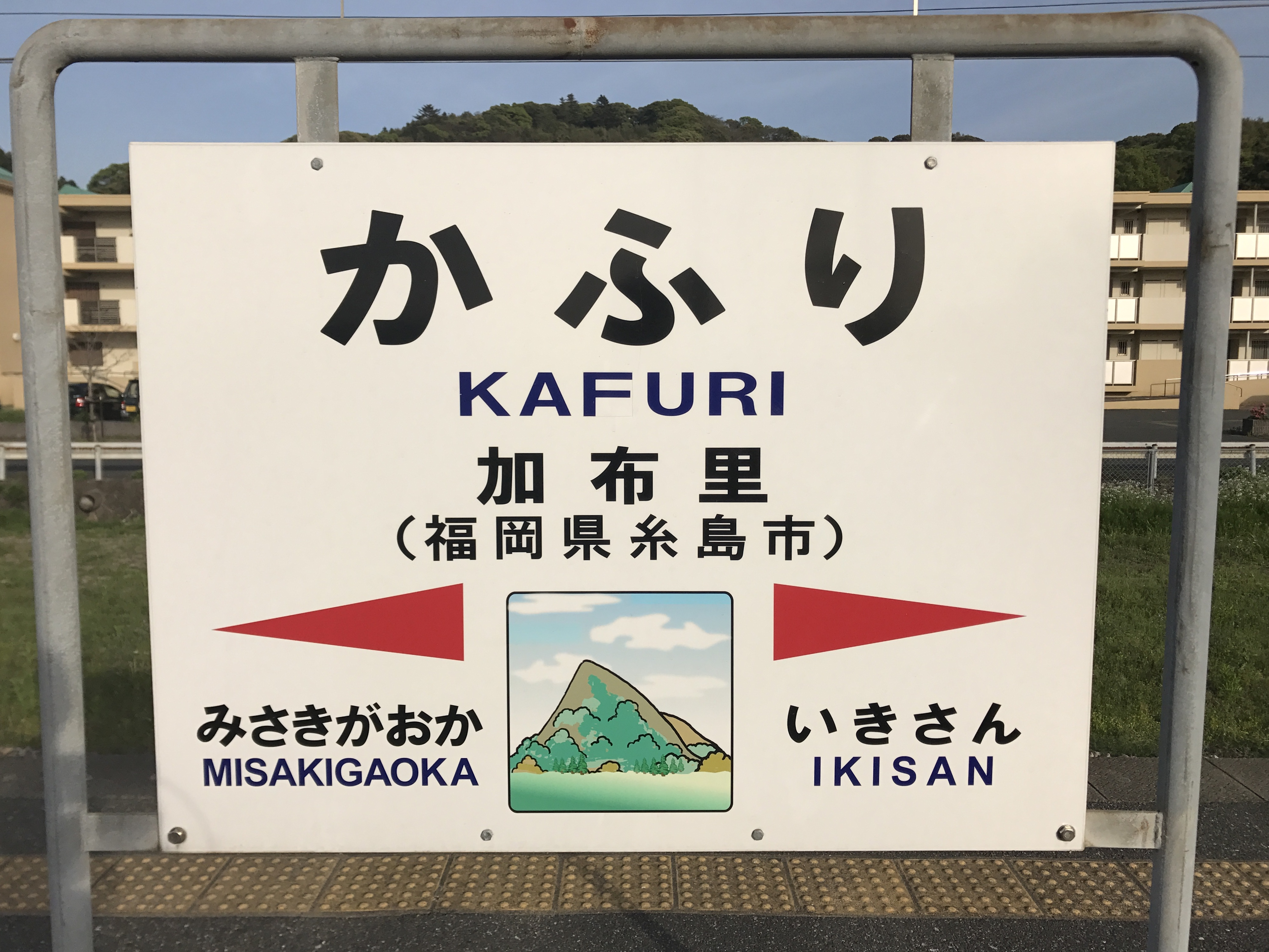
Station sign

== History ==
The private Kitakyushu Railway had opened a track between Fukuyoshi and Hamasaki on 5 December 1923. By 1 April 1924, the line had been extended east to Maebaru (today Chikuzen-Maebaru). Kafuri was opened on the same day as an intermediate station on the new track. When the Kitakyushu Railway was nationalized on 1 October 1937, Japanese Government Railways (JGR) took over control of the station and designated the line which served it as the Chikuhi Line. With the privatization of Japanese National Railways (JNR), the successor of JGR, on 1 April 1987, control of the station passed to JR Kyushu.

The station became unstaffed in 2016.

== Passenger statistics ==
In fiscal 2020, the station was used by an average of 530 passengers daily (boarding passengers only), and it ranked 210th among the busiest stations of JR Kyushu.

== Surrounding area ==
- Itoshima City Kafuri Elementary School
- Kamatsuka Kofun

== See also ==
- List of railway stations in Japan
