= Naka-Taku Station =

Railway station in Taku, Saga Prefecture, Japan

Naka-Taku Station 中多久駅
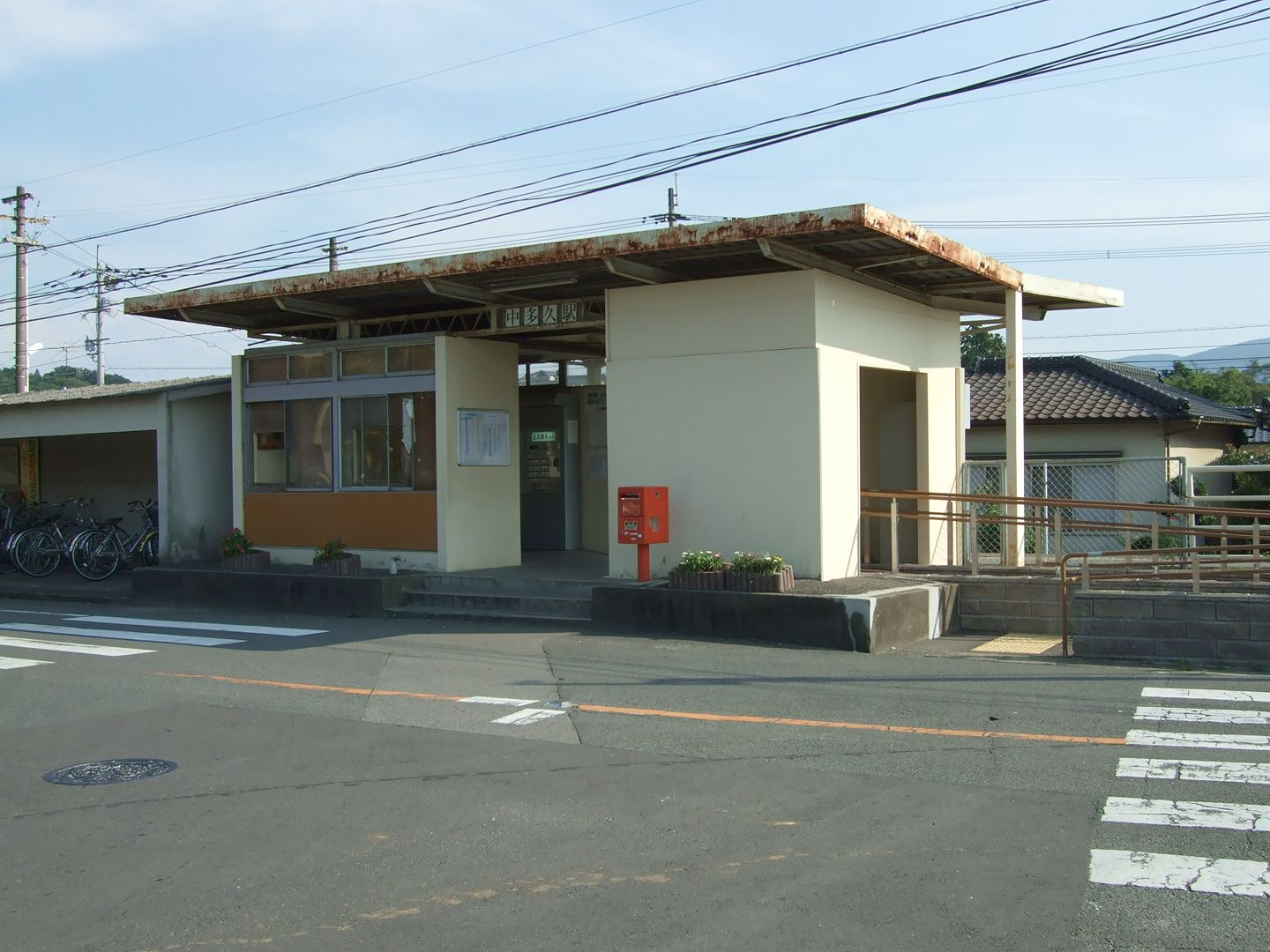
- Naka-Taku Station in 2008

General information
- Location: Minamitakumachi Oaza Nagao, Taku-shi, Saga-ken 846-0023; Japan
- Coordinates: 33°17′00″N 130°06′44″E
- Operator: JR Kyushu
- Line: JK Karatsu Line
- Distance: 13.6 km from Kubota
- Platforms: 1 side platform
- Tracks: 1

Construction
- Structure type: At grade
- Cycle facilities: Bike shed

Other information
- Status: Unstaffed
- Website: Official website

History
- Opened: 1 April 1964

Passengers
- FY2016: 360 daily
- Rank: 252nd (among JR Kyushu stations)

Services
Preceding station	JR Kyushu	Following station
Higashi-Taku towards Kubota	Karatsu Line	Taku towards Nishi-Karatsu
Location
- Location within Saga Prefecture Location within Japan

Naka-Taku Station (中多久駅, Naka-Taku-eki) is a passenger railway station on the Karatsu Line operated by JR Kyushu located in the city of Taku, Saga Prefecture, Japan.

== Lines ==
The station is served by the Karatsu Line and is located 13.6 km from the starting point of the line at Kubota.

== Station layout ==
The station consists of a side platform serving a single track. A simple prefabricated station building is unstaffed and houses a waiting room and an automatic ticket vending machine. A bike shed is located nearby.

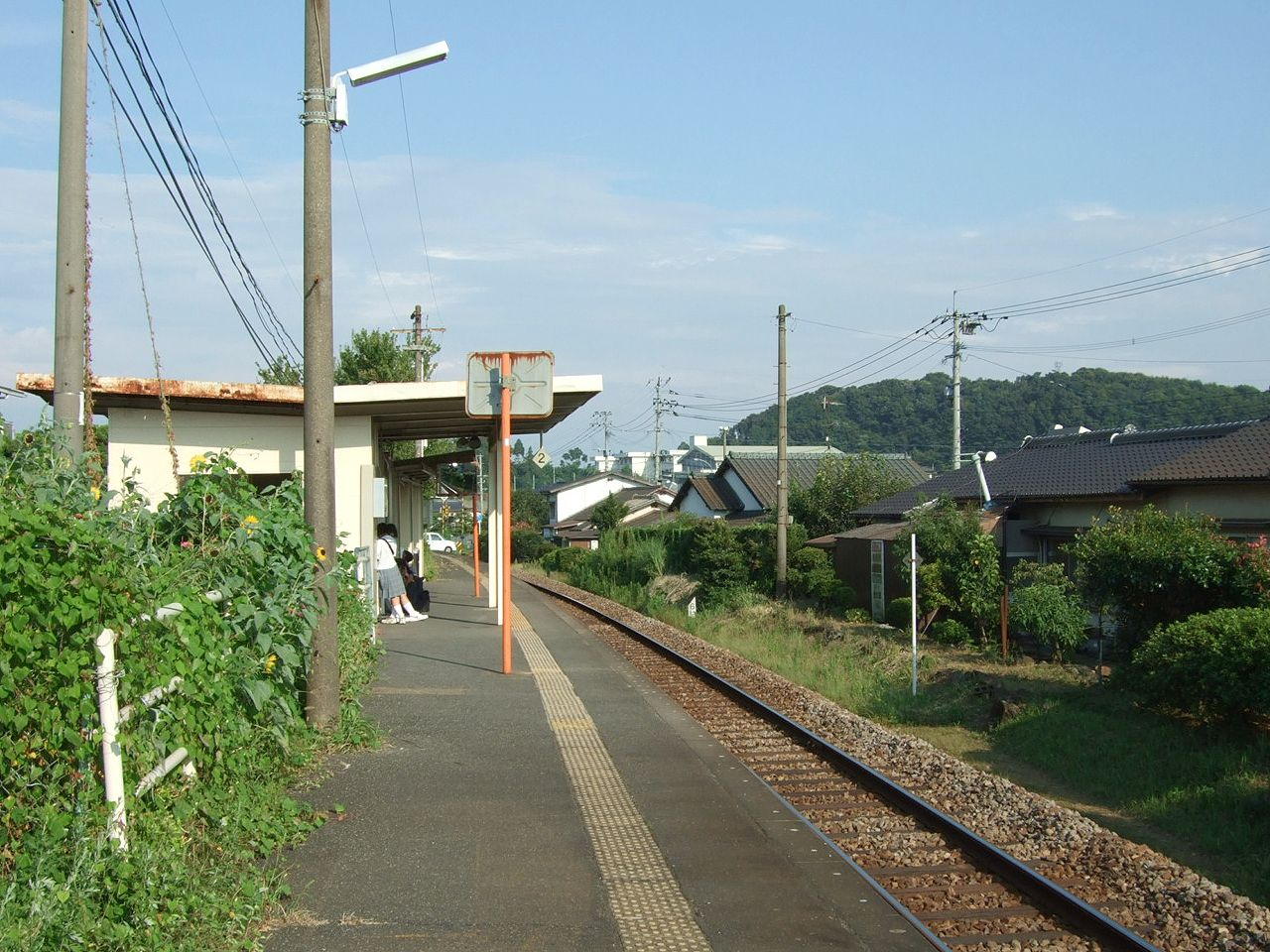
A view of the platforms and tracks.

== History ==
Japanese National Railways (JNR) opened the station on 1 April 1964 as an additional station on the existing track of the Karatsu Line. With the privatization of JNR on 1 April 1987, control of the station passed to JR Kyushu.

== Passenger statistics ==
In fiscal 2020, the station was used by an average of 360 passengers daily (boarding passengers only), and it ranked 242nd among the busiest stations of JR Kyushu.

== Surrounding area ==
- Taku City Junior High School
- Naka-Taku Hospital
- Saga Women's College Hishinomi Kindergarten
- Taku City Hall
- Taku City Library
- Taku Post office
- Taku City Chūō Junior High School
- Saga Prefectural Taku High School

== See also ==
- List of railway stations in Japan
