= Takou =

Takou may refer to:

== Places ==
- Takou, Benin
- Takou, Burkina Faso
- Tà Cú Mountain, Vietnam
- Tākou Bay, New Zealand
- Takou River, New Zealand
- Takou Route, a trail used during the Klondike Gold Rush

== Other uses ==
- Dieudonné Takou (born 1960), Cameroonian weightlifter
- French destroyer Takou, a naval vessel 1900–1911
- Takou bent-toed gecko, a species of gecko
- Ta Kou marbled gecko, a species of gecko

== See also ==
- Taku (disambiguation)
- Taku Forts, by the Hai River estuary in Tianjin, China
