= Ogi Station =

Railway station in Ogi, Saga Prefecture, Japan

Ogi Station 小城駅
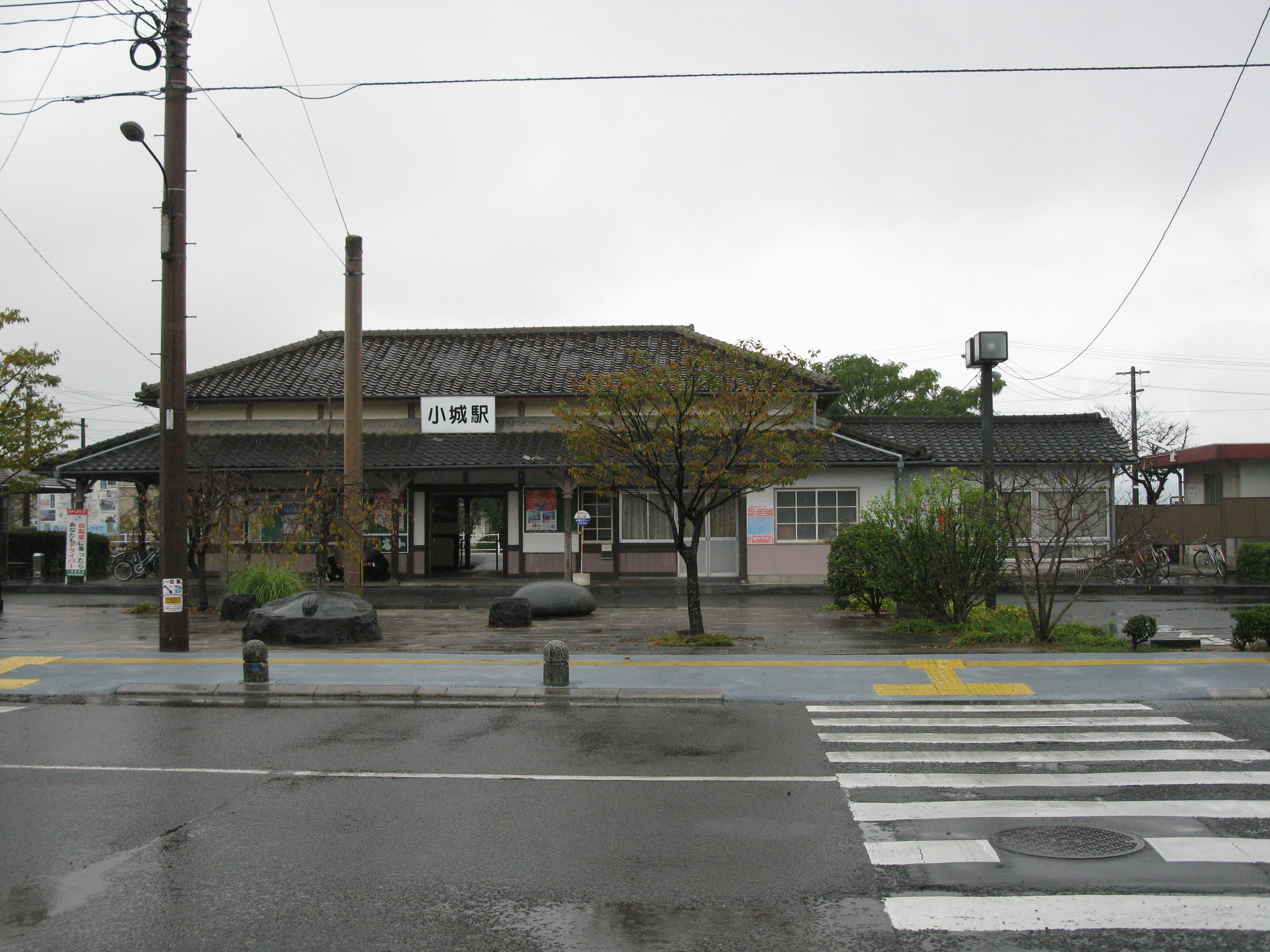
- Ogi Station in 2009

General information
- Location: 2083 Mikatsukicho Kume, Ogi-shi, Saga-ken 845-0022; Japan
- Coordinates: 33°17′08″N 130°11′57″E
- Operator: JR Kyushu
- Line: JK Karatsu Line
- Distance: 5.1 km from Kubota
- Platforms: 2 side platforms
- Tracks: 2

Construction
- Structure type: At grade

Other information
- Status: Staffed ticket window (outsourced)
- Website: Official website

History
- Opened: 14 December 1903

Passengers
- FY2022: 919 daily
- Rank: 144th (among JR Kyushu stations)

Services
Preceding station	JR Kyushu	Following station
Kubota Terminus	Karatsu Line	Higashi-Taku towards Nishi-Karatsu
Location
- Location within Saga Prefecture Location within Japan

Ogi Station (小城駅, Ogi-eki) is a passenger railway station on the Karatsu Line operated by JR Kyushu located in Ogi, Saga Prefecture, Japan.

== Lines ==
The station is served by the Karatsu Line and is located 5.1 km from the starting point of the line at Kubota.

== Station layout ==
The station consists of two side platforms serving two tracks. Platform 2 was once an island platform but the middle track has been removed. The station building, of traditional Japanese architecture, houses a waiting room and ticket window. Access to platform 2 is by means of a level crossing.

Management of the station has been outsourced to the JR Kyushu Tetsudou Eigyou Co., a wholly owned subsidiary of JR Kyushu specialising in station services. It staffs the ticket window which is equipped with a POS machine but does not have a Midori no Madoguchi facility.

=== Platforms ===
1	■ JK Karatsu Line	for Saga
2	■ JK Karatsu Line	for Karatsu and Nishi-Karatsu

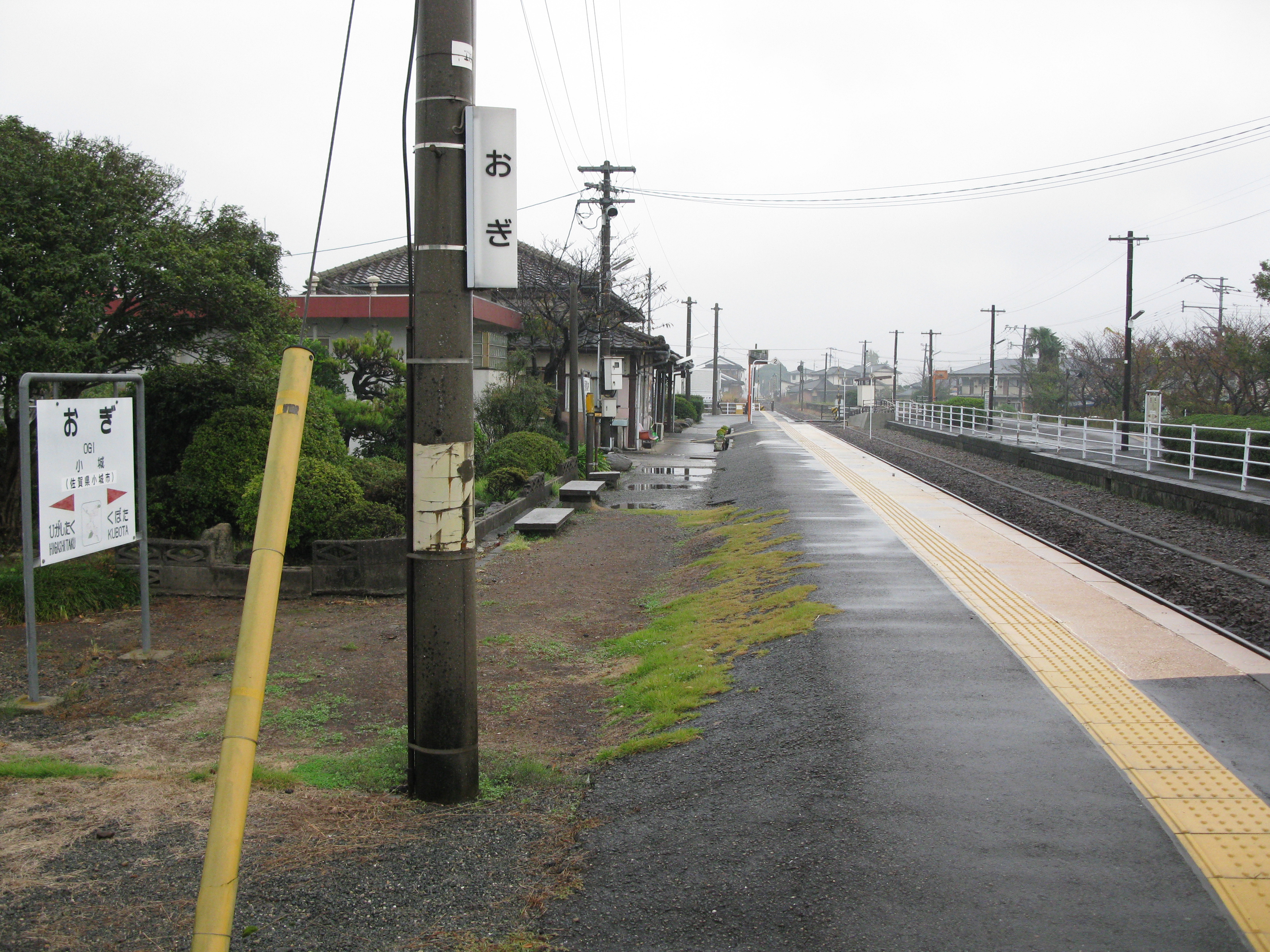
View of platform 1. Note the track bed of the former centre track which has been removed.

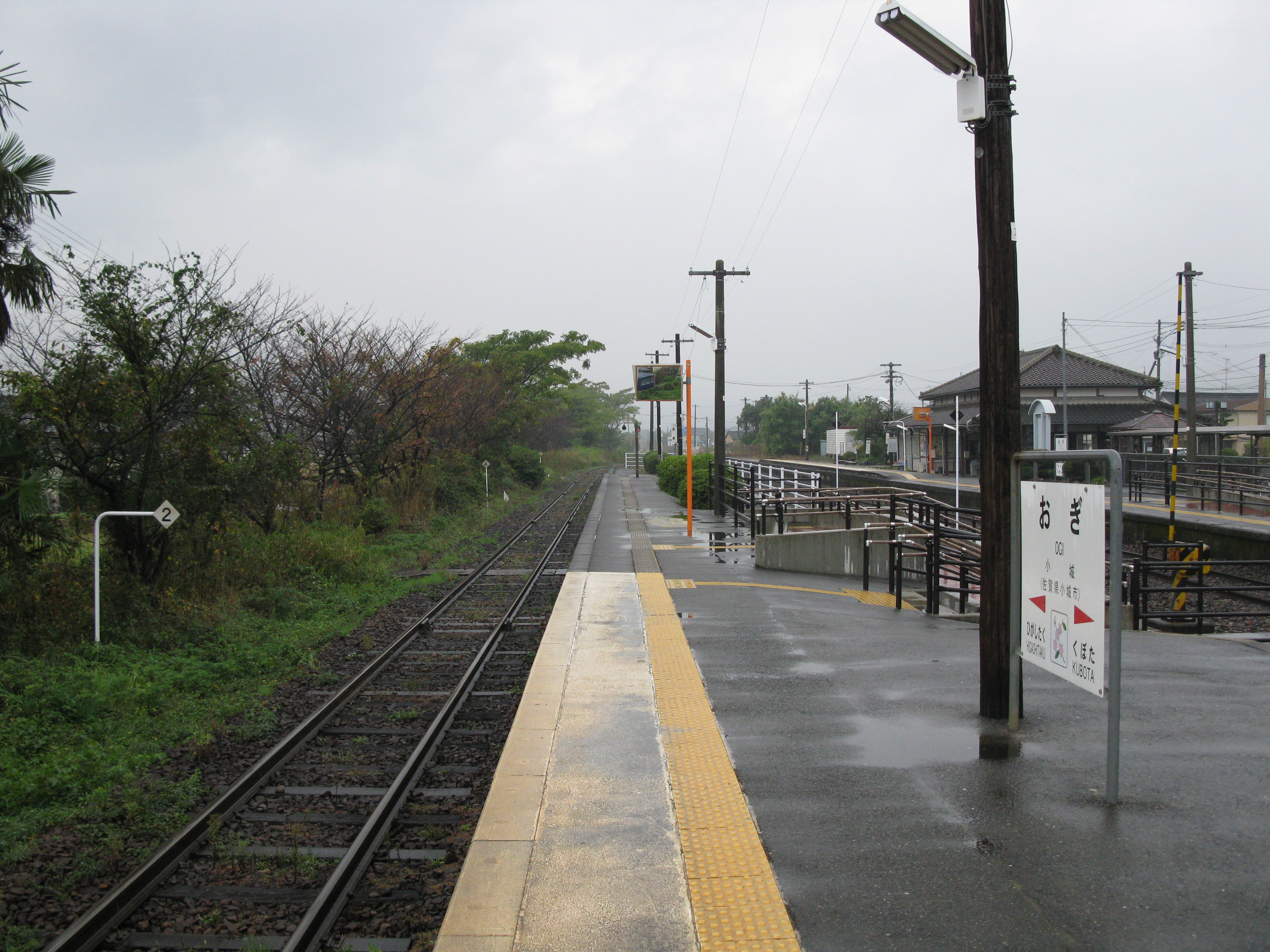
View of platform 2. A fence has been set up on one side of this former island platform converted to a side platform.

== History ==
The Karatsu Kogyo Railway had opened a track from Miyoken (now Nishi-Karatsu) which, by 25 December 1899, had reached Azamibaru (now Taku). On 23 February 1902, the company, now renamed the Karatsu Railway, merged with the Kyushu Railway which undertook the next phase of expansion. The track was extended east, with Kubota opening as the final eastern terminus on 14 December 1903. Ogi opened on the same day as an intermediate station on the track. When the Kyushu Railway was nationalized on 1 July 1907, Japanese Government Railways (JGR) took over control of the station. On 12 October 1909, the line which served the station was designated the Karatsu Line. With the privatization of Japanese National Railways (JNR), the successor of JGR, on 1 April 1987, control of the station passed to JR Kyushu.

== Passenger statistics ==
In fiscal 2020, the station was used by an average of 919 passengers daily (boarding passengers only), and it ranked 144th among the busiest stations of JR Kyushu.

== Surrounding area ==
- Ogi City Health and Welfare Center
- Saga Prefectural Ogi High School
- Ogi City Ogi Junior High School

== See also ==
- List of railway stations in Japan
