= Kamatsuka Kofun =

- 釜塚古墳 (Japanese)
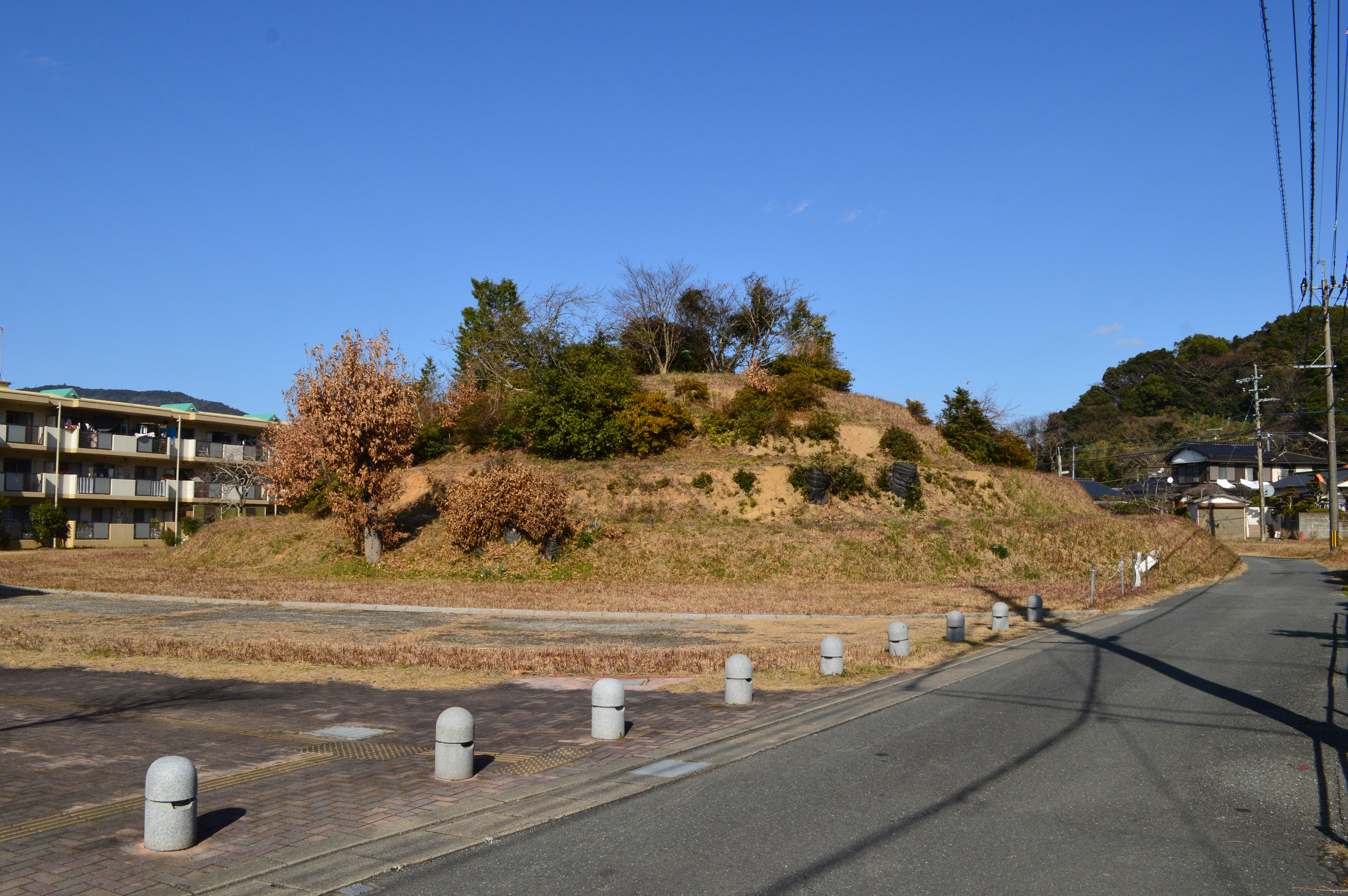
- Kamatsuka Kofun

- Kamatsuka Kofun Kamatsuka Kofun (Japan)
- Interactive map of Kamatsuka Kofun
- 33°32′37.04″N 130°10′39″E
- Type: Kofun
- Periods: Kofun period
- Location: Itoshima, Fukuoka, Japan
- Region: Kyushu

History
- Built: c.5th century

Site notes
- Public access: Yes (no facilities)

The Kamatsuka Kofun (釜塚古墳) is a Kofun period burial mound, located in the Kamiari neighborhood of the city of Itoshima, Fukuoka Prefecture Japan. The tumulus was designated a National Historic Site of Japan in 1982.

== Overview ==
The Kamatsuka Kofun is a large enpun (円墳)-style circular tumulus built on the marshland on the east bank of the former mouth of the Nagano River in western Fukuoka Prefecture. It the stone burial chamber was excavated in 1885 and artifacts were unearthed, and three archaeological excavations have been conducted since 1978. The tumulus is 56 meters in diameter and 10 meters in height, making it one of the largest circular tumuli in northern Kyushu. It was constructed in three tiers and is orientated to the southeast Cylindrical haniwa (including "morning glory-shaped" haniwa), figurative haniwa (shield-shaped and house-shaped haniwa), and fukiishi can be seen on the outside of the tumulus. A moat (5–8 meters wide) surrounds the tumulus, and an earthen bridge (crossing embankment) is located on the north side. An outer bank has been recognized on the outside of the moat, and the diameter including the outer bank is 89 meters.

The burial facility is a pit-type horizontal-entrance stone chamber with a box-type stone sarcophagus placed inside. The burial chamber is built by stacking flat broken stones, but large slabs of stone are erected on both sides of the entrance to form walls. There is a protrusion on the back wall for hanging something. The passage is about 100 meters long, opens in a "H" shape, and is one step higher than the main chamber. The passage is entered from above, and the stone chamber has the characteristics of an early horizontal-type stone chamber. Although grave goods are recorded as having been found when the tomb was opened in the Meiji period, no details are preserved and the whereabouts of any artifacts is currently unknown. The burial chamber is currently preserved in a backfilled state.

The construction date of the tumulus is estimated to be around the first half of the 5th century, during the middle of the Kofun period. The style of the burial chamber indicates a connection with the Korean Peninsula, whereas the presence of a moat also indicates a connection with the Yamato kingdom. In addition, it is unusual for a large tomb to be built on low, marshy land.

The tumulus is approximately a five-minute walk from JR Kyushu Chikuhi Line Kafuri Station.

== See also ==
- List of Historic Sites of Japan (Fukuoka)
