= Taku Seibyō =

Confucian temple in Taku, Saga, Japan

Coordinates: 33°15′36.0″N 130°5′52.0″E

- 多久聖廟
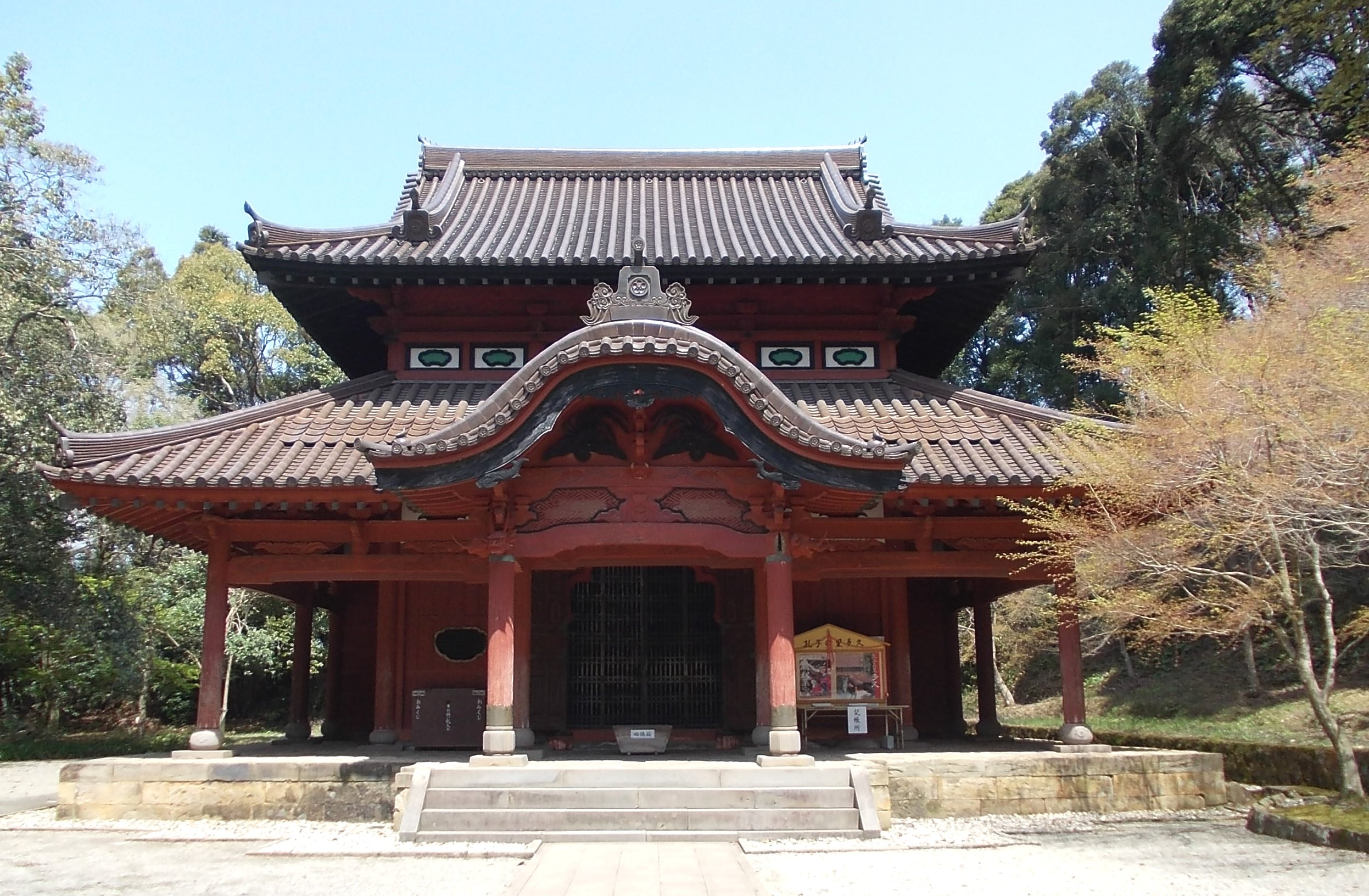
- Taku Seibyō

- Location within Saga Prefecture Location within Japan

Religion
- Affiliation: Confucianism
- Rite: Japanese Neo-Confucianism

Location
- Location: Taku, Saga
- Country: Japan
- Interactive map of Taku Seibyō

Architecture
- Completed: 1708
- National Historic Site of Japan Important Cultural Property

Taku Seibyō (多久聖廟) is a Confucian temple in the city of Taku, Saga Prefecture, Japan. It was designated a National Historic Site in 1921 and a National Important Cultural Property in 1933.

== Overview ==
The Taku Seibyō is a shrine to Confucius, located on the west side of Mount Shiihara, in the southeast of the city. In 1699, Taku Shigefumi, the local village headman, built the Gakumonsho (later Higashihara Shosha) for the purpose of promoting education and enshrined the statue of Confucius imported from China in its lecture hall. In 1708, the current worship hall was completed at the foot of Mount Shiihara, with a bronze statue cast in Kyoto. After completion, the complex was called Kyōanden (恭安殿), and unusual for Edo period, was an academy open to all students regardless of their social class. The curriculum included Chinese studies and various martial arts. The Taku Seibyō itself is a three-bay Zen Buddhist temple-style structure decorated with a variety of Chinese-style patterns not seen in other Confucius shrines, and carvings on its exterior include the phoenix, kirin, elephant, and dragon, animals which are said to bring about a peaceful and prosperous society with good governance and education. Most of the craftsmen and materials for construction were provided within the village.

It is located approximately 4.3 kilometers, or ten minutes by car, south of Taku Station on the JR Kyushu Karatsu Line.

== See also ==
- List of Historic Sites of Japan (Saga)
