= Battle of Taku Forts =

The Battle of Taku Forts may refer to:

- Battle of Taku Forts (1858), an unsuccessful Chinese defense during the Second Opium War
- Battle of Taku Forts (1859), a successful Chinese defense during the Second Opium War
- Battle of Taku Forts (1860), an unsuccessful Chinese defense during the Second Opium War
- Battle of the Taku Forts (1900), an unsuccessful Chinese defense during the Boxer Rebellion
