= Karatsu Line =

Railway station in Saga Prefecture, Japan

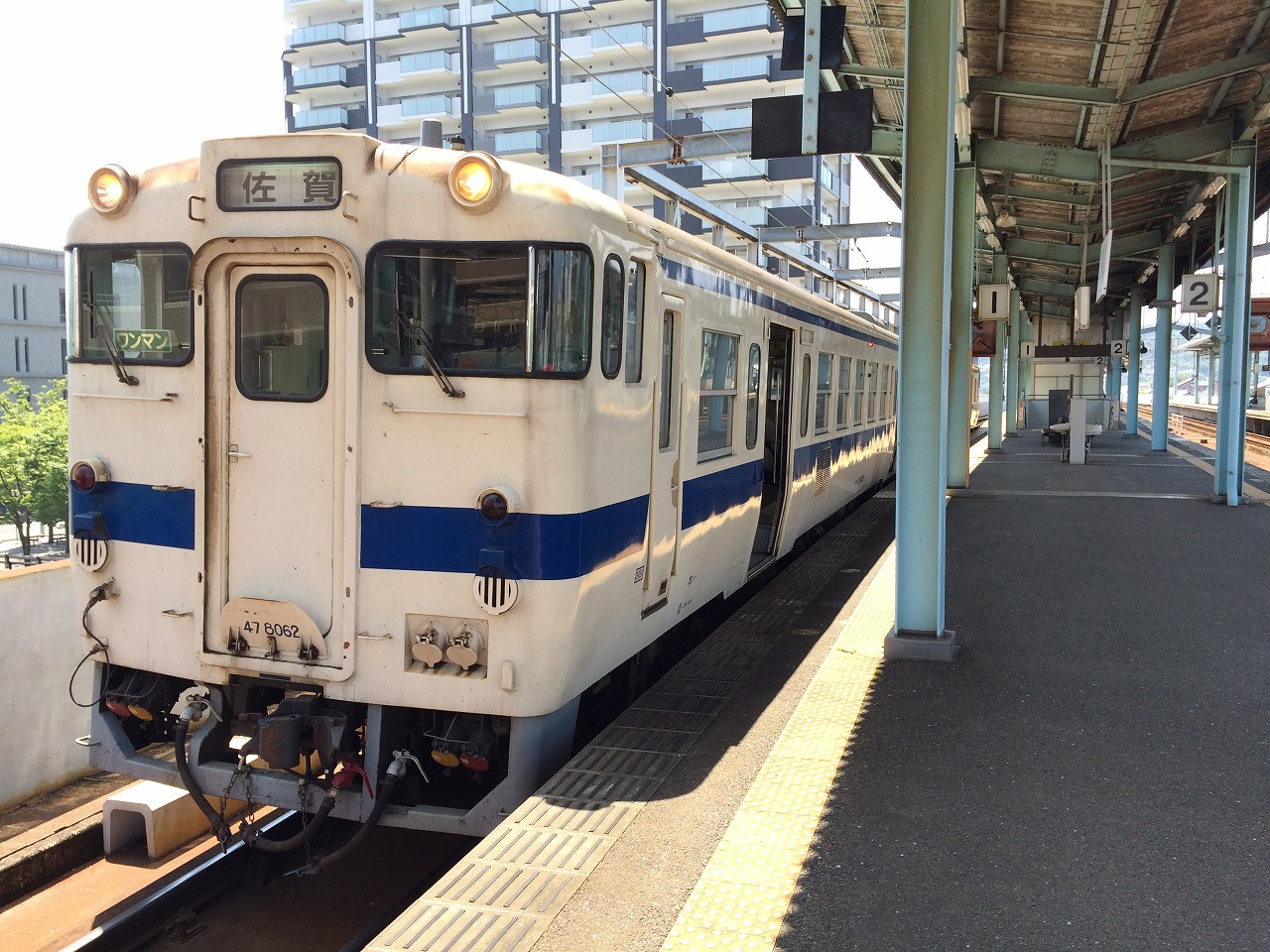

Overview
- Owner: JR Kyushu
- Locale: Saga Prefecture
- Termini: Kubota; Nishi-Karatsu
- Stations: 13

Service
- Type: Regional rail

History
- Opened: 1898; 128 years ago

Technical
- Line length: 42.5 km (26.4 mi)
- Number of tracks: Single
- Track gauge: 1,067 mm (3 ft 6 in)
- Electrification: 1,500 V DC, overhead catenary (Karatsu to Nishi-Karatsu)
Route map
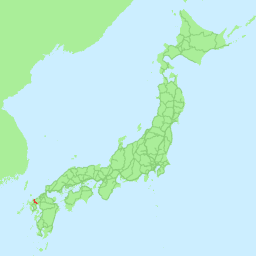
Map of Japan with the Karatsu Line highlighted in red

The Karatsu Line (唐津線, Karatsu-sen) is a regional railway line in Saga Prefecture, Japan, owned and operated by Kyushu Railway Company (JR Kyushu). It connects Kubota in Saga City to Nishi-Karatsu in Karatsu City, both in Saga Prefecture, Japan. The line was originally constructed to carry coal from the Karatsu coal fields to the Port of Karatsu for export and had many branch lines to coal mines which have since closed.

== Operation ==
All trains running on the Karatsu Line stop at all stations along the line, including through services from both sections of the Chikuhi Line. All trains that run to/from Kubota Station use the Nagasaki Main Line to terminate at Saga Station instead.

== Station list ==
Station numbering has not been introduced for the Karatsu Line, but both Karatsu and Nishi-Karatsu use the station numbering from the eastern section of the Chikuhi Line.

No.	Station	Japanese	Distance (km)	Connecting lines	Location	
↑ Through services to/from Saga via the Nagasaki Main Line ↑
	Kubota	久保田	0.0	JH Nagasaki Main Line (through service)	Saga	Saga Prefecture
	Ogi	小城	5.1		Ogi	Saga Prefecture
	Higashi-Taku	東多久	10.6		Taku	Saga Prefecture
	Naka-Taku	中多久	13.6		Taku	Saga Prefecture
	Taku	多久	15.2		Taku	Saga Prefecture
	Kyūragi	厳木	20.8		Karatsu	Saga Prefecture
	Iwaya	岩屋	23.3		Karatsu	Saga Prefecture
	Ōchi	相知	26.0		Karatsu	Saga Prefecture
	Honmutabe	本牟田部	30.1		Karatsu	Saga Prefecture
↑ Through services to/from Imari via the Chikuhi Line ↑
	Yamamoto	山本	32.9	JK Chikuhi Line (Western section) (through service)	Karatsu	Saga Prefecture
	Onizuka	鬼塚	36.6		Karatsu	Saga Prefecture
↑ Through services to/from Fukuoka Airport via the Chikuhi Line and the Airport Line ↑
JK 20	Karatsu	唐津	40.3	JK Chikuhi Line (Eastern section) (through service)	Karatsu	Saga Prefecture
JK 21	Nishi-Karatsu	西唐津	42.5		Karatsu	Saga Prefecture

== Rolling stock ==
- KiHa 40/47 DMUs
- KiHa 125 DMUs
- 103 series EMUs
- 303 series EMUs
- 305 series EMUs

== History ==
The Karatsu Kogyo Railway opened a line from Myōken (妙見) (today Nishi-Karatsu to Yamamoto in 1898, on an alignment paralleling the west bank of the Matsuura River, and extended the line to Taku the following year. In 1902, the company merged with the Kyushu Railway Co., which extended the line to Kubota in 1903. The company was nationalised in 1907. From 1898 to 1912, a number of freight only branch lines were also built.

The Chikuhi Line from Higashi-Karatsu was extended to Yamamoto in 1929 on an alignment paralleling the east bank of the Matsuura River.

In 1983, the Chikuhi line was rebuilt so it branched at Karatsu, with the Karatsu - Nishi-Karatsu section being electrified at 1,500 V DC at the same time in conjunction with the electrification of the Chikuhi line, together with CTC signalling from Nishi-Karatsu to Kubota.

The last of the freight only branch lines closed in 1982. Freight services ceased in 1986.
