= Taku Station =

Railway station in Taku, Saga Prefecture, Japan

Taku Station 多久駅
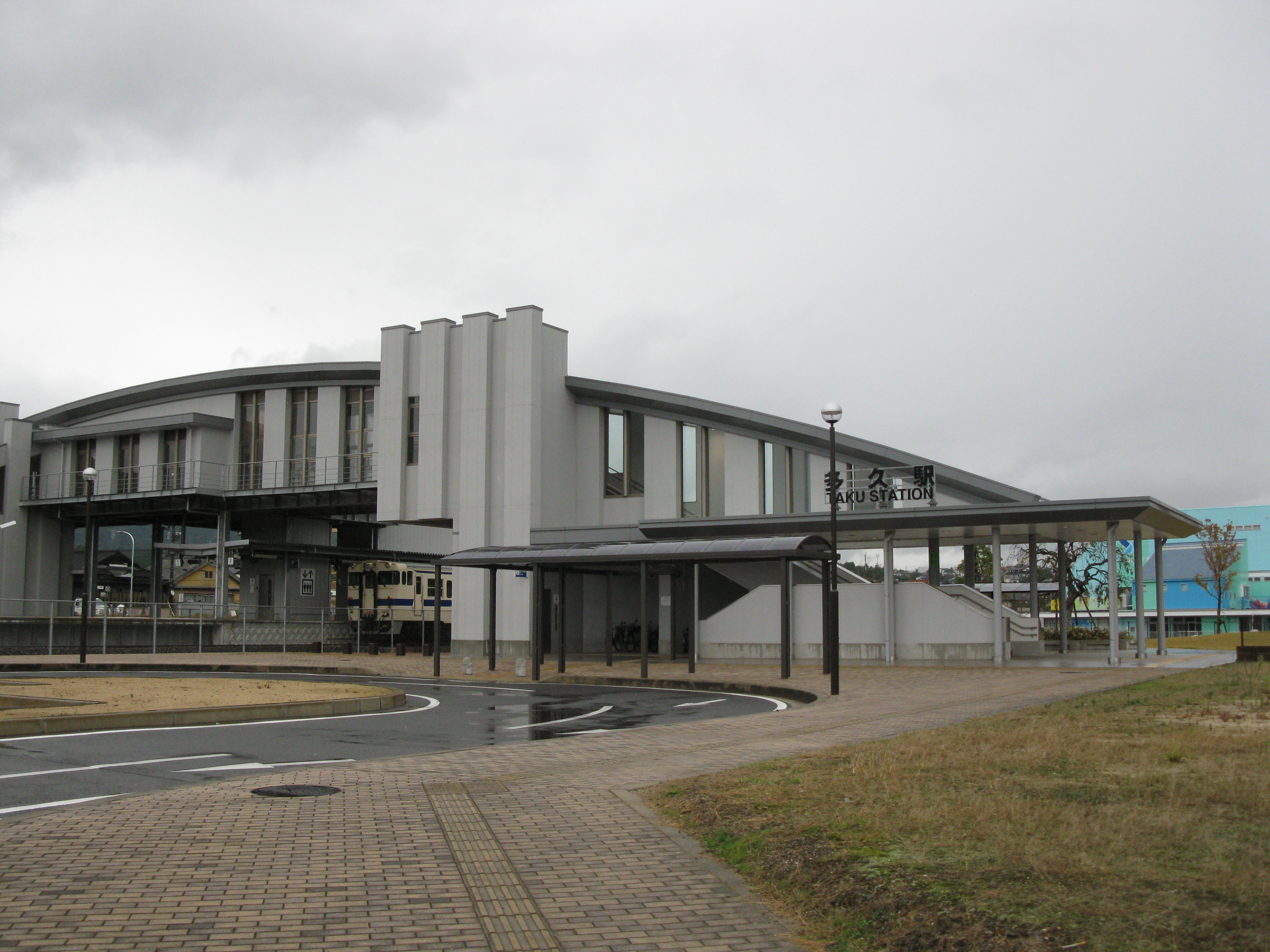
- The south entrance of Taku Station in 2009

General information
- Location: 1024 Kitatakumachi, Taku-shi, Saga-ken 846-0002; Japan
- Coordinates: 33°17′17″N 130°05′46″E
- Operator: JR Kyushu
- Line: JK Karatsu Line
- Distance: 15.2 km from Kubota
- Platforms: 1 island platform
- Tracks: 2

Construction
- Structure type: At grade

Other information
- Status: Staffed ticket window (outsourced)
- Website: Official website

History
- Opened: 25 December 1899
- Former names: Azamibaru (until 1 April 1934)

Passengers
- FY2020: 252 daily
- Rank: 299th (among JR Kyushu stations)

Services
Preceding station	JR Kyushu	Following station
Naka-Taku towards Kubota	Karatsu Line	Kyūragi towards Nishi-Karatsu
Location
- Location within Saga Prefecture Location within Japan

Taku Station (多久駅, Taku-eki) is a passenger railway station on the Karatsu Line operated by JR Kyushu located in the city of Taku, Saga Prefecture, Japan.

== Lines ==
The station is served by the Karatsu Line and is located 15.2 km from the starting point of the line at Kubota.

== Station layout ==
The station consists of an island platform serving two tracks. The station building is an elevated structure where the passenger facilities are placed on a bridge which spans the tracks. Besides giving access to the island platform, the second level of the bridge houses a waiting area and a ticket window. The bridge is also used as a free access for pedestrians to cross from the north side to the south side of the station. Next to the station are community facilities and shops.

Management of the station has been outsourced to the JR Kyushu Tetsudou Eigyou Co., a wholly owned subsidiary of JR Kyushu specialising in station services. It staffs the ticket window which is equipped with a POS machine but does not have a Midori no Madoguchi facility.

=== Platforms ===
1	■ JK Karatsu Line	for Karatsu and Nishi-Karatsu
2	■ JK Karatsu Line	for Ogi and Saga

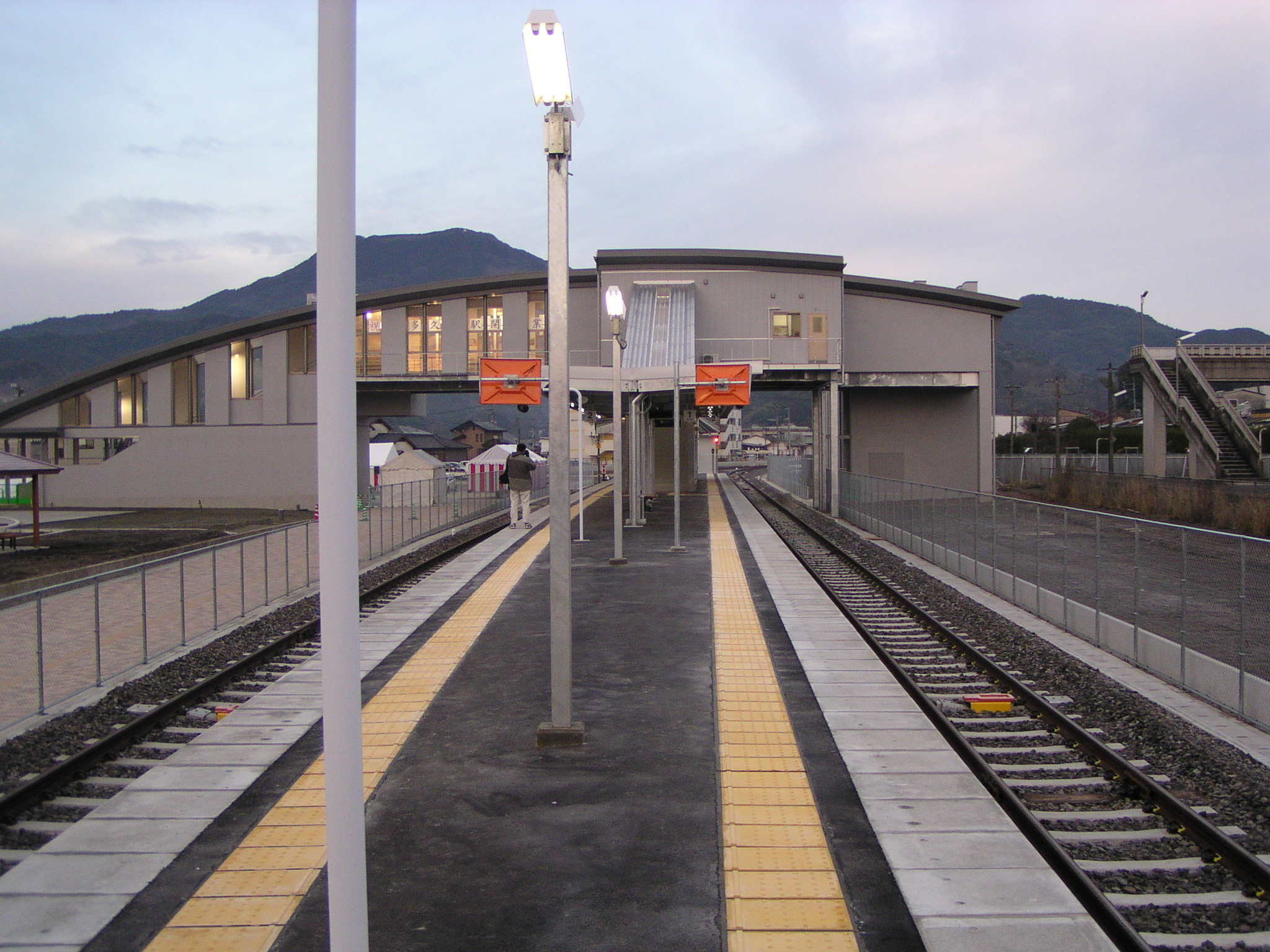
View of the platform in 2008. The south entrance is to the left. The area around the north entrance has not been built up yet.

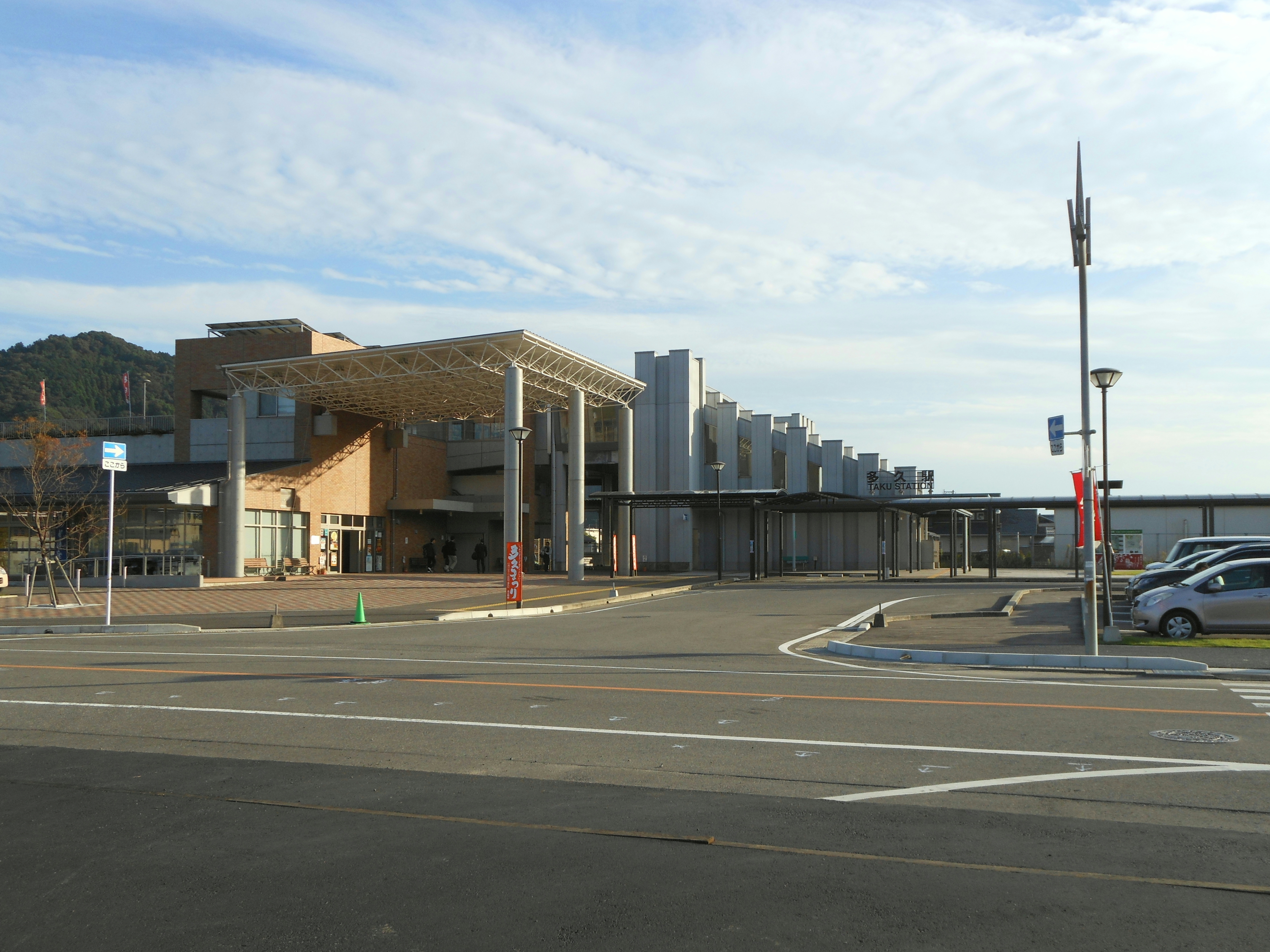
The north entrance in 2016 now built up. To the left are community facilities and shops which are not part of the station.

== History ==
The Karatsu Kogyo Railway had opened a track from Miyoken (now Nishi-Karatsu) which, by 13 June 1899, had reached Kyūragi. The track was extended further east, with Taku (at the time named Azamibaru Station (莇原駅) opening as the new eastern terminus on 25 December 1899. On 23 February 1902, the company, now renamed the Karatsu Railway, merged with the Kyushu Railway which undertook the next phase of expansion. Azamibaru became a through-station on 14 December 1903 when the track was extended to Kubota. When the Kyushu Railway was nationalized on 1 July 1907, Japanese Government Railways (JGR) took over control of the station. On 12 October 1909, the line which served the station was designated the Karatsu Line. On 1 April 1934, the station was renamed Taku. With the privatization of Japanese National Railways (JNR), the successor of JGR, on 1 April 1987, control of the station passed to JR Kyushu.

== Passenger statistics ==
In fiscal 2020, the station was used by an average of 252 passengers daily (boarding passengers only), and it ranked 299th among the busiest stations of JR Kyushu.

== Surrounding area ==
- Japan National Route 203
- Kita-Taku Post Office
- Midorigaoka Elementary School
- Taku Seibyō

== See also ==
- List of railway stations in Japan
