= Karatsu Station =

Railway station in Karatsu, Saga Prefecture, Japan

JK 20 Karatsu Station 唐津駅
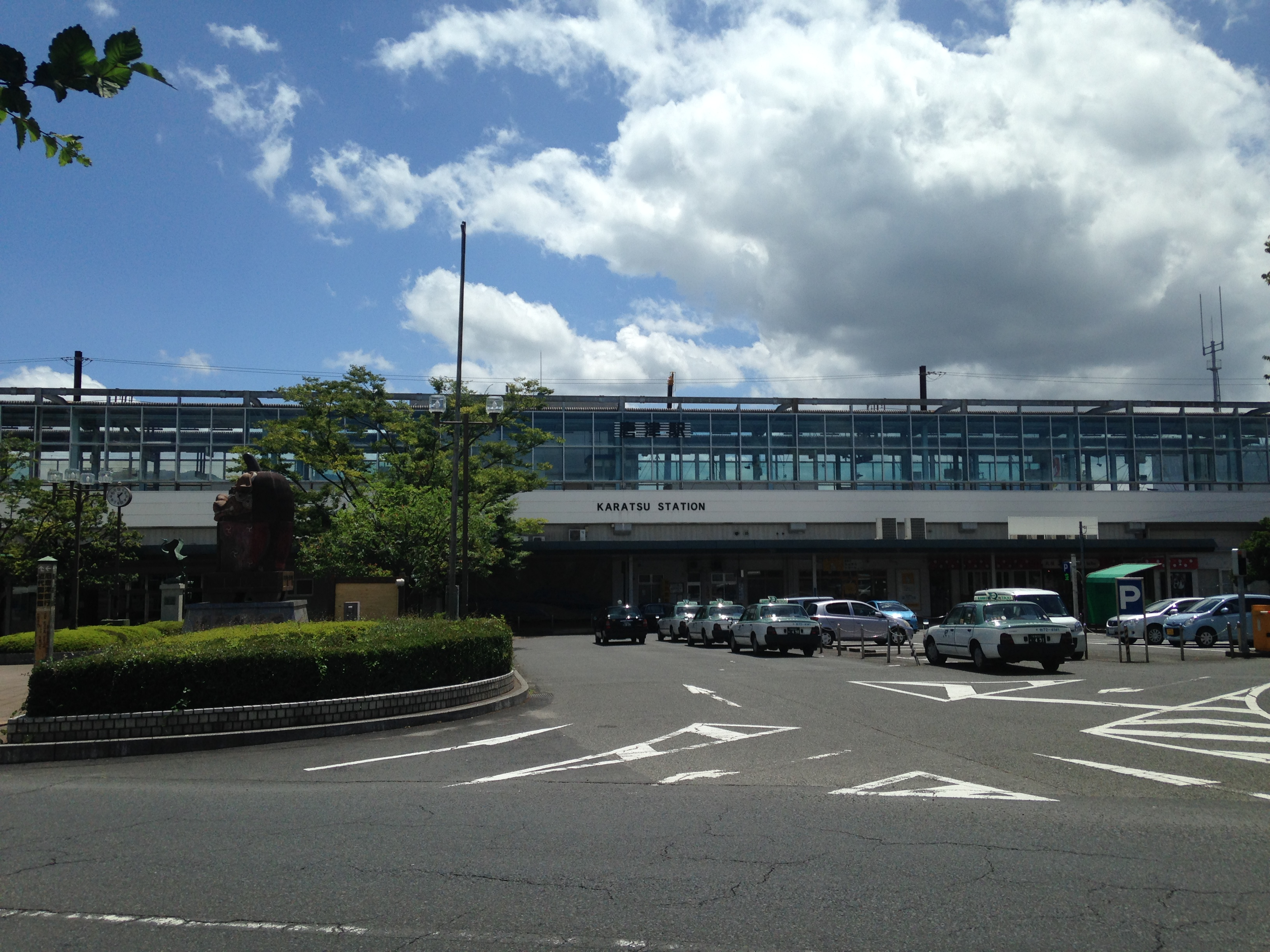
- North entrance of Karatsu Station in 2014

General information
- Location: Shinkomachi, Karatsu-shi, Saga-ken 847-0043; Japan
- Coordinates: 33°26′46″N 129°58′4″E
- Operator: JR Kyushu
- Line: JK Karatsu Line JK Chikuhi Line
- Distance: 42,6 km from Kubota
- Platforms: 2 island platforms
- Tracks: 4

Construction
- Structure type: Elevated
- Accessible: Yes

Other information
- Status: Staffed (Midori no Madoguchi )
- Website: Official website

History
- Opened: 1 December 1898; 127 years ago

Passengers
- FY2022: 1616 daily
- Rank: 89th (among JR Kyushu stations)

Services
| Preceding station | JR Kyushu | Following station |
|---|---|---|
| Onizuka towards Kubota | Karatsu Line | Nishi-Karatsu Terminus |
| Terminus | Chikuhi Line | Watada towards Meinohama |
Location
- Location within Saga Prefecture Location within Japan

Karatsu Station (唐津駅, Karatsu-eki) is a junction passenger railway station located in the city of Karatsu, Saga Prefecture, Japan. It is operated by JR Kyushu. It is the main station of Karatsu City.

== Lines ==
This station is served by the Karatsu Line, and is located 42.6 kilometers from the opposing terminus of the line at Kubota. It is the terminus of the Chikuhi Line, and is 42.6 kilometers from the opposing terminus of the line at Meinohama.

== Layout ==
The station has two elevated island platforms, with the station facilities underneath. This station is outsourced to JR Kyushu Service Support and a Midori no Madoguchi staffed ticket office.

=== Platforms ===
| 1,2, 3 | ■ JK Karatsu Line | for Nishi-Karatsu for Taku, Ogi |
| 1,2, 3 | ■ ■ Chikuhi Line (West) | for Imari |
| 3, 4 | ■ JK Chikuhi Line (East) | for Chikuzen-Maebaru and Meinohama |

== History ==
On 1 December 1898, the Karatsu Kogyo Railway opened Karatsu, with a line extending to Yamamoto. On 13 June 1899, the track was extended to Kyūragi. On 23 February 1902, the company, now renamed the Karatsu Railway, merged with the Kyushu Railway. When the Kyushu Railway was nationalized on 1 July 1907, Japanese Government Railways (JGR) took over control of the station. On 12 October 1909, the line which served the station was designated the Karatsu Line. With the privatization of Japanese National Railways (JNR), the successor of JGR, on 1 April 1987, control of the station passed to JR Kyushu.

== Passenger statistics ==
In fiscal 2020, the station was used by an average of 1616 passengers daily (boarding passengers only), and it ranked 89th among the busiest stations of JR Kyushu.

== Surrounding area ==
- Karatsu Castle
- Maizuru Park
- Hikiyama Exhibition Hall
- Showa Bus Ōteguchi Bus Center
- Saga Prefectural Karatsu Nishi High School

== See also ==
- List of railway stations in Japan
