= Kubota Station (Saga) =

Railway station in Saga, Saga Prefecture, Japan

Kubota Station 久保田駅
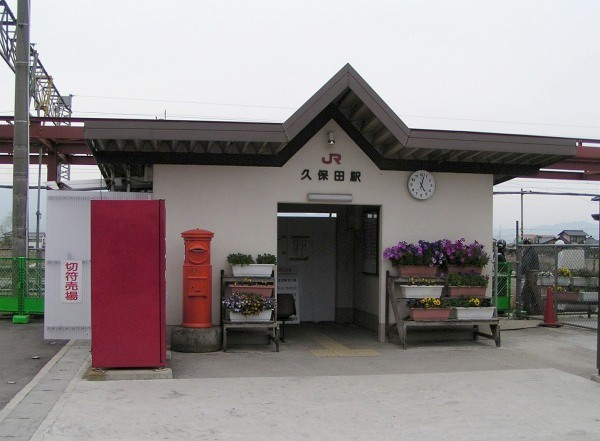
- Kubota Station in 2005

General information
- Location: Kubotacho Oaza Hisadomi, Saga-shi, Saga-ken, 849-0202
- Coordinates: 33°15′20.00″N 130°13′46.18″E
- Operator: JR Kyushu
- Lines: JH Nagasaki Main Line; JK Karatsu Line
- Distance: 31.4 km from Tosu (Nagasaki Main Line); 0.0 km (starting point of the Karatsu Line)
- Platforms: 1 side + 1 island platforms
- Tracks: 3 + 2 sidings

Construction
- Structure type: At grade
- Cycle facilities: Bike shed

Other information
- Status: Unstaffed
- Website: Official website

History
- Opened: October 10, 1896

Passengers
- FY2022: 485 daily
- Rank: 217th (among JR Kyushu stations)

Services
Preceding station	JR Kyushu	Following station
Ushizu towards Nagasaki	Nagasaki Line	Nabeshima towards Tosu
Ushizu towards Nagasaki	Nagasaki Line Seasonal	Balloon Saga towards Tosu
Terminus	Karatsu Line	Ogi towards Nishi-Karatsu
Location
- Location within Saga Prefecture Location within Japan

Kubota Station (久保田駅, Kubota-eki) is a junction passenger railway station located in the city of Saga, Saga Prefecture, Japan. It is operated by JR Kyushu.

== Lines ==
The station is served by the Nagasaki Main Line, located 31.4 km from the starting point of the line at Tosu and is also the eastern terminus of the 42.5 kilometer Karatsu Line to Nishi-Karatsu.

== Station layout ==
The station, which is unstaffed, consists of a side platform and an island platform serving three tracks. A small station building, of simple concrete construction, serves as a waiting room and houses an automatic ticket vending machine. Access to the opposite side platform is by means of a footbridge. Two sidings branch off track 1 and are used by track maintenance equipment. There is a stone monument in front of the station which claims that Kubota Station opened on 10 October 1896. A bike shed is located in front of the station.

=== Platforms ===
1	■ JH Nagasaki Main Line	for Isahaya and Nagasaki
1	■ JK Karatsu Line	for Karatsu and Nishi-Karatsu
2, 3	■ JH Nagasaki Main Line	for Saga and Tosu

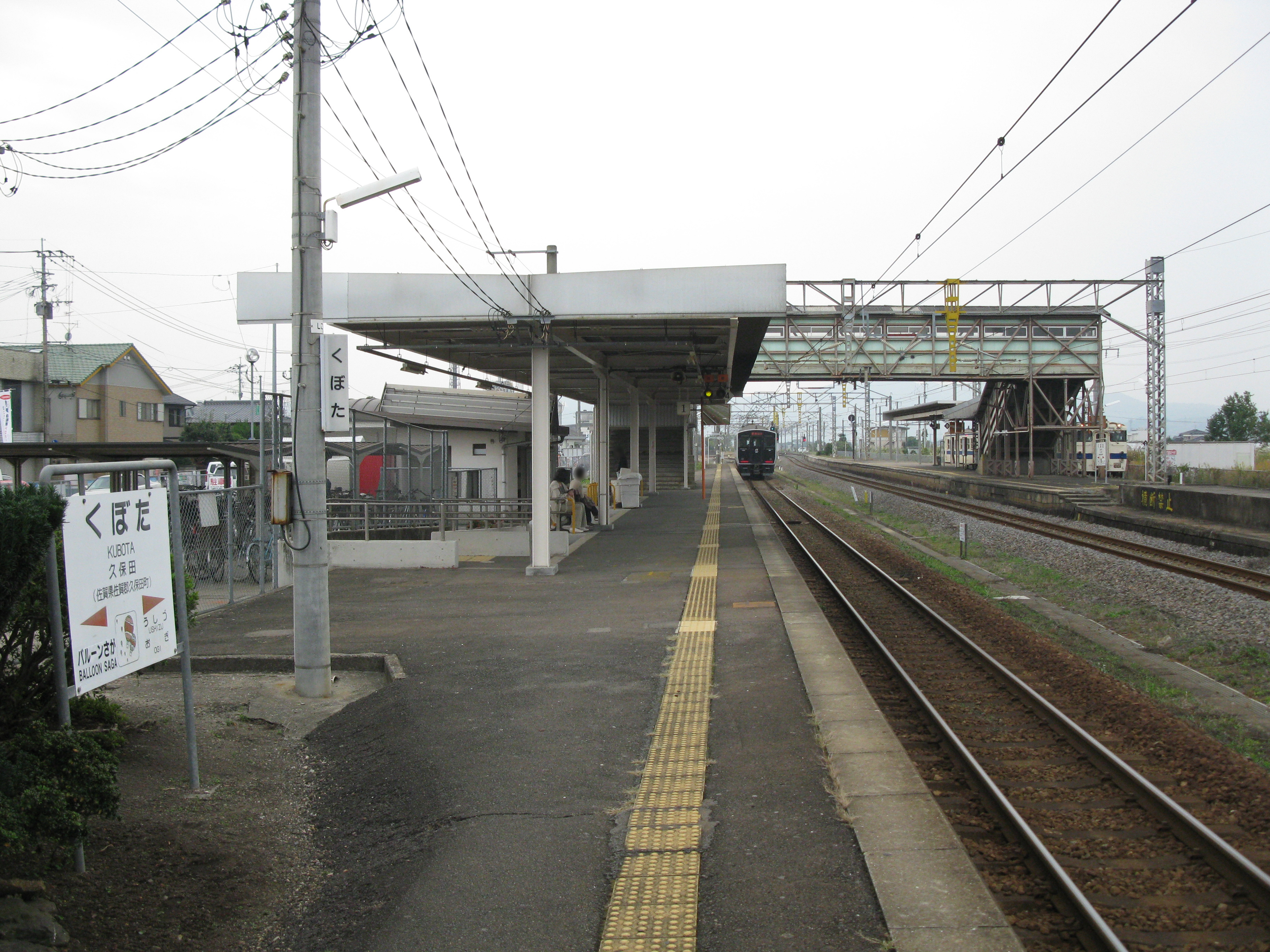
A view of the platforms and tracks.

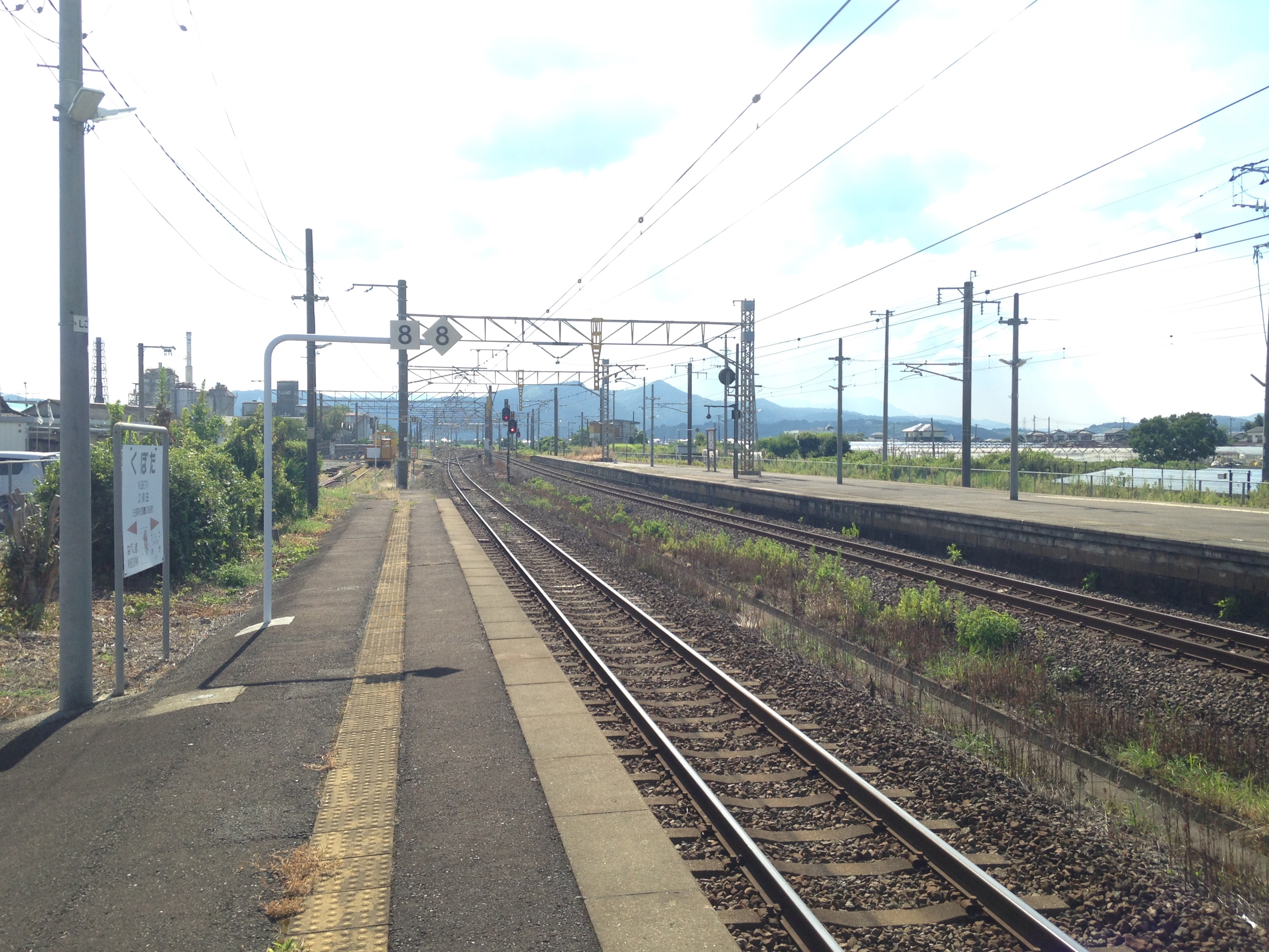
A view from platform 1. The sidings can be seen on the left.

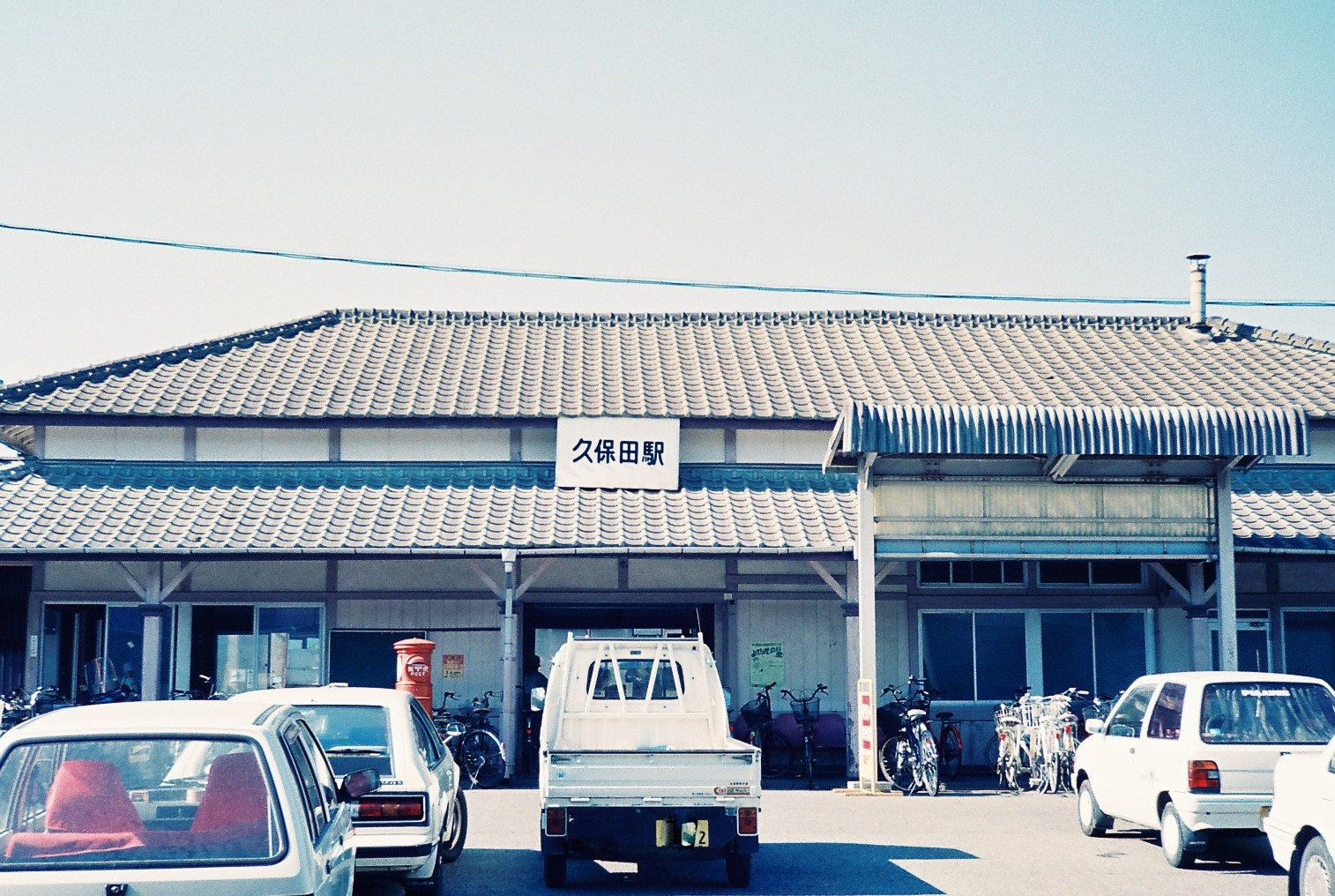
The old station building, as seen in 1990.

== History ==
The station was opened on 10 October 1896 by the private Kyushu Railway as an additional station on a stretch of track which, by 1895, it had laid from Tosu to Yamaguchi (today Kohoku) and Takeo (today Takeo-Onsen). On 14 December 1903, another stretch of track which the Kyushu Railway had acquired in 1902 between Miyoken (today Nishi-Karatsu) and Azamibaru (today Taku) was extended south and linked up at Kubota. When the Kyushu Railway was nationalized on 1 July 1907, Japanese Government Railways (JGR) took over control of the station. On 12 October 1909, the track to Yamaguchi became the Nagasaki Main Line while the track to Nishi-Karatsu became the Karatsu Line. With the privatization of Japanese National Railways (JNR), the successor of JGR, on 1 April 1987, control of the station passed to JR Kyushu.

== Passenger statistics ==
In fiscal 2020, the station was used by an average of 485 passengers daily (boarding passengers only), and it ranked 217th among the busiest stations of JR Kyushu.

== Surrounding area ==
- Japan National Route 34
- Japan National Route 207

== See also ==
- List of railway stations in Japan
