= Taku, Saga =

Taku 多久市
- City
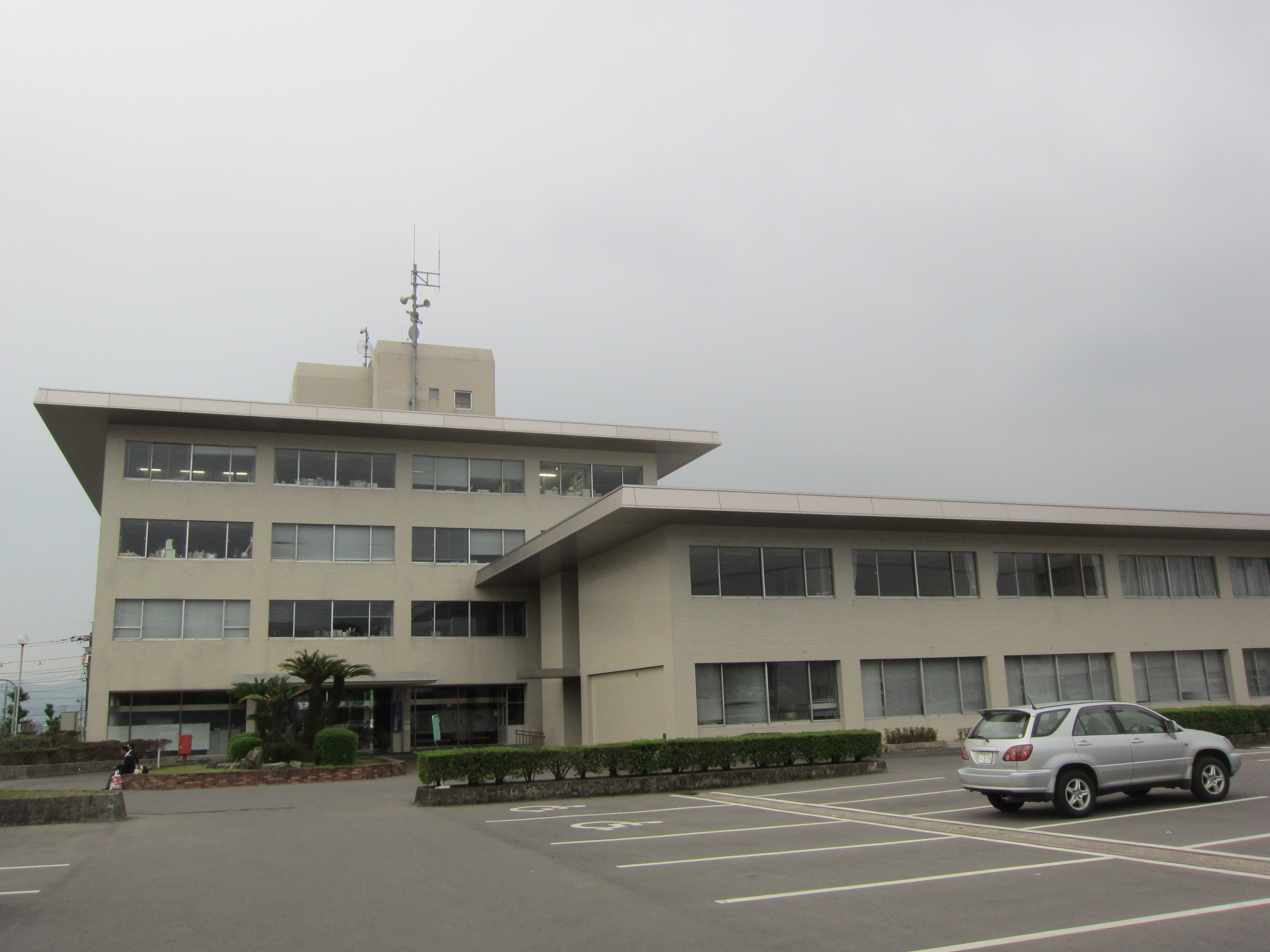
- Taku City Hall

- Flag Seal

- Location of Taku in Saga Prefecture
- Interactive map of Taku
- Location in Japan
- Coordinates: 33°17′19″N 130°6′37″E
- Country: Japan
- Region: Kyushu
- Prefecture: Saga Prefecture

Government
  - Mayor: Masanori Katsuki (香月正則), from September 2025

Area
  - Total: 96.56 km^{2} (37.28 sq mi)

Population (May 1, 2024)
  - Total: 17,807
  - Density: 184.4/km^{2} (477.6/sq mi)
- Time zone: UTC+09:00 (JST)
- City hall address: 7-1 Kozamurai, Kitataku-chō, Taku-shi, Saga-ken 846-8501
- Website: Official website
- Symbols
- Flower: Prunus mume
- Tree: Maple

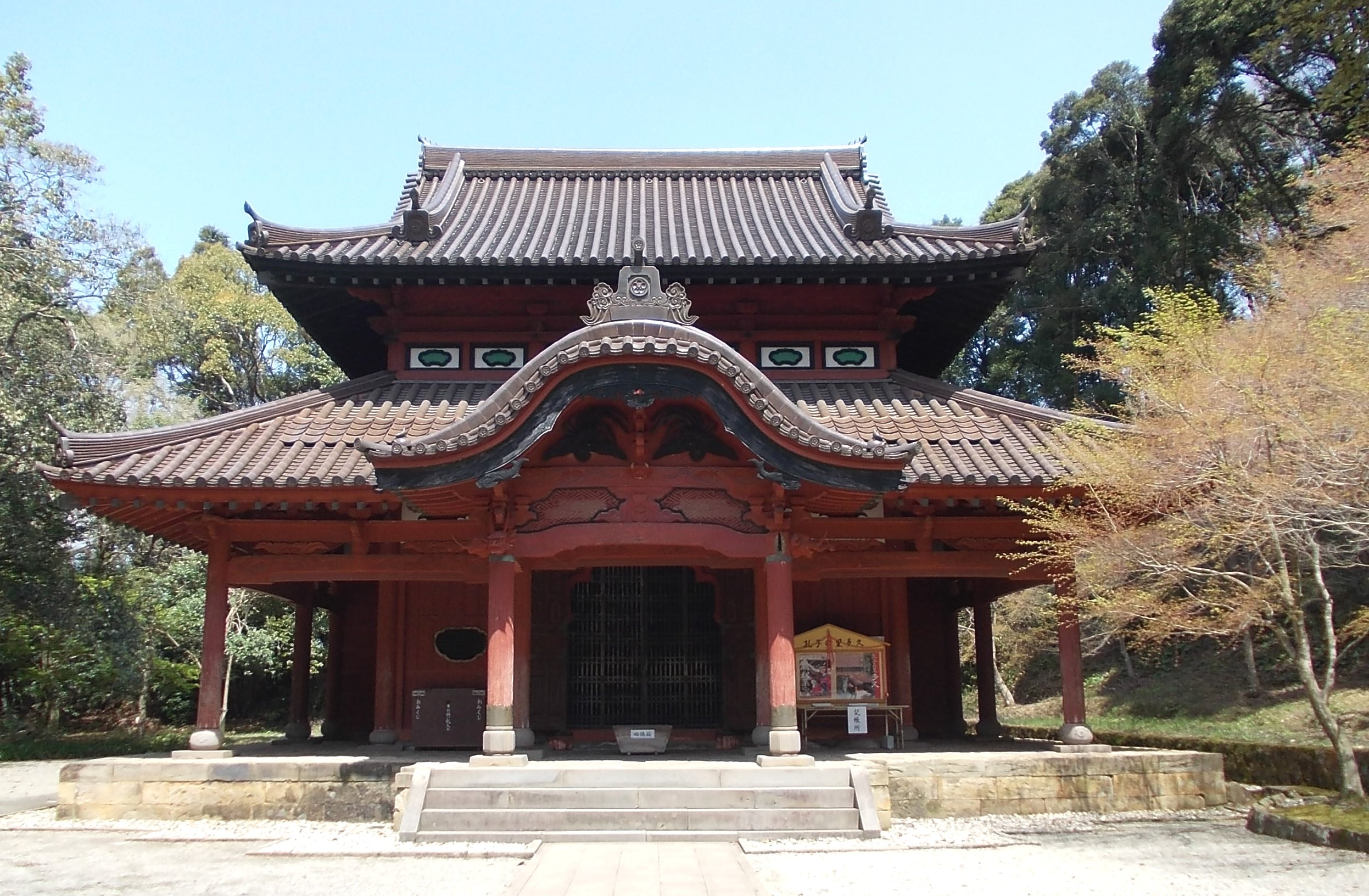
Taku Seibyo

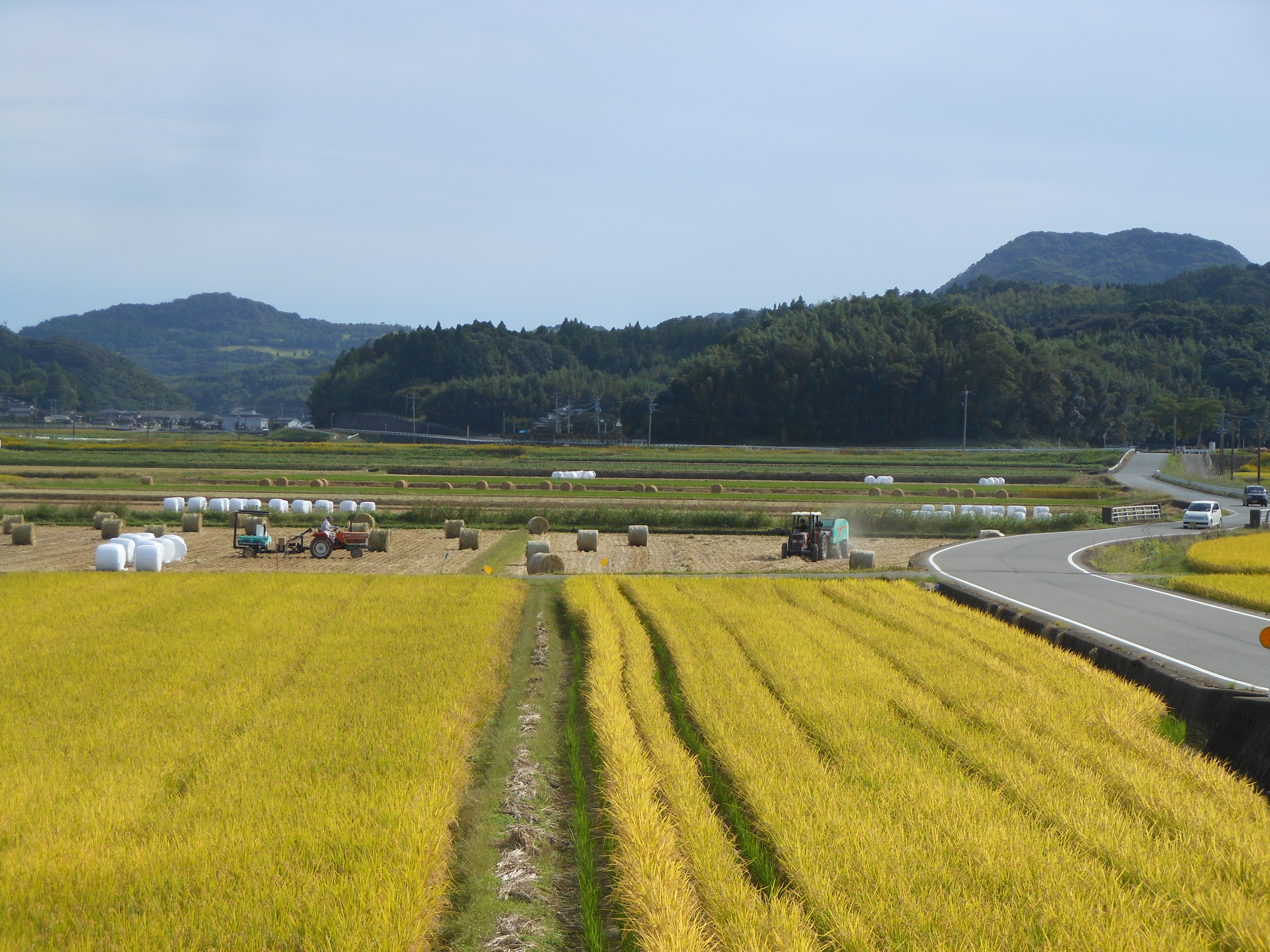
Landscape of southern Taku

Taku (多久市, Taku-shi) is a city located in Saga Prefecture on the island of Kyushu, Japan. As of 1 May 2024, the city had an estimated population of 17,807 in 7,912 households, and a population density of 180 persons per km^{2}. The total area of the city is 125.13 km^{2} (48.31 sq mi). Taku joined the UNESCO Global Network of Learning Cities in 2017.

== Geography ==
Taku is located about 25 kilometers west of Saga City, in a basin along the Ushizu River, with the urban center at the center. Although it is surrounded by mountains, there is flat land to the east and low passes connect it to other directions.

=== Adjoining municipalities ===
Saga Prefecture

- Karatsu
- Kōhoku
- Ogi
- Ōmachi
- Saga
- Takeo

=== Climate ===
Taku has a humid subtropical climate (Köppen Cfa) characterized by warm summers and cool winters with light to no snowfall. The average annual temperature in Taku is 15.5 °C. The average annual rainfall is 1864 mm with September as the wettest month. The temperatures are highest on average in August, at around 26.5 °C, and lowest in January, at around 5.0 °C.

=== Demographics ===
Per Japanese census data, the population of Taku is as shown below.

Historical population
Year	Pop.	±%
1940	19,882	—
1950	37,787	+90.1%
1960	45,627	+20.7%
1970	26,785	−41.3%
1980	25,636	−4.3%
1990	25,162	−1.8%
2000	23,949	−4.8%
2010	21,412	−10.6%
2020	18,295	−14.6%

== History ==
The area of Taku was part of ancient Hizen Province. During the Edo period it was mostly was part of Saga Domain. Following the Meiji restoration, the villages of Kita-Taku, Taku, Nishi-Taku, Higashi-Taku, and Minami-Taku were established with the creation of the modern municipalities system. Kita-Taku was raised to town status on April 1, 1949. These municipalities merged on May 1, 1954 to form the city of Taku.

== Government ==
Taku has a mayor-council form of government with a directly elected mayor and a unicameral city council of 15 members. Taku contributes two members to the Saga Prefectural Assembly. In terms of national politics, the city is part of the Saga 2nd district of the lower house of the Diet of Japan.

== Economy ==
The area of Taku was formerly a coal mining area with many companies operating mines; however, the last mine closed in 1972, bringing an end to the coal industry. Taking advantage of its location near the Nagasaki Expressway, the city is trying to revive as an industrial location.

== Education ==
Taku has three public combined elementary/junior high schools operated by the city government and one public high school operated by the Saga Prefectural Board of Education.

== Transport ==
=== Railway ===
JR Kyushu - Karatsu Line

JK * Higashi-Taku - Naka-Taku - Taku

=== Highways ===
- Nagasaki Expressway (Taku IC, Taku-Nishi PA)
- National Route 203

== Sister cities ==
- Qufu, Shandong, China

== Local attractions ==
- Taku Seibyō is a Confucian temple built in 1708. It is one of the oldest Confucian temples in Japan and has been designated as a National Historic Site and National Important Cultural Property.

== Notable people from Taku ==
- Machiko Hasegawa - One of the first female manga artists.
