= Nishi-Karatsu Station =

Railway station in Karatsu, Saga Prefecture, Japan

JK 21 Nishi-Karatsu Station 西唐津駅
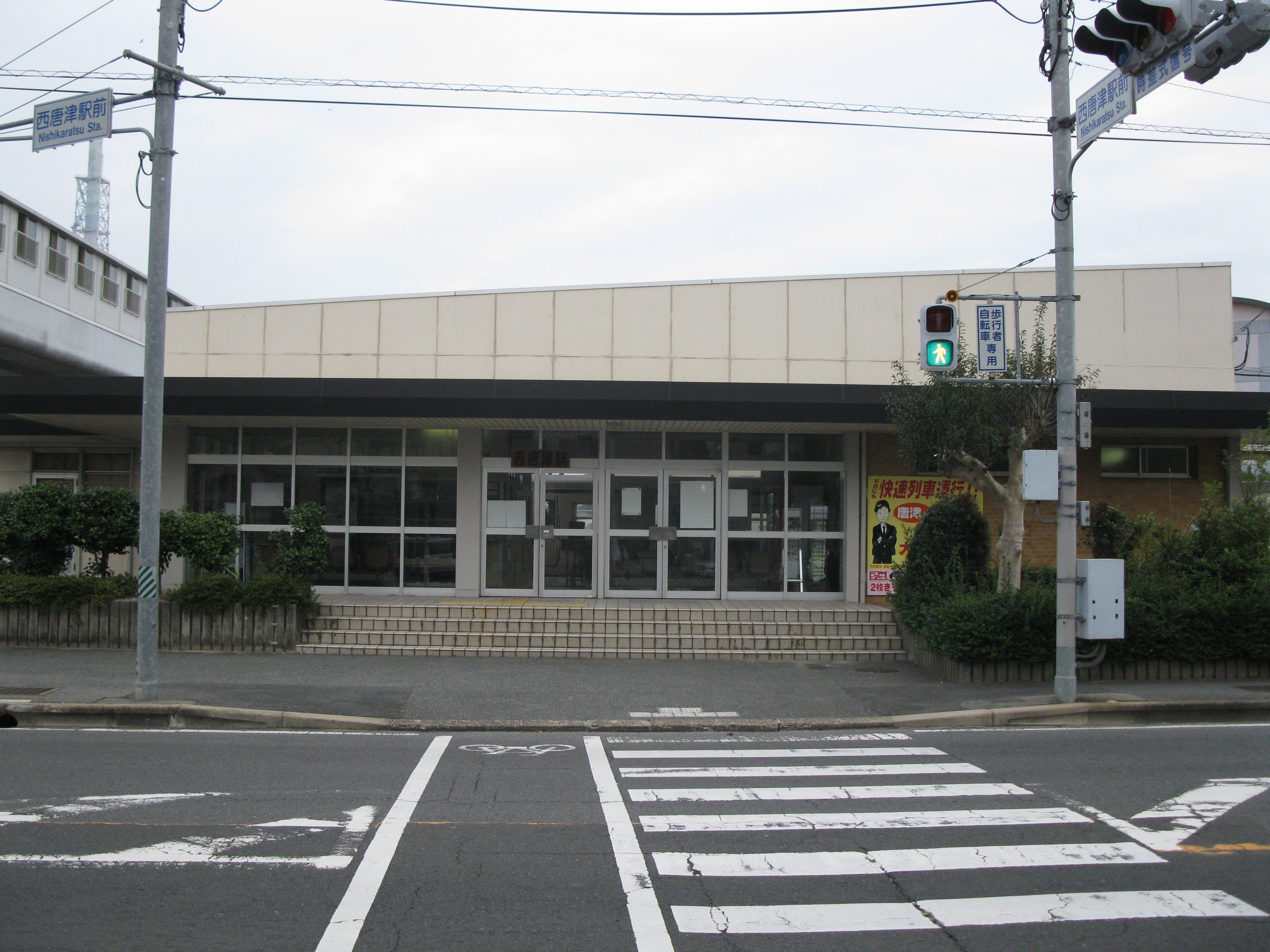
- Nishi-Karatsu Station in 2019

General information
- Location: 2-chōme-1 Futago, Karatsu-shi, Saga-ken 847-0861; Japan
- Coordinates: 33°27′42.44″N 129°57′26.05″E
- Operator: JR Kyushu
- Line: JK Karatsu Line
- Distance: 43.5 km from Kubota
- Platforms: 1 side platform
- Tracks: 1

Construction
- Structure type: At-grade
- Accessible: No

Other information
- Status: Unstaffed
- Station code: JK21
- Website: Official website

History
- Opened: December 1, 1898
- Former names: Myōken (until 1905)

Passengers
- FY2022: 381 daily
- Rank: 247th (among JR Kyushu stations)

Services
Preceding station	JR Kyushu	Following station
Karatsu JK 20 towards Kubota	Karatsu Line	Terminus
Terminus	Chikuhi Line	Karatsu JK 20 towards Meinohama
Location
- Location within Saga Prefecture Location within Japan

Nishi-Karatsu Station (西唐津駅, Nishi-Karatsu-eki) is a junction passenger railway station located in the city of Karatsu, Saga Prefecture, Japan. It is operated by Kyushu Railway Company (JR Kyushu).

This station is the terminus of the Karatsu Line, and is located 43.5 kilometers from the opposing terminus of the line at Kubota. It is also used by trains from the Chikuhi Line, which continue from the nominal terminus of the line at Karatsu using the tracks of the Karatsu Line for an additional 2.2 kilometers to terminate here.

== Layout ==
The station has only one ground-level side platform, but the premises are large and there are two side tracks without platforms and many sidings. The Karatsu Line is only electrified between Karatsu Station and this station. The station is unattended.

== History ==
On 1 December 1898, the Karatsu Kogyo Railway opened Myōken Station (妙見駅, Myōken-eki), with a line extending to Yamamoto. On 13 June 1899, the track was extended to Kyūragi. On 23 February 1902, the company, now renamed the Karatsu Railway, merged with the Kyushu Railway. The station was renamed to its present name on 11 October 1911. When the Kyushu Railway was nationalized on 1 July 1907, Japanese Government Railways (JGR) took over control of the station. On 12 October 1909, the line which served the station was designated the Karatsu Line. With the privatization of Japanese National Railways (JNR), the successor of JGR, on 1 April 1987, control of the station passed to JR Kyushu.

== Surrounding area ==
- JR Kyushu Karatsu Railway Division Karatsu transportation center
- Nishi-Karatsu Post Office
- Karatsu Police Station
- Kyushu Electric Power Karatsu Thermal power station

== Passenger statistics ==
In fiscal 2020, the station was used by an average of 381 passengers daily (boarding passengers only), and it ranked 247th among the busiest stations of JR Kyushu.

== See also ==
- List of railway stations in Japan
