= List of mergers in Saga Prefecture =

Here is a list of mergers in Saga Prefecture, Japan since the Heisei era.

== Mergers from April 1, 1999 to Present ==
- On January 1, 2005 - the towns of Ariake and Fukudomi (both from Kishima District) were merged into the expanded town of Shiroishi.
- On January 1, 2005 - the old city of Karatsu absorbed the towns of Chinzei, Hamatama, Hizen, Kyūragi, Ōchi and Yobuko. and the village of Kitahata (all from Higashimatsuura District) to create the new and expanded city of Karatsu. (Merger Information Page)
- On March 1, 2005 - the former town of Ogi absorbed the towns of Ashikari, Mikatsuki and Ushizu (all from Ogi District) to create the city of Ogi. Ogi District was dissolved as a result of this merger.
- On March 1, 2005 - the towns of Kitashigeyasu, Mine and Nakabaru (all from Miyaki District) were merged to create the town of Miyaki.
- On October 1, 2005 - the old city of Saga absorbed the towns of Fuji, Morodomi and Yamato (all from Saga District) and the village of Mitsuse (from Kanzaki District) to create the new and expanded city of Saga.
- On January 1, 2006 - the former town of Ureshino absorbed the town of Shiota (both from Fujitsu District) to create the city of Ureshino.
- On January 1, 2006 - the village of Nanayama (from Higashimatsuura District) was merged into the expanded city of Karatsu.
- On March 1, 2006 - the old city of Takeo absorbed the towns of Kitagata and Yamauchi (both from Kishima District) to create the new and expanded city of Takeo.
- On March 1, 2006 - the town of Nishiarita (from Nishimatsuura District) was merged into the expanded town of Arita.
- On March 1, 2006 - the towns of Mitagawa, and the village of Higashisefuri (both from Kanzaki District) were merged to create the town of Yoshinogari.
- On March 20, 2006 - the former town of Kanzaki absorbed the town of Chiyoda, and the village of Sefuri (all from Kanzaki District) to create the city of Kanzaki. With this merger, there are no more villages left in Saga Prefecture.
- On October 1, 2007 - the towns of Higashiyoka, Kawasoe, and Kubota (all from Saga District) were all merged into the expanded city of Saga. Saga District was dissolved as a result of this merger.
