= Mud sledge =

Conveyance across mud flats

Fishing the Dollart mud flats in 1951

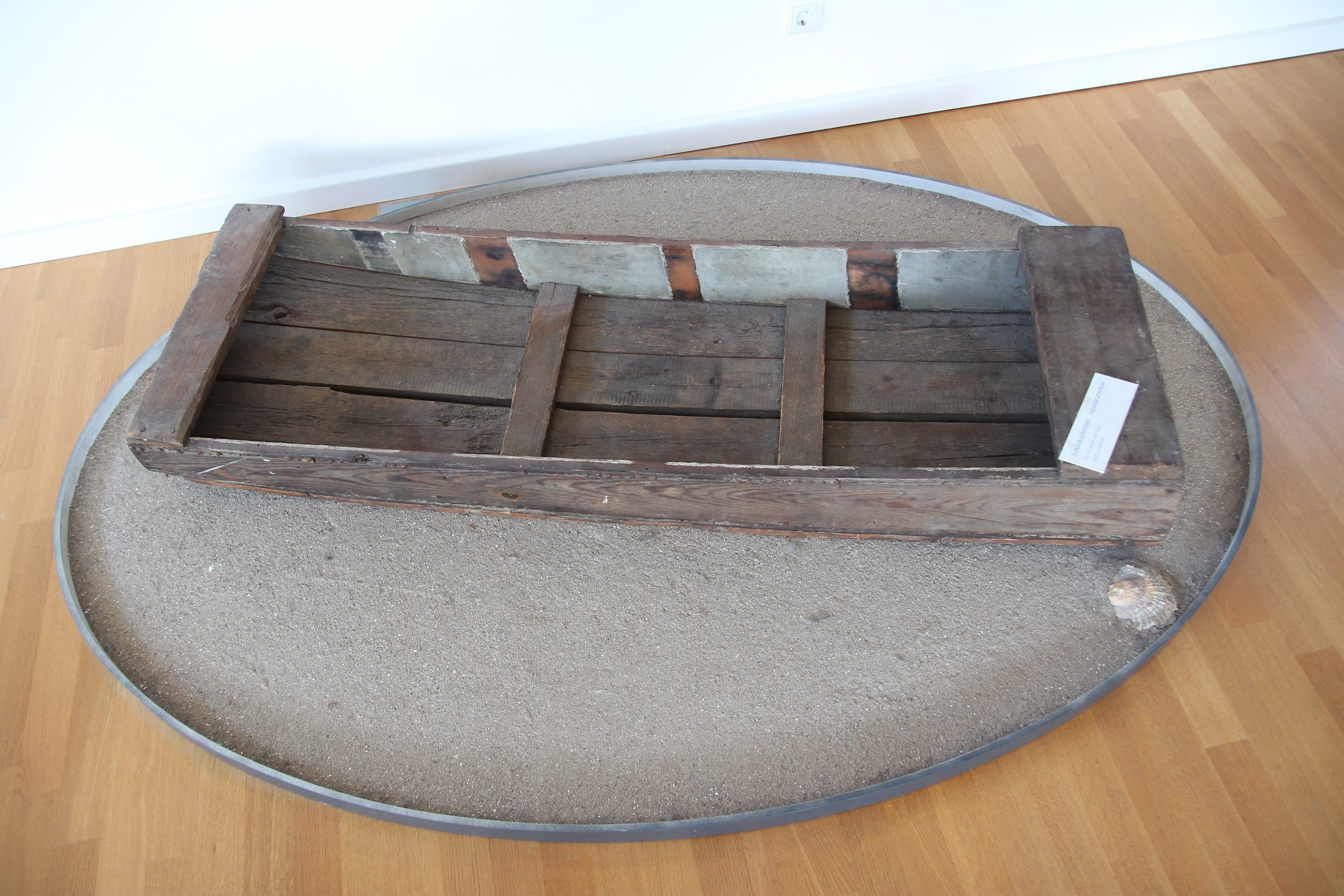
In a German museum

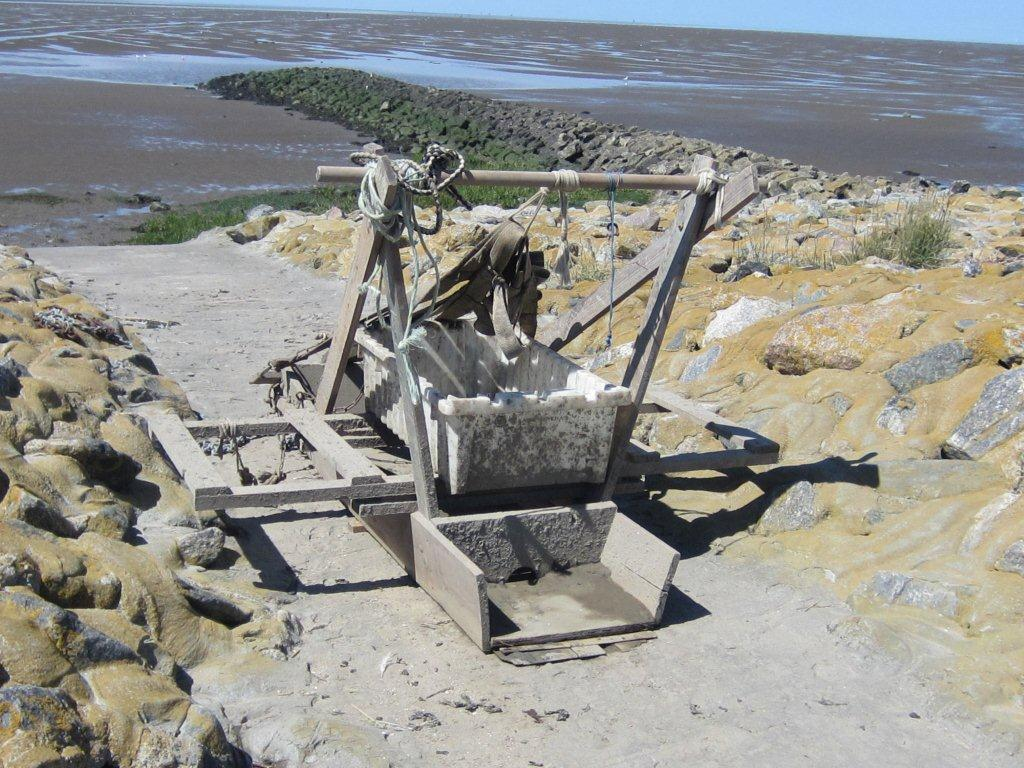
A German mud sledge

A mud sledge is a sled used to cross mud flats such as estuaries and bays.

Mud flats are difficult to cross because even shallow draft boats will get stuck while pedestrians and wheeled vehicles bog down easily too. A mud sledge is a traditional device used by fishermen when they collect from nets, pots and traps which they set out in tidal waters. The traditional designs vary but, typically, they have a flat wooden base and are propelled by scooting with one or both legs.

Traditional fishing in this way has declined in modern industrial countries, but the sledges may still be used for races and sport.

== England ==
Fishing in the mudflats of the Bristol Channel was traditionally done using a mud horse, a traditional type of hand-built wooden sledge used for fishing in Bridgwater Bay. As of 2010 the only remaining mud-horse fisherman was fifth generation fisherman Adrian Sellick. His father, Brendan, was still selling the catch from Mudhorse Cottage in Stolford. As of 2019 the family was still using this technique. The technique of the Sellick family, which did this for generations, was to bend over the table-like horse and push from behind using both legs.

== Germany ==
There are many names for a mud sledge in the various German dialects including Creier, Kraaite, Kraite, Kreier, Kreyer, Schlickrutscher. Schusch, Slykslide and Wattschlitten.

Races with mud sledges (Schlikschlittenrennen) take place in German villages including Dangast, Dyksterhusen, Pilsum, Pogum and Upleward-Greetsiel.

== Japan ==
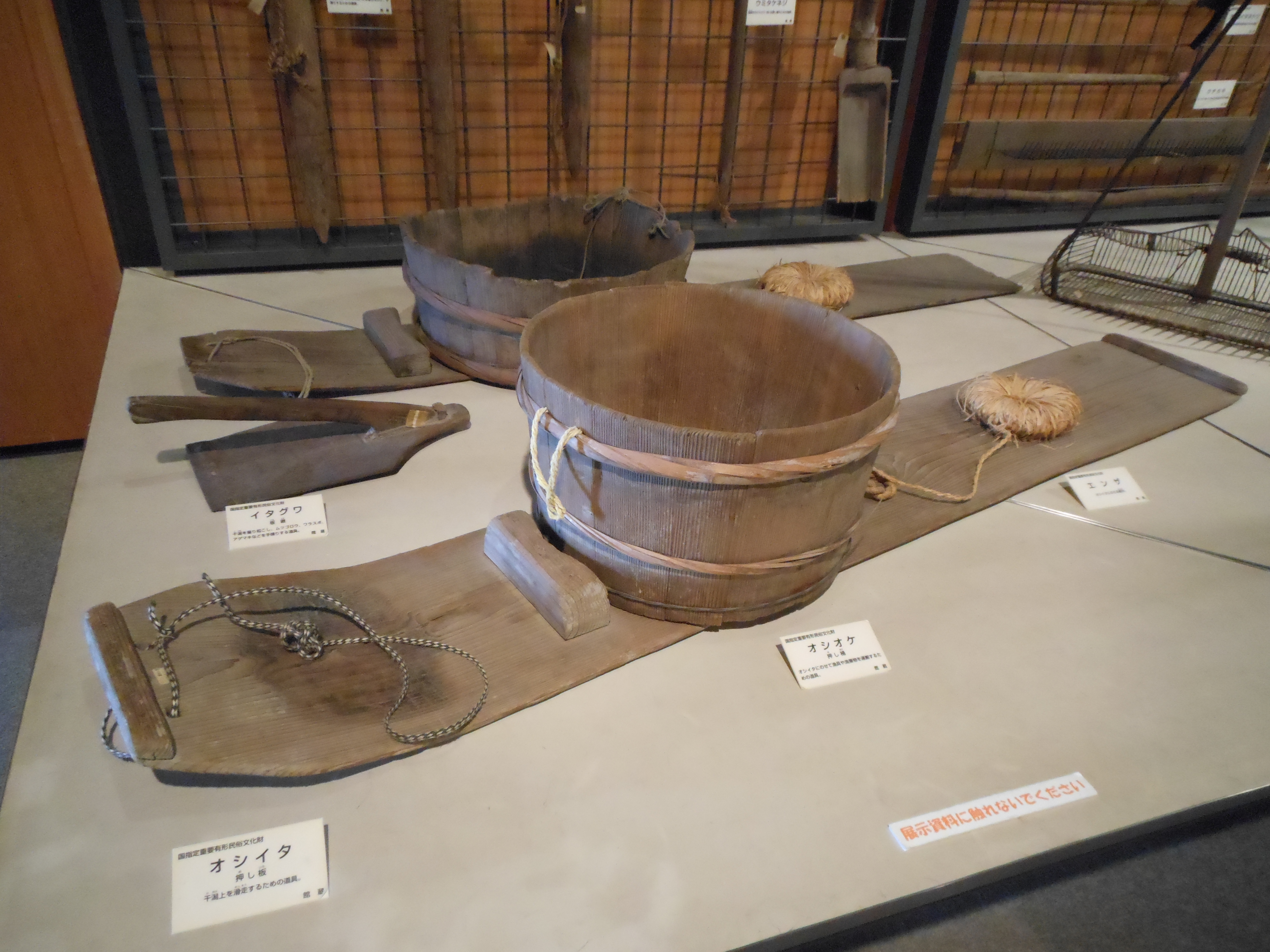
A mud sledge in western Japan

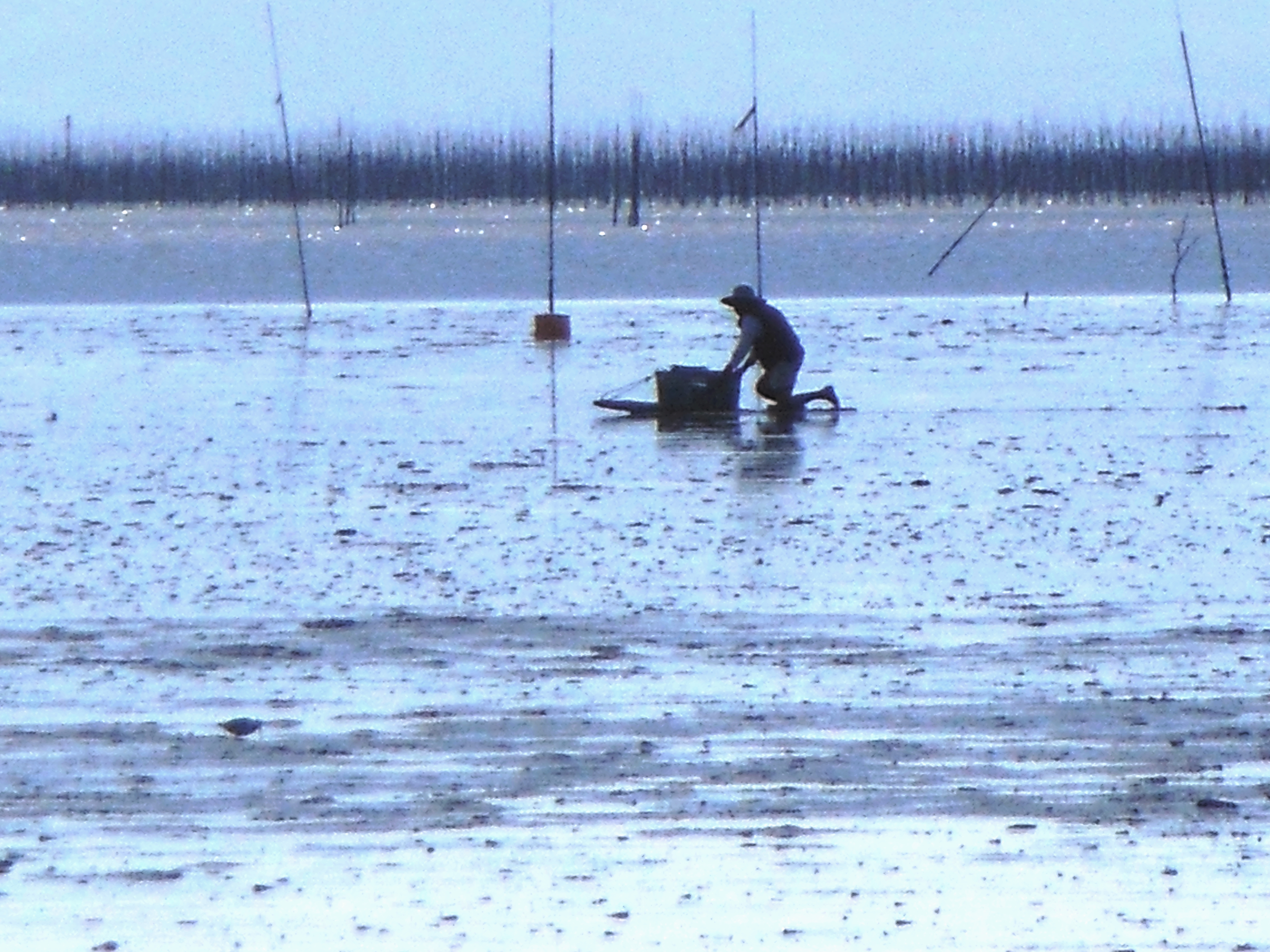
A Japanese mud sledge being used to collect seafood on the Higashiyoka-higata tidal flat.

Mud sledges are used in Japan where they are called gataita or haneita. Similar sledges are observed also in South Korea.

== Korea ==
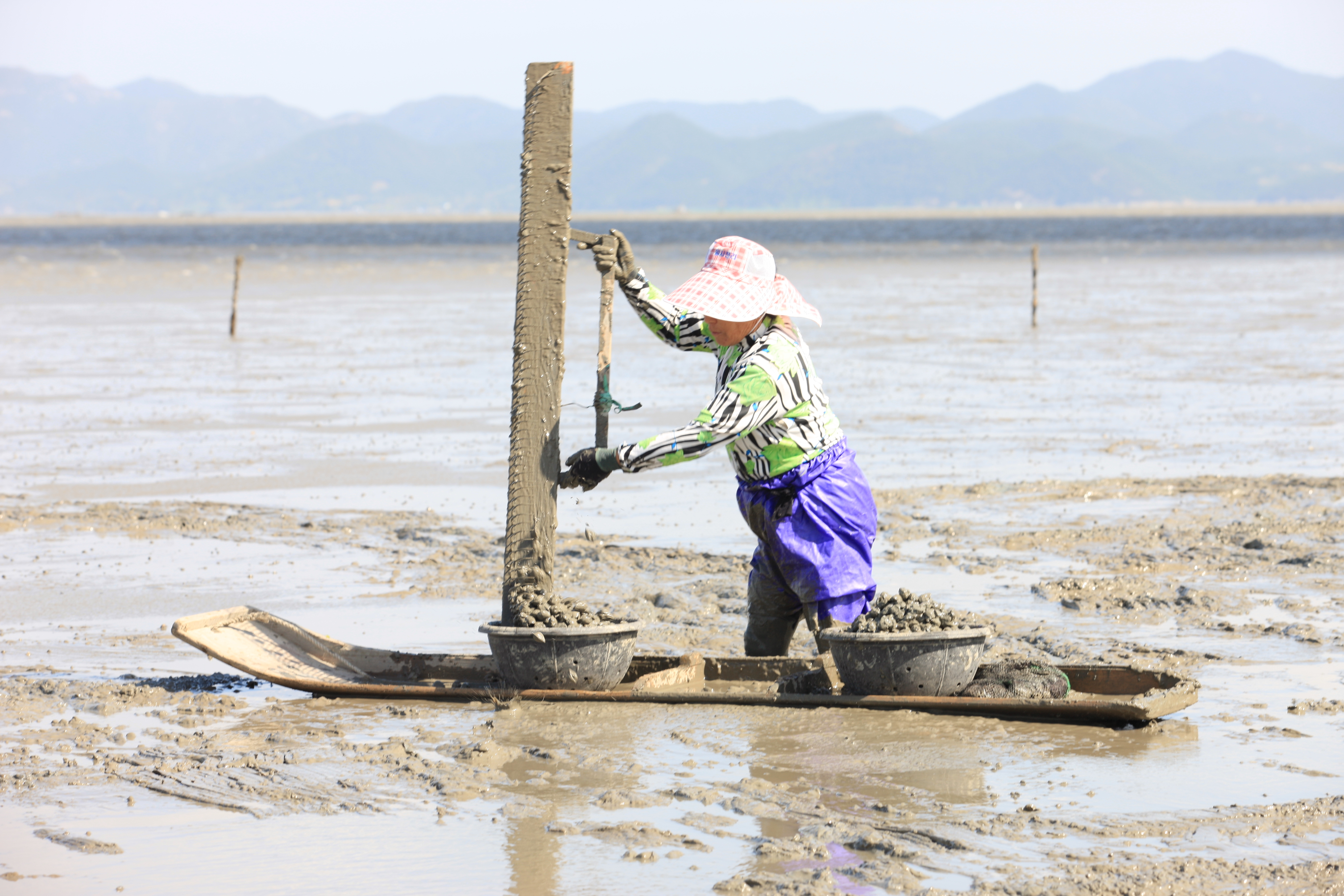
Korean fisher using a Sseorae to move Blood Clams onto her mud sledge

Mud sledges are commonly used in the mudflats of western Korean peninsula. They go by the name of Bbeolbae, Bbeolcha and Neolbae. The shape and size of the sledge varies slightly depending on where it's used and what it's meant to catch. They are accompanied by various tools such as the Sseorae, a large, comb-like tool used specifically to catch Blood Clams hidden in the mud. When not in use, these sledges are stored in a Dumbung, an artificial pond made near the coast where fishermen wash their mud off.

For people living near the flats, it would be normal for each household to possess one Bbeolcha of their own. While they are still in use today, recent industrialization has caused a decline in the use of such traditional methods. Nowadays, areas such as Boseong County promote mud sledge racing as recreational activity for tourists.

== China ==
Mud sledges are widely used on intertidal zones along the East China Sea in mainland China, including Macau.

== Southeast Asia ==
In Vietnam, Thailand, and Malaysia, mud sledges are found. In Indonesia, around Surabaya of eastern Java as well as on immense muddy tidal zones at eastern Sumatra, mud sledges are ubiquitously ranged.

== See also ==
- Dog sled
- Mud bogging
