= Genkai Nuclear Power Plant =

Nuclear power plant in Japan

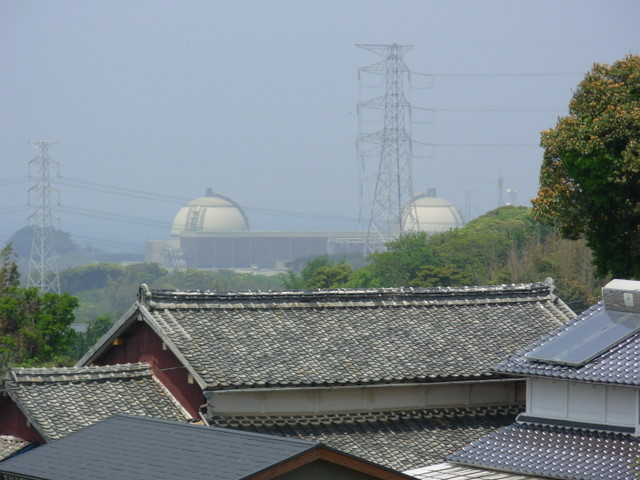
- Genkai Nuclear Power Plant (in the distance)
- Country: Japan
- Coordinates: 33°30′56″N 129°50′14″E
- Status: Operational
- Construction began: September 15, 1971
- Commission date: October 15, 1975
- Owner: Kyūshū Electric Power Company
- Operator: Kyushu Electric Power Company

Nuclear power station
- Reactor type: PWR
- Cooling source: Korea Strait

Power generation
- Units operational: 1 x 559 MW; 2 x 1180 MW
- Units decommissioned: 1 x 559 MW
- Nameplate capacity: 2,919 MW
- Capacity factor: 82.1%
- Annual net output: 21,000 GW·h

External links
- Website: www1.kyuden.co.jp/genkai_index
- Commons: Related media on Commons

The Genkai Nuclear Power Plant (玄海原子力発電所, Genkai genshiryoku hatsudensho; Genkai NPP) is located in the town of Genkai in the Higashimatsuura District in the Saga Prefecture in Japan. It is owned and operated by the Kyūshū Electric Power Company.

The reactors were all built by Mitsubishi Heavy Industries and are of the 2 and 4-loop M type pressurized water reactor. Unit 3 has been selected as a special Plutonium fuel test case. The plant is on a site with a total of 0.87 square kilometers. Saga does not lie on a fault line and receives the fewest earthquakes in Japan.

== History ==
=== 2011 restart, controversy and reclosure ===
In early 2011, Units 2 and 3 were suspended for routine maintenance. Following the Tohoku earthquake, Kyushu Electric voluntarily sought reapproval with the town of Genkai and Saga prefecture to make sure that there would be no objection to turning the reactors back on. Negotiations extended several months past the normal restart time. Because Units 2 and 3 were not restarted for the summer, Kyushu was expected to have an electricity shortage and only be able to meet 85% of normal summer needs.

After the mayor of Genkai extended his approval, the larger consensus of Saga prefecture was sought. A meeting was organized to inform the people in the district and to get permission to restart the reactors. The meeting was broadcast live on TV and the internet, and viewers were invited to submit their opinions by e-mail or fax. Later, the Japanese Communist Party paper Akahata learned that the board of the Kyushu Electric Power Company had requested employees of the plant to send emails to this meeting encouraging the restart. Later it was admitted that not only employees of the utility but the workers of 4 affiliated firms too, more than 1,500 people in total, received such requests.

At the same time as this crisis broke, Prime Minister Naoto Kan unexpectedly requested more stress tests of the reactor. This seemed to imply, despite the earlier assurances of the national government, that the routine maintenance and additional post-earthquake tests had not been sufficient to clear the reactors for restart, and that the mayor of Genkai had therefore approved the restart without complete information about the reactors' safety. As a result, the mayor rescinded his approval. The governor of Saga, who had not yet given his approval, also expressed surprise. Chief Cabinet Secretary Yukio Edano flew to Saga prefecture immediately to apologize to the governor in person. On July 9, Kan also apologized.

On 2 November 2011 the No. 4 reactor, the newest model, was restarted. The reactor was the first in Japan to resume operations after the March accident at Fukushima Daiichi nuclear plant. In December the reactor was stopped again for a regular inspection.

On 9 December 2011 a leak was discovered in the cooling system of reactor No. 3. An alarm was triggered when the temperature rose to over 80C at the base of one of the pumps, but this alarm did not indicate the leakage of 1.8 cubic meters of radioactive water, because the water did not go outside the purification system. After the leak was discovered Kyushu Electric failed to report the troubles in full to the local government. Only the failure of the pumps in the system for the No. 3 reactor were mentioned.

As of September 2012, Saga prefecture was aiming to have the Genkai reactors permanently retired after 40 years of operation, meaning that reactor 1 would close in 2015. A citizens' group sued to have the reactors shut down immediately, but the state argued that there is no process in Japanese law that could cause an industry's operations to cease through a civil, rather than criminal, action.

In February 2019 the Kyūshū Electric Power Company announced that unit 2 would be decommissioned ahead of its 40-year end of life in 2021, alongside the already agreed decommissioning of unit 1. Neither unit had operated since 2011.

=== Units 3 and 4 restart ===
On 19 January 2017, units 3 and 4 received from NRA the confirmation of meeting the new regulatory standards. In February the town council voted in favor of re-running. In March, the Mayor, Tohru Kishimoto confirmed at a press conference approval to restart. The Mayor asked that storage of spent nuclear fuel in the same nuclear plant would be limited in time as possible. The Mayor stated that the restart is expected in summer as the early date.

On 23 March 2018 unit 3 was restarted after seven years out of production. The reactor was briefly shut down again only a week later, due to a steam leakage. According to the owner Kyushu Electric Power of the reactor there had been no radioactive pollution emitted. The reactor was restarted again on April 18. Unit 4 was restarted in June 2018.

== Reactors on site ==
All reactors at the Genkai plant use low enriched (3-4%) Uranium dioxide fuel. Genkai 1 belongs to the first generation of PWR built by Mitsubishi, based on imported technology. Genkai 2 is the first reactor of the second generation of Mitsubishi's PWR, fully using its own technology. Genkai 3 and 4 represent the third generation of Mitsubishi's PWR, with further improvements.

Name	Reactor Type	First Criticality	Power Rating	Thermal Power	Core Tonnage	# of Fuel Assemblies	Capital Costs (billion yen)
Genkai - 1	PWR	1975/02/14	559 MW	1650 MW	48 tons	121	54.5
Genkai - 2	PWR	1980/06/03	559 MW	1650 MW	48 tons	121	123.6
Genkai - 3	PWR	1993/06/15	1180 MW	3423 MW	89 tons	193	399.3
Genkai - 4	PWR	1996/11/12	1180 MW	3423 MW	89 tons	193	324.4

== See also ==
- List of nuclear power plants in Japan
