= Yoshiyoshi Arakawa =

Japanese actor

- 荒川 良々
- Born: Yoshitomo Arakawa; 18 January 1974 (age 52); Ogi (Ogi City, Ogi District), Saga Prefecture, Japan
- Other name: Jozu Arakawa (former stage name)
- Citizenship: Japan
- Occupation: Actor
- Years active: 1999–present
- Agent: Otona Keikaku
- Website: Official profile

Yoshiyoshi Arakawa (荒川 良々, Arakawa Yoshiyoshi; born January 18, 1974, in Ogi, Saga) is a Japanese actor. His real name is Yoshitomo Arakawa (荒川 良友, Arakawa Yoshitomo). He is represented with Otona Keikaku. He graduated from Ryukoku High School.

== Biography ==
Arakawa's parents are drapers. He is an individualist actor who plays an active part in the appearance of chubby body form and round cut, and he was named Jozu Arakawa (荒川 上手, Arakawa Jōzu), but due to depending on circumstances such as many misreading of names, he took a kanji letter from his real name, and renamed it to his current name (both of his names are presided by Otona Keikaku and named by Suzuki Matsuo).

Arakawa had made many appearances in films, dramas and advertisements. He played his first leading role in the film Fine, Totally Fine released in 2008.

== Filmography ==
=== Films ===
Year	Title	Role	Notes	Ref.
2004	Kamikaze Girls	Greengrocer		
2006	Memories of Matsuko	Kenji Shimazu		
2008	Fine, Totally Fine	Teruo Toyama	Lead role	
2012	Key of Life	Junichi Kudo		
2019	The 47 Ronin in Debt	Horibe Yasubei		
2023	One Second Ahead, One Second Behind	Bus driver		
2023	Kubi	Shimizu Muneharu		
2024	Cloud	Takimoto		
2024	At the Bench		Lead role; anthology film	
2026	The Samurai and the Prisoner	Muhen		

=== TV dramas ===
Year	Title	Role	Notes	Ref.
2013	Amachan	Masayoshi Yoshida	Asadora	
2016	Kazoku no Katachi	Shuichi Sasaki		
2016	Jūhan Shuttai!	Heita Mibu		
2017	The Supporting Actors	Himself		
2019	Idaten	Imamatsu	Taiga drama	
2021	Ann's Lyrics: Ann Sakuragi's Haiku Lessons	Ann's father	Miniseries	
2022	Uzukawamura Jiken	Tadahiko Yoshimi		
2025	Dr. Ashura	Tarou Bonten		
2027	The Shogunate Rebel	Minomura Rizaemon	Taiga drama	

=== Stage ===
Year	Title	Role	Notes	Ref.
2016	Vinyl no Shiro	Tar		

=== Documentaries ===
Year	Title	Notes	Ref.
2014	ETV Tokushū		

== See also ==
- Suzuki Matsuo
