= Yobuko =

Yobuko may refer to:

- Yobuko (folklore), a creature in Japanese folklore
- Yobuko, Saga, a town in Saga Prefecture, Japan
