= Nanayama, Saga =

Dissolved municipality in Saga prefecture, Japan

Nanayama (七山村, Nanayama-mura) was a village located in Higashimatsuura District, Saga Prefecture, Japan.

As of 2003, the village has an estimated population of 2,627 and a population density of 41.77 persons per km^{2}. The total area is 62.89 km^{2}.

On January 1, 2006, Nanayama was merged into the expanded city of Karatsu.
