= Ogi, Saga =

Ogi 小城市
- City
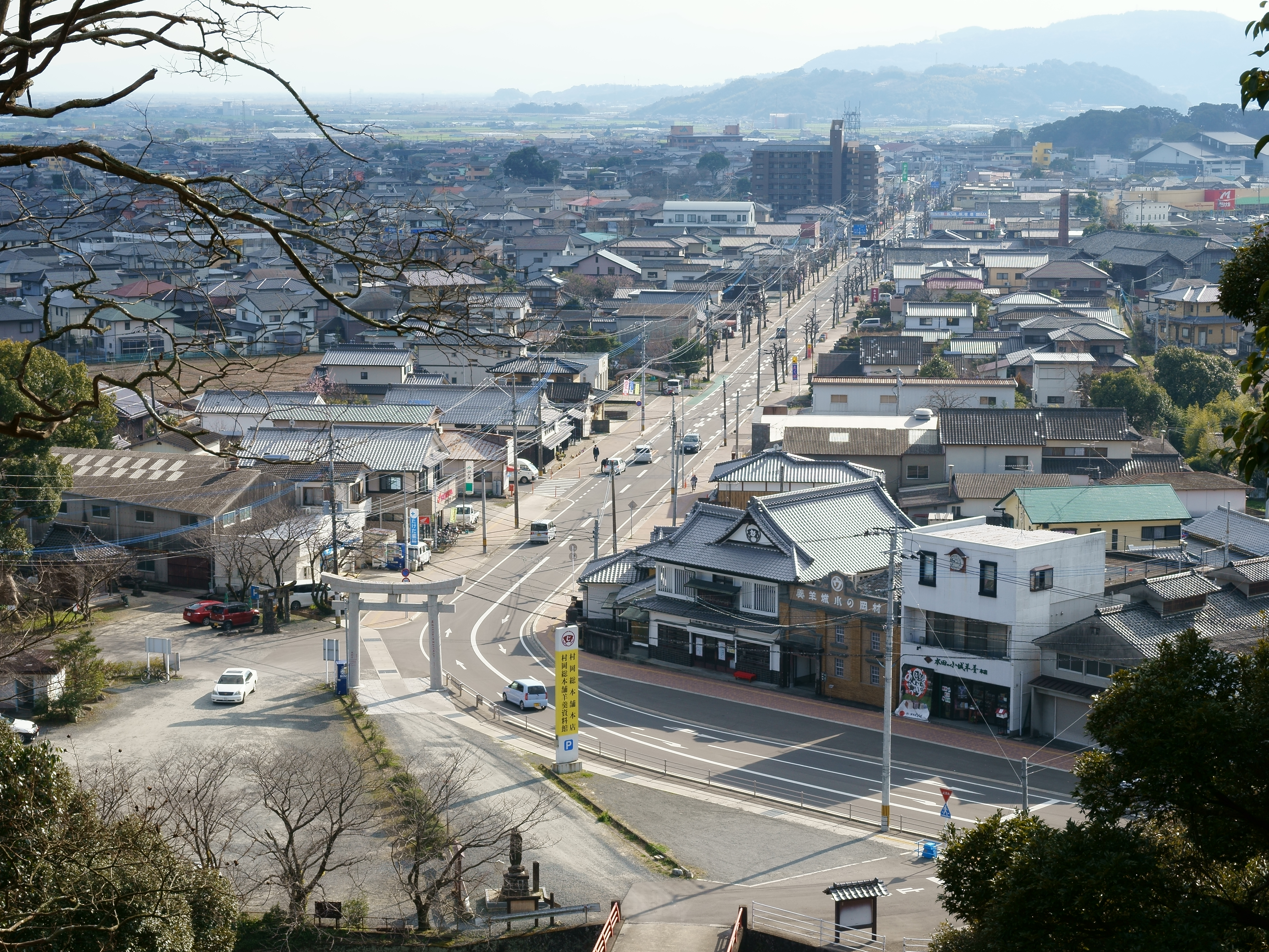
- Ogi cityscape

- Flag Seal
- Location of Ogi in Saga Prefecture

- Location in Japan
- Coordinates: 33°16′25″N 130°13′01″E
- Country: Japan
- Region: Kyushu
- Prefecture: Saga

Government
  - Mayor: Shūji Eriguchi

Area
  - Total: 95.81 km^{2} (36.99 sq mi)

Population (May 31, 2024)
  - Total: 44,120
  - Density: 460.5/km^{2} (1,193/sq mi)
- Time zone: UTC+09:00 (JST)
- City hall address: 1100-1 Kakihise, Ushizu-chō, Ogi-shi, Saga-ken; 849-0302
- Website: Official website
- Symbols
- Flower: Sakura
- Tree: Sakura

Ogi (小城市, Ogi-shi; Japanese pronunciation: [ó̞.ɡ̟ʲì, -ŋ̟ʲì, ò̞.ɡ̟ʲí(.ɕì), -ŋ̟ʲí(.ɕì)]) is a city located in the central part of Saga Prefecture on the island of Kyushu, Japan. As of 31 May 2024, the city had an estimated population of 44,120 in 17,548 households, and a population density of 240 persons per km^{2}. The total area of the city is 95.81 km^{2} (36.99 sq mi).

== Geography ==
Ogi is located in the center of Saga Prefecture, adjacent to the prefectural capital, Saga. The center of the former Ushizu Town, where the city hall is located, is located about 10 kilometers due west from the urban center of Saga City. The northern part of the city is mountainous, part of the Tenzan Mountains, while the rest of the city is low-lying land that is part of the Saga Plain. The southern part of the city faces the Ariake Sea. At the inner part of Suminoe Bay at the mouth of the Rokkaku River, the tidal range is the largest in Japan, reaching a maximum of about 6 meters during spring tides.

- Mountains: Tenzan
- Rivers: Kase River, Ushizu River

=== Adjoining municipalities ===
Saga Prefecture

- Kōhoku
- Saga
- Shiroishi
- Taku

=== Climate ===
Ogi has a humid subtropical climate (Köppen Cfa) characterized by warm summers and cool winters with light to no snowfall. The average annual temperature in Ogi is 15.3 °C. The average annual rainfall is 1902 mm with September as the wettest month. The temperatures are highest on average in August, at around 26.2 °C, and lowest in January, at around 4.7 °C.

=== Demographics ===
Per Japanese census data, the population of Ogi is as shown below.

Historical population
Year	Pop.	±%
1960	43,104	—
1970	38,471	−10.7%
1980	37,839	−1.6%
1990	40,283	+6.5%
2000	45,375	+12.6%
2010	44,259	−2.5%
2020	43,952	−0.7%

== History ==
The area of Ogi was part of ancient Hizen Province. During the Edo period it was mostly was part of the holdings of Ogi Domain, initially a sub-domain of Saga Domain, which also controlled a small portion of what is now the city limits. Following the Meiji restoration, the town of Ogi and villages of Ashikari, Haruta, Iwamatsu, Mikazuki, Misato, Togawa and Ushizu were established with the creation of the modern municipalities system of April 1, 1889. Ushizu was raised to town status on April 24, 1894. Ogi annexed Haruta, Iwamatsu and Misato on April 31, 1932m and part of Togawa on September 30, 1956. On April 1, 1967 Ashikari was elevated to town status, followed by Mikazuki on January 1, 1969. On March 3, 2005, Ogi merged with Ashikari, Mikatsuki and Ushizu (all from Ogi District) to form the city of Ogi. Ogi District was dissolved as a result of this merger.

== Government ==
Ogi has a mayor-council form of government with a directly elected mayor and a unicameral city council of 20 members. Ogi contributes two members to the Saga Prefectural Assembly. In terms of national politics, the city is part of the Saga 2nd district of the lower house of the Diet of Japan.

== Economy ==
Ogi has a mixed economy centered on agriculture, commerce and light manufacturing.

== Education ==
Ogi has seven public elementary schools, three public junior high schools and one combined elementary/junior high school operated by the city government, and two public high schools operated by the Saga Prefectural Board of Education. Nishikyushu University's School of Nursing is located in Ogi.

== Transport ==
=== Railway ===
JR Kyushu - Nagasaki Main Line

JH Ushizu

JR Kyushu - Karatsu Line

JK Ogi

=== Highways ===
- Nagasaki Expressway (Ogi PA/IC)
- National Route 34
- National Route 203
- National Route 207
- National Route 444

== Sister cities ==
- Beaucourt, Bourgogne-Franche-Comté, France

== Local attractions ==
Ogi has gradually come to be known as the city with the highest consumption of yōkan in Japan.

- Ogi Castle ruins
- Suga Jinja

== Notable people from Ogi ==
- Yoshiyoshi Arakawa, actor
- Yasuma Takada, economist
