= Saga Airport =

Saga Airport 佐賀空港
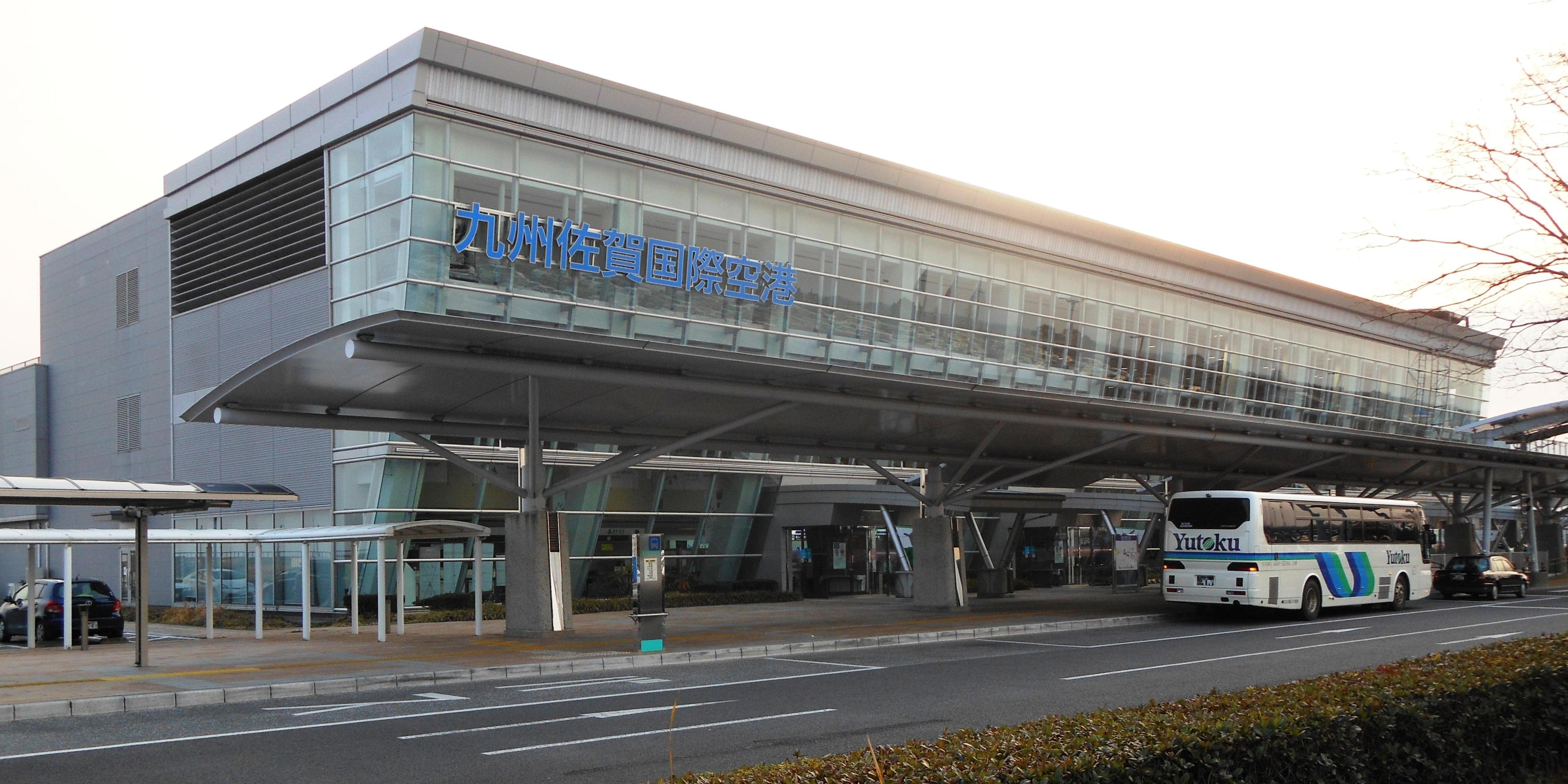
- IATA: HSG; ICAO: RJFS

Summary
- Airport type: Public (Class Three, otherwise known as Type-3)
- Owner: Saga Prefecture
- Operator: Saga Prefecture
- Serves: Fukuoka–Kitakyushu metropolitan area
- Location: Saga City
- Elevation AMSL: 6 ft (1.8 m)
- Coordinates: 33°08′59″N 130°18′08″E
- Website: Saga Airport home page

Map
- Location in Saga Prefecture Location in Japan

Runways
Direction	Length		Surface
Direction	m	ft	Surface
11/29	2,000	6,562	Asphalt concrete

Statistics (2015)
- Passengers: 630,478
- Cargo (metric tonnes): 5,050
- Aircraft movement: 10,060
- Source: Japanese Ministry of Land, Infrastructure, Transport and Tourism

Saga Airport (佐賀空港, Saga-kūkō) (IATA: HSG, ICAO: RJFS) is an airport in the Kawasoe area of Saga, Saga Prefecture, Japan. It also uses the unofficial name Kyushu Saga International Airport (九州佐賀国際空港, Kyūshū Saga Kokusai Kūkō).

Saga Airport is located on the edge of the Ariake Sea, in what is effectively a polder, 35 minutes from JR Saga Station by bus.

== History ==
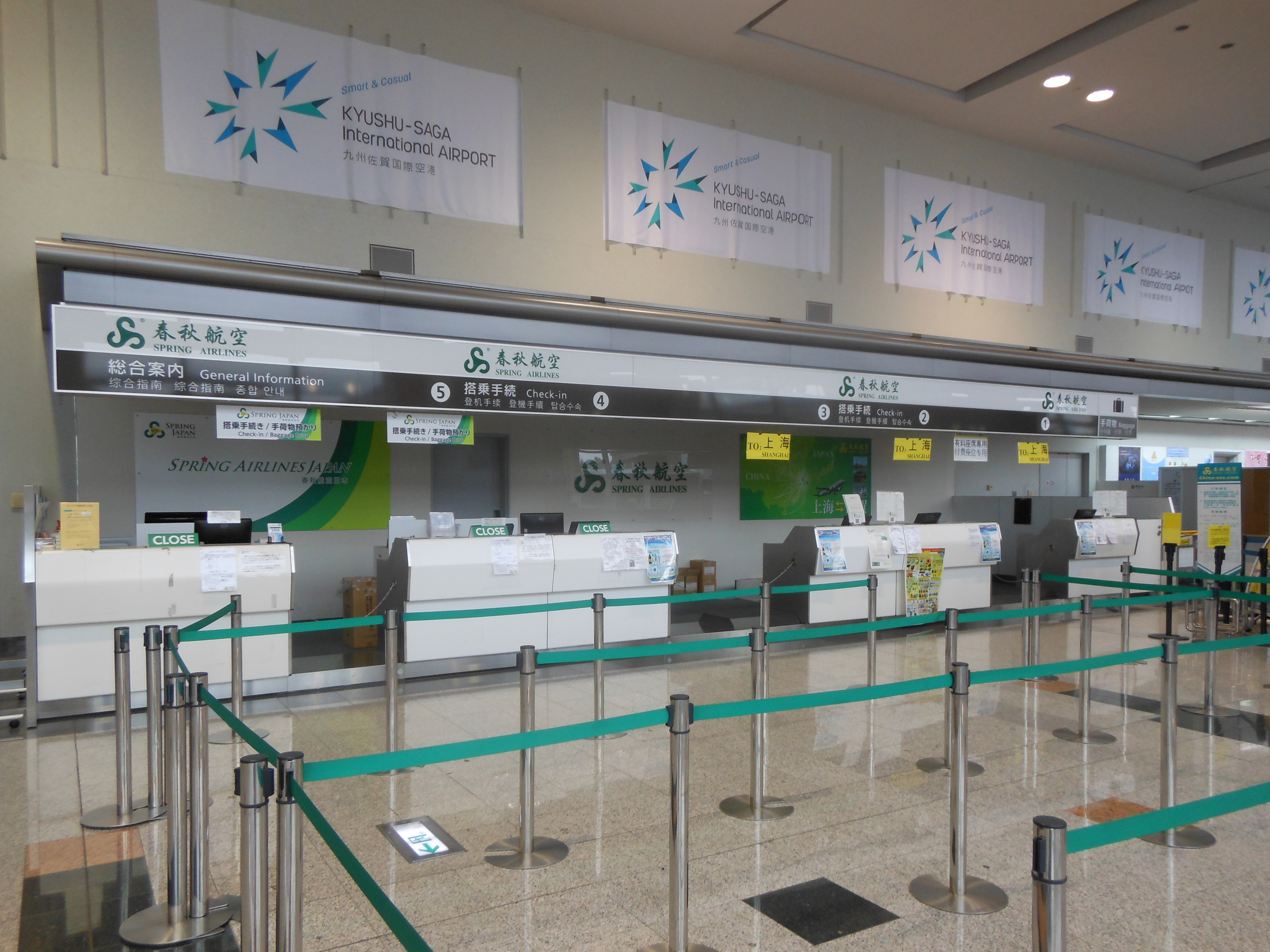
Spring Airlines check-in counter in Saga Airport

The governor of Saga Prefecture announced the construction of Saga Airport in January 1969, and after years of studies and negotiations, construction commenced in 1992. The airport opened in July 1998, with hours initially limited to 8.30 a.m. to 8 p.m. At the airport's outset, All Nippon Airways operated flights to Tokyo, Osaka and Nagoya and Japan Air System operated a daily flight to Osaka. JAS suspended service to Osaka in September 2001; ANA suspended service to Nagoya in February 2003 and to Osaka in January 2011.

Due to the slump in mainline service to the airport, Saga Prefecture began several programs aimed at promoting usage of the airport, including ground transportation subsidies for local companies that used the airport for business travel. By fiscal year 2011, these subsidies totaled 4.2 billion yen, while landing fees payable to the prefecture had been slashed to one-third of their original level. The prefectural government also embarked on a promotional effort targeting foreign low-cost carriers.

In 2004, the airport's hours were extended to allow service between midnight and 4 a.m., and ANA began overnight cargo service between Saga and Tokyo, initially using passenger aircraft but switching to Boeing 767 freighter aircraft in 2006. The flight is used by overnight delivery services to send parcels to and from destinations in Kyushu.

The airport accommodated 313,200 outbound domestic passengers in 2012. It has also accommodated charter flights to a number of domestic and international destinations in the past, although the only such flights during fiscal year 2012 were Spring Airlines "program charter" flights to Shanghai, China. Construction commenced on new facilities for international passengers in March 2013; these facilities are to be completed by December 2013.

Saga was a candidate destination to receive an additional pair of Haneda Airport slots in November 2013, but its bid was rejected by the government due to its existing four-daily service and its proximity to Fukuoka Airport.

The airport adopted the name "Kyushu Saga International Airport" in January 2016 in order to improve its appeal to foreign airlines, particularly Asian low-cost carriers, as a gateway to other destinations in Kyushu. The prefectural government's 10-year plan calls for adding flights to Hong Kong, Taipei and Southeast Asia, doubling the terminal capacity to two domestic and two international gates, increasing parking and check-in space, and potentially extending the main runway to 2,500 m.

== Airlines and destinations ==
=== Passenger ===
Airlines	Destinations
All Nippon Airways	Tokyo–Haneda
Tigerair Taiwan	Taipei–Taoyuan
Trinity Airways	Seoul–Incheon

== Military ==
As of late 2014, the Ministry of Defense was considering Saga Airport as the primary basing location for the JGSDF's planned fleet of 17 V-22 tiltrotor V/STOL transports. Separately, some examples of a maritime (ASW/SAR) variant proposed for the MSDF may also be based in the future at the airport. In the meantime, aircraft of the Japan Self-Defense Forces in general are making increasing use of Saga due to ongoing regional tensions with North Korea.

As of 2023, the JGSDF is planning to base a significant aviation element at the airfield beginning in 2025 for the purpose of better defending Japan's southern Nansei Islands. The base, located some sixty kilometers from the JGSDF's Amphibious Rapid Deployment Brigade's base at Camp Ainoura, is to host 17 V-22 aircraft and about 50 Black Hawk and Apache Longbow helicopters.
