= Saga District, Saga =

Former district in Saga prefecture, Japan

Saga District Saga-gun
- District
- Country: Japan
- Prefecture: Saga Prefecture
- Established: April 1, 1889
- Dissolved: October 1, 2007
- Time zone: UTC+09 (JST)

Saga District (佐賀郡, Saga-gun) was a district located in Saga Prefecture, Japan.

== Former towns ==
- Higashiyoka
- Kawasoe
- Kubota

== Timeline ==
- April 1, 1889 (23 villages)
  - Due to the city status enforcement, the city of Saga was formed.
  - Due to the municipal status enforcement, 23 villages were formed within Saga District.
- June 6, 1899 - The village of Kose (古瀬村) was renamed as the village of Kose (巨勢村).
- October 1, 1922 - The village of Kōno was merged into the city of Saga. (22 villages)
- April 1, 1953 - The village of Minamikawasoe was elevated to town status to become the town of Minamikawasoe. (1 town, 21 villages)
- March 31, 1954 - The villages of Hyōgo, Kose, Nishiyoka, Kase and Takagise were merged into the city of Saga. (1 town, 16 villages)
- October 1, 1954 - The villages of Kitakawasoe, Honjō, Nabeshima, Kinryū and Kuboizumi were merged into the city of Saga. (1 town, 11 villages)
- March 1, 1955 - The villages of Higashikawasoe and Shinkita were merged to create the town of Morodomi. (2 towns, 9 villages)
- April 1, 1955 - The town of Minamikawasoe, and the villages of Nakakawasoe and Ōdakuma were merged to create the town of Kawasoe. (2 towns, 7 villages)
- April 16, 1955 - The villages of Kasuga, Kawakami and Matsuume were merged to create the village of Yamato. (2 towns, 5 villages)
- September 30, 1956: (2 towns, 4 villages)
  - The village of Nishikawasoe was merged into the town of Kawasoe.
  - The village of Ozeki was merged with the villages of Nanzan and Hokuzan (both from Ogi District) to create the village of Fuji.
- June 1, 1958 - Parts of the village of Fuji (the locality of Hattabaru) was merged into the village of Yamato.
- January 1, 1959 - The village of Yamato was elevated to town status to become the town of Yamato. (3 towns, 3 villages)
- October 1, 1962 - The town of Kubota absorbed parts of the village of Hishikari (from Ogi District).
- October 1, 1966: (5 towns, 1 village)
  - The village of Higashiyoka was elevated to town status to become the town of Higashiyoka.
  - The village of Fuji was elevated to town status to become the town of Fuji.
- April 1, 1967 - The village of Kubota was elevated to town status to become the town of Kubota. (6 towns)
- April 1, 1996 - Parts of the town of Yamato (the locality of Matsuse) merged into the town of Fuji.
- October 1, 2005 - The towns of Fuji, Morodomi and Yamato, along with the village of Mitsuse (from Kanzaki District) were merged into the expanded city of Saga. (3 towns)
- October 1, 2007 - The towns of Higashiyoka, Kawasoe and Kubota were merged into the expanded city of Saga. Saga District was dissolved as a result of this merger.

Before 1889	April 1, 1889	1889–1944	1945–1959		1960–1989	1989–present		Present
	Saga	Saga	Saga		Saga	October 1, 2005; Incorporated into Saga	Saga	Saga
	Kōno	October 1, 1922; Incorporated into Saga	Saga		Saga	October 1, 2005; Incorporated into Saga	Saga	Saga
	Nishiyoka	Nishiyoka	March 31, 1954; Incorporated into Saga		Saga	October 1, 2005; Incorporated into Saga	Saga	Saga
	Kase	Kase	March 31, 1954; Incorporated into Saga		Saga	October 1, 2005; Incorporated into Saga	Saga	Saga
	Kose (古瀬村)	June 6, 1899; Renamed Kose (巨勢村)	March 31, 1954; Incorporated into Saga		Saga	October 1, 2005; Incorporated into Saga	Saga	Saga
	Hyōgo	Hyōgo	March 31, 1954; Incorporated into Saga		Saga	October 1, 2005; Incorporated into Saga	Saga	Saga
	Takagise	Takagise	March 31, 1954; Incorporated into Saga		Saga	October 1, 2005; Incorporated into Saga	Saga	Saga
	Kitakawasoe	Kitakawasoe	October 1, 1954; Incorporated into Saga		Saga	October 1, 2005; Incorporated into Saga	Saga	Saga
	Honjō	Honjō	October 1, 1954; Incorporated into Saga		Saga	October 1, 2005; Incorporated into Saga	Saga	Saga
	Nabeshima	Nabeshima	October 1, 1954; Incorporated into Saga		Saga	October 1, 2005; Incorporated into Saga	Saga	Saga
	Kinryū	Kinryū	October 1, 1954; Incorporated into Saga		Saga	October 1, 2005; Incorporated into Saga	Saga	Saga
	Kuboizumi	Kuboizumi	October 1, 1954; Incorporated into Saga		Saga	October 1, 2005; Incorporated into Saga	Saga	Saga
	Higashikawasoe	Higashikawasoe	March 1, 1955; Merged into Morodomi		Morodomi	October 1, 2005; Incorporated into Saga	Saga	Saga
	Shinkita	Shinkita	March 1, 1955; Merged into Morodomi		Morodomi	October 1, 2005; Incorporated into Saga	Saga	Saga
	Kasuga	Kasuga	April 16, 1955; Merged into Yamato	January 1, 1959; Elevated to town status	Yamato	October 1, 2005; Incorporated into Saga	Saga	Saga
	Kawakami	Kawakami	April 16, 1955; Merged into Yamato	January 1, 1959; Elevated to town status	Yamato	October 1, 2005; Incorporated into Saga	Saga	Saga
	Matsuume	Matsuume	April 16, 1955; Merged into Yamato	January 1, 1959; Elevated to town status	Yamato	October 1, 2005; Incorporated into Saga	Saga	Saga
	Ozeki	Ozeki	September 30, 1956; Merged into Fuji		October 1, 1966; Elevated to town status	October 1, 2005; Incorporated into Saga	Saga	Saga
	Hokuzan (Ogi District)	Hokuzan (Ogi District)	September 30, 1956; Merged into Fuji		October 1, 1966; Elevated to town status	October 1, 2005; Incorporated into Saga	Saga	Saga
	Nanzan (Ogi District)	Nanzan (Ogi District)	September 30, 1956; Merged into Fuji		October 1, 1966; Elevated to town status	October 1, 2005; Incorporated into Saga	Saga	Saga
	Minamikawasoe	Minamikawasoe	April 1, 1953; Elevated to town status	April 1, 1955; Merged into Kawasoe	Kawasoe	Kawasoe	October 1, 2007; Incorporated into Saga	Saga
	Nakakawasoe	Nakakawasoe	Nakakawasoe	April 1, 1955; Merged into Kawasoe	Kawasoe	Kawasoe	October 1, 2007; Incorporated into Saga	Saga
	Ōdakuma	Ōdakuma	Ōdakuma	April 1, 1955; Merged into Kawasoe	Kawasoe	Kawasoe	October 1, 2007; Incorporated into Saga	Saga
	Nishikawasoe	Nishikawasoe	Nishikawasoe	September 30, 1956; Incorporated into Kawasoe	Kawasoe	Kawasoe	October 1, 2007; Incorporated into Saga	Saga
	Higashiyoka	Higashiyoka	Higashiyoka		October 1, 1966; Elevated to town status	Higashiyoka	October 1, 2007; Incorporated into Saga	Saga
	Kubota	Kubota	Kubota		April 1, 1967; Elevated to town status	Kubota	October 1, 2007; Incorporated into Saga	Saga

== See also ==
- List of dissolved districts of Japan
