= Fine, Totally Fine =

- Film poster
- Directed by: Yosuke Fujita
- Written by: Yosuke Fujita
- Starring: Yoshiyoshi Arakawa; Yoshino Kimura; Yoshinori Okada
- Cinematography: Yoshihiro Ikeuchi
- Release date: January 26, 2008 (Japan)
- Running time: 110 minutes
- Country: Japan
- Language: Japanese

Fine, Totally Fine (Japanese: 全然大丈夫, Hepburn: Zenzen daijōbu) is a 2008 Japanese comedy film written and directed by Yosuke Fujita. It is a humorous ensemble drama that portrays various people who have some difficulty at adapting to society.

== Plot ==
29-year-old Teruo Toyama (Yoshiyoshi Arakawa) lives with his father, who runs a second-hand bookstore, and works as a non-regular employee for a gardening company. On his days off, he enjoys making scary devices with his former classmate Hisanobu Komori (Yoshinori Okada), who is an office worker. He is now 29 and becoming a little uncomfortable. One day, Teruo's father (Keizo Kanie) becomes depressed and bedridden, so Teruo ends up working at the store. Then, his father, after being bedridden for a while, goes on a wandering journey to recover from his depression.

Akari Kinoshita (Yoshino Kimura) is a quizzical woman who is interested in a homeless female artist (Kayoko Shiraishi) who lives on the river beach. She paints pictures of the homeless woman as her hobby. One day, she comes to a job interview at the company where Komori works, which undertakes cleaning of hospitals, and Komori, who was asked by his boss to conduct the interview, decides to hires her.

Akari turns out to be surprisingly clumsy and has a hard time getting accustomed to her job. One day, she is asked to press the button for the luggage elevator, but in her haste, she breaks a finger. Moreover, while cleaning the floor of the operation room, she slips on spilled blood and knocks over an expensive medical equipment. After consulting with her boss, she decides to quit. Komori, who now has a crush on Akari, is worried about her and visits her apartment. He then introduces her to a job at Teruo's second-hand bookstore.

Working with Akari, Teruo also begins to fall in love with her, but at the same time, Komori's affection for her grows stronger. Akari, on her part, smoothly learns the job at the store with the guidance of Teruo's elder sister Tomoko (Shima Ise).

Meanwhile, Teruo's father, Eitaro, who went on a trip, finds a young girlfriend (Miyuki Torii), and appears in a TV travel program singing his own song to her playing the ukulele. Eitaro seems to be safely recovering.

One day, an antique restoration craftsman named Yuhara (Naoki Tanaka), drops by Teruo’s store. He sees Akari's paintings that were on display in the store and asks Akari if he can buy one of them. She declines his request saying that they are not for sale. However, soon after Yuhara leaves, Akari runs after Yuhara holding her painting, asking Kurita (Kitaro), a hardware store owner who happened to be in the store, to look after the store. She finds Yuhara and gives him the painting. This leads Akari and Yuhara to start dating.

Akari accompanies Yuhara to Nara, where he begins to learn restoration techniques for Buddhist statues. Teruo and Komori go to Nara on their day off to visit Akari and Yuhara, and enjoy the day in Nara.

== Awards ==
It won the Audience Award at the 2008 New York Asian Film Festival and the Nippon Connection Grand Prize.
