= Genkai, Saga =

Genkai 玄海町
- Town
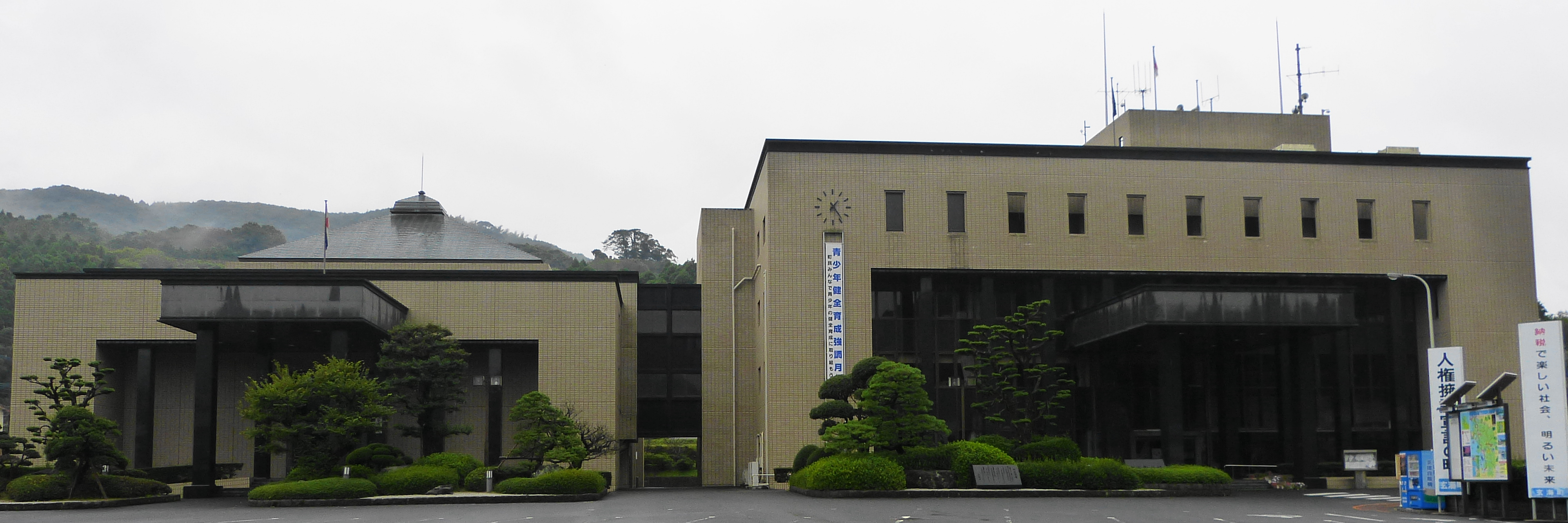
- Genkai Town Hall

- Flag Emblem
- Interactive map of Genkai
- Location in Japan
- Coordinates: 33°28′20″N 129°52′29″E
- Country: Japan
- Region: Kyushu
- Prefecture: Saga
- District: Higashimatsuura

Area
  - Total: 35.92 km^{2} (13.87 sq mi)

Population (May 31, 2024)
  - Total: 4,910
  - Density: 137/km^{2} (354/sq mi)
- Time zone: UTC+09:00 (JST)
- City hall address: 348 Ōaza Shoura, Genkai-chō, Higashimatsuura-gun, Saga-ken 847-1421
- Website: Official website
- Symbols
- Flower: Sakura
- Tree: Japanese Zelkova

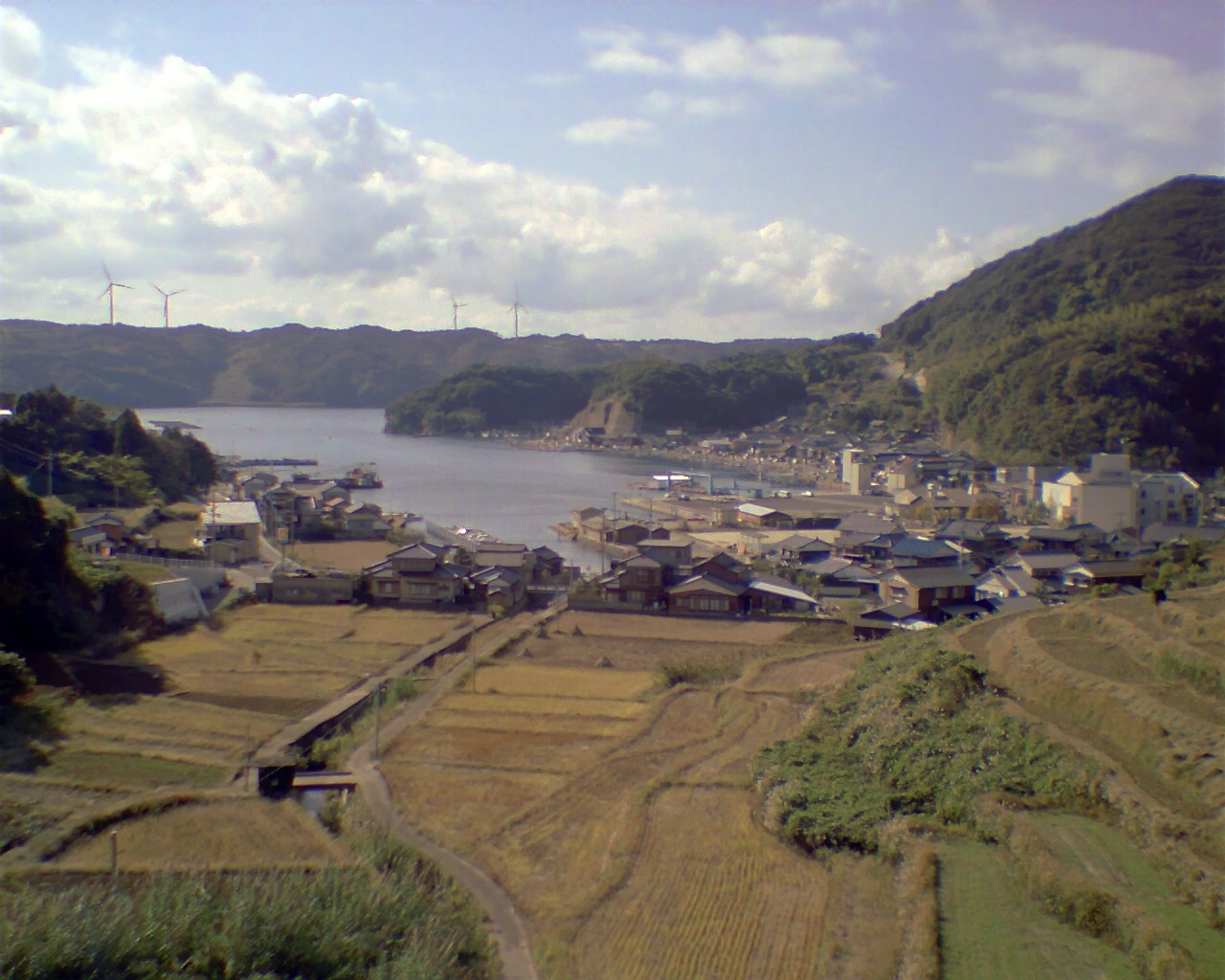
A fishing village at Kariya Port in Genkai.

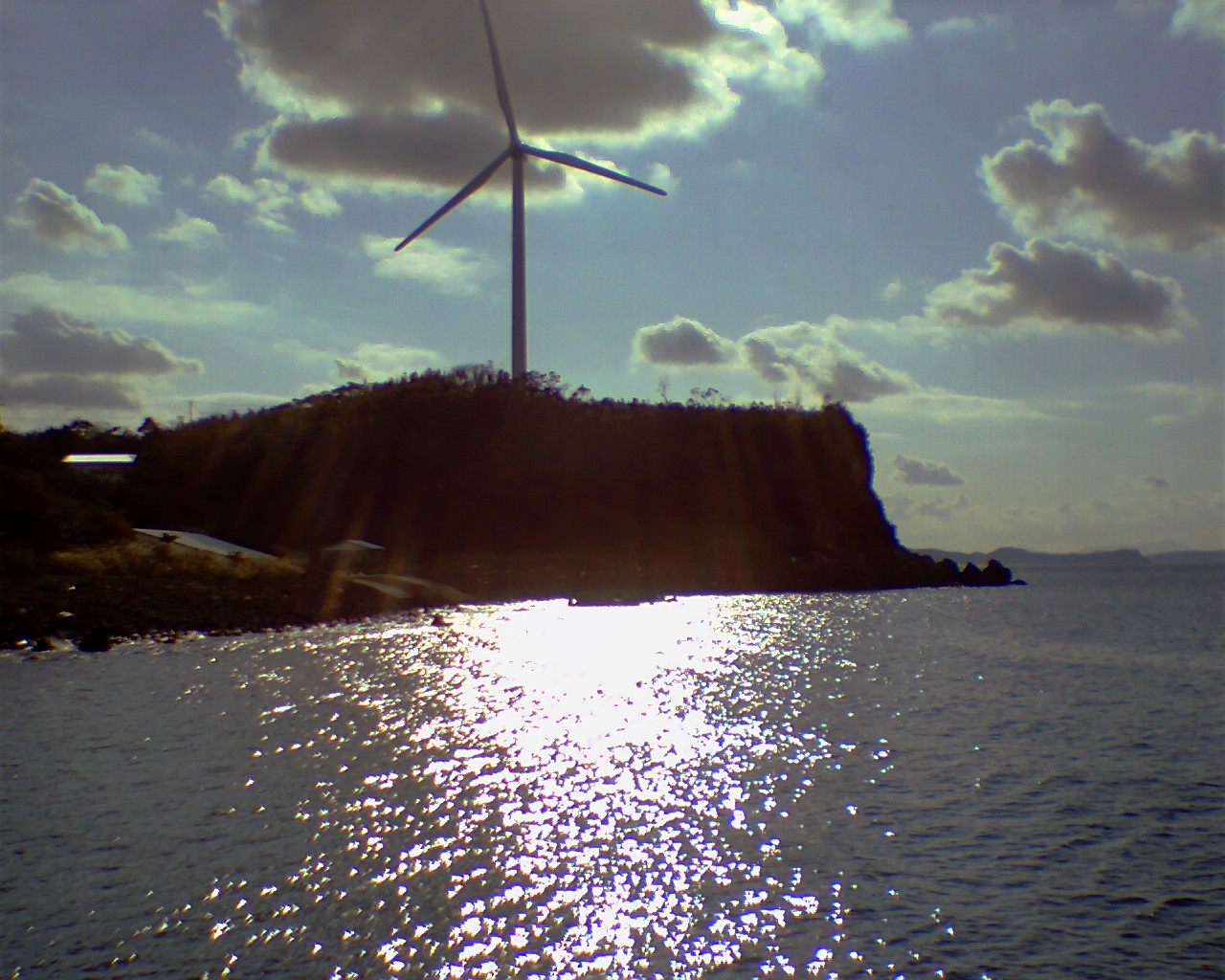
A wind turbine in Genkai.

Genkai (玄海町, Genkai-chō) is a town located in Higashimatsuura District, Saga Prefecture, Japan. As of 31 May 2024, the town had an estimated population of 4,910 in 1918 households, and a population density of 240 persons per km^{2}. The total area of the city is 35.92 km^{2} (13.87 sq mi).

== Geography ==
Genkai is located on the northwestern edge of the prefecture on the Higashimatsuura Peninsula and faces the Genkai Sea on its west side. It is located about 50 km (31 mi) northwest of the city of Saga and about 60 kilometres (37 mi) west of Fukuoka. Genkai is home to one of sixteen nuclear power plants in Japan, with the only other nuclear power plant in the Kyūshū area being located in Kagoshima Prefecture. It is the only town in the Higashimatsuura District of Saga that has not merged with Karatsu.

=== Adjoining municipalities ===
Saga Prefecture

- Karatsu

=== Climate ===
Genkai has a humid subtropical climate (Köppen Cfa) characterized by warm summers and cool winters with light to no snowfall. The average annual temperature in Genkai is 16.8 °C. The average annual rainfall is 1764 mm with September as the wettest month. The temperatures are highest on average in August, at around 27.1 °C, and lowest in January, at around 7.2 °C.

=== Demographics ===
Per Japanese census data, the population of Genkai is as shown below.

Historical population
Year	Pop.	±%
1970	8,075	—
1980	7,427	−8.0%
1990	7,622	+2.6%
2000	7,737	+1.5%
2010	6,738	−12.9%
2020	5,902	−12.4%

== History ==
The area of Genkai was part of ancient Hizen Province. During the Edo period, the area was part of Karatsu Domain. Following the Meiji restoration, the villages of Chika and Ariura, were established with the creation of the modern municipalities system. The two villages merged on September 30, 1956, to form the town of Genkai. On December 31, 1957, the neighborhoods of Sosorogawachi, Yunoo, Fujihira, Tashiro from the village of Kirigo were incorporated into Genkai. Kirigo's remaining neighborhoods are incorporated into Karatsu.

=== The great Heisei merger ===
All other towns and villages from Higashimatsuura District were incorporated into Karatsu between 2005 and 2006. Genkai originally planned to merge into Karatsu with the rest of the district, but was concerned about the slow administrative response of the surrounding areas. Eventually they withdrew their decision to merge and decided to continue as an autonomous municipality.

== Government ==
Genkai has a mayor-council form of government with a directly elected mayor and a unicameral city council of ten members. Genzai, collectively with the city of Karatsu, contributes six members to the Saga Prefectural Assembly. In terms of national politics, the town is part of the Saga 2nd district of the lower house of the Diet of Japan.

== Economy ==
Genkai is now enjoying a relatively high amount of revenue from the Genkai Nuclear Power Plant, built in 1975, but there is a question as to its administration in the future. There is also some agriculture, notably the cultivation of strawberries, and commercial fishing.

== Education ==
Genkai has one public combined elementary/junior high school operated by the city government. Opened on April 1, 2015, the school had 498 students from grades 1 - 9 across 19 classes and 6 special needs classes. There is also one public high school operated by the Saga Prefectural Board of Education.

== Transport ==
=== Railway ===
Genkai does not have any passenger railway service. The nearest train station is Nishikaratsu Station on the JR Kyushu Karatsu Line. A bus route runs from the station to Genkai.

=== Highways ===
- National Route 204

== Sister cities ==
- Gravelines, France

== Local attractions ==
- Genkai Energy Park (玄海エネルギーパーク)
- Hamanoura Rice Terraces (浜野浦の棚田)
- Kaijō Onsen Parea (海上温泉パレア)
