= Higashiyoka, Saga =

Dissolved municipality in Saga district, Saga prefecture, Japan

Higashiyoka (東与賀町, Higashiyoka-chō) was a town in Saga District, Saga Prefecture, Japan. It occupied a low-lying reclaimed area on the northern shore of the Ariake Sea and covered 15.39 km^{2} (5.94 sq mi). Higashiyoka was established as a village on 1 April 1889, was raised to town status on 1 October 1966, and was merged into the expanded city of Saga on 1 October 2007. In the 2015 census, the former Higashiyoka area had a population of 8,451.

== Geography ==
Higashiyoka lay in the southern part of present-day Saga, on the coastal plain facing the Ariake Sea. The town stretched about 3.5 kilometres east to west and 7 kilometres north to south. Its elevation ranged from 0.4 to 2.8 metres above sea level, and its eastern side was defined by the Hattae River, while its southern edge faced the sea behind a straight concrete embankment.

Much of the town was created through reclamation from the Ariake Sea. Saga City describes Higashiyoka as being almost entirely reclaimed land, and notes that the area's historic embankments preserve the history of coastal reclamation in the region.

== History ==
According to Saga City's local history materials, the area that later became Higashiyoka was still under the sea around the year 1300. Over time, river-borne sediment and successive reclamation projects pushed the shoreline southward, especially from the early modern period onward and more intensively after the Meiji era began.

Under Japan's modern municipal system, Higashiyoka was created as the village of Higashiyoka on 1 April 1889. It became the town of Higashiyoka on 1 October 1966. On 1 October 2007, it was merged with Kawasoe and Kubota into the expanded city of Saga.

== Natural environment ==
The coast off Higashiyoka includes Higashiyoka-higata, a 218 ha (540 acres) mudflat on the northern Ariake Sea. Saga Prefecture describes it as a muddy tidal flat developed along the coast and at the mouths of the Honjōe and Hattae rivers. A guidebook issued by the Ministry of the Environment states that Higashiyoka-higata is one of Japan's largest tidal flats, with tidal differences of about six metres in the Ariake Sea and extensive mudflats exposed at low tide.

The wetland is an important stopover and wintering site for migratory waterbirds, including threatened species such as the black-faced spoonbill, far eastern curlew and Saunders's gull. Saga Prefecture reported that the Ministry of the Environment's Monitoring Site 1000 survey counted 11,665 shorebirds there in spring 2014, the highest total recorded nationally that year. The tidal flat was registered under the Ramsar Convention in May 2015.
