= Mikatsuki, Saga =

Dissolved municipality in Saga prefecture, Japan

Mikatsuki (三日月町, Mikatsuki-chō) was a town located in Ogi District, Saga Prefecture, Japan. The status of Mikatsuki was changed from a village to a town on January 1, 1969.

As of 2003, the town had an estimated population of 11,675 and a density of 568.68 persons per km^{2}. Its total area was 20.53 km^{2}.

On March 1, 2005, Mikatsuki, along with the towns of Ogi (former), Ashikari and Ushizu (all from Ogi District), was merged to create the city of Ogi.
