= Hamatama, Saga =

Dissolved municipality in Saga prefecture, Japan

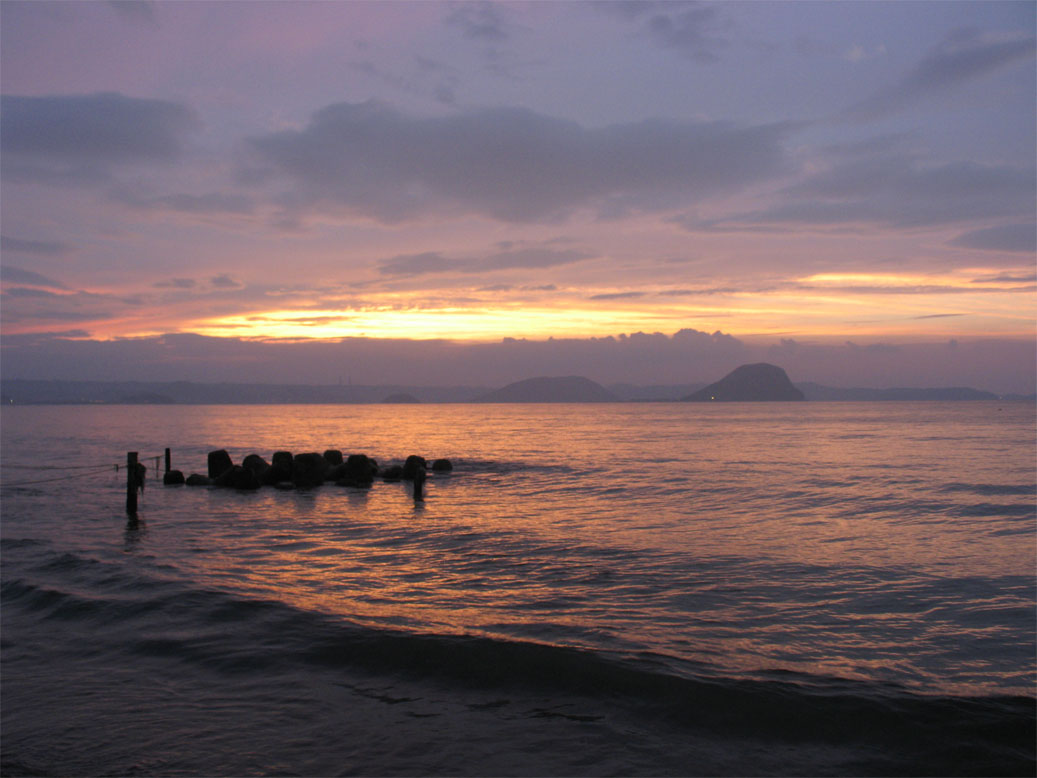
Sunset on the beach in Hamatama

Hamatama (浜玉町, Hamatama-chō) was a town located in the Higashimatsuura District of Saga Prefecture, Japan.

As of 2003, the town had an estimated population of 10,311 and a density of 197.79 persons per km^{2}. The total area was 52.13 km^{2}.

On January 1, 2005, Hamatama, along with the towns of Chinzei, Hizen, Kyūragi, Ōchi and Yobuko, and the village of Kitahata (all from Higashimatsuura District), was merged into the expanded city of Karatsu.

It is adjacent to the relatively well-known Nijinomatsubara pine tree forest, and borders the Sea of Japan with three miles of whitesand beach. Behind the beach and forest is Mt Kagamiyama with its outstanding observatory,.
