= Chiyoda, Saga =

Former town located in Saga Prefecture, Japan

Chiyoda (千代田町, Chiyoda-chō) was a town located in the Kanzaki District of Saga Prefecture, on the island of Kyūshū, Japan. The status of this municipality was changed from a village to a town on April 1, 1965.

As of 2003, the town had an estimated population of 11,924 and a population density of 481.39 persons per km^{2}. The total area is 24.77 km^{2}.

On March 20, 2006, Chiyoda, along with the town of Kanzaki (former), and the village of Sefuri (all from Kanzaki District), was merged to create the city of Kanzaki.
