= Morodomi, Saga =

Dissolved municipality in Saga prefecture, Japan

Morodomi (諸富町, Morodomi-chō) was a town located in Saga District, Saga Prefecture, Japan.

As of 2003, the town had an estimated population of 11,984 and a density of 997.00 persons per km^{2}. The total area was 12.02 km^{2}.

On October 1, 2005, Morodomi, along the towns of Fuji and Yamato (all from Saga District), and the village of Mitsuse (from Kanzaki District), was merged into the expanded city of Saga.
