= Nishikyushu University =

- 西九州大学
- Type: Private university
- Established: 1968
- Location: Kanzaki, Saga, Japan; 33°19′46.8″N 130°20′53.8″E
- Website: Official website (in Japanese)
- Location in Japan

Nishikyushu University (西九州大学, Nishi kyūshū daigaku) is a private university in Kanzaki, Saga, Japan. The school was established in 1968.
