= Kanzaki, Saga =

Kanzaki 神埼市
- City
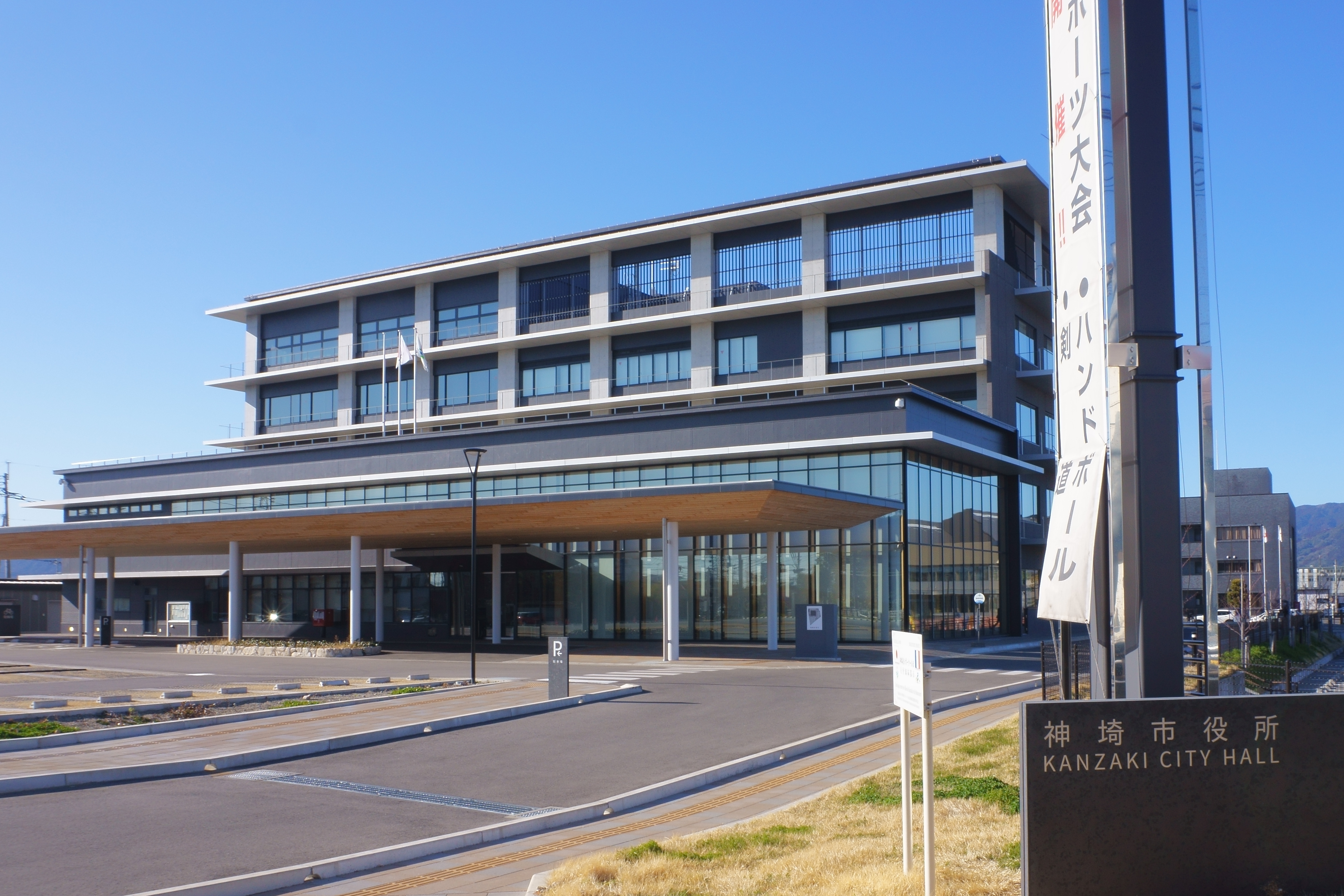
- Kanzaki City Hall

- Flag Emblem
- Interactive map of Kanzaki
- Location in Japan
- Coordinates: 33°18′43″N 130°22′17″E
- Country: Japan
- Region: Kyushu
- Prefecture: Saga

Government
  - Mayor: Shigeyuki Matsumoto (from March 2005, including then Kanzaki Town)

Area
  - Total: 125.13 km^{2} (48.31 sq mi)

Population (April 30, 2024)
  - Total: 30,329
  - Density: 242.38/km^{2} (627.76/sq mi)
- Time zone: UTC+09:00 (JST)
- City hall address: 410 Kanzaki, Kanzaki-chō, Kanzaki-shi, Saga-ken 842-0001
- Website: Official website
- Symbols
- Flower: Cherry Blossom
- Tree: Maple

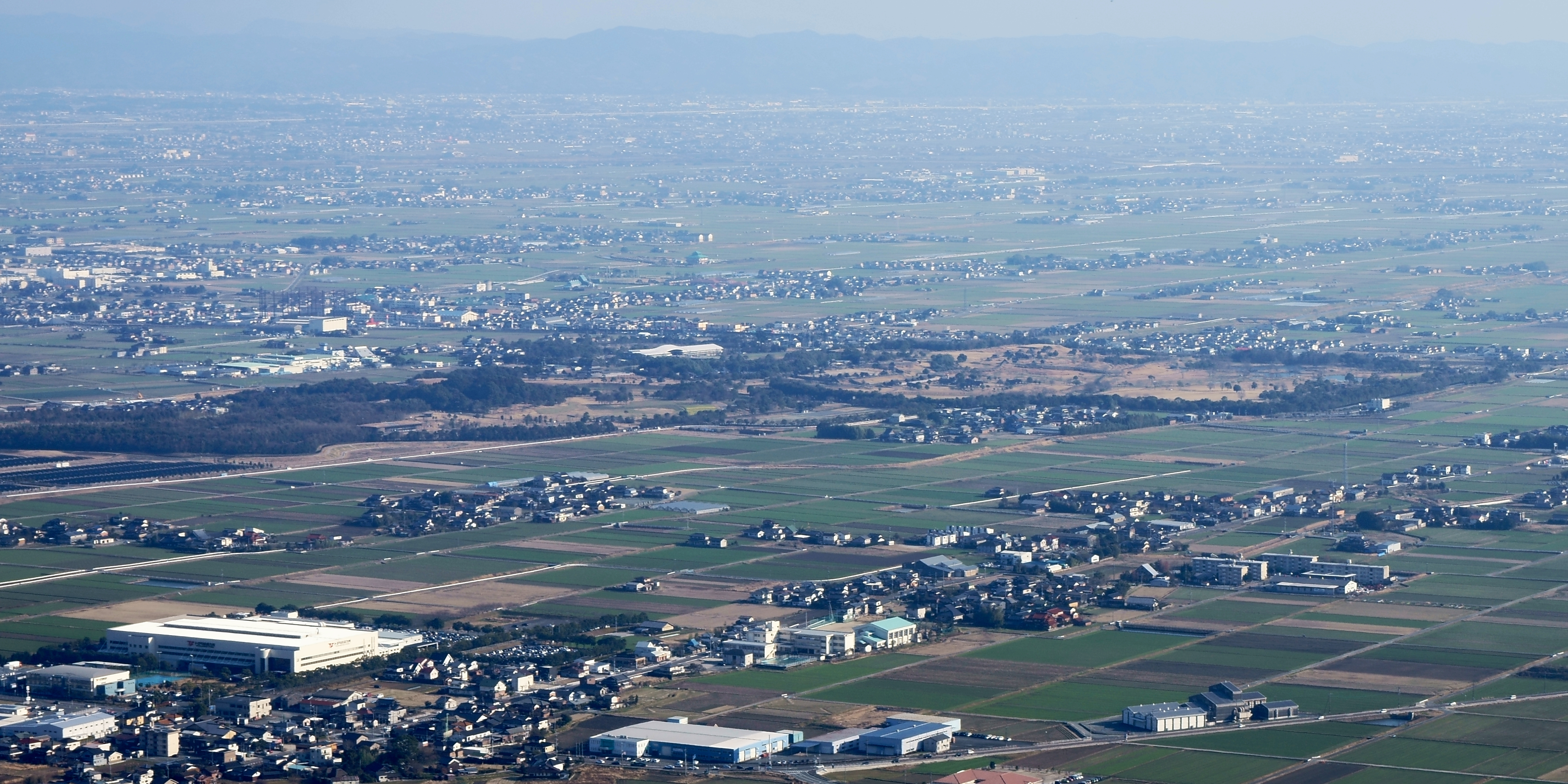
Panoramic view of Kanzaki, from Mount Kawarake

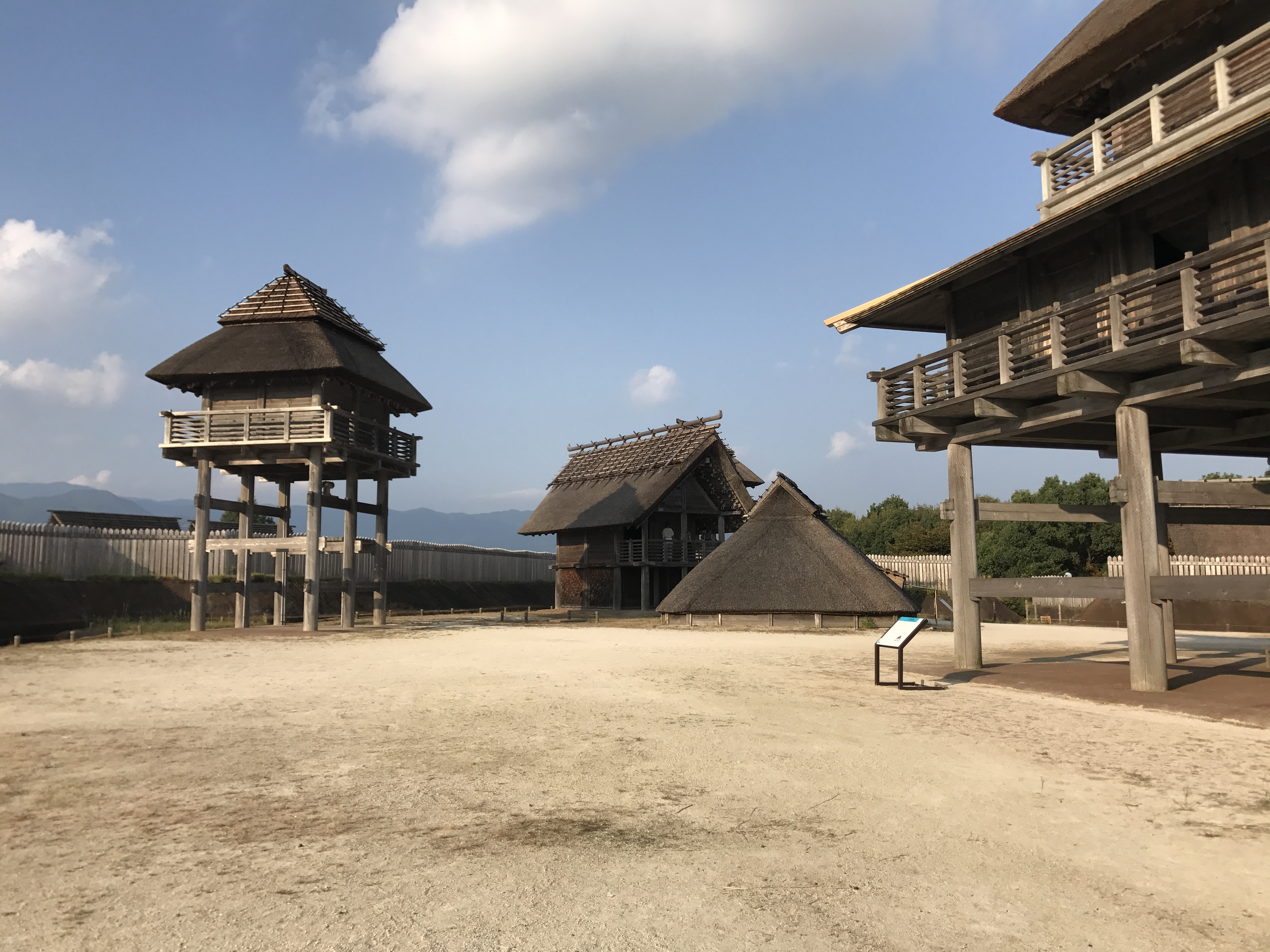
Panoramic view of Yoshinogari Ancient Ruin, discovered in 1989

Kanzaki (神埼市, Kanzaki-shi) is a city located in Saga Prefecture, Japan. As of 30 April 2024, the city had an estimated population of 30,329 in 12,440 households, and a population density of 240 persons per km^{2}. The total area of the city is 125.13 km^{2} (48.31 sq mi).

== Geography ==
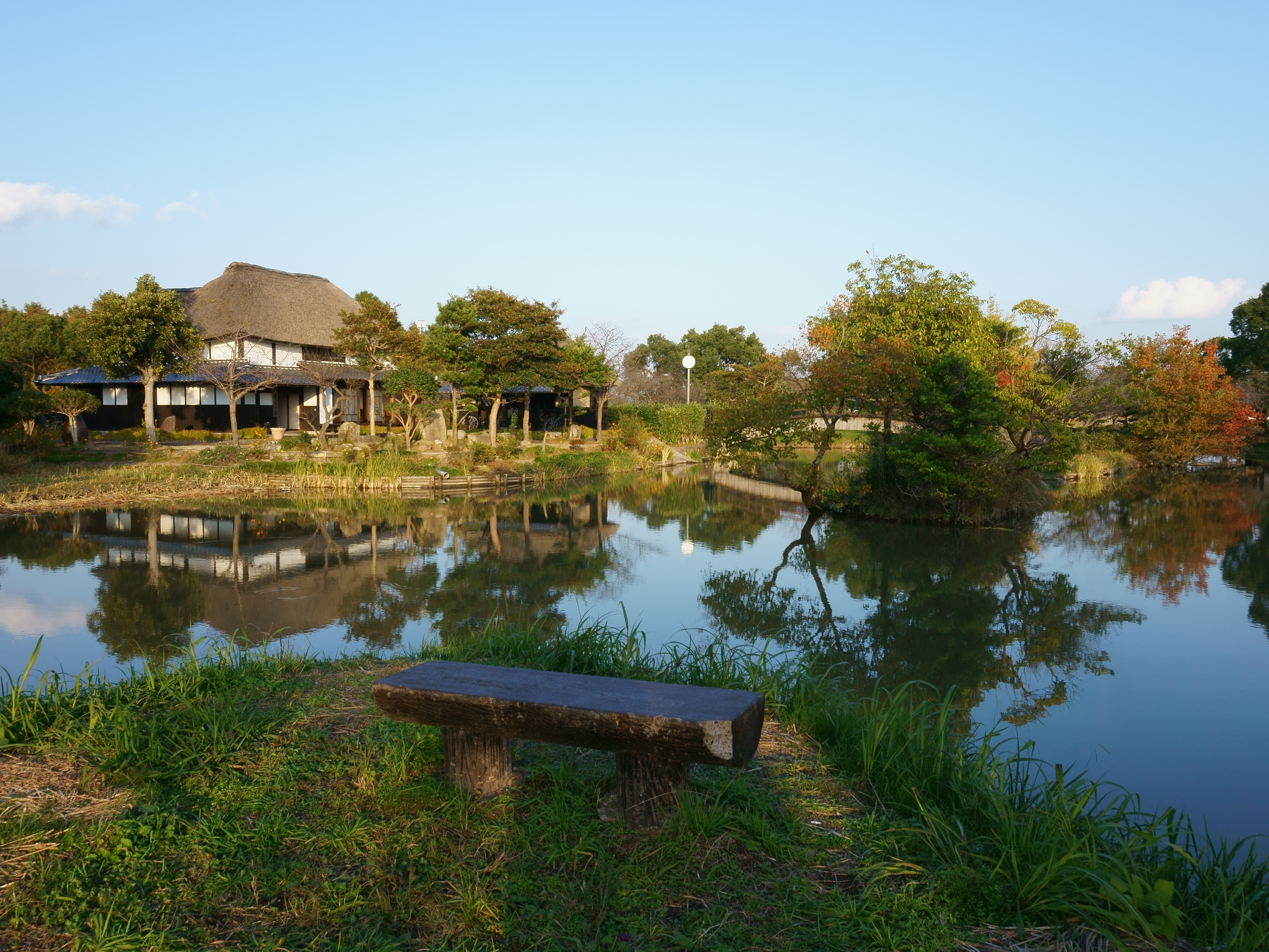
Yokotake Creek Park

Kanzaki is located approximately 10 kilometers northeast of the center of Saga City, and has a long and narrow city area from north to south. The northern part is located in the Sefuri Mountains. The southern part of the city is located in the Saga Plain on the north bank of the Chikugo River, and the Jōbaru River runs through the middle portion of the city. In addition, the southeastern part borders Kurume, Fukuoka, across the Chikugo River.

- Mountains: Mount Sefuri (1055 m), Mt. Doki (Mt. Hatten, 430 m)
- Rivers: Chikugo River, Jōbaru River, Tade River, Sanbonmatsu River

=== Adjoining municipalities ===
Fukuoka Prefecture

- Kurume
- Ōkawa
- Sawara Ward, Fukuoka City

Saga Prefecture

- Miyaki
- Saga
- Yoshinogari

=== Climate ===
Kanzaki has a humid subtropical climate (Köppen Cfa) characterized by warm summers and cool winters with light to no snowfall. The average annual temperature in Kanzaki is 15.6 °C. The average annual rainfall is 1902 mm with September as the wettest month. The temperatures are highest on average in August, at around 26.5 °C, and lowest in January, at around 5.0 °C.

=== Demographics ===
Per Japanese census data, the population of Kanzaki is as shown below.

Historical population
Year	Pop.	±%
1940	37,181	—
1950	34,745	−6.6%
1960	31,895	−8.2%
1970	31,815	−0.3%
1980	32,502	+2.2%
1990	33,648	+3.5%
2000	32,901	−2.2%
2010	32,899	−0.0%
2020	31,022	−5.7%

== History ==
The area of Kanzaki was part of ancient Hizen Province. Per the Hizen Koku Fudoki, during the Kofun period the area was ruled by several powerful clans, which were defeated by Emperor Keiko. During the Edo period, Kanzaki was part of the Saga Domain, with approximately a third of the area under the sub-domain of Hasuike Domain. Following the Meiji restoration, the villages of Chitose, Hasuike, Kanzaki, Niiyama, Saigō, Sakaino, Sefuri and Shirota were established with the creation of the modern municipalities system. Kanzaki was raised to town status on July 1, 1893. Hasuike was raised to town status on November 3, 1935. On March 31, 1955, the villages of Saigō and Niiyama were merged into Kanzaki, and on April 1, 1955, the villages of Chitose, Sakaino, Shirota, and parts of the town of Hasuike were merged to create the village of Chiyoda, which was raised to town status on April 1, 1965. The city of Kanzaki was established on March 20, 2006 from the merger of the former town of Kanzaki, absorbing the town of Chiyoda and the village of Sefuri (all from Kanzaki District). As a result of this merger, there are no longer any villages in Saga Prefecture.

== Government ==
Kanzaki has a mayor-council form of government with a directly elected mayor and a unicameral city council of 18 members. Kanazaki, collectively with the municipalities of Kanzaki District contributes two members to the Saga Prefectural Assembly. In terms of national politics, the city is part of the Saga 1st district of the lower house of the Diet of Japan.

== Economy ==
Kanzaki has a mixed economy centered on agriculture, commerce and light manufacturing.

== Education ==
Kanzaki has seven public elementary schools and three public junior high schools operated by the city government, and two public high schools operated by the Saga Prefectural Board of Education. Nishikyushu University is located in Kanzaki.

== Transport ==
=== Railway ===
JR Kyushu - Nagasaki Main Line

JH Kanzaki

=== Highways ===
- National Route 34
- National Route 264
- National Route 385

== Sister cities ==
- Beaucourt, Bourgogne-Franche-Comté, France

== Local attractions ==
- Holiday Chiyoda (堀デーちよだ)
- Home of Kojin Shimomura
- Hōshu-dera
- Jirōnomori Park
- Kunen Hermitage
- Kushida-gū
- Niiyama Park
- Niiyama Shrine
- Naotori Castle ruins
- Yoshinogari Historical Park

== Notable people from Kanzaki ==
- Egashira 2:50
