= Sefuri, Saga =

Dissolved municipality in Saga prefecture, Japan

Sefuri (脊振村, Sefuri-mura) was a village located in Kanzaki District, Saga Prefecture, Japan.

== Population ==
As of 2003, the village had an estimated population of 1,941 and a population density of 31.86 persons per km^{2}. The total area was 60.93 km^{2}.

== History ==
On March 20, 2006, Sefuri, along with the towns of Kanzaki (former) and Chiyoda (all from Kanzaki District), was merged to create the city of Kanzaki.
