= Kawasoe, Saga =

Dissolved municipality in Saga prefecture, Japan

Kawasoe (川副町, Kawasoe-machi) was a town located in Saga District, Saga Prefecture, Japan.

As of 2006, the town had an estimated population of 18,492 and a density of 398 persons per km^{2}. Its total area was 46.49 km^{2}.

On October 1, 2007, Kawasoe, along with the towns of Higashiyoka and Kubota (all from Saga District), was merged into the expanded city of Saga.

Saga Airport was located in the former territory of Kawasoe.

== Climate ==
Climate data for Kawasoe (2003−2020 normals, extremes 2003−present)
Month	Jan	Feb	Mar	Apr	May	Jun	Jul	Aug	Sep	Oct	Nov	Dec	Year
Record high °C (°F)	17.5 (63.5)	20.1 (68.2)	24.4 (75.9)	28.1 (82.6)	32.3 (90.1)	34.9 (94.8)	36.8 (98.2)	37.1 (98.8)	35.3 (95.5)	32.2 (90.0)	26.6 (79.9)	23.0 (73.4)	37.1 (98.8)
Mean daily maximum °C (°F)	9.7 (49.5)	11.4 (52.5)	14.6 (58.3)	19.6 (67.3)	24.5 (76.1)	27.0 (80.6)	30.4 (86.7)	32.2 (90.0)	29.0 (84.2)	24.2 (75.6)	18.2 (64.8)	11.9 (53.4)	21.1 (69.9)
Daily mean °C (°F)	5.0 (41.0)	6.6 (43.9)	9.7 (49.5)	14.4 (57.9)	19.3 (66.7)	23.0 (73.4)	26.9 (80.4)	27.9 (82.2)	24.2 (75.6)	18.6 (65.5)	12.8 (55.0)	7.0 (44.6)	16.3 (61.3)
Mean daily minimum °C (°F)	0.2 (32.4)	1.7 (35.1)	4.4 (39.9)	8.8 (47.8)	14.1 (57.4)	19.5 (67.1)	24.0 (75.2)	24.5 (76.1)	20.2 (68.4)	13.5 (56.3)	7.5 (45.5)	2.1 (35.8)	11.7 (53.1)
Record low °C (°F)	−9.5 (14.9)	−6.2 (20.8)	−4.4 (24.1)	−0.2 (31.6)	4.2 (39.6)	10.8 (51.4)	17.6 (63.7)	16.1 (61.0)	11.1 (52.0)	3.4 (38.1)	−1.3 (29.7)	−5.2 (22.6)	−9.5 (14.9)
Average precipitation mm (inches)	40.4 (1.59)	73.7 (2.90)	97.3 (3.83)	123.9 (4.88)	149.4 (5.88)	265.4 (10.45)	370.6 (14.59)	212.5 (8.37)	157.1 (6.19)	90.9 (3.58)	73.9 (2.91)	59.4 (2.34)	1,714.4 (67.50)
Average precipitation days (≥ 1.0 mm)	5.8	8.2	8.8	8.3	8.0	12.7	11.8	9.8	9.3	5.7	7.4	7.0	102.8
Source: JMA
