= Ushizu, Saga =

Dissolved municipality in Saga prefecture, Japan

Ushizu (牛津町, Ushizu-chō) was a town located in Ogi District, Saga Prefecture, Japan. The status of Ushizu was changed from a village to a town on April 24, 1894.

As of 2003, the town had an estimated population of 10,429 and a density of 786.50 persons per km^{2}. The total area was 13.26 km^{2}.

On March 1, 2005, Ushizu, along with the towns of Ogi (former), Ashikari and Mikatsuki (all from Ogi District), was merged to create the city of Ogi.
