= Kubota, Saga =

Dissolved municipality in Saga district, Saga prefecture, Japan

Kubota (久保田町, Kubota-chō) was a town located in Saga District, Saga Prefecture, Japan. The status of Kubota was changed from a village to a town on April 1, 1967.

As of 2003, the town had an estimated population of 8,078 and a density of 561.36 persons per km^{2}. The total area was 14.39 km^{2}.

On October 1, 2007, Kubota, along with the towns of Higashiyoka and Kawasoe (all from Saga District), was merged into the expanded city of Saga.
