= Fuji, Saga =

Dissolved municipality in Saga prefecture, Japan

Coordinates: 33°22′26″N 130°12′30″E

Fuji (富士町, Fuji-chō) was a town located in Saga District, Saga Prefecture, Japan. The status of Fuji was changed from a village to a town on October 1, 1966.

As of 2005, the town had an estimated population of 4,797 and a density of 33.48 persons per km^{2}. The total area was 143.25 km^{2}.

On October 1, 2005, Fuji, along the towns of Morodomi and Yamato (all from Saga District), and the village of Mitsuse (from Kanzaki District), was merged into the expanded city of Saga.
