= Yamato, Saga =

Dissolved municipality in Saga prefecture, Japan

Yamato (大和町, Yamato-chō) was a town located in Saga District, Saga Prefecture, Japan. The town was established as a village in 1955, what later was elevated to town status in 1959.

As of 2003, the town had an estimated population of 22,105 and a density of 398.86 persons per km^{2}. The total area was 55.42 km^{2}.

On October 1, 2005, Yamato, along the towns of Fuji and Morodomi (all from Saga District), and the village of Mitsuse (from Kanzaki District), was merged into the expanded city of Saga.
