= Hizen, Saga =

Dissolved municipality in Saga prefecture, Japan

Hizen (肥前町, Hizen-chō) was a town located in the Higashimatsuura District of Saga Prefecture, Japan.

As of 2003, the town had an estimated population of 8,841 and a density of 189.48 persons per km^{2}. The total area was 46.66 km^{2}.

On January 1, 2005, Hizen, along with the towns of Chinzei, Hamatama, Kyūragi, Ōchi and Yobuko, and the village of Kitahata (all from Higashimatsuura District), was merged into the expanded city of Karatsu

The region has several beautiful waterfalls including Umezaki Falls, and the paired male and female: Odaki and Medaki Falls. To the south in Hizen-Mitsukoshi can be found the Fureai Nature School Hizen. Tsuru No Iwaya Temple includes many stone relief carvings of the Buddha on an overhanging cliff face. They are reminiscent of the similar Udonoiwaya site in nearby Ōchi.
