= Kyūragi, Saga =

Dissolved municipality in Saga prefecture, Japan

Kyūragi (厳木町, Kyūragi-machi) was a town located in the Higashimatsuura District of Saga Prefecture, Japan.

As of 2003, the town had an estimated population of 5,498 and a density of 89.91 persons per km^{2}. The total area was 61.15 km^{2}.

On January 1, 2005, Kyūragi, along with the towns of Chinzei, Hamatama, Hizen, Ōchi and Yobuko, and the village of Kitahata (all from Higashimatsuura District), was merged into the expanded city of Karatsu.

Kankyo Geijutsu No Mori Park at the foot of Mt Sakuraei is very beautiful in mid-November. Upstream from the nearby Kyūragi Dam one can see 300 plum trees (Feb-Mar) and 140 cherry trees (Mar-Apr) in blossom.

Kyūragi has a train station on the Karatsu Line of Kyushu Railway Company (JR Kyushu) running from Nishi-Karatsu Station in Karatsu to Kubota Station in Saga. The town has both a Junior and a Senior High School.

== Geography ==
Mountains: Tenzan (天山, Tenzan), Sakureizan (作礼山, Sakureizan), Onnayama (女山, Onnayama), Hachimandake (八幡岳, Hachimandake), Tsubakiyama (椿山, Tsubakiyama), Tōri'ishiyama (通石山, Tōri'ishiyama), Sasabaru (笹原峠, Sasabaru), Namise (波瀬峠, Namise)

Rivers: Kyūragi River (厳木川, Kyūragi-gawa), Matsūra River (松浦川, Matsūra-gawa)

Lakes and Marshes: Kyūragi Dam (厳木ダム, Kyūragi-damu), Tenzan Dam (天山ダム, Tenzan-damu)
