= Ashikari, Saga =

Dissolved municipality in Saga prefecture, Japan

Coordinates: 33°13′28″N 130°12′30″E

Ashikari (芦刈町, Ashikari-chō) was a town located in Ogi District, Saga Prefecture, Japan. The status of Ashikari was changed from a village to a town on April 1, 1967.

As of 2003, the town had an estimated population of 6,203 and a density of 372.11 persons per km^{2}. The total area was 16.67 km^{2}.

On March 1, 2005, Ashikari, along with the towns of Ogi (former), Mikatsuki and Ushizu (all from Ogi District), was merged to create the city of Ogi.
