= Mitsuse, Saga =

Former village located in Saga, Japan

Mitsuse (三瀬村, Mitsuse-mura) was a village located in Kanzaki District, Saga Prefecture, Japan.

As of 2003, the village had an estimated population of 1,578 and a density of 38.77 persons per km^{2}. The total area is 40.70 km^{2}.

On October 1, 2005, Mitsue, along the towns of Fuji, Morodomi and Yamato (all from Saga District), was merged into the expanded city of Saga.

Mitsuse is known for its greenery, cuisine, onsen, a dam, the Hokuzan Country Club, and various other outdoor activities.
