= Kitahata, Saga =

Dissolved municipality in Saga prefecture, Japan

Kitahata (北波多村, Kitahata-mura) was a village located in Higashimatsuura District, Saga Prefecture, Japan.

Kitahata was established in 1889 (Meiji 22) as a union of small hamlets. As of 2003, the village had an estimated population of 4,679 and a population density of 176.03 persons per km^{2}. The total area was 26.58 km^{2}.

On January 1, 2005, Kitahata, along with the towns of Chinzei, Hamatama, Hizen, Kyūragi, Ōchi and Yobuko (all from Higashimatsuura District), was merged into the expanded city of Karatsu.

The town hosts the Karatsu City Hospital Kitahata. Kitahata has a Junior High School. It also runs the Kitahata Furusato Summer Festival in July.
