= Ōchi, Saga =

Dissolved municipality in Saga prefecture, Japan

Coordinates: 33.342°N 130.020°E

Ōchi (相知町, Ōchi-chō) was a town located in the Higashimatsuura District of Saga Prefecture, Japan. Ōchi is also romanized as Ouchi and is often referred to that way in Japan. Ōchi was founded as Ōchi-mura (Ōchi-village) by the amalgamation of 16 smaller villages in 1889. It became Ōchi-town (Ōchi-chō) in 1935. Ōchi thus had its own town hall.

As of 2003, the town had an estimated population of 8,890 and a density of 136.60 persons per km². The total area was 65.08 km².

On January 1, 2005, Ōchi, along with the towns of Chinzei, Hamatama, Hizen, Kyūragi and Yobuko, and the village of Kitahata (all from Higashimatsuura District), were merged into the expanded city of Karatsu. The old town hall became the Ōchi branch office of Karatsu City Hall.

Ōchi contains the Memorial Hall of Hideo Murata who was a famous Japanese rōkyoku and enka singer. A major attraction are the Udonoiwaya Buddhist rock carvings. The scores of images of Buddha date from as early as the 7th century. Also popular is the nearby Mikaerinotaki (Looking Back Waterfall). The Warabino terraced rice fields, said to be the highest in Japan, are located on the northern slopes of Mount Hachimandake in Ōchi.

A major event is the harvest festival, the Ōchi-kunchi. This is a smaller version of the famous Karatsu Kunchi. Beginning on the 3rd Friday of October each year the town has a weekend in which there are a series of parades, day and night, where children and adults pull two large floats and dress in period costumes with much music and lively chanting.

Ōchi was coal mining town before World War II. These days the mine site has been transformed into Ōchi park, the Saga Royal golf course, and a sports complex. Ōchi has become something of a bedroom community, with considerable new housing developments on the north side of the Kyuragi river.

The main train station, Ōchi Station (相知駅), is on the Karatsu Line of Kyushu Railway Company (JR Kyushu) running from Nishi-Karatsu Station in Karatsu to Kubota Station in Saga. A smaller line, part of the Chikuhi Line, runs from Yamamoto Station of Karatsu City, through Nishi-Ōchi Station (West-Ōchi) to Imari Station in Imari City, a notable pottery centre in Saga Prefecture, along with Karatsu and Arita. The next station south from Nishi-Ōchi is Sari Station.

Ōchi is home to the 21 MW Saga Ouchi Solar farm just southwest of Oshigawa in southeast Ōchi. The solar farm is one of the biggest in Kyushu and opened in April 2018. It was announced in July 2025 that the solar farm would be augmented with a 40.35 MWh battery that can deliver up to 12 MW to assist with peak power demand .

== Environs ==
- Ōchi Post office
- Karatsu City Hall Ōchi Branch
- Ōchi Library
- Karatsu City Ōchi Elementary School
- Karatsu City Ōchi Junior High School
- Memorial Hall of Hideo Murata

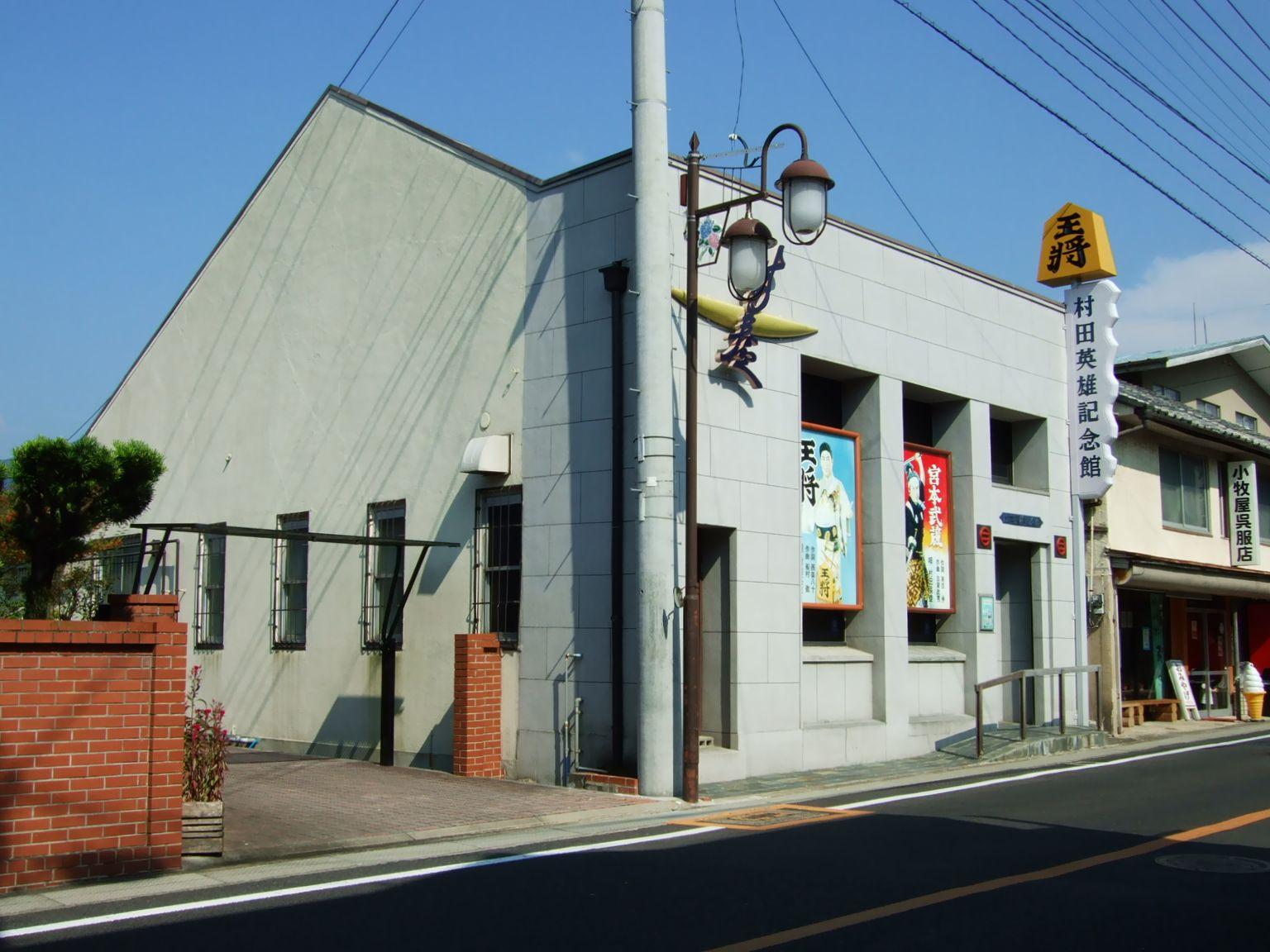
Memorial Hall of Hideo Murata in Ōchi, Saga
