= Chinzei, Saga =

Former town in Saga Prefecture, Japan

Chinzei (鎮西町, Chinzei-chō) was a town located in the Higashimatsuura District of Saga Prefecture, Japan.

As of 2003, the town had an estimated population of 7,203 and a density of 190.00 persons per km^{2}. The total area was 37.91 km^{2}.

On January 1, 2005, Chinzei, along with the towns of Hamatama, Hizen, Kyūragi, Ōchi and Yobuko, and the village of Kitahata (all from Higashimatsuura District), was merged into the expanded city of Karatsu.

Chinzei is very close to the ruins of the huge Nagoya Castle (map), from which Toyotomi Hideyoshi launched his invasions of Korea from 1592 to 1598. There is a Saga Prefecture Castle Museum there. To the north on the Hado peninsula is the Genkai Undersea Observatory Tower.
