= Yobuko, Saga =

Dissolved municipality in Higashimatsuura district, Saga prefecture, Japan

Yobuko (呼子町, Yobuko-chō) was a town in Karatsu. As of 2003, the town had an estimated population of 5,895 and a density of 809.75 persons per km^{2}. The total area was 7.28 km^{2}.

Until January 1, 2005, Yobuko was part of the Higashimatsuura District of Saga Prefecture, Japan. Yobuko, along with the towns of Chinzei, Hamatama, Hizen, Kyūragi and Ōchi, and the village of Kitahata (all from Higashimatsuura District), was then merged into the expanded city of Karatsu.

== In popular culture ==
- Keisuke Kinoshita's award-winning film Fireworks over the Sea was both filmed and set in Yobuko.
