= Higashiyoka-higata =

Tidal flat in Japan

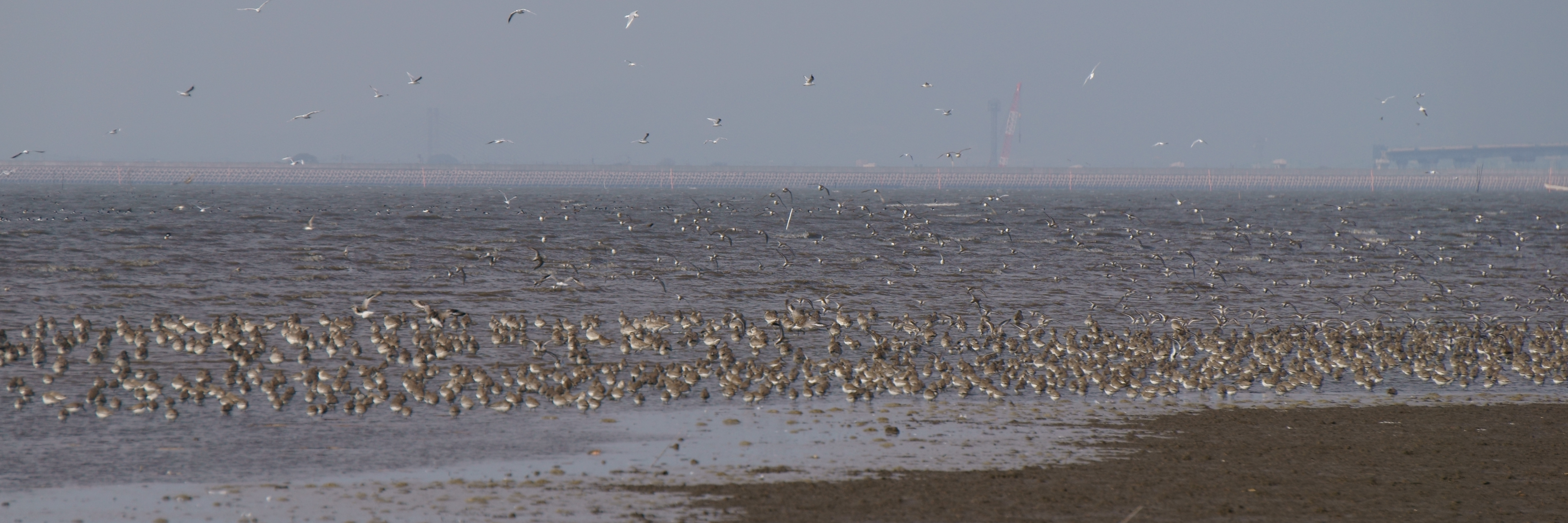
Flock of dunlin on the mudflat

Higashiyoka-higata (ja:東よか干潟) is a tidal flat in Japan at the north end of the Ariake Sea, in Saga prefecture. It is designated as a protected wetland under the Ramsar Convention.

Higashiyoka-higata is a stopover and a wintering site for several species of migratory waterbirds. About 7,000 migratory shorebirds are recorded from autumn to spring, including over 1% of the flyway populations of the grey plover (Pluvialis squatarola).

The tidal flat has seen conservation efforts managed by local clubs composed of residents of the nearby Saga City. The site is locally popular for birdwatching.

Some bird species that are known to be supported by the site are:

- Spoon-billed sandpiper (Eurynorhynchus pygmeus)
- Black-faced spoonbill (Platalea minor)
- Common shelduck (Tadorna tadorna)
- Far eastern curlew (Numenius madagascariensis)
- Saunders’s gull (Chroicocephalus saundersi)

== See also ==
- Arao-higata
