= Ogi District, Saga =

Former district in Saga prefecture, Japan

Ogi (小城郡, Ogi-gun) was a former district located in Saga Prefecture, Japan until end February 2005.

As of 2003, the district had an estimated population of 45,910 and a density of 478.98 persons per km^{2}. The total area was 95.85 km^{2}.

== Former towns and villages ==
- Ashikari
- Mikatsuki
- Ogi
- Ushizu

== Merger ==
- On March 1, 2005 - the former town of Ogi absorbed the towns of Ashikari, Mikatsuki and Ushizu to create the city of Ogi. Ogi District was dissolved as a result of this merger.
