= Higashimatsuura District =

District in Saga prefecture, Japan

Coordinates: 33°28′N 129°53′E

Higashimatsuura District in Saga Prefecture

Higashimatsuura (東松浦郡, Higashimatsuura-gun) is a district located in Saga Prefecture, Japan. At the present it has only one town.

As of April 1, 2021, the district has an estimated population of 5,211 and a density of 145 persons per square kilometre. The total area is 35.92 square kilometres (13.87 square miles).

== Municipalities ==
- Genkai, whose borders are effectively the same as Higashimatsuura District's.

== History ==
- In 1878, Higashimatsuura District split with Matsuura District in Nagasaki Prefecture, along with Nishimatsuura District, Kitamatsuura District, and Minamimatsuura District.
- In 1883 Higashimatsuura District (along with Nishimatsuura District) became a part of Saga Prefecture.
- On January 1, 2005, Kitahata, Chinzei, Hamatama, Hizen, Kyūragi, Ōchi and Yobuko (all from Higashimatsuura District) were merged into the expanded city of Karatsu.

Before 1889	April 1, 1889	1889 - 1944		1945 - 1959	1960 - 1989	1989–Present	Present
	Nanayama	Nanayama		Nanayama	Nanayama	January 1, 2006; Incorporated into Karatsu	Karatsu
	Karatsu (town)	Karatsu (town)	January 1, 1932; City status gained Karatsu	Karatsu	Karatsu	January 1, 2005; Karatsu	Karatsu
	Mitsushima	January 1, 1924; Incorporated into Karatsu (town)	January 1, 1932; City status gained Karatsu	Karatsu	Karatsu	January 1, 2005; Karatsu	Karatsu
	Karatsu (village)	February 1, 1931; Incorporated into Karatsu (town)	January 1, 1932; City status gained Karatsu	Karatsu	Karatsu	January 1, 2005; Karatsu	Karatsu
	Sashi	September 1, 1935; Town status gained Sashi	November 3, 1941; Incorporated into Karatsu	Karatsu	Karatsu	January 1, 2005; Karatsu	Karatsu
	Onizuka	Onizuka		November 1, 1954; Incorporated into Karatsu	Karatsu	January 1, 2005; Karatsu	Karatsu
	Minato	Minato		November 1, 1954; Incorporated into Karatsu	Karatsu	January 1, 2005; Karatsu	Karatsu
	Kagami	Kagami		November 1, 1954; Incorporated into Karatsu	Karatsu	January 1, 2005; Karatsu	Karatsu
	Kuri	Kuri		November 1, 1954; Incorporated into Karatsu	Karatsu	January 1, 2005; Karatsu	Karatsu
	Ōchi	September 1, 1935; Town status gained Ōchi		Ōchi	Ōchi	January 1, 2005; Karatsu	Karatsu
	Kyūragi	Kyūragi		May 3, 1952; Town status gained Kyūragi	Kyūragi	January 1, 2005; Karatsu	Karatsu
	Nagoya	January 1, 1922; Kanji renaming Nagoya		September 30, 1956; Chinzei	Chinzei	January 1, 2005; Karatsu	Karatsu
	Uchiage	Uchiage		September 30, 1956; Chinzei	Chinzei	January 1, 2005; Karatsu	Karatsu
	Hamasaki	July 1, 1922; Town status gained Hamasaki		September 30, 1956; Hamasaki-Tamashima	November 1, 1966; Renaming; Hamatama	January 1, 2005; Karatsu	Karatsu
	Ōmura	July 28, 1896; Renaming; Tamashima		September 30, 1956; Hamasaki-Tamashima	November 1, 1966; Renaming; Hamatama	January 1, 2005; Karatsu	Karatsu
	Yobuko	August 1, 1928; Town status gained Yobuko		Yobuko	Yobuko	January 1, 2005; Karatsu	Karatsu
	Kitahata	Kitahata		Kitahata	Kitahata	January 1, 2005; Karatsu	Karatsu
	Irino	Irino		January 1, 1958; Town status gained Hizen	Hizen	January 1, 2005; Karatsu	Karatsu
	Kirigo	Kirigo		December 21, 1957; Incorporated into Irino	Hizen	January 1, 2005; Karatsu	Karatsu
	Kirigo	Kirigo		December 31, 1957; Incorporated into Karatsu		January 1, 2005; Karatsu	Karatsu
	Kirigo	Kirigo		December 31, 1957; Incorporated into Genkai	Genkai	Genkai	Genkai
	Ariura	Ariura		September 30, 1956; Genkai	Genkai	Genkai	Genkai
	Chiga	Chiga		September 30, 1956; Genkai	Genkai	Genkai	Genkai
