= Ōgi Station (Saga) =

Train station on the Matsuura Railway line in Saga Prefecture, Japan

Ōgi Station 大木駅
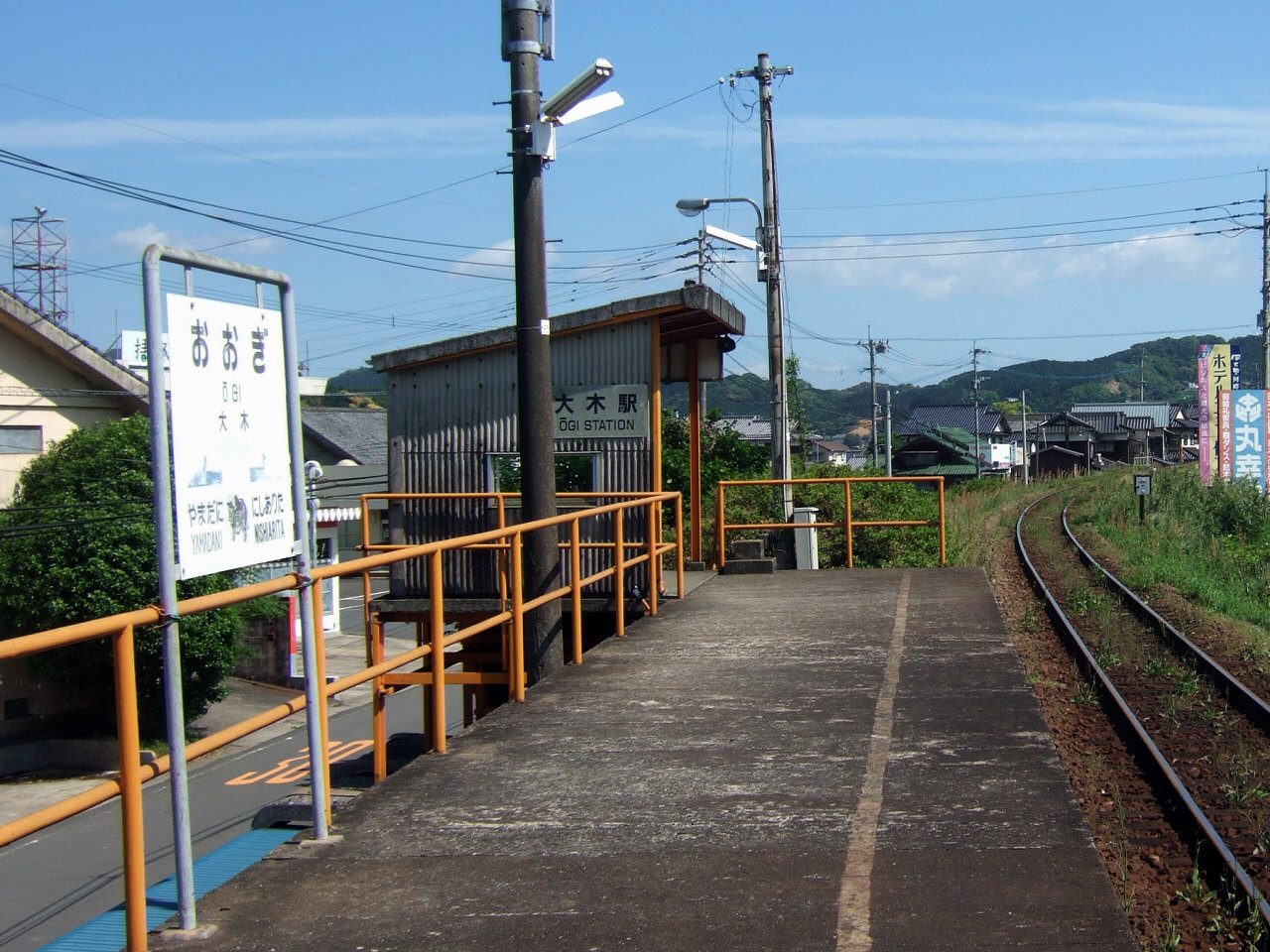
- Station platform in May 2008

General information
- Location: Arita, Nishimatsuura District, Saga Prefecture; Japan
- Coordinates: 33°13′18.08″N 129°51′0.19″E
- Operator: Matsuura Railway
- Line: ■ Nishi-Kyūshū Line
- Distance: 6.1 km from Arita Station
- Platforms: 1
- Tracks: 1

Construction
- Structure type: At-grade

Other information
- Website: Official website (in Japanese)

History
- Opened: 1 April 1960; 66 years ago
- Original company: Japanese National Railways
Location
- Location within Saga Prefecture Location within Japan

Ōgi Station (大木駅, Ōgi-eki) is a train station located in Arita, Saga Prefecture, Japan. It is on the Nishi-Kyūshū Line which has been operated by the third-sector Matsuura Railway since 1988.

== Lines ==
- Matsuura Railway
  - Nishi-Kyūshū Line

Trains on this branch terminate at either Arita or Imari. Travellers can transfer at Imari for local trains to Saza, then onto a local or rapid train to Sasebo. It is 6.1 km from Arita.

== Station layout ==
The station consists of one ground-level side platform with a bi-directional track.

== Adjacent stations ==
«	Service	»
Nishi-Kyūshū Line
Nishi-Arita	Local	Yamadani

== See also ==
- List of railway stations in Japan
