= Nishi-Arita Station =

Train station on the Matsuura Railway line in Saga Prefecture, Japan

Nishi-Arita Station 西有田駅
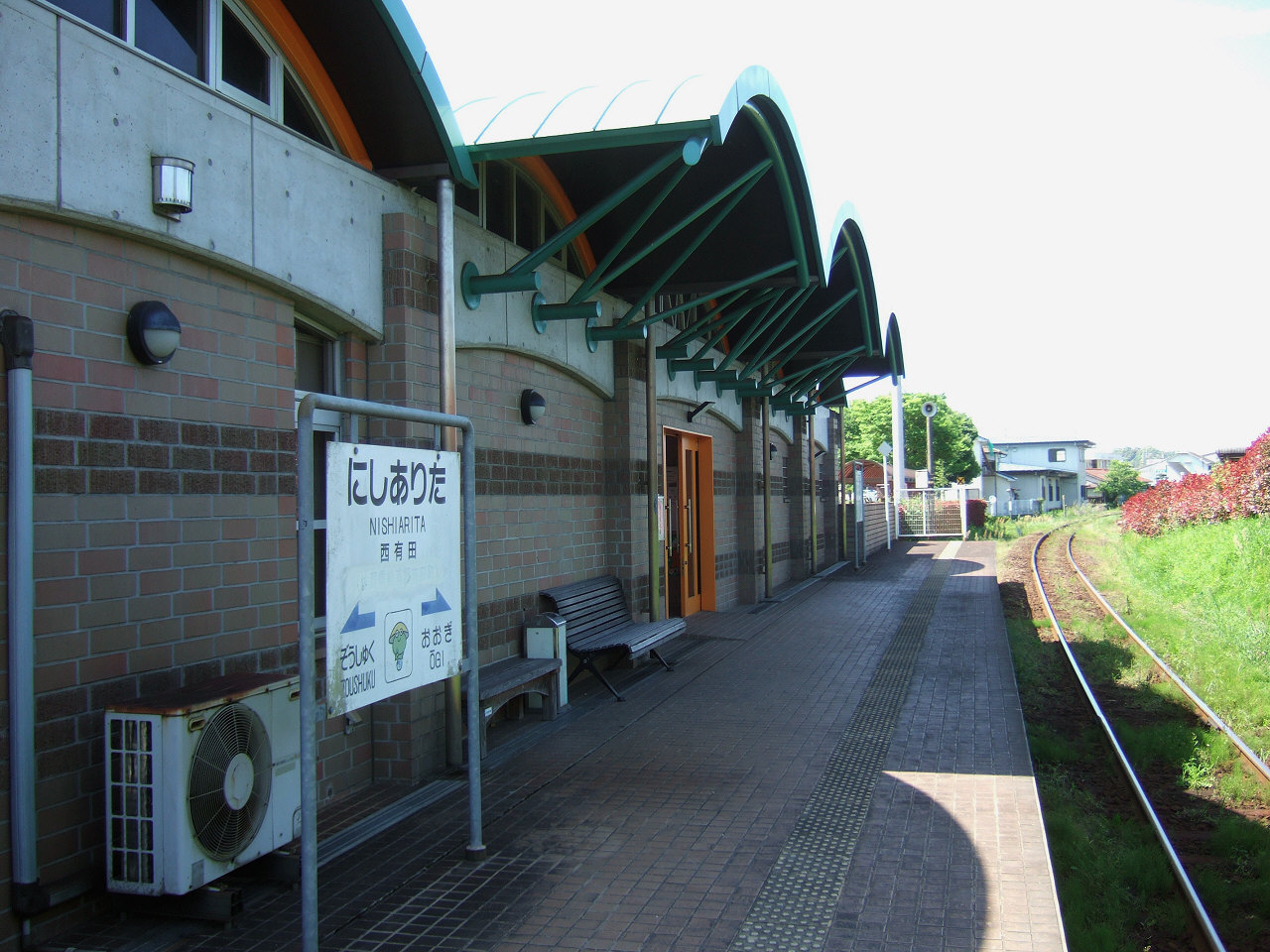
- Station platform in May 2008

General information
- Location: Arita, Nishimatsuura District, Saga Prefecture; Japan
- Coordinates: 33°12′36.35″N 129°51′0.01″E
- Operator: Matsuura Railway
- Line: ■ Nishi-Kyūshū Line
- Distance: 4.8 km from Arita Station
- Platforms: 1
- Tracks: 1

Construction
- Structure type: At-grade

Other information
- Website: Official website (in Japanese)

History
- Opened: 16 March 1996; 30 years ago
- Original company: Matsuura Railway
Location
- Location within Saga Prefecture Location within Japan

Nishi-Arita Station (西有田駅, Nishi-Arita-eki; にしありたえき) is a train station located in Arita, Saga Prefecture, Japan. It is on the Nishi-Kyūshū Line which has been operated by the third-sector Matsuura Railway since 1988.

== Lines ==
- Matsuura Railway
  - Nishi-Kyūshū Line

Trains on this branch terminate at either Arita or Imari. Travellers can transfer at Imari for local trains to Saza, then onto a local or rapid train to Sasebo. It is 4.8 km from Arita.

== Station layout ==
The station consists of one ground-level side platform with a bi-directional track.

== Adjacent stations ==
«	Service	»
Nishi-Kyūshū Line
Zōshuku	Local	Ōgi

== See also ==
- List of railway stations in Japan
