= Nishikoba Station =

Train station on the Matsuura Railway line in Nagasaki Prefecture, Japan

Nishikoba Station 西木場駅
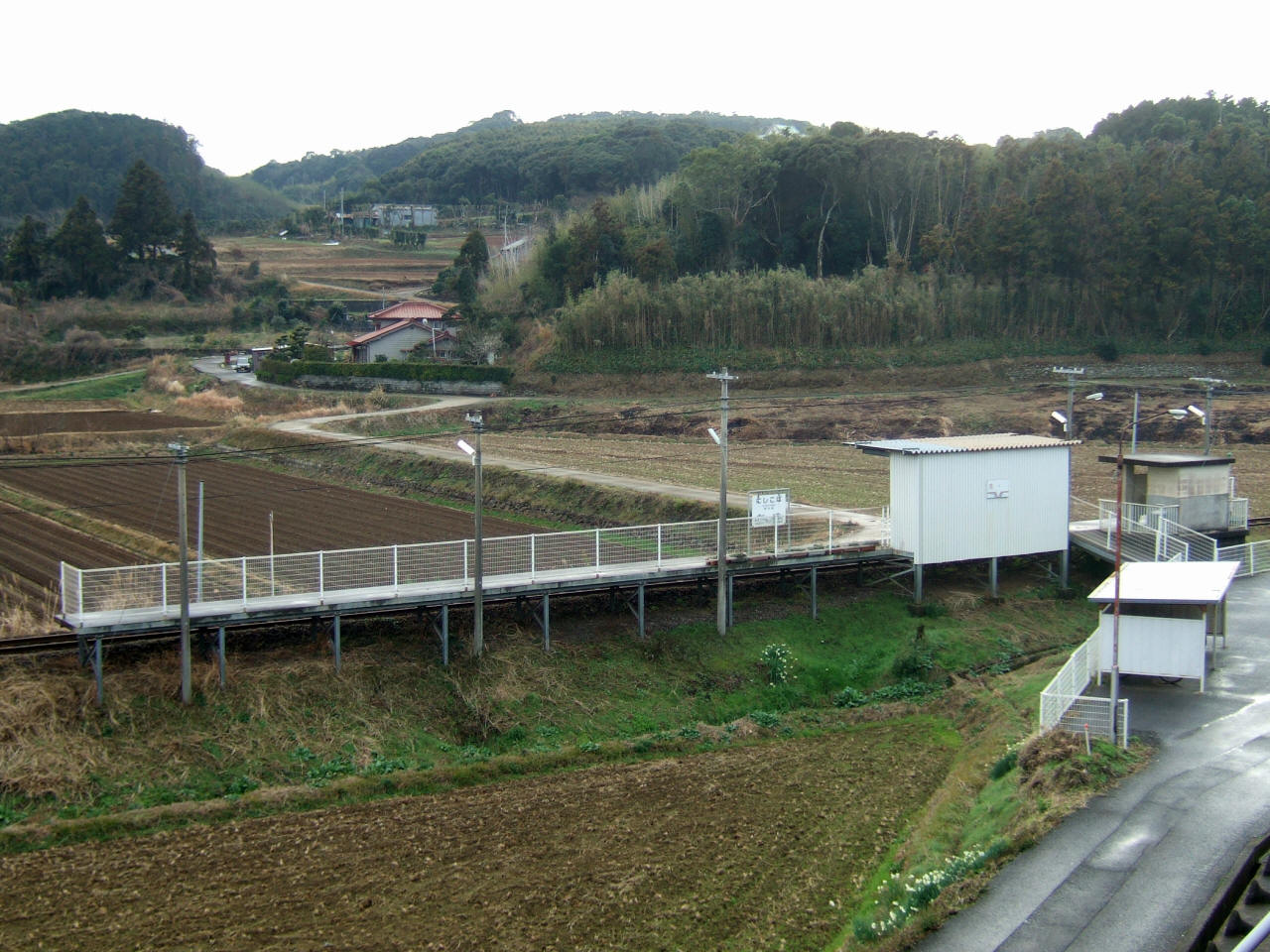
- Station in February 2008

General information
- Location: Matsuura, Nagasaki Prefecture; Japan
- Coordinates: 33°21′20.66″N 129°38′17.70″E
- Operator: Matsuura Railway
- Line: ■ Nishi-Kyūshū Line
- Distance: 44.4 km from Arita Station
- Platforms: 1
- Tracks: 1

Construction
- Structure type: At-grade

Other information
- Website: Official website (in Japanese)

History
- Opened: 16 March 1991; 35 years ago
- Original company: Matsuura Railway
Location
- Location within Nagasaki Prefecture Location within Japan

Nishikoba Station (西木場駅, Nishikoba-eki; にしこばえき) is a train station located in Matsuura, Nagasaki Prefecture, Japan. It is on the Nishi-Kyūshū Line which has been operated by the third-sector Matsuura Railway since 1988.

== Lines ==
- Matsuura Railway
  - Nishi-Kyūshū Line

Trains on this branch terminate at either Imari or Saza. Travellers can transfer at Imari for local trains to Arita, or either a local or rapid train from Saza to Sasebo. It is 44.4 km from Arita.

== Station layout ==
The station consists of one ground-level side platform with a bi-directional track.

== Adjacent stations ==
«	Service	»
Nishi-Kyūshū Line
Mikuriya	Local	Higashi-Tabira

== See also ==
- List of railway stations in Japan
