= Mikuriya Station (Nagasaki) =

Railway station in Matsuura, Japan

Coordinates: 33.3659°N 129.6624°E

Mikuriya Station 御厨駅
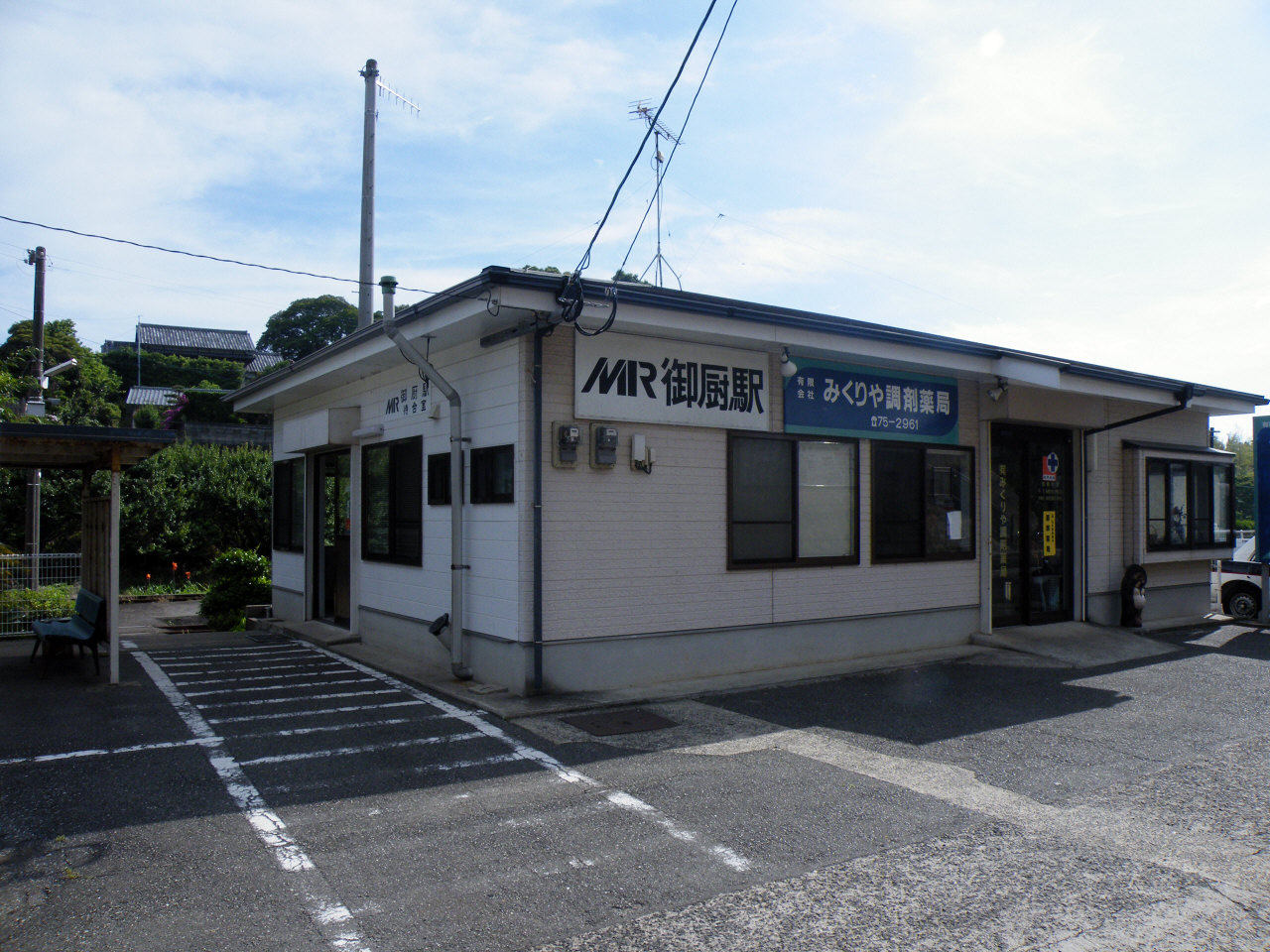

General information
- Location: Matsuura, Nagasaki （松浦市御厨町里免） Japan
- Operator: Matsuura Railway
- Line: Nishi-Kyūshū Line

History
- Opened: 1935
- Former names: Hizen-Mikuriya (until 1988)

Passengers
- 2005: 446 daily
Location

Mikuriya Station (御厨駅, Mikuriya-eki) is the railway station in Mikuriya-machi Sato-men, Matsuura, Nagasaki Prefecture. It is operated by Matsuura Railway and is on the Nishi-Kyūshū Line.

== Lines ==
- Matsuura Railway
  - Nishi-Kyūshū Line

== Adjacent stations ==
←	Service	→
Nishi-Kyūshū Line
Matsuura Hatsudensho-mae	Local	Nishikoba

== Station layout ==
The station is at ground level with one island platform and two tracks.

The platform is attached to the station building, which is at a railroad crossing. A waiting room is next to the compounding of medicines drugstore which borrowed a station site, and was established and can use the inside in the business hours of the drugstore.

== Environs ==
- National Route 204
- Matsuura City Office Mikuriya Branch
- Mikuriya Post Office
- Oshibuchi Hospital
- A-COOP Mikuriya (Supermarket)

== History ==
- August 6, 1935 - Opens for business as Hizen-Mikuriya Station (肥前御厨駅, Hizen-Mikuriya-eki).
- April 1, 1987 - Railways privatize and this station is inherited by JR Kyushu.
- April 1, 1988 - This station is inherited by Matsuura Railway and renamed to present name.
