= Matsuura Hatsudensho-mae Station =

Train station in Japan

Matsuura-Hatsudenshomae Station 松浦発電所前駅
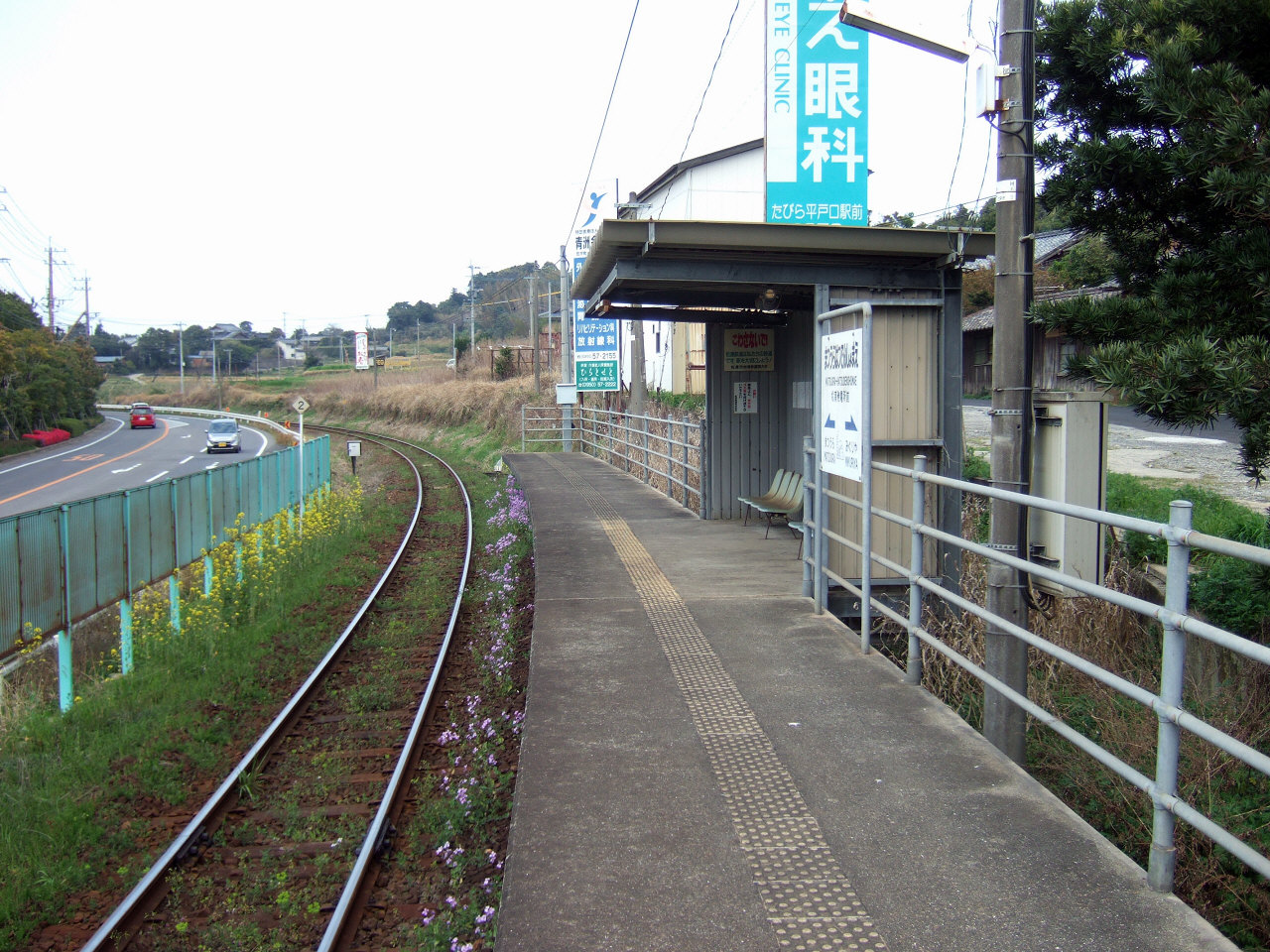
- Station platform in April 2008

General information
- Location: Matsuura, Nagasaki Prefecture; Japan
- Coordinates: 33°20′49.23″N 129°41′8.21″E
- Operator: Matsuura Railway
- Line: ■ Nishi-Kyūshū Line
- Distance: 38.2 km from Arita Station
- Platforms: 1
- Tracks: 1

Construction
- Structure type: At-grade

Other information
- Website: Official website (in Japanese)

History
- Opened: 11 March 1989; 37 years ago
- Original company: Matsuura Railway
Location
- Location within Nagasaki Prefecture Location within Japan

Matsuura-Hatsudenshomae Station (松浦発電所前駅, Matsuura-Hatsudenshomae-eki; まつうらはつでんしょまええき) is a train station located in Matsuura, Nagasaki Prefecture, Japan. It is on the Nishi-Kyūshū Line which has been operated by the third-sector Matsuura Railway since 1988.

== Lines ==
- Matsuura Railway
  - Nishi-Kyūshū Line

Trains on this branch terminate at either Imari or Saza. Travellers can transfer at Imari for local trains to Arita, or either a local or rapid train from Saza to Sasebo. It is 38.2 kilometres (23.7 mi) from Arita.

== See also ==
- List of railway stations in Japan
