= Emukae-Shikamachi Station =

Railway station in Sasebo, Japan

Coordinates: 33.3069°N 129.6272°E

Emukae-Shikamachi Station 江迎鹿町駅
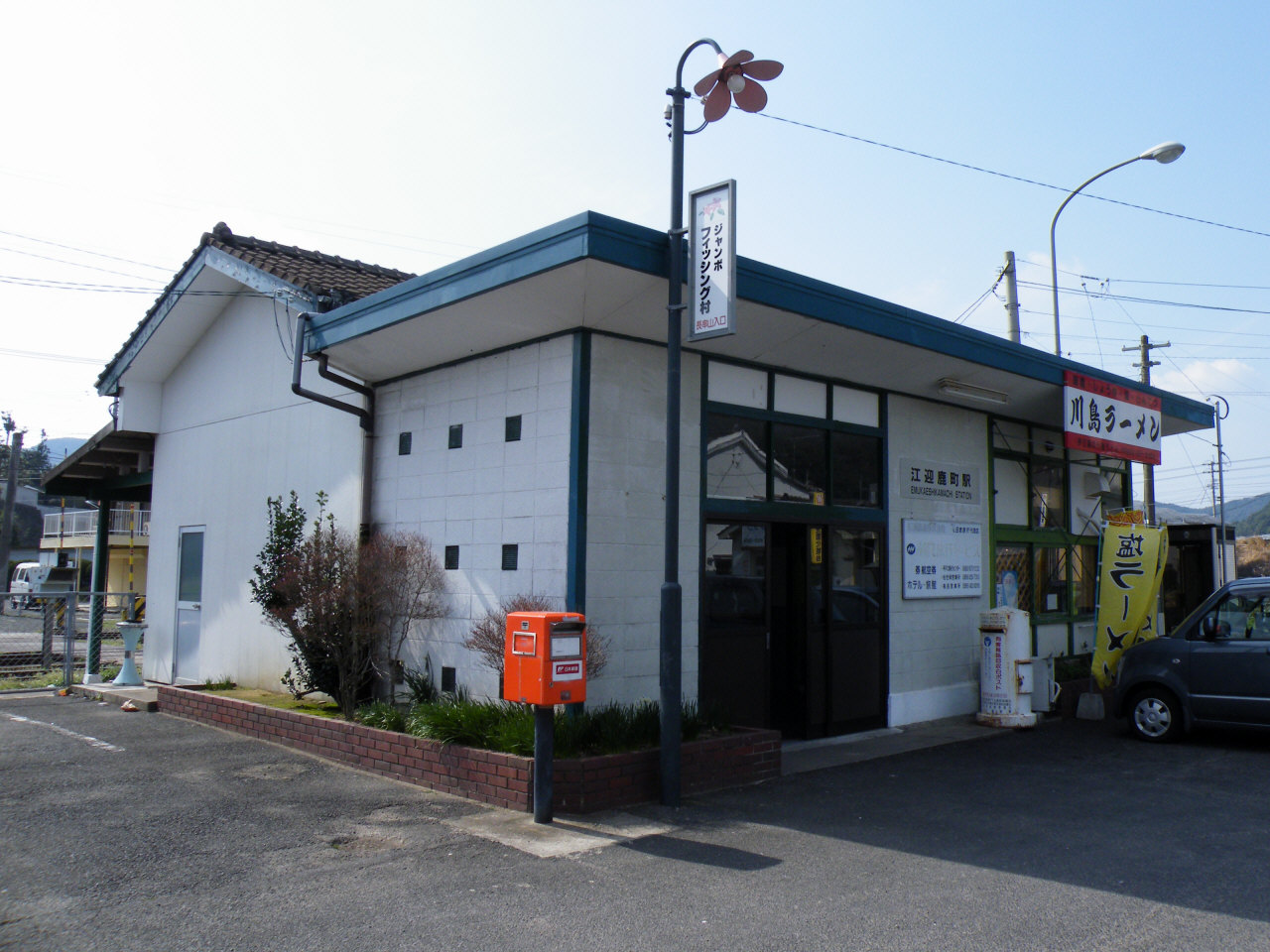

General information
- Location: Shimamachi-chō Fukae-men, Sasebo, Nagasaki （佐世保市鹿町町深江免） Japan
- Operator: Matsuura Railway
- Line: Nishi-Kyūshū Line

History
- Opened: 1939
- Former names: Emukae (until 1988)

Passengers
- 2005: 677 daily
Location

Emukae-Shikamachi Station (江迎鹿町駅, Emukae-Shikamachi-eki) is the railway station in Shimamachi-chō Fukae-men, Sasebo, Nagasaki Prefecture.It is operated by Matsuura Railway and is on the Nishi-Kyūshū Line.

== Lines ==
- Matsuura Railway
  - Nishi-Kyūshū Line

== Adjacent stations ==
←	Service	→
Matsuura Railway
Suetachibana	Nishi-Kyūshū Line	Takaiwa

== Station layout ==
Emukae-Shikamachi Station has one ground level island platform serving two tracks.

== Environs ==
- National Route 204
- Emukae Bus Center (Saihi Motor)
- Emukae Administration Center
- Emukae Post Office
- Emukae Police Station
- Saihi Driving School
- Shikamachi Technical High School

== History ==
- 25 January 1939 - Opens for business as Emukae Station (江迎駅, Emukae-eki).
- 1 April 1987 - Railways privatize and this station is inherited by JR Kyushu.
- 1 April 1988 - This station is inherited by Matsuura Railway and renamed to present name.
