= Zōshuku Station =

Railway station in Arita, Saga prefecture, Japan

Zōshuku Station 蔵宿駅
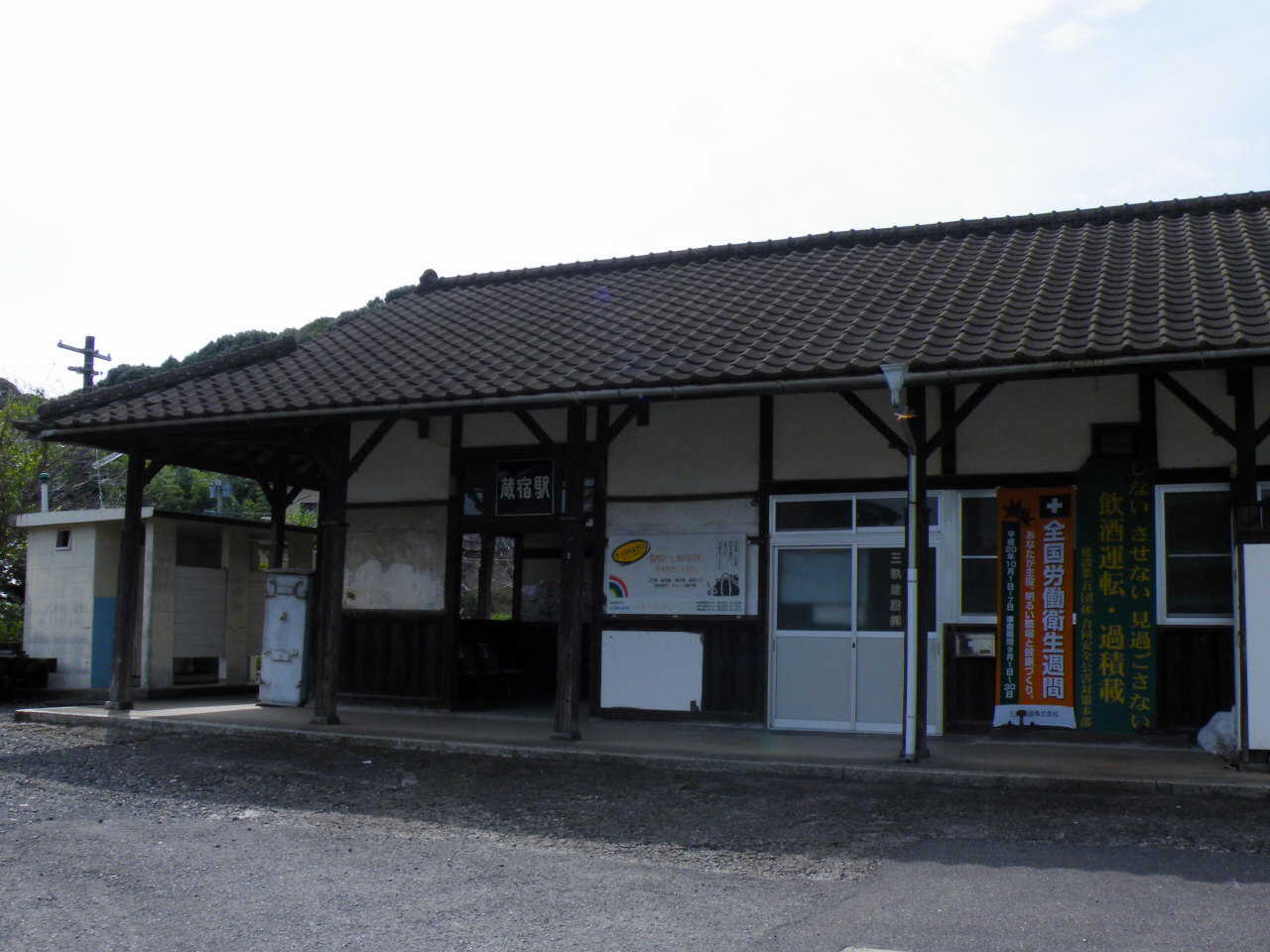
- Zōshuku Station

General information
- Location: Ōaza Zōshuku, Arita, Nishimatsuura, Saga （西松浦郡有田町大字蔵宿） Japan
- Coordinates: 33°12′08″N 129°51′02″E
- Operator: Matsuura Railway
- Line: Nishi-Kyūshū Line
- Connections

History
- Opened: 1898

Passengers
- 2005: 28 daily
Location

Zōshuku Station (蔵宿駅, Zōshuku-eki) is a railway station in Ōaza Magarikawa, Arita Town, Saga Prefecture. It is operated by Matsuura Railway and is on the Nishi-Kyūshū Line.

== Lines ==
- Matsuura Railway
  - Nishi-Kyūshū Line

== Adjacent stations ==
←	Service	→
Nishi-Kyūshū Line
Kurogō	Local	Nishi-Arita

== History ==
- August 7, 1898 - Opens for business by Imari Railway.
- December 1, 1898 - Kyushu Railway merges Imari Railway.
- July 1, 1907 - The Railroad Ministry nationalizes all lines of Kyushu Railway.
- 1913–Present station building is established.
- April 1, 1987 - Railways privatize and this station is inherited by JR Kyushu.
- April 1, 1988 - This station is inherited by Matsuura Railway.
