= Kawahigashi Station =

Kawahigashi Station is the name of two train stations in Japan:

- Kawahigashi Station (Fukushima)
- Kawahigashi Station (Saga)
