= Nishi-Tabira Station =

Railway station in Hirado, Japan

Coordinates: 33.3451°N 129.5902°E

Nishi-Tabira Station 西田平駅
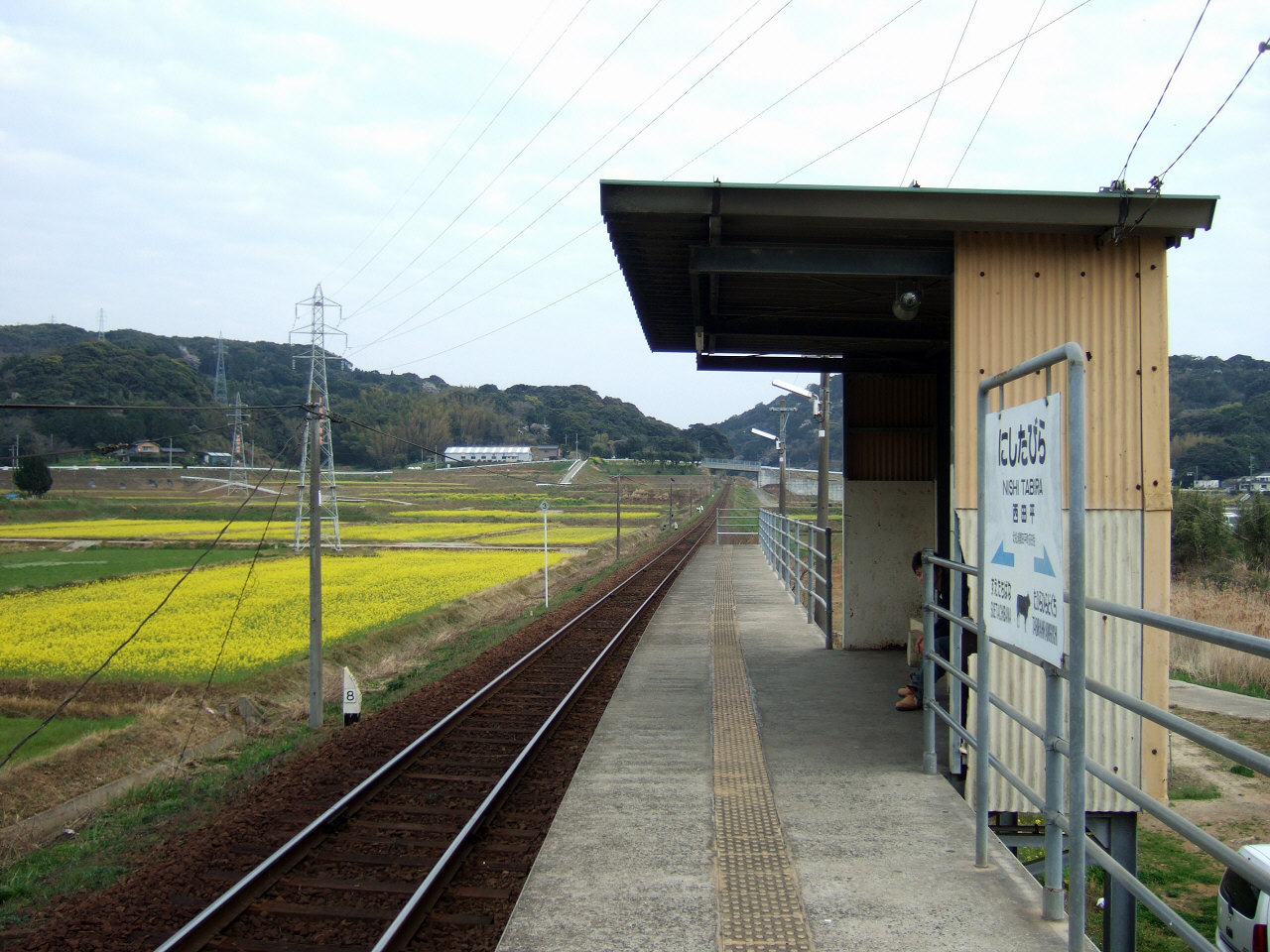

General information
- Location: Tabira-cho Ogita-men, Hirado, Nagasaki （平戸市田平町荻田免） Japan
- Operator: Matsuura Railway
- Line: Nishi-Kyūshū Line

History
- Opened: 1989

Passengers
- 2005: 446 daily
Location

Nishi-Tabira Station (西田平駅, Nishi-Tabira-eki) is the railway station in Tabira-cho Ogita-men, Hirado City, Nagasaki Prefecture. It is operated by Matsuura Railway and is on the Nishi-Kyūshū Line.

== Lines ==
- Matsuura Railway
  - Nishi-Kyūshū Line

== Adjacent stations ==
←	Service	→
Nishi-Kyūshū Line
Tabira-Hiradoguchi	Local	Suetachibana

== Station layout ==
The station is on a bank with a single side platform.

== Environs ==
Rapeseed flowers which a local farming family planted in the rice field around the station blooms in spring.

- National Route 204
- Hokusho Agricultural High School
- Tabira Insect Park
- Tabira Catholic Church

== History ==
- March 11, 1989 - Opens for business.
