= Midaibashi Station =

Train station on the Matsuura Railway line in Saga Prefecture, Japan

Midaibashi Station 三代橋駅
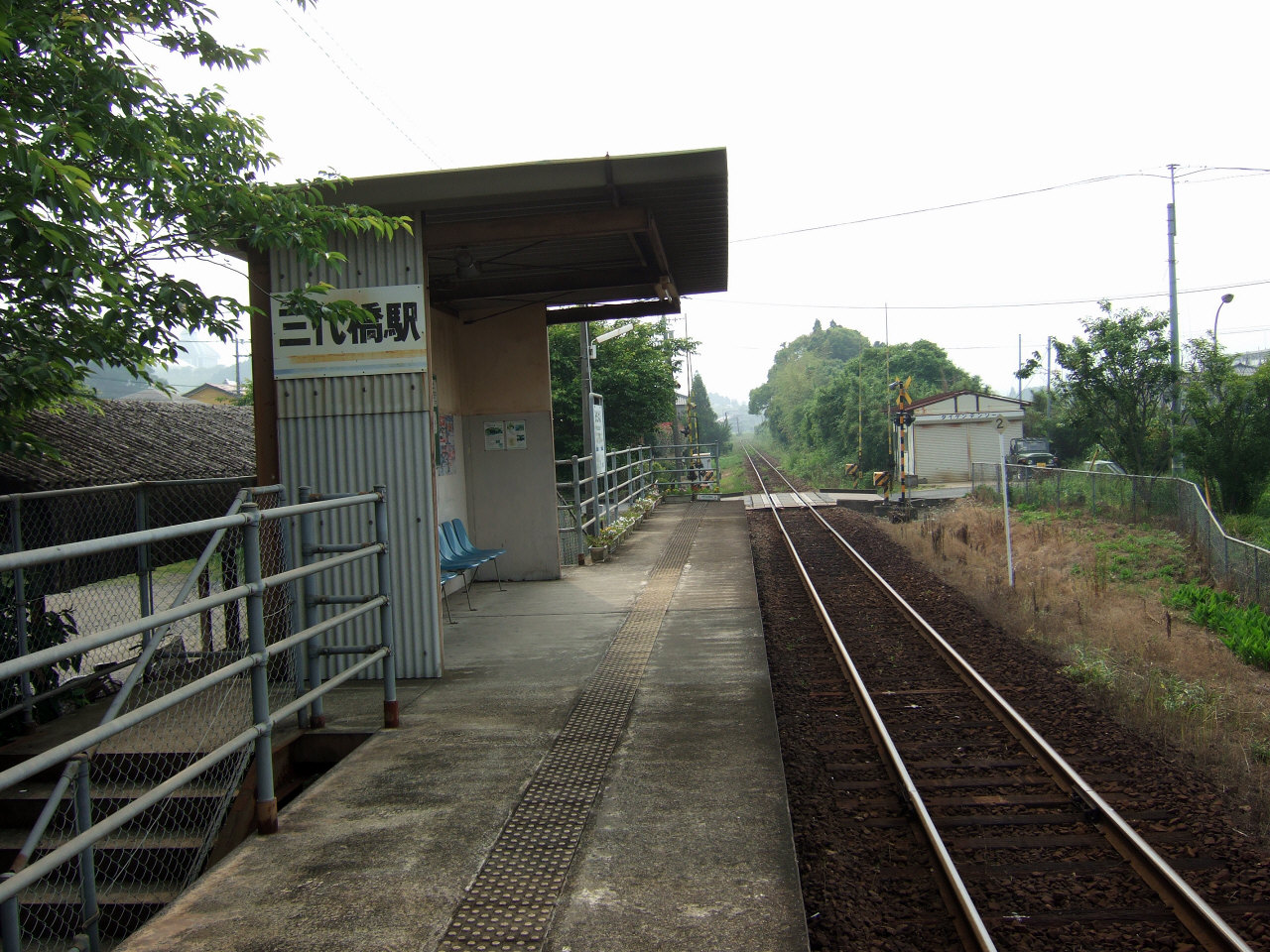
- Station platform in June 2008

General information
- Location: Ko Nanbaru, Arita-cho, Nishimatsuura-gun, Saga-ken 844-0027; Japan
- Coordinates: 33°11′20.98″N 129°51′56.27″E
- Operator: Matsuura Railway
- Line: ■ Nishi-Kyūshū Line
- Distance: 1.7 km from Arita Station
- Platforms: 1
- Tracks: 1

Construction
- Structure type: At-grade

Other information
- Website: Official website (in Japanese)

History
- Opened: 11 March 1989; 37 years ago

Passengers
- FY 2019: 58
Location
- Location within Saga Prefecture Location within Japan

Midaibashi Station (三代橋駅, Midaibashi-eki; みだいばしえき) is a passenger train station located in the city of Arita, Saga Prefecture, Japan. It is on the Nishi-Kyūshū Line which is operated by the third-sector Matsuura Railway since 1988.

== Lines ==
The station is served by the Nishi-Kyūshū Line and is located 1.7 km from the starting point of the line at Arita.

== Station layout ==
The station consists of one ground-level side platform with a bi-directional track. There is no station building, but only a shelter on the platform. The station is unattended.

== Adjacent stations ==
«	Service	»
Nishi-Kyūshū Line
Arita	Local	Kurogō

== History ==
The station was opened on 11 March 1989.

== Passenger statistics ==
In fiscal 2019, the station was used by 58 passengers daily.

== Surrounding area ==
- Saga Prefecture Ceramics Technology Center
- Arita Akasaka Baseball Stadium

== See also ==
- List of railway stations in Japan
