= Higashi-Tabira Station =

Railway station in Hirado, Nagasaki prefecture, Japan

Higashi-Tabira Station 東田平駅
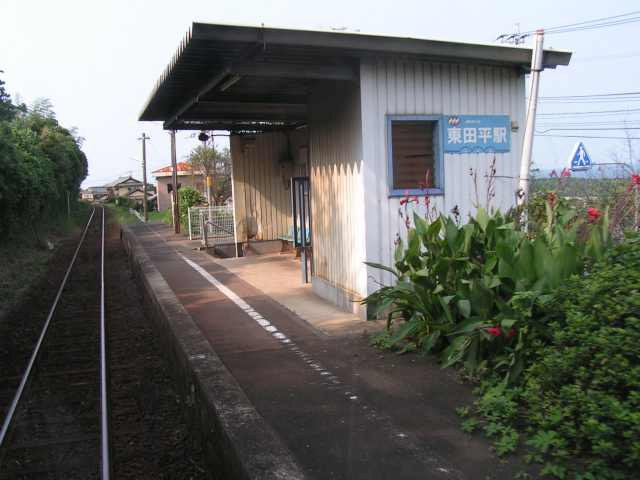
- Higashi-Tabira Station

General information
- Location: Hirado, Nagasaki; Japan
- Coordinates: 33°21′29″N 129°37′23″E
- Operator: Matsuura Railway
- Line: Nishi-Kyūshū Line

History
- Opened: 1935
- Former names: Tabira (until 1989)

Passengers
- 2005: 24 daily
Location

Higashi-Tabira Station (東田平駅, Higashi-Tabira-eki) is a railway station in Tabira-chō Ozaki-men, Hirado, Nagasaki Prefecture. It is operated by Matsuura Railway and is on the Nishi-Kyūshū Line.

== Lines ==
- Matsuura Railway
  - Nishi-Kyūshū Line

== Adjacent stations ==
| ← | Service | → |
Nishi-Kyūshū Line
| Nishikoba | Local | Naka-Tabira |

== Station layout ==
Higashi-Tabira Station has one ground level side platform.

== Environs ==
- National Route 204

== History ==
- 1935-08-06 - Opens for business as Tabira Station.
- 1987-04-01 - Railways privatize and this station is inherited by JR Kyushu.
- 1988-04-01 - This station is inherited by Matsuura Railway.
- 1989-03-11 - This Station is renamed to present name.
