= Arita, Saga =

Arita 有田町
- Town
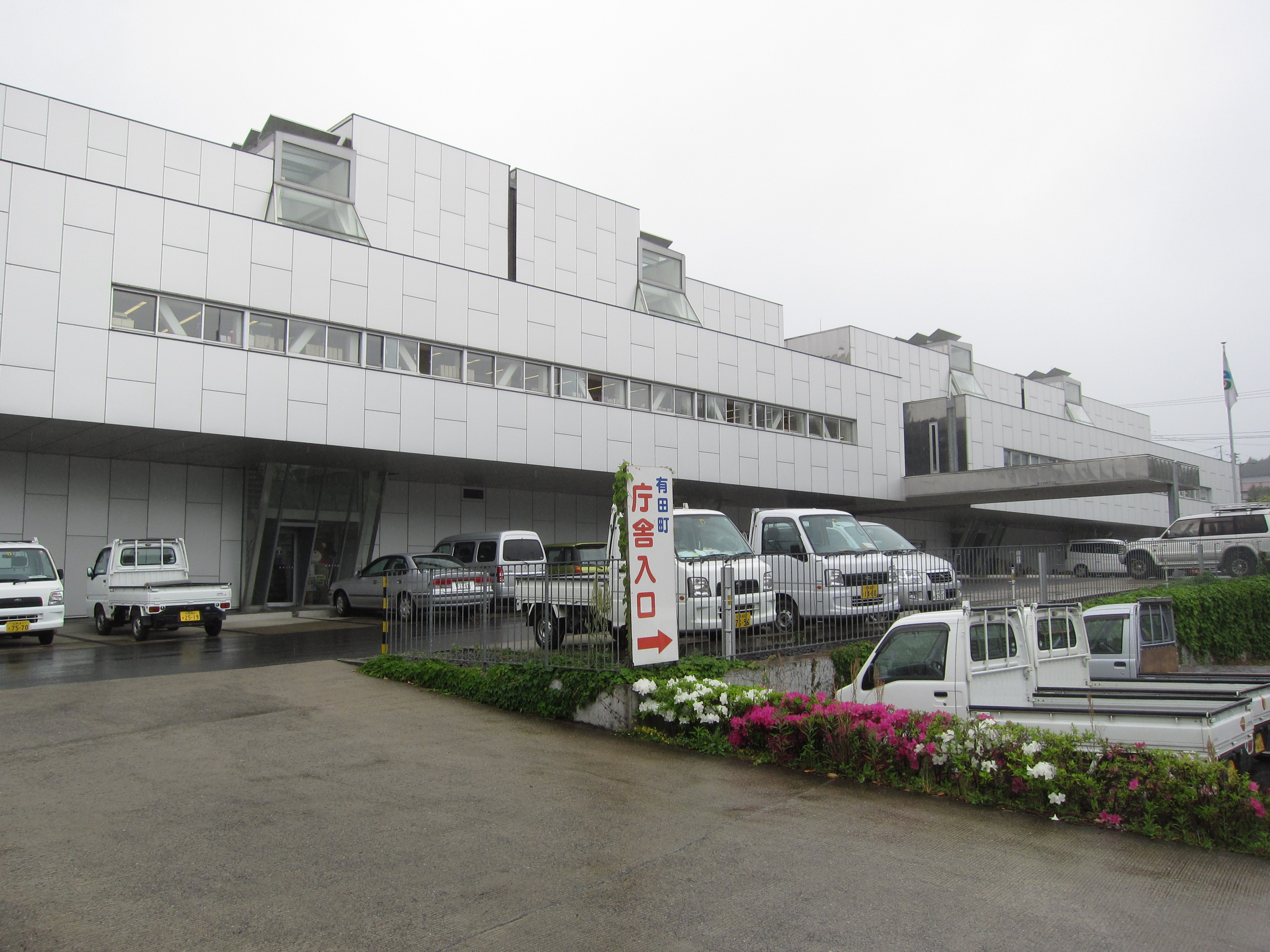
- Arita Town Hall

- Flag Seal
- Interactive map of Arita
- Coordinates: 33°12′38″N 129°50′57″E
- Country: Japan
- Region: Kyūshū
- Prefecture: Saga
- District: Nishimatsuura

Area
  - Total: 65.85 km^{2} (25.42 sq mi)

Population (May 31, 2020)
  - Total: 18,634
  - Density: 283.0/km^{2} (732.9/sq mi)
- Time zone: UTC+9 (JST)
- Phone number: 0955-46-2111
- Address: 2202 Tachibe, Arita-chō, Nishimatsuura-gun, Saga-ken 849-4153
- Website: Official website
- Symbols
- Flower: Prunus serrulata
- Tree: Ginkgo biloba Quercus glauca

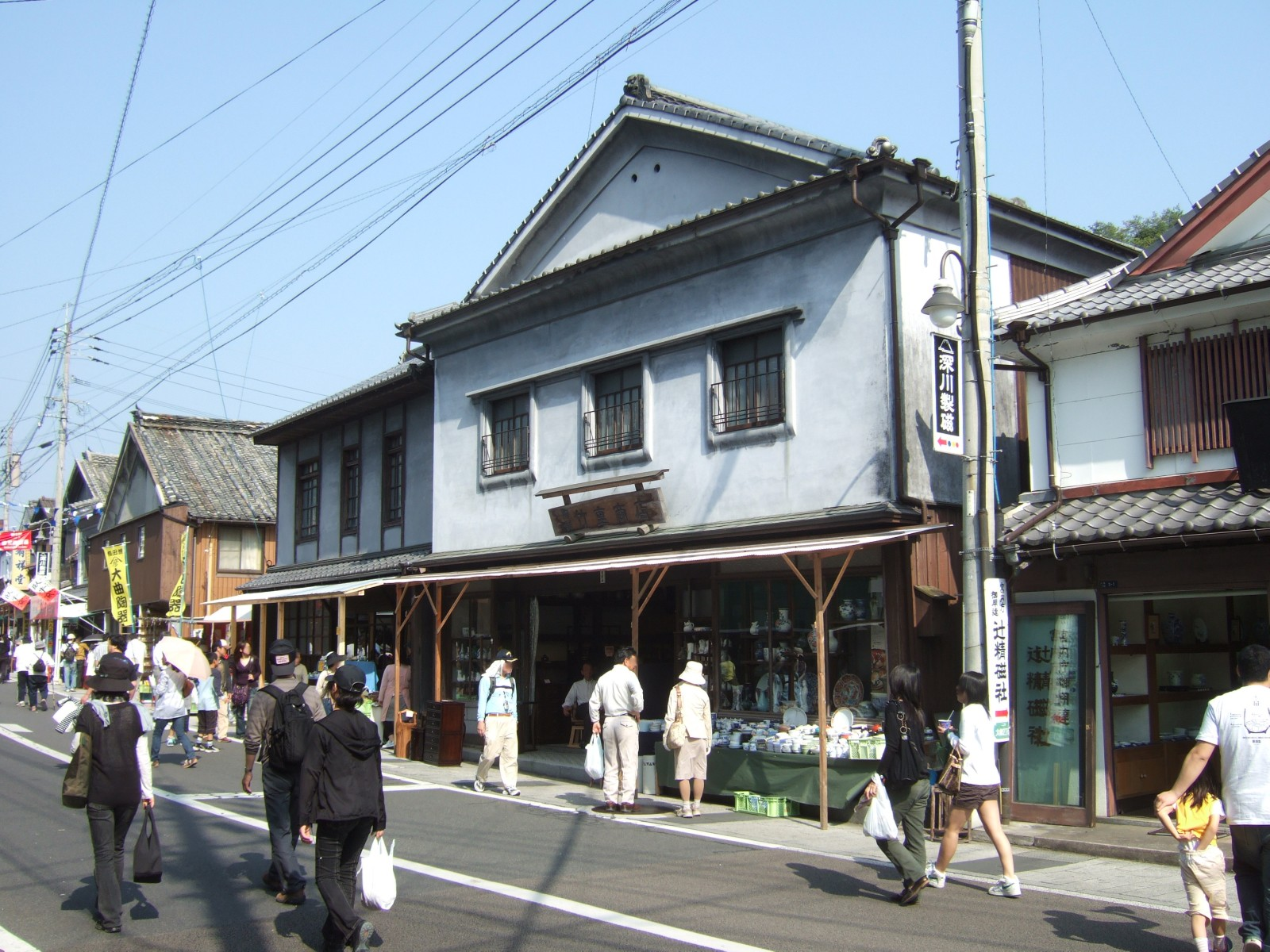
The Arita Ceramic Fair

Arita (有田町, Arita-chō) is a town located in Nishimatsuura District, Saga Prefecture, Japan. As of 31 May 2024, the town had an estimated population of 18,634 in 7867 households, and a population density of 280 people per km^{2}. The total area of the town is 51.92 km^{2} (20.05 sq mi). It is known for producing Arita porcelain, one of the traditional handicrafts of Japan. It also holds the largest ceramic fair in Western Japan, the Arita Ceramic Fair. This event is held from April 29 to May 5 (Golden Week) every year and has thousands of stores and stalls lining the six-kilometre long main street.

== Geography ==
Arita is located in the western part of Saga Prefecture, bordering Nagasaki Prefecture from its southwest to western sides. About 70% of the town is forest and mountains.

=== Neighbouring municipalities ===
Nagasaki Prefecture

- Hasami
- Sasebo

Saga Prefecture

- Imari
- Takeo

=== Climate ===
Arita has a humid subtropical climate (Köppen Cfa) characterized by warm summers and cool winters with light to no snowfall. The average annual temperature in Arita is 15.9 °C. The average annual rainfall is 1801 mm with September as the wettest month. The temperatures are highest on average in August, at around 26.6 °C, and lowest in January, at around 5.7 °C.

=== Demographics ===
Per Japanese census data, the population of Arita is as shown below.

Historical population
Year	Pop.	±%
1940	19,003	—
1950	24,419	+28.5%
1960	24,579	+0.7%
1970	23,231	−5.5%
1980	23,495	+1.1%
1990	23,413	−0.3%
2000	22,314	−4.7%
2010	20,929	−6.2%
2020	19,010	−9.2%

== History ==
The area of Arita was part of ancient Hizen Province. During the Edo Period, it was mostly part of the holdings of Saga Domain. Arita was one of the first sites in Japan to produce porcelain, Arita ware. The discovery of porcelain stone is attributed to a Korean potter named Kanagae Sambe (Yi Sam-pyeong) who discovered a source of kaolin underneath the Izumiyama mountain in Arita, and began firing the nation's first porcelain.

Following the Meiji restoration, the village of Sarayama is renamed and reclassified as the town of Arita. Also, the villages of Shin, Magarikawa and Ōyama were established within Nishimatsuura District, with the creation of the modern municipalities system on April 1, 1889. On November 13, 1896, the village of Shin was renamed Arita, which was raised to town status on January 1, 1947, and renamed Higashi-Arita and which merged with Arita on April 1, 1954. Magarikawa and Ōyama merge to form the village of Nishi-Arita on April 1, 1955. Nishi-Arita was raised to town status on April 1, 1965, and was merged into Arita on March 1, 2006.

== Government ==
Arita has a mayor-council form of government with a directly elected mayor and a unicameral town council of 165 members. Arita contributes one member to the Saga Prefectural Assembly. In terms of national politics, the town is part of the Saga 2nd district of the lower house of the Diet of Japan.

== Economy ==
The economy of Arita is overwhelmingly based on the ceramics industry, notably production of Arita ware, and on tourism.

== Education ==
Arita has four public elementary schools and two public junior high schools by the town government, and one public high school operated by the Fukuoka Prefectural Board of Education. The prefecture also operates a special education school for the handicapped.

=== Prefectural high schools ===
- Arita Technical High School

=== Municipal junior high schools ===
- Arita Junior High School
- Nishi-Arita Junior High School

=== Municipal elementary schools ===
- Arita Chūbu Elementary School
- Arita Elementary School
- Magarikawa Elementary School
- Ōyama Elementary School

=== Other schools ===
- Arita College of Ceramics

== Transportation ==
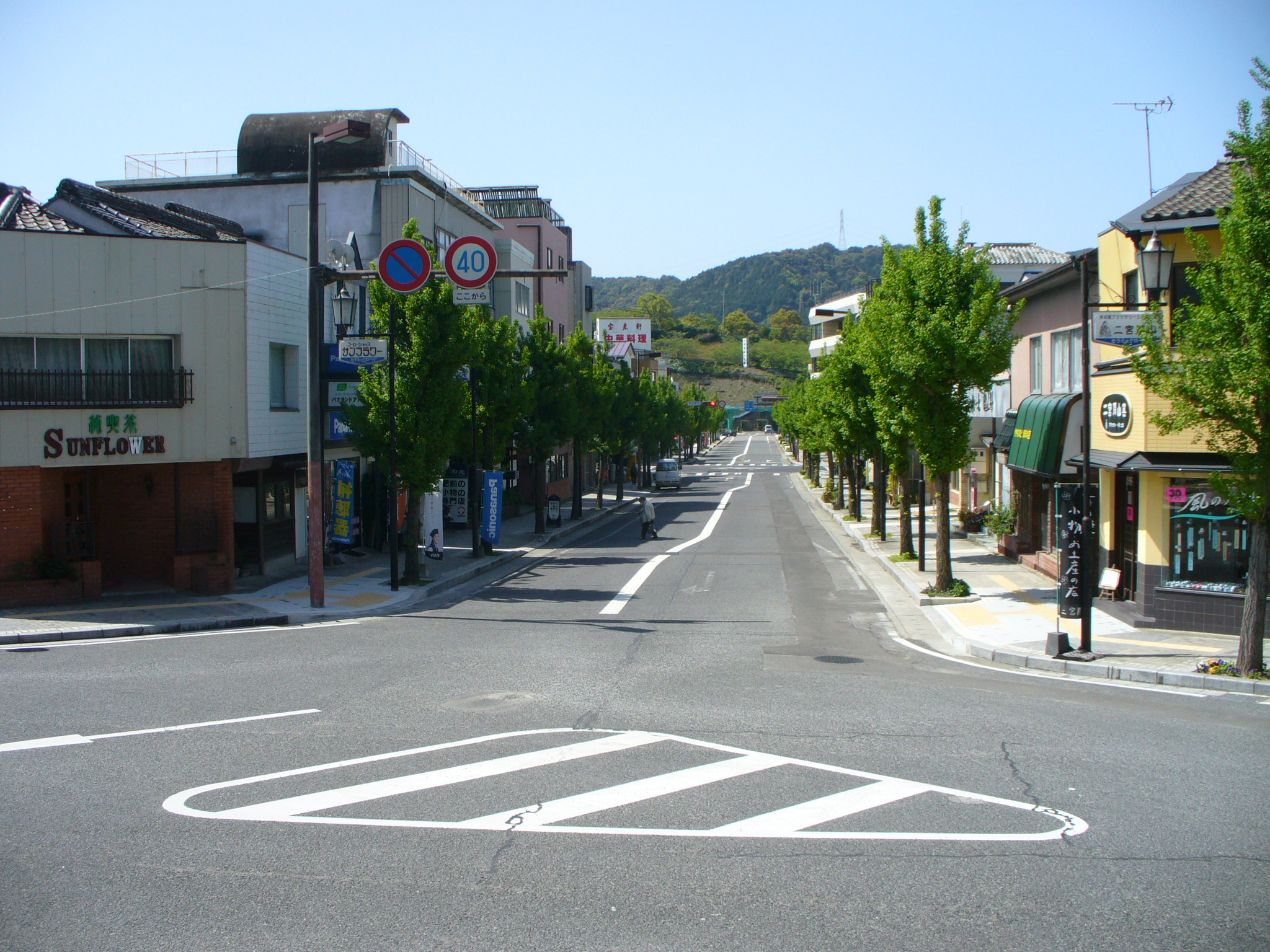
View of the Japanese town of Arita from the railway station

=== Railways ===
- JR Kyushu - Sasebo Line
  - ■ Kami-Arita - Arita
- Matsuura Railway- Nishi-Kyūshū Line
  - Arita - Midaibashi - Kurogō - Zōshuku - Nishi-Arita - Ōgi - Yamadani - Meotoishi

=== Highways ===
- National Route 35
- National Route 202
- National Route 498

== Sister cities ==
Arita is twinned with:

- Meissen, Germany

=== Friendship city ===
- Jingdezhen, China

== Local attractions ==
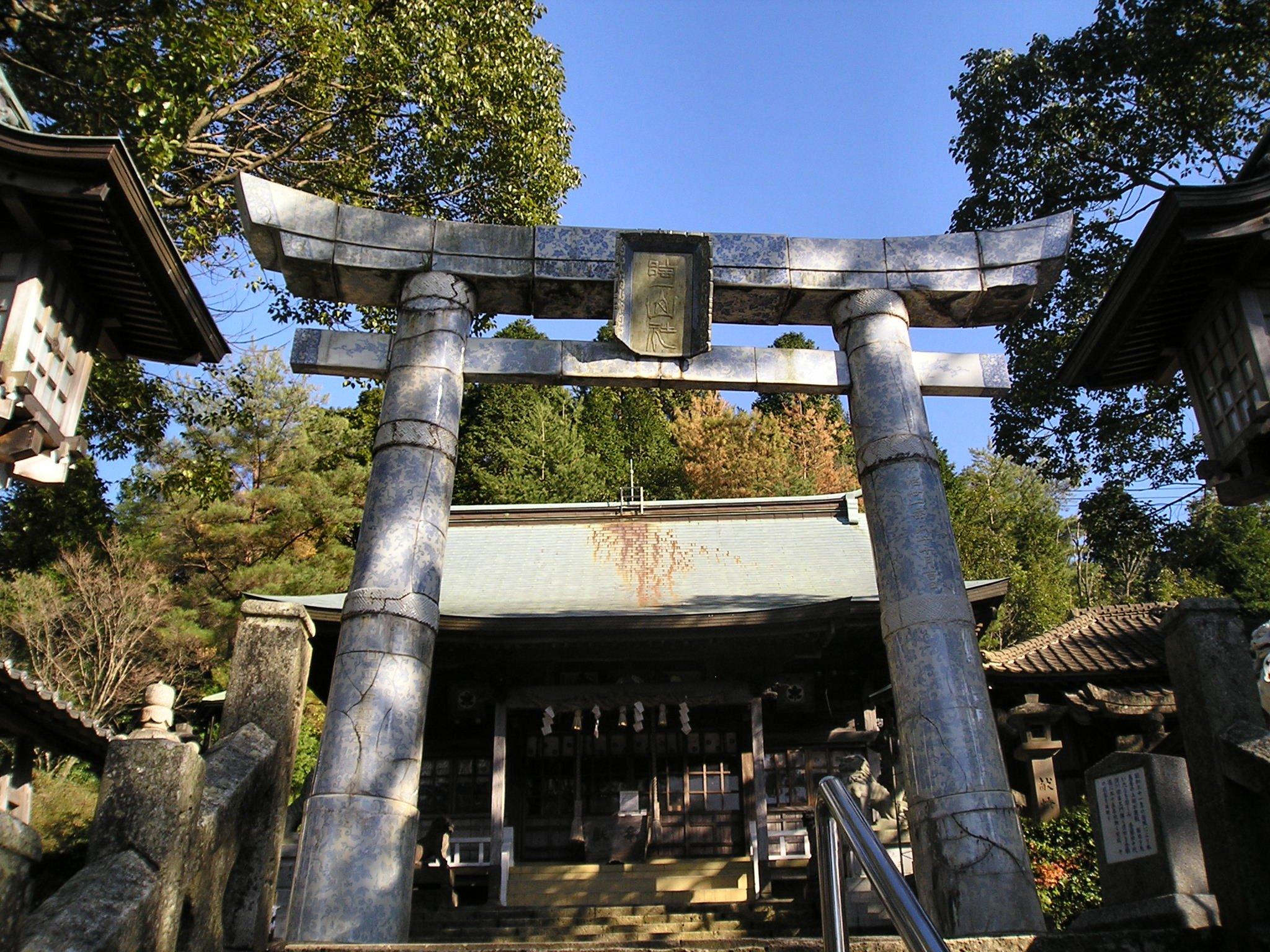
Torii at Tozan Shrine

- Arita Kan (有田館) has an exhibition of modern art porcelain, 400 different cups for coffee or tea and a theatre with computerized puppets made of porcelain.
- "China On The Park" dates back to the end of the last century when the Fukugawa factory was chosen to provide the Imperial household with porcelain. This large and modern style facility contains a factory, galleries, shops and a restaurant.
- The Kyushu Ceramic Museum houses large exhibits of old and modern style ceramics.
- The Porcelain Park is a ceramic centered theme park, and is modeled on the Zwinger Palace in Germany. Ceramic ware from the heyday of Arita are on display in the gallery.
- Rokuroza (ろくろ座), located near Kami-Arita Station, is a place where one can learn how to make pottery.
- Tozan Shrine has a porcelain archway and other items of porcelain which, at other shrines, are usually made of stone. This shrine was and still is particularly revered by Arita's ceramists.

=== Pottery ===
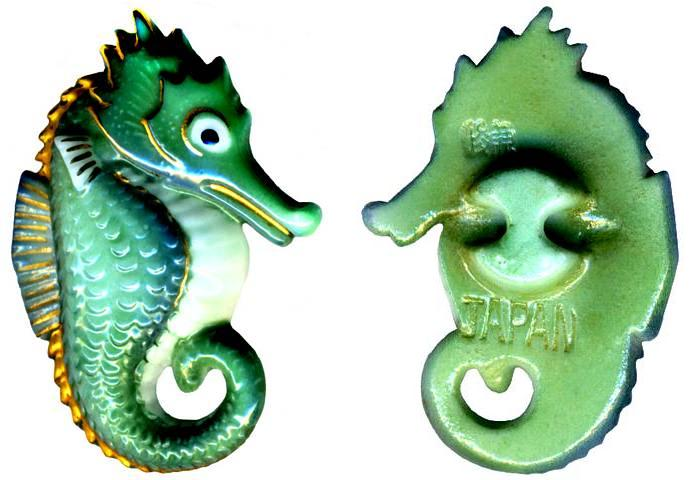
Modern Arita ware seahorse button

- Imari porcelain
- Kakiemon

== Notable people from Arita ==
- Ryuzan Aoki
- Tsuji Hitachi
- Imaizumi Imaemon XIII, a Living National Treasure in Japan
- Manji Inoue, a Living National Treasure in Japan
- Sakaida Kakiemon XIV, a Living National Treasure in Japan
- Kakiemon Sakaeda, The 1st Kakiemon

== See also ==
- Hakuji
- Japanese pottery
- Karatsu ware – Produced in Saga. The most produced pottery in western Japan. Believed to have started in the 16th century. Greatly influenced by Korean potters.
- Yi Sam Pyong (Yi Sam-p'young; 1579–1655)
