= Nishi-Kyūshū Line =

Railway line in Saga & Nagasaki Prefectures, Japan

Nishi-Kyushu Line
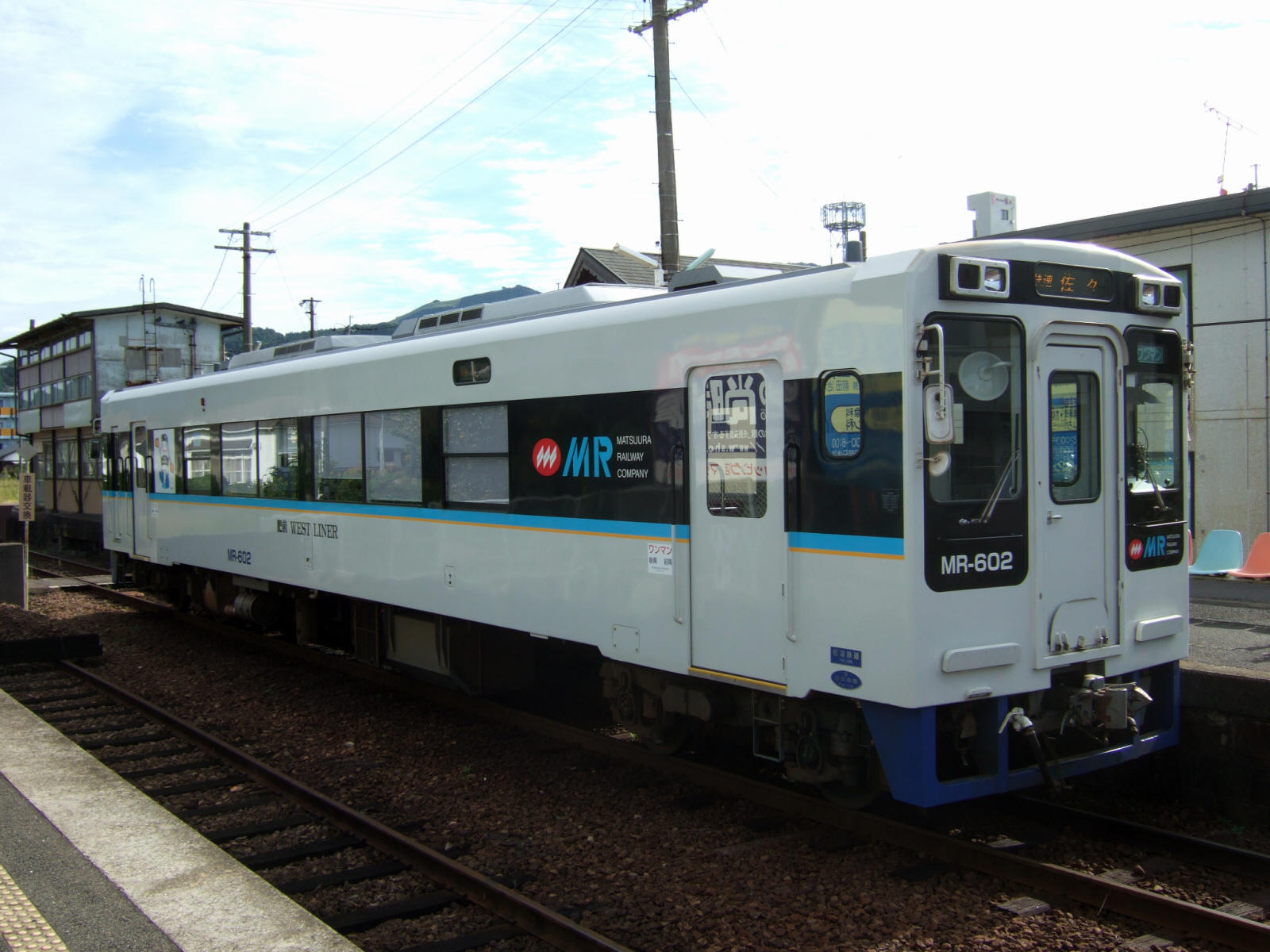
- MR-600 series diesel railcar

Overview
- Status: In operation
- Owner: Matsuura Railway
- Locale: Kyushu (Saga and Nagasaki Prefectures)
- Termini: Arita; Sasebo
- Stations: 57

Service
- Type: Regional rail
- Operator(s): Matsuura Railway
- Rolling stock: MR-400 series DMU, MR-500 series DMU, MR-600 series DMU

History
- Opened: 1 March 1945 (fully)

Technical
- Line length: 93.9 km (58.3 mi)
- Number of tracks: Entire line single tracked
- Character: Urban and rural
- Track gauge: 1,067 mm (3 ft 6 in)
- Electrification: None
- Operating speed: 85 km/h (53 mph)
Route map

The Nishi-Kyushu Line (西九州線, Nishi-Kyūshū-sen) is a Japanese railway line operated by the private railway operator Matsuura Railway, which connects Arita in Saga Prefecture with Sasebo in Nagasaki Prefecture. This is the westernmost railway line in Japan, with Tabira-Hiradoguchi Station being the westernmost station.

== History ==
The Kansai Coal Mining Co. opened a 12 km (7.5 mi), 2 ft 6 in (762 mm) gauge line from Saza to Sechibaru via Yoshii in 1896.

The 1,067 mm (3 ft 6 in) Arita - Imari section of the line was opened on 7 August 1898 by the Imari Railway (伊万里鉄道, Imari Tetsudō), which merged with the Kyushu Railway in December of the same year. In 1907, the line was nationalised, becoming the Imari Line (伊万里線, Imari-sen). The line was extended to Imabuku in 1930, Matsuura in 1933, Tabira-Hiradoguchi in 1935, and Senryūgataki in 1939.

The then isolated Hidariishi - Ainoura section was opened as a 2 ft 6 in (762 mm) gauge line by the Sasebo Light Railway (佐世保軽便鉄道, Sasebo Keibin Tetsudō) for coal transportation on 27 March 1920, and extended to Kami-Sasebo the following year. In 1931, it was extended to Saza, with the company acquiring the Kansai Coal line to Sechibaru in 1933 and passenger services to Yoshii commencing in 1934. A connection to Sasebo opened in 1935, and the company was nationalised in October 1936. Between 1943 and 1944, the line was regauged to 1,067 mm (3 ft 6 in), with a new alignment opened in March 1945, linking the two sections.

From 1 April 1988, the line between Arita and Sasebo was transferred from JNR operation to the privately owned Matsuura Railway.

=== Former connecting lines ===
- Yoshii Station: The 7 km (4.3 mi) Sechibaru line to Sechibaru, opened by the Kansai Coal Mining Co. as a 2 ft 6 in (762 mm) gauge line in 1896, was nationalised and regauged at the same time as the main line, and closed in 1971.
- Saza Station: The 4 km (2.5 mi) line to Usunoura was opened by the Sasebo Light Railway for coal transportation in 1931. It was also nationalised and regauged at the same time as the main line, and closed in 1971.
- Hidariishi Station: The 4 km (2.5 mi) Yunoki line to 'Upper' Sasebo opened in 1921 as a 2 ft 6 in (762 mm) gauge line, became a branch with the opening of the direct line to Sasebo in 1935, was regauged in 1943 and remained in service until flood damage closed it in 1967.
- Sasebo station - A 5 km (3.1 mi) line to a US Forces Japan oil storage facility operated between 1950 and 1978.

== Stations ==
●: Stops |: Does not stop

Rapid Service: Down trains (to Sasebo) operate between Saza and Sasebo. Up trains (from Sasebo) operate between Sasebo and Tabira-Hiradoguchi.

Station	Japanese	Distance (km)	Rapid service	Transfers	Location	
Arita	有田	0.0		■ Sasebo Line	Arita	Saga
Midaibashi	三代橋	1.7			Arita	Saga
Kurogō	黒川	2.8			Arita	Saga
Zōshuku	蔵宿	3.8			Arita	Saga
Nishi-Arita	西有田	4.8			Arita	Saga
Ōgi	大木	6.1			Arita	Saga
Yamadani	山谷	7.0			Arita	Saga
Meotoishi	夫婦石	7.9			Arita	Saga
Kanatake	金武	9.8			Imari	Saga
Kawahigashi	川東	11.6			Imari	Saga
Imari	伊万里	13.0		■ Chikuhi Line	Imari	Saga
Higashi-Yamashiro	東山代	16.3			Imari	Saga
Sato	里	17.5			Imari	Saga
Kusuku	楠久	18.6			Imari	Saga
Naruishi	鳴石	20.0			Imari	Saga
Kubara	久原	21.7			Imari	Saga
Haze	波瀬	22.8			Imari	Saga
Uranosaki	浦ノ崎	24.8			Imari	Saga
Fukushimaguchi	福島口	25.3			Imari	Saga
Imabuku	今福	27.5			Matsuura	Nagasaki
Takashimaguchi	鷹島口	28.7			Matsuura	Nagasaki
Maehama	前浜	32.4			Matsuura	Nagasaki
Tsukinokawa	調川	33.5			Matsuura	Nagasaki
Matsuura	松浦	35.6			Matsuura	Nagasaki
Matsuura Hatsudensho-mae	松浦発電所前	38.2			Matsuura	Nagasaki
Mikuriya	御厨	41.6			Matsuura	Nagasaki
Nishikoba	西木場	44.4			Matsuura	Nagasaki
Higashi-Tabira	東田平	46.3			Hirado	Nagasaki
Naka-Tabira	中田平	48.1			Hirado	Nagasaki
Tabira-Hiradoguchi	たびら平戸口	51.2	●		Hirado	Nagasaki
Nishi-Tabira	西田平	53.8	|		Hirado	Nagasaki
Suetachibana	すえたちばな	58.1	|		Sasebo	Nagasaki
Emukae-Shikamachi	江迎鹿町	60.0	●		Sasebo	Nagasaki
Takaiwa	高岩	61.4	|		Sasebo	Nagasaki
Inotsuki	いのつき	64.9	|		Sasebo	Nagasaki
Senryūgataki	潜竜ヶ滝	66.5	|		Sasebo	Nagasaki
Yoshii	吉井	68.8	●		Sasebo	Nagasaki
Kōda	神田	70.3	|		Saza	Nagasaki
Seihō-Koukou-Mae	清峰高校前	72.4	|		Saza	Nagasaki
Saza	佐々	74.0	●		Saza	Nagasaki
Koura	小浦	75.8	●		Saza	Nagasaki
Masaru	真申	77.7	|		Sasebo	Nagasaki
Tanagata	棚方	78.3	●		Sasebo	Nagasaki
Ainoura	相浦	79.7	●		Sasebo	Nagasaki
Daigaku	大学	80.9	●		Sasebo	Nagasaki
Kami-Ainoura	上相浦	81.7	●		Sasebo	Nagasaki
Motoyama	本山	83.5	●		Sasebo	Nagasaki
Nakazato	中里	84.0	|		Sasebo	Nagasaki
Kaize	皆瀬	85.5	|		Sasebo	Nagasaki
Nonaka	野中	86.2	|		Sasebo	Nagasaki
Hidariishi	左石	87.4	●		Sasebo	Nagasaki
Senpukuji	泉福寺	88.4	●		Sasebo	Nagasaki
Yamanota	山の田	89.5	|		Sasebo	Nagasaki
Kita-Sasebo	北佐世保	90.6	●		Sasebo	Nagasaki
Naka-Sasebo	中佐世保	92.6	|		Sasebo	Nagasaki
Sasebo-Chūō	佐世保中央	92.8	●		Sasebo	Nagasaki
Sasebo	佐世保	93.8	●	■ Sasebo Line	Sasebo	Nagasaki

== See also ==
- List of railway lines in Japan
