= Nishiarita, Saga =

Dissolved municipality in Saga prefecture, Japan

Nishiarita (西有田町, Nishiarita-chō) was a town located in Nishimatsuura District, Saga Prefecture, Japan. The status of this municipality was changed from a village to a town on April 1, 1965.

As of 2003, the town had an estimated population of 9,374 and a density of 242.16 persons per km^{2}. The total area was 38.71 km^{2}.

On March 1, 2006, Nishiarita was merged into the expanded town of Arita.
