= Arita Porcelain Park =

Small theme park in Arita town, Saga Prefecture, Japan

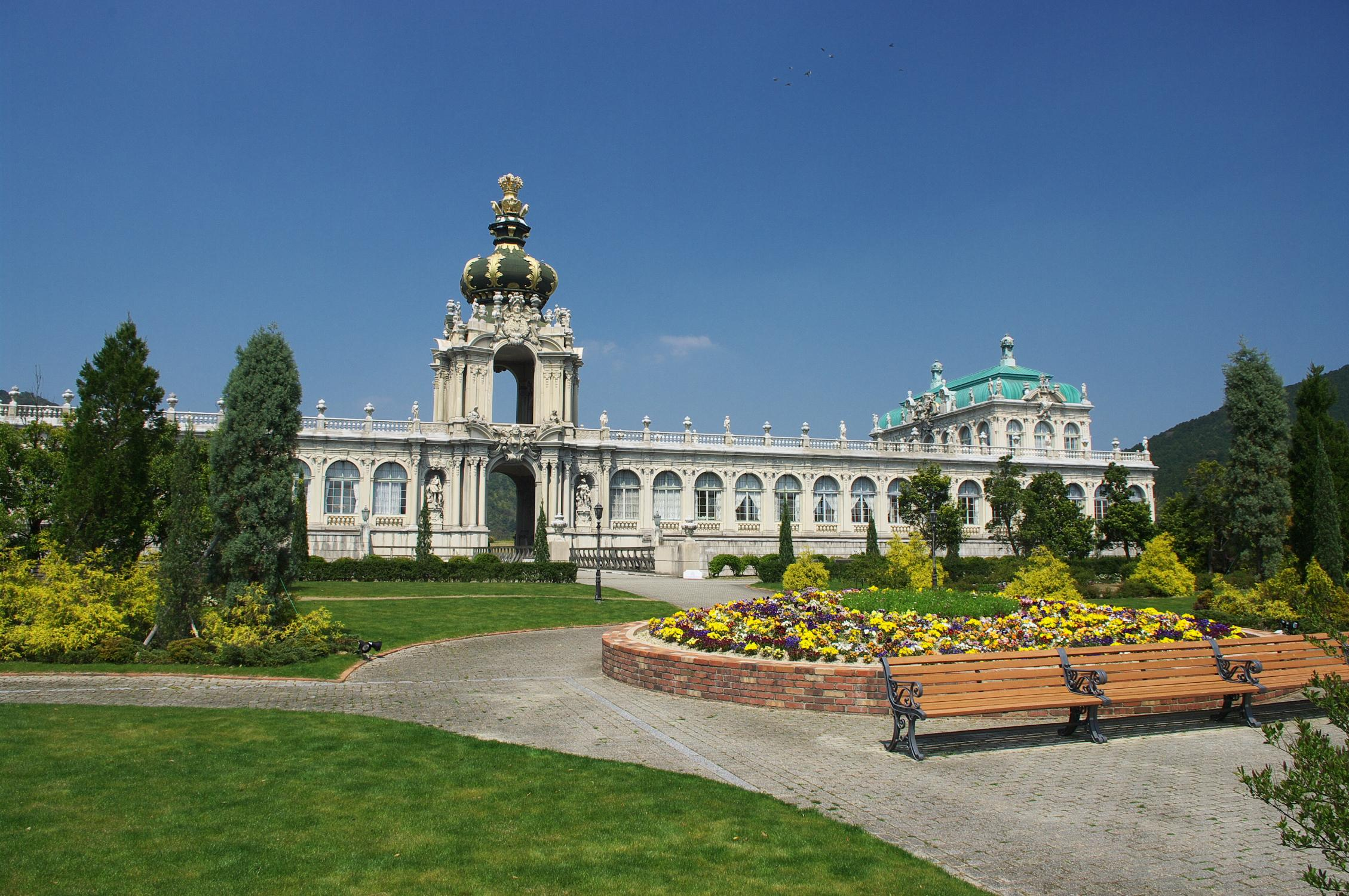
- Replica of Zwinger Palace at the theme park "Arita Porcelain Park"
- Interactive map of Arita Porcelain Park
- Location: Arita town, Saga Prefecture, Japan
- Coordinates: 33.165792°N 129.908266°E
- Website: www.arita-touki.com

The Arita Porcelain Park is a theme park located in Arita town, Saga Prefecture, Japan.

== Description ==
The Porcelain Park is a recreation of a traditional German village, and is located just on the outskirts of Arita on the road to Hasami. Most stunning is the reproduction of the “Zwinger,” a famous palace in the German city of Dresden. Inside the palace are impressive permanent exhibition of both European porcelain in one wing and Arita-yaki in the other. Behind the palace lies a European-style garden. There is also a large ancient kiln which can be visited. The theme park also houses various stores selling both traditional Japanese and European-style products.
