= Saihi Bus =

Bus company in Nagasaki & Saga Prefectures, Japan

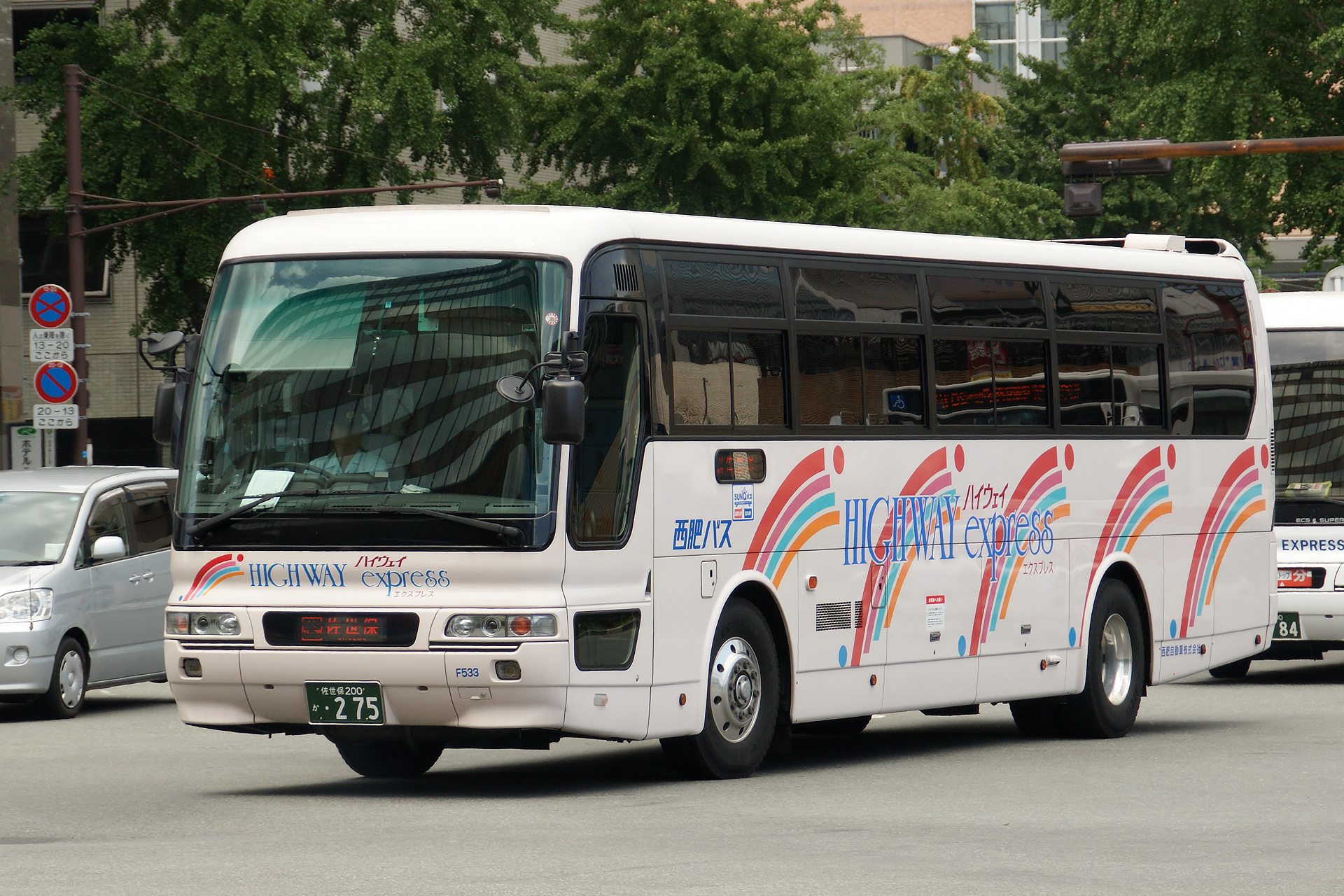
Saihi Bus highway bus

Saihi Bus (西肥バス, Saihi Basu), also known as Saihi Motor (西肥自動車, Saihi Jidousha), is a bus company in northern Nagasaki Prefecture and western Saga Prefecture. Its headquarters are in Sasebo City.

It runs express bus lines to Fukuoka and Nagasaki from Sasebo and Huis Ten Bosch Station.

== History ==
- 1920-02-10 - Saihi Motor was established by Kyotaro Nakamura and some enterprisers in Kitamatsuura Area.
