= Nishimatsuura District =

District in Saga prefecture, Japan

Coordinates: 33.2054°N 129.859°E

Nishimatsuura District in Saga Prefecture

Nishimatsuura (西松浦郡, Nishimatsuura-gun) is a district located in Saga Prefecture, Japan.

As of April 1, 2021, the district has an estimated population of 18,804 and a density of 286 persons per square kilometre. The total area is 65.9 square kilometres (25.4 square miles).

== Towns and villages ==
- Arita, whose borders are effectively the same as Nishimatsuura District's.

=== History ===
Before 1889	April 1, 1889	1889 - 1944	1945 - 1959		1960 - 1989	1989–Present	Present
	Imari	December 8, 1943; Imari	April 1, 1954; City status gained Imari		Imari	Imari	Imari
	Ōtsubo	December 8, 1943; Imari	April 1, 1954; City status gained Imari		Imari	Imari	Imari
	Ōkawachi	December 8, 1943; Imari	April 1, 1954; City status gained Imari		Imari	Imari	Imari
	Makishima	December 10, 1928; Incorporated into Imari	April 1, 1954; City status gained Imari		Imari	Imari	Imari
	Kurogawa	Kurogawa	April 1, 1954; City status gained Imari		Imari	Imari	Imari
	Ōdake	February 16, 1901; Renamed; Hatatsu	April 1, 1954; City status gained Imari		Imari	Imari	Imari
	Minamihata	Minamihata	April 1, 1954; City status gained Imari		Imari	Imari	Imari
	Ōkawa	Ōkawa	April 1, 1954; City status gained Imari		Imari	Imari	Imari
	Matsuura	Matsuura	April 1, 1954; City status gained Imari		Imari	Imari	Imari
	Niri	Niri	April 1, 1954; City status gained Imari		Imari	Imari	Imari
	Higashiyamashiro	Higashiyamashiro	April 1, 1954; City status gained Imari		Imari	Imari	Imari
	Nishiyamashiro	April 1, 1936; Town status gained, renamed Yamashiro	April 1, 1954; City status gained Imari		Imari	Imari	Imari
	Arita	Arita	Arita	April 1, 1954; Arita	Arita	March 1, 2006; Arita	Arita
	Shin	November 13, 1895; Renamed; Arita (village)	January 1, 1947; Town status gained, renamed Higashiarita	April 1, 1954; Arita	Arita	March 1, 2006; Arita	Arita
	Magarikawa	Magarikawa	April 1, 1955; Nishiarita		April 1, 1965; Town status gained Nishiarita	March 1, 2006; Arita	Arita
	Ōyama	Ōyama	April 1, 1955; Nishiarita		April 1, 1965; Town status gained Nishiarita	March 1, 2006; Arita	Arita
