= Arita Station =

Railway station in Arita, Saga Prefecture, Japan

Arita Station 有田駅
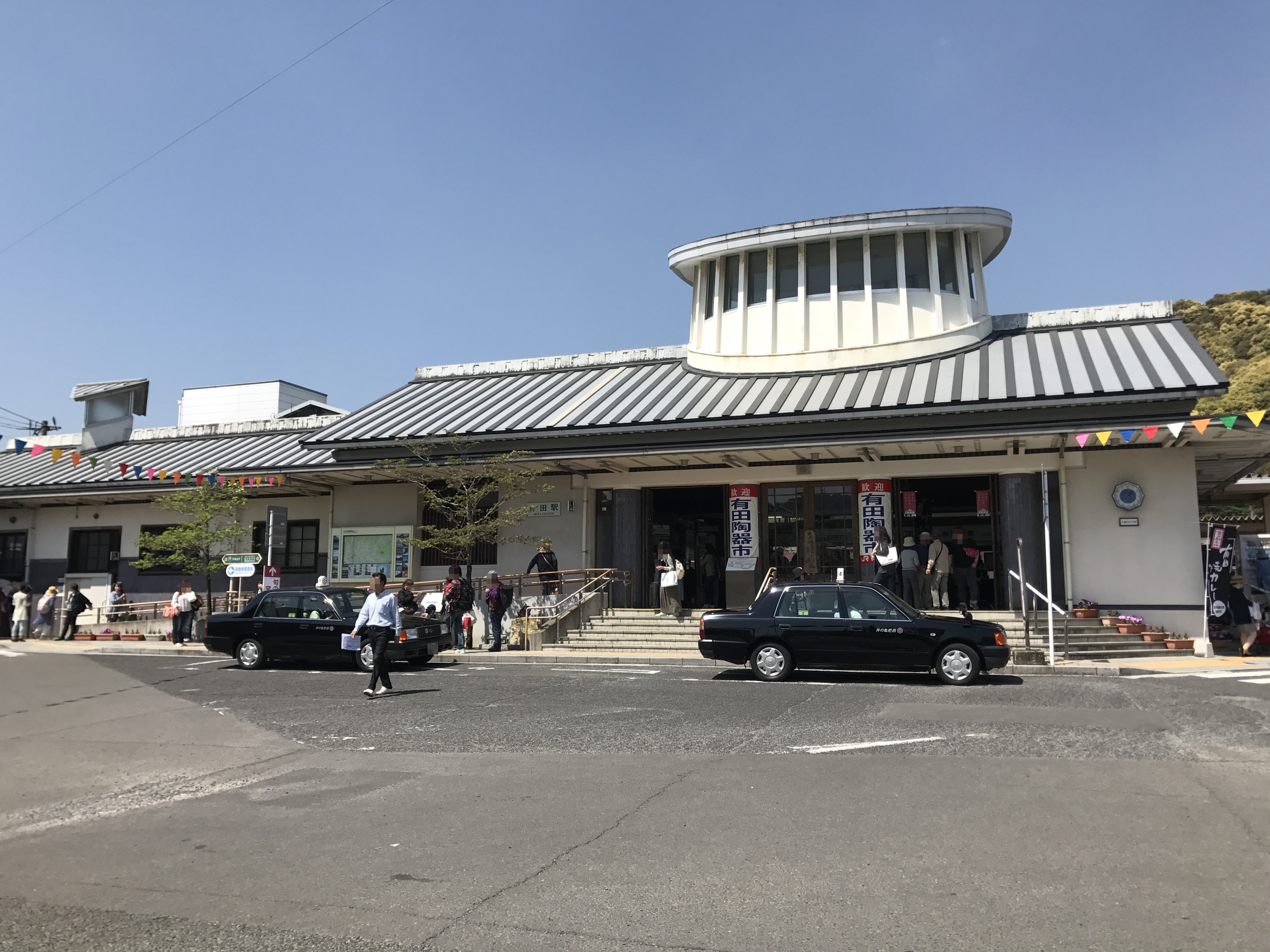
- Arita Station in 2017

General information
- Location: Honmachi; Arita, Saga; Japan
- Coordinates: 33°11′02″N 129°52′54″E
- Operator: JR Kyushu; Matsuura Railway
- Distance: Sasebo Line: 28.2 km (17.5 mi) from Hizen-Yamaguchi
- Platforms: 1 side + 1 island platforms
- Tracks: 3 + 1 through-track and multiple sidings

Construction
- Structure type: At-grade
- Parking: Available, rentals available
- Accessible: No, platforms linked by footbridge

Other information
- Status: Outsourced JR ticket window (Midori no Madoguchi); Matsuura Railway ticket window
- Website: JR Arita; Matsuura Railway

History
- Opened: 10 July 1897

Passengers
- 888 daily (JR Kyushu FY2016); 390 daily (Matsuura FY2015)
- Rank: 178th (among JR Kyushu stations)

Services
Preceding station	JR Kyushu	Following station
Mikawachi towards Sasebo	Sasebo Line	Kami-Arita towards Kōhoku
Haiki towards Sasebo or Huis Ten Bosch	Midori and Huis Ten Bosch	Takeo-Onsen towards Hakata
Preceding station	Matsuura Railway	Following station
Midaibashi towards Sasebo	Nishi-Kyūshū Line	Terminus
Location
- Location within Saga Prefecture Location within Japan

Arita Station (有田駅, Arita-eki) is a junction passenger railway station located in the town of Arita, Saga, Japan, jointly operated by Kyushu Railway Company (JR Kyushu) and the third-sector Matsuura Railway and is a transfer station between the Sasebo Line and the Nishi-Kyushu Line.

== Lines ==
Arita Station is served by the JR Kyushu Sasebo Line and is located 28.2 km from the starting point of the line at Hizen-Yamaguchi. Besides the Sasebo Line local services, the JR limited services Huis Ten Bosch from Hakata to Huis Ten Bosch and Midori from Hakata to Sasebo also stop at the station.

The station is also the terminus for the 03.8 Matsuura Railway Nishi-Kyushu Line to Sasebo.

== Layout ==
The station consists of a side platform and an island platform serving three tracks. Platforms 1 (side platform) and 2 (on the island) are used by Sasebo Line trains while platform 3 (also on the island), whose track is a dead-end siding, is used by Nishi-Kyushu Line trains. A through-track runs between the two platforms.

The station building is a modern structure with a distinctive circular skylight. It houses a waiting area, staffed ticket windows for both JR Kyushu and the Matsuura Railway, an Arita tourist information centre and a cafe. Access to the island platform from the station building is by means of a footbridge. Paid parking is available at the station forecourt and car rentals are available.

Management of the JR facilities at the station has been outsourced to the JR Kyushu Tetsudou Eigyou Co., a wholly owned subsidiary of JR Kyushu specialising in station services. It staffs the ticket counter which is equipped with a Midori no Madoguchi facility.

To the north of the station, beyond platform 3, are multiple sidings, some of which are used by the Arita Off-Rail Station (有田オフレールステーション) (Arita ORS), a JR Freight facility for the transhipment of container freight by trucks.

=== Platforms ===
1	■ Midori・Huis Ten Bosch	for Sasebo and Huis Ten Bosch
1	■ Sasebo Line	for Haiki and Sasebo
2	■ Midori・Huis Ten Bosch	for Saga and Hakata
2	■ Sasebo Line	for Hizen-Yamaguchi and Tosu
3	■ Nishi-Kyushu Line	for Imari and Sasebo

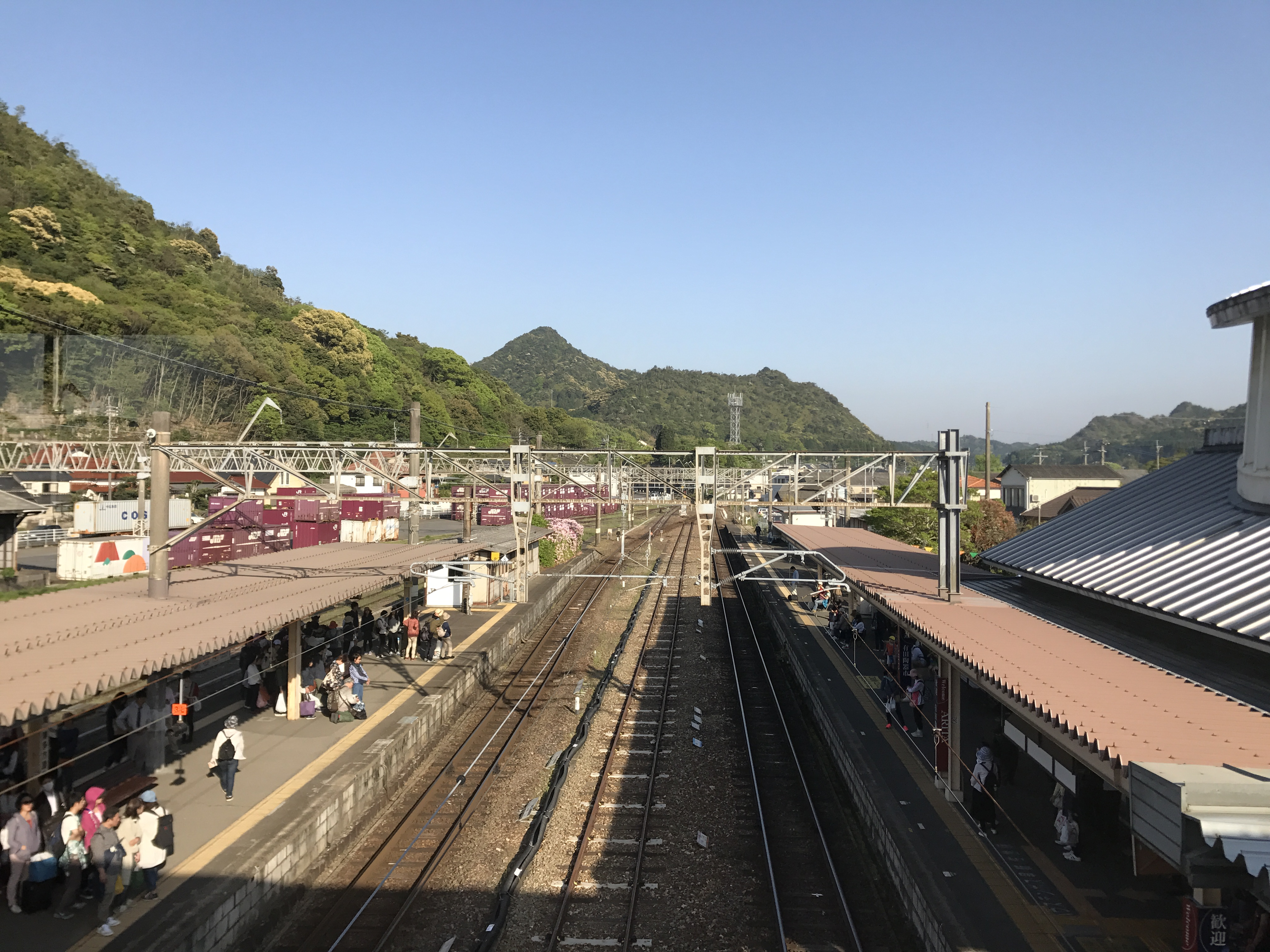
A view of the station platforms and tracks from the footbridge. Note the through-track between the platforms.

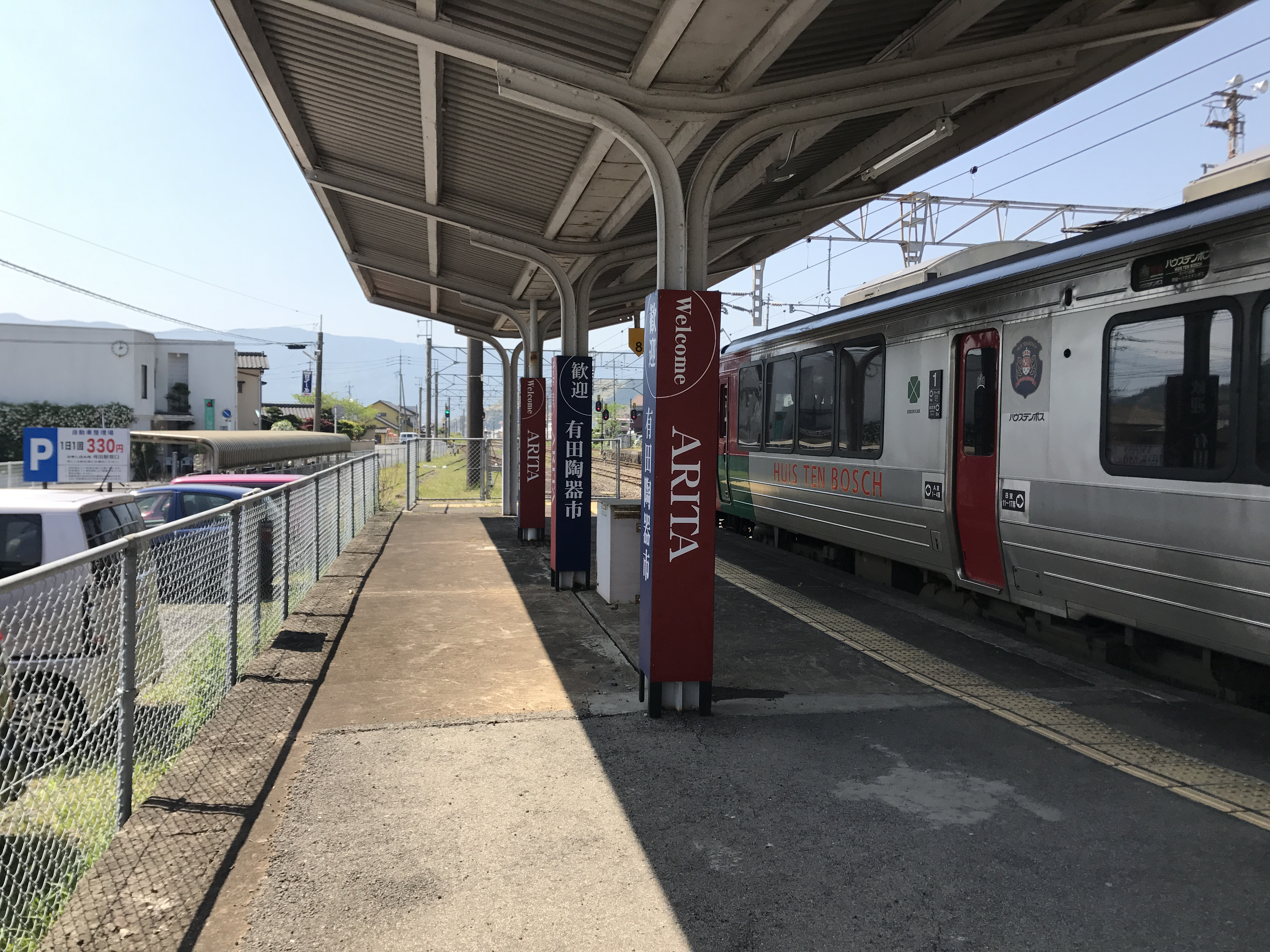
View of Platform 1 looking west, in the direction of Haiki. Note there is a siding branching off the track.

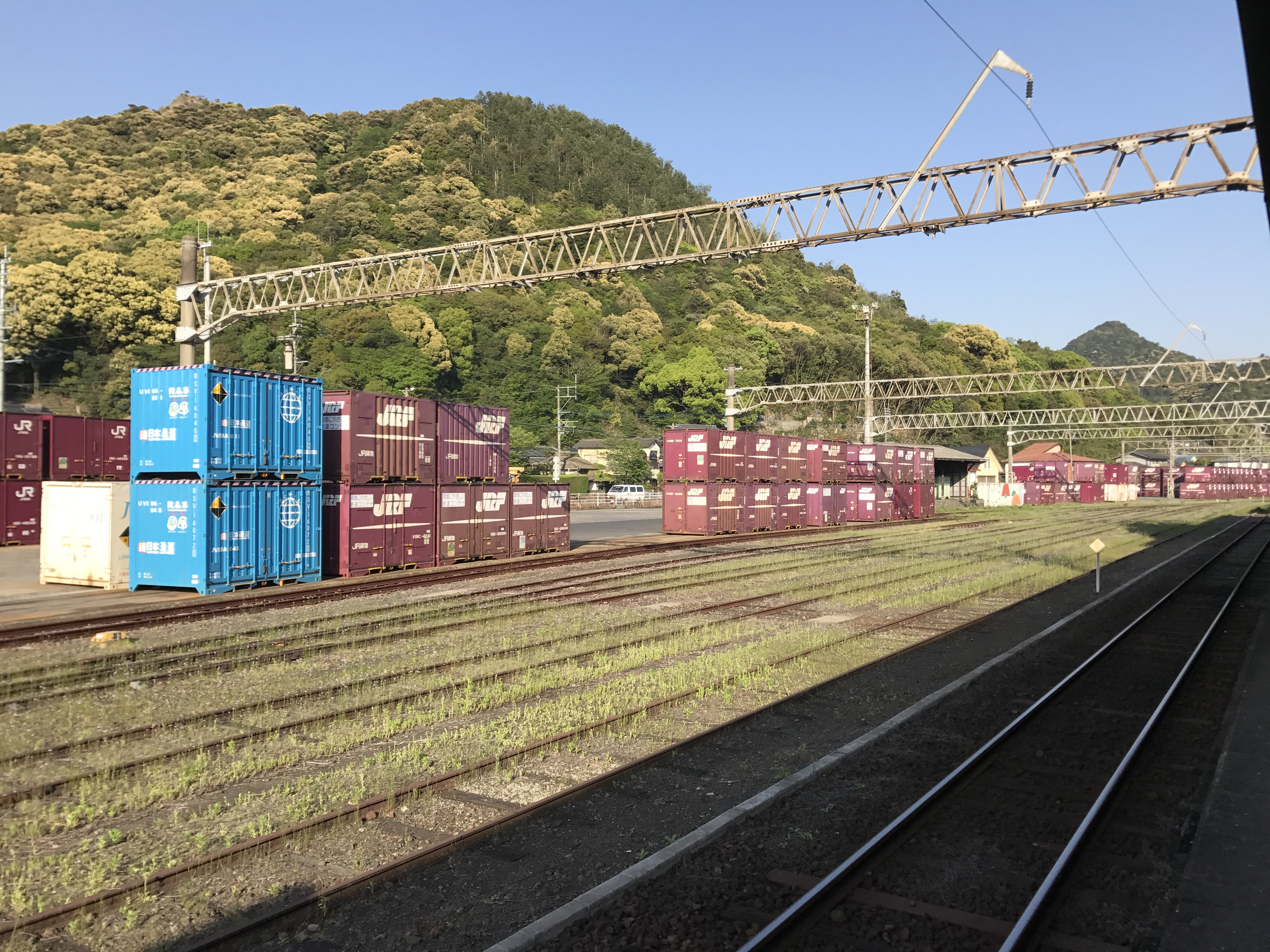
View of platform 3. Note the sidings and containers of the Arita ORS.

== History ==
The private Kyushu Railway had opened a track from Tosu to Saga and Takeo (today Takeo-Onsen) by 5 May 1895. In the next phase of expansion, the track was extended further west with Haiki opening as the new western terminus on 10 July 1897. Arita was opened on the same day as an intermediate station on the new track.

On 7 August 1898, the private Imari Railway opened a track from Imari with Arita as its southern terminus. The Imari Railway merged with the Kyushu Railway on 28 December the same year.

The Kyushu Railway was nationalized on 1 July 1907 and Japanese Government Railways (JGR) took over control of the station. On 12 October 1909, the line to Nagasaki was designated the Nagasaki Main Line while the branch to Imari was designated the Imari Line. On 1 December 1934, another route was given the designation Nagasaki Main Line and track serving the station from Hizen-Yamaguchi to Sasebo was redesignated the Sasebo Line. On 1 March 1945, the track to Imari was designated as part of the Matsuura Line. With the privatization of Japanese National Railways (JNR), the successor of JGR, on 1 April 1987, control of the station passed to JR Kyushu. On 1 April 1988, the Matsuura Line was divested to the third-sector Matsuura Railway and the line was renamed the Nishi-Kyushu Line.

== Passenger statistics ==
For the JR Kyushu station, in fiscal 2016, the station was used by an average of 888 passengers daily (boarding passengers only), and it ranked 178th among the busiest stations of JR Kyushu.

For the Matsuura Railway station, in fiscal 2015, there were a total of 142,266 boarding passengers, giving a daily average of 390 passengers.

== See also ==
- List of railway stations in Japan
