= Sasebo Station =

Railway station in Sasebo, Nagasaki Prefecture, Japan

Coordinates: 33°09′50″N 129°43′32″E

Sasebo Station 佐世保駅
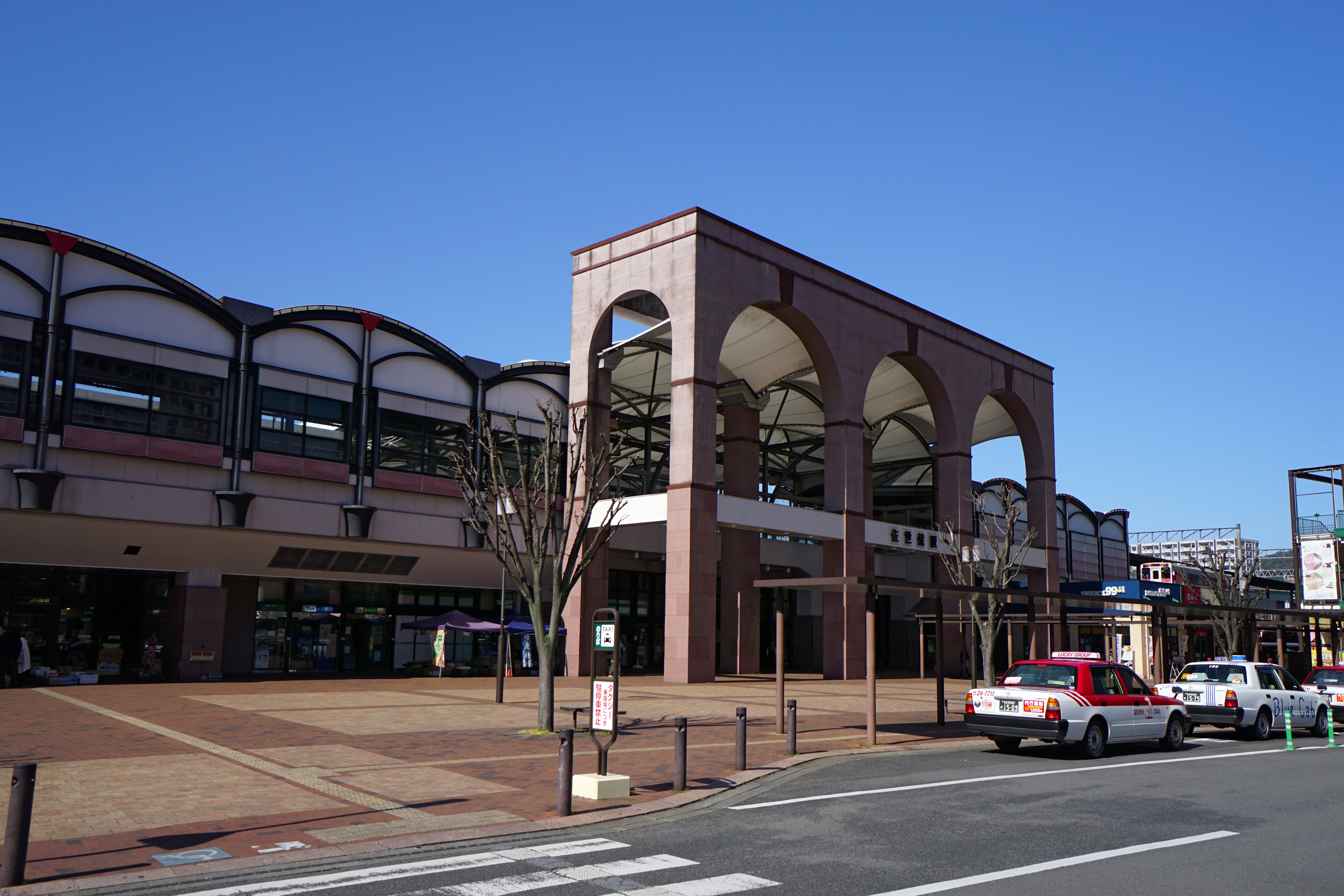
- The east entrance of Sasebo Station

General information
- Location: Miura-chō; Sasebo, Nagasaki; Japan
- Operator: JR Kyushu; Matsuura Railway
- Distance: Sasebo Line: 48.8 km (30.3 mi) from Kōhoku; Nishi-Kyūshū Line: 93.8 km (58.3 mi) from Arita
- Platforms: 3 island platforms
- Tracks: 7

History
- Opened: 20 January 1898

Services
Preceding station	JR Kyushu	Following station
Terminus	Sasebo Line	Hiu towards Kōhoku
Terminus	Midori	Haiki towards Hakata
Preceding station	Matsuura Railway	Following station
Terminus	Nishi-Kyūshū Line	Sasebo-Chūō towards Arita
Location
- Location within Japan

Sasebo Station (Japanese: 佐世保駅, Hepburn: Sasebo-eki) is the major railway station in the city of Sasebo, Nagasaki Prefecture, in Japan. The Sasebo Line of the Kyushu Railway Company and the Nishi-Kyūshū Line of the Matsuura Railway provide local and regional service and connections to the extensive JR network. Sasebo is the westernmost station in the JR Group.

The plaza in front of Sasebo Station contains a multi-level shopping complex called Friesta Sasebo, with coffee shops, clothing, housewares, music and a supermarket. Within the station itself are souvenir shops featuring local foods and products.

Sasebo Station is about two hours by train from Hakata Station in the city of Fukuoka (via the Midori line) and about two hours from Nagasaki Station in the city of Nagasaki.

Across the street from Sasebo Station is the Sasebo Bus Center, which provides connecting service to many local destinations.

== Lines ==
- JR Kyushu
  - Sasebo Line
- Matsuura Railway
  - Nishi-Kyūshū Line

== Station layout ==
The station is above ground level with three island platforms and seven tracks. One track bypasses the station. One of the platforms is not in use.

Tracks
1–2	Sasebo Line	To Haiki・Hizen-Yamaguchi・Saga・Tosu
1–2	Midori	To Saga・Hakata
1–2	Nishi-Kyūshū Line	To Saza・Tabira-Hiradoguchi・Matsuura・Imari・Arita
3–4	Sasebo Line	To Haiki・Hizen-Yamaguchi・Saga・Tosu
3–4	Midori	To Saga・Hakata
5–6	Closed

== Surroundings ==
=== East ===
- Ekimachi Ichōme Sasebo
- Hotel Resol Sasebo
- Sasebo Station Post Office
- Sasebo Bus Center
- National Route 35

=== Port ===
- Shin-Minato Terminal
- Kujirase Terminal
- Sasebo Gobangai

== History ==
- January 20, 1898 – Open for business by Kyushu Railway.
- July 1, 1907 – Railways nationalize and the station becomes part of Japanese Government Railways.
- April 1, 1987 – Railways privatize and the station is inherited by JR Kyushu.
- April 1, 1988 – JR Kyushu Matsuura Line inherited by Matsuura Railway and renamed Nishi-Kyushu Line.
- December 26, 2001 – Elevated station is completed.

== Passenger statistics ==
In fiscal 2016, the station was used by an average of 3,973 passengers daily (boarding passengers only), and it ranked 51st among the busiest stations of JR Kyushu.
