= Matsuura Railway =

Railway company in Nagasaki & Saga Prefectures, Japan

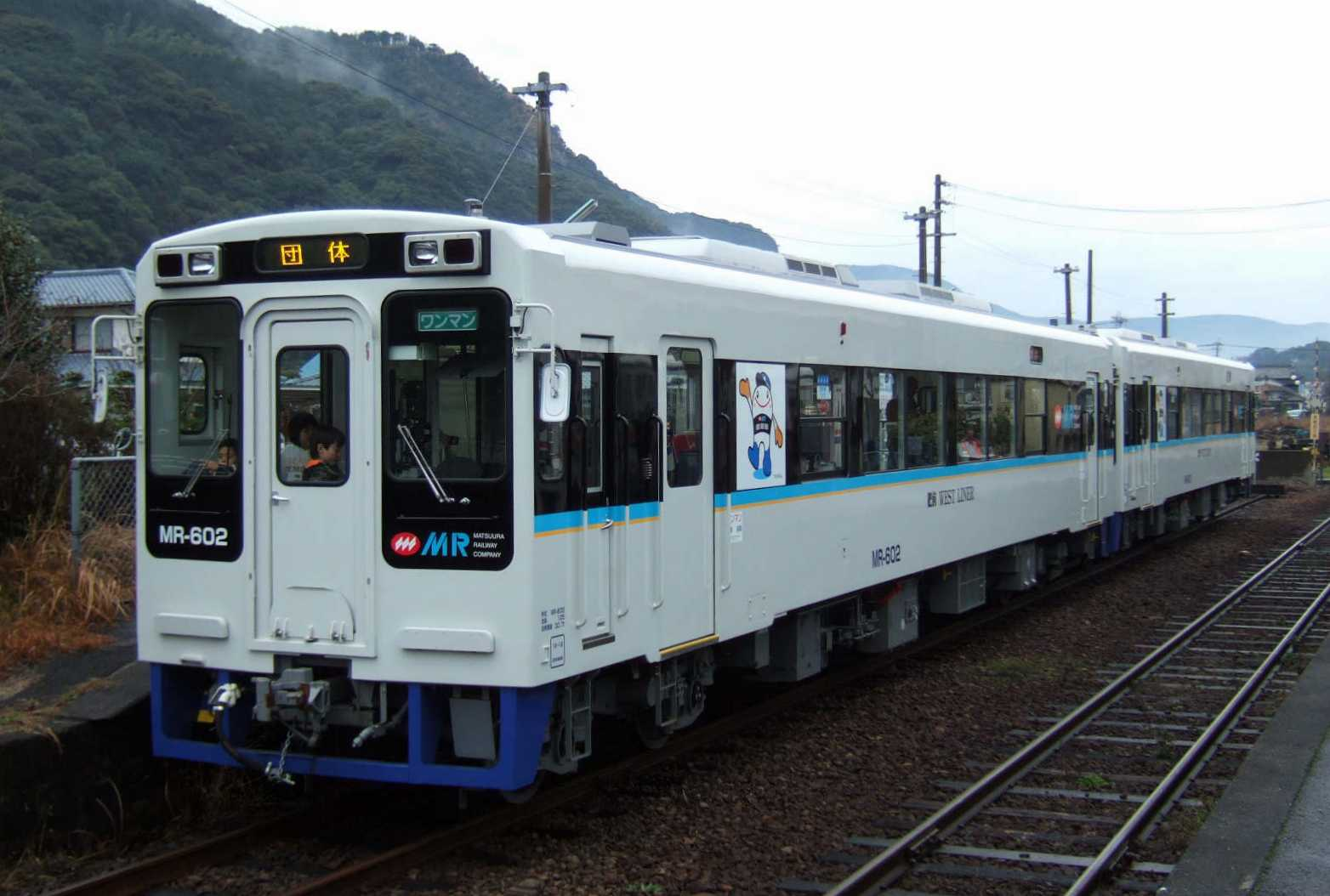
Matsuura Railway MR-600 train

Matsuura Railway (松浦鉄道, Matsuura Tetsudō) is a third-sector railway company in Nagasaki and Saga Prefecture in Japan.

== Lines ==
The railway company operates the 93.8 km Nishi-Kyūshū Line from Arita in Saga Prefecture to Sasebo in Nagasaki Prefecture. The line has 57 stations.

== Principal investors ==
- Nagasaki Prefecture (13.7%)
- Lucky Taxi (10.2%)
- Tsuji Industry (10.2%)
- Saihi Motor (10.2%)

== History ==
The company was established in December 1987, and took over operation of the former Japanese National Railways (JNR) Matsuura Line on 1 April 1988, becoming the Nishi-Kyushu Line.

== See also ==
- List of railway lines in Japan
