= History of food =

History of food covers the history and the cultural, economic, environmental, and sociological impacts of food and human nutrition. It includes malnutrition and famines. See also culinary history, which focuses on the origin and recreation of specific recipes. The historiography of studying food is called food history.

== Prehistory ==
Early human nutrition was largely determined by the availability and palatability (tastiness) of foods. Humans evolved as omnivorous hunter-gatherers, though our diet has varied significantly depending on location and climate. Historically, the diet in the tropics tended to depend more heavily on plant foods, while diet at higher latitudes was more dependent on animal products. Analyses of postcranial and cranial remains of humans and animals from the Neolithic, along with detailed bone-modification studies, have shown that cannibalism also occurred among prehistoric humans.

Agriculture developed at different times in different places, starting about 11,500 years ago, providing some cultures with a more abundant supply of grains (such as wheat, rice and maize) and potatoes; this made possible dough for staples such as bread, pasta, and tortillas. The domestication of animals provided some cultures with milk and dairy products.

In 2020, archeological research discovered a frescoed thermopolium (a fast-food counter) in an exceptional state of preservation from 79 CE/AD in Pompeii, including 2,000-year-old foods available in some of the deep terra cotta jars.

== Europe ==
=== Classical antiquity ===
During classical antiquity, diets consisted of simple fresh or preserved whole foods that were either locally grown or transported from neighboring areas during times of crisis. Physicians and philosophers studied the effect of food on the human body and they generally agreed that food was important in preventing illness and restoring health.

=== 5th to 15th centuries: Middle Ages in Western Europe ===
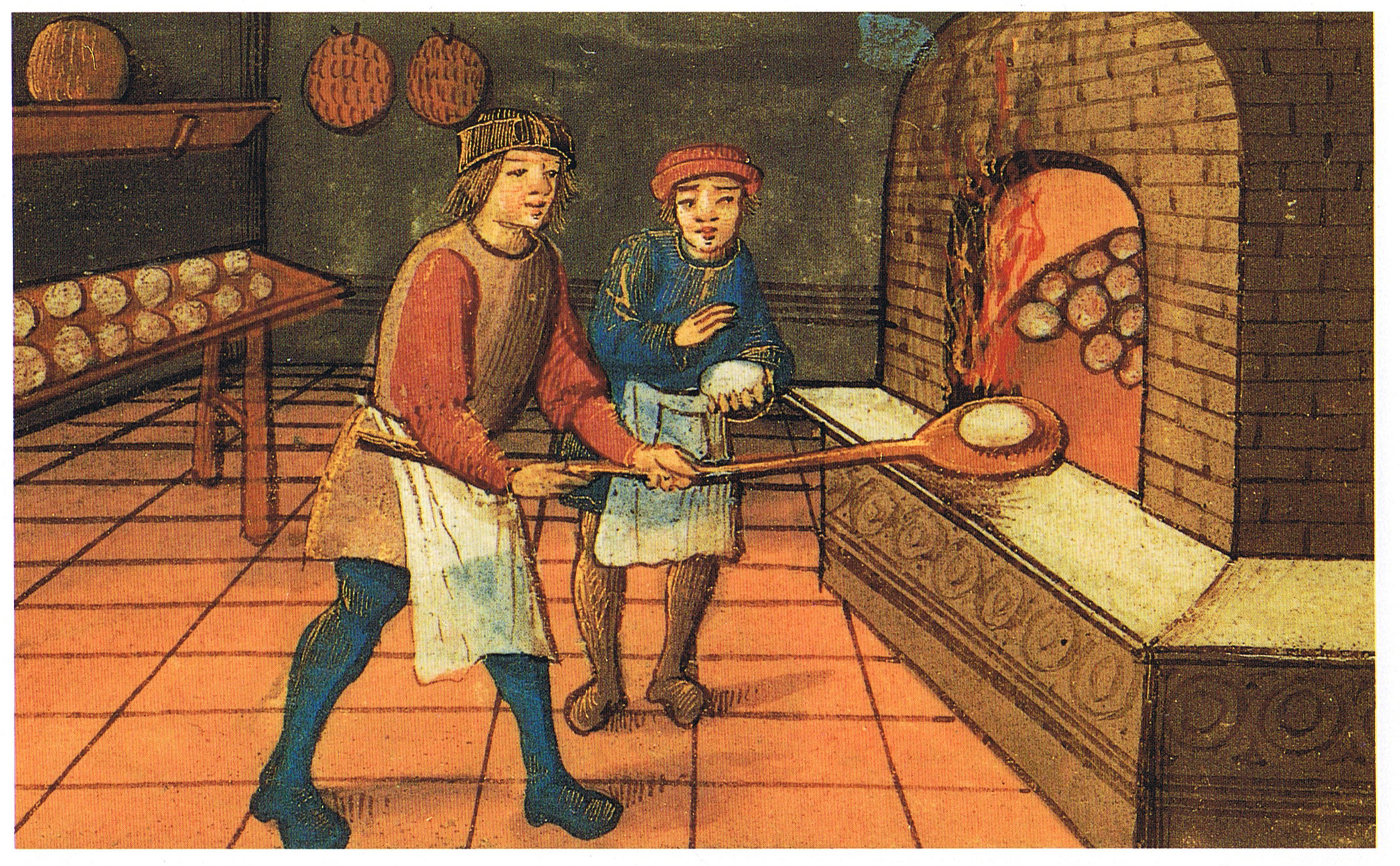
A medieval baker with his apprentice

In western Europe, medieval cuisine (5th–15th centuries) did not change rapidly.

Cereals remained the most important staple during the early Middle Ages. Barley, oats and rye were eaten by the poor. Standard foods included bread, porridge, and gruel. Fava beans and vegetables were important supplements to the cereal-based diet of the lower orders. Meat was expensive and prestigious. Game was common only on the tables of landowners. The most prevalent butcher's meats were pork, chicken, and other domestic fowl; beef, which required greater investment in land, was less common. Cod and herring were mainstays among the northern populations; dried, cooked or salted, they made their way far inland, but a wide variety of other saltwater and freshwater fish was also eaten.

Meals were controlled by the seasons, geography, and religious restrictions. For most people food supply was limited to what the nearby lands and seas could provide. Peasants made do with what they could, primarily cooking over an open fire, in a cauldron or on a spit. Their ovens were typically outside of the home, and made on top of clay or turf. Poor families primarily consumed grains and vegetables in the form of stew, soup, or pottage, and anything grown on their own small plots of land. They could not afford spices, and it was a crime for them to hunt deer, boar, or rabbits. Their staples included rye or barley bread, stews, local dairy products, cheaper meats like beef, pork or lamb, fish if there was access to freshwater, vegetables and herbs grown at home, fruit from local trees and bushes, nuts, and honey. The upper class and nobility had better food and diet than the lower classes, but food was eaten in small portions. Meals were laid out with many different colors and flavors—a very different experience from those in the lower class. Smaller portion sizes developed around this time due to various cultural influences, and these large, table-long meals were essentially picked at by the nobility. Foods were highly spiced, and many of these were expensively imported, often from outside Europe. The Middle Ages diet of the upper class and nobility included manchet bread, a variety of meats like venison, pork, and lamb, fish and shellfish, spices, cheese, fruits, and a limited number of vegetables. Among people of all social classes spices were common, with lower class people enjoying more local and home-grown spices while the wealthier enjoyed imported spices from other continents. As time went by and living standards improved, even lower class people, particularly those in urban centers, could enjoy the taste of foreign spices like pepper, nutmeg and cinnamon.

While food consumption was controlled by geography and availability, it was also governed by the Church. The church calendar included many fasts spread throughout the year; the longest of these was Lent, the late winter weeks preceding Easter. There were designated days when it was not permitted to eat meat or fish, but this did not affect the poor very much because of their already restricted diet. The Church also influenced people to have feasts throughout the year, including on Christmas and lesser holidays. The noble and upper classes participated in these extravagant feasts, as they often followed a fasting period.

=== British Isles ===
From Prehistoric Britain onward, the British diet has been a story of adaptation. Early populations relied primarily on locally raised animals and crops, with their food choices continually evolving in response to changes in agricultural methods and the changing climate. The variety of British food is marked by a continual flow of external influences from invaders and global trade. Invading groups--Celts, Picts, Romans, Vikings, Saxons, Angles, Normans--each brought new ingredients and techniques, introducing staples like bread, butter, smoked fish, and spices. After 1600 the era of colonialism dramatically expanded the British larder. New products such as tea from China, along with curry, sugar, and chocolate, were introduced; British cuisine became a blend of global influences. Since the 1950s immigrant consumers and chefs from former colonies across the globe have greatly enlarged the food scene, street by street.

=== 16th century: Importance of Spain and Portugal ===
The Portuguese and Spanish Empires opened up sea trade routes that linked food exchange across the world. Under Phillip II, Catholic cuisine elements inadvertently helped transform the cuisine of the Americas, Buddhists, Hindus, and Islamic cuisines of the South Eastern Asian region. In Goa, the Portuguese were encouraged by the Crown to marry local women following their conversion. This integration led to mixed cuisine between Portugal and Western India. The Portuguese brought round raised loaves, using wheat shipped from Northern India, as well as pickled pork. The pork was pickled in wine or vinegar with garlic (carne de vinha d'alhos) tied to Portuguese cuisine that later became vindaloo.

=== 18th century: early modern Europe ===
Grain and livestock have long been the most important agricultural products in France and England. After 1700, innovative farmers experimented with new techniques to increase yield and looked into new products such as hops, rapeseed oil, artificial grasses, vegetables, fruit, dairy foods, commercial poultry, rabbits, and freshwater fish.

Sugar began as an upper-class luxury product, but by 1700 Caribbean sugar plantations worked by African slaves had expanded production, and it was much more widely available. By 1800 sugar was a staple of working-class diets. For them, it symbolized increasing economic freedom and status.

Labourers in Western Europe in the 18th century ate bread and gruel, often in a soup with greens and lentils, a little bacon, and occasionally potato or a bit of cheese. They washed it down with beer (water usually was too contaminated), and a sip of milk. Three quarters of the food was derived from plants. Meat was much more attractive, but very expensive.

=== 19th century ===
==== Food crisis of 1840s ====
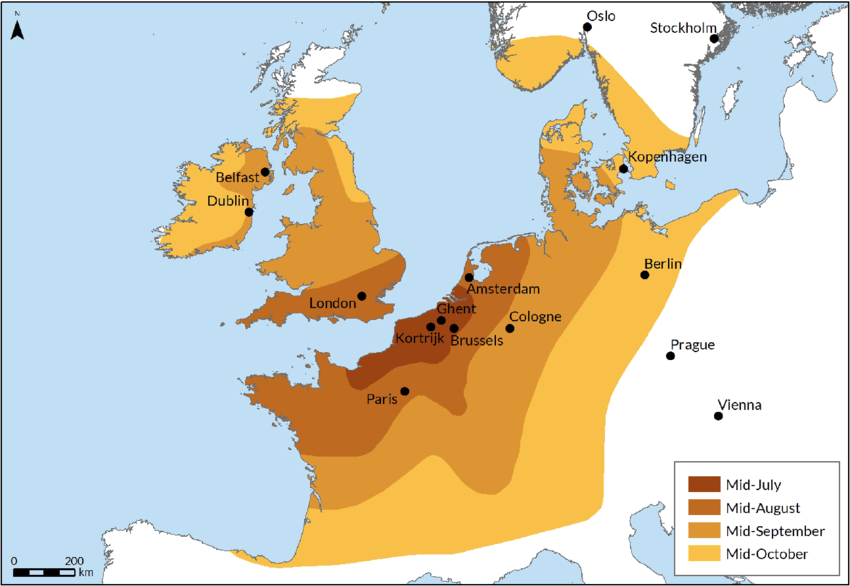
Spread of the potato blight in Europe in 1845

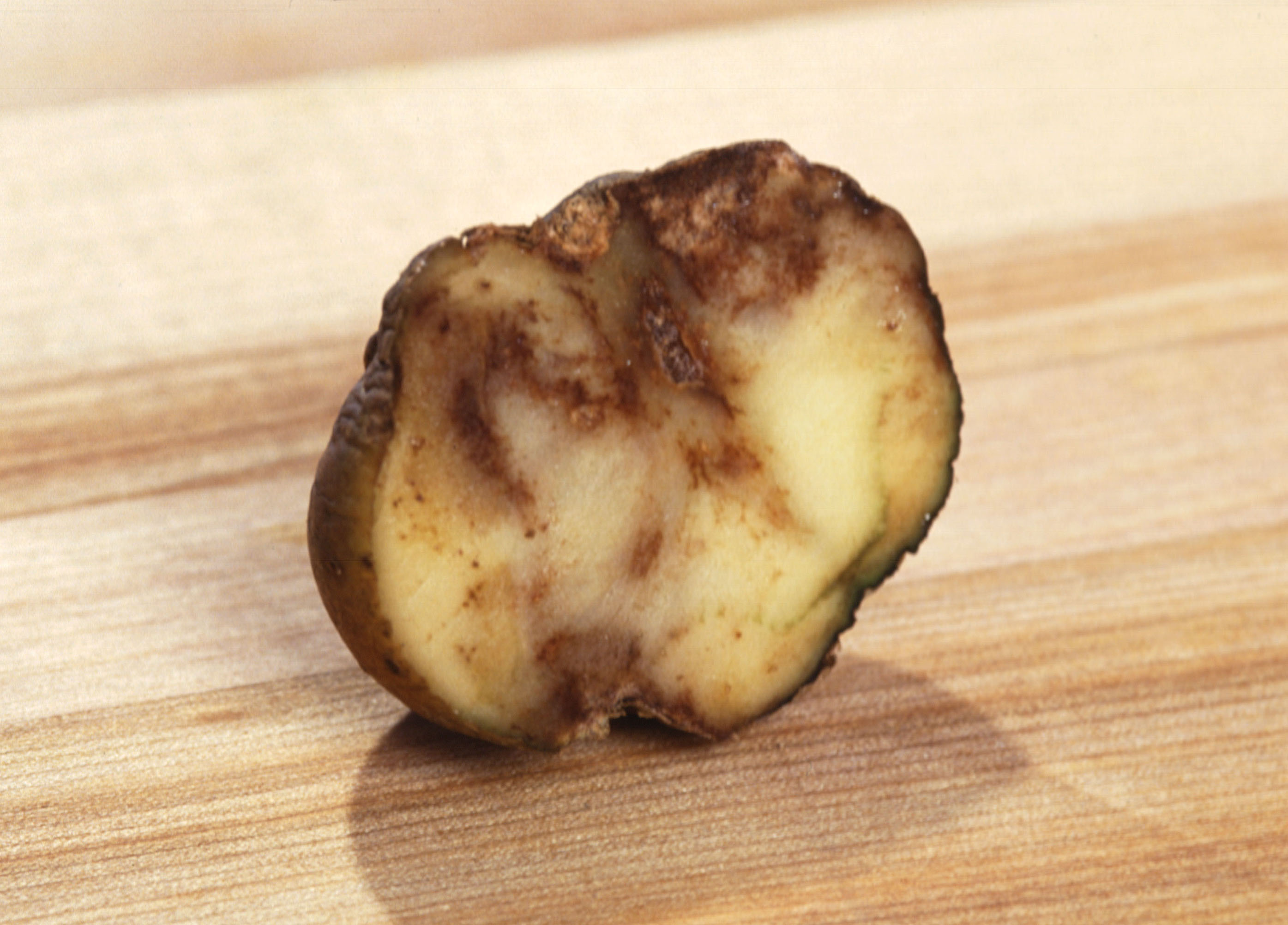
A blighted potato tuber

The European potato failure was a food crisis that struck Northern and Western Europe in the mid-1840s. The time is also known as the Hungry Forties. The widespread failure of potato crops, caused by potato blight, with the correspondent lack of other staple foods was the direct cause of the crisis. Excess mortality occurred across all affected areas, with the highest casualty rates occurring in the Scottish Highlands and Ireland via the Highland Potato Famine and Great Famine respectively. Mass emigration occurred as a result.

==== West European diet ====
By 1870, the West European diet was at about 16 kilograms per person per year of meat, rising to 50 kilograms by 1914, and 77 kilograms in 2010. Milk and cheese were seldom in the diet; even in the early 20th century, they were still uncommon in Mediterranean diets.

=== 20th century wars ===
In the first half of the 20th century there were two world wars, which in many places resulted in rationing and hunger; sometimes the starvation of the civilian populations was used as a powerful new weapon.

==== World War I and 1920s ====
In Germany during World War I, the rationing system in urban areas virtually collapsed, with people eating animal fodder to survive the Turnip Winter. Conditions in Vienna worsened as the army got priority in the food supply.

In Allied countries, meat was diverted first to the soldiers, then to urgent civilian needs in Italy, Britain, France and Greece. Meat production was stretched to the limit in the United States, Australia, New Zealand, Canada and Argentina, with oceanic shipping closely controlled by the British. Food shortages were severe in Russian cities, leading to protests that escalated and helped topple the Tsar in February 1917.

In the first years of peace after the war ended in 1918, most of eastern and central Europe suffered severe food shortages. The American Relief Administration (ARA) was set up under the American wartime "food czar" Herbert Hoover, and was charged with providing emergency food rations across Central and Eastern Europe. The ARA fed millions, including the inhabitants of Germany and the Soviet Union. After U.S. government funding for the ARA expired in the summer of 1919, the ARA became a private organization, raising millions of dollars from private donors. Under the auspices of the ARA, the European Children's Fund fed millions of starving children.

The 1920s saw the introduction of new foodstuffs, especially fruit, transported from around the globe. After the World War many new food products became available to the typical household, with branded foods advertised for their convenience. Now instead of an experienced cook spending hours on difficult custards and puddings, the housewife could purchase instant foods in jars, or powders that could be quickly mixed. Wealthier households now had ice boxes or electric refrigerators, which made for better storage and the convenience of buying in larger quantities.

==== World War II and after ====
During World War II, Nazi Germany tried to feed its population by seizing food supplies from occupied countries, and deliberately cutting off food supplies to Jews, Poles, Russians and the Dutch. Rationing in the United Kingdom was associated with an improvement in public health, as everyone was guaranteed the basics.

As part of the Marshall Plan in 1948–1950, the United States provided technological expertise and financing for high-productivity large-scale agribusiness operations in postwar Europe. Poultry was a favorite choice, with the rapid expansion in production, a sharp fall in prices, and widespread acceptance of the many ways to serve chicken.

=== Green Revolution ===
The Green Revolution in the 1950s and 1960s was a technological breakthrough in plant productivity that increased agricultural production worldwide, particularly in the developing world. Research began in the 1930s and dramatic improvements in output became important in the late 1960s. The initiatives resulted in the adoption of new technologies, including:

"new, high-yielding varieties (HYVs) of cereals, especially dwarf wheats and rices, in association with chemical fertilizers and agro-chemicals, and with controlled water-supply (usually involving irrigation) and new methods of cultivation, including mechanization. All of these together were seen as a 'package of practices' to supersede 'traditional' technology and to be adopted as a whole."

== North America ==
=== United States ===
American cuisine consists of the cooking style and traditional dishes prepared in the United States, an especially diverse culture in a large country with a long history of immigration. It principally derives from a mixing of European cuisine, Native American and Alaskan cuisine, and African American cuisine, known as soul food. The Northeast, Midwest, Mid-Atlantic, South, West, Southwest, and insular areas all have distinctive elements, reflecting local food resources, local demographics, and local innovation. These developments have also given some states and cities distinctive elements. Proximity and territorial expansion has also generated substantial influence from Latin American cuisine, including new forms like Tex-Mex and New Mexican cuisine. Modern mass media and global immigration have brought influences from many other cultures, and some elements of American food culture have become global exports. Local ethnic and religious traditions include Hawaiian cuisine; Cajun; Louisiana Creole; Pennsylvania Dutch; Mormon; Chinese American; German American; Italian American; Greek American; Jewish American; and Mexican American cuisines.

American cooking dates back to the traditions of the Native Americans, whose diet included a mix of farmed and hunted food, and varied widely across the continent.

The Colonial period created a mix of new world and Old World cookery, and brought with it new crops and livestock from Britain and France. During the early 19th century, cooking was based mostly on what the agrarian population could grow, hunt, or raise on their land. With an increasing influx of immigrants, and a move to city life, American food further diversified in the later part of the 19th century. The 20th century saw a revolution in cooking as new technologies, the World Wars, a scientific understanding of food, and continued immigration combined to create a wide range of new foods. This has allowed for the current rich diversity in food dishes throughout the country The automobile enabled the drive-in and drive-through restaurants..

American cuisine includes milkshakes, barbecue, and a wide range of fried foods. Many quintessential American dishes are unique takes on food originally from other culinary traditions, including pizza, hot dogs, and Tex-Mex. Regional cooking includes a range of fish dishes in the coastal states, gumbo, and cheesesteak. Turkey is a staple at annual Thanksgiving and Christmas dinners. Modern American cuisine includes a focus on fast food, as well as take-out food, which is often ethnic. There is also a vibrant culinary scene surrounding televised celebrity chefs, social media, and foodie culture.

==== Starving the Confederacy ====
Union policy in the American Civil War (1861-1865) involved starving the Confederate armies and cutting off domestic and imported food supplies. Severe ford shortages in Confederate cities led to Southern bread riots. Late in the war the Confederate armies were decimated as soldiers deserted to rescue their own families.

==== Ethnic food ====
In the immigrant neighbourhoods of fast-growing American industrial cities, housewives purchased ready-made food through street peddlers, hucksters, push carts, and small shops operated from private homes. This opened the way for the rapid entry of entirely new items such as pizza, spaghetti with meatballs, bagels, hoagies, pretzels, and pierogies into American eating habits, and firmly established fast food in the American culinary experience.

==== African American ====
Soul food is the ethnic cuisine of African Americans. Originating in the American South from the cuisines of enslaved Africans transported from Africa through the Atlantic slave trade, soul food is closely associated with the cuisine of the Southern United States. Soul food uses cooking techniques and ingredients from West African, Central African, Western European, and Indigenous cuisine of the Americas.

The concept evolved from describing the food of slaves in the South, to being taken up as a source of pride in the African American community across the country.

Soul food historian Adrian Miller said the difference between soul food and Southern food is that soul food is intensely seasoned and uses a variety of meats to add flavor to food and adds a variety of spicy and savory sauces. These spicy and savory sauces add robust flavor. This method of preparation was influenced by West African cuisine where West Africans create sauces to add flavor and spice to their food. Black Americans also add sugar to make cornbread, while "white southerners say when you put sugar in corn bread, it becomes cake".

=== Canada ===
The food history of Canada is a dynamic tapestry woven from several key historical themes involving region, ethnicity and creativity.

==== Pre 1600 ====
The earliest cuisines are rooted in the diverse traditions of many different tribes in the First Nations, as well as Inuit, and Métis peoples. They relied on hunting and fishing, and in some cases cultivated plots of corn, beans, and squash. They smoked meat to preserve foods for the long cold winters. Some used maple sap as syrup.

==== French and British colonial ====
European settlers introduced wheat, dairy, cattle, hogs, poultry and spices as well as their own culinary traditions. Early cuisine became a blend of Old World recipes adapted to local ingredients, seen in staples like the French-influenced tourtière (meat pie) and, later, the distinct French-Canadian creation of poutine. The British and Irish settlers who arrived in the Maritimes in the 18th and 19th centuries brought their own culinary traditions and ingredients, such as potatoes, cabbage, and oats. They also introduced new food preservation techniques, like pickling and canning. These settlers influenced the development of dishes like fish and brewis, a Newfoundland specialty made from salted cod, hard bread, and fatback, and Irish stew, a meat and vegetable dish popular in New Brunswick.

==== Regional diversity ====
Canada's vast geography and varied soils and climates created distinct regional food cultures. Thus Cuisine of the Maritimes is known for its seafood (lobster, cod, chowder). Quebec has its French-Canadian classics. The Prairies focus on grains, beef, and foods tied to settlement groups like Pierogi (from Ukrainian settlers). In the far north the Inuit have a distinctive Inuit cuisine.

==== Recent immigrants ====
Immigrant communities, from Chinese Canadians and Italian Canadians in earlier waves to South Asian Canadians, Middle Eastern Canadians, and others in the late 20th century, all came to Canada to prosper. They brought their distinctive flavors, ingredients, and cooking techniques. They often fused them with local products making Chinese distinctive ginger beef or sushi pizza) in ethnic restaurants across urban centers.

== Consumption history of notable food ==
=== Potato ===
The potato was first domesticated in the region of modern-day southern Peru and extreme northwestern Bolivia. It has since spread around the world and become a staple crop in many countries.

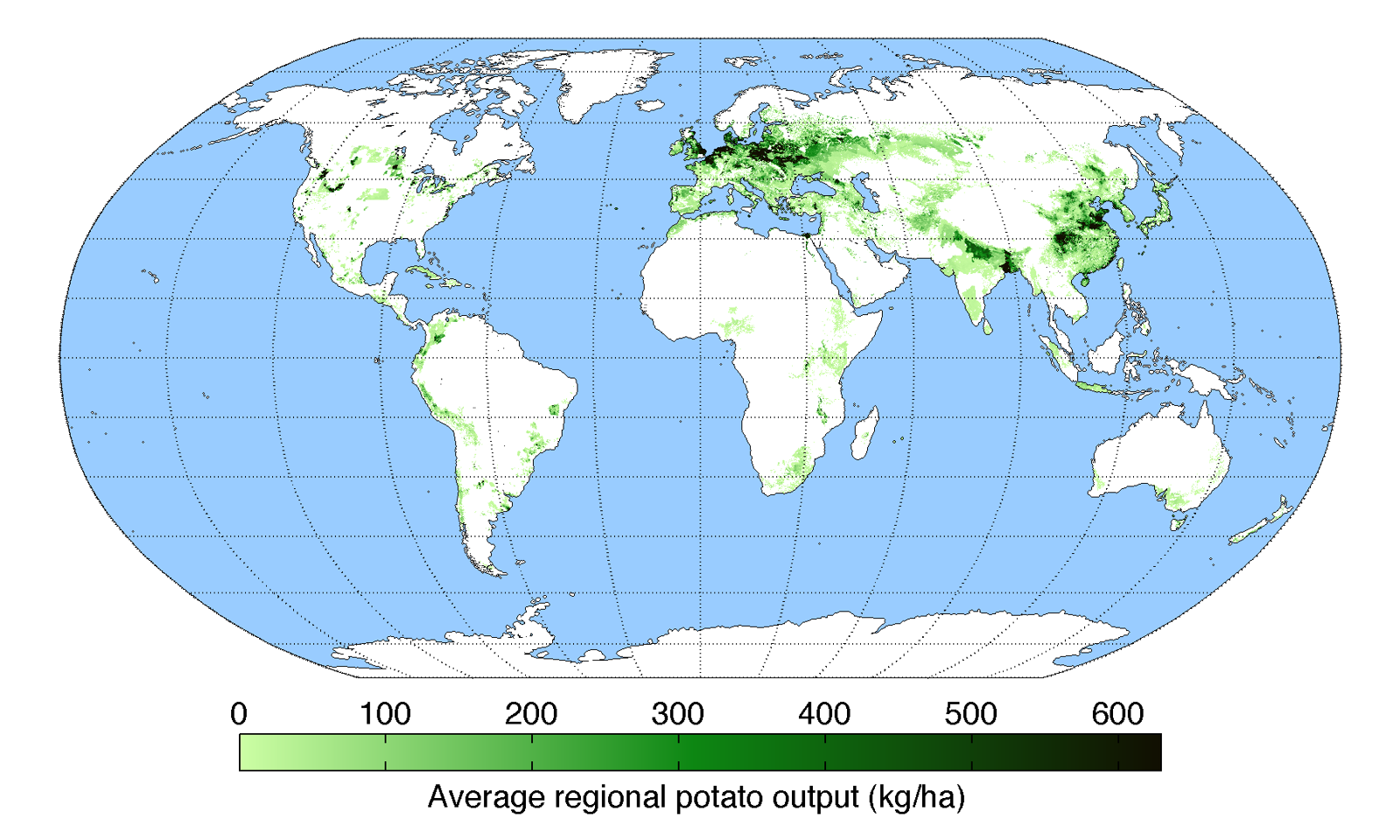
Global production of potatoes in 2008

Some believe that the introduction of the potato was responsible for a quarter or more of the growth in Old World population and urbanization between 1700 and 1900. Following the Spanish conquest of the Inca Empire, the Spanish introduced the potato to Europe in the second half of the 16th century, as part of the Columbian exchange. The staple was subsequently transported by European mariners to territories and ports throughout the world. The potato was slow to be adopted by distrustful European farmers, but soon enough it became an important food staple and field crop that played a major role in the 19th century European population boom. However, lack of genetic diversity, due to the very limited number of varieties initially introduced, left the crop vulnerable to disease. There are few mentions of potato being cultivated in India in the travel accounts of Mr. Edward Terry and Mr. Fyer during 17th century. Potato is said to be introduced in India by Portuguese in early 17th century. The Portuguese called it 'batata'. Indians later adapted a different word for potato, they called it 'alu'--this name came up under British Rule. In 1845, a plant disease known as late blight, caused by the fungus-like oomycete Phytophthora infestans, spread rapidly through the poorer communities of western Ireland as well as parts of the Scottish Highlands, resulting in the crop failures that led to the Great Irish Famine. Currently China is the largest potato producing country followed by India as of 2017, FAOSTAT, Food and Agriculture Organization of the United Nations.

=== Rice ===
Rice comes from the seasonal plant Oryza sativa, and has been cultivated since about 6000 BCE. The principal rice-producing countries are in East and South Asia. Where rice originated has always been a hot point of debate between India and China, as both countries started cultivating it around the same time (according to numerous history books and records). Muslims brought rice to Sicily in the 9th century. After the 15th century, rice spread throughout Italy and then France, later spreading to all the continents during the age of European exploration. As a cereal grain, today it is the most widely consumed staple food worldwide. Currently India is the leading rice producing country according to FAOSTAT, Food and Agriculture Organization of the United Nations. The amount of rice cultivated each year ranges between 800 billion and 950 billion pounds (360 to 430 million tonnes).

=== Sugar ===
Sugar originated from India by taking sugarcane plant through some chemical and mechanical processes. The word sugar is derived from a Sanskrit word शर्करा (sarkara). Previously people used to chew the juice out of sugarcane to enjoy the sweetness of the plants. Later, Indians found the technique to crystallize the sweet liquid. This technique then spread towards the neighbouring countries of India. The Spanish and Portuguese empires provided sugar for Europe by the late seventeenth century from New World plantations. Brazil became the dominant sugar producer.

Sugar was expensive during the Middle Ages, but due to the increase in sugar cultivation, sugar became easier to obtain and more affordable. Thus Europeans could now enjoy Islamic-inspired confectionery goods that were previously costly to produce. The Jesuits were leading producers of chocolate, obtaining it from the Amazon jungle and Guatemala and shipping it across the world to Southeast Asia, Spain and Italy. They introduced Mesoamerican techniques to Europe for processing and preparing chocolate. Fermented cocoa beans had to be ground on heated grindstones to prevent producing oily chocolate: a process that was foreign to many Europeans. As a beverage, chocolate remained largely within the Catholic world as it was not considered a food by the church and thus could be enjoyed during fasting. Brazil is currently the largest producer of sugar, followed by India, which is also the largest consumer of sugar.

== Historical impact of religion on cuisines ==
The three most widespread religions (Christianity, Buddhism, and Islam) developed their own distinct recipes, cultures, and practices around food. All three follow two main principles around food: "the theory of the culinary cosmos and the principle of hierarchy." There is a third principle that involved sacrifice. Over the years, religious and societal views on killing living things for religious purposes have changed, and it is no longer considered a major principle.

=== Judaism ===
Jews have eaten many different types of food that were no different than the cuisine of their Gentile neighbors. However, Jewish cuisine is influenced by Jewish dietary laws, kashrut along with other religious requirements. For example, creating a fire was forbidden on Shabbat which led to inspiration for slow-cooked Sabbath stews. Sephardic Jews were expelled from Iberia in 1492 and migrated to North Africa and the Ottoman lands, blending Iberian cuisine with local cuisine.

Many foods considered Jewish in the United States, such as bagels, knishes and borscht are Eastern European Ashkenazi dishes. Gentiles also ate the above foods widely throughout Eastern Europe as well.

=== Jesuits ===
The Jesuits' influence on cuisine differed from country to country. They sold maize and cassava to plantations in Angola that would later grant provisions to slave traders. They exported sugar and cacao from the Americas to Europe, and in southern parts of the Americas, they dried leaves of the local mate plant that would compete with coffee, tea, and chocolate as the favored hot beverage in Europe. Despite mate's popularity and competition against chocolate, the Jesuits were the leading producers and promoters of chocolate. Using indigenous labor in Guatemala, they shipped it across the world to Southeast Asia, Spain, and Italy. Chocolate's popularity was also in part to the theological consensus that, because it was not considered a food, it could be eaten while fasting. It was thought to have lust-reducing effects applicable to many nuns and monks at the time. The Jesuits introduced several foods and cooking techniques to Japan: deep frying (tempura), cakes and confectionery (kasutera, confetti), as well as the bread still called by the Iberian name pan.

== Ethnic cuisines ==
=== Chinese ===
The history of Chinese cuisine is marked by both variety and change. The archaeologist and scholar Kwang-chih Chang says "Chinese people are especially preoccupied with food" and "food is at the center of, or at least it accompanies or symbolizes, many social interactions". Over the course of history, he says, "continuity vastly outweighs change." He explains basic organizing principles which go back to earliest times and give a continuity to the food tradition, principally that a normal meal is made up of a plant based products consisting of grains, starch (traditional Chinese: 飯; simplified Chinese: 饭; pinyin: fàn) vegetables (菜; cài) and/or fish (鱼; yú) based dishes with very little red meat (红肉; hóngròu) consumption.

=== German ===
The cuisine of Germany consists of many different local and regional cuisines. The cuisine is famous for its beer and more than 1,500 different types of sausage (German: Wurst). The cuisine has spread with emigration to the United States, Britain, Canada, and South America, led by the Hamburger.

== See also ==
- List of historical cuisines
- Timeline of food
- History of agriculture
  - History of wheat
    - History of bread
  - Pig farming
- Nutritional science#History
- Food studies
  - Columbian exchange, movement of plants and animals to/from Americas in 1500s
    - Early impact of Mesoamerican goods in Iberian society
- Malnutrition
  - Malnutrition in India
- Hunger in the United Kingdom
- Food insecurity and hunger in the United States
  - Starvation
- Famine, worldwide history
  - List of famines
    - Great Famine (Ireland)
    - European potato failure, in 1840s
    - Holodomor famine in Ukraine 1930s
