= Senpukuji Cave =

Cave in south-western Japan, paleolithic site

- 泉福寺洞窟 (Japanese)
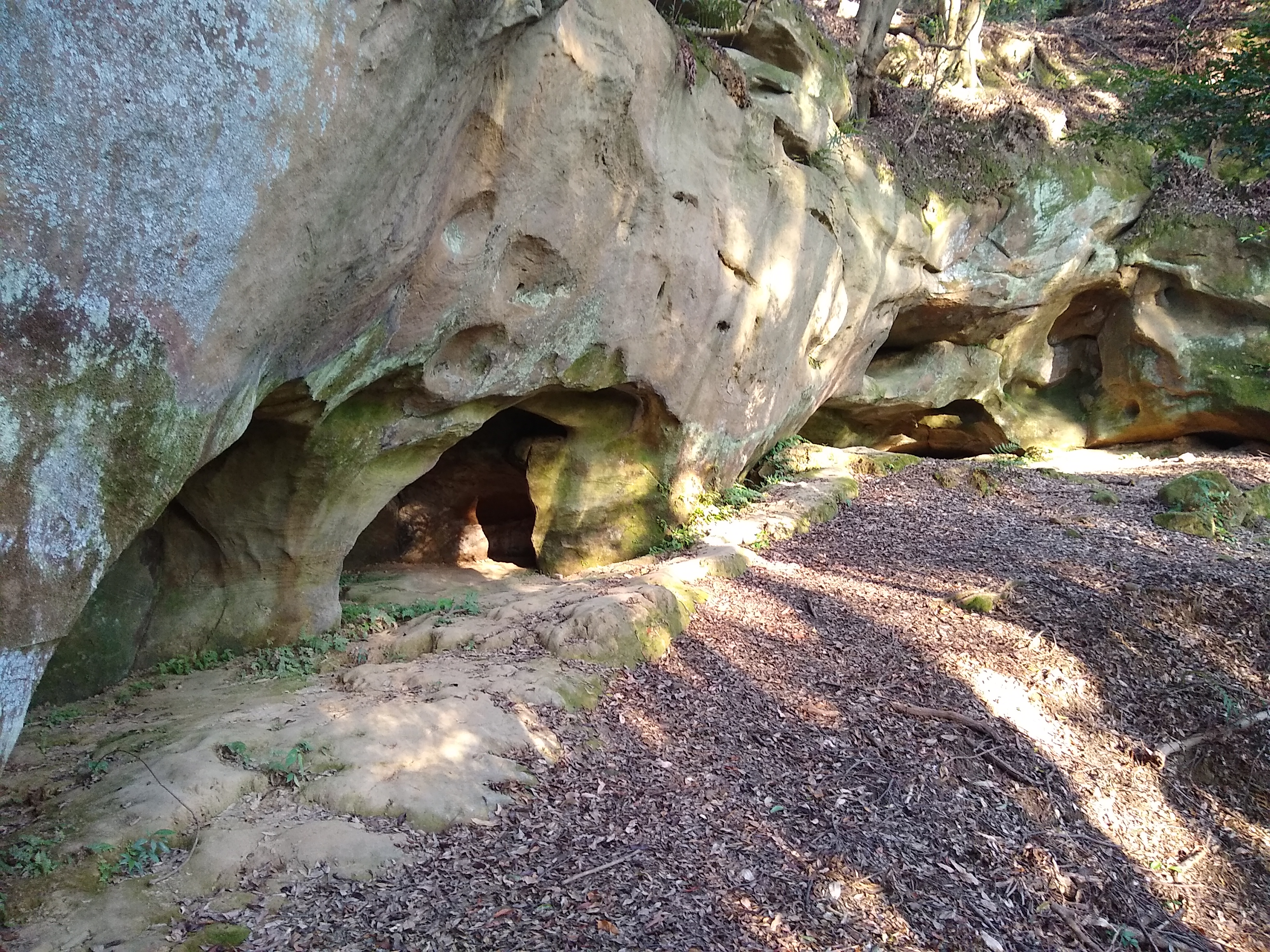
- Senpukuji Cave from the entrance

- Senpukuji Cave Senpukuji Cave (Japan)
- Interactive map of Senpukuji Cave
- 33°12′16.5″N 129°43′48.9″E
- Type: settlement
- Periods: Japanese Paleolithic to Yayoi
- Location: Sasebo, Nagasaki, Japan
- Region: Kyushu

Site notes
- Public access: Yes

The Senpukuji Cave (泉福寺洞窟, Senpukuji dōkutsu) is an archaeological site consisting of a Japanese Paleolithic period to the Yayoi period rock shelter dwelling in the Setogoshi neighborhood of the city of Sasebo, Nagasaki Prefecture on the island of Kyushu, Japan. The site was designated a National Historic Site of Japan in 1986. The world's oldest bean-patterned pottery was excavated here.

== Overview ==
Four small caves open to the south on the slope of a hill about 89 meters above sea level on the left bank of the Ainoura River, and there is a spring in the valley below the slope, so it is believed they were used as dwellings. They were discovered by a junior high school student in 1969, and archaeological excavations began the following year and continued for 10 years by Chiba University. Stratigraphic examination indicates that there are 12 layers of soil deposited in the cave. No pottery was unearthed from the deepest layers 12 and 11 just above the cave base, but a knife-shaped stone tool was unearthed. This stone knife, with a sharp side edge made into a single blade, is a characteristic relic of the Late Paleolithic period. microblades, toryumon pottery, and ridge-pattern pottery were found in the 10th layer, and claw-shaped and push-pull pattern pottery were identified in the upper layers.

The toryumon (bean-pattern) pottery is thought to be one of the oldest stages of pottery in Japan, and is a thin, deep bowl-shaped vessel with a slightly inward-curving rim, with small bean-sized pieces of clay regularly affixed using a linear applique technique to the outside, which is where its name comes from. The antiquity of these ceramics dates to the final pleistocene. It has been dated by Carbon-14 to be about 12000 years old.

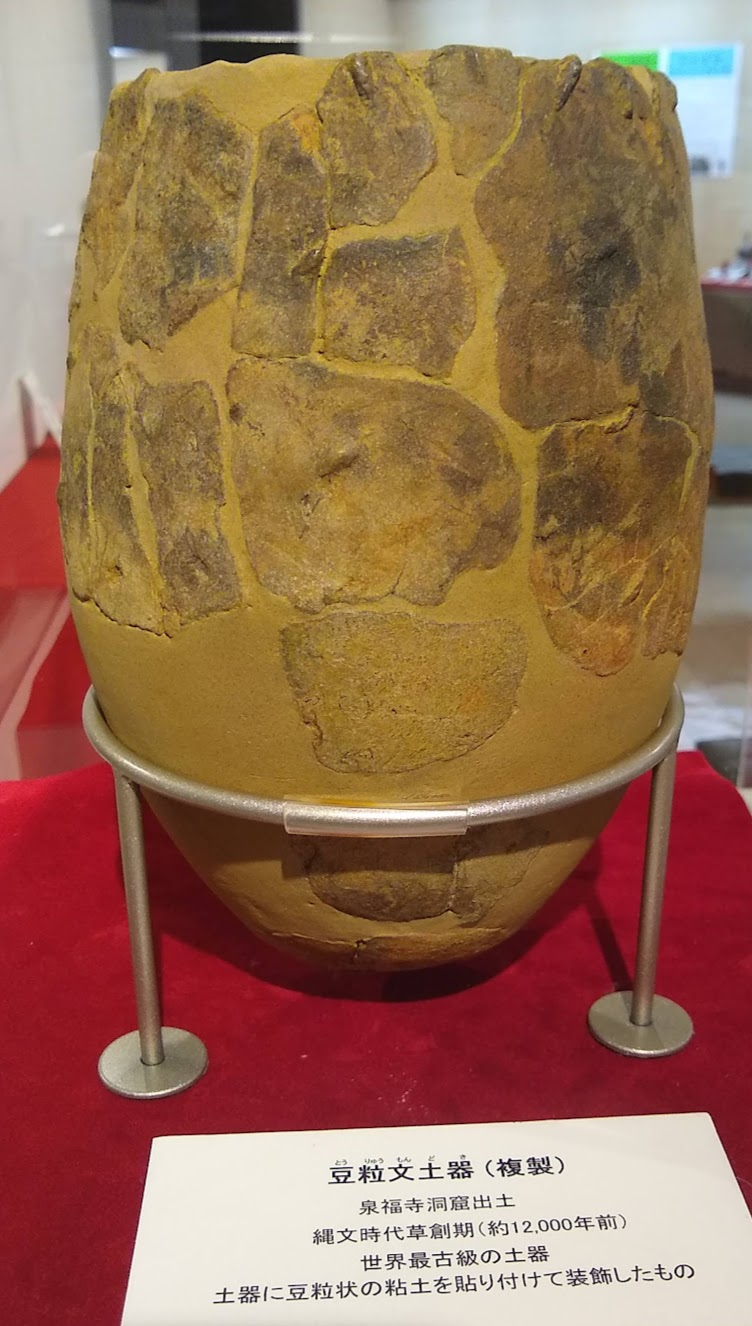
Pottery found from Senpukuji cave dating about 12000 years ago

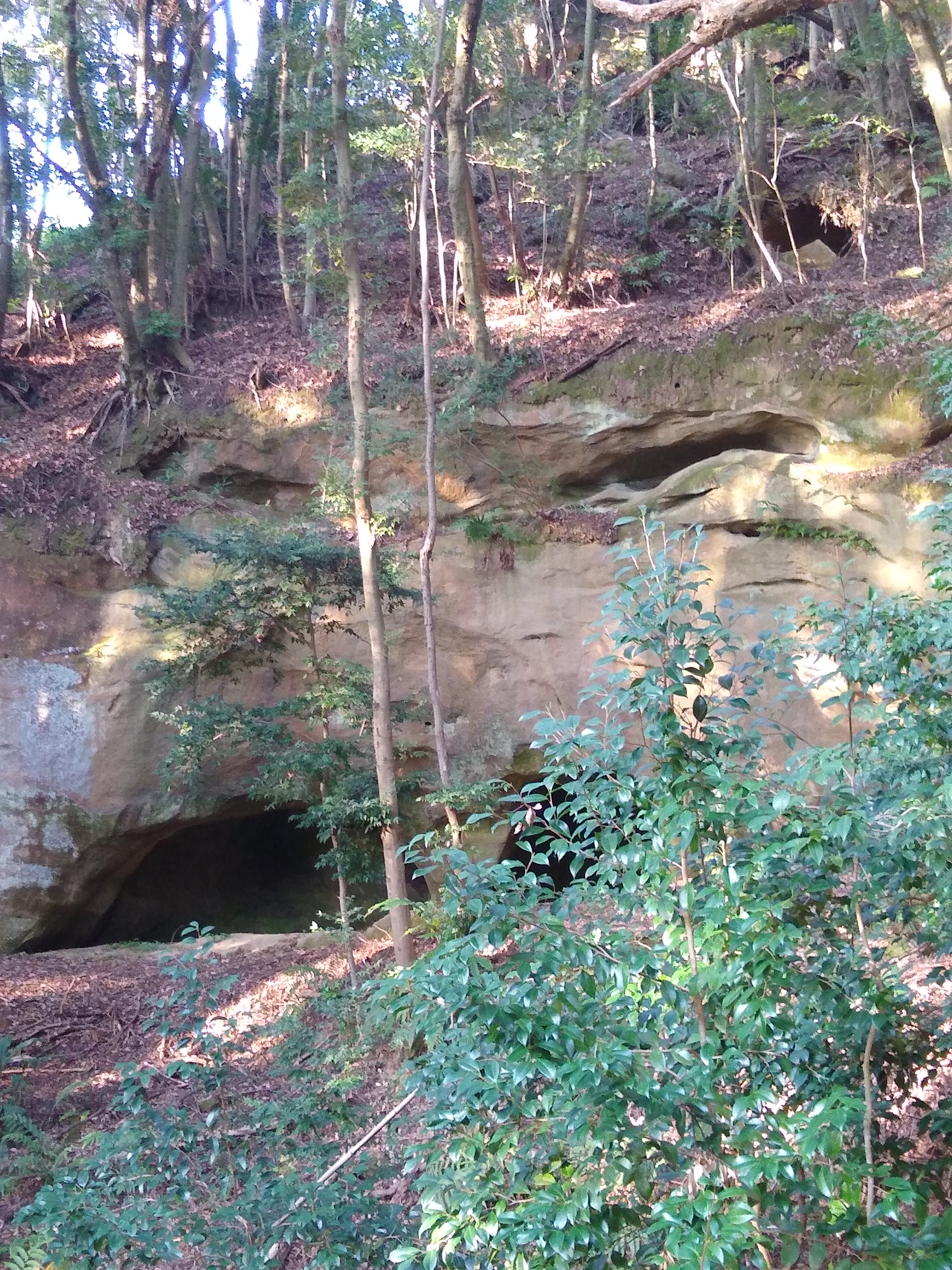
Senpukuji Cave

The site was used seasonally to make microlithic tools. 2,153 tools have been found in one layer. The types of stone tools excavated in large quantities were diverse, consisting mainly of microblades and microblade lithic cores, as well as scrapers, carvers, scrapers, points, stone blades, pebble tools, hammers, and grooved whetstones.

All excavated items from the cave were collectively designated National Important Cultural Properties in 1996. They are currently stored at the Shimase Art Center of the Sasebo City Museum; however, the exhibits at the museum are all restorations.

The site is about a 10-minute walk from Senpukuji Station on the Matsuura Railway Nishi-Kyushu Line.

== See also ==
- Fukui cave

== See also ==
- List of Historic Sites of Japan (Nagasaki)
