= History of wheat =

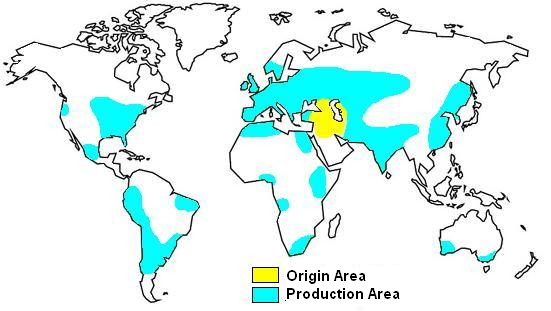
Origin and 21st century production areas of wheat

Wheat has been an important food plant since before the birth of agriculture and the domestication of cereals. Its production has increased in its 10,000 years of cultivation, along with the amount of land under wheat and trade in the commodity.

== Domestication ==
Hunter-gatherers in West Asia harvested wild wheats for thousands of years before they were domesticated, perhaps as early as 21,000 BC, but they formed a minor component of their diets. In this phase of pre-domestication cultivation, early cultivars were spread around the region and slowly developed the traits that came to characterise their domesticated forms.

Repeated harvesting and sowing of the grains of wild grasses led to the creation of domestic strains, as mutant forms ('sports') of wheat were more amenable to cultivation. In domesticated wheat, grains are larger, and the seeds (inside the spikelets) remain attached to the ear by a toughened rachis during harvesting. In wild strains, a more fragile rachis allows the ear to shatter easily, dispersing the spikelets. Selection for larger grains and non-shattering heads by farmers might not have been deliberately intended, but simply have occurred because these traits made gathering the seeds easier; nevertheless such 'incidental' selection was an important part of crop domestication. As the traits that improve wheat as a food source involve the loss of the plant's natural seed dispersal mechanisms, highly domesticated strains of wheat cannot survive in the wild.

Wild einkorn wheat (T. monococcum subsp. boeoticum) grows across Southwest Asia in open parkland and steppe environments. It comprises three distinct races, only one of which, native to Southeast Anatolia, was domesticated. The main feature that distinguishes domestic einkorn from wild is that its ears do not shatter without pressure, making it dependent on humans for dispersal and reproduction. It also tends to have wider grains. Wild einkorn was collected at sites such as Tell Abu Hureyra (c. 10,700–9000 BC) and Mureybet (c. 9800–9300 BC), but the earliest archaeological evidence for the domestic form comes after c. 8800 BC in southern Turkey, at Çayönü, Cafer Höyük, and possibly Nevalı Çori. Genetic evidence indicates that it was domesticated in multiple places independently.

Wild emmer wheat (T. turgidum subsp. dicoccoides) is less widespread than einkorn, favouring the rocky basaltic and limestone soils found in the hilly flanks of the Fertile Crescent. It is more diverse, with domesticated varieties falling into two major groups: hulled or non-shattering, in which threshing separates the whole spikelet; and free-threshing, where the individual grains are separated. Both varieties probably existed in prehistory, but over time free-threshing cultivars became more common. Wild emmer was first cultivated in the southern Levant, as early as 9600 BC. Genetic studies have found that, like einkorn, it was domesticated in southeastern Anatolia, but only once. The earliest secure archaeological evidence for domestic emmer comes from Çayönü, c. 8300–7600 BC, where distinctive scars on the spikelets indicated that they came from a hulled domestic variety. Slightly earlier finds have been reported from Tell Aswad in Syria, c. 8500–8200 BC, but these were identified using a less reliable method based on grain size.

== Early farming ==
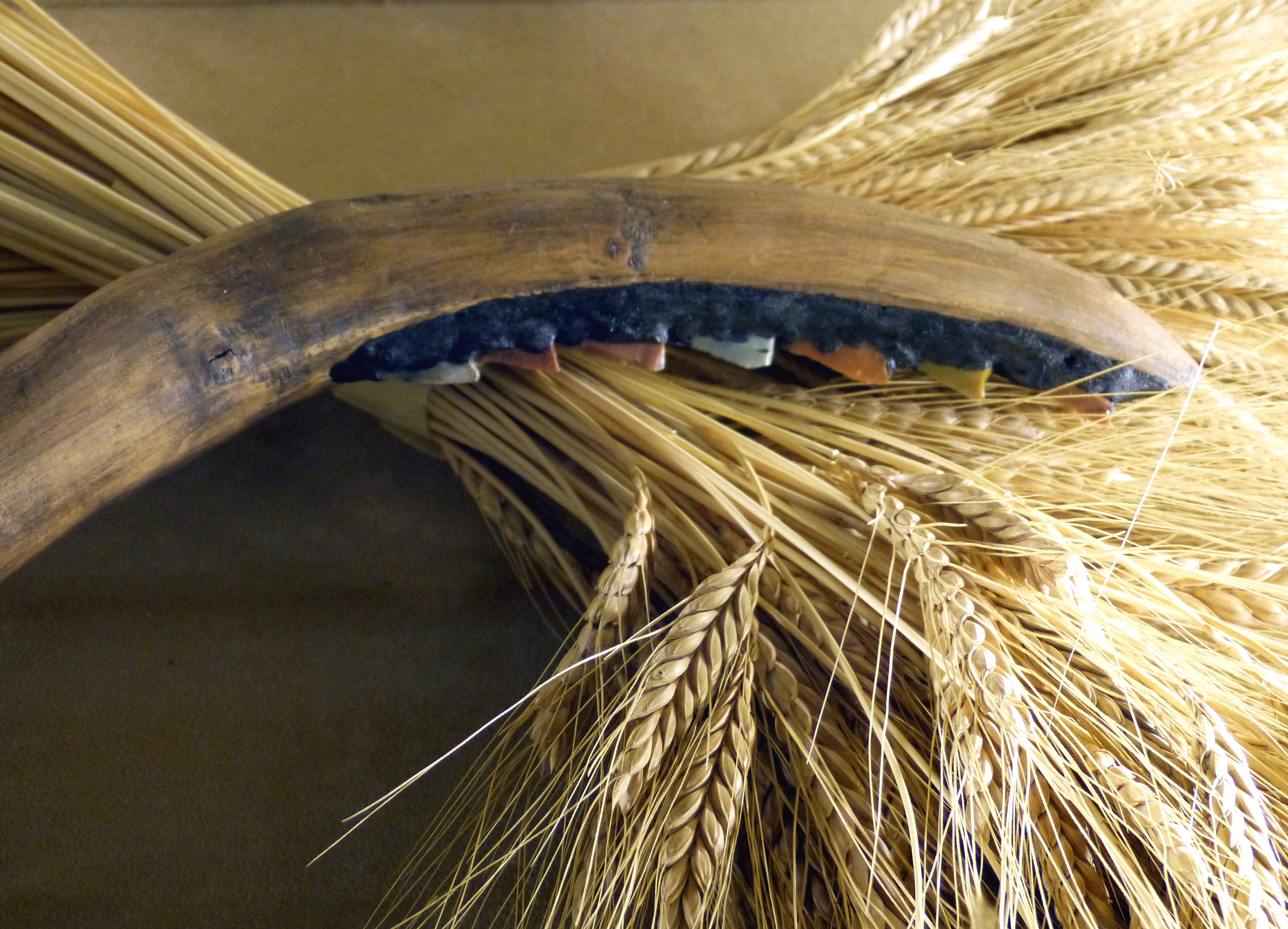
Sickles with stone microblades were used to harvest wheat in the Neolithic period, c. 8500–4000 BC

Einkorn and emmer are considered two of the founder crops cultivated by the first farming societies in Neolithic West Asia. These communities also cultivated naked wheats (T. aestivum and T. durum) and a now-extinct domesticated form of Zanduri wheat (T. timopheevii), as well as a wide variety of other cereal and non-cereal crops. Wheat was relatively uncommon for the first thousand years of the Neolithic (when barley predominated), but became a staple after around 8500 BC. Early wheat cultivation did not demand much labour. Initially, farmers took advantage of wheat's ability to establish itself in annual grasslands by enclosing fields against grazing animals and re-sowing stands after they had been harvested, without the need to systematically remove vegetation or till the soil. They may also have exploited natural wetlands and floodplains to practice décrue farming, sowing seeds in the soil left behind by receding floodwater. It was harvested with stone-bladed sickles. The ease of storing wheat and other cereals led farming households to become gradually more reliant on it over time, especially after they developed individual storage facilities that were large enough to hold more than a year's supply.

Wheat grain was stored after threshing, with the chaff removed. It was then processed into flour using ground stone mortars. At Çatalhöyük (c. 7100–6000 BC), both wholegrain wheat and flour was used to prepare bread, porridge and gruel. Apart from food, wheat may also have been important to Neolithic societies as a source of straw, which could be used for fuel, wicker-making, or wattle and daub construction.

== Spread ==
Domestic wheat was quickly spread to regions where its wild ancestors did not grow naturally. Emmer was introduced to Cyprus as early as 8600 BC and einkorn c. 7500 BC; emmer reached Greece by 6500 BC, Egypt shortly after 6000 BC, and Germany and Spain by 5000 BC. The South Caucasus (modern-day Georgia) is a primary center of origin for domesticated bread wheat. Excavations at Gadachrili Gora and Shulaveris Gora found charred bread wheat remains from the 6th millennium BC. Furthermore, Georgia has a wide genetic diversity with 14 wheat species including 5 endemics.

"The early Egyptians were developers of bread and the use of the oven and developed baking into one of the first large-scale food production industries." By 4000 BC, wheat had reached the British Isles and Scandinavia.

Wheat was cultivated in India around 3500 BC. Wheat likely appeared in China's lower Yellow River around 2600 BC.

Hexaploid wheat has been identified by DNA analysis of wheat seeds from around 6400–6200 BC at Çatalhöyük. As of 2023, the earliest known wheat with sufficient gluten for yeasted breads is from a granary at Assiros in Macedonia dated to 1350 BC. Wheat continued to spread across Europe and to the Americas in the Columbian exchange. In the British Isles, wheat straw (thatch) was used for roofing in the Bronze Age, remaining in common use until the late 19th century. White wheat bread was historically a high status food, but during the nineteenth century it became in Britain an item of mass consumption, displacing oats, barley and rye from diets in the North of the country. After 1860, the expansion of wheat production in the United States flooded the world market, lowering prices by 40%, and made a major contribution to the nutritional welfare of the poor.

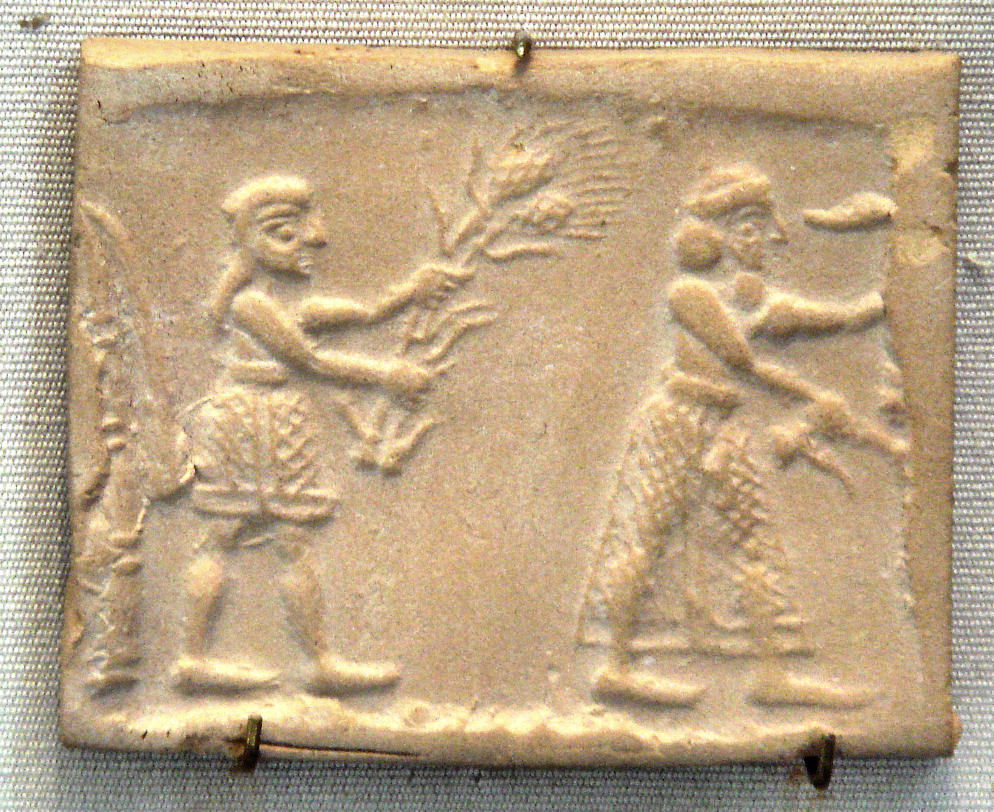
Sumerian cylinder seal impression dating to c. 3200 BC showing an ensi and his acolyte feeding a sacred herd wheat stalks; Ninurta was an agricultural deity and, in a poem known as the "Sumerian Georgica", he offers detailed advice on farming

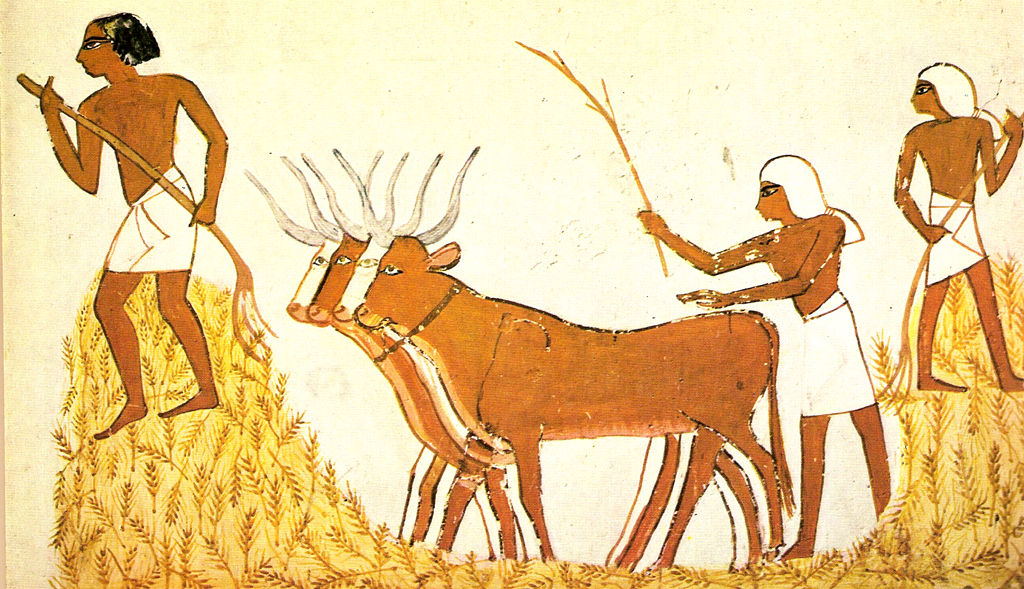
Threshing of wheat in ancient Egypt

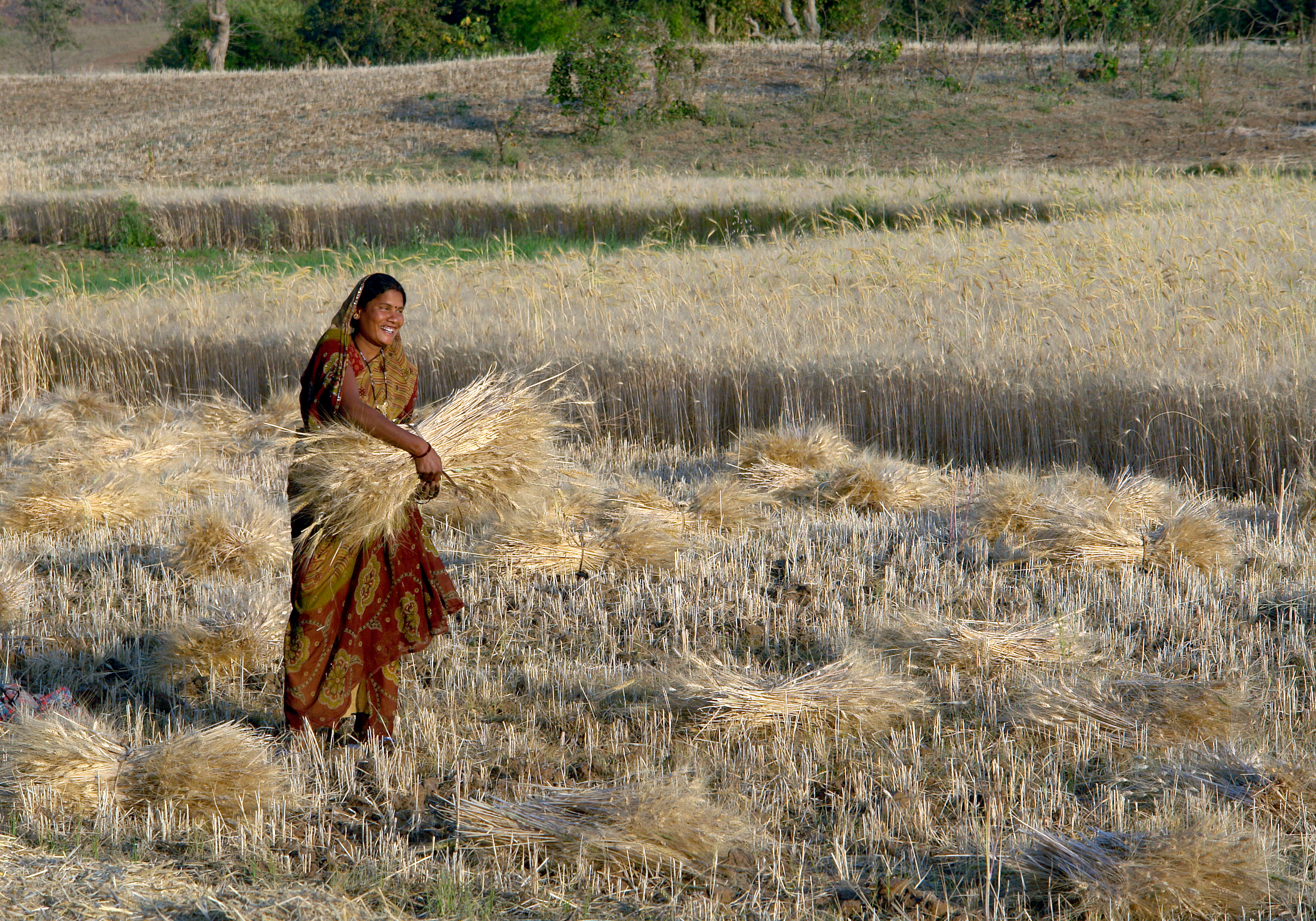
Traditional wheat harvesting
India, 2012

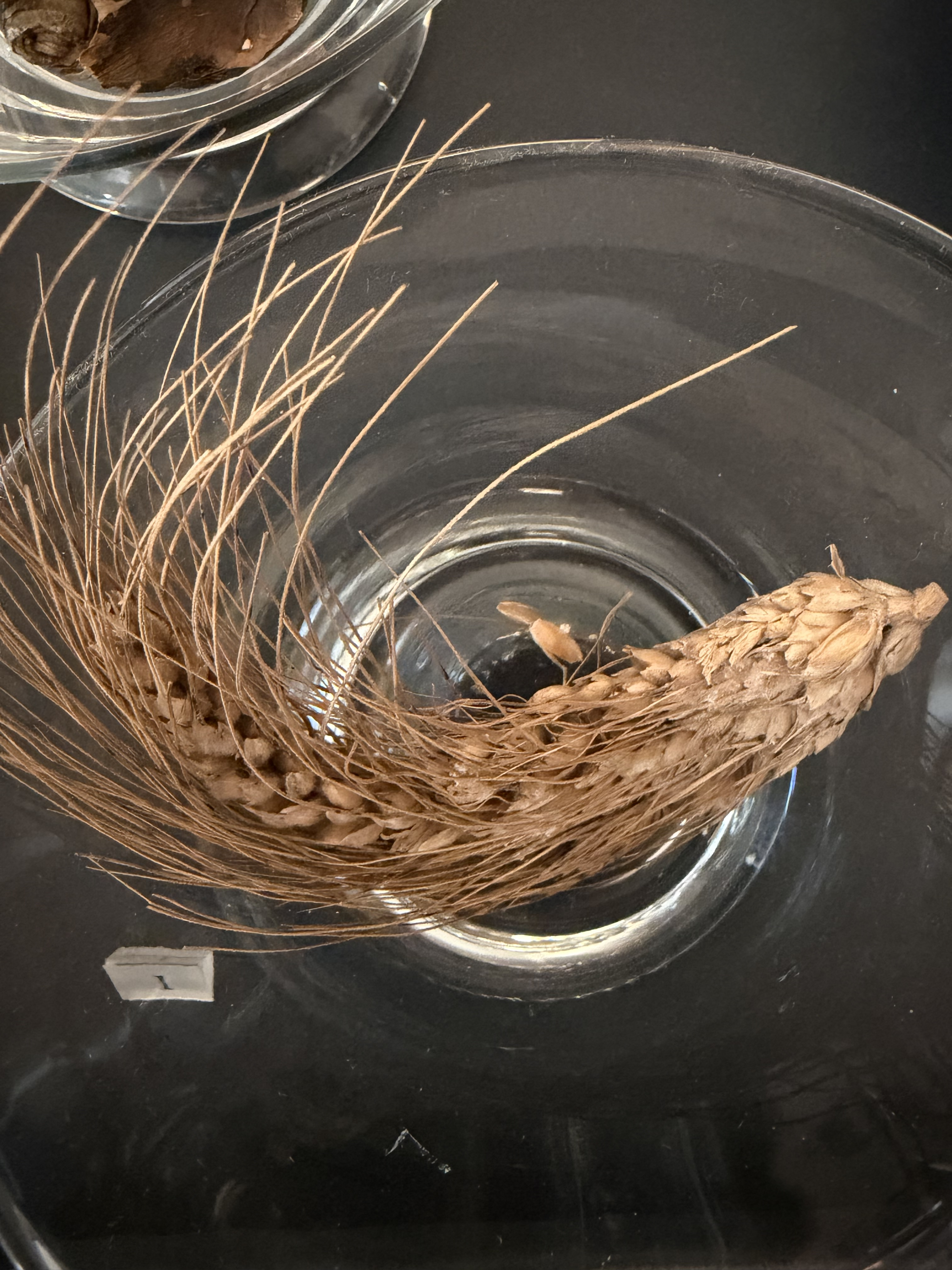
Ancient ear of emmer, Egypt, 2000-1500 BCE. At the Louvre.

== Production and consumption ==
=== 19th century ===
Wheat prices in England, 1264–1996

Wheat became a central agriculture endeavor in the worldwide British Empire in the 19th century, and remains of great importance in Australia, Canada and India. In Australia, with vast lands and a limited work force, expanded production depended on technological advances, especially irrigation and machinery. By the 1840s there were 900 growers in South Australia. They used "Ridley's Stripper", a reaper-harvester perfected by John Ridley in 1843, to remove the heads of grain. In Canada, modern farm implements made large scale wheat farming possible from the late 1840s. By 1879, Saskatchewan was the center, followed by Alberta, Manitoba and Ontario, as the spread of railway lines allowed easy exports to Britain. By 1910, wheat made up 22% of Canada's exports, rising to 25% in 1930 despite the sharp decline in prices during the Great Depression. Efforts to expand wheat production in South Africa, Kenya and India were stymied by low yields and disease. However, by 2000 India had become the second largest producer of wheat in the world. In the 19th century the American wheat frontier moved rapidly westward. By the 1880s 70% of American exports went to British ports. The first successful grain elevator was built in Buffalo in 1842. The cost of transport fell rapidly. In 1869 it cost 37 cents to transport a bushel of wheat from Chicago to Liverpool; in 1905 it was 10 cents.

==== In the United States ====
In 1830, it took four people and two oxen, working 10 hours a day, to produce 200 bushels. The geographic center of wheat-growing areas in the U.S. in 1839 was to the north and west of Washington, D.C., and it spread further over time to the far west of the country. Production conditions also resulted in extending the wheat growing areas into harsher climatic regions. Data on wheat production is available for the period between 1885 and 1930. Improvements in wheat breeding in the U.S. were an activity of the state agricultural experiment stations, while the federal officials concentrated on exploring possibilities of gaining from appropriate varieties developed in other parts of the world.

After the American Civil War, the western Mississippi Valley and the Great Plains to its west, where large fertile lands were available, resulted in expanding wheat farming. By this time, better tillage equipment was in use, railroads provided better access to world markets, better trading and warehousing facilities were facilitated, and more particularly introduction of hard winter wheat. In the 1870s, Turkey red wheat, a hard variety of wheat, was introduced to the farmlands of Kansas by Russian Mennonite immigrants. This wheat variety spread quickly. New technology substantially enhanced productivity in the 19th century, as sowing with drills replaced broadcasting, cradles took the place of sickles, and the cradles in turn were replaced by reapers and binders. Steam-powered threshing machines superseded flails. By 1895, in Bonanza farms in the Dakotas, it took six different people and 36 horses pulling huge harvesters, working 10 hours a day, to produce 20,000 bushels. Following the invention of the steel roller mill in 1878, hard varieties of wheat such as Turkey Red became more popular than soft, which had been previously preferred because they were easier for grist mills to grind.

=== 20th century ===
In the 20th century, global wheat output expanded about 5-fold, but until about 1955 most of this reflected increases in wheat crop area, with lesser (about 20%) increases in yield per unit area. After 1955 however, there was a ten-fold increase in the rate of wheat yield improvement per year, and this allowed global wheat production to increase. Thus technological innovation and scientific crop management with synthetic nitrogen fertilizer, irrigation and wheat breeding were the main drivers of wheat output growth in the second half of the century. There were some significant decreases in wheat crop area, for instance in North America. Better seed storage and germination ability (and hence a smaller requirement to retain harvested crop for next year's seed) is another 20th-century technological innovation. In medieval England, farmers saved one-quarter of their wheat harvest as seed for the next crop, leaving only three-quarters for food and feed consumption. By 1999, the global average seed use of wheat was about 6% of output.

==== In the United States ====
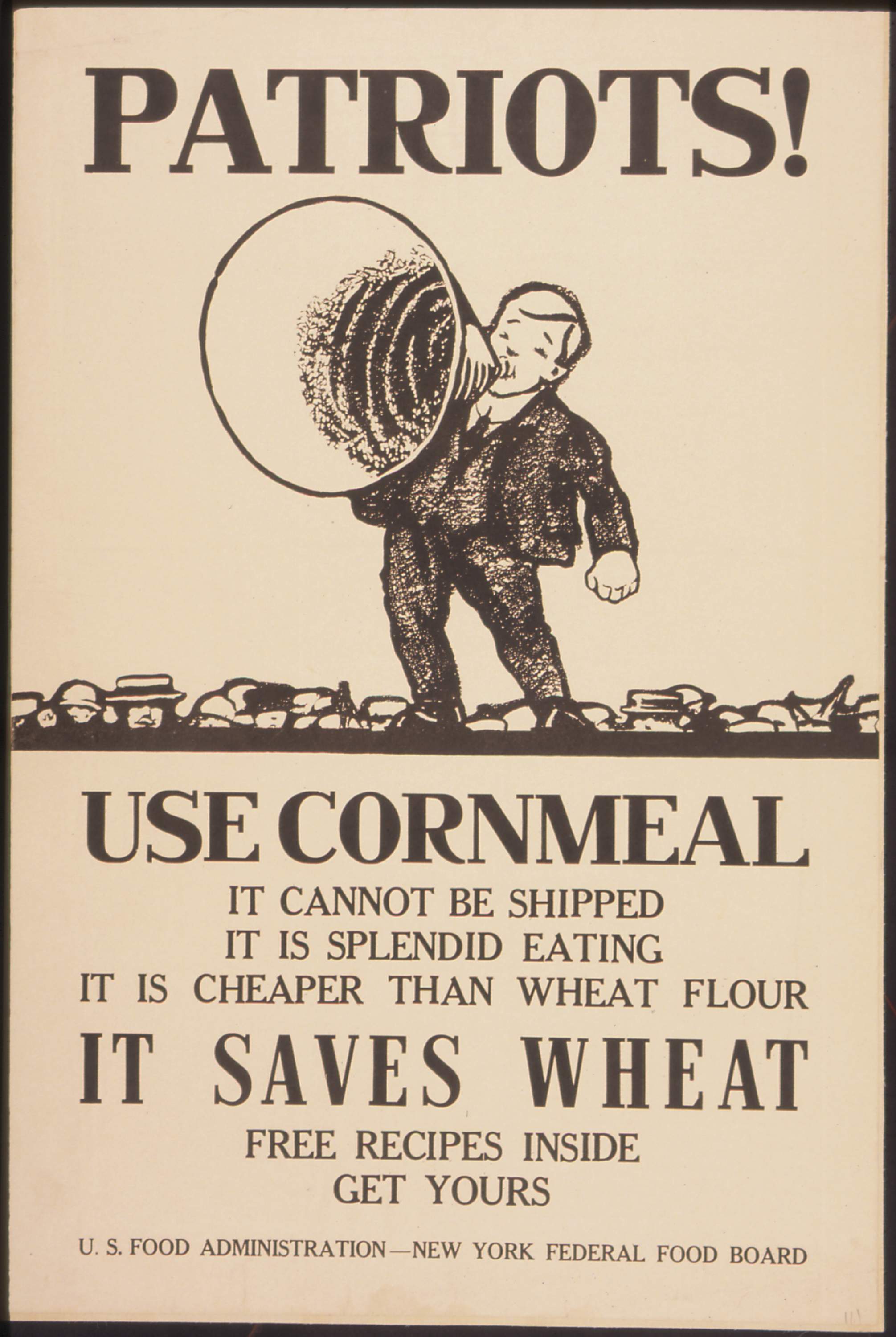
U.S. Food Administration poster during World War I encouraging Americans to use cornmeal, instead of wheat flour: "Patriots Use Corn Meal. It Cannot Be Shipped. It is Splendid Eating. It is Cheaper Than Wheat Flour."

Exports from 1914 to 1922 amounted to more than 200 million bushels. The annual wheat production of the United States more than tripled in the fifty years between 1871 and 1921; it increased from about 250 million bushels in 1869–1871 to over 750 million in 1919–1921. With recorded wheat production of more than its domestic consumption (production was as much as 2.5 times the consumption), as World War II started, wheat stocks could not be lifted and the result was its use as livestock feed and for industrial alcohol. After the war years, there were four "best" years (1945–1948) when the average annual production peaked at 1,228 million bushels, double the production of the war years.

==== In Canada ====
Wheat is a staple crop from Canada. To help homesteaders attain an abundant harvest in a foreshortened growing season, varieties of wheat were developed at the beginning of the 20th century. Red Fife was the first strain; it was a wheat which could be seeded in the fall and sprout in the early spring. Red Fife ripened nearly two weeks sooner and was a harder wheat than other spring wheats. Dr. C. Saunders experimented further with Red Fife, and developed Marquis Wheat, which was resistant to rust and came to maturity within 100 days. Some other types of wheat grown are durum, spelt, and winter wheat. In recent years, Canadian farmers have also begun to grow rice.

The Prairie Farm Rehabilitation Administration (PFRA) was established in 1935 to provide Federal financial assistance in regard to the global economical crisis. The PFRA provides farmers with land and water resources such as irrigation, soil drifting conservation and small farm water development. The Farm credit program has established the Canadian Farm Loan Act to provide stock bonds and farm improvement loans.

==== In Bangladesh ====
Wheat is the second largest food grain of Bangladesh. While historically not a major crop in the country, domestic wheat production hit a record high of 1.5 million tonnes in 1985, representing some 7 to 9 percent of total food grain production. Since then, wheat production in Bangladesh has remained stagnant, with annual production of about 1 million tonnes, falling significantly short of the demand of 7 million tonnes. The shortfall is met through imports, which have exceeded 6 million tonnes, amounting to $1.4–$2 billion in imports annually. Wheat constitutes the majority of the country's food grain imports. About half of Bangladesh's home-grown wheat is irrigated.

=== 21st century ===
In the 21st century, global warming is reducing wheat yield in some places. War and tariffs have disrupted trade. Between 2007 and 2009, concern was raised that wheat production would peak, in the same manner as oil, possibly causing sustained price rises. However, at that time global per capita food production had been increasing steadily for decades.

=== Farming techniques ===
Technological advances in soil preparation and seed placement at planting time, use of crop rotation and fertilizers to improve plant growth, and advances in harvesting have combined to promote wheat as a viable crop. When the use of seed drills replaced broadcasting sowing of seed in the 18th century, productivity increased.. Yields per unit area increased as crop rotations were applied to land that had long been in cultivation, and the use of fertilizers became widespread.

Improved husbandry has more recently included pervasive automation, starting with the use of threshing machines, and progressing to large and costly machines like the combine harvester which greatly increased productivity. At the same time, better varieties such as Norin 10 wheat, developed in Japan in the 1930s, or the dwarf wheat developed by Norman Borlaug in the Green Revolution, greatly increased yields.
