= Fukui cave =

Cave in south-western Japan, paleolithic site

Fukui Cave
- 福井洞窟 (Japanese)
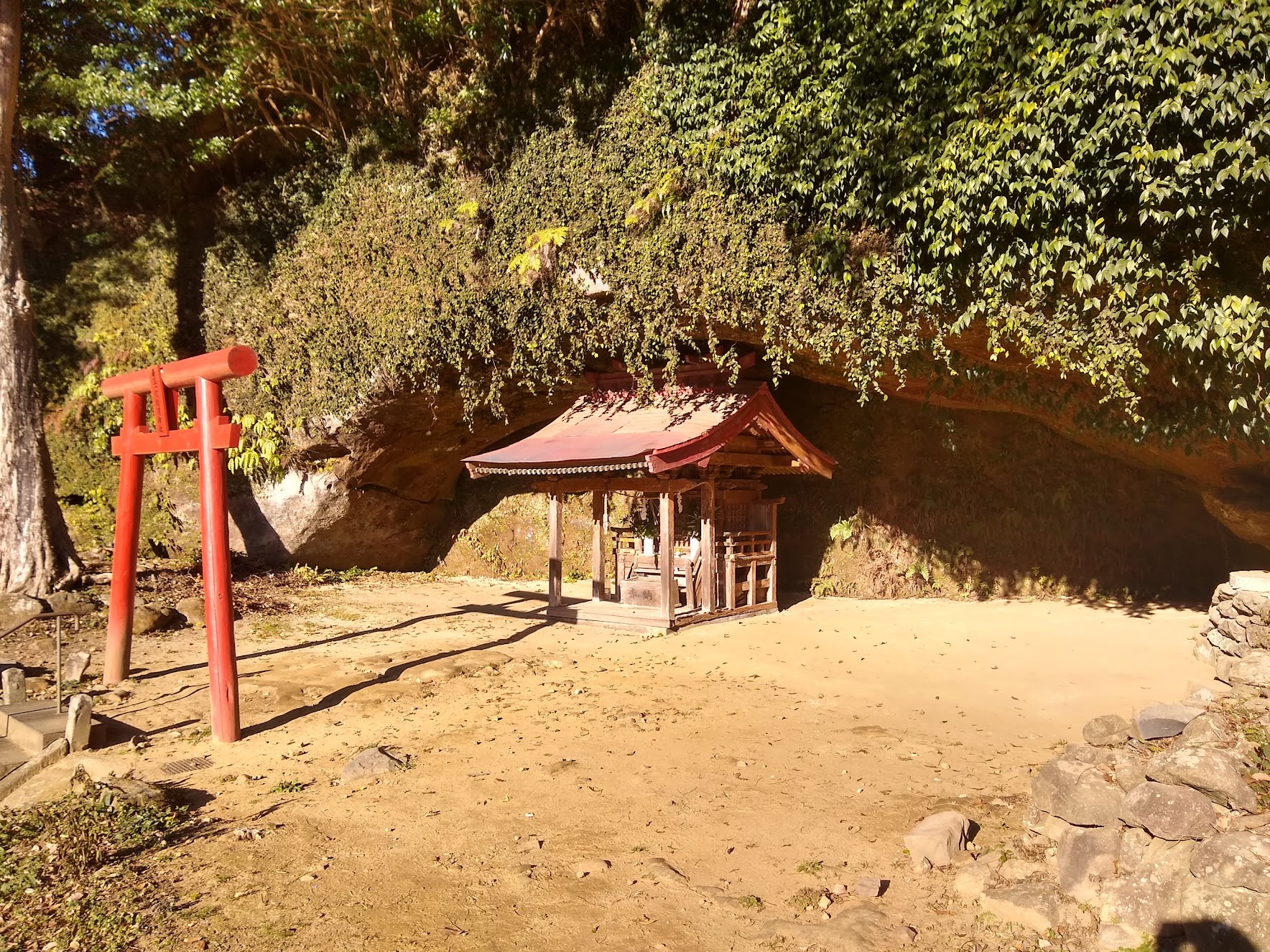
- Fukui Cave

- Fukui Cave Fukui cave (Japan)
- 33°17′32.8″N 129°41′49.2″E
- Type: settlement
- Periods: Japanese Paleolithic to Jōmon
- Location: Sasebo, Nagasaki, Japan
- Region: Kyushu

Site notes
- Public access: Yes
- National Historic Site of Japan

The Fukui Cave (福井洞窟, Fukui dōkutsu) is an archaeological site consisting of a Japanese Paleolithic period to the early incipient Jōmon period cave dwelling in the Yoshii neighborhood of the city of Sasebo, Nagasaki Prefecture on the island of Kyushu, Japan. The site was designated a National Historic Site of Japan in 1978. Humans have been occupying the site since at least 30,000 years ago Pottery discovered at this site dates back to around 12,700 years ago and are among the oldest found in the world. In June 2024 a government panel recommended the site be designated as what would be one of just 64 special historic sites in Japan.

== Overview ==
The Fukui Cave is located in the grounds of an Inari shrine on the left bank of the Fukui River, a tributary of the Saza River. The cave is 16 meters wide, 6 meters deep, and 3 meters high, and opens up in the shade of a huge protruding rock. The steep cliffs of the cave are made of sandstone, and in the surrounding area is found volcanic basalt from the late Miocene era. Landslides over the years have changed the flow of the Fukui river, forming the present shape of the caves. From the topsoil to the lowest bedrock, there are 15 sedimentary layers at a depth of about 5.5 meters, and stratigraphic examination indicates that there are seven cultural layers.

== Discovery and excavation ==
The Shinto shrine was constructed in 1936, during which time the soil was dug about one meter deep. Local historian Junichi Matsuse sifted through the soil finding Jōmon pottery and arrowheads. An archaeological excavation was conducted by a team of archeologists from the Japanese Archaeological Association in 1964 revealing significant neolithic artifacts. Stone arrowheads and mold-patterned pottery from the early Jōmon period were discovered in the first surface layer, while claw-patterned pottery, ridge-patterned pottery, and microblades from the early pottery period were excavated in the second and third layers. The relationship between the claw-patterned pottery in layer 2 and the ridge-patterned pottery in layer 3 revealed that the pottery from the early period was followed by the claw-patterned pottery. In addition, the microblades excavated at the same time were found in the older layer 4 in the same form, and since layer 4 is a layer of stone tools without pottery, it can be inferred that Paleolithic people who made and used microblades began making pottery. Furthermore, layer 7 contained a group of stone tools that were slightly larger than the microblades excavated in layer 4 and could be called small stone blades, which are noteworthy as they are considered to be a precursor to the creation of microblades. The material of the stone tools also changed at the boundary between layer 7 and layer 7, with sanukite being used above layer 7 but obsidian being the main material, whereas in layers below layer 7, no obsidian was found at all and only stone tools made of sanukite were found. Sanukite lithic cores and wing-shaped fragments were excavated in the 9th layer, showing that chipped stone tools were actively made from sanukite. A large stone tool with double-sided processing, thought to be one of the oldest stone tools known in Kyushu, was excavated from the lowest layer, the 15th layer.

From February 2011 to 2016 the cave was re-excavated by digging a 6 meter trench and analyzed using recent technology. New discoveries included identification of animal and plant remains, hearths, as well as using photogrammetry to identify stratigraphy helping to understand formation of the cave. During Paleolithic times, the cave was surrounded by temperate forests with ample amounts of chestnuts, walnuts and acorns.

The site is about a seven-minute drive from Senryugataki Station on the Matsuura Railway Nishi-Kyushu Line. It is open to the public and there is a museum on site. All excavated items from the cave were collectively designated National Important Cultural Properties in 2020.

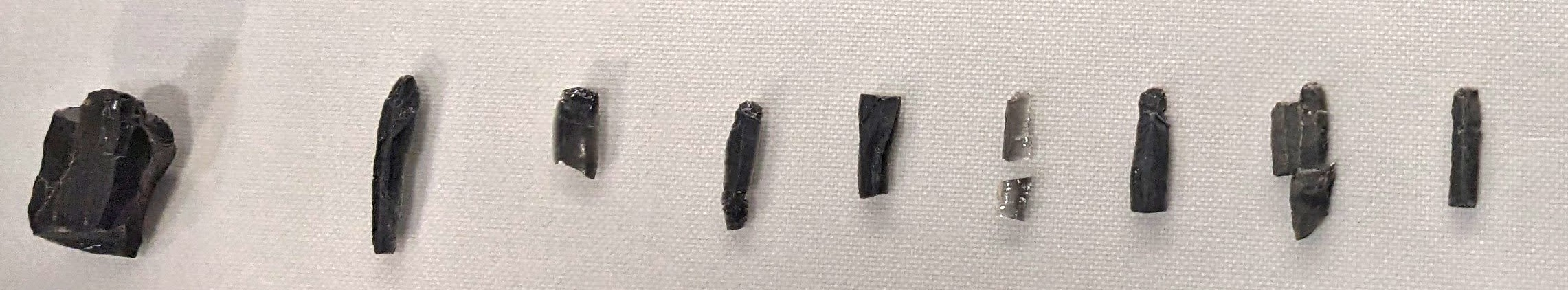
19,000 year old microblades found in layer 13

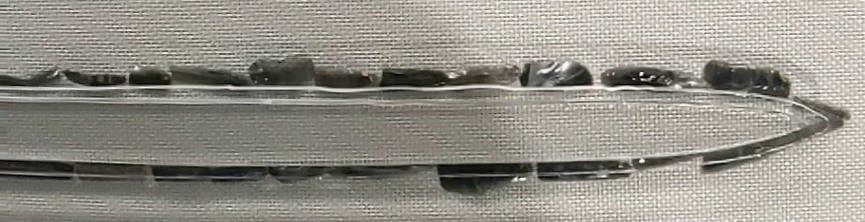
16,000-14,000 year old microblades found in layer 2-3

The six-meter trench consisted of 15 layers that covered the time periods from 10,000 to 19,000 years ago. 70,000 artifacts have been recovered, mostly microblades, but also a hearth, stone paving, wild boar teeth, and pottery. Clear signs of human occupation of the cave are found around 18,000-19,000 years ago in layer 12 and 13. Around 17,500 years ago, a landslide near the cave triggered the fall of the cave ceiling and sand and dirt buildup within the cave ceiling.

Numerous microblades have been found between 14,000 and 16,000 in layer 2 and 3 along with the first signs of pottery. The cave is believed to be the location of a 16th-century shrine that formed part of the boundary of the nearby Naoya castle, which is the predecessor of the current shrine. Layers 5 and 6 are sterile, but layer 7 and below contain additional microblades, created using a different manufacture technique from previous layers.

== Significance ==
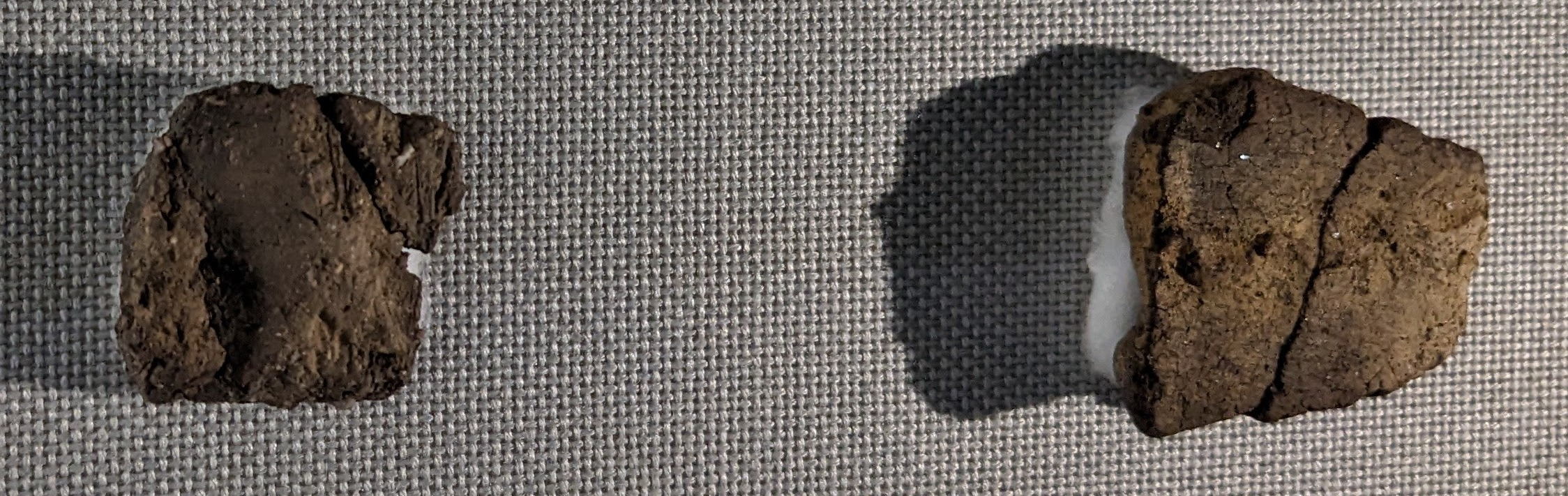
Pottery on the left was found by CT scan to have fibers kneaded into the clay

Fukui cave and the nearby Senpukuji Cave offer excellent examples of ceramic development in Japan among the Jōmon people. Carbon 14 dating on pottery has shown it to be about 12,700 years old. Pottery remnants found were critical in confirming the transition from the pottery having slender clay ridges to that having fingernail-like impressions. The earliest examples found at the cave were not cord-marked pottery, but decorated with appliqué of dots or strips of clay. Pottery examined by CT scan found fibers from a species of fern kneaded into the clay. One clay disc and two sandstone discs with a hole in the center whose use is unknown were also discovered, a rare find in prehistory.

There is evidence of an association between microblade technology and the development of pottery.

== Galleries ==
Views of the three Fukui Cave rock shelters
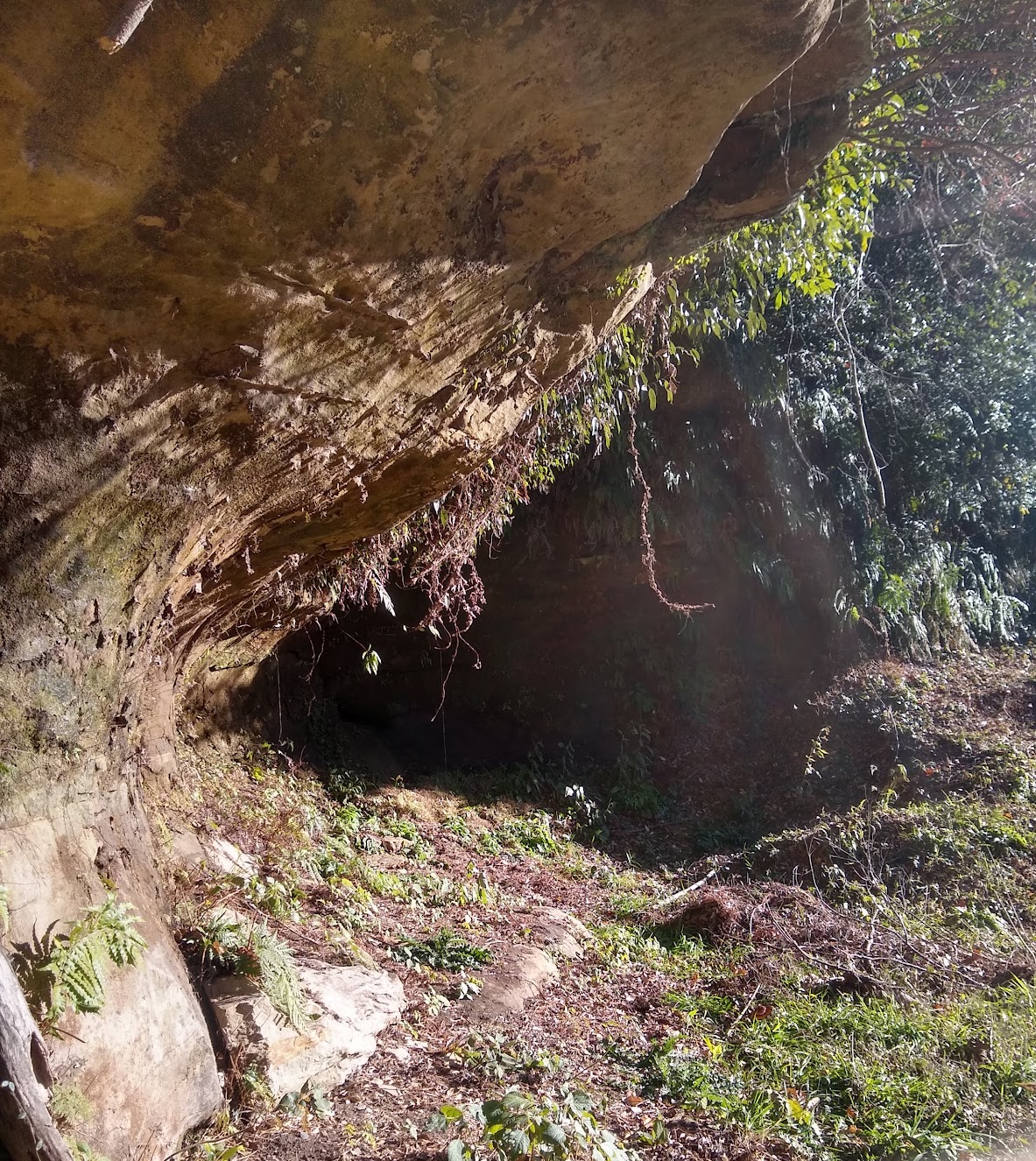
East rock shelter

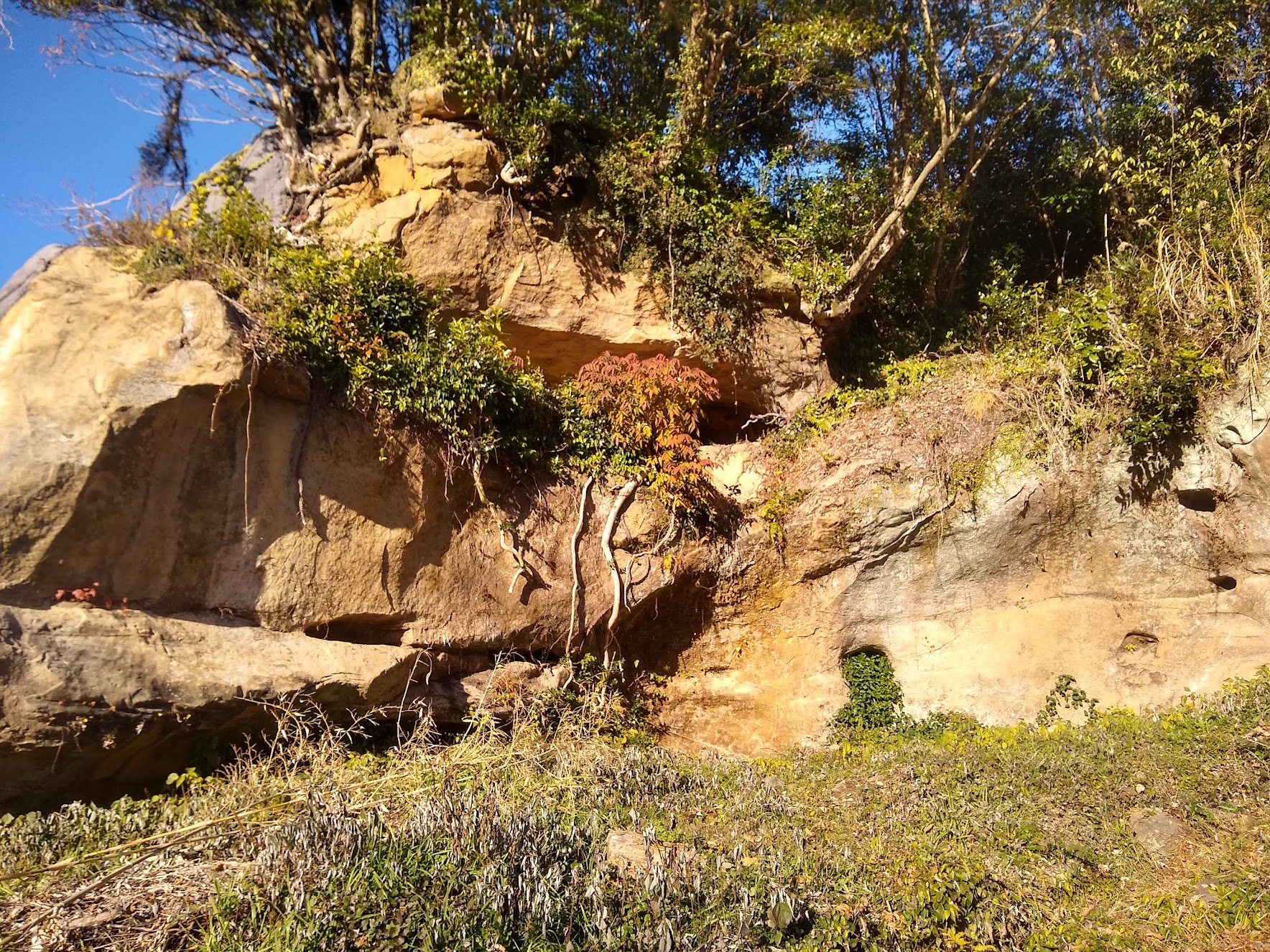
West rock shelter

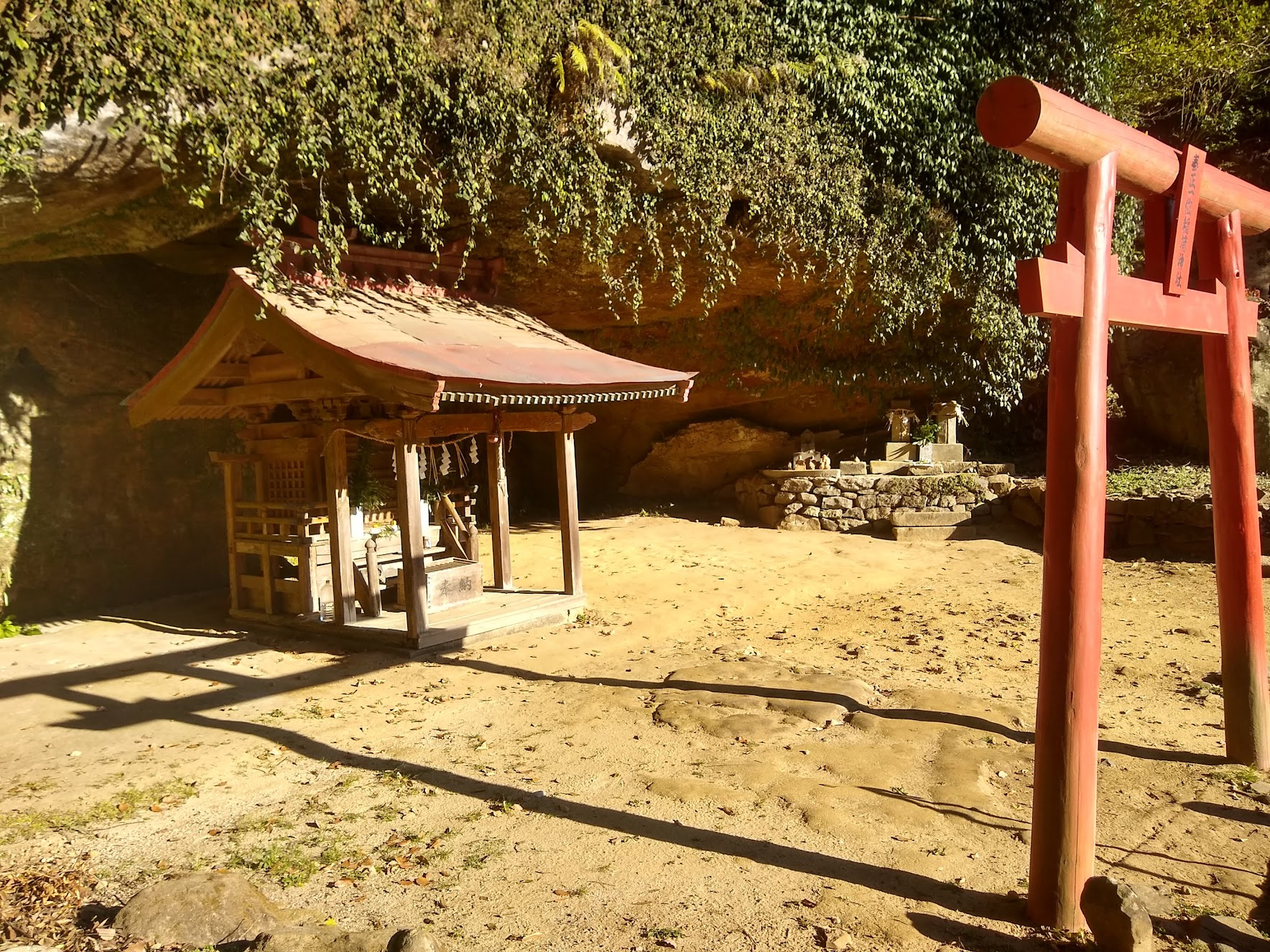
Center rock shelter as viewed looking east
Stone tool artifacts found at Fukui cave
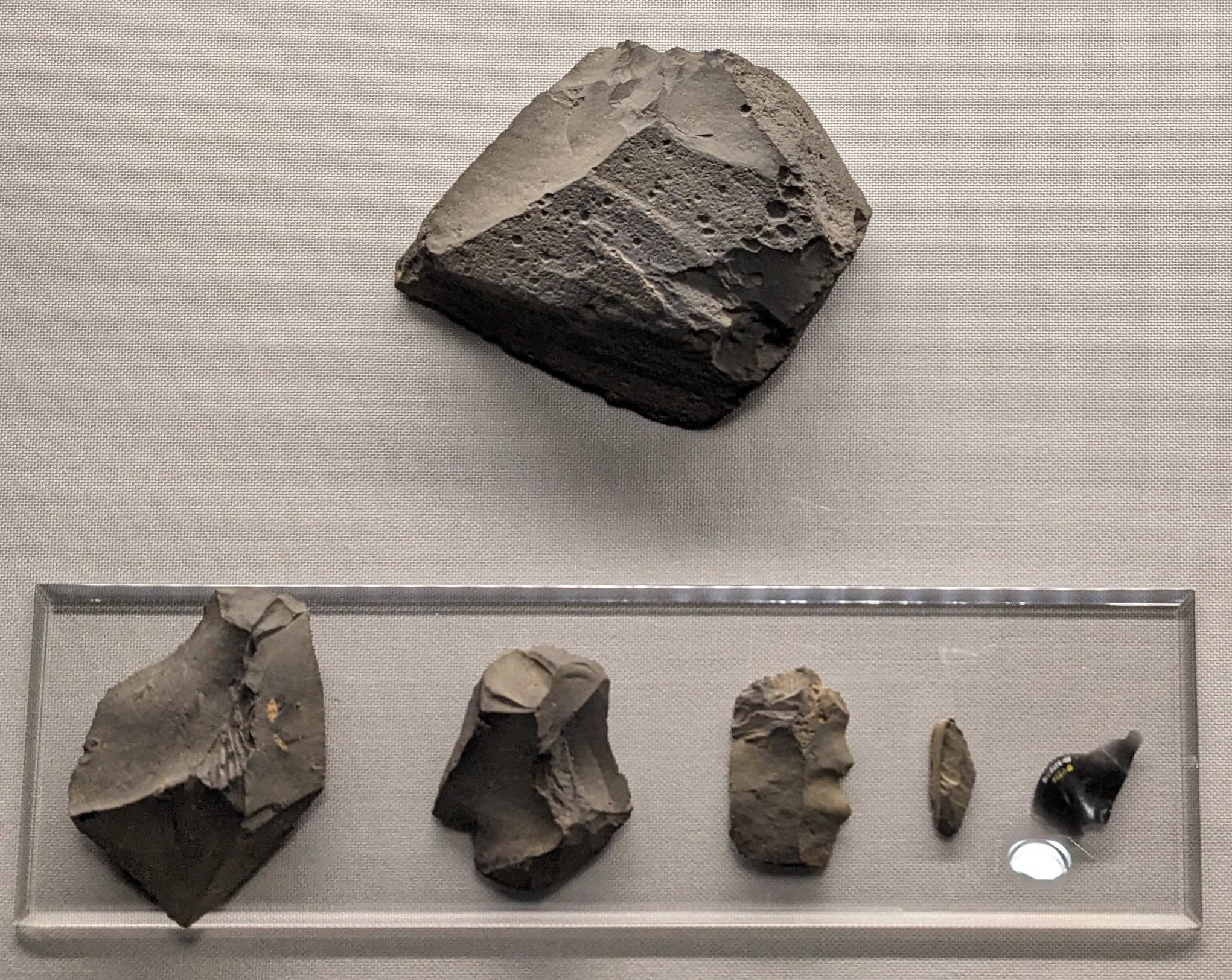
Artifacts from 19000 years ago found in layer 14-15

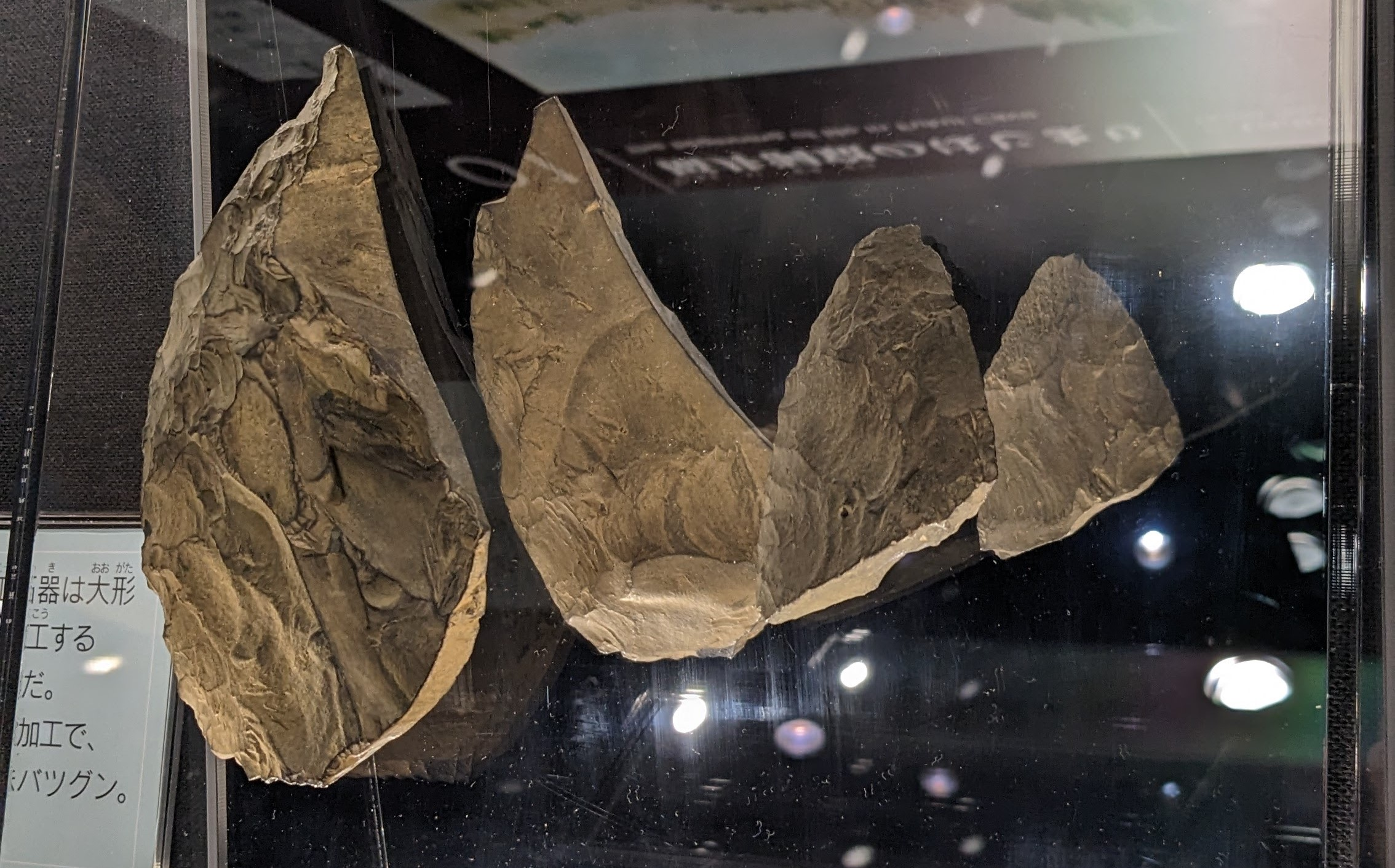
Artifacts from 40000-19000 years ago in layer 15

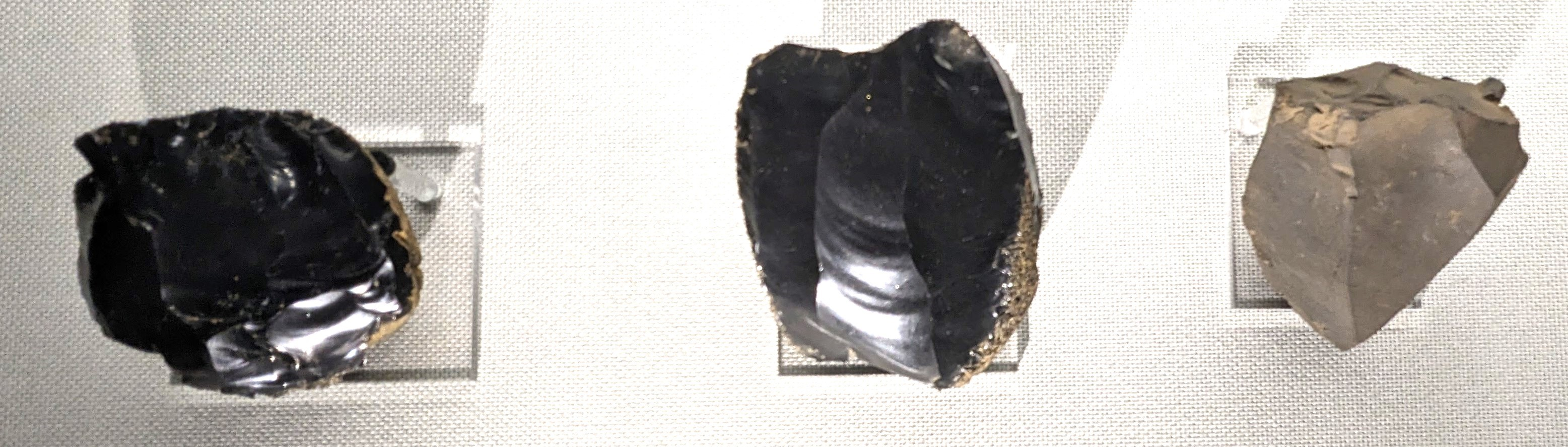
Stone tools circa 30000-20000 years ago

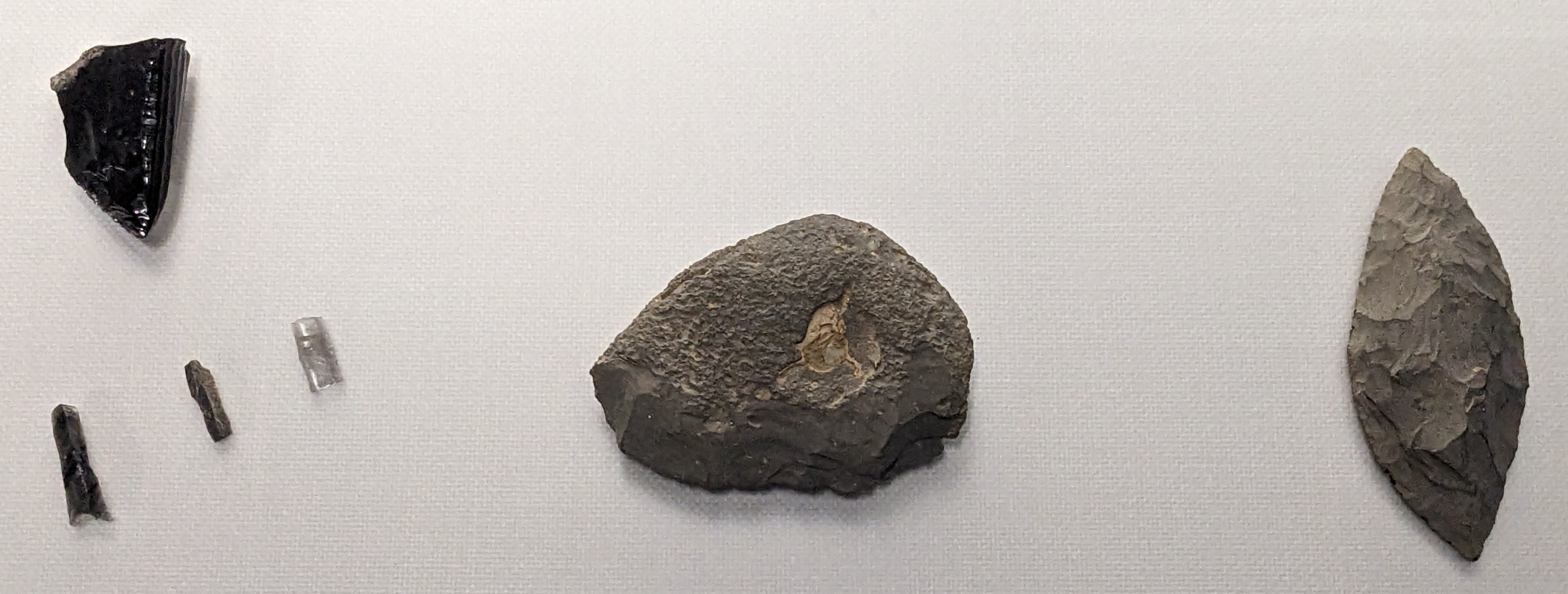
Tools from 16,000-15,300 years ago
Pottery fragments found at Fukui cave
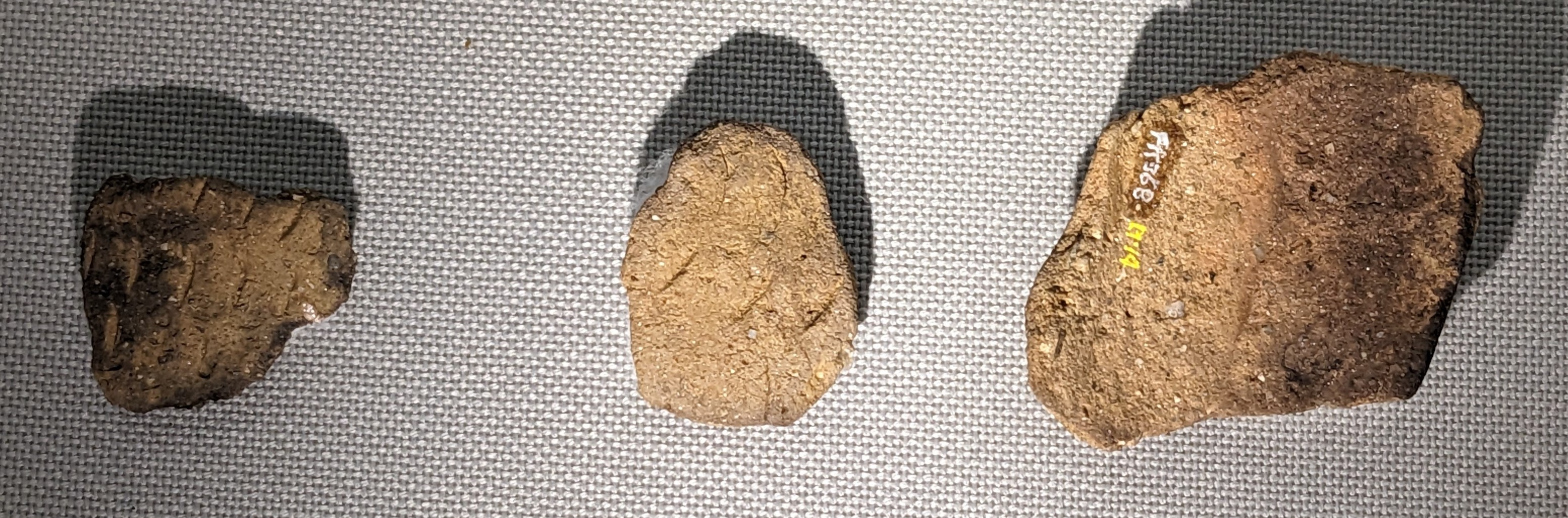
Pottery fragments discovered in layer 2

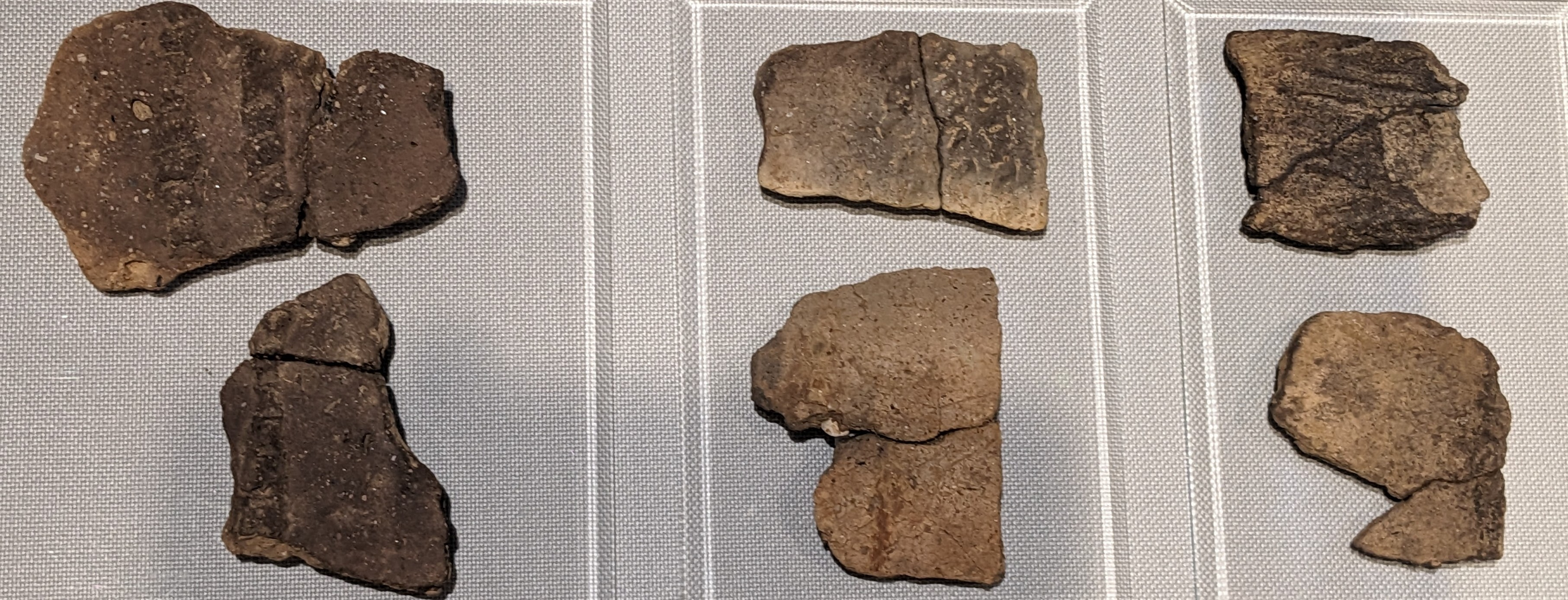
Pottery fragments discovered in layer 2-3

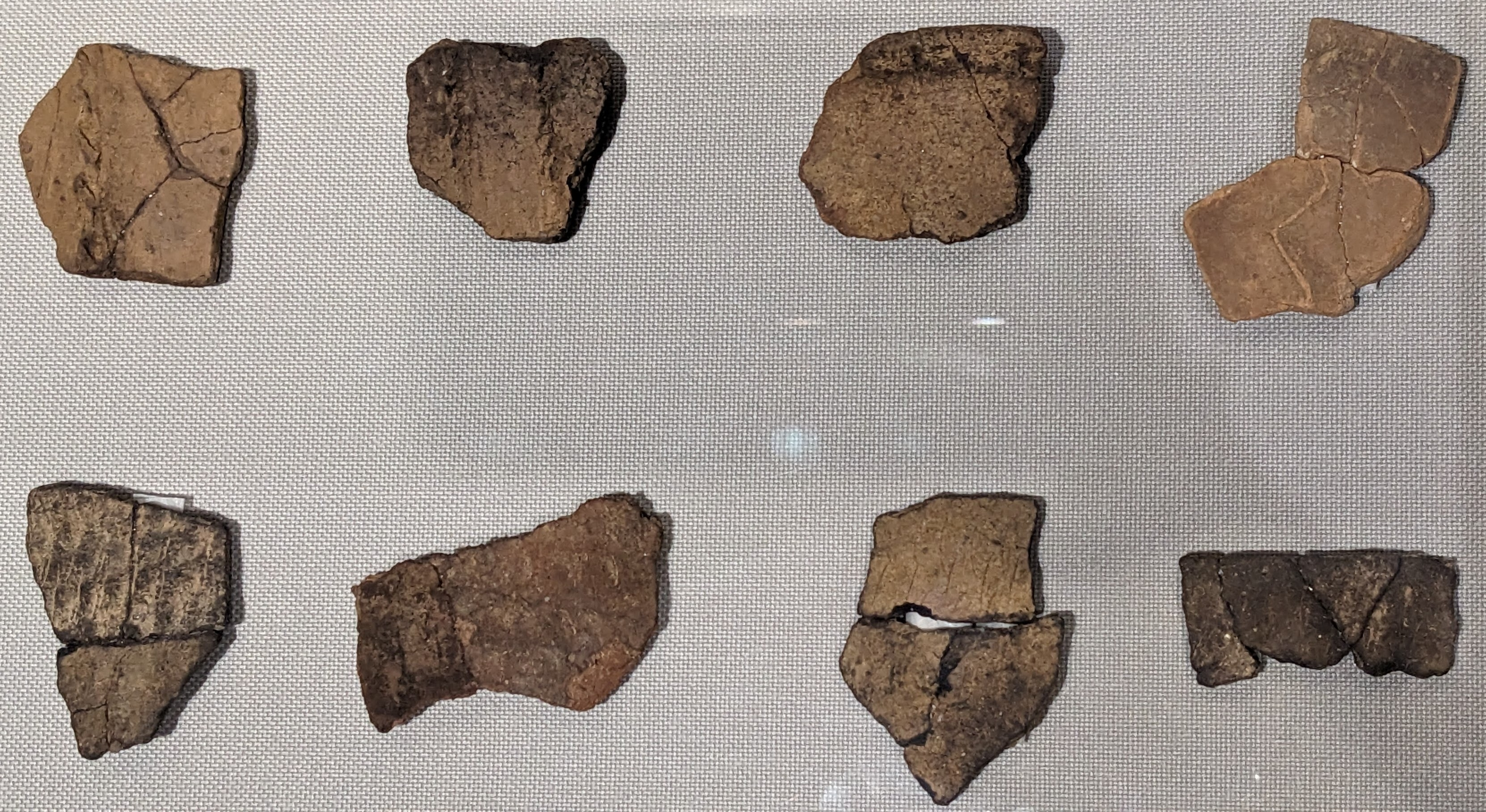
Pottery fragments found at layer 2-3

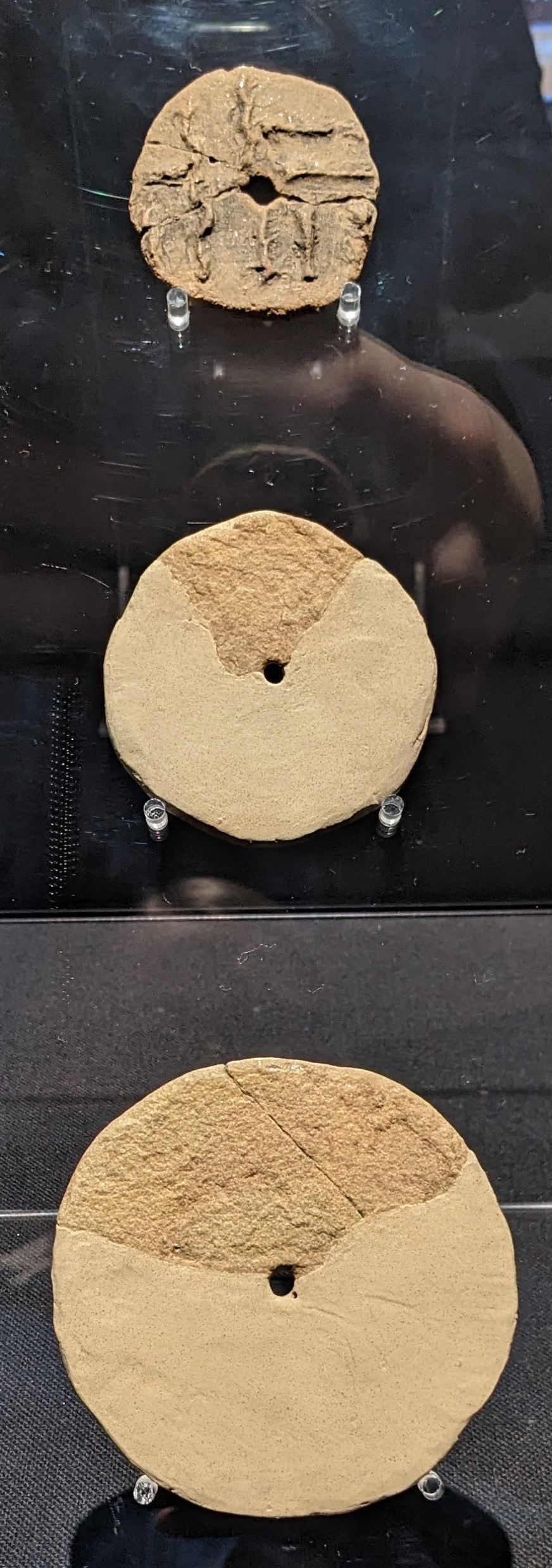
One clay and two sandstone discs found in layer 2-3

== See also ==
- List of Historic Sites of Japan (Nagasaki)
