= Microblade technology =

Period of technological development

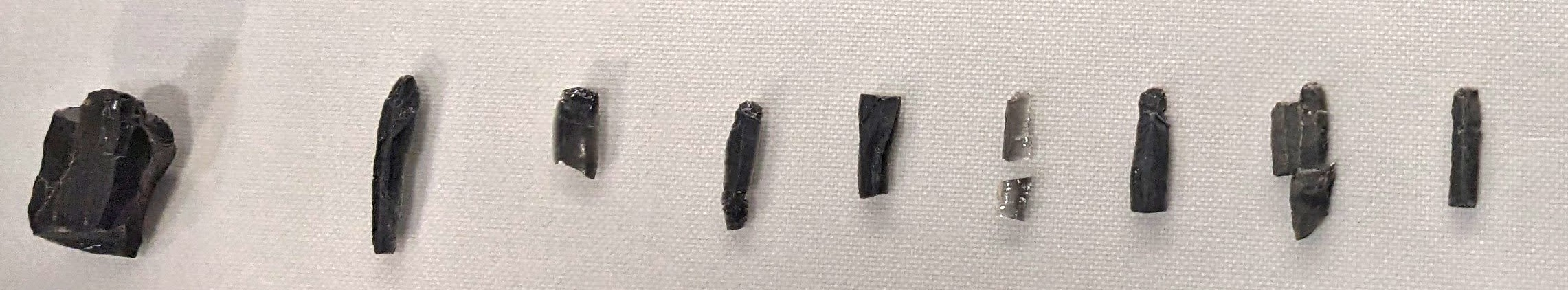
19000 year old microblades found at Fukui cave in Japan.

Microblade technology is a period of technological microlith development marked by the creation and use of small stone blades, which are produced by chipping silica-rich stones like chert, quartz, or obsidian. Blades are a specialized type of lithic flake that are at least twice as long as they are wide. An alternate method of defining blades focuses on production features, including parallel lateral edges and dorsal scars, a lack of cortex, a prepared platform with a broad angle, and a proximal bulb of percussion. Microblades are generally less than 50 mm long in their finished state.

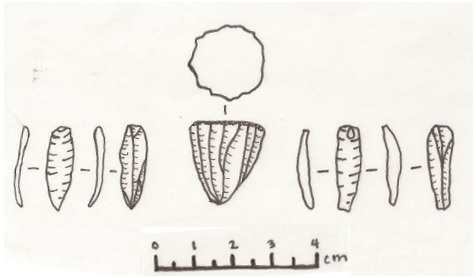
Here is an example of two microblades and a microblade core.

== History ==
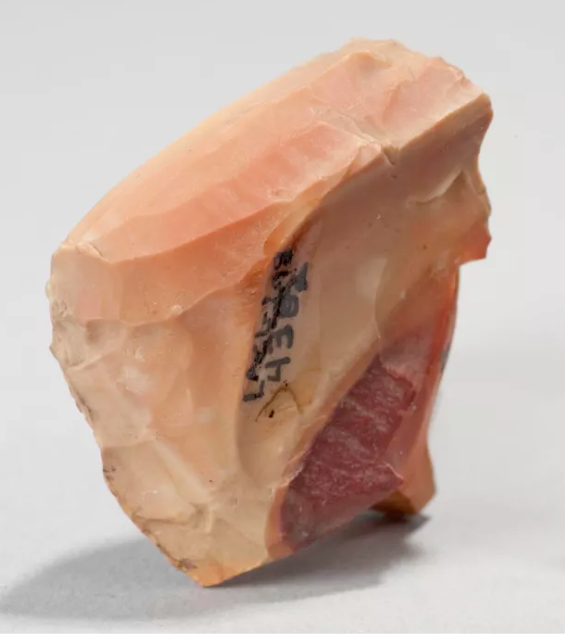
A piece of chert used to make microblades, found in Lake Clark National Park, Alaska.

The geographic origin of microblades is poorly understood, with differing theories posing origins in Southern Siberia, Northern China, or the PHSK (Paleo-Hokkaido-Sakhalin-Kurile) peninsula, with dates ranging from over 30,000 BP to as little as 18,000 BP. The microblade technology has been associated with the Ancient Paleo-Siberians. Because microblade technology is economical (using less raw material than other technologies), relatively easy to make, and extremely portable, it came into widespread use over vast parts of northern Asia and northeastern Siberia during and after the Ice Age. Microblade technology was very efficient for hunting because it used light, barbed spears. During the Ice Age, hunter-gatherers suffered from shortage of food resources, so they had to move more frequently. Microblade is suitable for high mobility and rapid weapon production, as well as reducing failure of hunting and lost or damaged weapons. In other words, in the resource-limited environment of the Last Glacial Maximum, hunter-gatherers invested more time acquiring better raw materials and developing the technique of lithic manufacture. Barbed tips opened wounds and the resulting blood loss killed prey faster and with less loss of hunting equipment than traditional spears.

These changes in lithic technology appear to have been adaptations to reduced resource availability due to climate changes during the Last Glacial Maximum and Younger Dryas allowing for more efficient sustenance strategies. An important site for learning more about the diverse adaptations of the microblade is Shuidonggou Locality 12 (SDG12). It was at this site that microblades were found along with diverse artifacts: needles, awls, and a bone knife handle. This handle is a big indicator that microblades were used for multiple purposes, and no longer were exclusive to hunting. In at least one site in Northern China, microblades are also found in context with heat shattered and burned stone, usually evidence for stone-boiling practices, another resource intensification strategy aimed at recovering more nutrients from food resources via cooking.

The first Native Americans brought this technology with them across the Bering Land Bridge to North America. At least six independent Native American groups used microblade technology, including the Poverty Point/Jaketown, Hopewell culture, Tikal Maya, and Northwest Coast peoples. Specialized craftspeople manufactured millions of microblades in the Mississippian chiefdom of Cahokia, in Illinois, as did Chumash (tribe) craftspeople in California's Northern Channel Islands. In both of these cases, microblades were sharpened to a point and attached to the end of sticks, creating microdrills. These microdrills were used to drill holes in marine shells to create beads. Shell beads were used as money among the Chumash, and as a result microblades were a vital part of the Chumash economy.

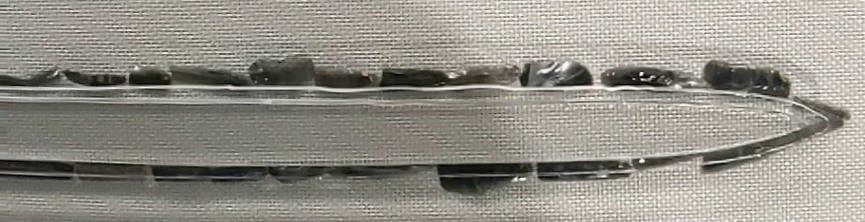
16,000-14,000 year old microblades found at Fukui cave in Japan, arranged as they would on a spear tip.

== See also ==
- Microlith
- Microburin

== Bibliography ==
- Elston, Robert G.; Kuhn, Steven L., eds. (2002). Thinking Small: Global Perspectives on Microlithization. Archeological Papers of the American Anthropological Association. Arlington, Va.: American Anthropological Association. ISBN 978-1-93130-309-5. OCLC 53027555.
- Kuzmin, Yaroslav V.; Keates, Susan G.; Shen, Chen, eds. (2007). Origin and Spread of Microblade Technology in Northern Asia and North America. Burnaby, B.C.: Simon Fraser University / Archeology Press. ISBN 978-0-86491-294-7. OCLC 965122987.
