= Sasebo =

Sasebo 佐世保市
- Core city
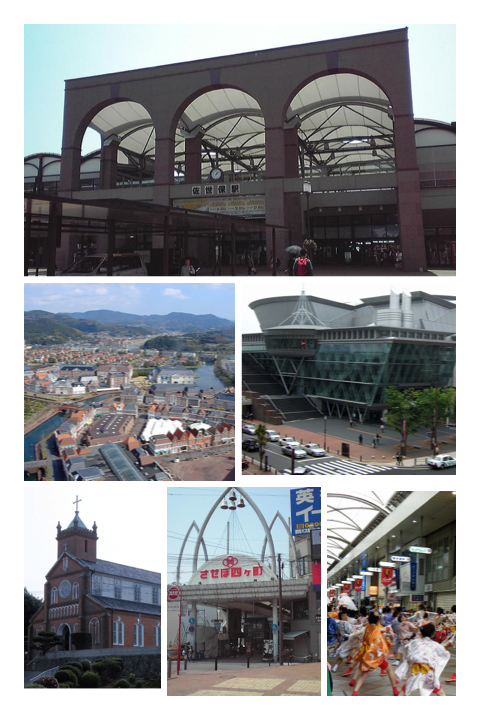
- Sasebo Station, Huis Ten Bosch, Arkas Sasebo, Kuroshima Church, Sasebo Yonkacho, Yosakoi Sasebo Matsuri

- Flag Seal

- Location of Sasebo in Nagasaki Prefecture

- Location in Japan
- Coordinates: 33°10′48″N 129°42′54″E
- Country: Japan
- Region: Kyushu
- Prefecture: Nagasaki

Government
  - Mayor: Daisuke Miyajima (since April 2023)

Area
  - Total: 426.01 km^{2} (164.48 sq mi)

Population (April 1, 2024)
  - Total: 230,873
  - Density: 541.94/km^{2} (1,403.6/sq mi)
- Time zone: UTC+09:00 (JST)
- City hall address: 1–10 Hachiman, Sasebo-shi, Nagasaki-ken 857-8585
- Climate: Cfa
- Website: Official website
- Symbols
- Flower: Lilium speciosum
- Tree: Flowering Dogwood

Sasebo (佐世保市, Sasebo-shi) is a core city located in Nagasaki Prefecture, Japan. It is the second-largest city in Nagasaki Prefecture, after its capital, Nagasaki. As of 1 April 2024, the city had an estimated population of 230,873 in 102,670 households, and a population density of 540 persons per km^{2}. The total area of the city is 426.01 km^{2} (164.48 sq mi).

== Geography ==
Sasebo is located in the northwestern part of Kyushu, in the northern part of Nagasaki Prefecture, from the base of the Kitamatsuura Peninsula to the central and southern part of the peninsula. It is located about 50 kilometers north-northwest of Nagasaki City (the shortest distance by land is about 60 kilometers). The west, southwest, and southern parts of the city face the sea, and the east borders Saga Prefecture. The city includes the island of Ukujima, at the northern end of the Goto Islands. Although not as steep as Nagasaki City, the city is characterized by many hills. Because the mountains approach the central downtown area in the center of the city, bicycles are not widely used. Parts of the city are within the borders of the Saikai National Park.

=== Neighboring municipalities ===
Nagasaki Prefecture

- Hasami
- Hirado
- Kawatana
- Matsuura
- Ojika
- Saikai
- Saza

Saga Prefecture

- Arita
- Imari

=== Climate ===
The climate is similar to that of Norfolk, Virginia, which also has major US naval facilities. Rainy season lasts from early June to mid-July, and the summer is hot and humid. During the winter, there may be light snowfall and some freezing.

According to the Japan Meteorological Agency (JMA), Sasebo has a humid subtropical climate (Köppen climate classification Cfa) with hot summers and cool winters. Precipitation is significant throughout the year, but is somewhat lower in winter.

Climate data for Sasebo (1991–2020 normals, extremes 1946–present
| Month | Jan | Feb | Mar | Apr | May | Jun | Jul | Aug | Sep | Oct | Nov | Dec | Year |
|---|---|---|---|---|---|---|---|---|---|---|---|---|---|
| Record high °C (°F) | 20.3 (68.5) | 22.4 (72.3) | 24.8 (76.6) | 28.4 (83.1) | 31.7 (89.1) | 36.2 (97.2) | 37.6 (99.7) | 39.1 (102.4) | 37.5 (99.5) | 33.0 (91.4) | 27.9 (82.2) | 23.9 (75.0) | 39.1 (102.4) |
| Mean maximum °C (°F) | 16.3 (61.3) | 18.2 (64.8) | 21.2 (70.2) | 25.0 (77.0) | 28.8 (83.8) | 30.6 (87.1) | 34.4 (93.9) | 35.4 (95.7) | 33.0 (91.4) | 29.0 (84.2) | 23.8 (74.8) | 18.7 (65.7) | 35.7 (96.3) |
| Mean daily maximum °C (°F) | 10.5 (50.9) | 11.7 (53.1) | 15.1 (59.2) | 19.6 (67.3) | 23.8 (74.8) | 26.5 (79.7) | 30.1 (86.2) | 31.8 (89.2) | 28.7 (83.7) | 24.0 (75.2) | 18.5 (65.3) | 12.9 (55.2) | 21.1 (70.0) |
| Daily mean °C (°F) | 7.0 (44.6) | 7.8 (46.0) | 11.0 (51.8) | 15.3 (59.5) | 19.7 (67.5) | 23.0 (73.4) | 26.8 (80.2) | 28.0 (82.4) | 24.8 (76.6) | 20.0 (68.0) | 14.4 (57.9) | 9.2 (48.6) | 17.3 (63.0) |
| Mean daily minimum °C (°F) | 3.6 (38.5) | 4.1 (39.4) | 7.2 (45.0) | 11.3 (52.3) | 15.8 (60.4) | 20.0 (68.0) | 24.4 (75.9) | 25.2 (77.4) | 21.8 (71.2) | 16.4 (61.5) | 10.5 (50.9) | 5.7 (42.3) | 13.8 (56.9) |
| Mean minimum °C (°F) | −1.1 (30.0) | −0.7 (30.7) | 1.2 (34.2) | 5.2 (41.4) | 10.8 (51.4) | 16.1 (61.0) | 20.6 (69.1) | 21.7 (71.1) | 17.0 (62.6) | 10.5 (50.9) | 4.6 (40.3) | 0.5 (32.9) | −1.7 (28.9) |
| Record low °C (°F) | −4.9 (23.2) | −6.1 (21.0) | −3.9 (25.0) | −0.4 (31.3) | 5.7 (42.3) | 11.6 (52.9) | 14.2 (57.6) | 17.1 (62.8) | 10.0 (50.0) | 4.8 (40.6) | 0.4 (32.7) | −3.3 (26.1) | −6.1 (21.0) |
| Average precipitation mm (inches) | 63.4 (2.50) | 81.1 (3.19) | 120.7 (4.75) | 152.9 (6.02) | 171.1 (6.74) | 328.9 (12.95) | 342.2 (13.47) | 255.4 (10.06) | 195.6 (7.70) | 98.6 (3.88) | 101.6 (4.00) | 77.5 (3.05) | 1,989 (78.31) |
| Average snowfall cm (inches) | 1 (0.4) | trace | 0 (0) | 0 (0) | 0 (0) | 0 (0) | 0 (0) | 0 (0) | 0 (0) | 0 (0) | 0 (0) | 0 (0) | 1 (0.4) |
| Average precipitation days (≥ 1.0 mm) | 8.1 | 8.1 | 9.9 | 8.9 | 8.8 | 12.3 | 11.3 | 10.2 | 9.1 | 6.2 | 7.7 | 7.4 | 108 |
| Average snowy days (≥ 1 cm) | 0.3 | 0.1 | 0 | 0 | 0 | 0 | 0 | 0 | 0 | 0 | 0 | 0 | 0.4 |
| Average relative humidity (%) | 63 | 62 | 63 | 66 | 70 | 78 | 79 | 76 | 71 | 65 | 66 | 62 | 68 |
| Mean monthly sunshine hours | 111.5 | 128.2 | 167.2 | 183.2 | 197.2 | 128.2 | 165.6 | 209.0 | 177.6 | 188.6 | 142.1 | 122.0 | 1,922.9 |
Source: Japan Meteorological Agency

== Demographics ==
Per Japanese census data, the population of Sasebo in 2020 is 243,223 people. Sasebo has been conducting censuses since 1920.

Historical population

| Year | Pop. | ±% |
|---|---|---|
| 1920 | 183,601 | — |
| 1925 | 196,391 | +7.0% |
| 1930 | 228,039 | +16.1% |
| 1935 | 277,451 | +21.7% |
| 1940 | 312,817 | +12.7% |
| 1945 | 281,555 | −10.0% |
| 1950 | 313,259 | +11.3% |
| 1955 | 351,820 | +12.3% |
| 1960 | 346,598 | −1.5% |
| 1965 | 302,431 | −12.7% |
| 1970 | 287,936 | −4.8% |

| Year | Pop. | ±% |
|---|---|---|
| 1975 | 288,368 | +0.2% |
| 1980 | 288,231 | −0.0% |
| 1985 | 287,349 | −0.3% |
| 1990 | 280,261 | −2.5% |
| 1995 | 279,551 | −0.3% |
| 2000 | 274,399 | −1.8% |
| 2005 | 269,574 | −1.8% |
| 2010 | 261,146 | −3.1% |
| 2015 | 255,439 | −2.2% |
| 2020 | 243,223 | −4.8% |

Sasebo population statistics

== History ==
The area of present-day Sasebo was part of ancient Hizen Province. It was a small fishing village under the control of nearby Hirado Domain until shortly after the start of the Meiji period. Imperial Japanese Navy Admiral Tōgō Heihachirō, when surveying the coasts of northwestern Kyūshū for the site of a navy base, selected this location based on its protected, deep-water harbor, geographic proximity to China and Korea, and the presence of nearby coal fields. Sasebo Naval District, founded in 1886, became the major port for the Japanese navy in its operations in the First Sino-Japanese War and Russo-Japanese War. It remained a major naval base to the end of World War II. Along with the base facilities, the navy also constructed the Sasebo Naval Arsenal, which included major shipyards and repair facilities. After the end of the war, part of the base facilities were taken over by the United States Navy, which formed U.S. Fleet Activities Sasebo. Some parts of the base are shared with the Japan Self-Defense Forces, in particular the JMSDF. The primary base of the JGSDF's Western Army Infantry Regiment is also among the facilities there.

The village of Sasebo was established on April 1, 1889 with the creation of the modern municipalities system. It was raised directly to city status on April 1, 1902. Sasebo annexed the neighboring villages: Sase, Hio and Hirota on April 1, 1927 and town of Ainoura on April 1, 1938. The city had 206,000 inhabitants in 1945 and suffered severe damage by United States bombing on June 29, 1945, during World War II. 48% of the city was destroyed. Sasebo was one of the original 17 targets considered by the United States as a target for the atomic bomb intended to end the war. The city continued to grow by annexing neighboring municipalities: Ono, Minamise, Nakazato, Saki (May 27, 1942), Yuzuki and Kuroshima (April 1, 1954), Orioze, Egami, Sakihario (April 1, 1955), Miya (August 1, 1958). On April 1, Sasebo was designated a special city with increased local autonomy. This designation was raised to core city on April 1, 2016.

- On April 1, 2005, the towns of Sechibaru and Yoshii (both from Kitamatsuura District) were merged into Sasebo.
- On March 31, 2006, the towns of Kosaza and Uku (both from Kitamatsuura District) were merged into Sasebo.
- On March 31, 2010, the towns of Emukae and Shikamachi (both from Kitamatsuura District) were merged into Sasebo.

== Government ==
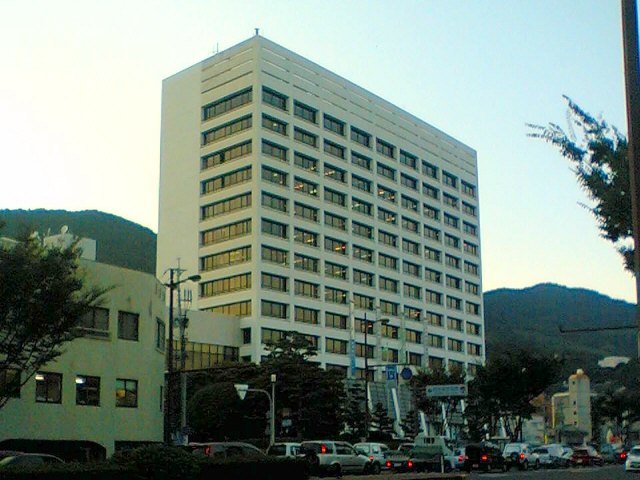
Sasebo City Hall

Sasebo has a mayor-council form of government with a directly elected mayor and a unicameral city council of 33 members. Sasebo contributes nine members to the Nagasaki Prefectural Assembly. In terms of national politics, the city is part of the Nagasaki 3rd district of the lower house of the Diet of Japan. Part of the city was previously part of Nagasaki 4th district, which was abolished in 2022.

== Economy ==
Shipbuilding and associated heavy industries continue to dominate the economy of Sasebo. Adjacent to the naval base is the shipyard of Sasebo Heavy Industries Co., Ltd.

The Port of Sasebo has an active fishing fleet. In addition, many oyster and pearl farms are located on the Kujū-ku Islands.

The Mikawachi district has a 400-year-old pottery manufacturing industry.

== Education ==
Sasebo has 42 public elementary schools, 25 public junior high schools and two combined elementary/junior high schools operated by the city government and one public junior high school operated by the Fukuoka Prefectural Board of Education. The prefecture also operates nine public high schools and two schools for the handicapped. There is also one national high school and five private high schools. Institutions of higher education include the private Nagasaki International University and Nagasaki Junior College.

== Transportation ==
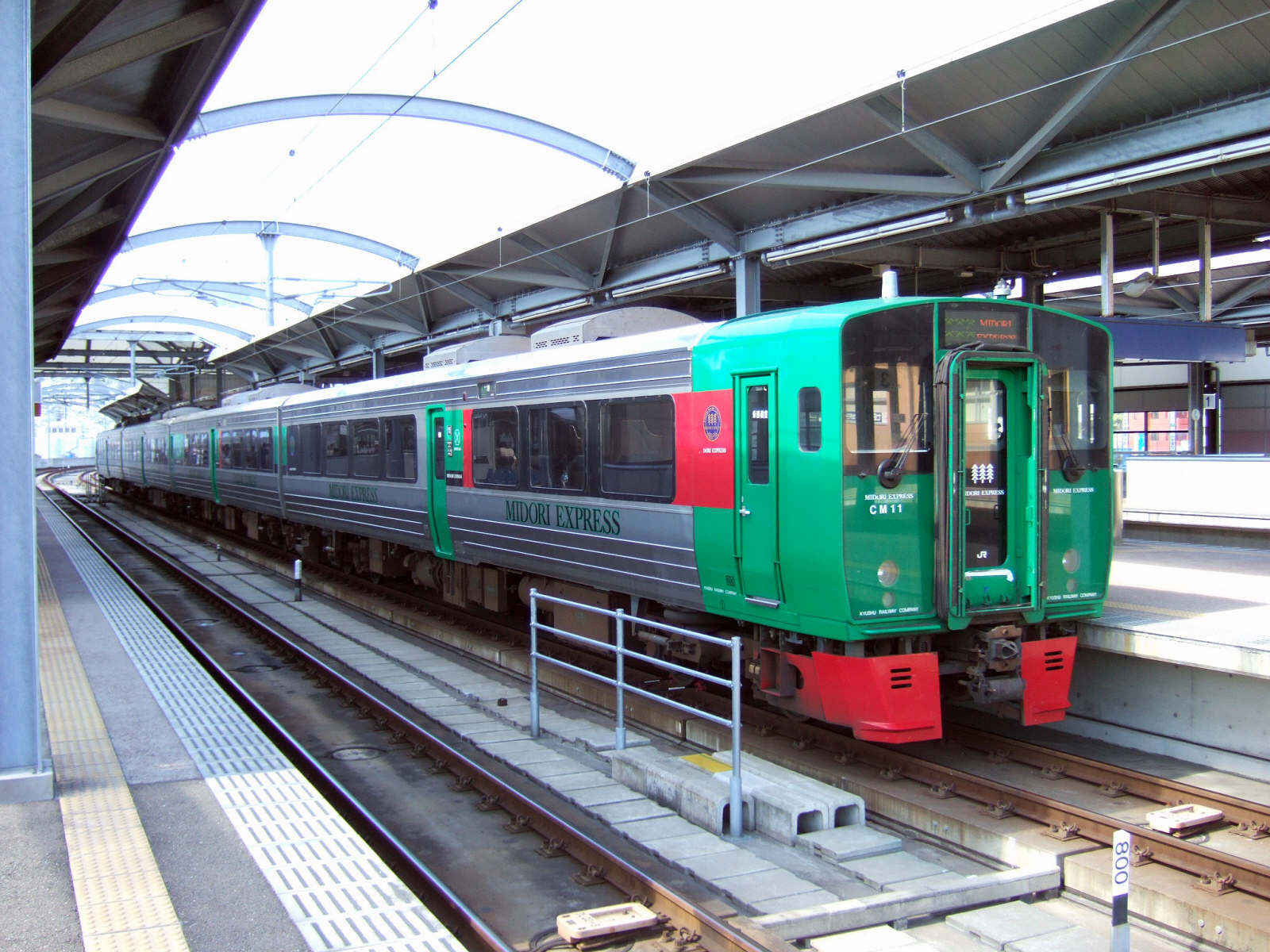
Midori Express trains on the Sasebo Line provide fast transportation to/from Fukuoka's Hakata Station

=== Railways ===
JR Kyushu - Sasebo Line

- Mikawachi - Haiki - Daitō - Hiu - Sasebo

JR Kyushu - Ōmura Line

- Huis Ten Bosch - Haenosaki

Matsuura Railway- Nishi-Kyūshū Line

- Suetachibana - Emukae-Shikamachi - Takaiwa - Inotsuki - Senryūgataki - Yoshii - Kōda - Seihō-Koukou-Mae - Saza - Koura - Masaru - Tanagata - Ainoura - Daigaku - Kami-Ainoura - Motoyama - Nakazato - Kaize - Nonaka - Hidariishi - Senpukuji - Yamanota - Kita-Sasebo - Naka-Sasebo - Sasebo-Chūō - Sasebo

=== Highways ===
- Nishi-Kyūshū Expressway
- National Route 35
- National Route 202
- National Route 204
- National Route 205
- National Route 384
- National Route 498

== Sister cities ==
Sasebo has sister-city relations with the following:

- Albuquerque, New Mexico, United States
- Coffs Harbour, New South Wales, Australia
- Kokonoe, Ōita
- Paju, Korea
- Shenyang, Liaoning, China (friendship city)
- Xiamen, Fujian, China

== Points of interest ==
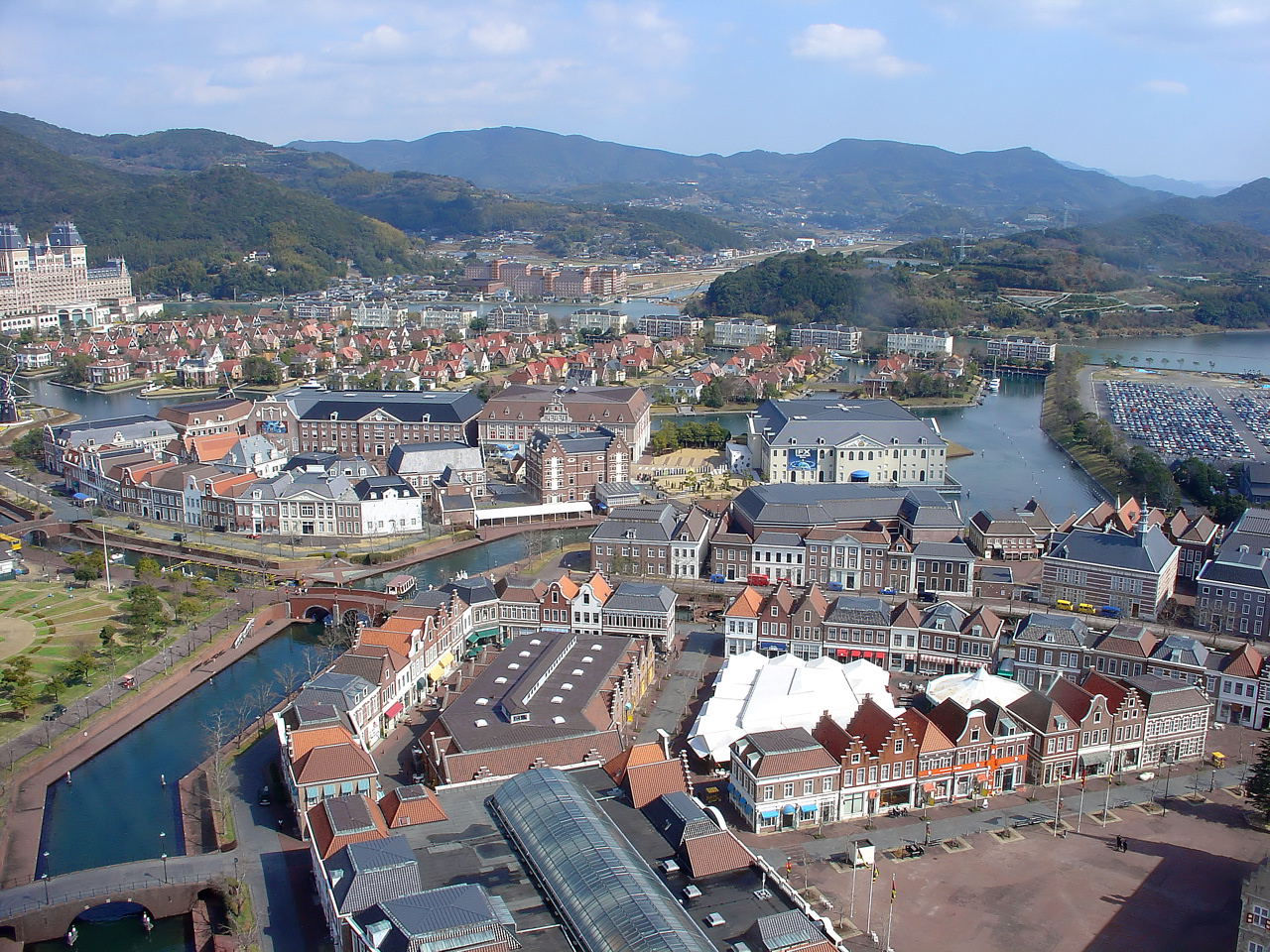
Huis Ten Bosch theme park

- Fukui cave, National Historic Site
- Huis Ten Bosch (theme park) is inspired by a Dutch trading post in nearby Hirado
- Japan Maritime Self-Defense Force Museum
- Kōzakihana, westernmost point on the island of Kyūshū
- Kujū-ku Islands
- Miuramachi Catholic Church, a large church which was built in a neogothic style in 1930, is the symbol of Sasebo. It is opposite the main railway station in Miura-cho district. Sasebo is the only Japanese city that uses the image of a Christian church as part of its seal/flag.
- Saikai Pearl Sea Resort
- Sasebo City Museum Shimanose Art Center
- Sasebo Zoological Park and Botanical Garden
- Senpukuji Cave
- Tenkaihō

== Cityscape ==
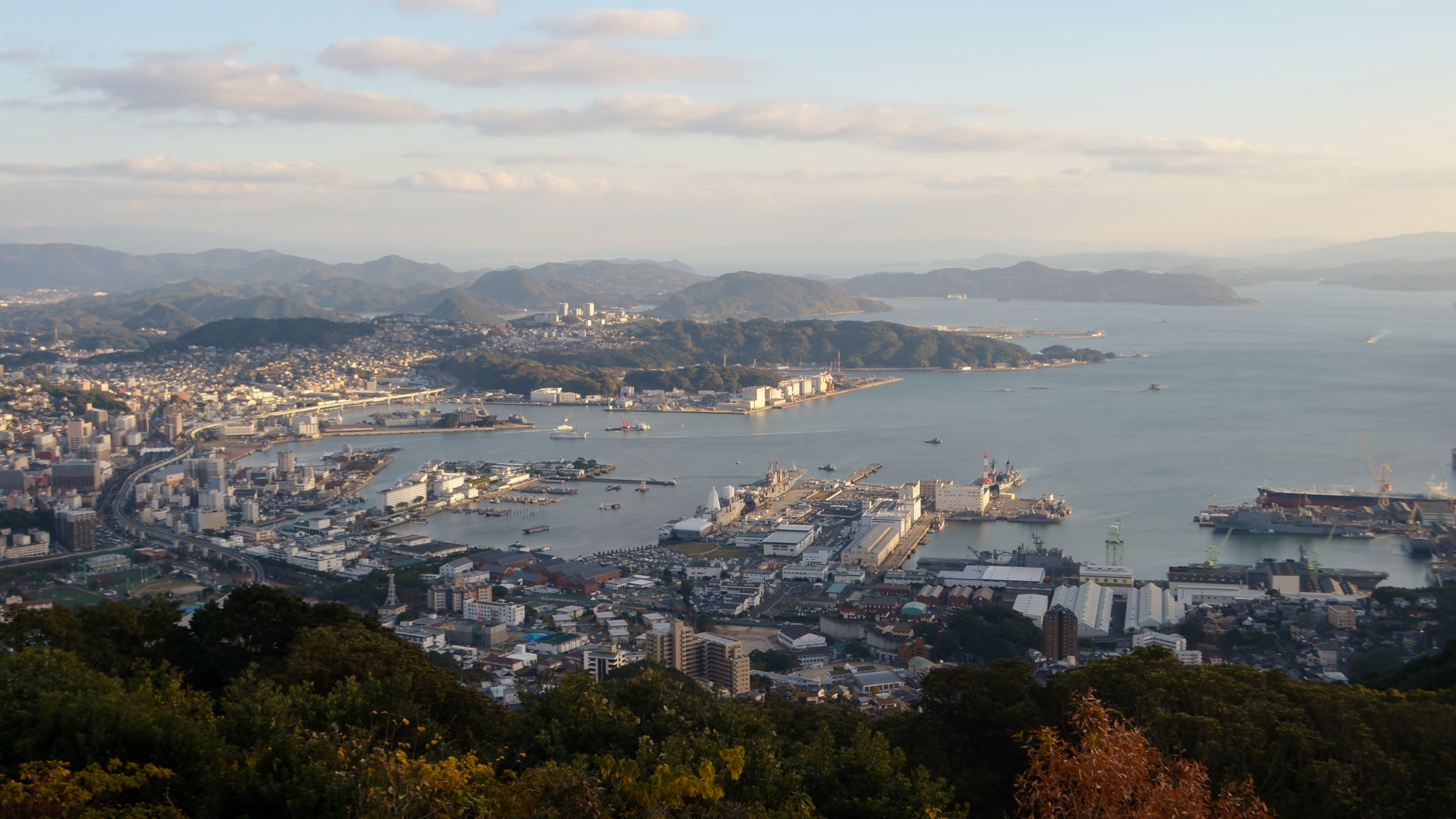
thumb
