= Daigaku Station =

Railway station in Sasebo, Nagasaki prefecture, Japan

Coordinates: 33.1895°N 129.6674°E

Daigaku Station 大学駅
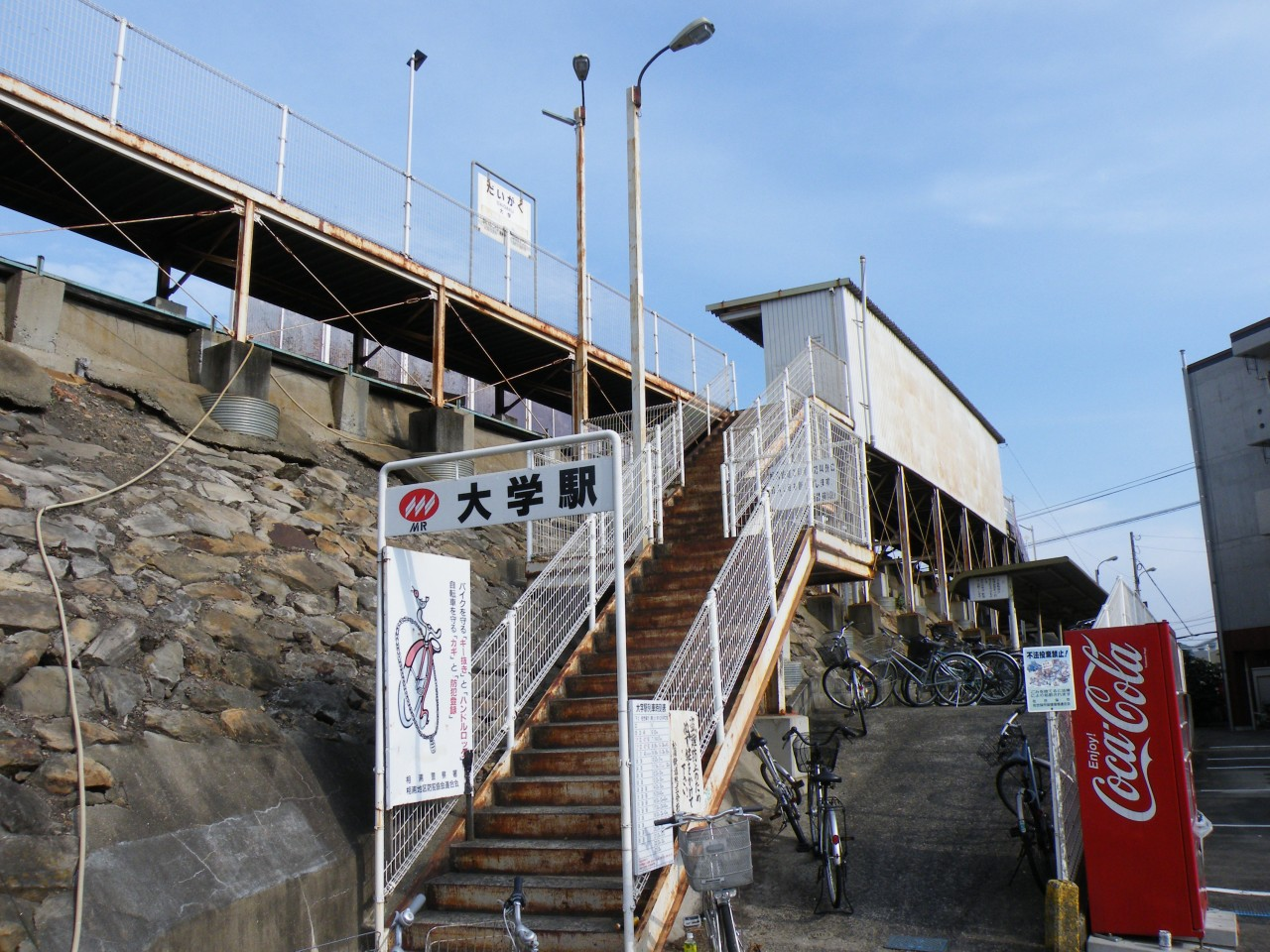

General information
- Location: Kawashimo-cho, Sasebo, Nagasaki （佐世保市川下町） Japan
- Operator: Matsuura Railway
- Line: Nishi-Kyūshū Line

History
- Opened: 1991
- Former names: Daigaku-mae (until 1994)

Passengers
- 2006: 896 daily
Location

Daigaku Station (大学駅, Daigaku-eki) is the railway station in Kawashimo-cho, Sasebo City, Nagasaki Prefecture. It is operated by Matsuura Railway and is on the Nishi-Kyūshū Line.

== Lines ==
- Matsuura Railway
  - Nishi-Kyūshū Line

== Adjacent stations ==
←	Service	→
Nishi-Kyūshū Line
Ainoura	Local	Kami-Ainoura
Ainoura	Rapid Service	Kami-Ainoura

== Station layout ==
The station is on a bank with a single side platform.

== Environs ==
- University of Nagasaki (長崎県立大学, Nagasaki-Kenritsu-Daigaku)
- Nagasaki Junior College (長崎短期大学, Nagasaki-Tanki-Daigaku)
- Kyushu Bunka Gakuen High School
- Sasebo Jitsugyo High School
- Sasebo city synthesis ground
- JGSDF Ainoura garrison

== History ==
- 1991-03-16 - Opens for business as Daigaku-mae Station (大学前駅, Daigaku-mae-eki) .
- 1994-10-03 - Renamed to present name.
