= Meotoishi Station =

Train station on the Matsuura Railway line in Saga Prefecture, Japan

Meotoishi Station 夫婦石駅
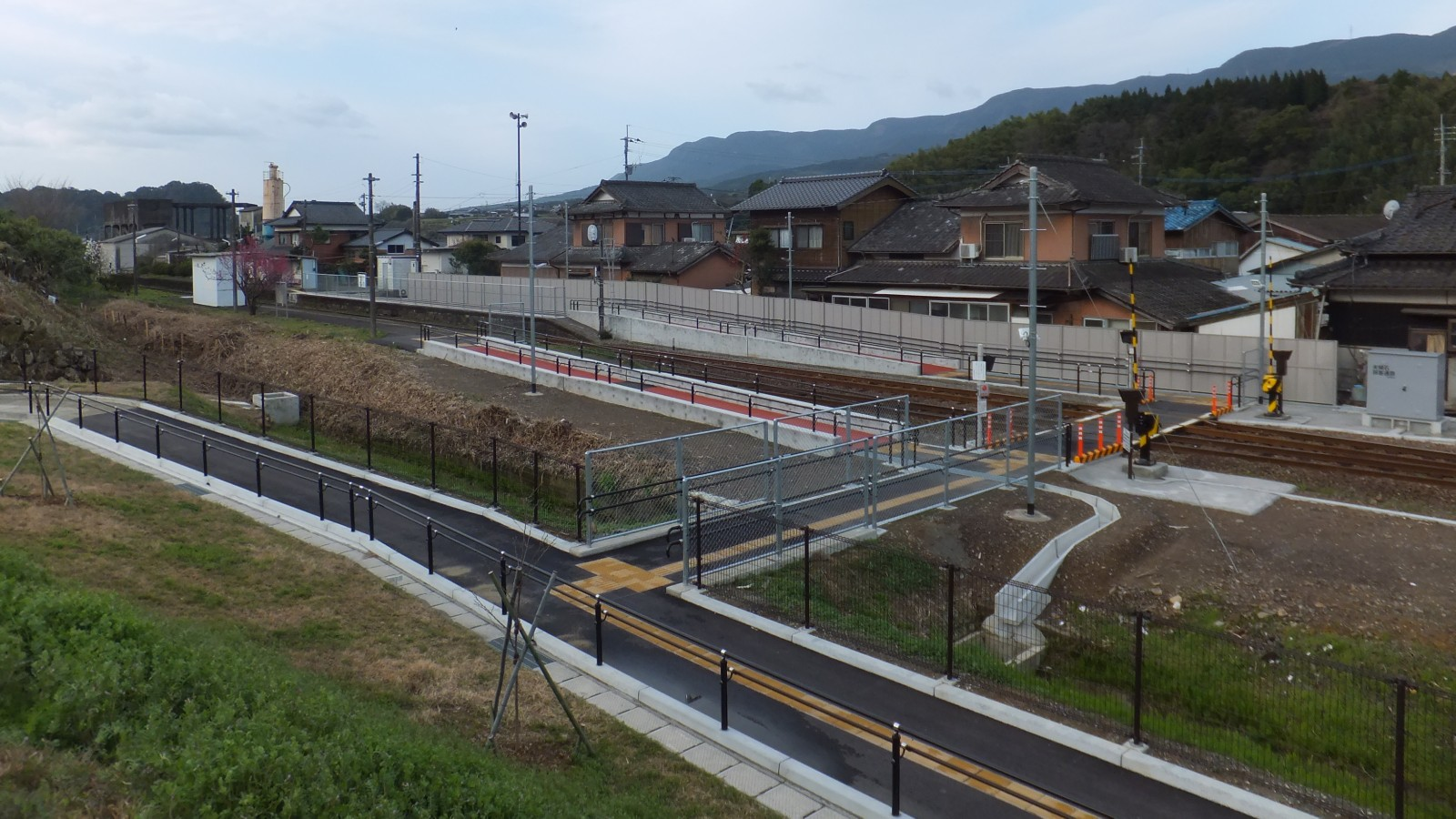
- Station with new walkway in March 2012

General information
- Location: Arita, Nishimatsuura District, Saga Prefecture; Japan
- Coordinates: 33°14′13.88″N 129°51′2.39″E
- Operator: Matsuura Railway
- Line: ■ Nishi-Kyūshū Line
- Distance: 7.9 km from Arita Station
- Platforms: 1 (active)
- Tracks: 1 (active)

Construction
- Structure type: At-grade

Other information
- Website: Official website (in Japanese)

History
- Opened: 7 August 1898; 128 years ago
- Original company: Imari Railway
Location
- Location within Saga Prefecture Location within Japan

Meotoishi Station (夫婦石駅, Meotoishi-eki) is a train station located in Arita, Saga Prefecture, Japan. It is on the Nishi-Kyūshū Line which has been operated by the third-sector Matsuura Railway since 1988.

== Lines ==
- Matsuura Railway
  - Nishi-Kyūshū Line

Trains on this branch terminate at either Arita or Imari. Travellers can transfer at Imari for local trains to Saza, then onto a local or rapid train to Sasebo. It is 7.9 km from Arita.

== Station layout ==
The station consists of one ground-level side platform with a bi-directional track and passing track. The former second platform is now a fenced-off pedestrian walkway.

== Adjacent stations ==
«	Service	»
Nishi-Kyūshū Line
Yamadani	Local	Kanatake

== See also ==
- List of railway stations in Japan
