= Ainoura Station =

Train station on the Matsuura Railway line in Nagasaki Prefecture, Japan

Ainoura Station 相浦駅
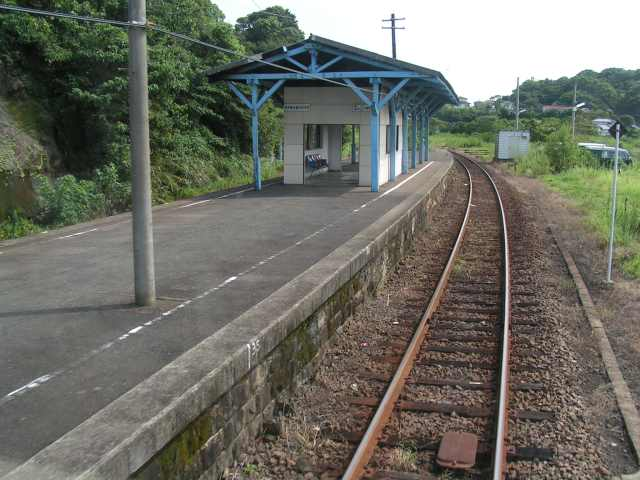
- Station island platform in August 2006

General information
- Location: Sasebo, Nagasaki Prefecture; Japan
- Coordinates: 33°11′33.60″N 129°39′26.05″E
- Operator: Matsuura Railway
- Line: ■ Nishi-Kyūshū Line
- Distance: 79.7 km from Arita Station
- Platforms: 1
- Tracks: 1

Construction
- Structure type: At-grade

Other information
- Website: Official website (in Japanese)

History
- Opened: 27 March 1920; 106 years ago
- Original company: Japanese National Railways
Location
- Location within Nagasaki Prefecture Location within Japan

Ainoura Station (相浦駅, Ainoura-eki; あいのうらえき) is a train station located in Sasebo, Nagasaki Prefecture, Japan. It is on the Nishi-Kyūshū Line which has been operated by the third-sector Matsuura Railway since 1988.

== Lines ==
- Matsuura Railway
  - Nishi-Kyūshū Line

Trains on this branch terminate at either Saza or Sasebo. Travellers can transfer at Saza for local trains to Imari, and then on to Arita. It is 79.7 km from Arita.

== Station layout ==
The station consists of one ground-level island platform with two track.

== Adjacent stations ==
«	Service	»
Nishi-Kyūshū Line
Tanagata	Local	Daigaku
Tanagata	Rapid	Daigaku

== See also ==
- List of railway stations in Japan
