= Tanagata Station =

Train station on the Matsuura Railway line in Nagasaki Prefecture, Japan

Tanagata Station 棚方駅
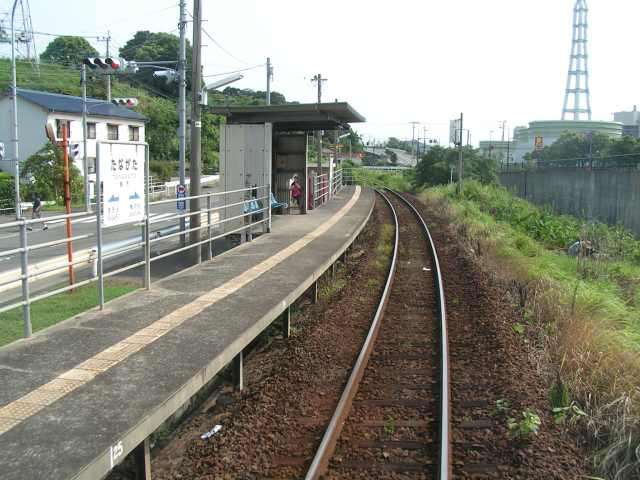
- Station platform in August 2006

General information
- Location: Sasebo, Nagasaki Prefecture; Japan
- Coordinates: 33°12′7.28″N 129°39′7.01″E
- Operator: Matsuura Railway
- Line: ■ Nishi-Kyūshū Line
- Distance: 78.3 km from Arita Station
- Platforms: 1
- Tracks: 1

Construction
- Structure type: At-grade

Other information
- Website: Official website (in Japanese)

History
- Opened: 11 March 1989; 37 years ago
- Original company: Matsuura Railway
Location
- Location within Nagasaki Prefecture Location within Japan

Tanagata Station (棚方駅, Tanagata-eki; たながたえき) is a train station located in Sasebo, Nagasaki Prefecture, Japan. It is on the Nishi-Kyūshū Line which has been operated by the third-sector Matsuura Railway since 1988.

== Lines ==
- Matsuura Railway
  - Nishi-Kyūshū Line

Trains on this branch terminate at either Saza or Sasebo. Travellers can transfer at Saza for local trains to Imari, and then on to Arita. It is 78.3 km from Arita.

== Station layout ==
The station consists of one ground-level side platform with a bi-directional track.

== Adjacent stations ==
«	Service	»
Nishi-Kyūshū Line
Masaru	Local	Ainoura
Koura	Rapid	Ainoura

== See also ==
- List of railway stations in Japan
