= Masaru Station =

Train station on the Matsuura Railway line in Nagasaki Prefecture, Japan

Masaru Station 真申駅
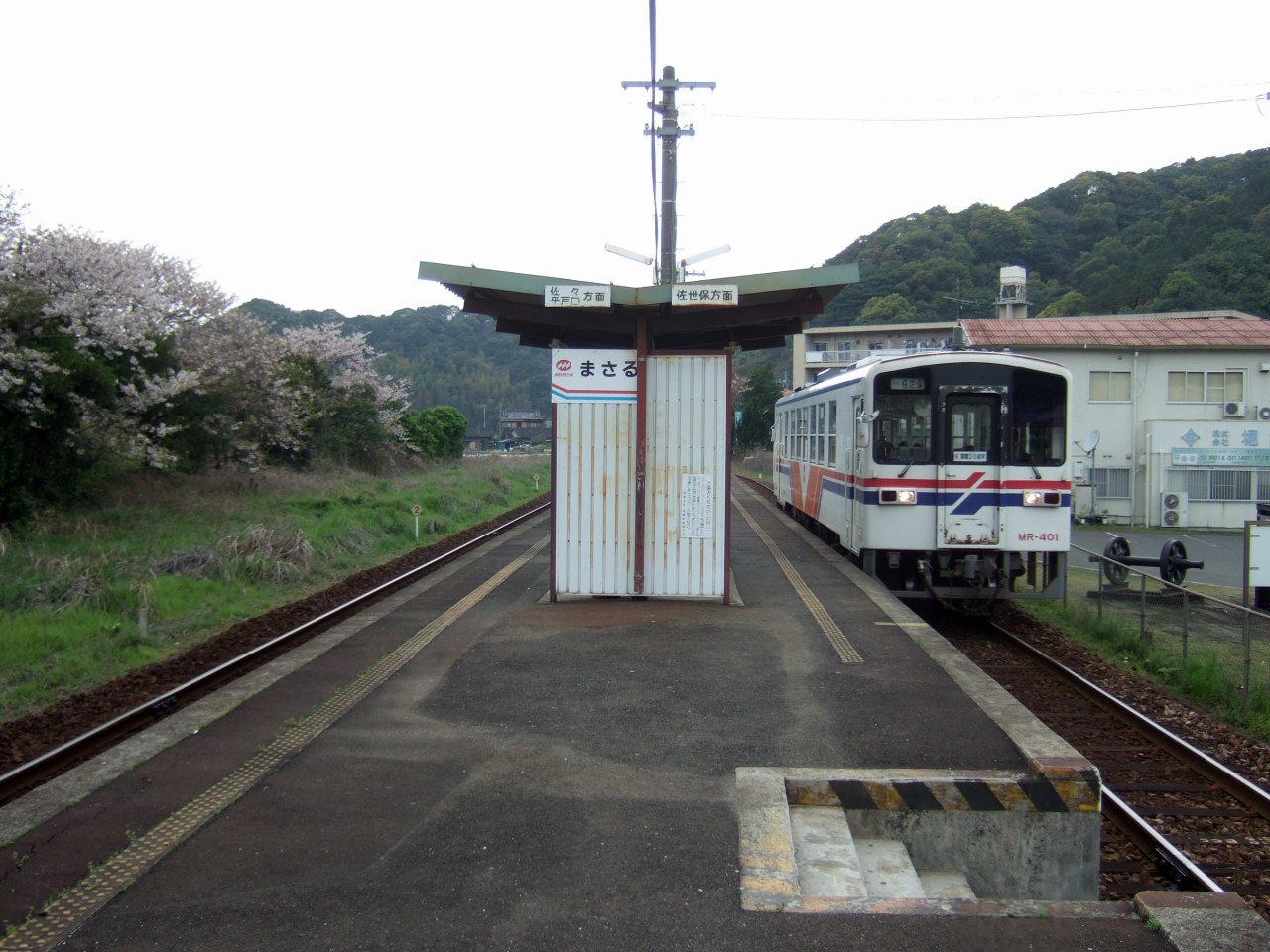
- Island platform in April 2008

General information
- Location: Sasebo, Nagasaki Prefecture; Japan
- Coordinates: 33°12′24.15″N 129°39′4.58″E
- Operator: Matsuura Railway
- Line: ■ Nishi-Kyūshū Line
- Distance: 77.7 km from Arita Station
- Platforms: 2
- Tracks: 2

Construction
- Structure type: At-grade

Other information
- Website: Official website (in Japanese)

History
- Opened: 29 August 1931; 94 years ago
- Original company: Japanese National Railways
Location
- Location within Nagasaki Prefecture Location within Japan

Masaru Station (真申駅, Masaru-eki; まさるえき) is a train station located in Sasebo, Nagasaki Prefecture, Japan. It is on the Nishi-Kyūshū Line which has been operated by the third-sector Matsuura Railway since 1988.

== Lines ==
- Matsuura Railway
  - Nishi-Kyūshū Line

Trains on this branch terminate at either Saza or Sasebo. Travellers can transfer at Saza for local trains to Imari, and then on to Arita. The rapid service between Saza and Sasebo does not stop here. It is 77.7 km from Arita.

== Station layout ==
The station consists of one ground-level island platform with two tracks.

== Adjacent stations ==
«	Service	»
Nishi-Kyūshū Line
Koura	Local	Tanagata
Rapid Service: Does not stop at this station

== See also ==
- List of railway stations in Japan
