= Hidariishi Station =

Railway station in Sasebo, Nagasaki prefecture, Japan

Coordinates: 33.2090°N 129.7222°E

Hidariishi Station 左石駅
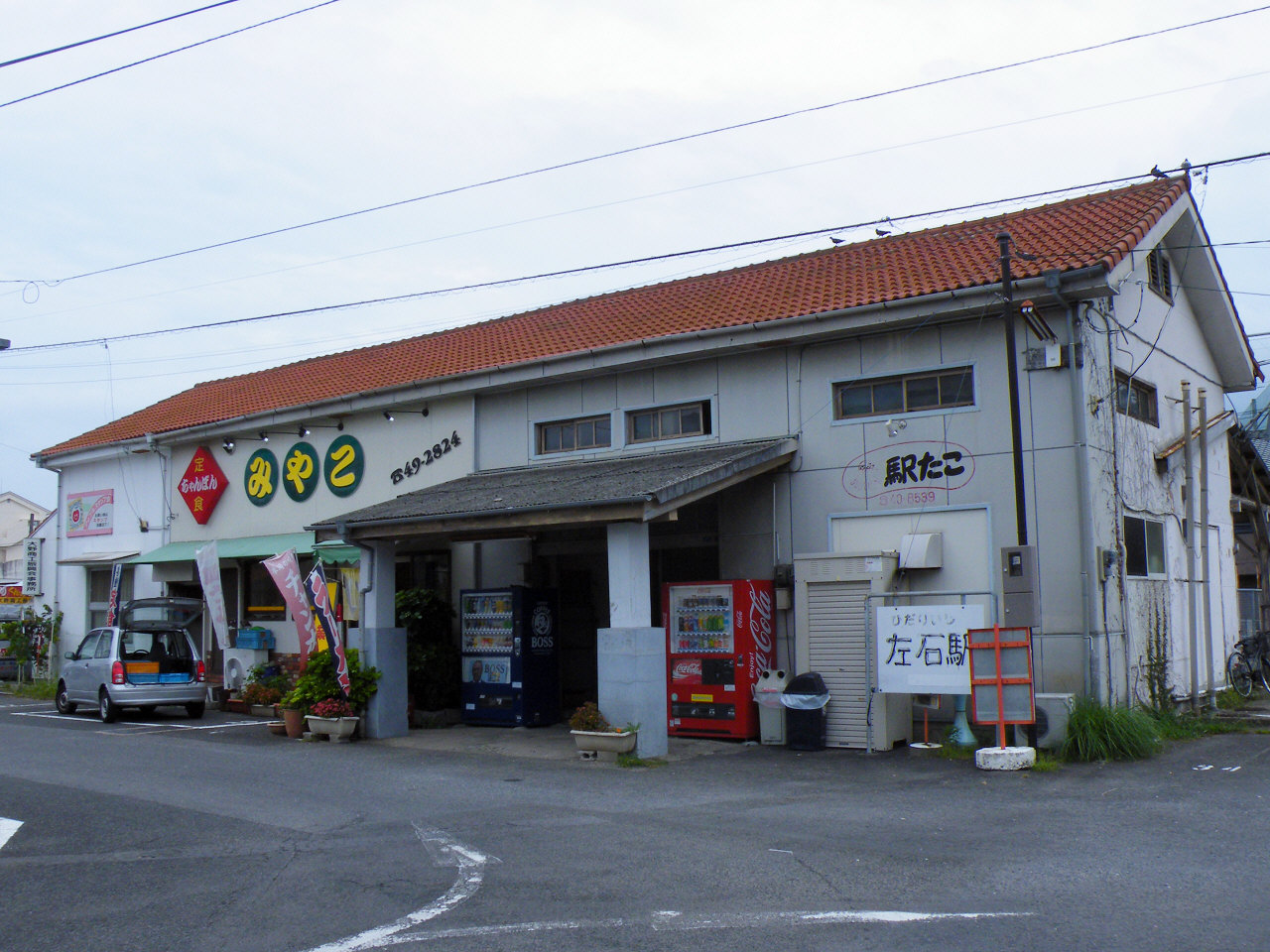

General information
- Location: Tabaru-chō, Sasebo, Nagasaki （佐世保市田原町） Japan
- Operator: Matsuura Railway
- Line: Nishi-Kyūshū Line

History
- Opened: 1920
- Former names: Ōno (until 1929)

Passengers
- 2006: 872 daily
Location

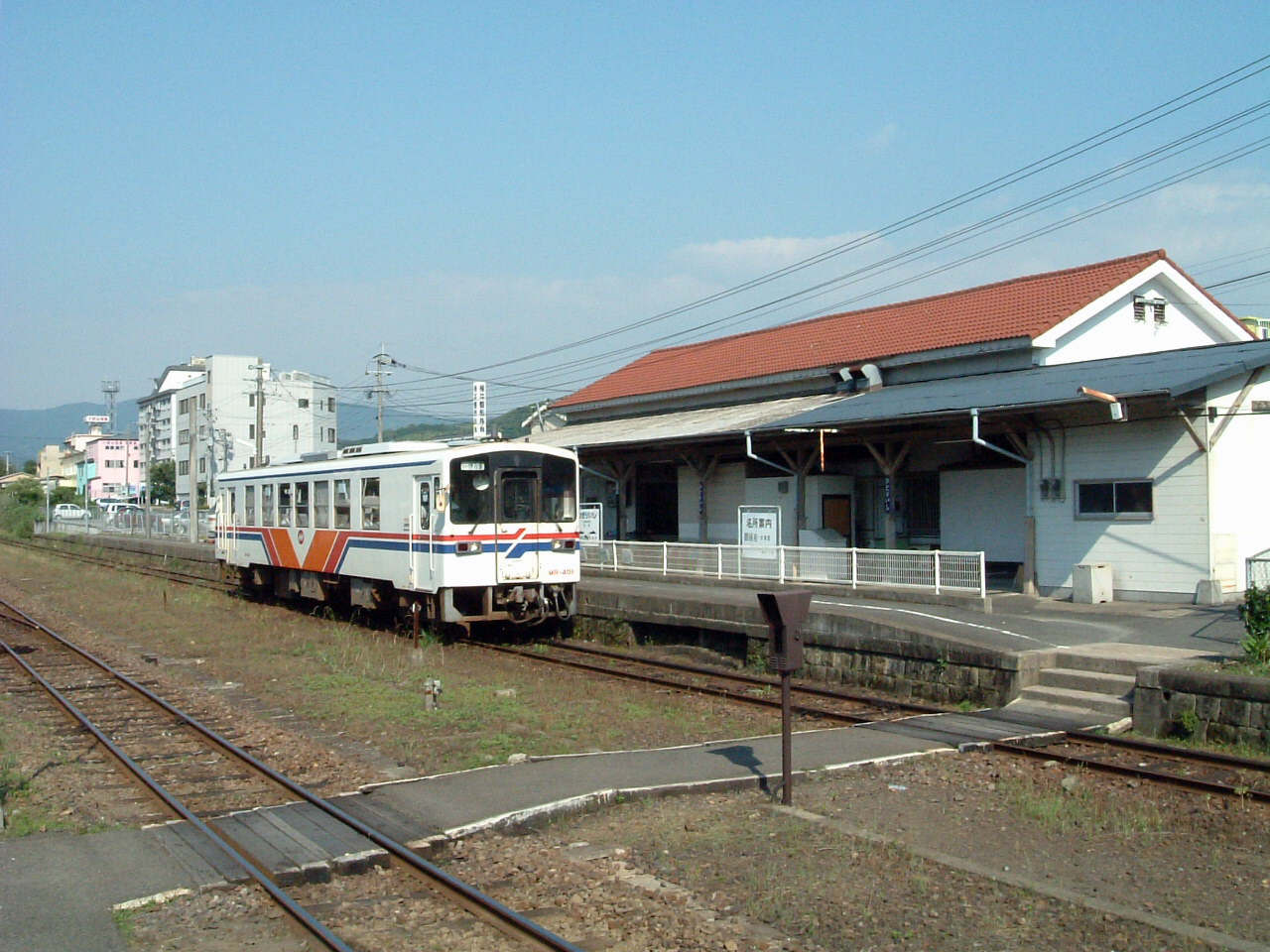
Station Building and Platform for Imari

Hidariishi Station (左石駅, Hidariishi-eki) is a railway station in Sasebo, Nagasaki, Japan. It is operated by Matsuura Railway and is located on the Nishi-Kyūshū Line.

== Lines ==
The station is served by the Nishi-Kyūshū Line.

== Station layout ==
The station is ground level with 2 side platforms and 2 tracks.

== Environs ==
- National Route 204
- Ōno waiting place (Saihi Motor)
- Sasebo City Office Ōno Branch
- Sasebo-Nishi High School
- Meganeiwa
- Sasebo Municipal Ōno Junior High School
- Sasebo-Kita Post Office
- Norito Shrine

== History ==
- March 27, 1920 - Opens for business by Sasebo Keiben Railway (after Sasebo Railway) as Ōno Station (大野駅, Ōno-eki).
- April 20, 1929 - Report the rename to present name.
- October 1, 1936 - The Railroad Ministry nationalizes all railroads, this station becomes a station of the JGR Matsuura Line.
- July 9, 1967 - Yunoki Line (from this station to Yunoki Station) becomes the whole line interruption by a flood.
- September 1, 1967 - Yunoki Line is discontinued.
- April 1, 1987 - Railways privatize and this station is inherited by JR Kyushu.
- April 1, 1988 - This station is inherited by Matsuura Railway.

== Adjacent stations ==
←	Service	→
Matsuura Railway
Nishi-Kyūshū Line
Nonaka	Local	Senpukuji
Motoyama	Rapid Service	Senpukuji
