= Sasebo-Chūō Station =

Railway station in Sasebo, Nagasaki prefecture, Japan

Sasebo-Chūō Station 佐世保中央駅
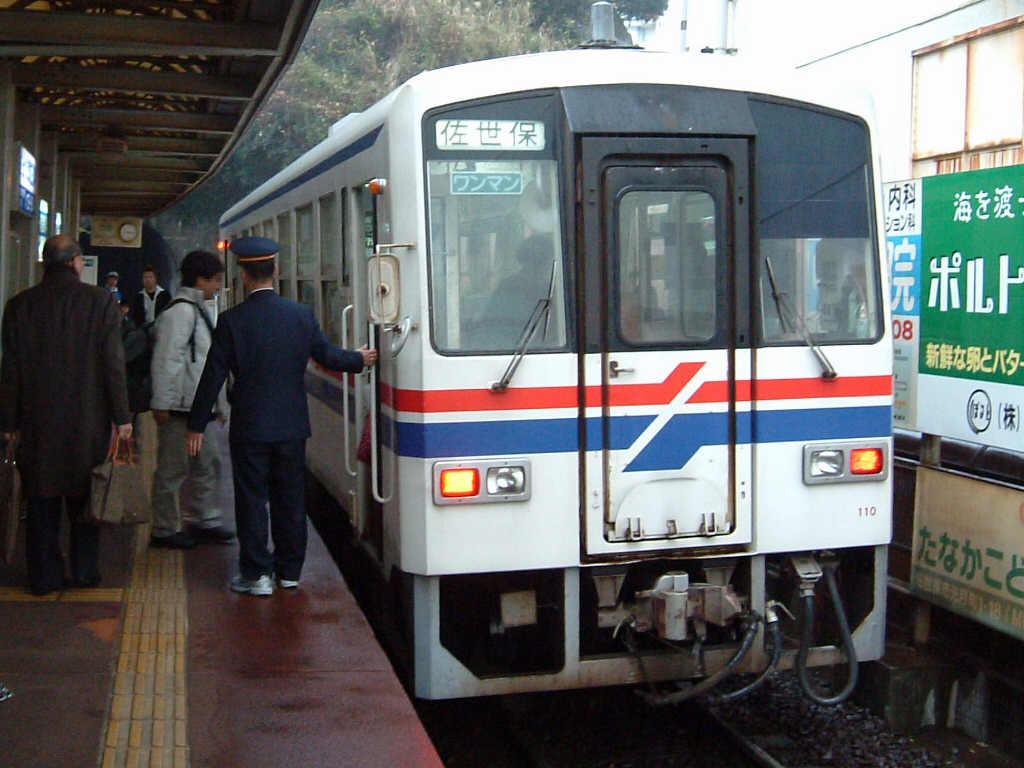

General information
- Location: Shimanose-chō, Sasebo-shi, Nagasaki-ken 857-0806; Japan
- Coordinates: 33°10′15.66″N 129°43′14.70″E
- Operator: Matsuura Railway
- Line: ■ Nishi-Kyūshū Line
- Distance: 92.8 km from Arita Station
- Platforms: 1 side platform

History
- Opened: 10 March 1990; 36 years ago

Passengers
- 2019: 951 daily
Location
- Location within Nagasaki Prefecture Location within Japan

Sasebo-Chūō Station (佐世保中央駅, Sasebo-Chūō-eki) is a passenger railway station located in the city of Sasebo, Nagasaki, Japan. It is operated by the third-sector Matsuura Railway and is located on the Nishi-Kyūshū Line.

== Lines ==
The station is served by the Nishi-Kyūshū Line and is 92.8 kilometers from the starting point of the line at Arita.

== Station layout ==
The station is elevated with a single side platform. There is a direct passageway to Sasebo Kyosai Hospital. The station is staffed.

== Adjacent stations ==
←	Service	→
Kita-Sasebo	Nishi-Kyūshū Line(Rapid Service)	Sasebo
Naka-Sasebo	Nishi-Kyūshū Line(Local)	Sasebo

== History ==
The station was opened on 10 March 1990.

== Passenger statistics ==
In fiscal 2019, the station was used by 951 passenger daily.

== Surrounding area ==
This station stands near the central area of Sasebo-City. The distance to Naka-Sasebo Station is only 200 metres (660 ft).

- Japan National Route 204
- Sasebo City Library
- Sasebo city museum Shimanose art center
- Sasebo Municipal General Hospital
- KKR Sasebo Kyosai Hospital

== See also ==
- List of railway stations in Japan
