= Naka-Sasebo Station =

Railway station in Sasebo, Nagasaki prefecture, Japan

Naka-Sasebo Station 中佐世保駅
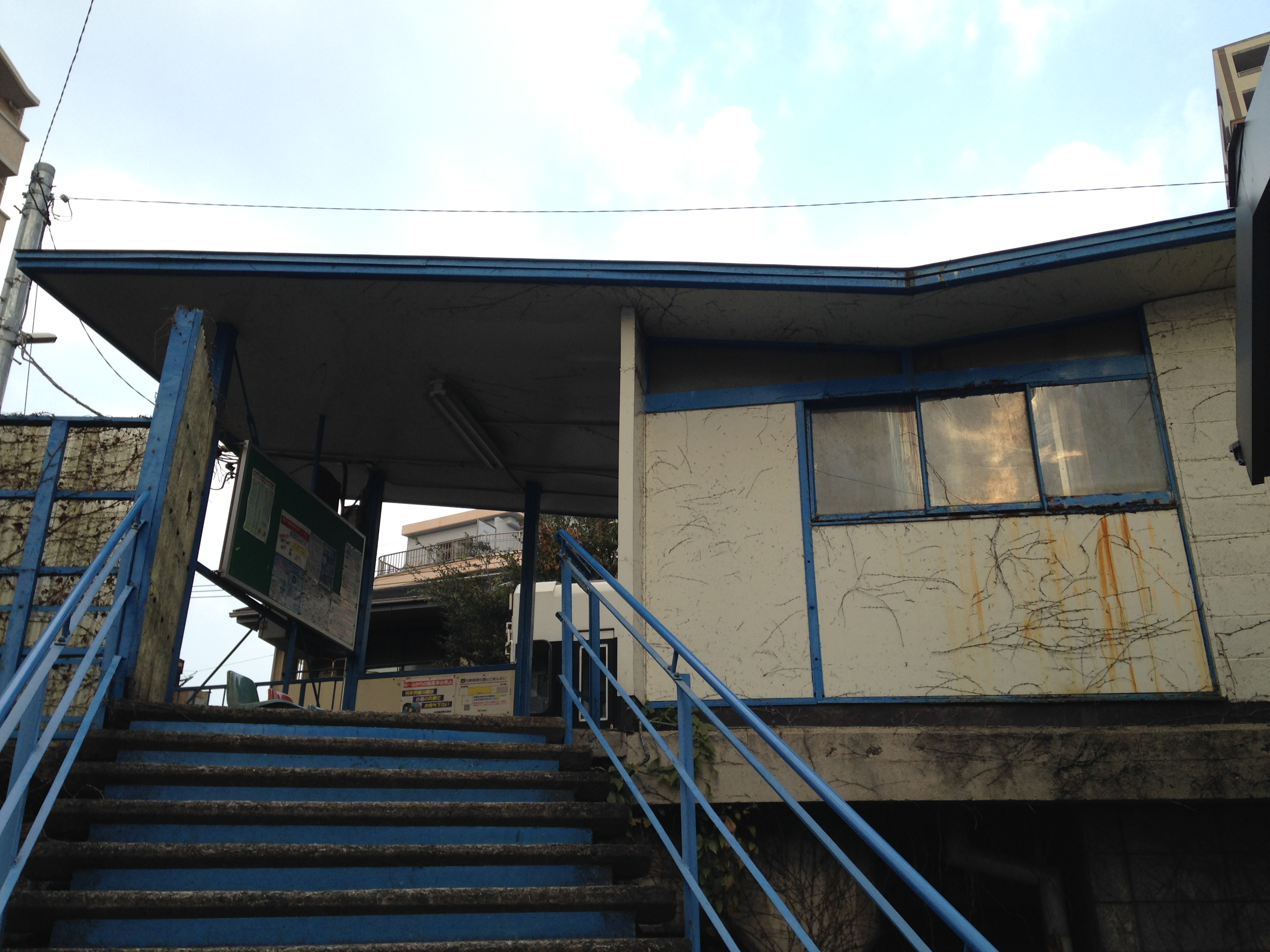
- Naka-Sasebo Station

General information
- Location: Shimanose-chō, Sasebo-shi, Nagasaki-ken 857-0806; Japan
- Coordinates: 33°10′19.86″N 129°43′20.54″E
- Operator: Matsuura Railway
- Line: ■ Nishi-Kyūshū Line
- Distance: 92.6 km from Arita Station
- Platforms: 1 side platform

History
- Opened: 15 July 1961

Passengers
- FY 2019: 178 daily
Location
- Location within Nagasaki Prefecture Location within Japan

Naka-Sasebo Station (中佐世保駅, Naka-Sasebo-eki) is a passenger railway station located in the city of Sasebo, Nagasaki, Japan. It is operated by Matsuura Railway and is located on the Nishi-Kyūshū Line.

== Lines ==
The station is served by the Nishi-Kyūshū Line and is 92.6 kilometers from the starting point of the line at Arita. Only local trains stop at this station

== Station layout ==
The station is elevated with a single side platform. The station is unattended.

== Adjacent stations ==
←	Service	→
Matsuura Railway
Nishi-Kyūshū Line
Kita-Sasebo	Local	Sasebo-Chūō
(Passed)	Rapid Service	(Passed)

== History ==
The station was opened on 15 July 1961 on the Japanese National Railway (JNR). The JNR was privatized on 1 April 1987, and the station came under the control of JR Kyushu. The station was inherited by the Matsuura Railway on 1 April 1988.

== Passenger statistics ==
In fiscal 2019, the station was used by 178 passenger daily.

== Surrounding area ==
The distance to Sasebo-Chūō Station is only 200 m.

- Yonkachō Shōtengai
- Sankachō Shōtengai
- Sasebo City Library
- Sasebo city museum Shimanose art center
- Sasebo Post Office

== See also ==
- List of railway stations in Japan
