= Kita-Sasebo Station =

Railway station in Sasebo, Nagasaki prefecture, Japan

Coordinates: 33.1871°N 129.7204°E

Kita-Sasebo Station 北佐世保駅
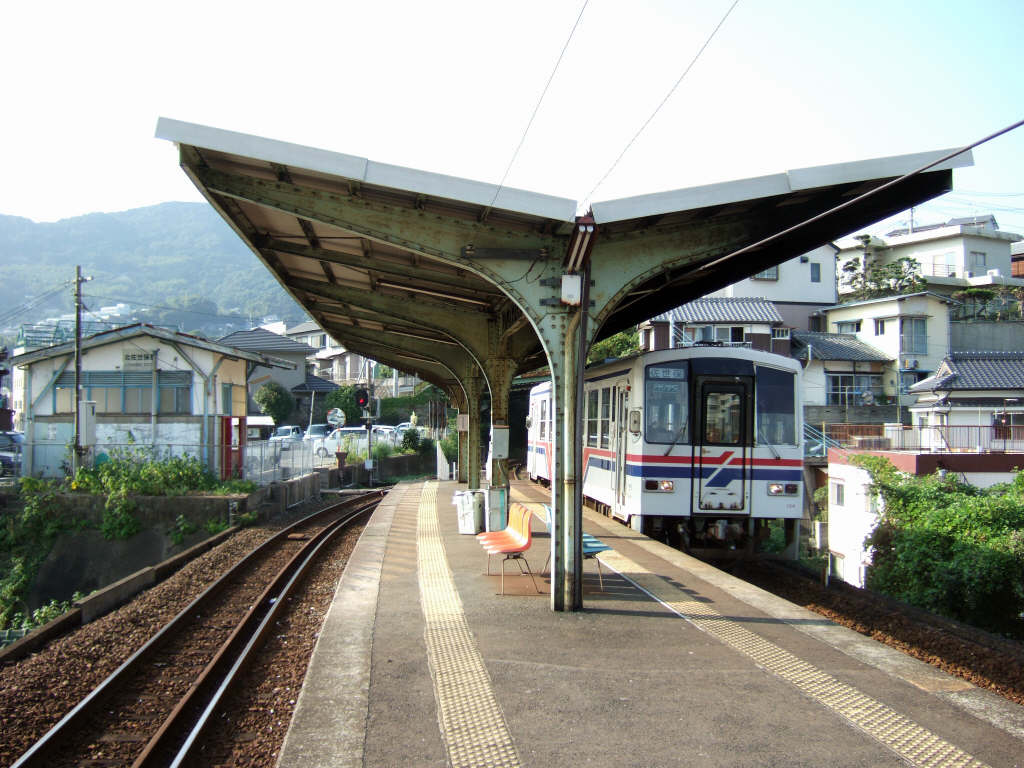

General information
- Location: Tawaramachi, Sasebo, Nagasaki （佐世保市俵町） Japan
- Operator: Matsuura Railway
- Line: Nishi-Kyūshū Line

History
- Opened: 1935

Passengers
- 2006: 419 daily
Location

Kita-Sasebo Station (北佐世保駅, Kita-Sasebo-eki) is the railway station in Tawara-machi, Sasebo, Nagasaki Prefecture.It is operated by Matsuura Railway and is on the Nishi-Kyūshū Line.

== Lines ==
- Matsuura Railway
  - Nishi-Kyūshū Line

== Adjacent stations ==
| ← | Service | → |
|---|---|---|
| Senpukuji | Nishi-Kyūshū Line(Rapid Service) | Sasebo-Chūō |
| Yamanota | Nishi-Kyūshū Line(Local) | Naka-Sasebo |

== Station layout ==
Kita-Sasebo Station has one ground level island platform serving two tracks.

== Environs ==
- National Route 204
- Tawaramachi Shōtengai
- Sakura-no-Seibo(The Holy Mother of the cherry tree) kindergarten (Ruins of Kami-Sasebo Station in Sasebo Railway)
- Sasebo-Chuo High School
- Seiwa Joshi Gakuin High School and Junior High School
- Sasasbo-Kita High School and Junior High School
- TSUTAYA

== History ==
- 9 November 1935 - Opens for business as station of the Sasebo Line.
- 30 August 1943 - Sasebo Line Sasebo - Kita-Sasebo is incorporated into Matsuura Line and becomes the station of the Matsuura line.
- 1 April 1987 - Railways privatize and this station is inherited by JR Kyushu.
- 1 April 1988 - This station is inherited by Matsuura Railway.
