= Yoshii Station (Nagasaki) =

Railway station in Sasebo, Japan

Coordinates: 33°15′59″N 129°41′07″E

Yoshii Station 吉井駅
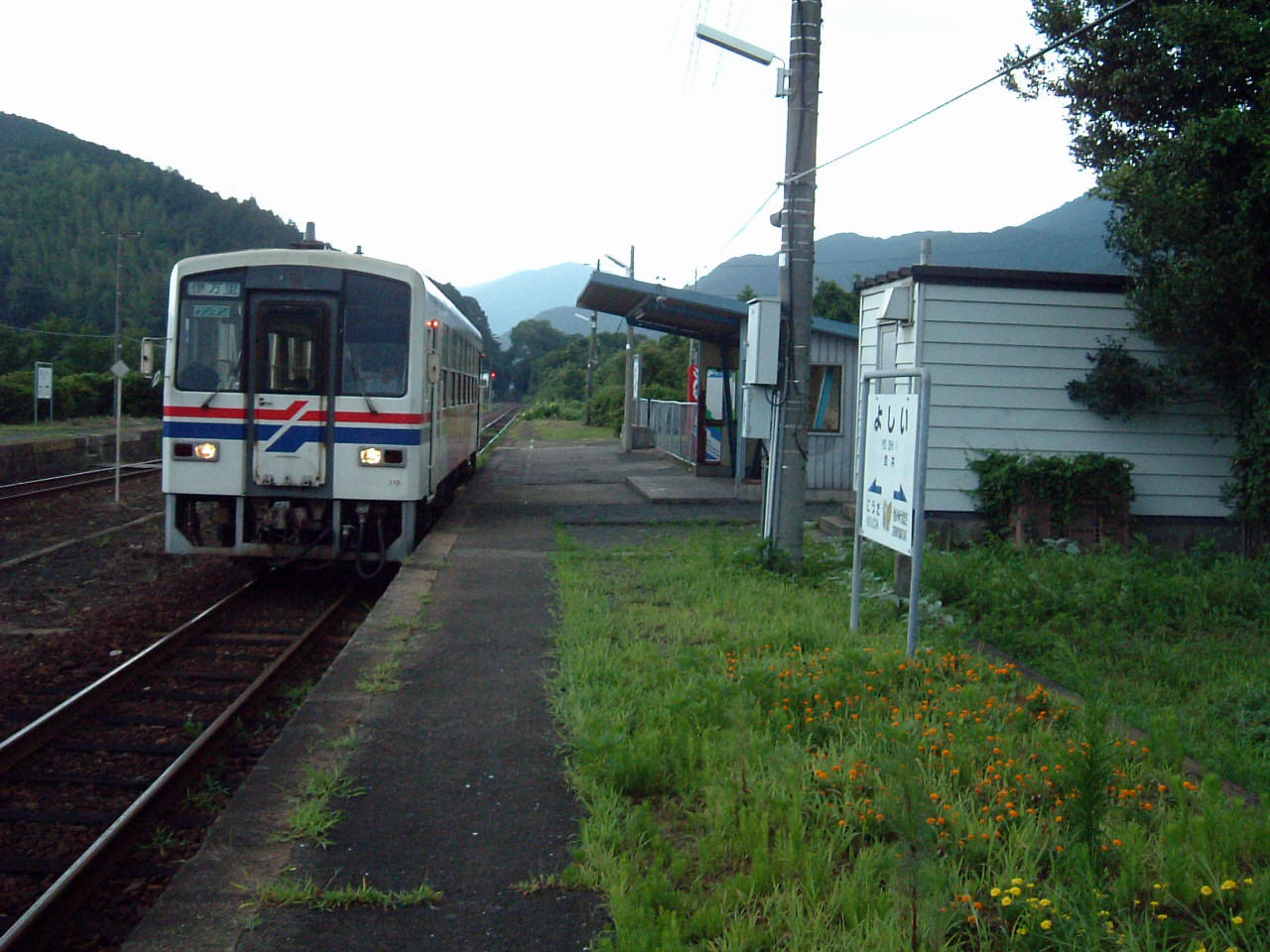

General information
- Location: Yoshii-chō Ōwatari, Sasebo, Nagasaki （佐世保市吉井町大渡） Japan
- Operator: Matsuura Railway
- Line: Nishi-Kyūshū Line

History
- Opened: 1933
- Former names: Yoshii Station; Hizen-Yoshii (until 1988)

Passengers
- 2006: 335 daily
Location

Yoshii Station (吉井駅, Yoshii-eki) is the railway station in Yoshii-chō Ōwatari, Sasebo, Nagasaki Prefecture. It is operated by Matsuura Railway and is on the Nishi-Kyūshū Line.

== Lines ==
- Matsuura Railway
  - Nishi-Kyūshū Line

== Adjacent stations ==
| ← | Service | → |
|---|---|---|
| Senryūgataki | Nishi-Kyūshū Line | Kōda |

== Station layout ==
The station is ground level with 2 platforms and 2 tracks.

== Environs ==
- National Route 204
- Shiwa Bank Yoshii Branch
- Yoshii Post Office
- Sasebo City Office Yoshii administration center

== History ==
- 24 October 1933 - Opens for business as Yoshii Station.
- 18 April 1934 - Renamed to Hizen-Yoshii Station (肥前吉井駅, Hizen-Yoshii-eki) .
- 1 April 1987 - Railways privatize and this station is inherited by JR Kyushu.
- 1 April 1988 - This station is inherited by Matsuura Railway and renamed to present name.
