= Nakazato Station =

Railway station in Sasebo, Nagasaki prefecture, Japan

Coordinates: 33°12′30″N 129°41′17″E

Nakazato Station 中里駅
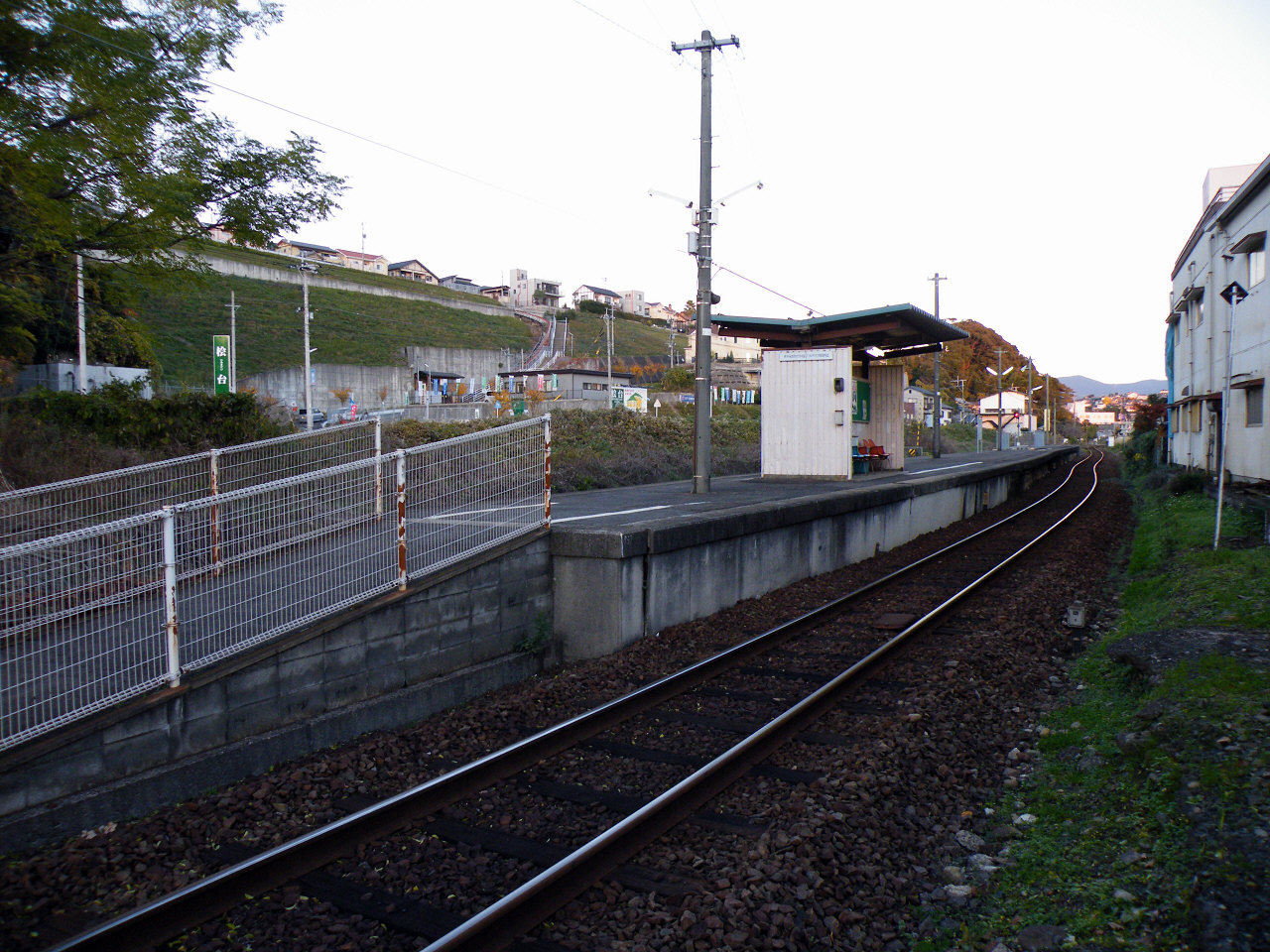

General information
- Location: Kami-Motoyama-cho, Sasebo, Nagasaki （佐世保市上本山町） Japan
- Operator: Matsuura Railway
- Line: Nishi-Kyūshū Line

History
- Opened: 1920
- Former names: Nakazato Station; Hizen-Nakazato (until 1988)

Passengers
- 2006: 167 daily
Location

Nakazato Station (中里駅, Nakazato-eki) is the railway station in Kami-Motoyama-cho, Sasebo City, Nagasaki Prefecture. It is operated by Matsuura Railway and is on the Nishi-Kyūshū Line.

== Lines ==
- Matsuura Railway
  - Nishi-Kyūshū Line

== Adjacent stations ==
←	Service	→
Nishi-Kyūshū Line
Motoyama	Local	Kaize
(Passed)	Rapid Service	(Passed)

== Station layout ==
Nakazato Station has one ground level island platform serving two tracks.

== Environs ==
- National Route 204
- Hinokidai Danchi

== History ==
- March 27, 1920 - Opens for business by Sasebo Railway as Nakazato Station.
- October 1, 1936 - The Railroad Ministry nationalizes all of Sasebo Railway, this station becomes a station of the JGR Matsuura Line and renamed to Hizen-Nakazato Station (肥前中里駅, Hizen-Nakazato-eki).
- April 1, 1987 - Railways privatize and this station is inherited by JR Kyushu.
- April 1, 1988 - This station is inherited by Matsuura Railway and Renamed to present name.
