= Senryūgataki Station =

Railway station in Sasebo, Japan

Coordinates: 33.2810°N 129.6837°E

Senryūgataki Station 潜竜ヶ滝駅
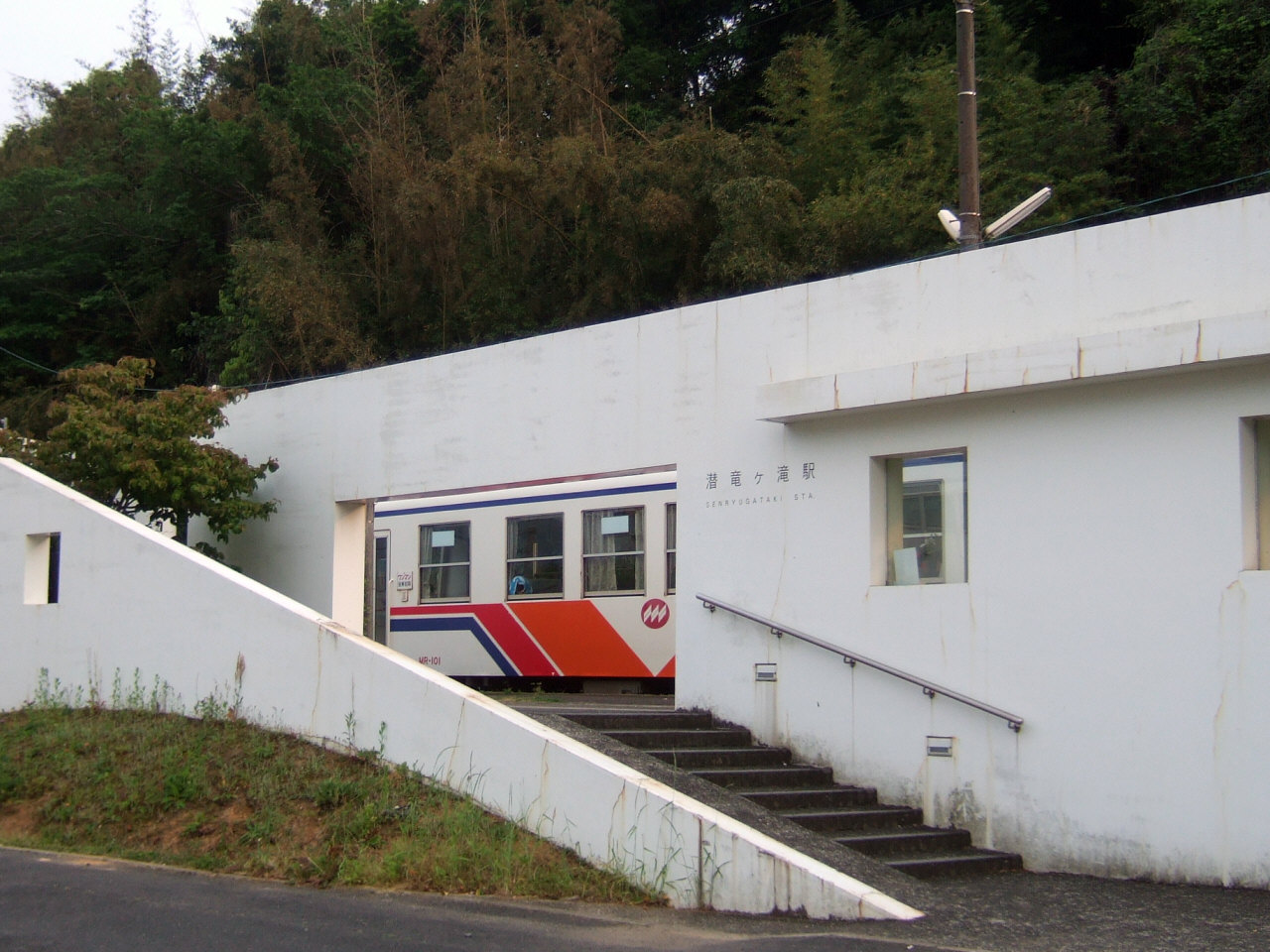

General information
- Location: Emukae-chō Tanomoto-men, Sasebo, Nagasaki （佐世保市江迎町田ノ元免） Japan
- Operator: Matsuura Railway
- Line: Nishi-Kyūshū Line

History
- Opened: 1939
- Former names: Senryū (until 1988)

Passengers
- 2005: 206 daily
Location

Senryūgataki Station (潜竜ヶ滝駅, Senryūgataki-eki) is the railway station in Emukae-chō Tanomoto-men, Sasebo, Nagasaki Prefecture. It is operated by Matsuura Railway and is on the Nishi-Kyūshū Line.

== Lines ==
- Matsuura Railway
  - Nishi-Kyūshū Line

== Adjacent stations ==
←	Service	→
Inotsuki	Nishi-Kyūshū Line	Yoshii

== Station layout ==
The station is ground level with a single side platform.

== Environs ==
- National Route 204
- Senryū Tokuda Hospital
- Inotsuki Post Office
- Emukai Town Cultural Center
- Senryūgataki Waterfall
- Fukuigawa Bridge

== History ==
- 1939-01-25 - Opens for business as JGR Senryū Station (潜竜駅, Senryū-eki) .
- 1987-04-01 - Railways privatize and this station is inherited by JR Kyushu.
- 1988-04-01 - This station is inherited by Matsuura Railway and renamed to present name.
