= Saza, Nagasaki =

Saza 佐々町
- Town
- Flag Chapter

- Location of Saza in Nagasaki Prefecture

- Location in Japan
- Coordinates: 33°14′16″N 129°39′17″E
- Country: Japan
- Region: Kyushu
- Prefecture: Nagasaki Prefecture
- District: Kitamatsuura

Area
  - Total: 32.30 km^{2} (12.47 sq mi)

Population (March 31, 2017)
  - Total: 13,825
  - Density: 428.0/km^{2} (1,109/sq mi)
- Time zone: UTC+09:00 (JST)
- Website: www.sazacho-nagasaki.jp

Saza (佐々町, Saza-chō) is a town located in Kitamatsuura District, Nagasaki Prefecture, Japan. As of March 31, 2017, the town has an estimated population of 13,825 and a density of 430 persons per km^{2}. The total area is 32.30 km^{2}.

== Transportation ==
=== Railway ===
Matsuura Railway - Nishi-Kyūshū Line

Kōda - Seihō-Koukou-Mae - Saza - Koura

=== Highway ===
Nishi-Kyūshū Expressway: Saza IC

National Route 204
