= Seihō-Koukou-Mae Station =

Train station on the Matsuura Railway line in Nagasaki Prefecture, Japan

Seihō-Koukou-Mae Station 清峰高校前駅
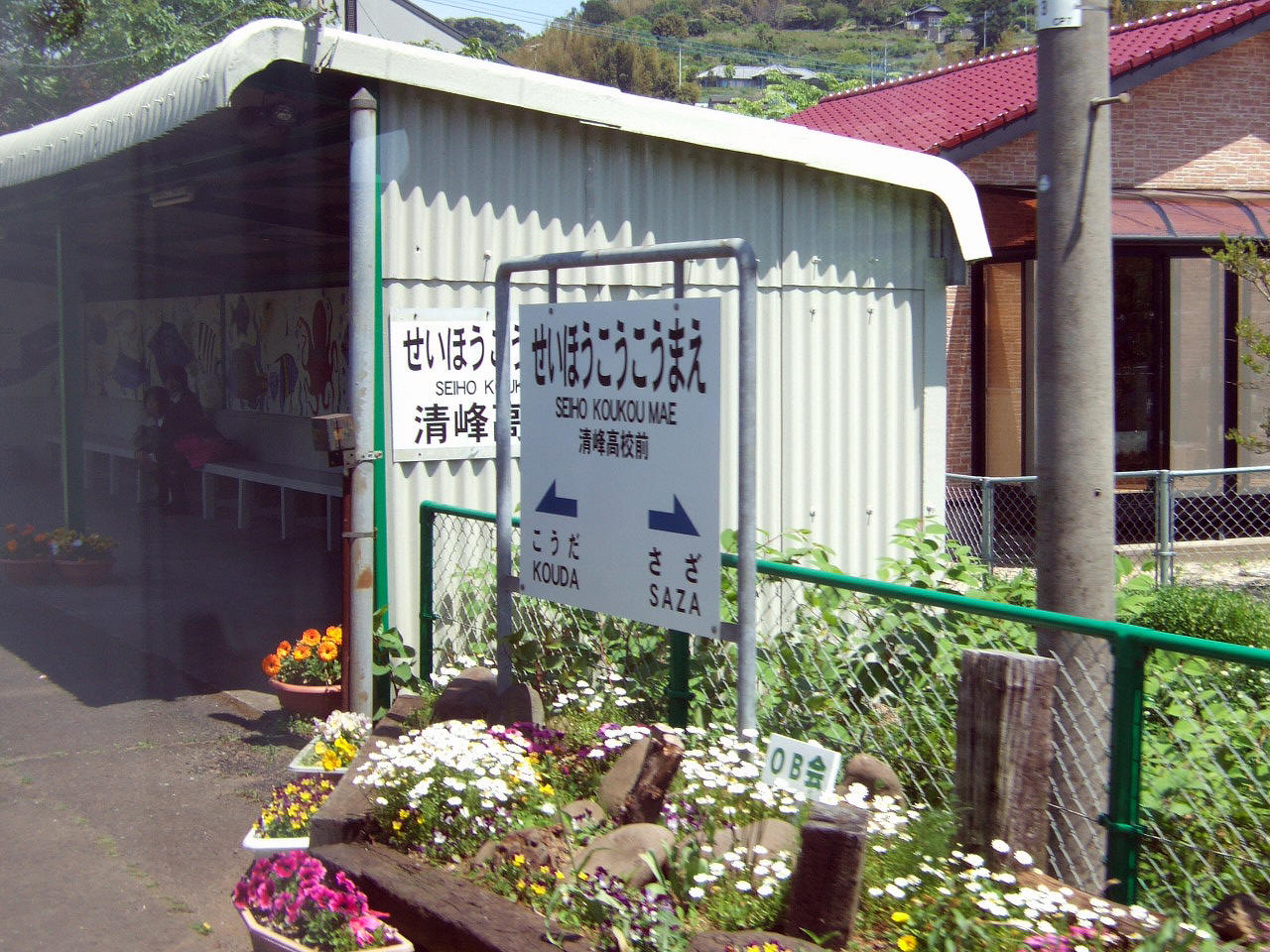
- Station building in April 2007

General information
- Location: Saza, Nagasaki Prefecture; Japan
- Coordinates: 33°14′52.32″N 129°39′24.29″E
- Operator: Matsuura Railway
- Line: ■ Nishi-Kyūshū Line
- Distance: 72.4 km from Arita Station
- Platforms: 1
- Tracks: 1

Construction
- Structure type: At-grade

Other information
- Website: Official website (in Japanese)

History
- Opened: 20 January 1959; 67 years ago
- Original company: Japanese National Railways
Location
- Location within Nagasaki Prefecture Location within Japan

Seihō-Koukou-Mae Station (清峰高校前駅, Seihō-Kōkō-Mae-eki) is a train station located in Saza, Nagasaki Prefecture, Japan. It is on the Nishi-Kyūshū Line which has been operated by the third-sector Matsuura Railway since 1988.

== Lines ==
- Matsuura Railway
  - Nishi-Kyūshū Line

Trains on this branch terminate at either Imari or Saza. Travellers can transfer at Imari for local trains to Arita, or either a local or rapid train from Saza to Sasebo. It is 72.4 km from Arita.

== Station layout ==
The station consists of one ground-level side platform with a bi-directional track.

== Adjacent stations ==
«	Service	»
Nishi-Kyūshū Line
Kōda	Local	Saza

== See also ==
- List of railway stations in Japan
