= Koura Station =

Railway station in Saza, Nagasaki prefecture, Japan

Coordinates: 33.2221°N 129.6419°E

Koura Station 小浦駅
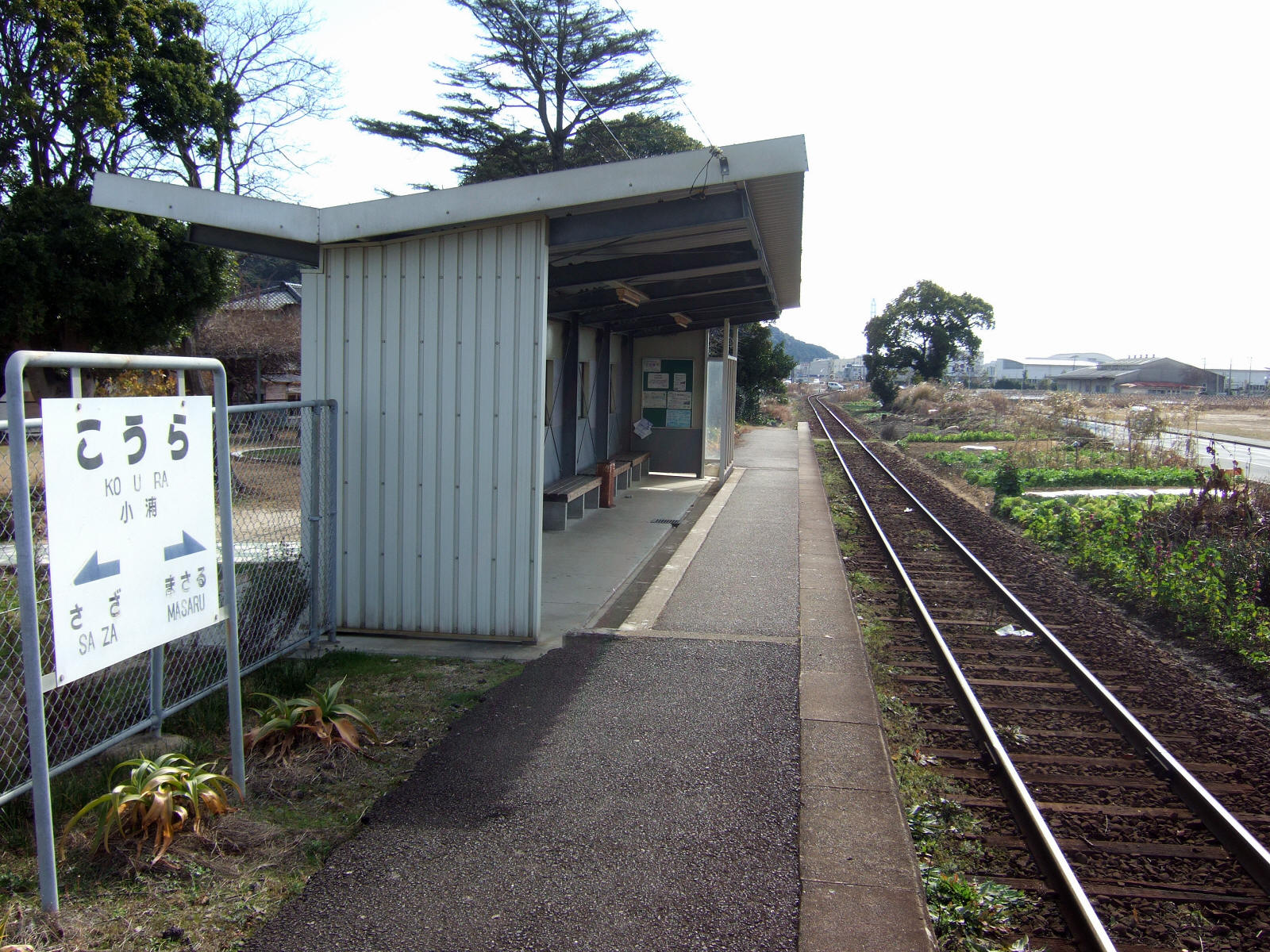

General information
- Location: Koura-men, Saza, Kitamatsuura, Nagasaki （北松浦郡佐々町小浦免） Japan
- Operator: Matsuura Railway
- Line: Nishi-Kyūshū Line

History
- Opened: 1931

Passengers
- 2005: 355 daily
Location

Koura Station (小浦駅, Koura-eki) is the railway station in Koura-men, Saza Town, Nagasaki Prefecture. It is operated by Matsuura Railway and is on the Nishi-Kyūshū Line.

== Lines ==
- Matsuura Railway
  - Nishi-Kyūshū Line

== Adjacent stations ==
←	Service	→
Nishi-Kyūshū Line
Saza	Local	Masaru
Saza	Rapid Service	Tanagata

== Station layout ==
The station is on a ground level with a single side platform.

== Environs ==
- Koura Post Office
- Sasebo Advanced Technical College
- Saihi Motor Hokubu Office
- Sun-Village Saza

== History ==
- August 29, 1931 - Opens for business by Sasebo Railway.
- October 1, 1936 - The Railroad Ministry nationalizes all of Sasebo Railway, this station becomes a station of the JGR Matsuura Line.
- March 1, 1945 - This station moved to the current position..
- April 1, 1987 - Railways privatize and this station is inherited by JR Kyushu.
- April 1, 1988 - This station is inherited by Matsuura Railway.
