= Nagasaki Junior College =

Private junior college in Sasebo, Nagasaki, Japan

Coordinates: 33°10′47″N 129°40′26″E

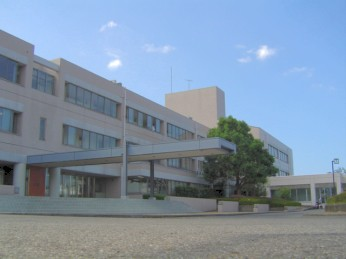
Nagasaki Junior College

Nagasaki Junior College (長崎短期大学, Nagasaki tanki daigaku) is a private junior college in Sasebo, Nagasaki, Japan, established in 1966. The predecessor of the school was founded in 1945.
