= Saza Station =

Railway station in Saza, Nagasaki prefecture, Japan

Coordinates: 33.2369°N 129.6470°E

Saza Station 佐々駅
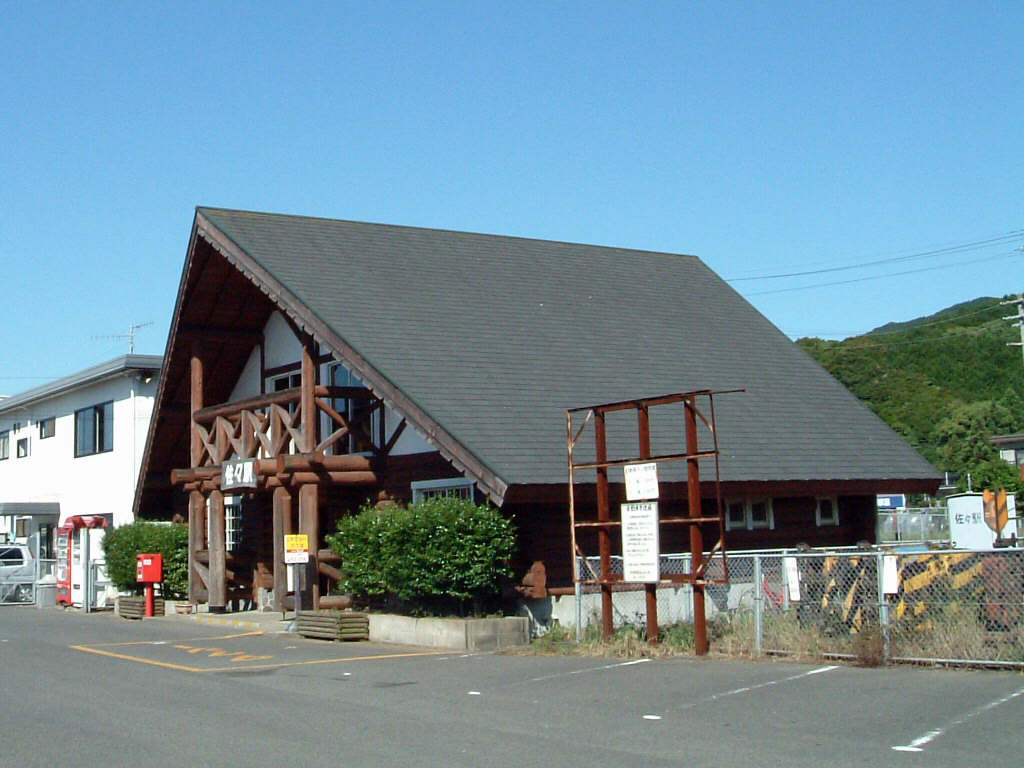

General information
- Location: Saza, Kitamatsuura, Nagasaki; Japan
- Operator: Matsuura Railway
- Line: Nishi-Kyūshū Line

History
- Opened: 1931
- Former names: Sasa (until 1936)

Passengers
- 2005: 656 daily
Location

Saza Station (佐々駅, Saza-eki) is the railway station in Hontabaru-men, Saza, Nagasaki Prefecture. It is operated by Matsuura Railway and is on the Nishi-Kyūshū Line.

== Lines ==
- Matsuura Railway
  - Nishi-Kyūshū Line

== Adjacent stations ==
←	Service	→
Matsuura Railway
Seihō-Koukou-Mae	Nishi-Kyūshū Line	Koura

== Station layout ==
The station is ground level with two platforms and three tracks.

Tracks
1	■Nishi-Kyūshū Line	To Sasebo
2	■Nishi-Kyūshū Line	To Tabira-Hiradoguchi・Matsuura・Imari
3	■Nishi-Kyūshū Line	To Sasebo

== Environs ==
This station stands near the central area of Saza Town.

- National Route 204
- Saza Bus Center
- Saza Town Office
- JP Saza Post Office
- Shinwa Bank Saza Branch

== History ==
On 27 December 1931, the station opened as Sasa Station for business as the Sasebo Railway built a branch from Yotsuyubi (later renamed Yotsuibi) on the existing line connecting the city of Sasebo and Usunoura.

On 24 October 1933, a new line was opened from Sasa to Sechibaru. This opening was actually a transfer of an existing private mining railway to the railway company.

On 1 October 1936, the Sasebo Railway was nationalized. Simultaneously, the station name was changed from Sasa to Saza, without changing the kanji script.

On 1 March 1945, the railway route was changed so that Saza became a junction of the Matsuura Line and the Usunoura Line. The operation of the Usunoura Line (Saza–Usunoura) was discontinued on 26 December 1971.

On 1 April 1987, the Japanese National Railways was privatized and this station was inherited by JR Kyushu. On 1 April 1988, this station was inherited by Matsuura Railway.
