= Tabira, Nagasaki =

Dissolved municipality in Nagasaki prefecture, Japan

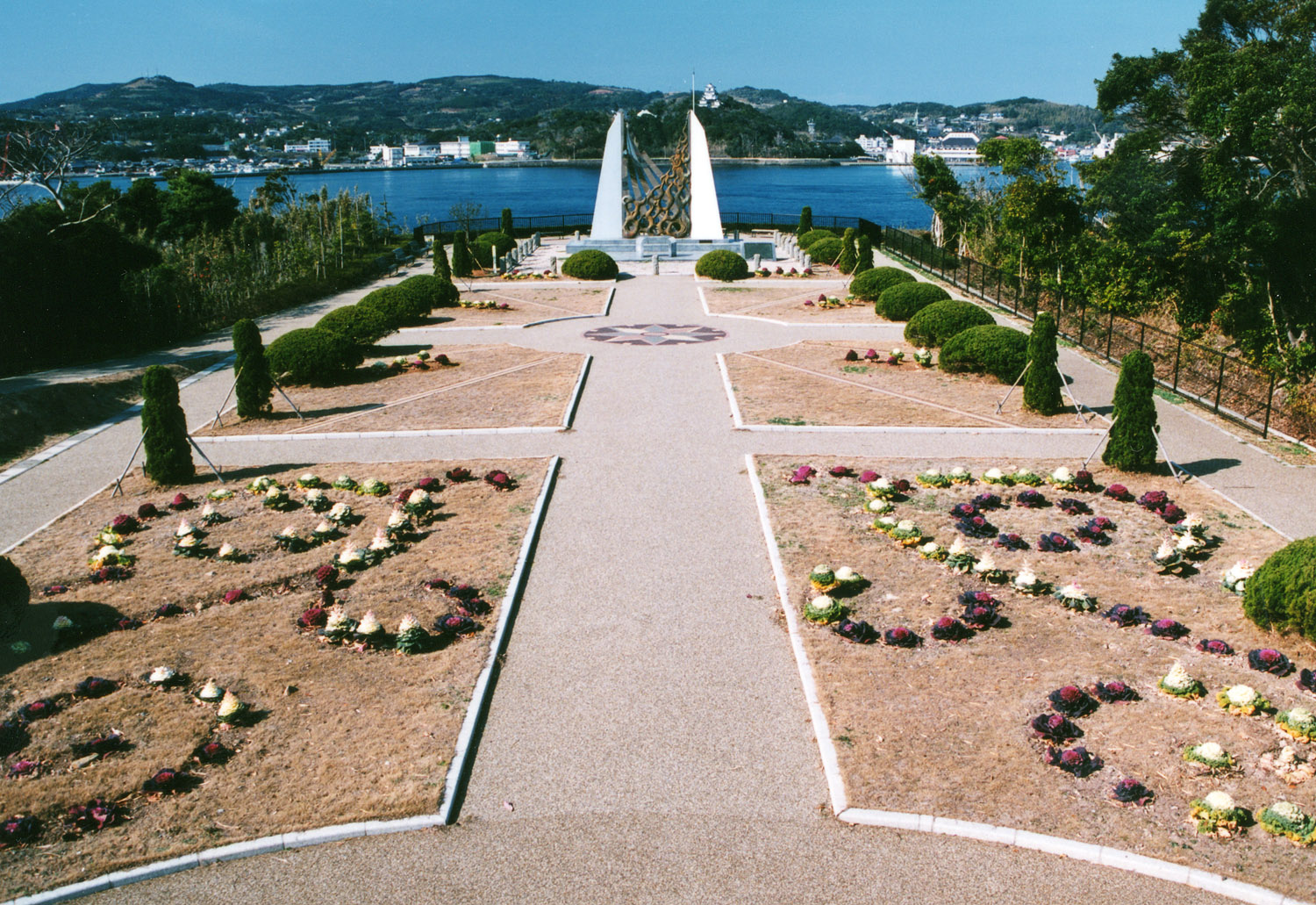
The monument to the martyr Costanzo Camillus is in the part of Hirado that was formerly the town of Tabira.

Tabira (田平町, Tabira-chō) was a town located in Kitamatsuura District, Nagasaki Prefecture, Japan.

== Population ==
As of 2003, the town had an estimated population of 7,829 and a density of 226.21 persons per km^{2}. The total area was 34.61 km^{2}.

== History ==
On October 1, 2005, Tabira, along with the town of Ikitsuki, and the village of Ōshima (all from Kitamatsuura District), was merged into the expanded city of Hirado.

=== Development ===
- April 1, 1889—The villages of Tabira and Minamitabira were established.
- April 1, 1954—The villages of Tabira and Minamitabira village were merged and incorporated as the town of Tabira.
- October 1, 2005—Dissolved and merged with Hirado, Ikitsuki, and Ōshima into the expanded city of Hirado.

== Geography ==
- Mountains: Mount Fukiage
- Islands: Yokoshima - uninhabited island off the coast of Kamata Harbor (inhabited until 1981).
- Rivers: Kubuki river
- Dams: Kubuki dam

=== Adjacent municipalities ===
- Matsuura
- Sasebo

== Administrations ==
Former Mayors

- Waseda Tsuguo (4/20/1954 - 4/19/1958)
- Kajikawa Zaiki (4/20/1958 - 4/19/1982)
- Inazawa Kenji (4/20/1982 - 4/19/1998)
- Yamasaki Yuuji (4/20/1998 - 9/30/2005)

=== Education system ===
- Tabira Kita Elementary School
- Tabira Higashi Elementary School
- Tabira minami Elementary School
- Tabira Middle School ja:平戸市立田平中学校
- Nagasaki Pref. Kitamatsuura Agricultural Senior High School ja:長崎県立北松農業高等学校

== Transportation system ==
=== Airports ===
Nearest airport within Nagasaki Prefecture is Nagasaki Airport in Ōmura.

=== Railroads ===
- Nishi-Kyūshū Line
  - Main station: Tabira-Hiradoguchi Station
  - Other stations in town: Higashi-Tabira Station - Naka-Tabira Station ja:中田平駅 - Tabira-Hiradoguchi Station - Nishi-Tabira Station

=== Highways ===
No express ways

- Nearest interchange is the Nishi-Kyūshū Expressway ja:西九州自動車道 - Ainoura Nakazato Interchange ja:相浦中里インターチェンジ.

==== Toll Roads ====
- Hirado Bridge (free of charge since April 1, 2010)

==== National Highways ====
- Japan National Route 204
  - Roadside Station: Hometown of the Insects - Tabira
- Japan National Route 383

==== Prefectural Roads ====
Nagasaki Prefectural Road 221 Iyoshi Tabira Harbor Line ja:長崎県道221号以善田平港線

== Historic sites, Sightseeing spots, Festivals ==
The town's top attraction is Tabira Insect Park. ja:たびら昆虫自然園 [1]

Other attractions include

- Satoda Historic Ruins ja:里田原遺跡
- Tabira Chapel ja:田平天主堂
- Tabira Park
- Hirado Bridge
