= Ikitsuki, Nagasaki =

Ikitsuki 生月町
- Former municipality
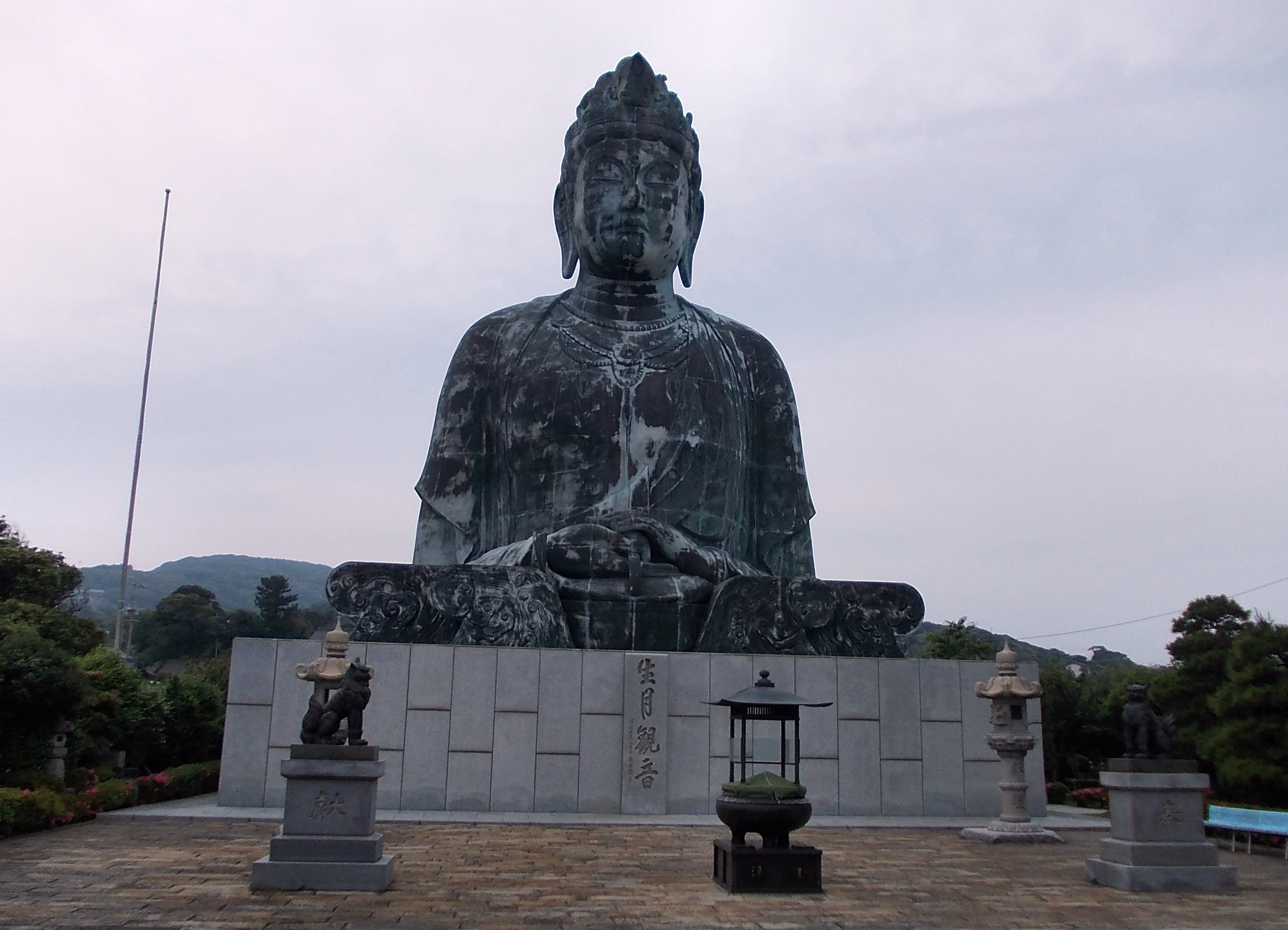
- Ikitsuki Kannon

- Location in Japan
- Coordinates: 33°23′N 129°26′E
- Country: Japan
- Region: Kyushu
- Prefecture: Nagasaki Prefecture
- District: Kitamatsuura
- Merged: October 1st, 2005 (now part of Hirado)

Area
  - Total: 16.58 km^{2} (6.40 sq mi)

Population (May 1st, 2005)
  - Total: 7,215
  - Density: 445.84/km^{2} (1,154.7/sq mi)
- Time zone: UTC+09:00 (JST)
- Website: Hirado

Ikitsuki (生月町, Ikitsuki-chō) was a town on the island of the same name located in Kitamatsuura District, Nagasaki Prefecture, Japan.

As of 2003, the town had an estimated population of 7,392 and a density of 445.84 people per km^{2}. The total area was 16.58 km^{2}.

On October 1, 2005, Ikitsuki, along with the town of Tabira and the village of Ōshima (all from Kitamatsuura District), was merged into the expanded city of Hirado.

Ikitsuki is known historically for two primary reasons: a legacy of whaling and hidden Christians. Near the south end of the island is a museum with exhibits on both these aspects of Ikitsuki's history.

Nearly all the people of Ikitsuki live on the east side of the island. The west side faces out into the open ocean (sea) and is windy. In addition, much of the west side of the island is cliff-face, with only a few spots which are flat enough even for terraced farming.

The scenery is stunning in Ikitsuki, and has attracted a great number of domestic tourists since road access was available through bridges connecting Hirado Island with the mainland and Ikitsuki Island to Hirado. The dialect of Ikitsuki can be difficult to understand, even for Japanese people who live in nearby towns. However, this is more true among the older people, and "standard" Japanese is spoken in educational and governmental settings.

== Economy ==
Ikitsuki's economy is still mainly supported by a niche fishing industry. As fishing and agriculture, in general, are in decline in Japan and other industrialized nations in the world, Ikitsuki's fishing fleet, as well as its tax base, has been declining in recent years. However, as Ikitsuki has traditionally been dependent on specialty catches, namely squid (ika), and flying fish (ago), the island has weathered Japan's shrinking fishing industry better than most other rural communities.

== Education ==
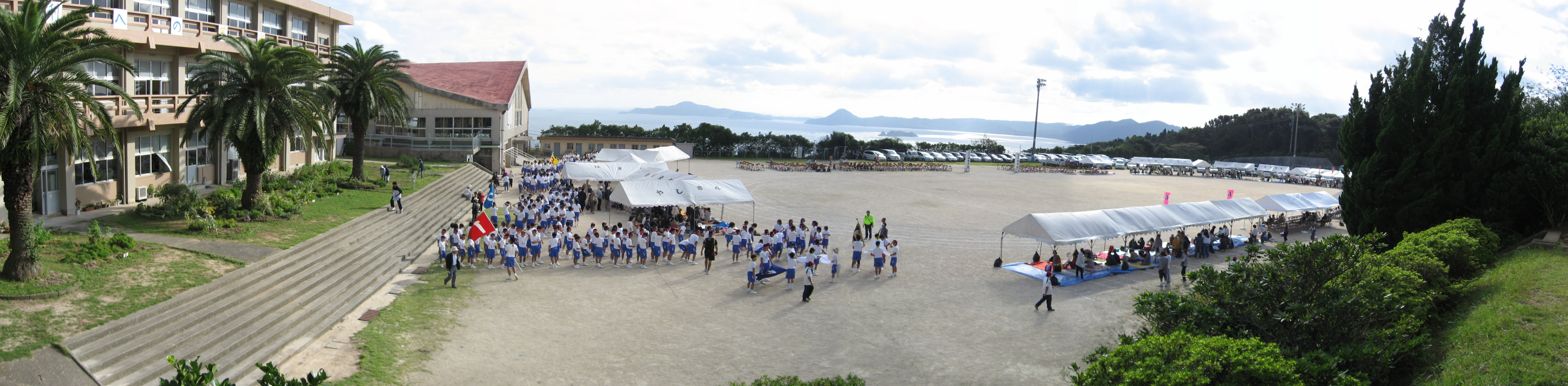
As with multiple small communities, the schools serve as a social anchor, with most residents of the island having attended Ikitsuki Junior High School.

There are two elementary schools on Ikitsuki: Ikutsuki Elementary School (生月小学校) and Yamada Elementary School (山田小学校). There is one junior high – Ikutsuki Middle School (生月中学校). There is no high school; children are required to commute off of the island. A number of them go to high schools in the surrounding communities (Hirado, Tabira, Shikamachi), while a few venture all the way to more academically rigorous high schools in Sasebo and Nagasaki, the two largest cities in Nagasaki Prefecture.

Junior High Schools

- Ikitsuki Junior High School (平戸市立生月中学校)

Elementary Schools

- Ikitsuki Elementary School (平戸市立生月小学校)
- Yamada Elementary School (平戸市立山田小学校)

== Transport ==
=== Air ===
The nearest airport is Nagasaki Airport in Ōmura City. By car, it is three hours away. Approximately the same distance away is Fukuoka Airport in Fukuoka City (Fukuoka Prefecture), which is a large regional air hub in Asia.

=== Rail ===
There are no rail links to Ikitsuki. The nearest rail station is in Tabira (now a part of Hirado), which is approximately 40 minutes away by car.

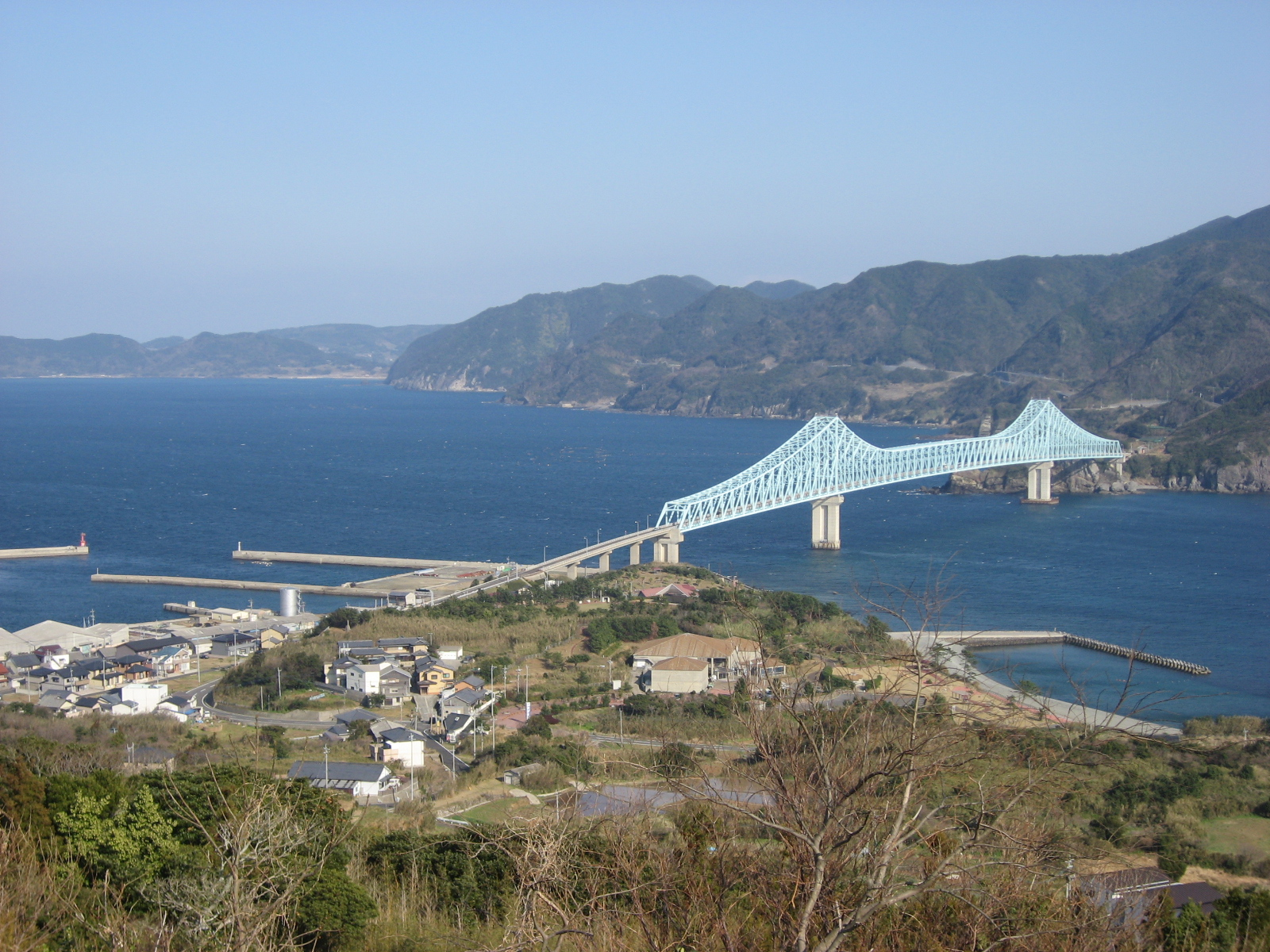
Ikitsuki Bridge, connecting Ikitsuki to the neighboring island of Hirado

=== Automobile ===
The Ikitsuki bridge allows automobile access from Ikitsuki to Hirado and the rest of Japan. Previously, the only option to travel off the island was by ferry to various ports in Kyūshū. Since the merger of Ikitsuki into Hirado City, tolls on the bridge have significantly decreased. Before October 1, 2005, tolls were 450 yen one way for a yellow plate car (small) and 600 yen for a white plate (large). This has since decreased threefold to 150 yen one way for yellow plate cars, and 200 yen for white plate cars. From April 1, 2010, no fee is required to pass the Ikitsuki Bridge.

Access to mainland Kyūshū is through a separate bridge on Hirado Island. It takes about 30 minutes to drive from Ikitsuki to Hirado.

The bridge connecting Ikitsuki to the neighboring Hirado Island is the longest continuous truss bridge in the world, measuring in at 1312 ft (400 meters).

==== Principal roads ====
- Nagasaki Prefectural Highway 42: Hirado-Ikitsuki Line
- Ikitsuki Bridge Toll Road (大橋生月)

== Places of interest ==
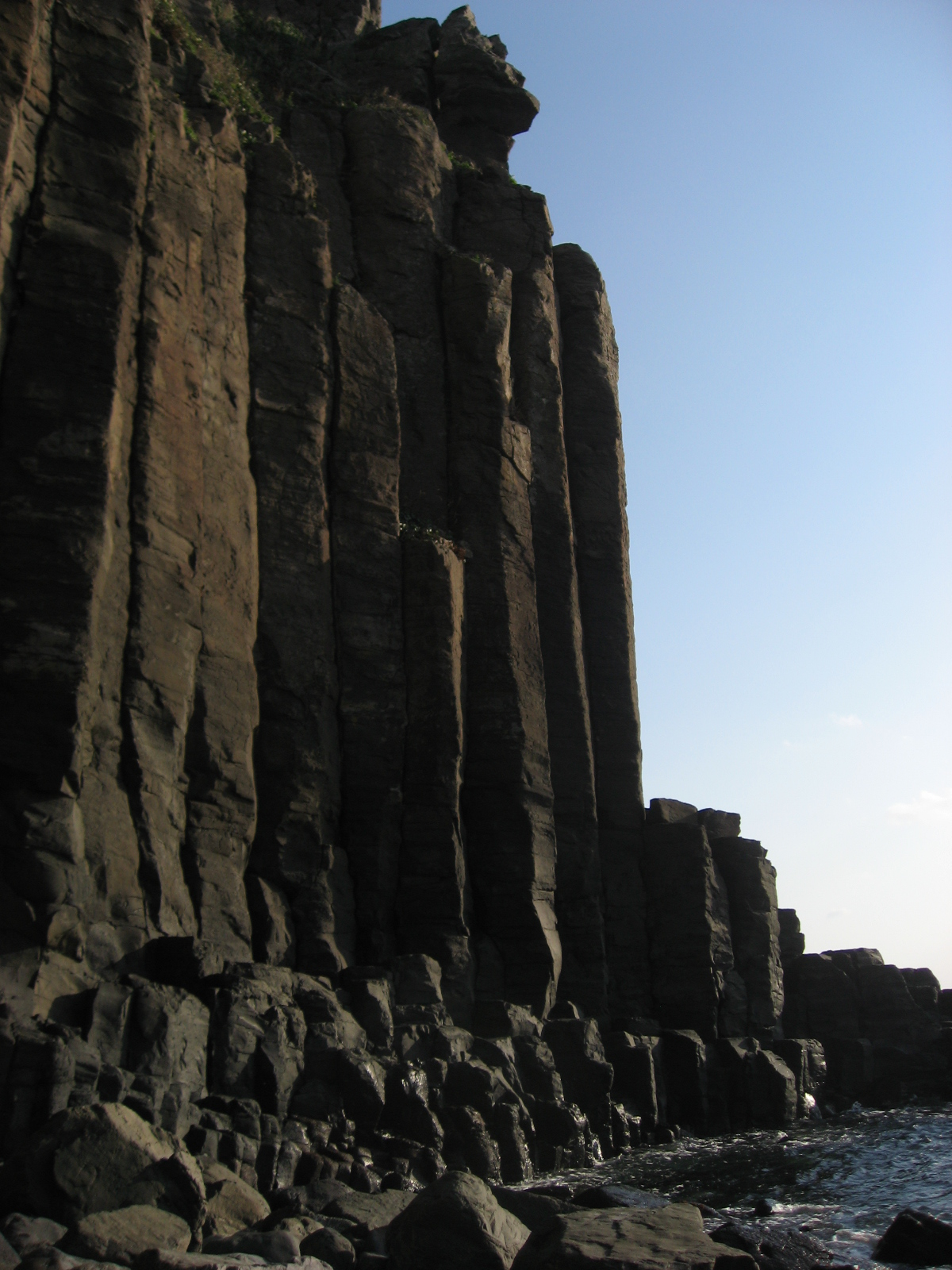
Cliffs on the western side of Ikitsuki, part of Saikai National Park

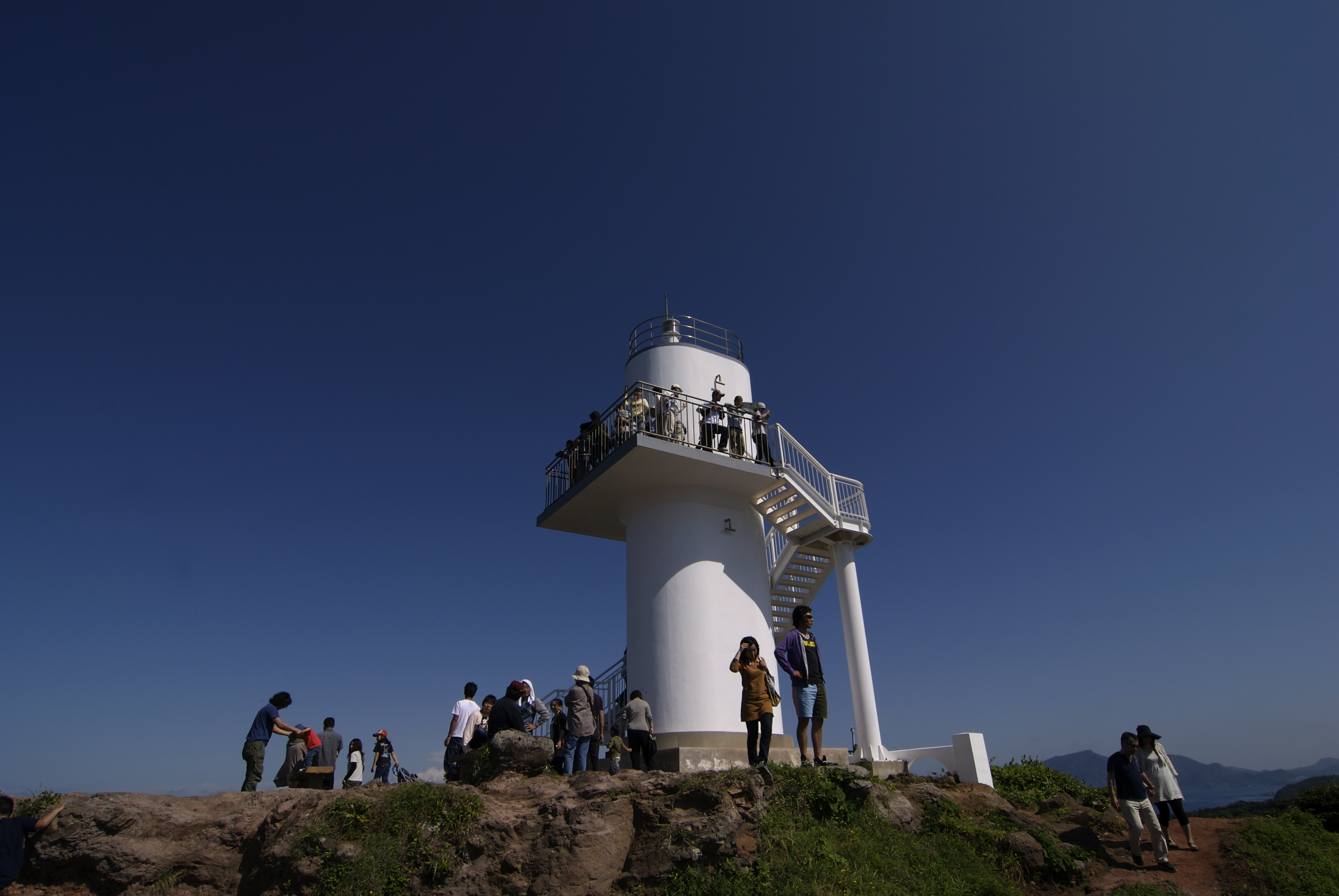
Ōbae Lighthouse, located at the northern tip of Ikitsuki Island

=== Ikitsuki Island Museum ===
This museum, near the bridge connecting Hirado and Ikitsuki, prominently displays the history of Ikitsuki Island. Featured are legacies of the old whaling industry, as well as the presence of hidden Christians. A full whale skeleton is on display in the main atrium, as well as other artifacts from Ikitsuki's history. Other odds and ends include a famous sumo wrestler from the island. The gift shop features canned whale and whale hotdogs among its items. Admission is 500 yen, and the museum is open daily.

=== Ikitsuki Daigyoran Kannon Statue ===
The Ikitsuki Daigyoran Kannon Statue is the largest bronze statue in Japan. The massive statue, completed on April 29, 1980, is 18 meters tall and weights 150 metric tons. It rests on a 3-meter stone foundation, inside of which one can find a Buddhist altar.

"In Japanese Buddhism, Kannon is the Bodhisattva of compassion, and is therefore different from a Buddha as depicted by the famous bronze statues in Nara and Kamakura. The Ikitsuki Daigyoran Kannon prays for world peace and the safety of those that are out on the sea. It also mourns over all shipwrecked people and marine animals."

=== Yamada Church ===
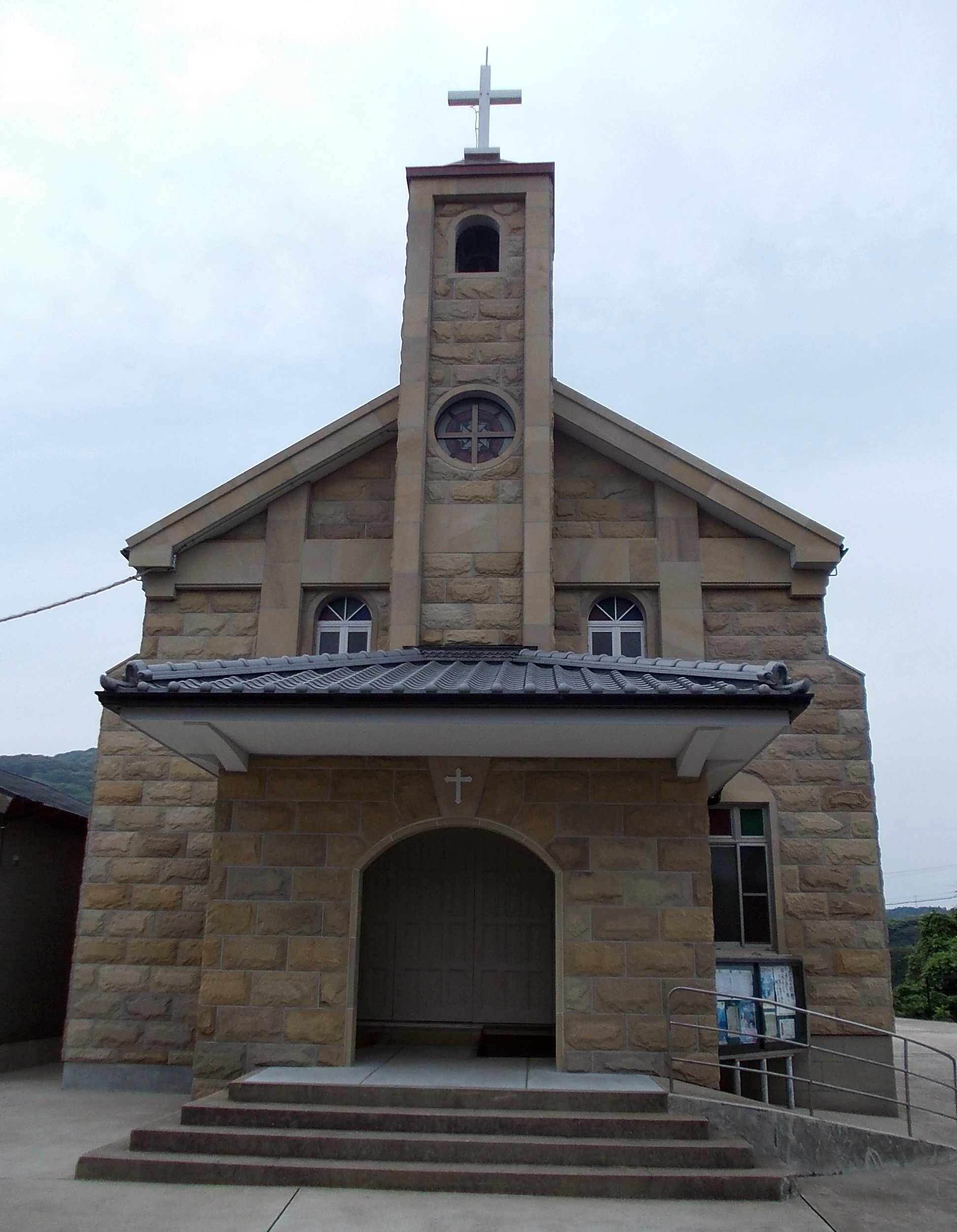
Yamada Church

This church is the last remaining one in Nagasaki Prefecture to have an organized group of Hidden Christians (Kakure Kirishitan) in practice and existence. Located near Yamada Elementary School, this small church holds much history as one of the first and last outposts of Christian belief and persecution in Japan.

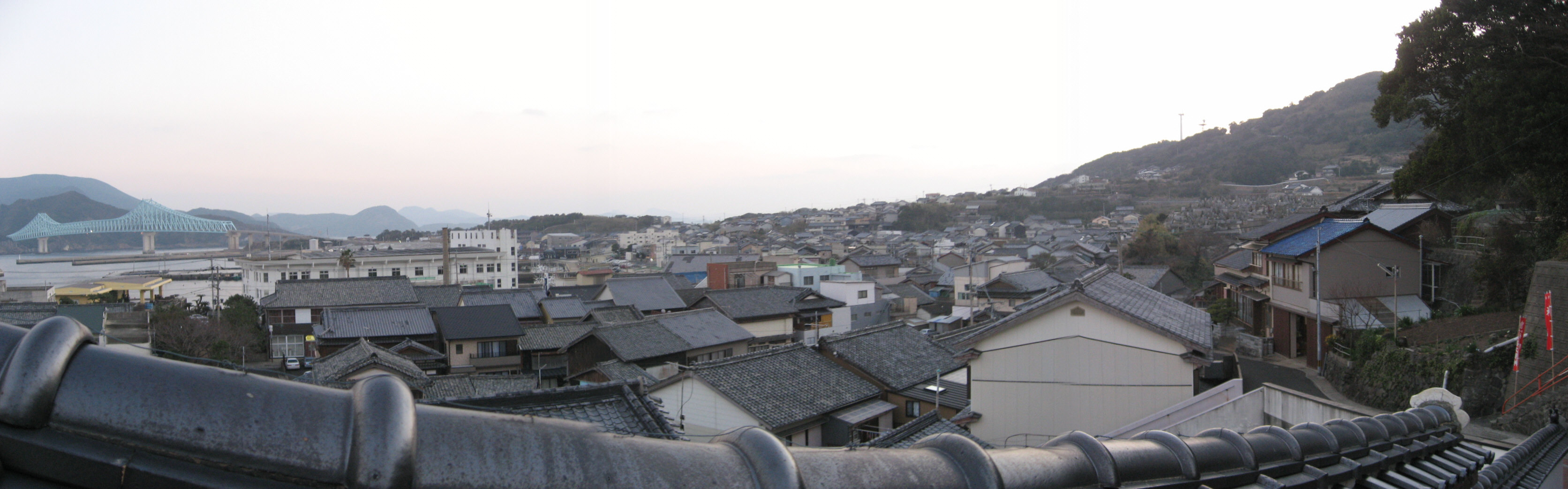
Though Ikitsuki is sparsely populated overall, due to mountainous terrain, most residents live in two areas of the island. This is the smaller of the two and near Ikitsuki Bridge, which can be seen in the background.

== People from Ikitsuki ==
- Takanowaka, one of the top hundred sumo wrestlers in Japan, was born and raised in Ikitsuki. He visits the island annually after competing in the Grand Sumo tournament in Fukuoka City each November.
- Genjirō Kaneko, politician and member of the Liberal Democratic Party, former Minister of Agriculture, Forestry and Fisheries.

== Sister city ==
Ikitsuki is sister cities with the town of Utanobori in Hokkaidō, Japan. Both towns of are similar size and participate in student exchanges at the junior high school level.
