= Takashima Kōzaki Site =

- 鷹島神崎遺跡 (Japanese)
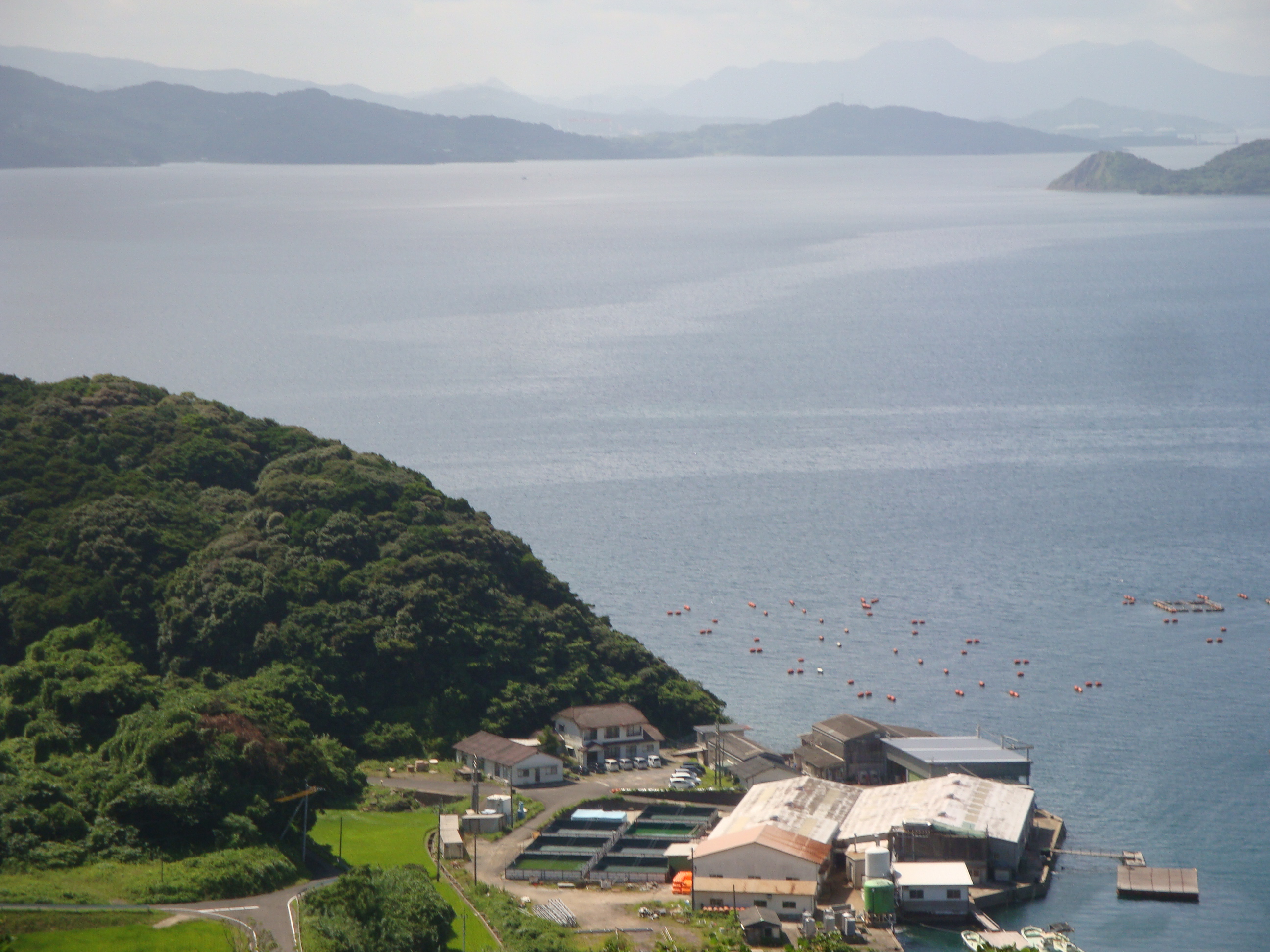
- Takashima Kōzaki Site

- Takashima Kōzaki Site Takashima Kōzaki Site (Japan)
- Interactive map of Takashima Kōzaki Site
- 33°25′37″N 129°46′20″E
- Type: battlefield
- Periods: Kamakura period
- Location: Matsuura, Nagasaki, Japan
- Region: Kyushu

Site notes
- Public access: No

The Takashima Kōzaki Site (鷹島神崎遺跡, Takashima kōzaki iseki) is an underwater archaeological site containing artifacts from the Kamakura period Mongol invasions of Japan located offshore the east coast of the island of Takashima in the city of Matsuura, Nagasaki Prefecture Japan. The 384,000 square meter area of the seabed was designated a National Historic Site of Japan in 2012, and is the first underwater site so designated in Japan.

== Overview ==
Major military efforts were taken by Kublai Khan of the Yuan dynasty in 1274 and 1281 to conquer the Japanese archipelago. The island of Takashima at the mouth of Imari Bay between Kita-Matsuura Peninsula and Higashi-Matsuura Peninsula and its surrounding areas was one of the main battlefields during first invasion in 1274, and the site where much of the Mongold fleet was destroyed by a typhoon in 1281.

Fishermen in this area often reported recovering vases, lacquerware, arrows, swords, helmets, and other weapons and armor, anchor stones, and other artifacts. Archaeological excavations led by Ryukyu University have been conducted here since 1980. In addition to weapons and ceramics, ship parts such as a keel from a Mongol warship approximately 12 meters long have been found on the seabed, from which the size of the ship could be estimated to have been around 20-meters. Many of the artifacts found are kept at the Matsuura City Takashima History and Folk Museum.

== See also ==
- List of Historic Sites of Japan (Nagasaki)
