= Ōshima, Nagasaki =

Ōshima, Nagasaki may refer to:

- Ōshima, Nagasaki (Kitamatsuura), former village, now part of Hirado, Nagasaki
- Ōshima, Nagasaki (Nishisonogi), former town, now part of Saikai, Nagasaki
