= Takashima, Nagasaki (Kitamatsuura) =

Dissolved municipality in Nagasaki prefecture, Japan

Coordinates: 33.434056°N 129.755889°E

Takashima (鷹島町, Takashima-chō) was a town located in Kitamatsuura District, Nagasaki Prefecture, Japan.

As of 2003, the town had an estimated population of 2,763 and a density of 161.39 persons per km^{2}. The total area was 17.12 km^{2}. As of 2025, the population decreased to 1,622.

On January 1, 2006, Takashima, along with the town of Fukushima (also from Kitamatsuura District), was merged into the expanded city of Matsuura.

Technically an island, Takashima is linked to mainland Kyūshū by Takashima-Hizen Ohashi Bridge, which was completed in 2009.

== Transport ==
=== Air transport ===
There is no airport on the island. The nearby airports are Fukuoka Airport and Saga Airport both of which are about 1.5-2 hours away by driving.

=== Rail transport ===
There is no railway on the island. The nearby rail stations are Karatsu Station (Kyushu Railway Company) and Takashimaguchi Station (Matsuura Railway).

== Role in 1281 Mongol Invasion ==
Takashima is known as a key site in the second Mongol invasion of Japan in 1281. Specifically, the invading Yuan dynasty ships were anchored near Takashima when the "kamikaze" typhoon hit that sunk most of the fleet. Estimates of the number of ships sunk vary from 400 to 4000. The Kōzaki Site just offshore is a key archaeological site for studying the ships that sank during the 1281 typhoon, and many of the artifacts found there can be viewed at the Matsuura City Center for Archaeological Cultural Properties on Takashima. Takashima also hosts a Mongol-themed park, the Takashima Mongol Village, at its northern end.
