= Maehama Station =

Train station on the Matsuura Railway line in Nagasaki Prefecture, Japan

Maehama Station 前浜駅
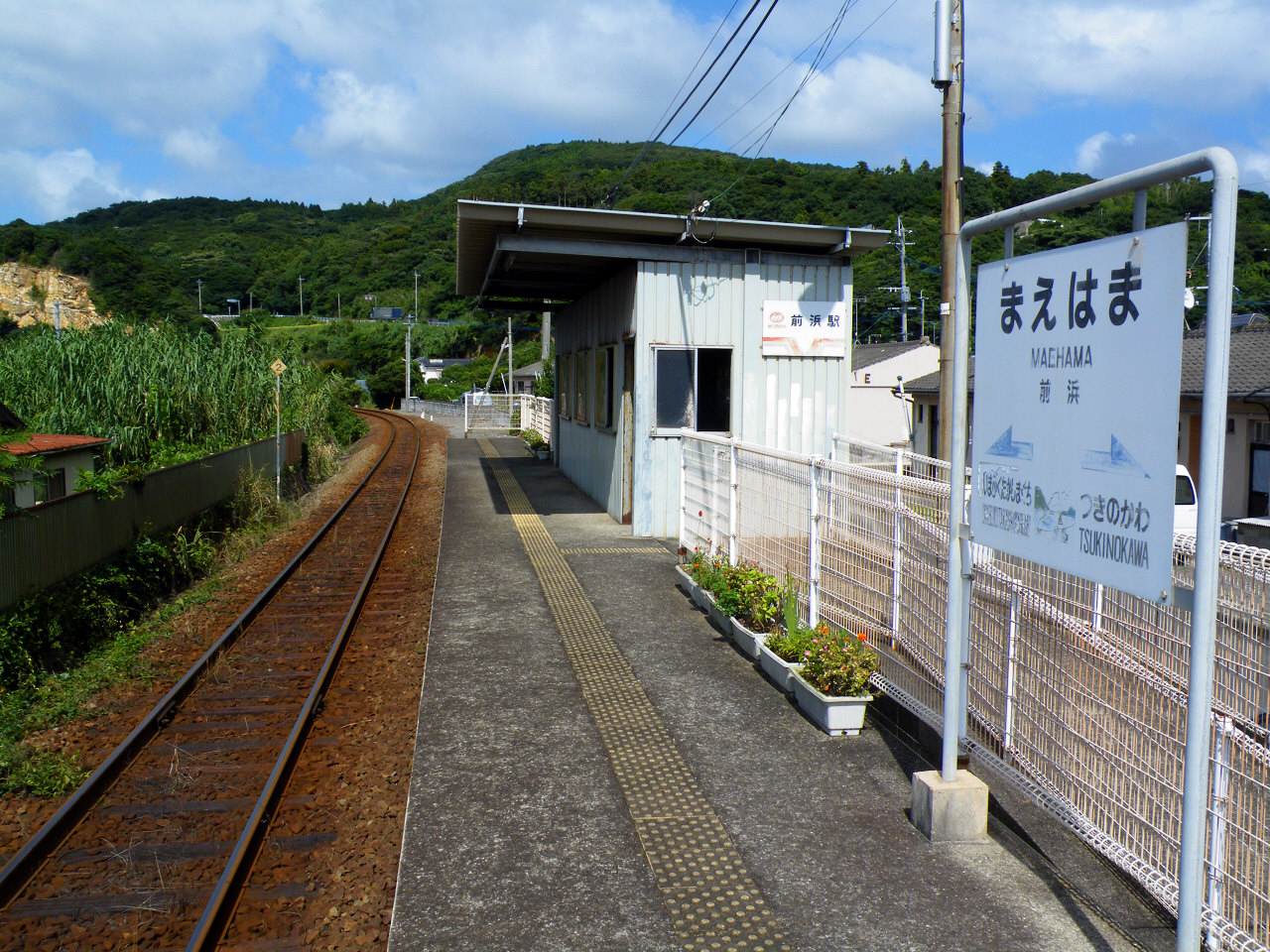
- Station platform in August 2008

General information
- Location: Matsuura, Nagasaki Prefecture; Japan
- Coordinates: 33°21′30.79″N 129°44′9.35″E
- Operator: Matsuura Railway
- Line: ■ Nishi-Kyūshū Line
- Distance: 32.4 km from Arita Station
- Platforms: 1
- Tracks: 1

Construction
- Structure type: At-grade

Other information
- Website: Official website (in Japanese)

History
- Opened: 10 March 1990; 36 years ago
- Original company: Matsuura Railway
Location
- Location within Nagasaki Prefecture Location within Japan

Maehama Station (前浜駅, Maehama-eki; まえはまえき) is a train station located in Matsuura, Nagasaki Prefecture, Japan. It is on the Nishi-Kyūshū Line which has been operated by the third-sector Matsuura Railway since 1988.

== Lines ==
- Matsuura Railway
  - Nishi-Kyūshū Line

Trains on this branch terminate at either Imari or Saza. Travellers can transfer at Imari for local trains to Arita, or either a local or rapid train from Saza to Sasebo. It is 32.4 km from Arita.

== Station layout ==
The station consists of one ground-level side platform with a bi-directional track.

== Adjacent stations ==
«	Service	»
Nishi-Kyūshū Line
Takashimaguchi	Local	Tsukinokawa

== See also ==
- List of railway stations in Japan
