= Uku, Nagasaki =

Dissolved municipality in Kitamatsuura district, Nagasaki prefecture, Japan

Coordinates: 33.255°N 129.138°E

Uku (宇久町, Uku-machi) was a town located in Kitamatsuura District, Nagasaki Prefecture, Japan. It encompasses the entirety of Ukujima island.

As of 2003, the town had an estimated population of 3,560 and a density of 134.85 persons per km^{2}. The total area was 26.40 km^{2}.

On March 31, 2006, Uku, along with the town of Kosaza (also from Kitamatsuura District), was merged into the expanded city of Sasebo.

Uku can be accessed by ferry from Fukuoka's Hakata port as well as a number of ferries departing from Sasebo ferry port daily.
