= Fukushima, Nagasaki =

Dissolved municipality in Nagasaki prefecture, Japan

Fukushima (福島町, Fukushima-chō) was a town located in Kitamatsuura District, Nagasaki Prefecture, Japan.

As of 2003, the town had an estimated population of 3,255 and a density of 188.59 persons per km^{2}. The total area was 17.26 km^{2}.

On January 1, 2006, Fukushima, along with the town of Takashima (also from Kitamatsuura District), was merged into the expanded city of Matsuura.

The town of Fukushima used the Camellia flower as its town symbol. Fukushima was known locally for a seasonally available variety of large shrimp and for a number of scenic vistas popular among photographers. Technically an island, Fukushima is linked to mainland Kyūshū by a bridge.
