= Kitamatsuura District, Nagasaki =

District in Nagasaki prefecture, Japan

Coordinates: 33.232°N 129.66°E

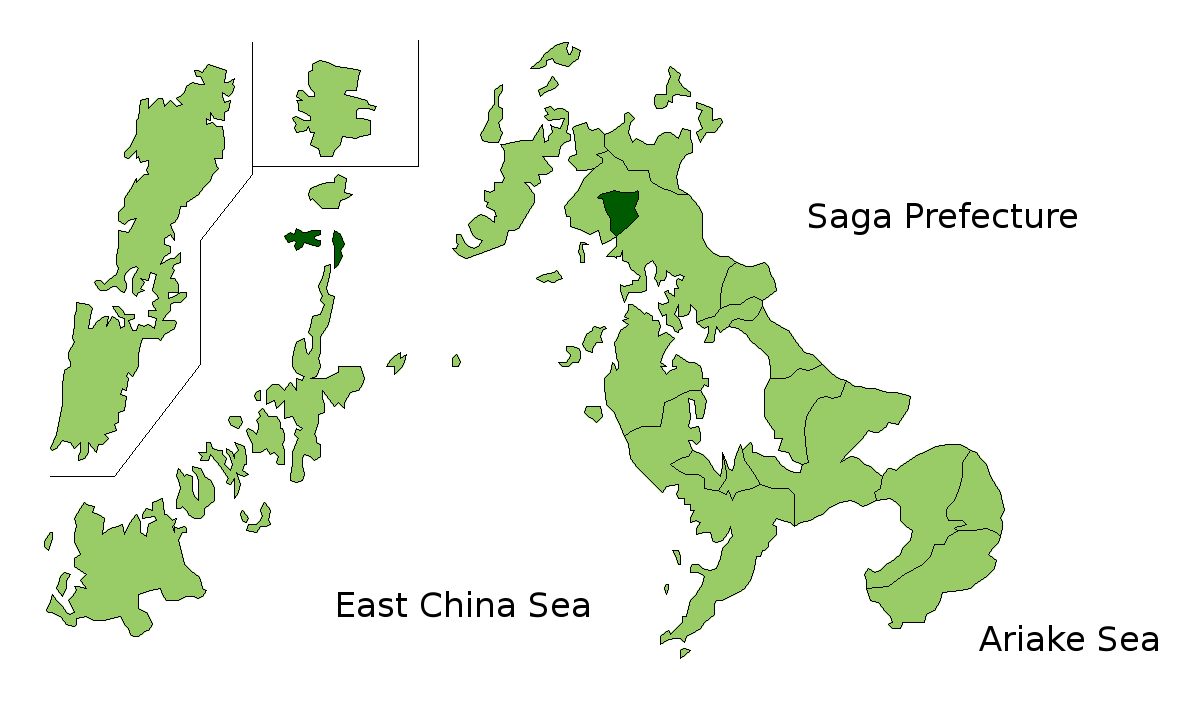
Kitamatsuura District in Nagasaki Prefecture

Kitamatsuura (北松浦郡, Kitamatsuura-gun) is a district located in Nagasaki Prefecture, Japan.

As of August 1, 2011, the district has an estimated population of 16,270 and a density of 282 persons per km^{2}. The total area is 57.76 km^{2}.

== Towns and villages ==
- Ojika
- Saza

== Mergers ==
- On April 1, 2005, the towns of Sechibaru and Yoshii merged into the city of Sasebo.
- On October 1, 2005, the towns of Ikitsuki and Tabira, and the village of Ōshima merged into the city of Hirado.
- On January 1, 2006, the towns of Fukushima and Takashima merged into the city of Matsuura.
- On March 31, 2006, the towns of Kosaza and Uku merged into the city of Sasebo.
- On March 31, 2010, the towns of Emukae and Shikamachi merged into the city of Sasebo.
