= Emukae, Nagasaki =

Former town in Nagasaki Prefecture, Japan

Coordinates: 33°18′N 129°39′E

Location of Emukae in Nagasaki Prefecture

Emukae (江迎町, Emukae-chō) was a town located in Kitamatsuura District, Nagasaki Prefecture, Japan.

On January 1, 2009, the town had an estimated population of 6,849 and a population density of 182.00 per square kilometre (471.4/sq mi). The total area was 32.07 square kilometres (12.38 sq mi).

On March 31, 2010, Emukae, along with the town of Shikamachi (also from Kitamatsuura District), was merged into the expanded city of Sasebo.

Emukae is most famous for its annual Sentoro Festival, which features a giant triangular frame bearing one thousand red lanterns. It is also the site of Senryugataki (Senryu Waterfall).

Sentoro festival's giant lantern tower

The town has two pre-schools, a kindergarten, two elementary schools and one junior high school (middle school). It is approximately one hour's drive from the city hall of Sasebo, two hours from Nagasaki and about three hours from Fukuoka.
