= Matsuura Station =

Railway station in Matsuura, Japan

Coordinates: 33.3445°N 129.7077°E

Matsuura Station 松浦駅
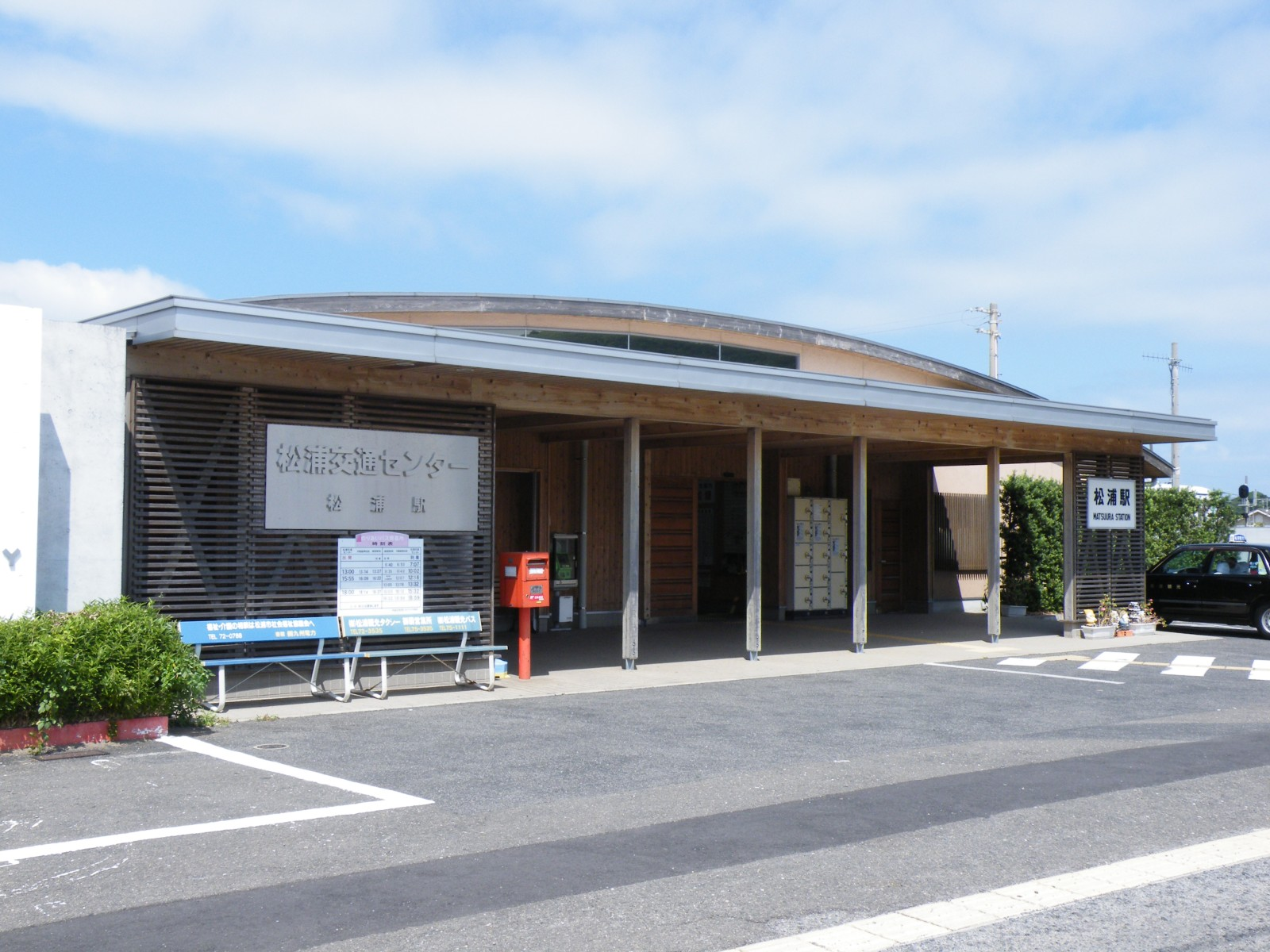

General information
- Location: Matsuura, Nagasaki; Japan
- Operator: Matsuura Railway
- Line: Nishi-Kyūshū Line

History
- Opened: 1933
- Former names: Shisa (until 1959)

Passengers
- 2005: 716 daily
Location

Matsuura Station (松浦駅, Matsuura-eki) is the railway station in Shisa-cho Ura-men, Matsuura, Nagasaki Prefecture.It is operated by Matsuura Railway and is on the Nishi-Kyūshū Line.

== Lines ==
- Matsuura Railway
  - Nishi-Kyūshū Line

== Adjacent stations ==
| ← | Service | → |
|---|---|---|
Matsuura Railway
| Tsukinokawa | Nishi-Kyushu Line | Matsuura Hatsudensho-mae |

== Station layout ==
The station is ground level with 2 platforms and 3 tracks.

Tracks
| 1 | ■Nishi-Kyūshū Line | To Tabira-Hiradoguchi・Saza・Sasebo |
| 2 | ■Nishi-Kyūshū Line | To Imari |
| 3 | ■Nishi-Kyūshū Line | To Imari |

== Environs ==
- National Route 204
- Matsuura Bus Center (Saihi Motor)
- Matsuura City Office
- Matsuura High School
- Matsuura Municipal Matsuura Junior High School
- Best Denki Matsuura-Shisa Branch

== History ==
- 25 June 1933 - Opens for business as Shisa Station (志佐駅, Shisa-eki).
- 1 October 1959 - This station is renamed to present name.
- 1 April 1987 - Railways privatize and this station is inherited by JR Kyushu.
- 1 April 1988 - This station is inherited by Matsuura Railway.
