= Tabira-Hiradoguchi Station =

Railway station in Hirado, Japan

Coordinates: 33°21′45″N 129°34′57″E

Tabira-Hiradoguchi Station たびら平戸口駅
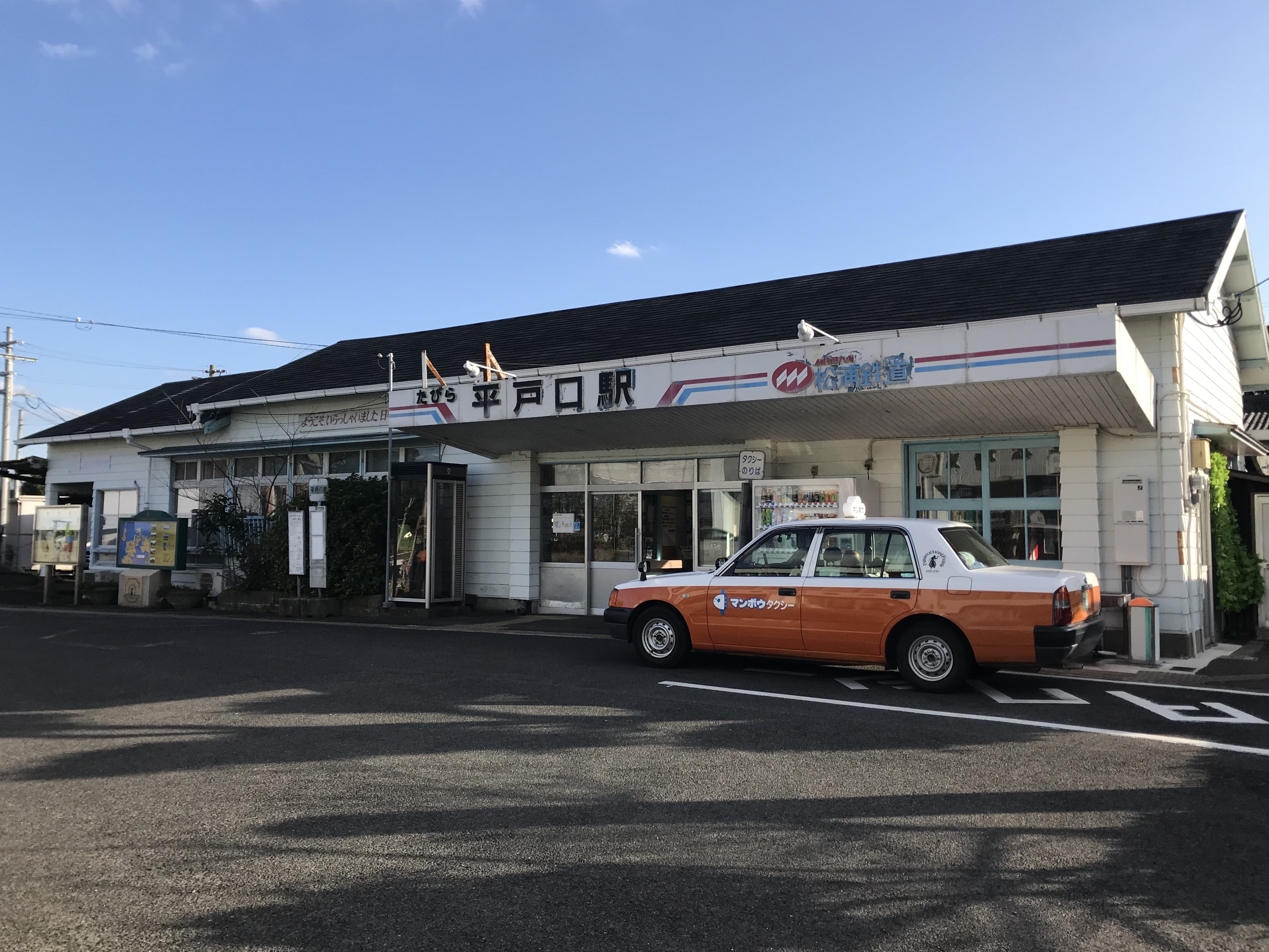
- Tabira-Hiradoguchi Station in January 2019

General information
- Location: Tabira-chō Yamanouchi-men, Hirado-shi, Nagasaki-ken; Japan
- Operator: Matsuura Railway
- Line: Nishi-Kyūshū Line

History
- Opened: 6 August 1935
- Former names: Hiradoguchi (until 1989)

Passengers
- FY2005: 302 daily
Location
- Location within Japan

Tabira-Hiradoguchi Station (たびら平戸口駅, Tabira-Hiradoguchi-eki) is the railway station in Tabira-chō Yamanouchi-men, Hirado, Nagasaki Prefecture. It is operated by Matsuura Railway and is on the Nishi-Kyūshū Line.

This station is the westernmost non-monorail railway station in Japan.

== Lines ==
- Matsuura Railway
  - Nishi-Kyūshū Line

== Adjacent stations ==
| ← | Service | → |
|---|---|---|
| Naka-Tabira | Nishi-Kyushu Line | Nishi-Tabira |

== Station layout ==
The station is ground level with 2 platforms and 3 tracks.

Tracks
| 1 | ■Nishi-Kyūshū Line | To Matsuura・Imari |
| 2 | ■Nishi-Kyūshū Line | To Imari・Sasebo |
| 3 | ■Nishi-Kyūshū Line | To Saza・Sasebo |

== Surrounding area ==
- National Route 204
- Hirado City Office Tabira Branch
- Hirado Bridge
- Tabira post office
- Shinwa Bank Tabira Branch

== History ==
- August 6, 1935 - Opens for business as Hiradoguchi Station.
- April 1, 1987 - Railways privatize and this station is inherited by JR Kyushu.
- April 1, 1988 - This station is inherited by Matsuura Railway.
- March 11, 1989 - This Station is renamed Tabira-Hiradoguchi Station.
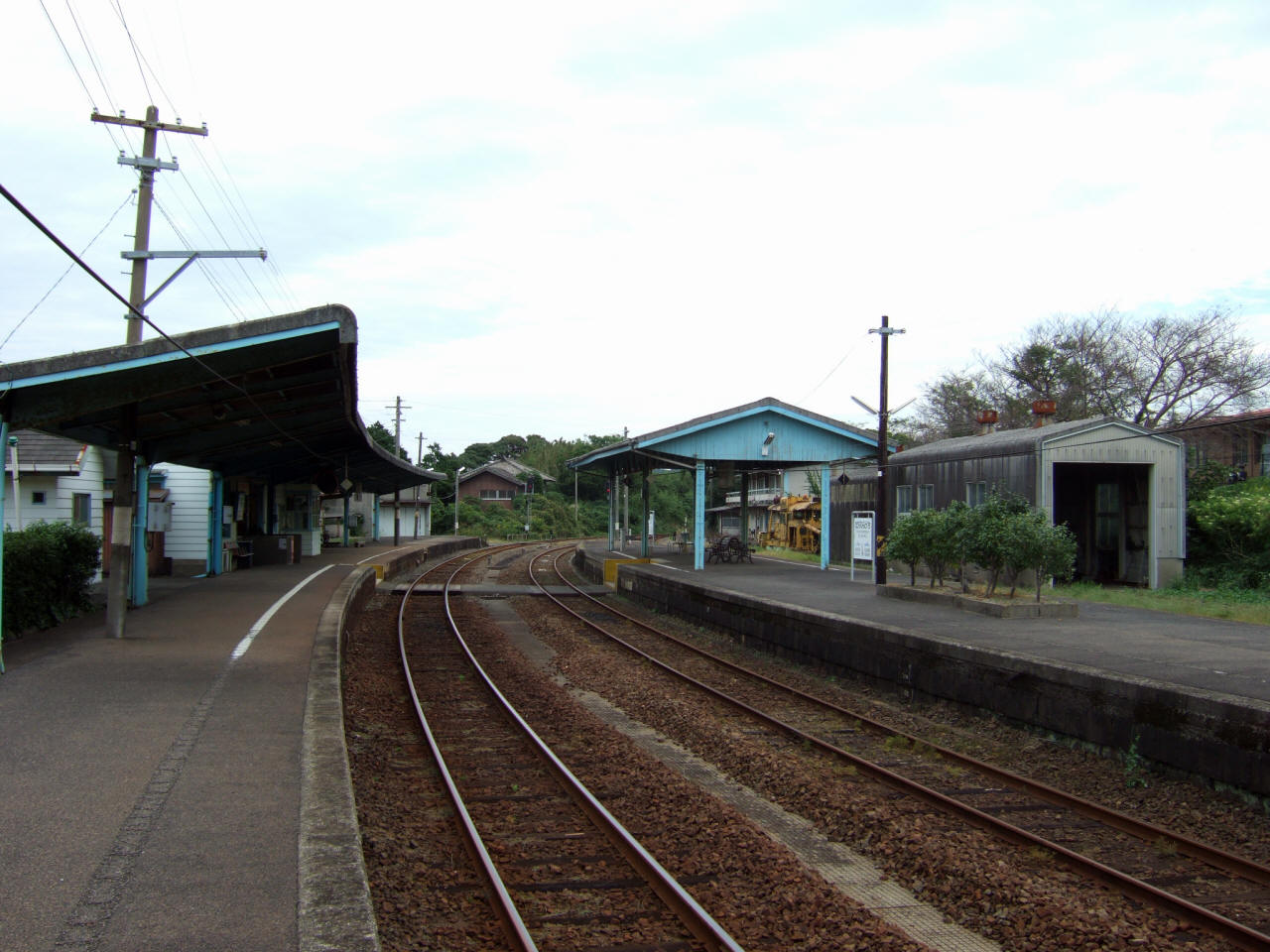
The platforms in October 2007

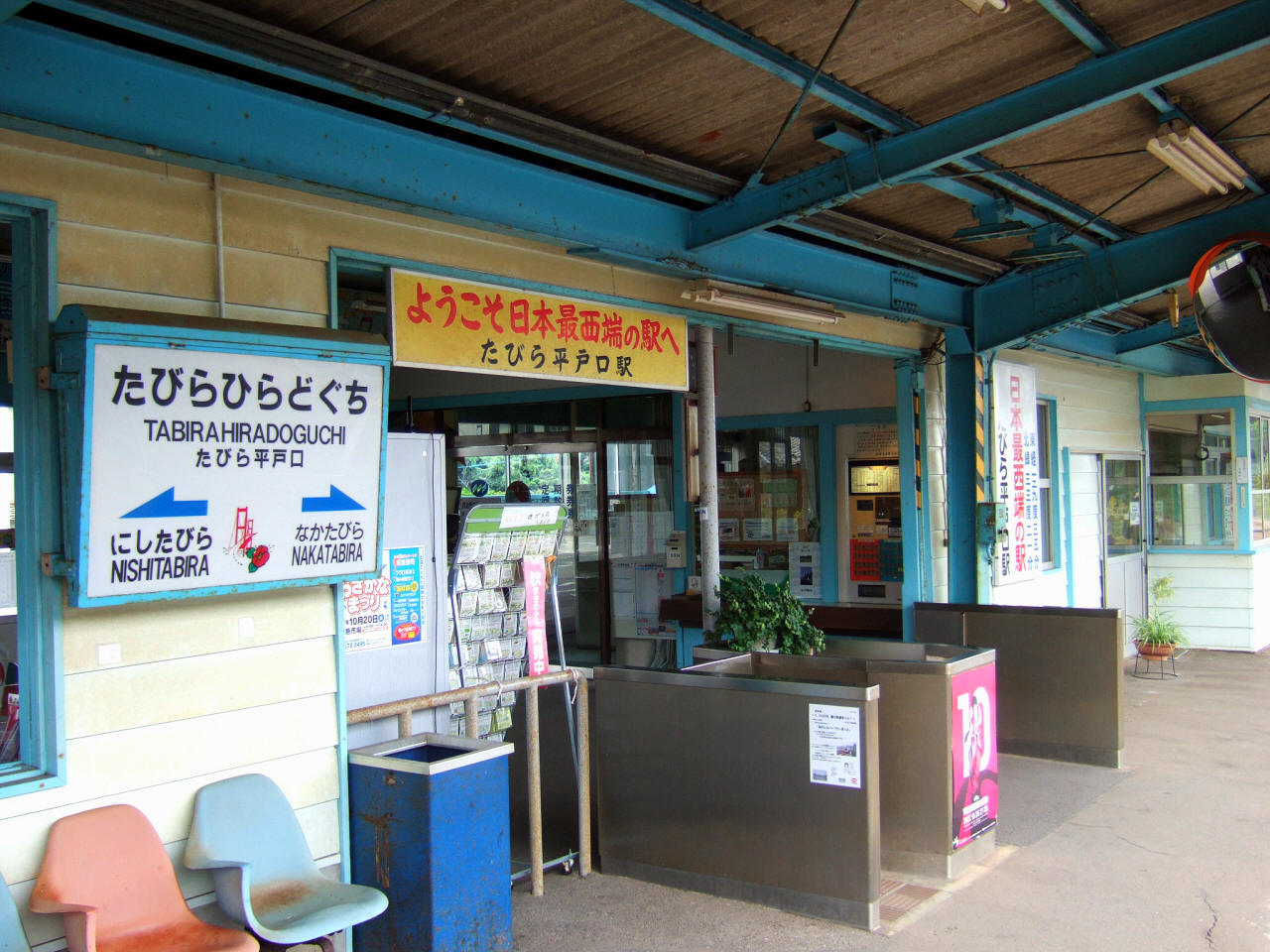
The station interior in October 2007

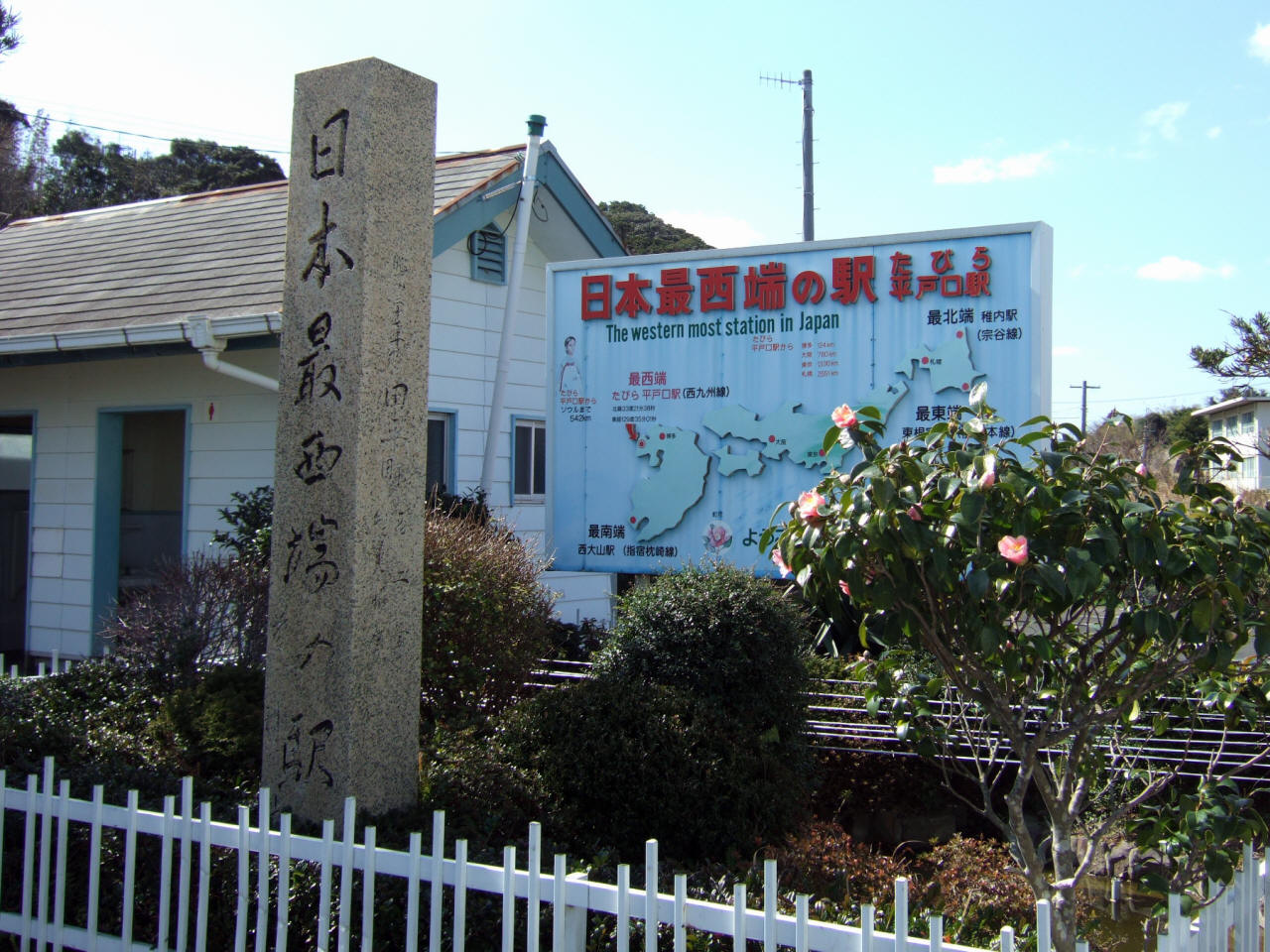
The monument marking the station as the furthest west in Japan
