= Imabuku Station =

Train station on the Matsuura Railway line in Nagasaki Prefecture, Japan

Imabuku Station 今福駅
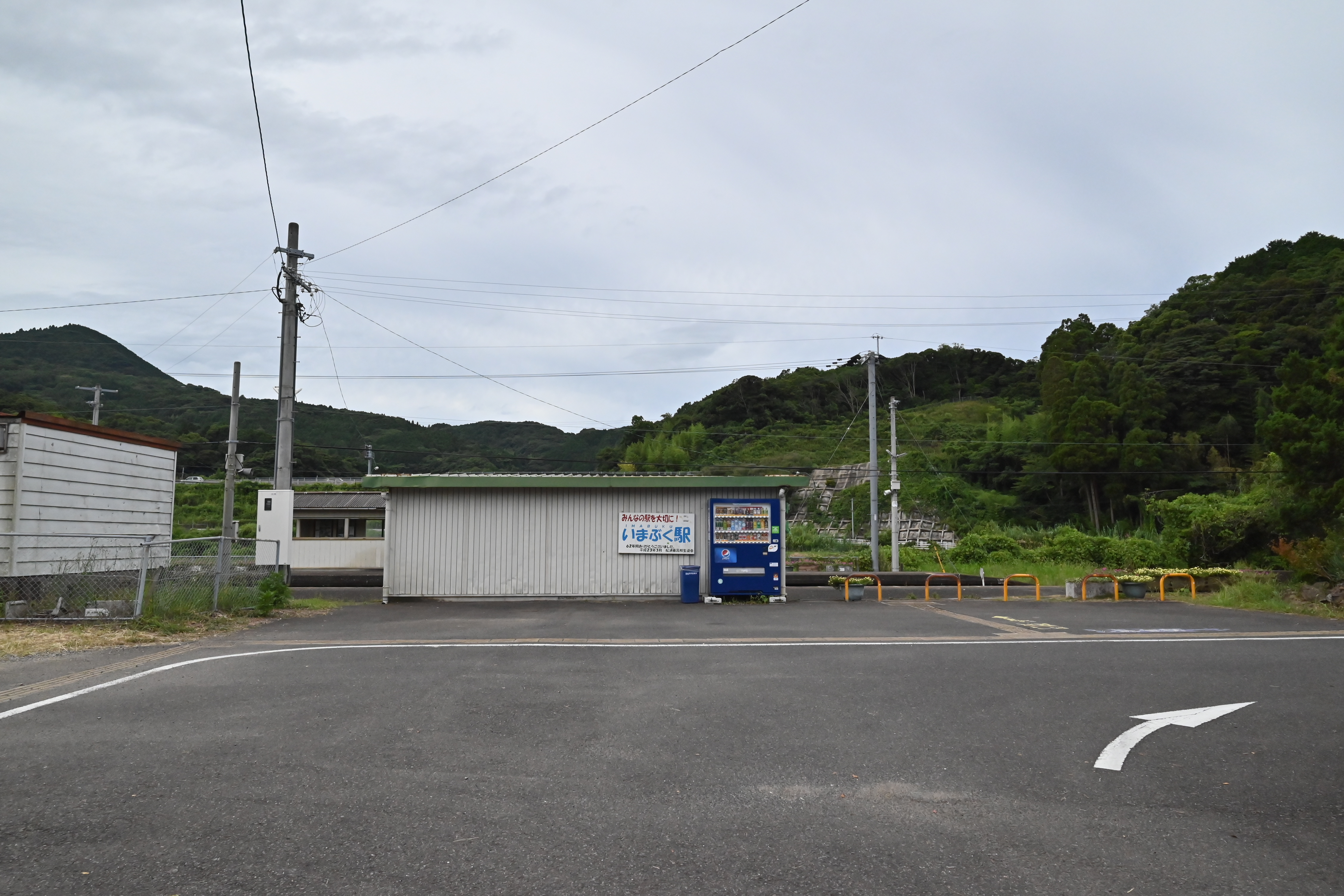
- Station platforms in July 2021

General information
- Location: Matsuura, Nagasaki Prefecture; Japan
- Coordinates: 33°20′54.52″N 129°46′18.70″E
- Operator: Matsuura Railway
- Line: ■ Nishi-Kyūshū Line
- Distance: 27.5 km from Arita Station
- Platforms: 2
- Tracks: 2

Construction
- Structure type: At-grade

Other information
- Website: Official website (in Japanese)

History
- Opened: 1 October 1930; 95 years ago
- Original company: Japanese National Railways
Location
- Location within Nagasaki Prefecture Location within Japan

Imabuku Station (今福駅, Imabuku-eki; いまぶくえき) is a train station located in Matsuura, Nagasaki Prefecture, Japan. It is on the Nishi-Kyūshū Line which has been operated by the third-sector Matsuura Railway since 1988.

== Lines ==
- Matsuura Railway
  - Nishi-Kyūshū Line

Trains on this branch terminate at either Imari or Saza. Travellers can transfer at Imari for local trains to Arita, or either a local or rapid train from Saza to Sasebo. It is 27.5 km from Arita.

== Station layout ==
The station consists of two ground-level side platforms with two tracks.

== Adjacent stations ==
«	Service	»
Nishi-Kyūshū Line
Fukushimaguchi	Local	Takashimaguchi

== See also ==
- List of railway stations in Japan
