= Ōshima, Nagasaki (Kitamatsuura) =

Municipality in Nagasaki prefecture, Japan

Ōshima (大島村, Ōshima-mura) was a village located on Azuchi-Oshima Island in Kitamatsuura District, Nagasaki Prefecture, Japan.

As of 2003, the village had an estimated population of 1,659 and a density of 106.89 persons per km^{2}. The total area was 15.52 km^{2}.

On October 1, 2005, Ōshima, along with the towns of Ikitsuki and Tabira (all from Kitamatsuura District), was merged into the expanded city of Hirado.

== Economy ==
The main occupations on the island are fishing, including fish farming, and farming. Crops include tobacco, rice, and potatoes. One use of Ōshima's rice is in the brewing of sake. Other occupations include local government and school teachers. There are also over a dozen wind turbines beautifully located on the island. This wind farm is operated by the company Mitsuuroko Green Energy. The installation consists of 16 Vestas V80-2.0MW with a nameplate capacity of 32000 kW. It began full operation in 2007.

== Access ==
Ōshima can only be reached via a ferry boat from Hirado Port. It takes approximately 45 minutes to get to the island and there are five departures every day in each direction.

== Education ==
There is a public primary school, middle school, and nursery. In March 2011, the only high school on the island closed its doors after its last nine students graduated. During its last three years as an institution, there were as many students as teachers. This closure was due to the general declining birthrate in Japan. Three years earlier the school had stopped accepting incoming students. The building was transferred to the City of Hirado and turned into a community center. Some of the former students at the high school were boarders, some were trouble kids in other schools. The boarders also served to keep up the student numbers in Ōshima's small population.

== Entertainment ==
Ōshima has a pachinko parlor, a snack tavern (karaoke), as well as two izakaya.
