= Shikamachi, Nagasaki =

Dissolved municipality in Nagasaki prefecture, Japan

Coordinates: 33°16′N 129°35′E

Location of Shikamachi in Nagasaki Prefecture

Shikamachi (鹿町町, Shikamachi-chō) was a town located in Kitamatsuura District, Nagasaki Prefecture, Japan.

== Population ==
As of January 1, 2009, the town had an estimated population of 5,115 and a density of 169 persons per km^{2}. The total area was 30.24 km^{2}.

== History ==
Shikamachi was founded as a town in 1947.

On March 31, 2010, Shikamachi, along with the town of Emukae (also from Kitamatsuura District), was merged into the expanded city of Sasebo.

Coal mining was formerly the most important industry in the area, until the coal mines closed in the 1960s.

== Economy ==
The economy is now centered on agriculture and fishing.
