= Matsuura, Nagasaki =

Matsuura 松浦市
- City
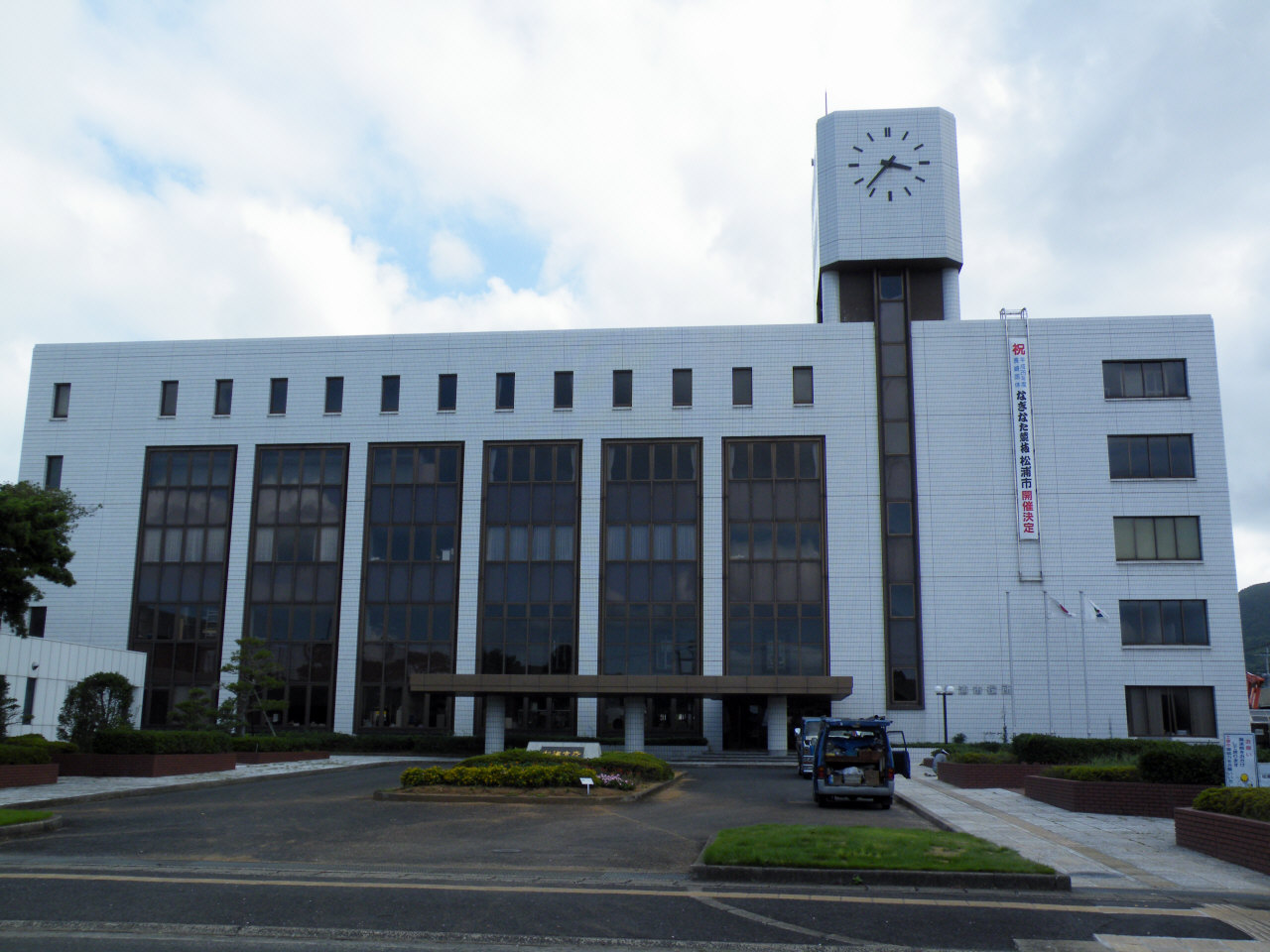
- Matsuura City Hall

- Flag Emblem
- Interactive map of Matsuura
- Location in Japan
- Coordinates: 33°20′27″N 129°42′33″E
- Country: Japan
- Region: Kyushu
- Prefecture: Nagasaki

Area
  - Total: 130.55 km^{2} (50.41 sq mi)

Population (June 1, 2024)
  - Total: 20,667
  - Density: 158.31/km^{2} (410.01/sq mi)
- Time zone: UTC+09:00 (JST)
- City hall address: 365 Sasamachi Satomen, Matsuura-shi, Nagasaki-ken 859-4598
- Climate: Cfa
- Website: Official website
- Symbols
- Flower: Rhododendron
- Tree: Podocarpaceae

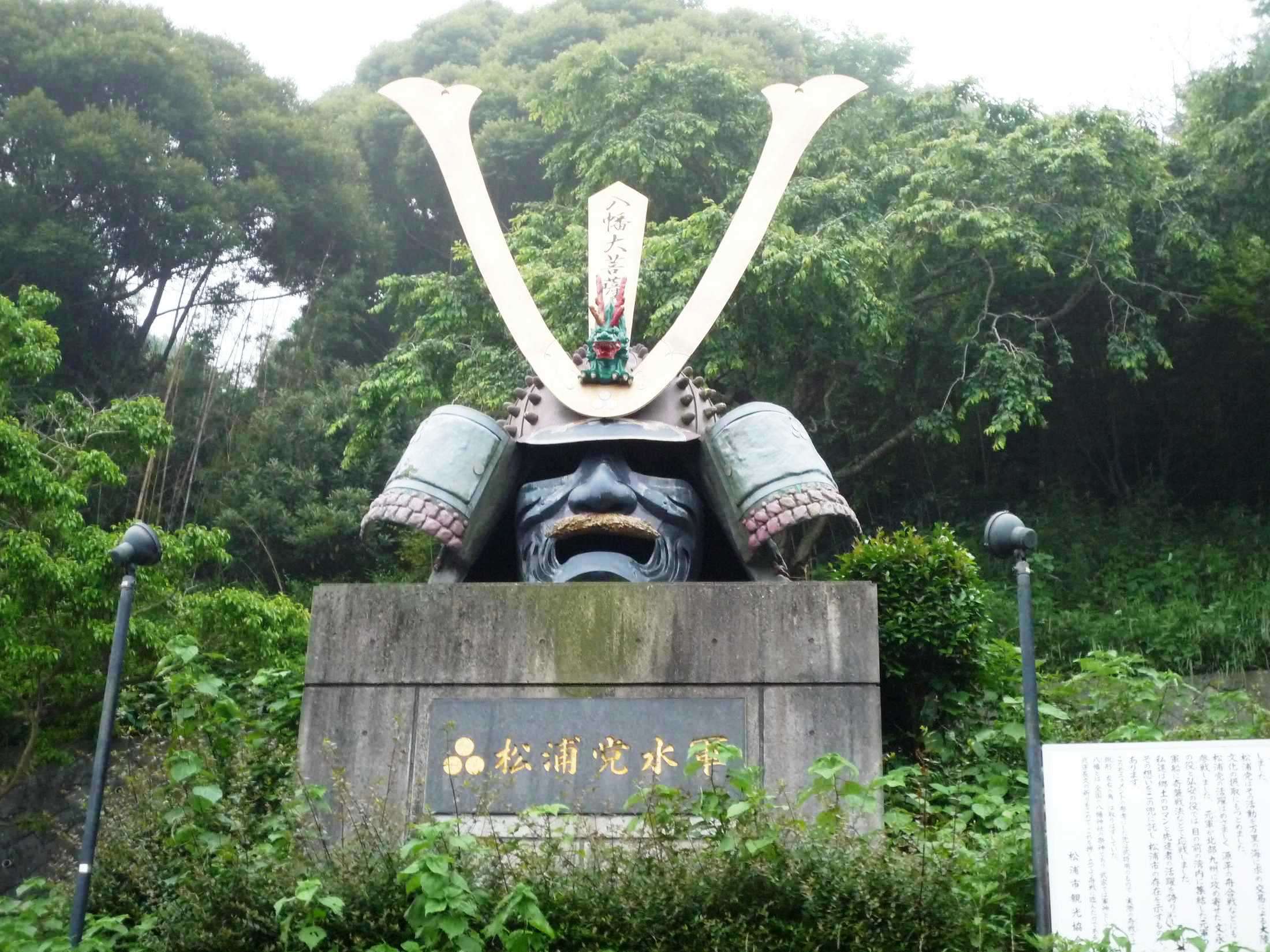
Monument to Matsura clan

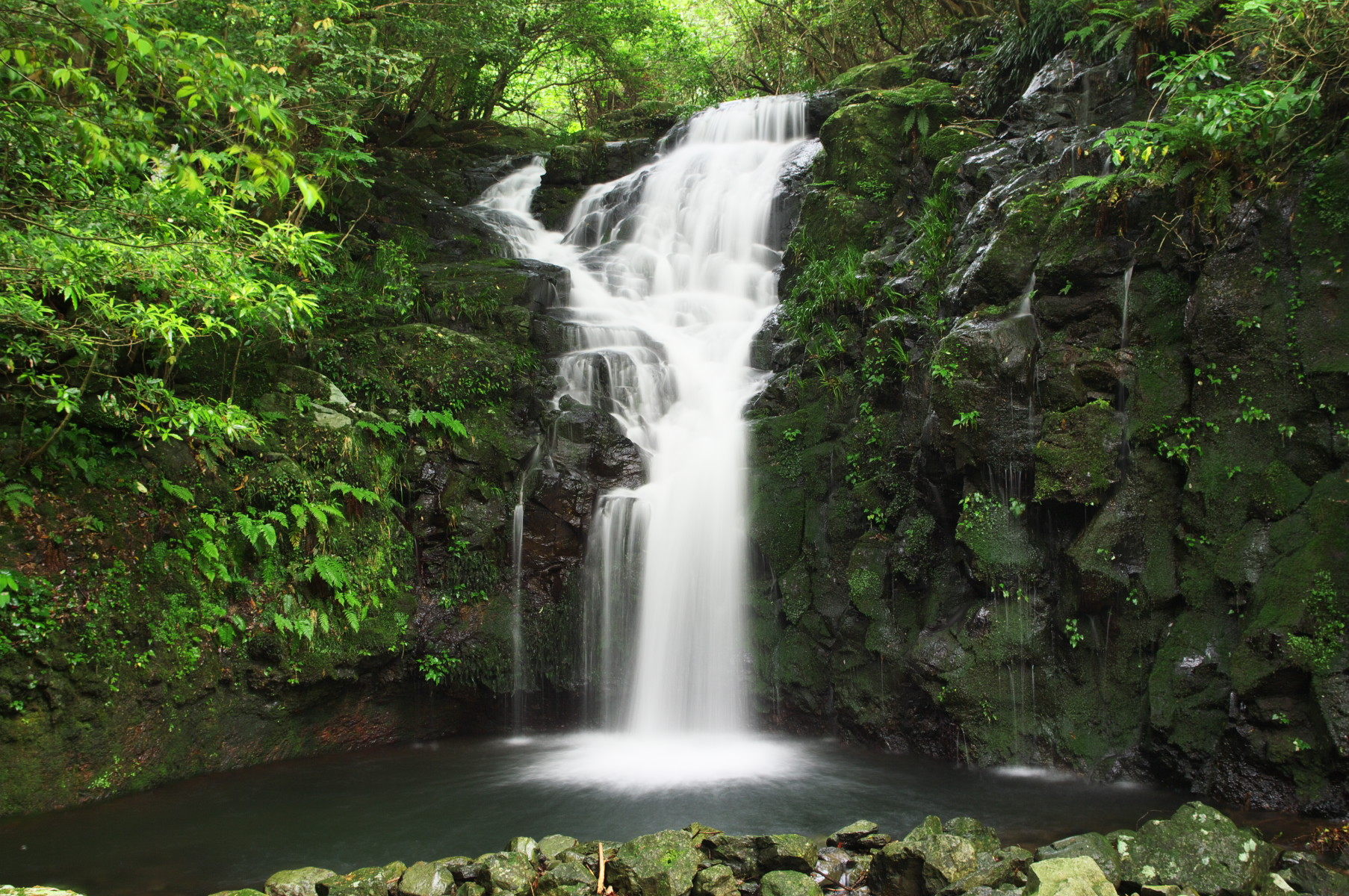
Ryuo Falls

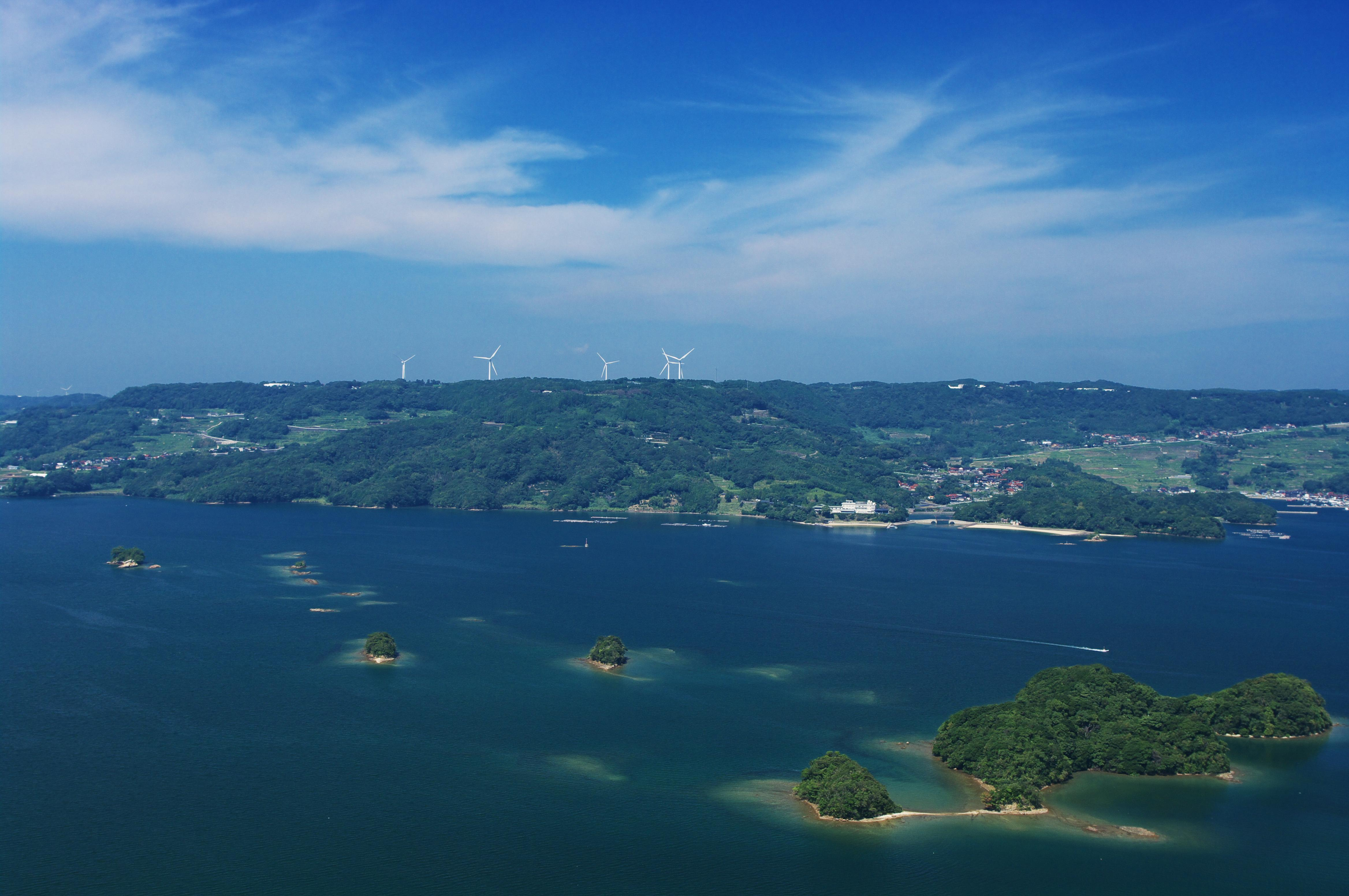
Matsuura coast

Matsuura (松浦市, Matsuura-shi; Japanese pronunciation: [mä̀.t͡sɨ́.ɯ̈̀.ɾä̀, -ɯ̈́.ɾä́.ɕì]) is a city located in Nagasaki Prefecture, Japan. As of 1 June 2024, the city had an estimated population of 20,667 in 9936 households, and a population density of 160 people per km^{2}. The total area of the city is 130.55 km^{2} (50.41 sq mi)

== Geography ==
Matsuura City is located in the northeastern part of the Kitamatsuura Peninsula in northwestern Nagasaki Prefecture, facing Imari Bay from the Genkai Sea to the north, and bordering Imari City in Saga Prefecture to the east. The inland area to the south of the city is a hilly lava plateau with little flat land. Rivers such as the Sakase River, Tatsuo River, Sasa River, Chokawa River, and Imabuku River flow through the city, and at the mouth of the river is an area of singing sand known as "Gigigahama".

The administrative area includes the inhabited islands of Fukushima, Takashima, Kuroshima, Tobishima, and Aoshima, in Imari Bay. Of these islands Fukushima is connected to the neighboring Imari City by the Fukushima Ohashi Bridge and Takashima is connected to Karatsu City by the Takashima Hizen Ohashi Bridge. As such, the two islands have strong economic and geographical ties not only with the mainland of Matsuura City, but also with Saga Prefecture. Fukushima and Tsukinokawa are known for their cascading rice terraces.

=== Surrounding municipalities ===
Nagasaki Prefecture

- Hirado
- Sasebo

Saga Prefecture

- Imari
- Karatsu

=== Climate ===
Matsuura has a humid subtropical climate (Köppen:Cfa) with hot summers and cool winters. The average annual temperature in Matsuura is 16.6 °C (61.9 °F). The average annual rainfall is 2,195.2 mm (86.43 in) with August as the wettest month. The temperatures are highest on average in August, at around 27.4 °C (81.3 °F), and lowest in January, at around 7.0 °C (44.6 °F). Its record high is 37.5 °C (99.5 °F), reached on 7 August 2026, and its record low is −4.1 °C (24.6 °F), reached on 24 January 2016.

Climate data for Matsuura (2011−2020 normals, extremes 2011−present)
Month	Jan	Feb	Mar	Apr	May	Jun	Jul	Aug	Sep	Oct	Nov	Dec	Year
Record high °C (°F)	20.0 (68.0)	21.8 (71.2)	24.6 (76.3)	26.9 (80.4)	32.7 (90.9)	32.8 (91.0)	37.0 (98.6)	37.5 (99.5)	36.9 (98.4)	31.3 (88.3)	28.8 (83.8)	23.7 (74.7)	37.5 (99.5)
Mean daily maximum °C (°F)	10.3 (50.5)	10.9 (51.6)	14.8 (58.6)	18.9 (66.0)	23.3 (73.9)	25.3 (77.5)	29.6 (85.3)	31.1 (88.0)	26.9 (80.4)	22.5 (72.5)	17.8 (64.0)	12.0 (53.6)	20.3 (68.5)
Daily mean °C (°F)	7.0 (44.6)	7.4 (45.3)	10.8 (51.4)	14.6 (58.3)	19.0 (66.2)	22.0 (71.6)	26.4 (79.5)	27.4 (81.3)	23.4 (74.1)	18.9 (66.0)	13.9 (57.0)	8.7 (47.7)	16.6 (61.9)
Mean daily minimum °C (°F)	3.7 (38.7)	3.6 (38.5)	6.8 (44.2)	10.4 (50.7)	14.9 (58.8)	19.4 (66.9)	23.9 (75.0)	24.4 (75.9)	20.4 (68.7)	15.4 (59.7)	10.0 (50.0)	5.2 (41.4)	13.2 (55.7)
Record low °C (°F)	−4.1 (24.6)	−3.4 (25.9)	−0.7 (30.7)	2.9 (37.2)	6.3 (43.3)	13.2 (55.8)	17.4 (63.3)	17.8 (64.0)	12.5 (54.5)	8.0 (46.4)	2.5 (36.5)	−0.5 (31.1)	−4.1 (24.6)
Average precipitation mm (inches)	86.0 (3.39)	99.9 (3.93)	135.7 (5.34)	167.6 (6.60)	147.7 (5.81)	309.2 (12.17)	337.0 (13.27)	364.7 (14.36)	214.4 (8.44)	142.0 (5.59)	108.3 (4.26)	89.8 (3.54)	2,195.2 (86.43)
Average precipitation days (≥ 1.0 mm)	8.4	9.7	8.7	8.8	7.7	13.0	12.2	10.3	11.9	8.0	8.8	8.4	115.9
Mean monthly sunshine hours	102.9	108.8	173.0	192.9	213.0	122.8	172.4	212.4	146.6	168.4	131.8	88.9	1,831.8
Source: Japan Meteorological Agency

== Demographics ==
Per Japanese census data, the population of Matsuura in 2020 is 21,271 people. Matsuura has been conducting censuses since 1920. Matsuura's population peaked in 1960, when the population exceeded 60,000, and has since declined slowly; in 2020, the city's population is only 50% of what it was in the 1950s.

Historical population

Year	Pop.	±%
1920	31,403	—
1925	29,891	−4.8%
1930	31,146	+4.2%
1935	31,748	+1.9%
1940	41,104	+29.5%
1945	53,292	+29.7%
1950	57,777	+8.4%
1955	58,388	+1.1%
1960	60,912	+4.3%
1965	46,982	−22.9%
1970	36,598	−22.1%

Year	Pop.	±%
1975	33,042	−9.7%
1980	32,478	−1.7%
1985	32,312	−0.5%
1990	31,254	−3.3%
1995	30,470	−2.5%
2000	28,370	−6.9%
2005	26,993	−4.9%
2010	25,158	−6.8%
2015	23,309	−7.3%
2020	21,271	−8.7%

Matsuura population statistics

== History ==
Mention of a "Matsuura County" appears in written records from the Heian period, and this area was the home of the Matsura clan, a local warrior clan. Takashima, within the borders of the modern town, is the location where the Mongol invasions of Japan, floundered due to the winds of typhoons in 1274 and 1281, giving rise to the legend of the kamikaze. In the Edo period, the area was largely under the control of the Hirado Domain.

The villages of Sasa, Mikuriya, Hoshika, Chokawa, Imabuku, Fukushima, and Takashima were established with the creation of the modern municipalities system on April 1, 1889. The discovery of coal in the early Meiji period led to the rapid economic development of the area in the late 19th and early 20th centuries; however, the coal mines closed in the 1960s. On November 1, 1922, Sasa was raised to town status, followed by Imabuku on April 1, 1929. On January 1, 1941, Mikuriya and Hosika merged to form the town of Shin-Mikuriya. Chokawa was raised to town status on January 1, 1949, followed by Fukushima on January 21, 1951. On March 31, 1955, Sasa, Shin Mikuriya, and Chokawa merged to form the city of Matsuura. On April 15, 1955, Imafuku was annexed by Matsuura. On January 1, 1975, Takashima was raised to town status.

On January 1, 2006, Matsuura absorbed the towns of Fukushima and Takashima (both from Kitamatsuura District) to become the current and expanded city of Matsuura.

== Government ==
Matsuura has a mayor-council form of government with a directly elected mayor and a unicameral city council of 17 members. Matsuura contributes one member to the Nagasaki Prefectural Assembly. In terms of national politics, the city is part of the Nagasaki 3rd district of the lower house of the Diet of Japan. The city was previously part of Nagasaki 4th district, which was abolished in 2022.

== Economy ==
In the Meiji period, the area was known for its coal fields; however, by the 1960s the last coal mines had been closed. Matsuura is located in a now primarily rural area, with several industrial companies located near the city center including a steel works, a commercial fish market, and a regional power plant. The amount of catch at Matsuura fish market is about 89,294 tons. (8th place in Japan)

== Education ==
Matsuura has eight public elementary schools, six public junior high schools and one combined elementary/junior high school operated by the town government, and one public high school operated by the Nagasaki Prefectural Board of Education.

== Transportation ==
=== Railways ===
Matsuura Railway - Nishi-Kyūshū Line

- Imabuku - Takashimaguchi - Maehama - Tsukinokawa - Matsuura - Matsuura Hatsudensho-mae - Mikuriya - Nishikoba

=== Highways ===
- Nishi-Kyūshū Expressway
- National Route 204

== Sister cities ==
- Mackay, Australia, sister city since 1989
- Khujirt, Mongolia, friendship city since 1991
