= Hirado Bridge =

Suspension bridge

Hirado Bridge 平戸大橋 (Hirado Ō-hashi)
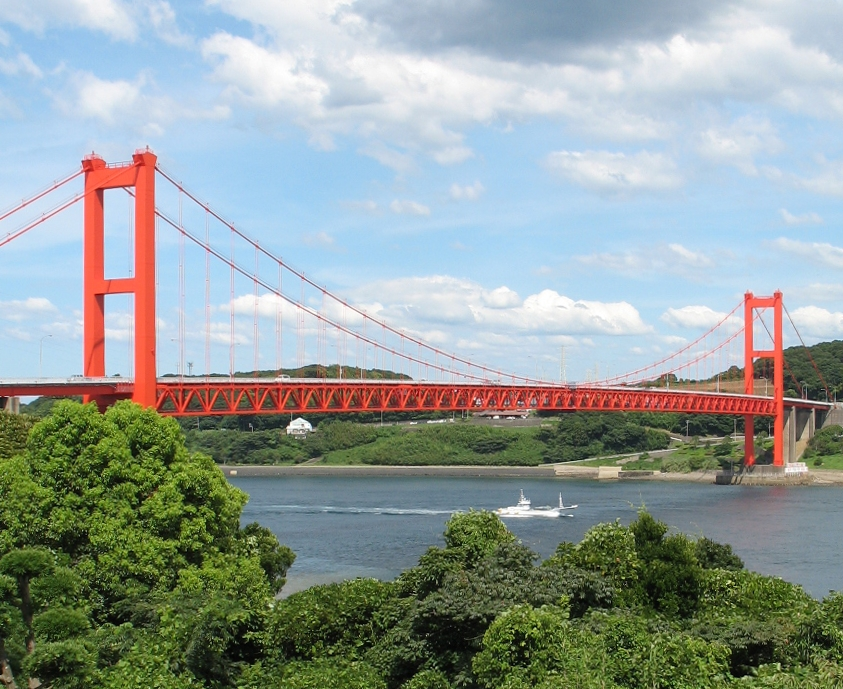
- Coordinates: 33°21′24″N 129°34′20″E
- Carries: Japan National Route 383
- Locale: Nagasaki Prefecture, Japan

Characteristics
- Design: Suspension bridge
- Material: Steel
- Total length: 665 metres (2,182 ft)
- Longest span: 465.5 metres (1,527 ft)

History
- Opened: 1977

Location
- Interactive map of Hirado Bridge

The Hirado Bridge (平戸大橋, Hirado Ō-hashi) is a suspension bridge in Nagasaki Prefecture, Japan. It connects the islands of Hirado and Kitamatsuura Peninsula. Completed in 1977, it has a main span of 465.5 meters and total length of 665 m. From April 1, 2010, no fee is required to pass the bridge.

== See also ==
- List of longest suspension bridge spans
