= Ikisan Station =

Railway station in Itoshima, Fukuoka Prefecture, Japan

JK 11 Ikisan Station 一貴山駅
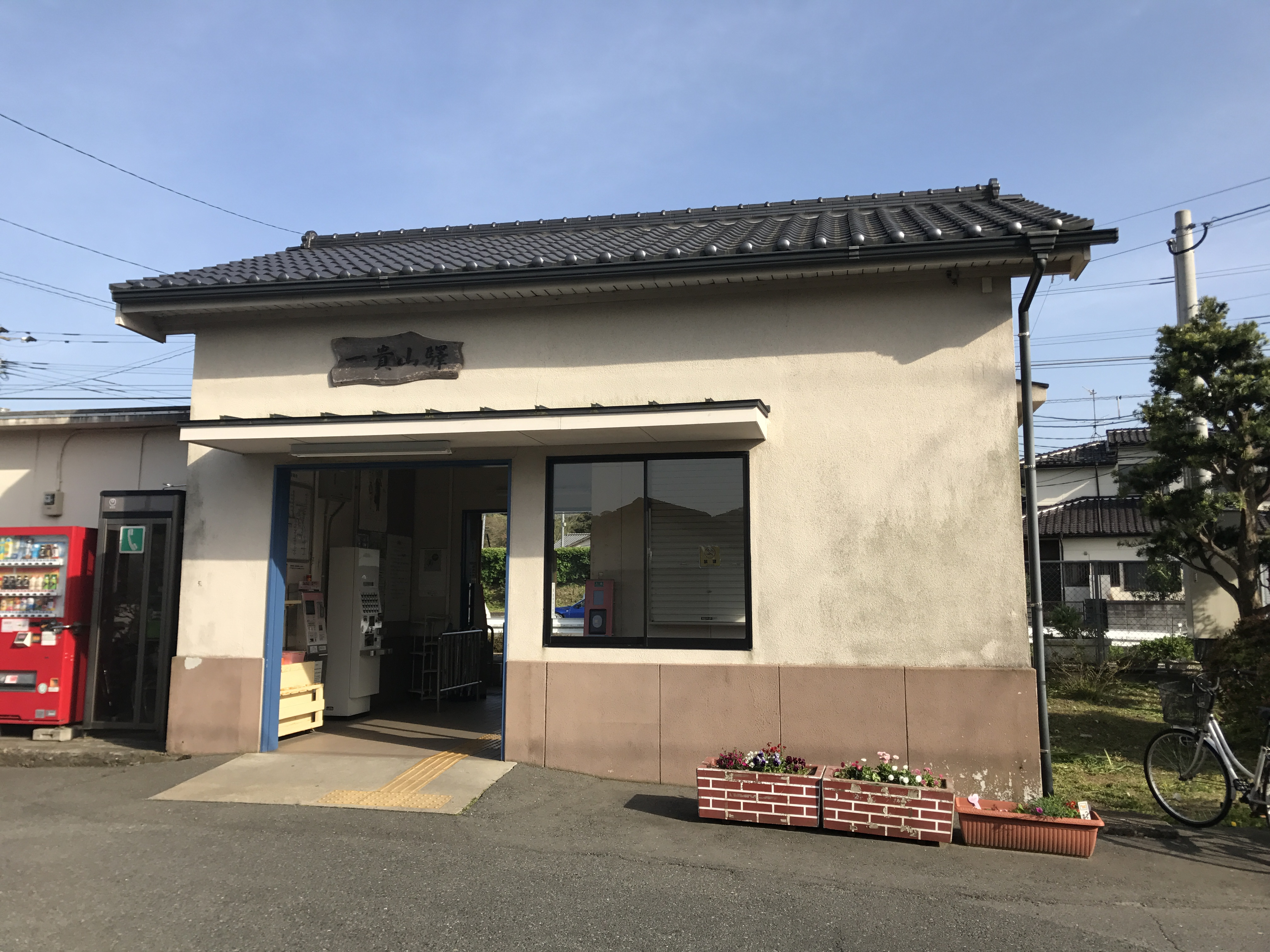
- Ikisan Station in April 2017

General information
- Location: 4-chōme-9 Nijōtanaka, Itoshima-shi, Fukuoka-ken 819-1615; Japan
- Coordinates: 33°32′3.5″N 130°10′5.5″E
- Operator: JR Kyushu
- Line: JK Chikuhi Line
- Distance: 16.7 km from Meinohama
- Platforms: 1 side platform
- Tracks: 1

Construction
- Structure type: At grade
- Accessible: Yes - no steps to platform

Other information
- Status: Unstaffed
- Website: Official website

History
- Opened: 29 May 1924; 102 years ago

Passengers
- FY2020: 363 daily
- Rank: 251st (among JR Kyushu stations)

Services
| Preceding station | JR Kyushu | Following station |
|---|---|---|
| Chikuzen-Fukae towards Nishi-Karatsu | Chikuhi Line Local | Kafuri towards Meinohama |
Location
- Location within Fukuoka Prefecture Location within Japan

Ikisan Station (一貴山駅, Ikisan-eki) is a passenger railway station located in the city of Itoshima, Fukuoka Prefecture, Japan. It is operated by JR Kyushu.

== Lines ==
The station is served by the Chikuhi Line and is located 16.7 km from the starting point of the line at Meinohama. Only local services on the Chikuhi Line stop at this station.

== Station layout ==
The station consists of a side platform serving a single track. The station building, a small timber structure, is unstaffed and serves only as a waiting room. Automatic ticket vending machines and a Sugoca farecard reader are provided.

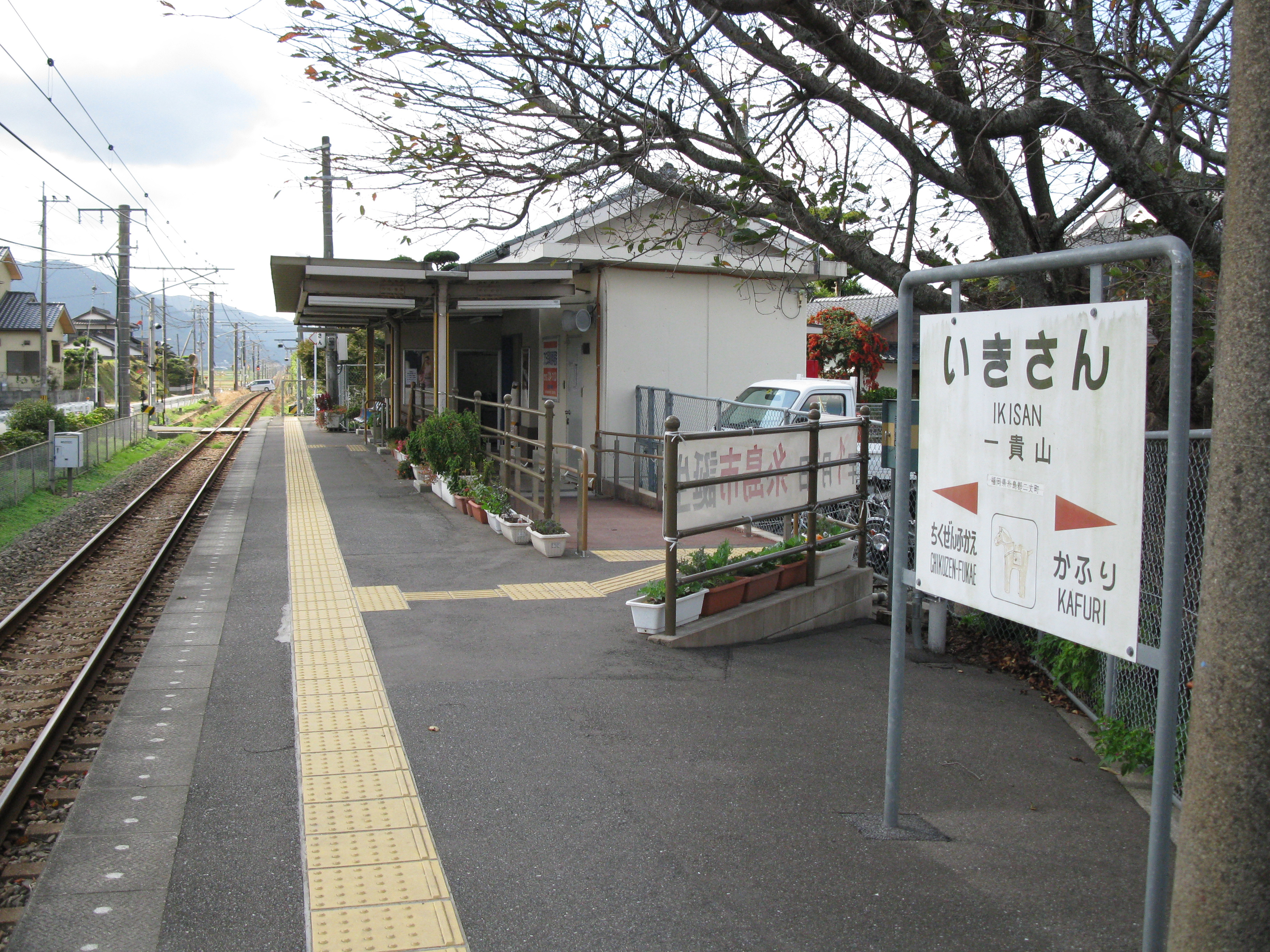
}A view of the station platform and track.

== History ==
The private Kitakyushu Railway had opened a track between Fukuyoshi and Hamasaki on 5 December 1923. By 1 April 1924, the line had been extended east to Maebaru (today Chikuzen-Maebaru). Ikisan was opened on 29 April 1924 as an additional station on the existing track between Fukuyoshi and Maebaru. When the Kitakyushu Railway was nationalized on 1 October 1937, Japanese Government Railways (JGR) took over control of the station and designated the line which served it as the Chikuhi Line. With the privatization of Japanese National Railways (JNR), the successor of JGR, on 1 April 1987, control of the station passed to JR Kyushu.

== Passenger statistics ==
In fiscal 2020, the station was used by an average of 363 passengers daily (boarding passengers only), and it ranked 251st among the busiest stations of JR Kyushu.

== Surrounding area ==
- Ikisan Chōshizuka Kofun

== See also ==
- List of railway stations in Japan
