= Dainyū Station =

Railway station in Itoshima, Fukuoka Prefecture, Japan

JK 13 Dainyū Station 大入駅
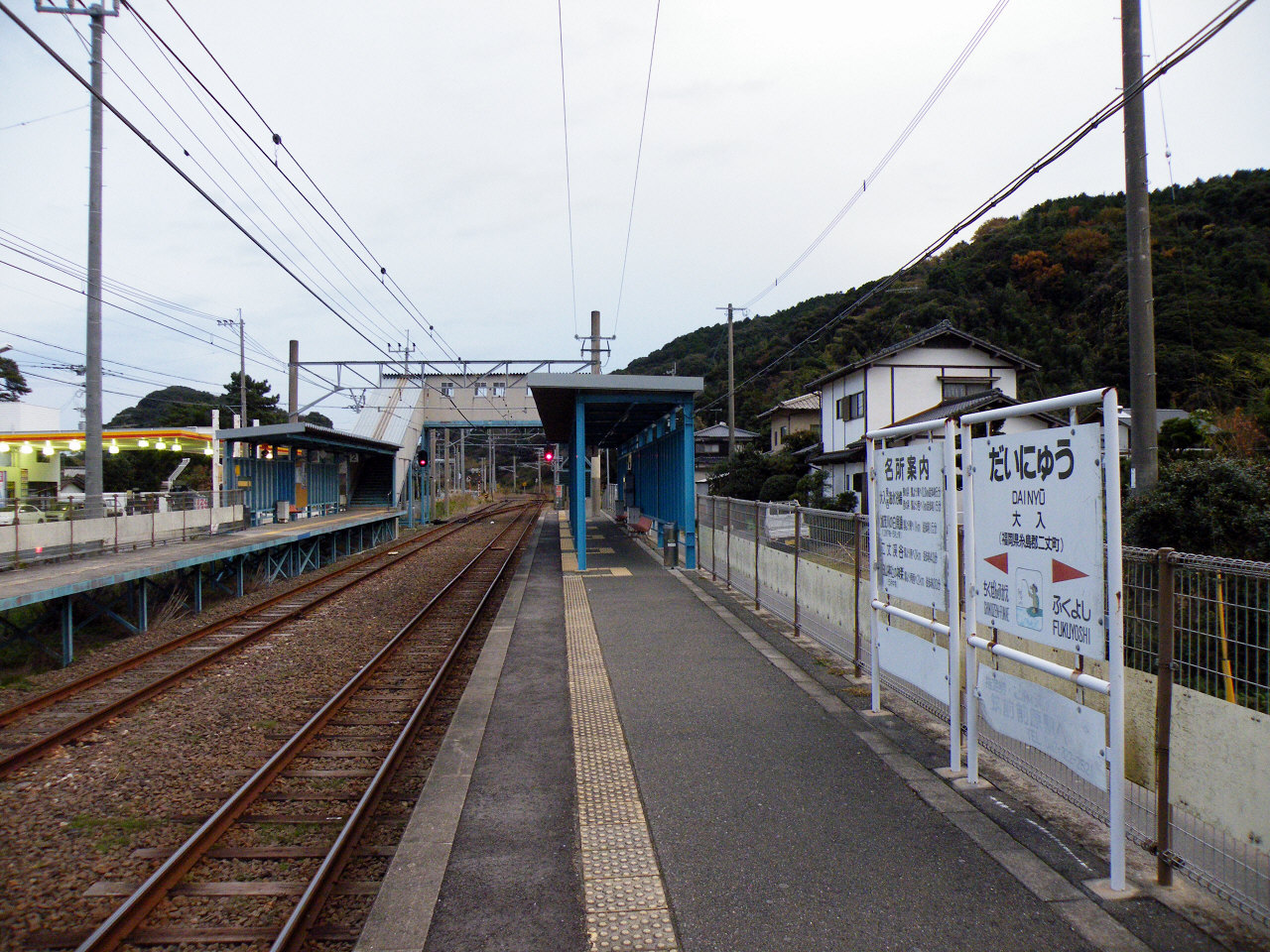
- Dainyū Station platforms in 2008

General information
- Location: Nijofukui, Itoshima-shi, Fukuoka-ken 819-1631; Japan
- Coordinates: 33°30′32″N 130°06′21″E
- Operator: JR Kyushu
- Line: JK Chikuhi Line
- Distance: 23.3 km from Meinohama
- Platforms: 2 side platforms
- Tracks: 2

Construction
- Structure type: At grade
- Accessible: Yes - ramps to both platforms

Other information
- Status: Unstaffed
- Website: Official website

History
- Opened: 15 April 1925; 101 years ago

Passengers
- FY2012: 140 daily

Services
Preceding station	JR Kyushu	Following station
Fukuyoshi towards Nishi-Karatsu	Chikuhi Line Local	Chikuzen-Fukae towards Meinohama
Location
- Location within Fukuoka Prefecture Location within Japan

Dainyū Station (大入駅, Dainyū-eki) is a passenger railway station located in the city of Itoshima, Fukuoka Prefecture, Japan. It is operated by JR Kyushu.

== Lines ==
The station is served by the Chikuhi Line and is located 23.3 km from the starting point of the line at Meinohama. Only local services on the Chikuhi Line stop at this station.

== Station layout ==
The station consists of two side platforms serving two tracks. There is no station building but shelters are provided on both platforms for waiting passengers. The platforms are linked by a covered footbridge but each platform has its own entrance and ramp from the access road on its side.

=== Platforms ===
1	■ JK Chikuhi Line	for Karatsu and Nishi-Karatsu
2	■ JK Chikuhi Line	for Chikuzen-Maebaru, Tenjin and Hakata

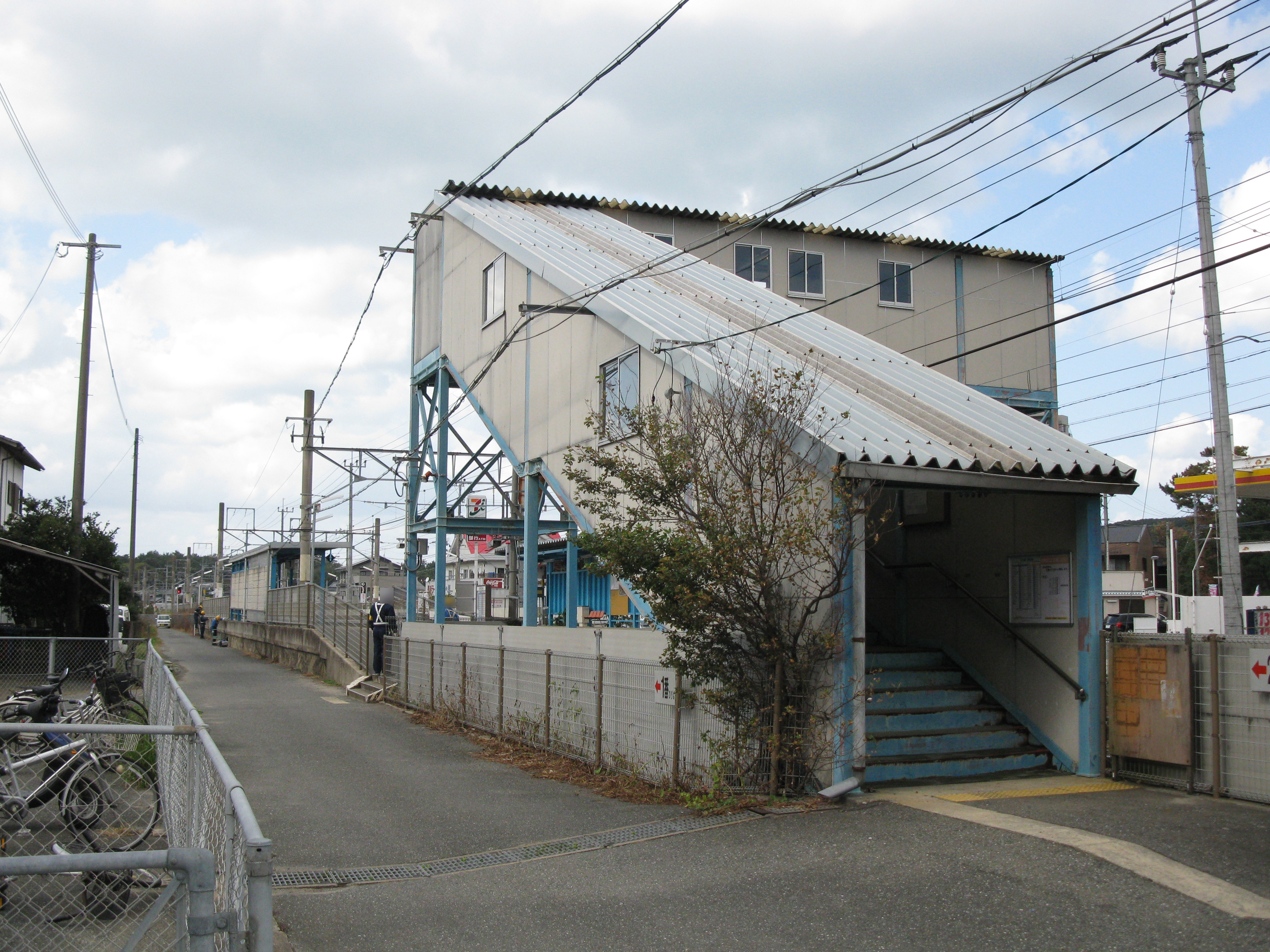
The north entrance of the station.

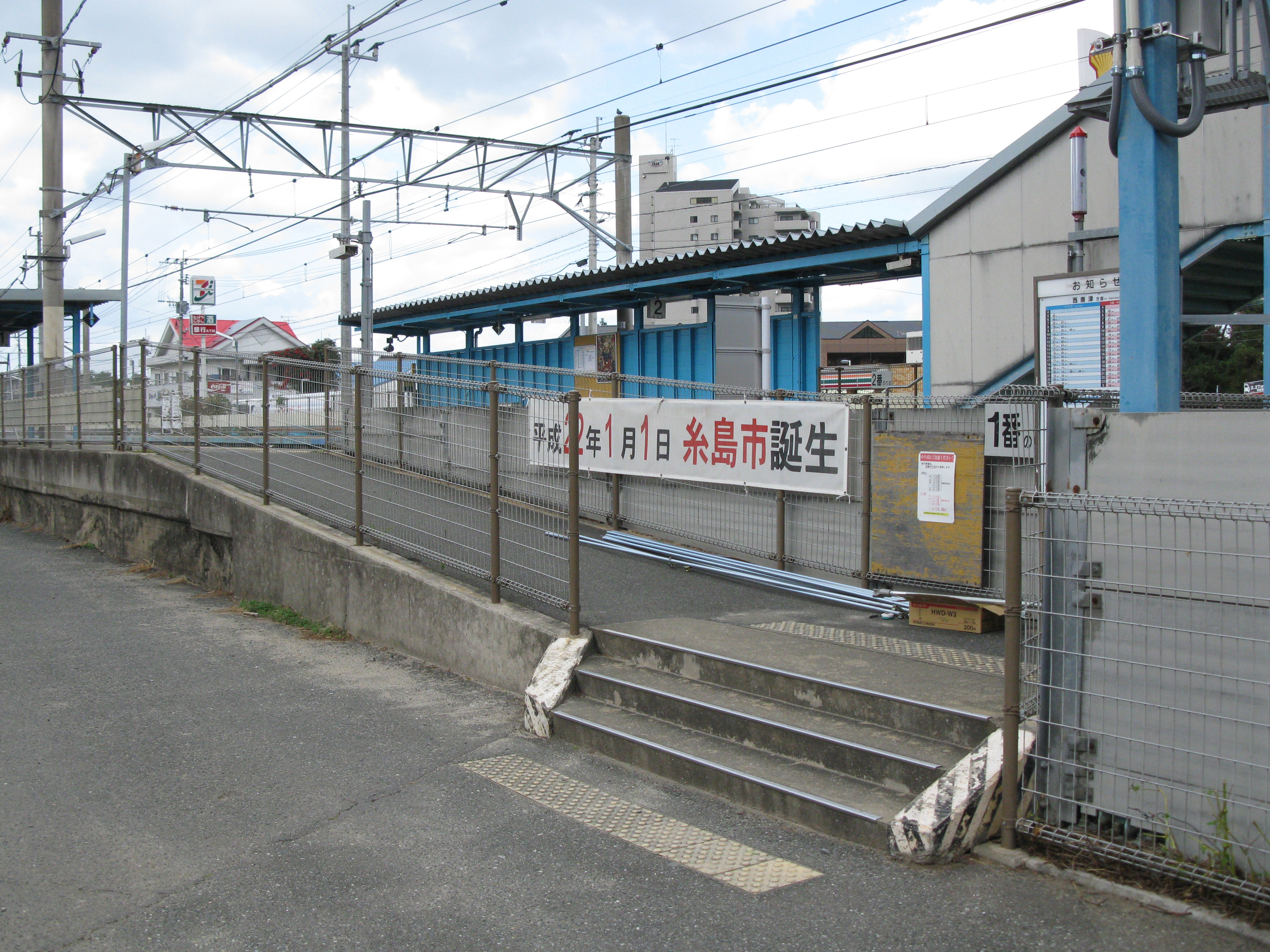
The south entrance of the station.

== History ==
The private Kitakyushu Railway had opened a track between Fukuyoshi and Hamasaki on 5 December 1923. By 1 April 1924, the line had been extended east to Maebaru (today Chikuzen-Maebaru). Dainyū was opened on 15 April 1925 as an additional station on the existing track between Fukuyoshi and Maebaru. When the Kitakyushu Railway was nationalized on 1 October 1937, Japanese Government Railways (JGR) took over control of the station and designated the line which served it as the Chikuhi Line. With the privatization of Japanese National Railways (JNR), the successor of JGR, on 1 April 1987, control of the station passed to JR Kyushu.

== Passenger statistics ==
In fiscal 2012, there were a daily average of 140 passengers (boarding only) using the station.

== Surrounding area ==
- Japan National Route 202
- Dainyū Beach
- Dainyū Fishing Port

== See also ==
- List of railway stations in Japan
