= Shikaka Station =

Railway station in Itoshima, Fukuoka Prefecture, Japan

JK 15 Shikaka Station 鹿家駅
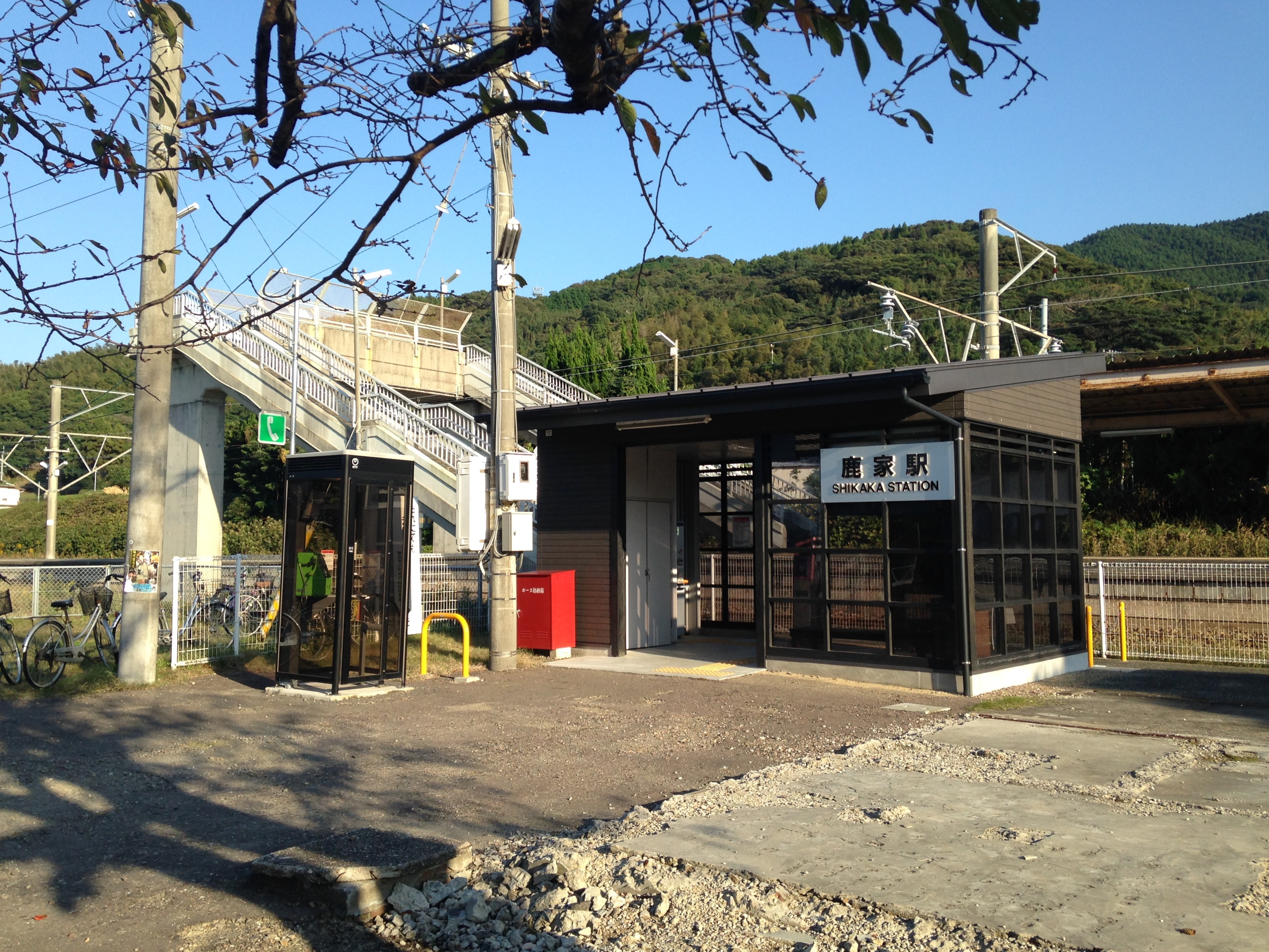
- Shikaka Station in 2014

General information
- Location: Nijoshikaka, Itoshima-shi, Fukuoka-ken 819-1642; Japan
- Coordinates: 33°29′04″N 130°02′51″E
- Operator: JR Kyushu
- Line: JK Chikuhi Line
- Distance: 30.2 km from Meinohama
- Platforms: 1 island platform
- Tracks: 2 + 1 siding

Construction
- Structure type: At grade
- Accessible: No - platforms accessed by footbridge

Other information
- Status: Unstaffed
- Website: Official website

History
- Opened: 5 December 1923; 102 years ago

Passengers
- FY2012: 78 daily

Services
Preceding station	JR Kyushu	Following station
Hamasaki towards Nishi-Karatsu	Chikuhi Line Local	Fukuyoshi towards Meinohama
Location
- Location within Fukuoka Prefecture Location within Japan

Shikaka Station (鹿家駅, Shikaka-eki) is a passenger railway station located in the city of Itoshima, Fukuoka Prefecture, Japan. It is operated by JR Kyushu.

== Lines ==
The station is served by the Chikuhi Line and is located 30.2 km from the starting point of the line at Meinohama. Only local services on the Chikuhi Line stop at this station.

== Station layout ==
The station consists of an unnumbered island platform serving two tracks with a siding. The station building is a modern structure of steel and plate glass and is unstaffed, serving only as a waiting room. Access to the island platform is by means of a footbridge. The station is unattended.

=== Platforms ===
station side	■ JK Chikuhi Line	for Chikuzen-Maebaru, Tenjin and Hakata
opposite side	■ JK Chikuhi Line	for Karatsu and Nishi-Karatsu

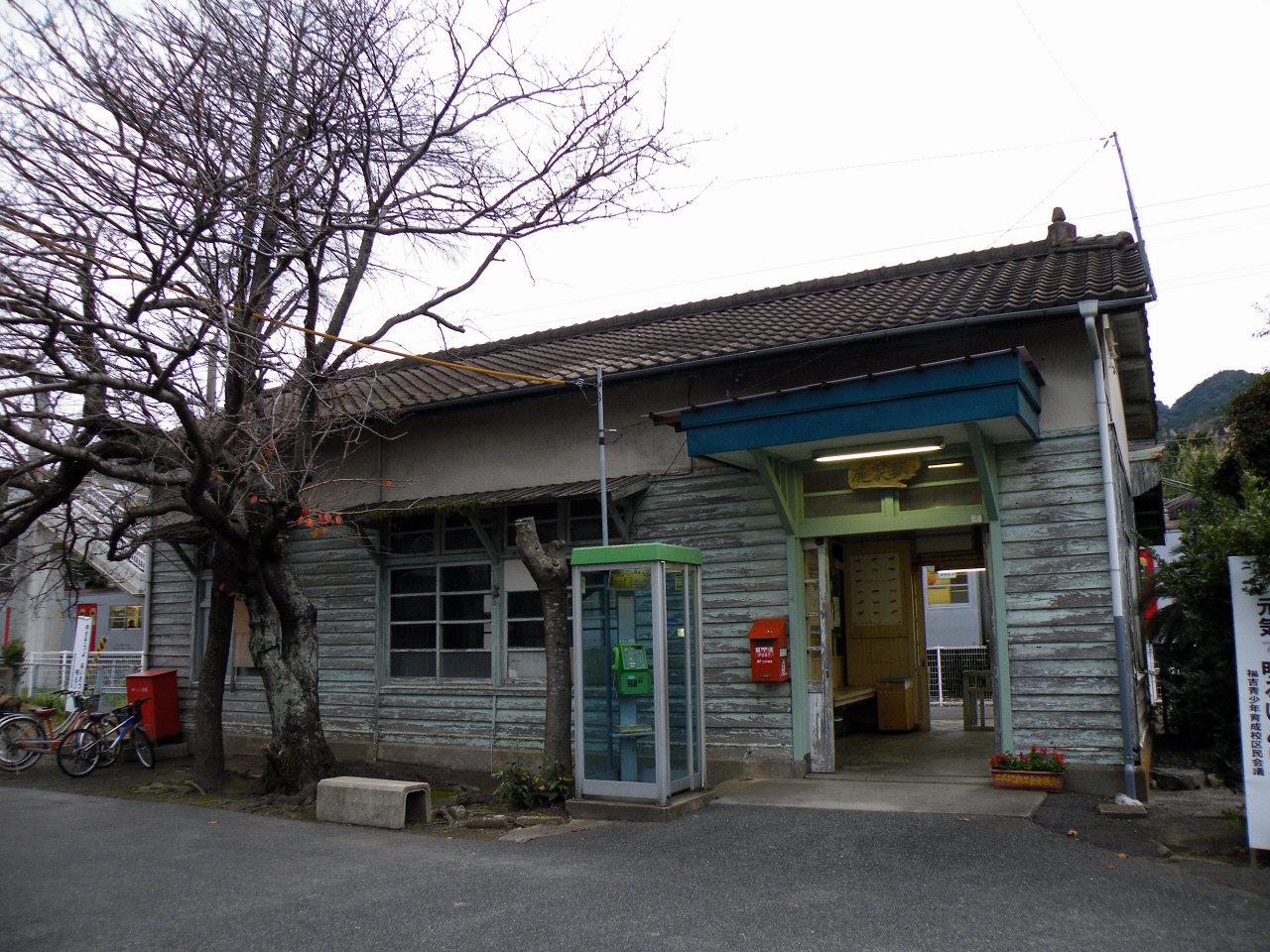
The old station building which has since been demolished.

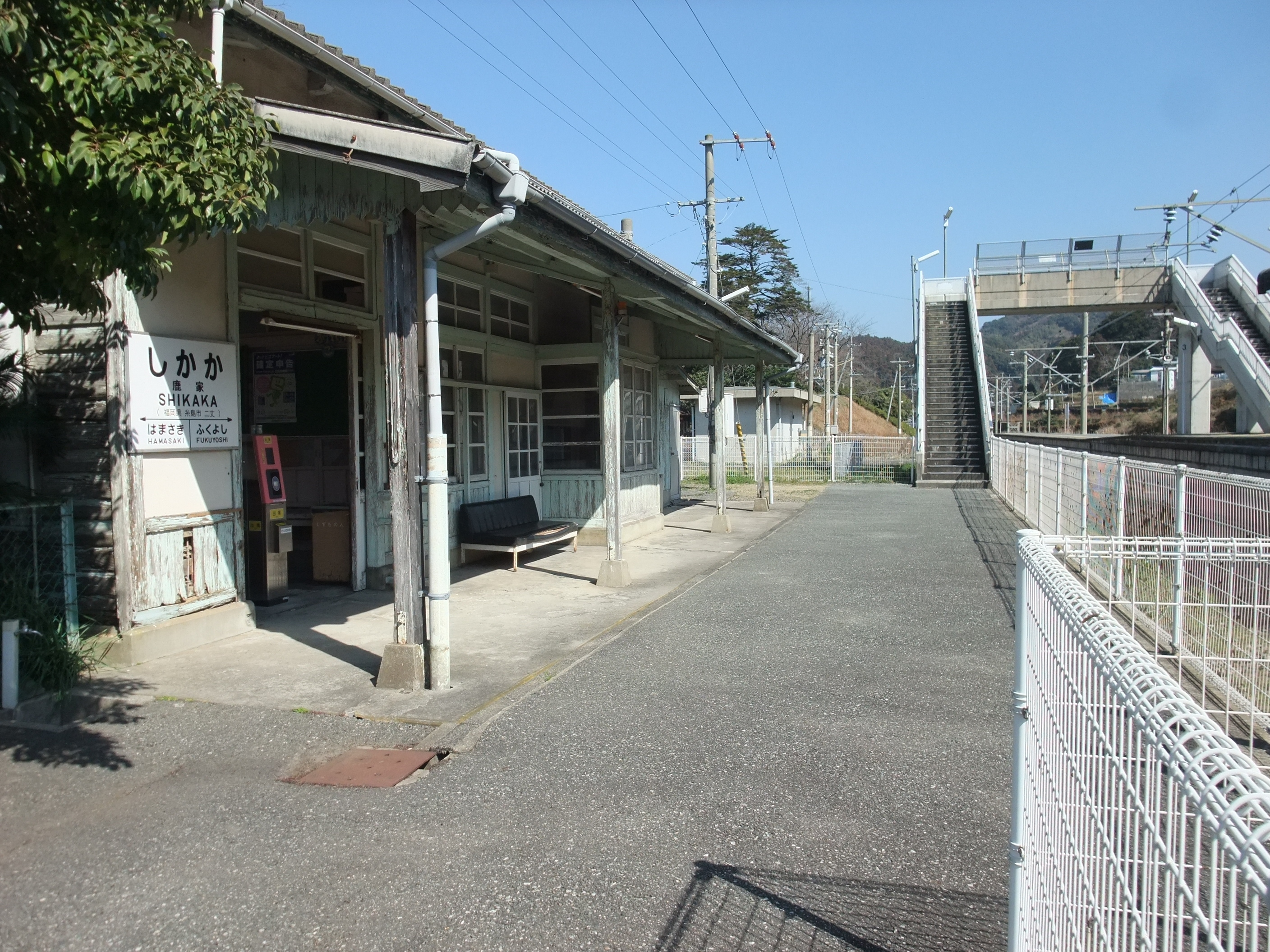
The track side view of the old station building showing the access to the footbridge.

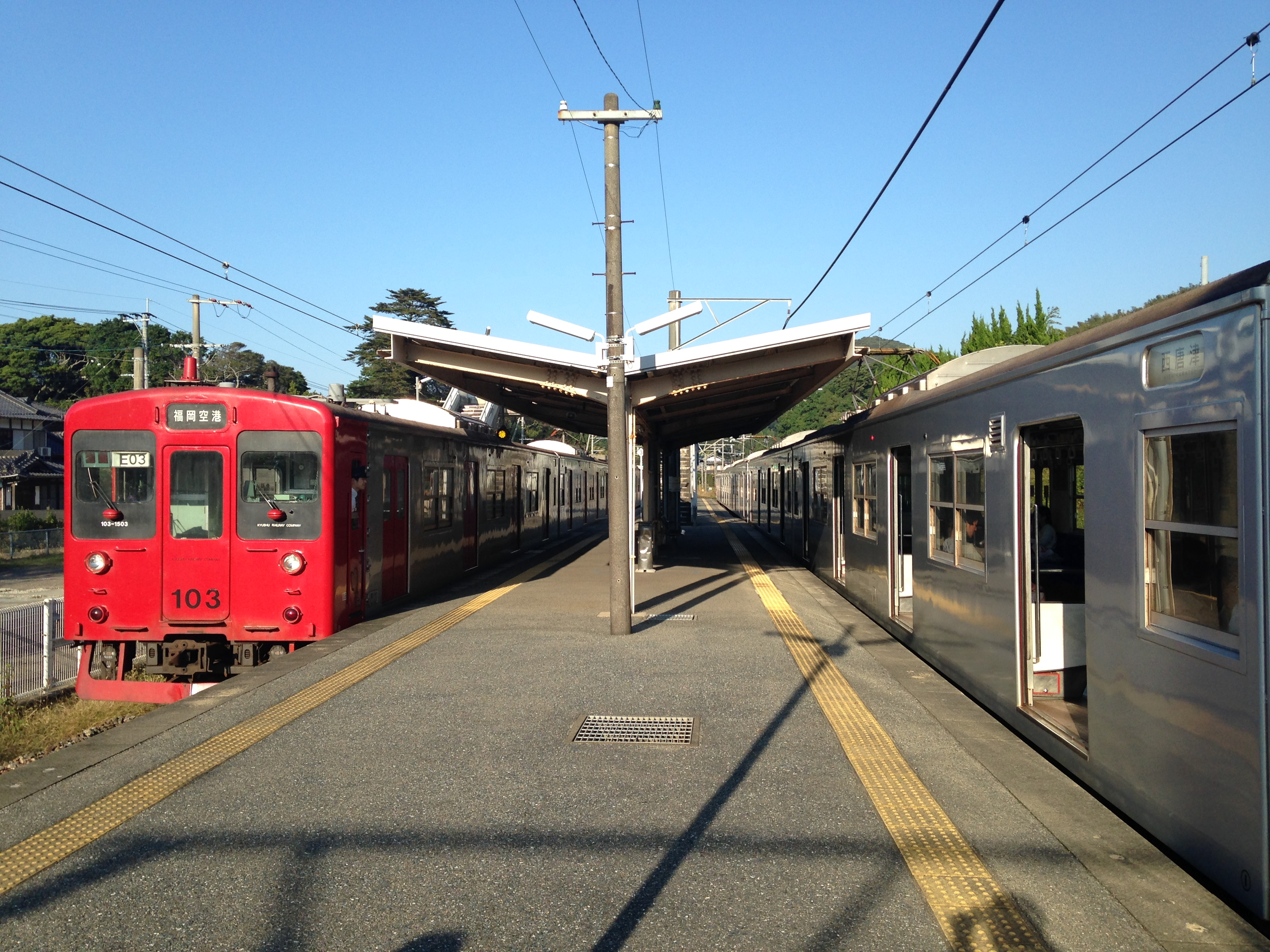
Trains at the platforms of Shikaka station.

== History ==
The private Kitakyushu Railway opened a track between Fukuyoshi and Hamasaki on 5 December 1923 with Shikaka opening on the same day as an intermediate station between the two. When the Kitakyushu Railway was nationalized on 1 October 1937, Japanese Government Railways (JGR) took over control of the station and designated the line which served it as the Chikuhi Line. With the privatization of Japanese National Railways (JNR), the successor of JGR, on 1 April 1987, control of the station passed to JR Kyushu.

In 2012, work began on a new station building to replace the old one which had been built in 1938. The old station building was demolished thereafter.

== Passenger statistics ==
In fiscal 2012, there were a daily average of 78 passengers (boarding only) using the station.

== Surrounding area ==
The station is located on the western outskirts of the former Nijo-cho, and there are few private houses in the area, but there is a small fishing port and an inn. It is about 100 meters up a narrow slope from Japan National Route 202, which runs parallel to the Chikuhi Line.

== See also ==
- List of railway stations in Japan
