= Kyūdai-Gakkentoshi Station =

Railway station in Fukuoka, Japan

JK 04 Kyūdai-Gakkentoshi Station 九大学研都市駅
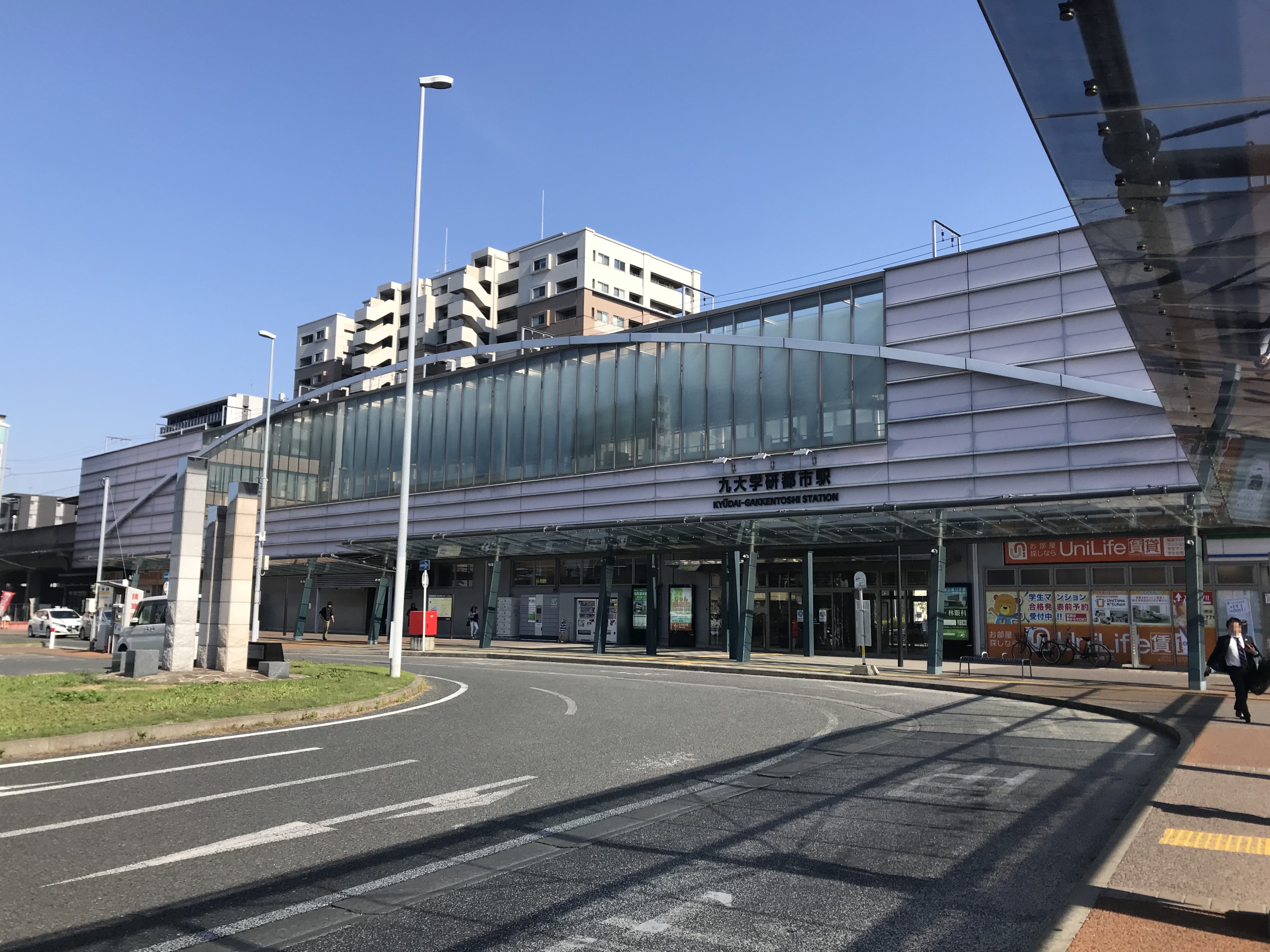
- Kyūdai-Gakkentoshi Station in May 2019

General information
- Location: 1-chōme-1 Kitabaru, Nishi-ku, Fukuoka-shi, Fukuoka-ken, 819-0379; Japan
- Coordinates: 33°34′41″N 130°15′36″E
- Operator: JR Kyushu
- Line: JK Chikuhi Line
- Distance: 6.5 km from Meinohama
- Platforms: 1 island platform
- Tracks: 2

Construction
- Structure type: Elevated
- Accessible: Yes - platform served by elevators

Other information
- Status: Staffed ticket window (Midori no Madoguchi) (outsourced)
- Website: Official website

History
- Opened: 23 September 2005; 21 years ago

Passengers
- FY2020: 6531 daily
- Rank: 19th (among JR Kyushu stations)

Services
Preceding station	JR Kyushu	Following station
Susenji towards Nishi-Karatsu	Chikuhi Line Local	Imajuku towards Meinohama
Location
- Location within Fukuoka Prefecture Location within Japan

Kyūdai-Gakkentoshi Station (九大学研都市駅, Kyūdai-Gakkentoshi-eki) is a passenger railway station located in Tokunaga, Nishi-ku, Fukuoka City, Fukuoka Prefecture, Japan. It is operated by JR Kyushu.

== Lines ==
The station is served by the Chikuhi Line and is located 6.5 km from the starting point of the line at Meinohama. Local and rapid services on the Chikuhi Line stop at this station.

== Station layout ==
The station consists of an island platform serving two elevated tracks. The station building has both a north and south entrance and houses a waiting area, a convenience store and a staffed ticket window. Access to the elevated island platform is by means of escalators and elevators.

Management of the station has been outsourced to the JR Kyushu Tetsudou Eigyou Co., a wholly owned subsidiary of JR Kyushu specialising in station services. It staffs the ticket counter which is equipped with a Midori no Madoguchi facility.

=== Platforms ===
1	■ JK Chikuhi Line	for Meinohama, Tenjin, Hakata, Fukuoka Airport
2	■ JK Chikuhi Line	for Chikuzen-Maebaru, Chikuzen-Fukae, Karatsu and Nishi-Karatsu

== History ==
JR Kyushu opened the station on 23 September 2005 as an additional station on the existing track of the Chikuhi Line.

== Passenger statistics ==
In fiscal 2020, the station was used by an average of 6531 passengers daily (boarding passengers only), and it ranked 19th among the busiest stations of JR Kyushu.

== Surrounding area ==
- Genyou High School
- Fukuoka-Maiduru High School and Junior High School
- Kyushu University Ito Campus (The station is named for the Kyushu University Ito Campus, but the university is approximately 4 km away from this station northwest. There is scheduled bus service to Ito Campus operated by Showa Bus.)

== See also ==
- List of railway stations in Japan
