= Chikuzen-Fukae Station =

Railway station in Itoshima, Fukuoka Prefecture, Japan

JK 12 Chikuzen-Fukae Station 筑前深江駅
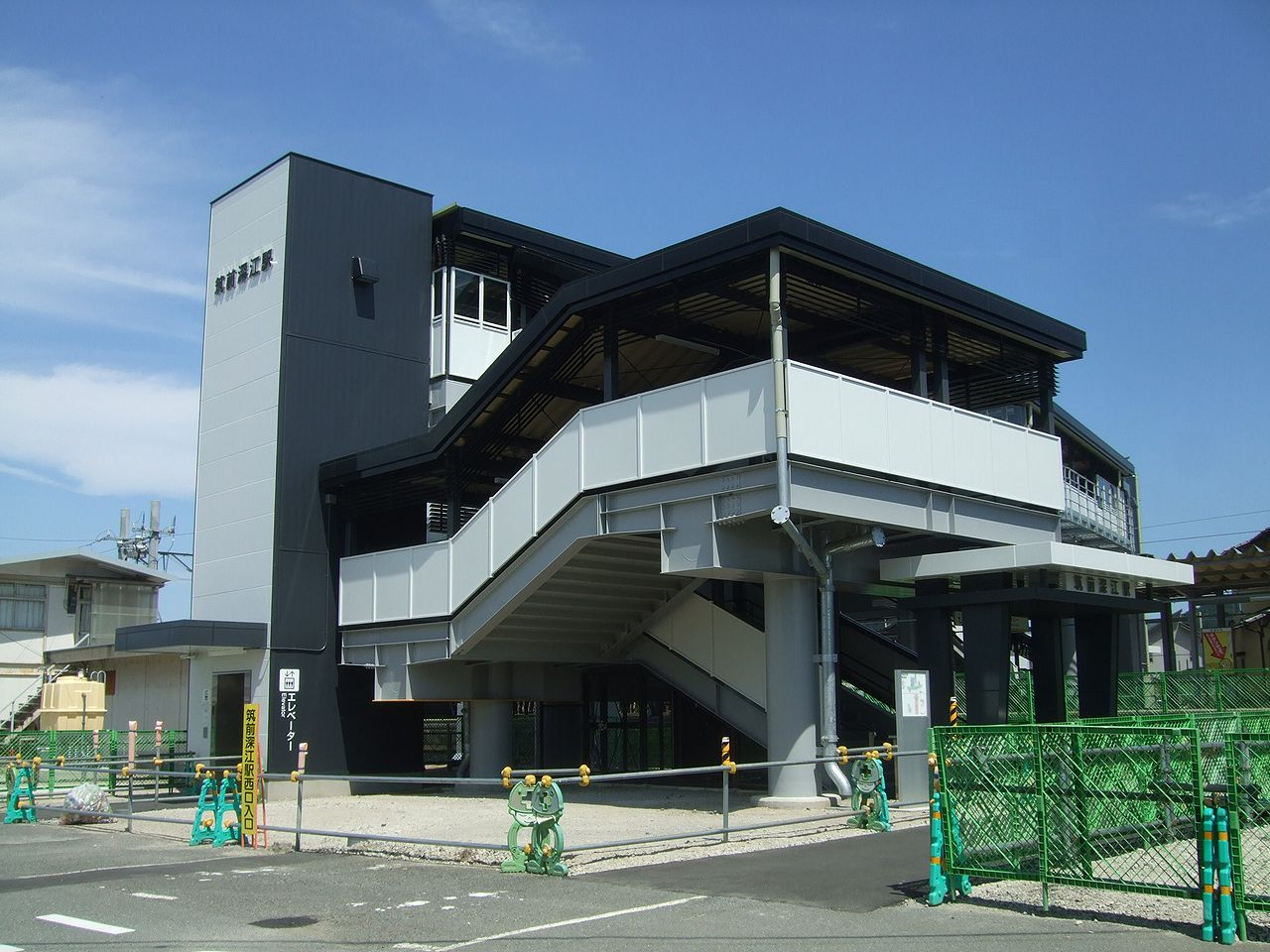
- Chikuzen-Fukae Station, May 2018

General information
- Location: 7-chōme-25 Nijōfukae, Itoshima-shi, Fukuoka-ken 819-1601; Japan
- Coordinates: 33°30′54.5″N 130°8′21″E
- Operator: JR Kyushu
- Line: JK Chikuhi Line
- Distance: 20.1 km from Meinohama
- Platforms: 1 island platform

Construction
- Structure type: elevated

Other information
- Status: Staffed
- Website: Official website

History
- Opened: 1 April 1924

Passengers
- FY2020: 701 daily
- Rank: 181st (among JR Kyushu stations)

Services
Preceding station	JR Kyushu	Following station
Dainyū towards Nishi-Karatsu	Chikuhi Line Local	Ikisan towards Meinohama
Location
- Location within Fukuoka Prefecture Location within Japan

Chikuzen-Fukae Station (筑前深江駅, Chikuzen-Fukae-eki) is a passenger railway station located in Nijō-Fukae, in the city of Itoshima, Fukuoka Prefecture, Japan. It is operated by Kyushu Railway Company (JR Kyushu). This station is where through-service trains from the Fukuoka City Subway Airport Line (Airport Line) normally terminate.

== Lines ==
The station is served by the Chikuhi Line and is located 20.1 km from the starting point of the line at Meinohama.

== Station layout ==
The station consists of an island platform serving two tracks with an elevated station building. The station is staffed.

=== Platforms ===
station side	■ JK Chikuhi Line	for Chikuzen-Maebaru, Tenjin and Hakata
opposite side	■ JK Chikuhi Line	for Karatsu and Nishi-Karatsu

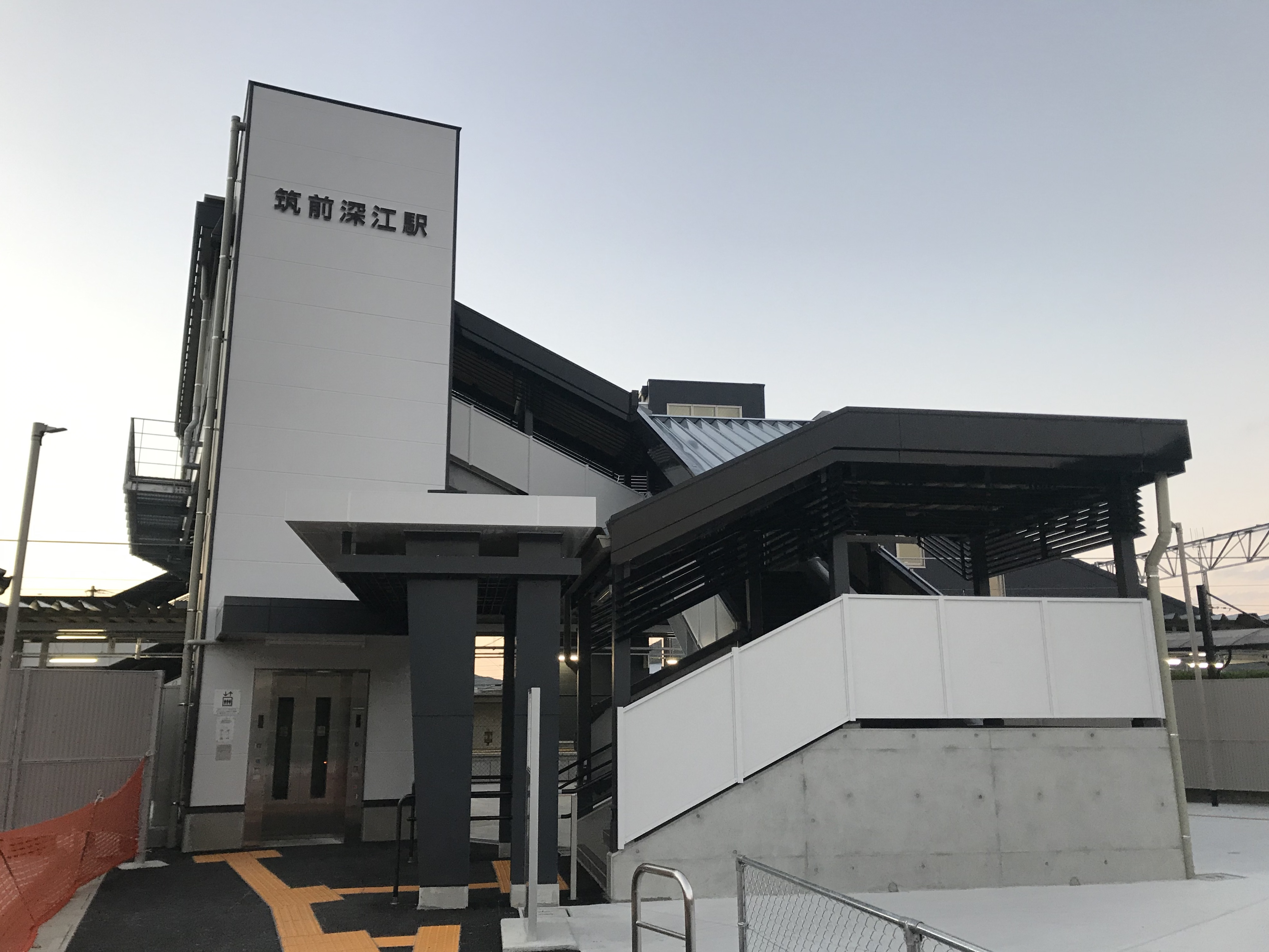
South exit（November 2018）

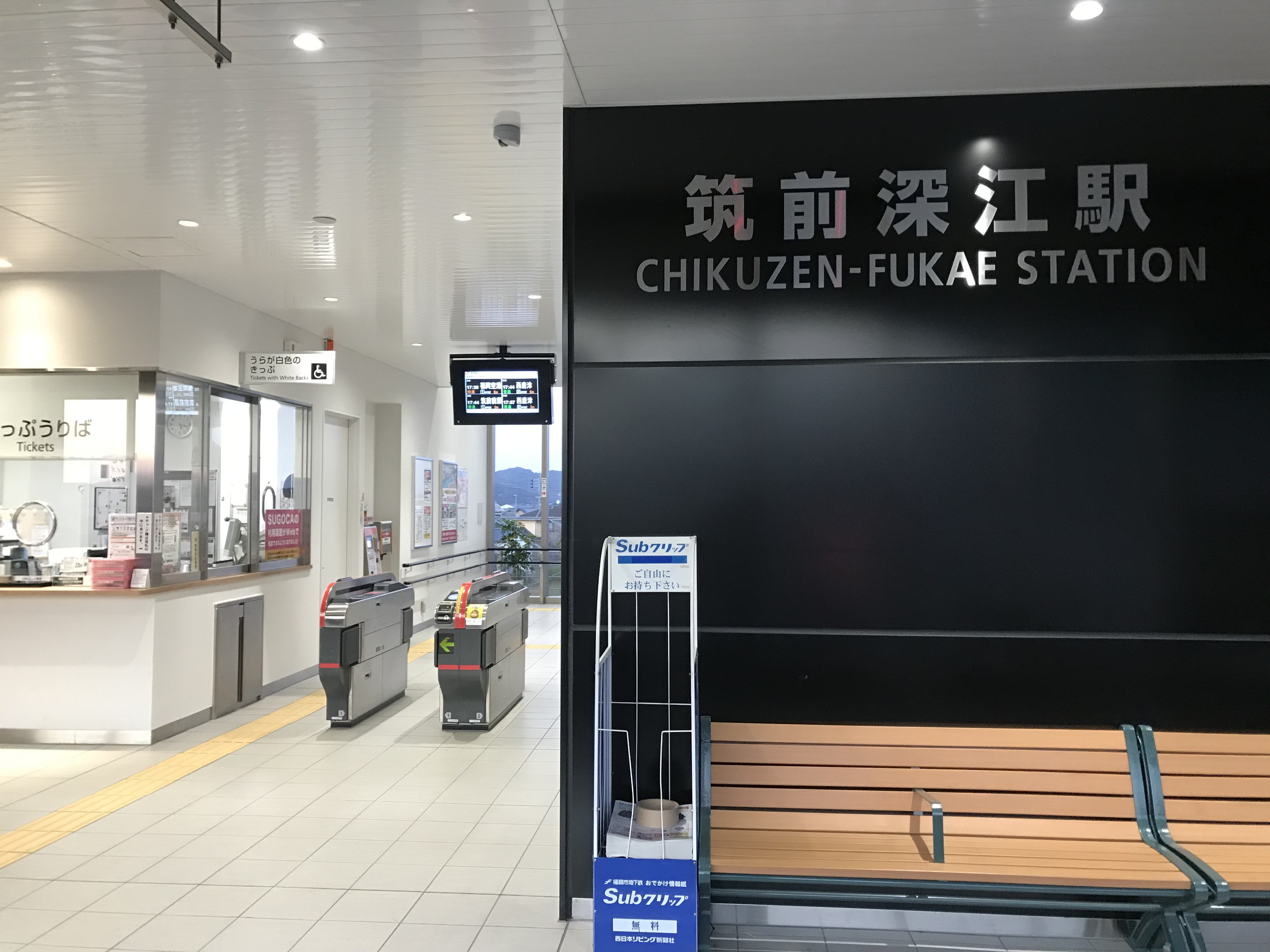
Wicket Gate（November 2018）

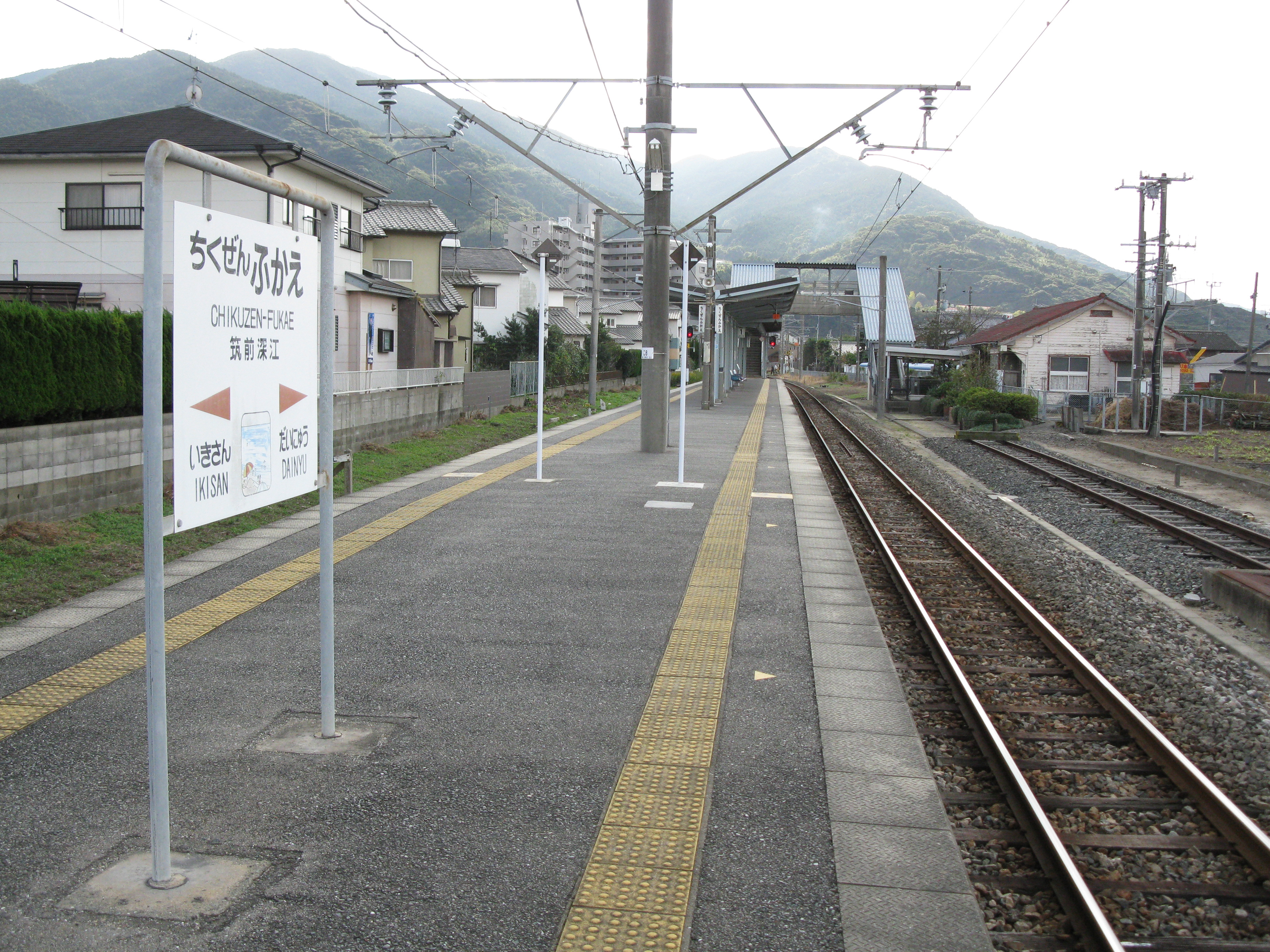
Platform（November 2009）

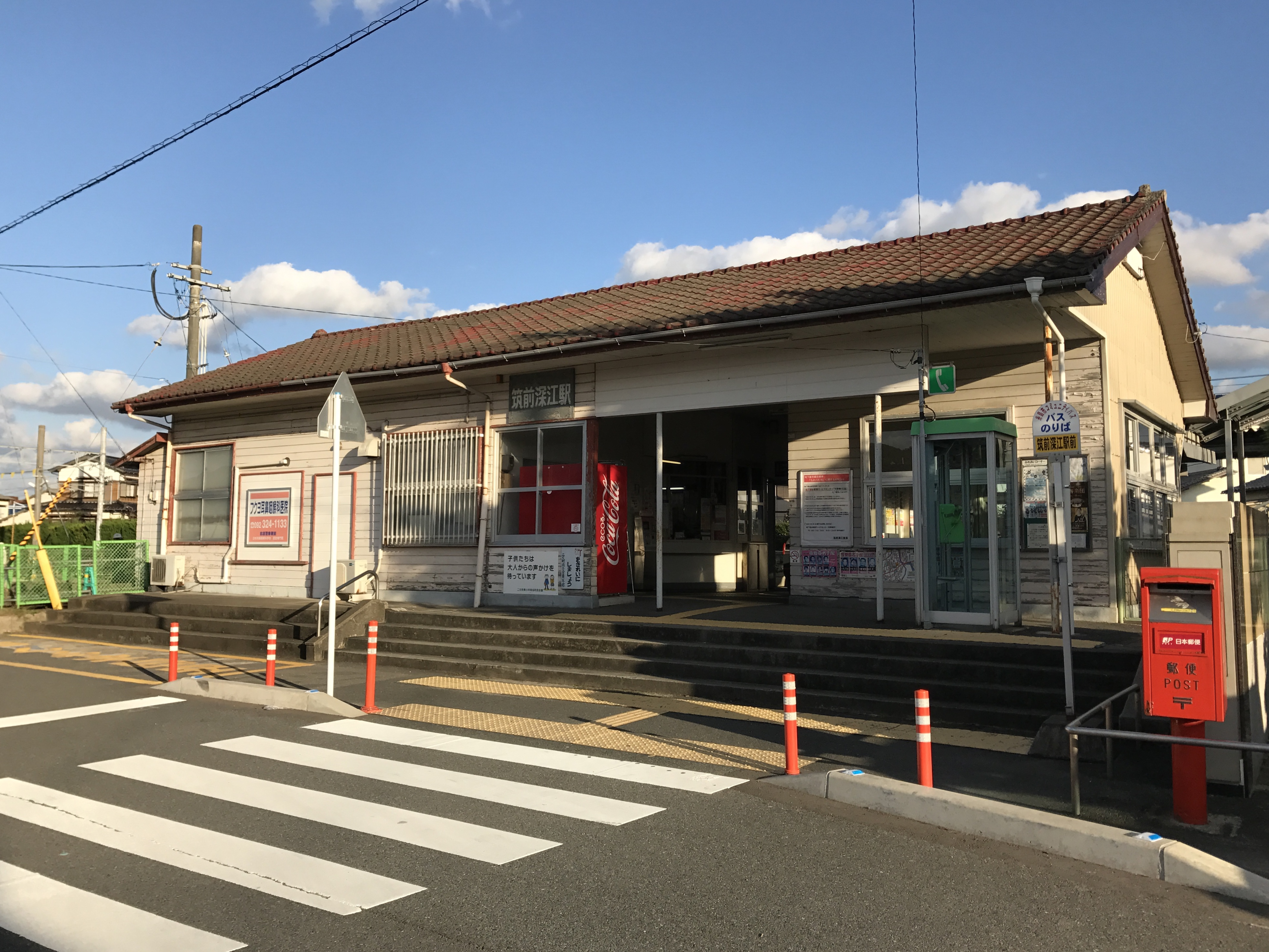
Former station building, demolished March 25, 2018

== History ==
The private Kitakyushu Railway opened a track between Fukuyoshi and Hamasaki on 5 December 1923 with Chikuzen-Fukae opening as an intermediate station between the two on 1 April 1924. When the Kitakyushu Railway was nationalized on 1 October 1937, Japanese Government Railways (JGR) took over control of the station and designated the line which served it as the Chikuhi Line. With the privatization of Japanese National Railways (JNR), the successor of JGR, on 1 April 1987, control of the station passed to JR Kyushu. The new station building and station passageway were opened on 26 March 2018.

== Passenger statistics ==
In fiscal 2020, the station was used by an average of 701 passengers daily (boarding passengers only), and it ranked 181st among the busiest stations of JR Kyushu.

== Surrounding area ==
- Itoshima City Office Nijō Branch (former Nijō Town Hall)
- Japan National Route 202

== See also ==
- List of railway stations in Japan
