= Misakigaoka Station =

Railway station in Itoshima, Fukuoka Prefecture, Japan

JK 09 Misakigaoka Station 美咲が丘駅
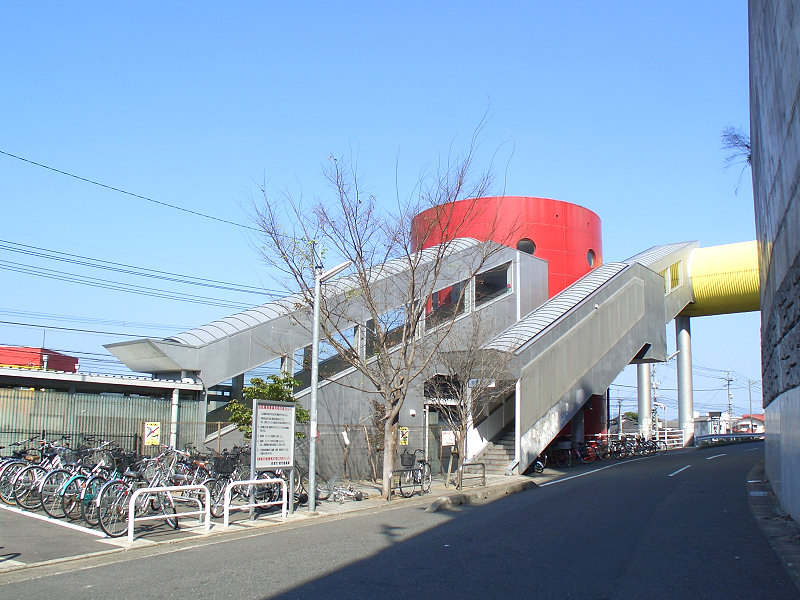
- Misakigaoka Station in 2006

General information
- Location: 4-chōme-8 Oginoura, Itoshima-shi, Fukuoka-ken 819-1121; Japan
- Coordinates: 33°33′0″N 130°11′8″E
- Operator: JR Kyushu
- Line: JK Chikuhi Line
- Distance: 14.3 km from Meinohama
- Platforms: 1 side platform
- Tracks: 1

Construction
- Structure type: At grade
- Cycle facilities: Bike shed
- Accessible: No - platforms accessed by footbridge

Other information
- Status: Staffed ticket window (outsourced)
- Website: Official website

History
- Opened: 28 October 1995; 30 years ago

Passengers
- FY2020: 819 daily
- Rank: 159th (among JR Kyushu stations)

Services
| Preceding station | JR Kyushu | Following station |
|---|---|---|
| Kafuri towards Nishi-Karatsu | Chikuhi Line Local | Chikuzen-Maebaru towards Meinohama |
Location
- Location within Fukuoka Prefecture Location within Japan

Misakigaoka Station (美咲が丘駅, Misakigaoka-eki) is a passenger railway station located in the city of Itoshima, Fukuoka Prefecture, Japan. It is operated by JR Kyushu.

== Lines ==
The station is served by the Chikuhi Line and is located 14.3 km from the starting point of the line at Meinohama. Only local services on the Chikuhi Line stop at this station.

== Station layout ==
The station consists of a side platform serving a single track. The station building is a modern structure in elevated format. It resembles a vertical red barrel built over the track and houses the ticket window. From there a flight of steps leads down to the platform. There are two entrances to the barrel shaped station building. From the access road, a flight of steps leads up to the red barrel. A second entrance is located in the environs of a residential area south of the station on higher ground. Here the entrance is a yellow tube-shaped tunnel which leads to a fight of steps connecting to the red barrel. Unlike most hashigami designs, it is not possible to enter the station building from the other side of the tracks.

Management of the station has been outsourced to the JR Kyushu Tetsudou Eigyou Co., a wholly owned subsidiary of JR Kyushu specialising in station services. It staffs the ticket counter which is equipped with a POS machine but does not have a Midori no Madoguchi facility.

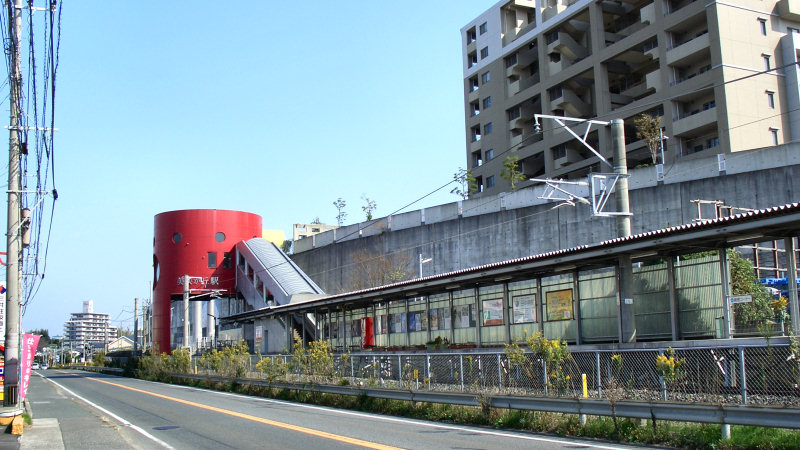
A view of the station looking from the north. Note the residential area on higher ground behind the retaining wall.

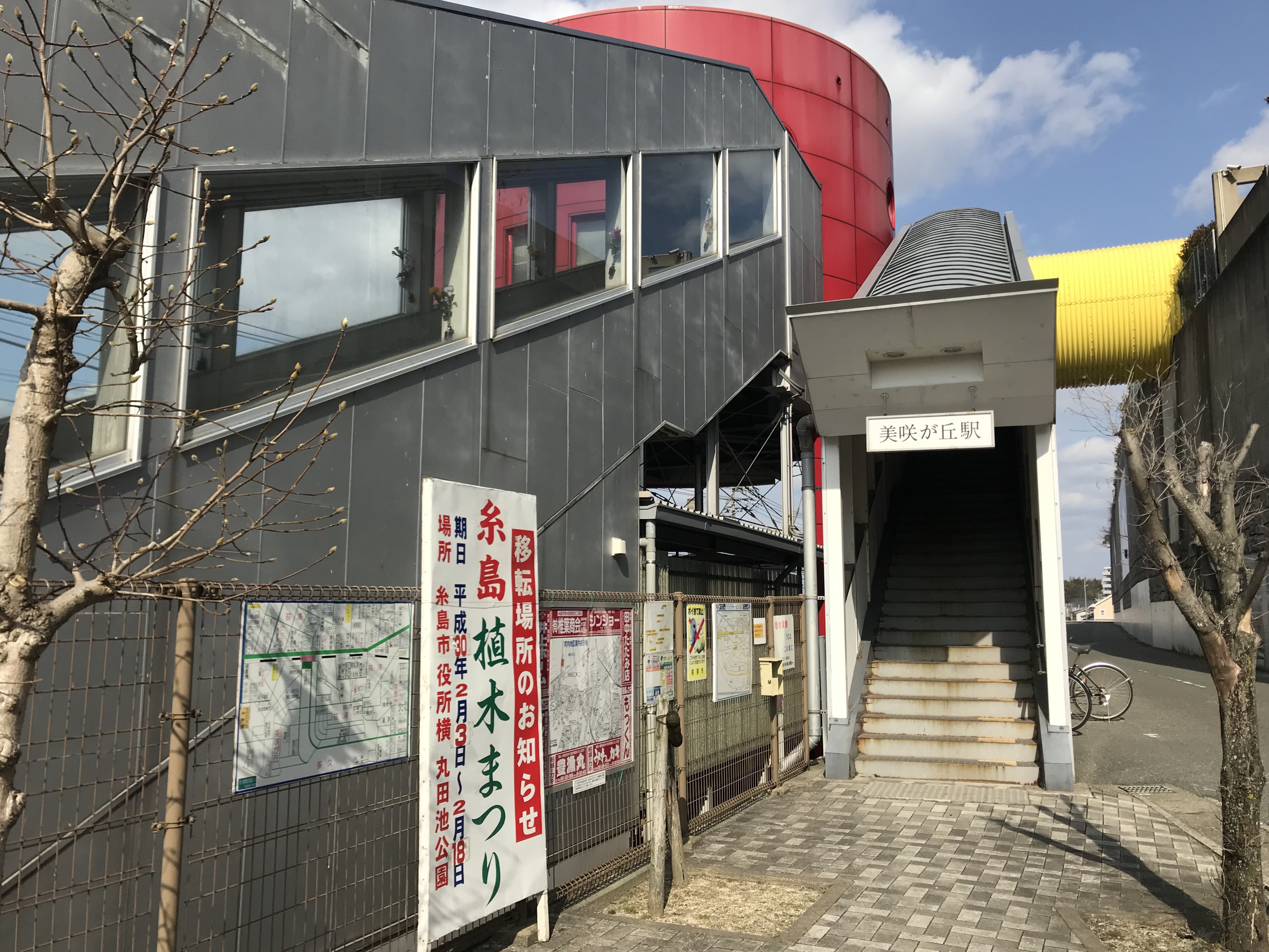
Entrance to the station building from the access road. Note the yellow tube leading to the other entrance.

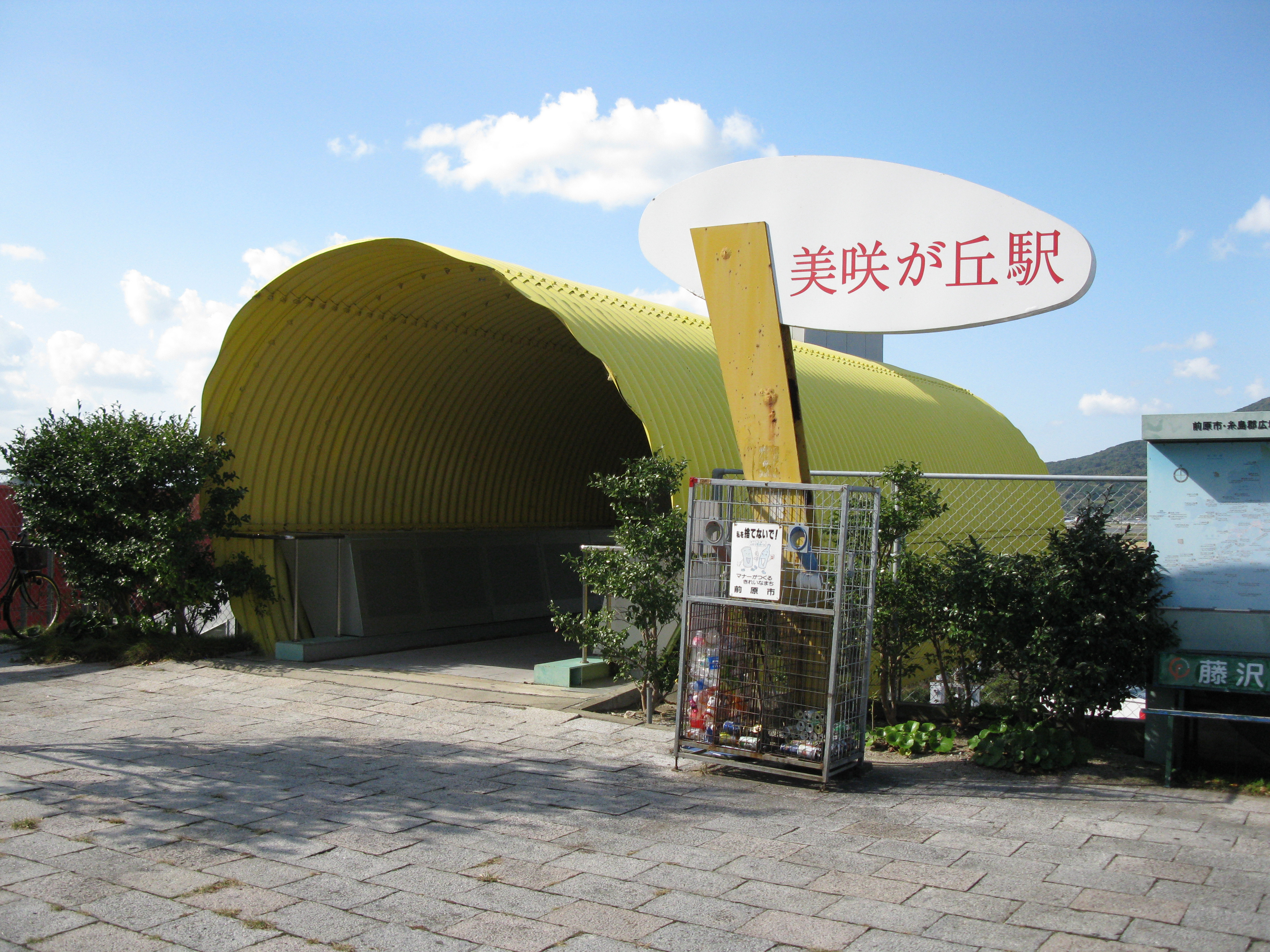
The entrance to the yellow tube which leads to the station.

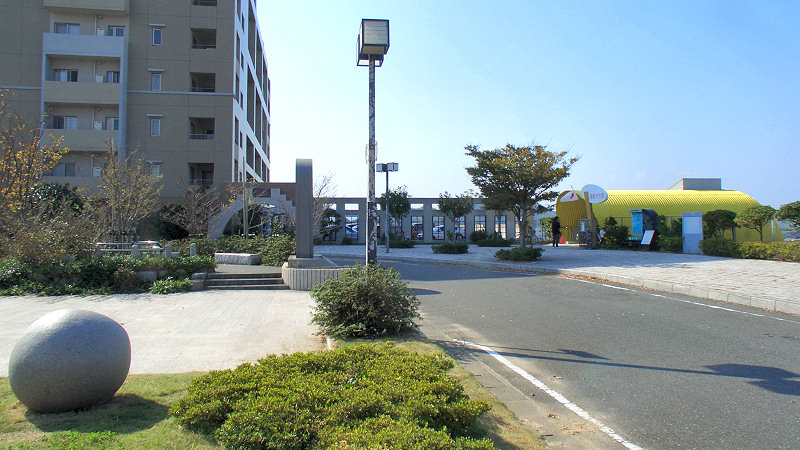
A distant view of the yellow tube. It crosses the station access road then leads down to the station building.

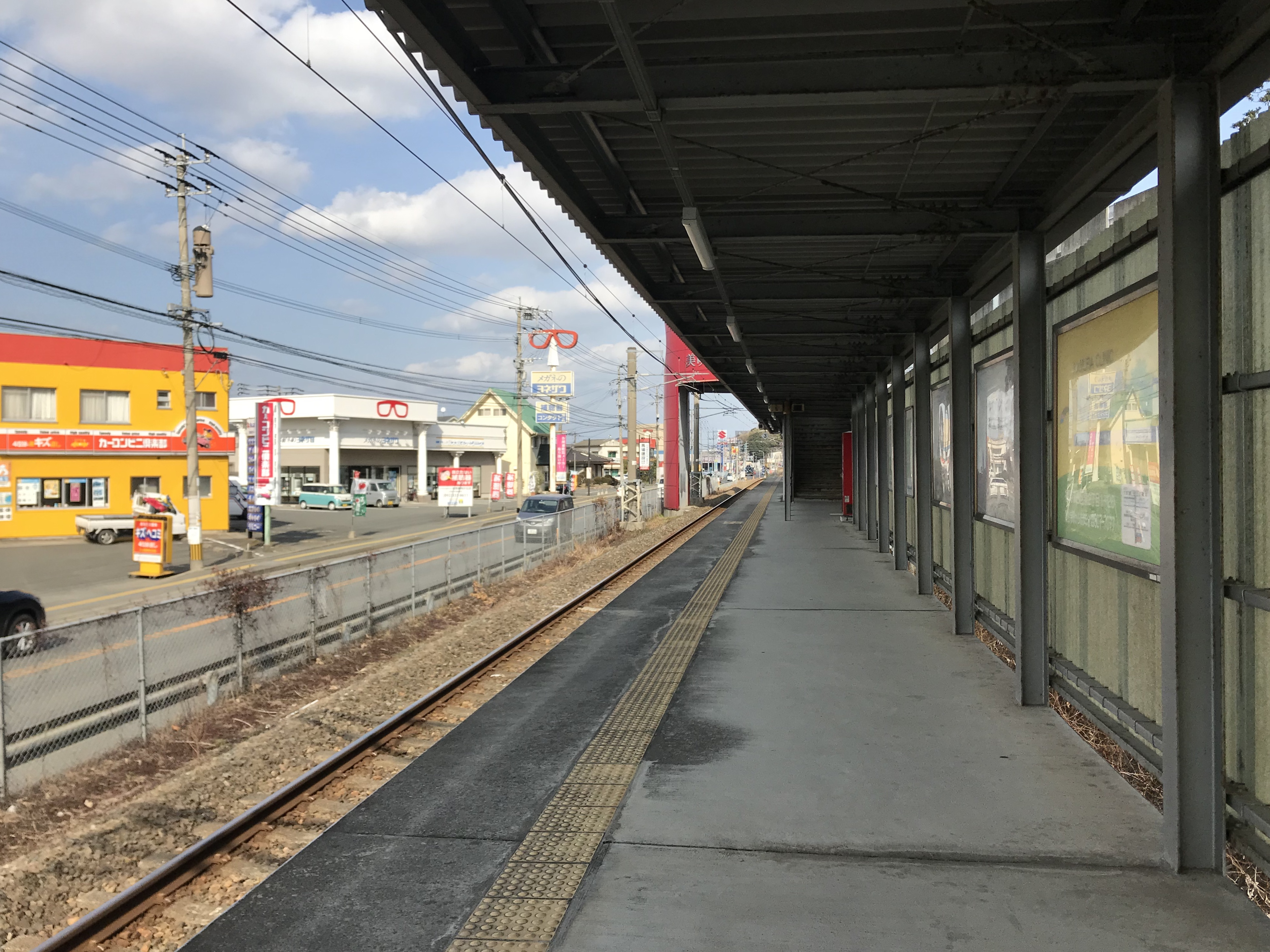
A view of the station platform. Note there is no entrance to the station from the main road on the north side of the track (to the left).

== History ==
JR Kyushu opened the station on 28 October 1995 as an additional station on the existing track of the Chikuhi Line.

== Passenger statistics ==
In fiscal 2020, the station was used by an average of 819 passengers daily (boarding passengers only), and it ranked 159th among the busiest stations of JR Kyushu.

== Surrounding area ==
- Japan National Route 202
- Itoshima City Maebaru Nishi Junior High School
- Itoshima City Minamikaze Elementary School

== See also ==
- List of railway stations in Japan
