= Ikisan Chōshizuka Kofun =

- 一貴山銚子塚古墳 (Japanese)
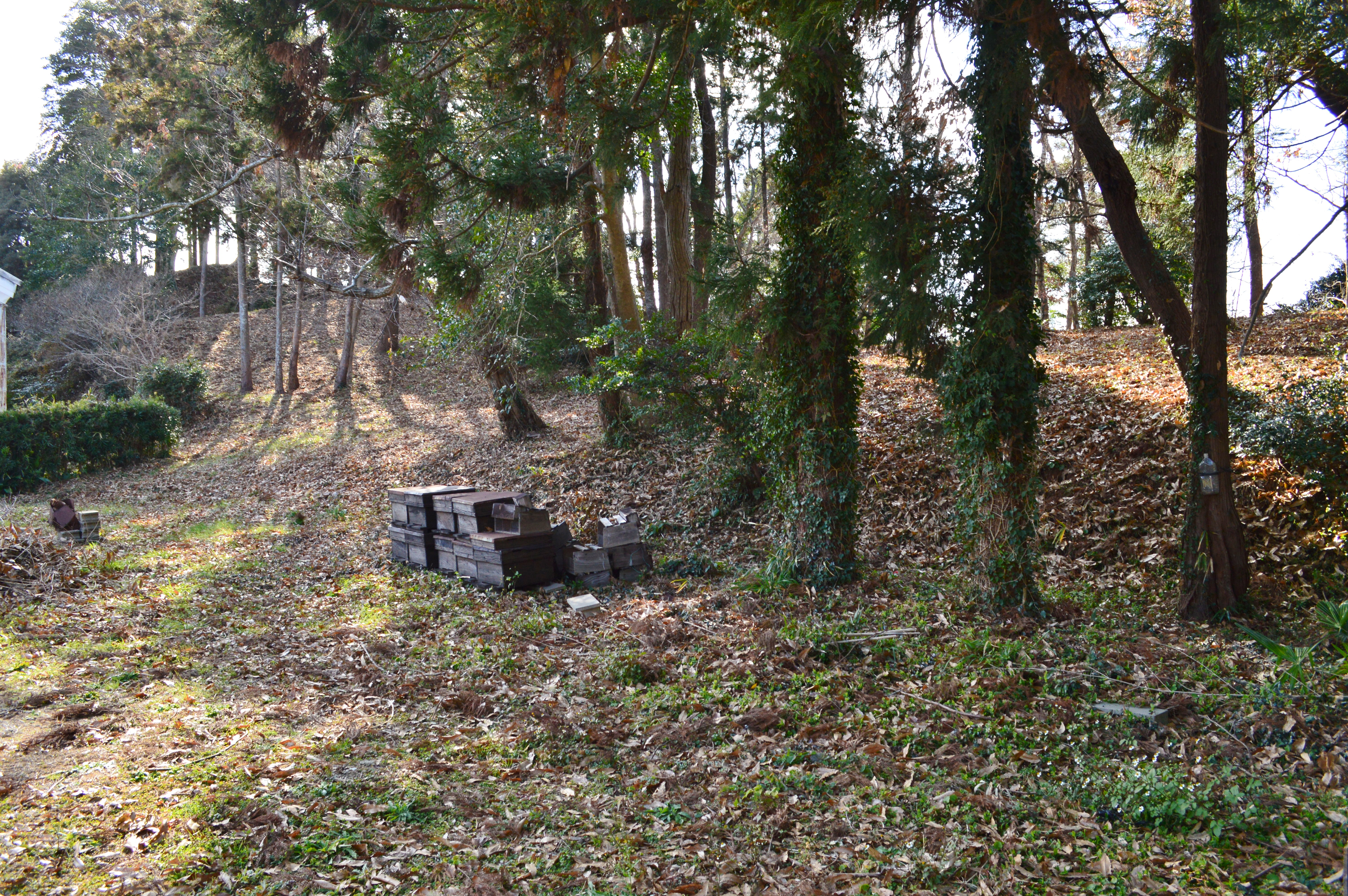
- Ikisan Chōshizuka Kofun

- Ikisan Chōshizuka Kofun Ikisan Chōshizuka Kofun (Japan)
- Interactive map of Ikisan Chōshizuka Kofun
- 33°32′12″N 130°10′11″E
- Type: Kofun
- Periods: Kofun period
- Location: Itoshima, Fukuoka, Japan
- Region: Kyushu

History
- Built: c.4th century

Site notes
- Public access: No

The Ikisan Chōshizuka Kofun (一貴山銚子塚古墳) is a Kofun period burial mound, located in the Nijo-Tanaka neighborhood of the city of Itoshima, Fukuoka Prefecture Japan. The tumulus was designated a National Historic Site of Japan in 1957. It is the largest kofun on the Genkai Sea coast.

== Overview ==
The Chōshizuka Kofun is a zenpō-kōen-fun (前方後円墳), which is shaped like a keyhole, having one square end and one circular end, when viewed from above. It is situated on a hill overlooking Karatsu Bay on the west bank near the mouth of the Nagano River that flows north. It has a total length of 103 meters, although it has somewhat lost its original shape. The posterior circular portion is estimated to have a diameter of 60 meters, and the width of the rectangular anterior portion is 31 meters, narrowing to 26 meters at the neck. The tumulus has no traces of fukiishi nor haniwa, and it is uncertain if it originally had a surrounding moat. In a 1950 archaeological excavation, it was discovered that a pit-style stone burial chamber remained in the rear circle, made of granite cobbles, with a length of 3.4 meters, width of 1.4 meters and height of 0.8 meters. The upper part was covered with basalt slabs and the floor was paved with stones. It was orientated diagonally to the main axis of the tumulus. Grave goods included ten bronze mirrors, magatama beads, cylindrical beads, iron swords, spears, and arrowheads. One of the square-shaped four divine mirrors and one mirror with inner flower patterns are placed near the head of the coffin, and date from the middle to late Han Dynasty. The four triangular-rimmed divine and beast mirrors were made in Japan and were placed on the left and right side edges. Currently, most of the excavated items are stored at the Kyoto University Museum. From the style of the tumulus and the grave goods, it is estimated that this tumulus was constructed in the later 4th century.

The tumulus is located approximately 450 meter northeast of Ikisan Station on the JR Kyushu Chikuhi Line.

== See also ==
- List of Historic Sites of Japan (Fukuoka)
