= Fukuyoshi Station =

Railway station in Itoshima, Fukuoka Prefecture, Japan

JK 14 Fukuyoshi Station 福吉駅
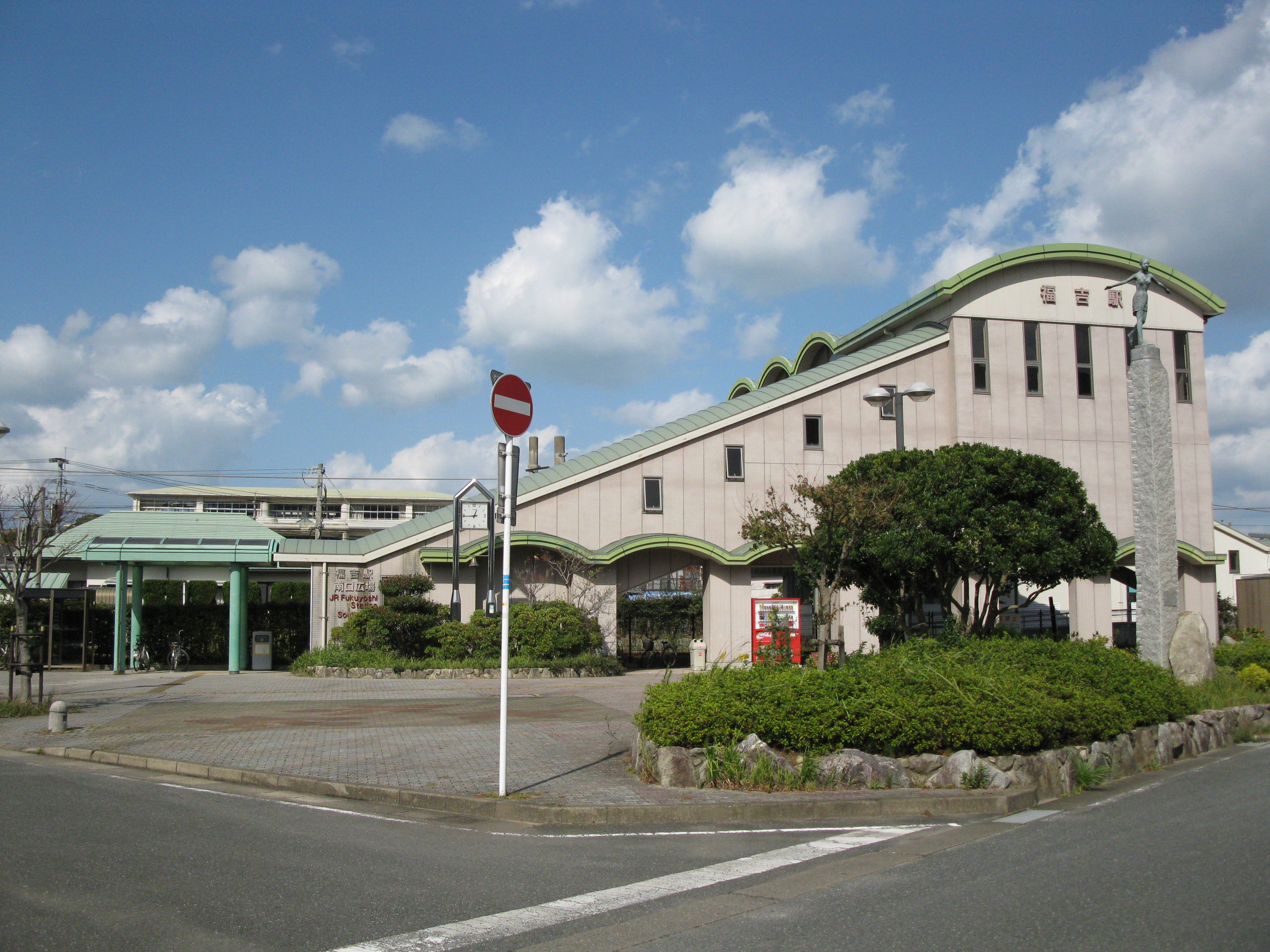
- The South entrance of Fukuyoshi Station in 2009

General information
- Location: Nijoyoshii, Itoshima-shi, Fukuoka-ken 819-1641; Japan
- Coordinates: 33°30′06″N 130°04′46″E
- Operator: JR Kyushu
- Line: JK Chikuhi Line
- Distance: 26.1 km from Meinohama
- Platforms: 1 island platform
- Tracks: 2 + 1 siding

Construction
- Structure type: At grade
- Accessible: No - platforms accessed from elevated station with steps

Other information
- Status: Unstaffed
- Website: Official website

History
- Opened: 5 December 1923

Passengers
- FY2020: 349 daily
- Rank: 255th (among JR Kyushu stations)

Services
Preceding station	JR Kyushu	Following station
Shikaka towards Nishi-Karatsu	Chikuhi Line Local	Dainyū towards Meinohama
Location
- Location within Fukuoka Prefecture Location within Japan

Fukuyoshi Station (福吉駅, Fukuyoshi-eki) is a passenger railway station located in the city of Itoshima, Fukuoka Prefecture, Japan. It is operated by JR Kyushu.

== Lines ==
The station is served by the Chikuhi Line and is located 26.1 km from the starting point of the line at Meinohama. Only local services on the Chikuhi Line stop at this station.

== Station layout ==
The station consists of an unnumbered island platform serving two tracks with a siding. The station building is an elevated structure which spans the tracks and has separate entrances north and south of the tracks. The waiting room is positioned on the bridge above the platform. The ticket window, also on the bridge, is unstaffed. From the bridge, a ticket gate equipped with a Sugoca card reader stands at the top of a flight of steps which leads down to the platform.

=== Platforms ===
North	■ JK Chikuhi Line	for Chikuzen-Maebaru, Tenjin and Hakata
South	■ JK Chikuhi Line	for Karatsu and Nishi-Karatsu

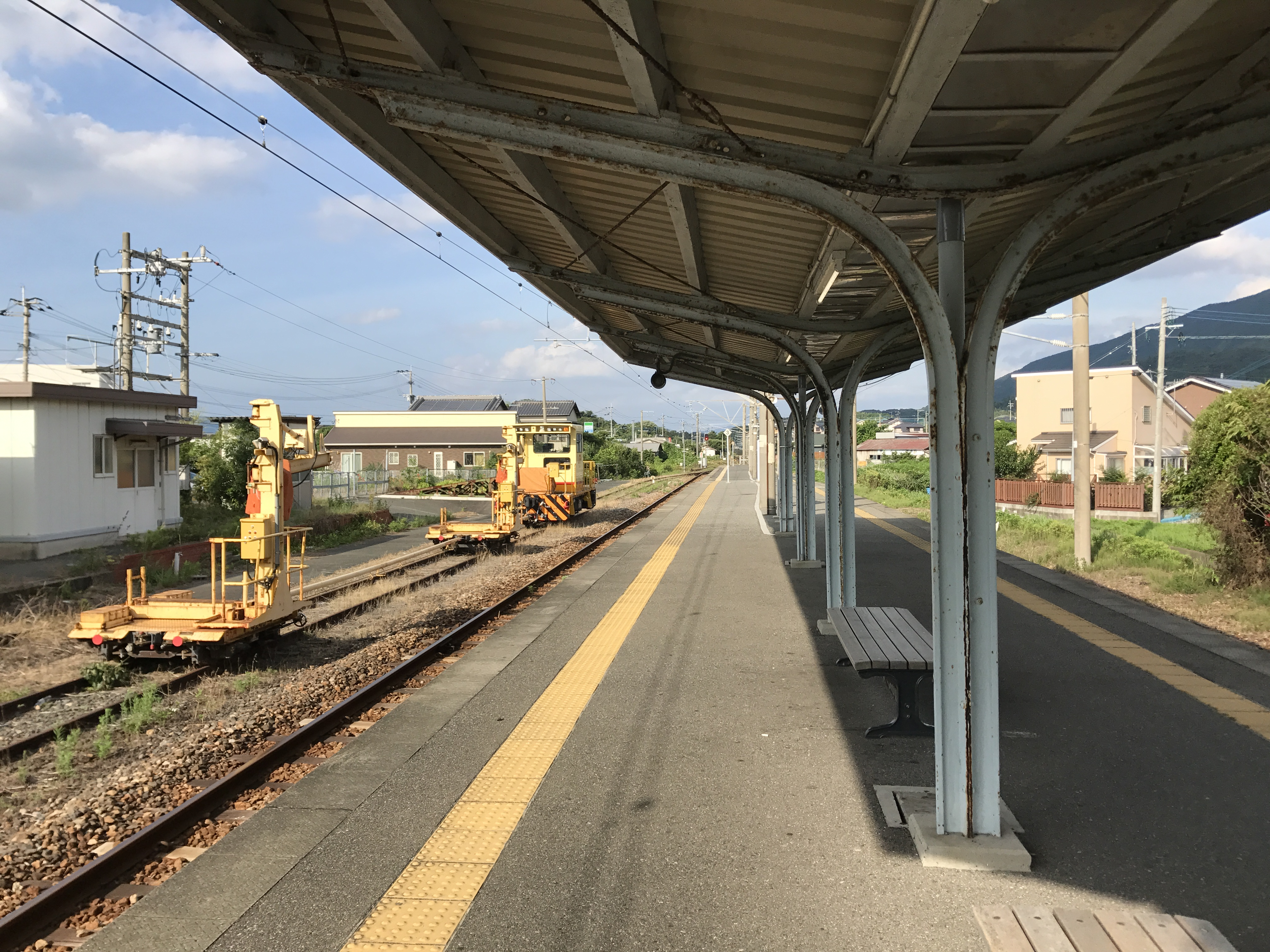
A view of the platform and tracks, looking east, in the direction of Meinohama. Note the siding.

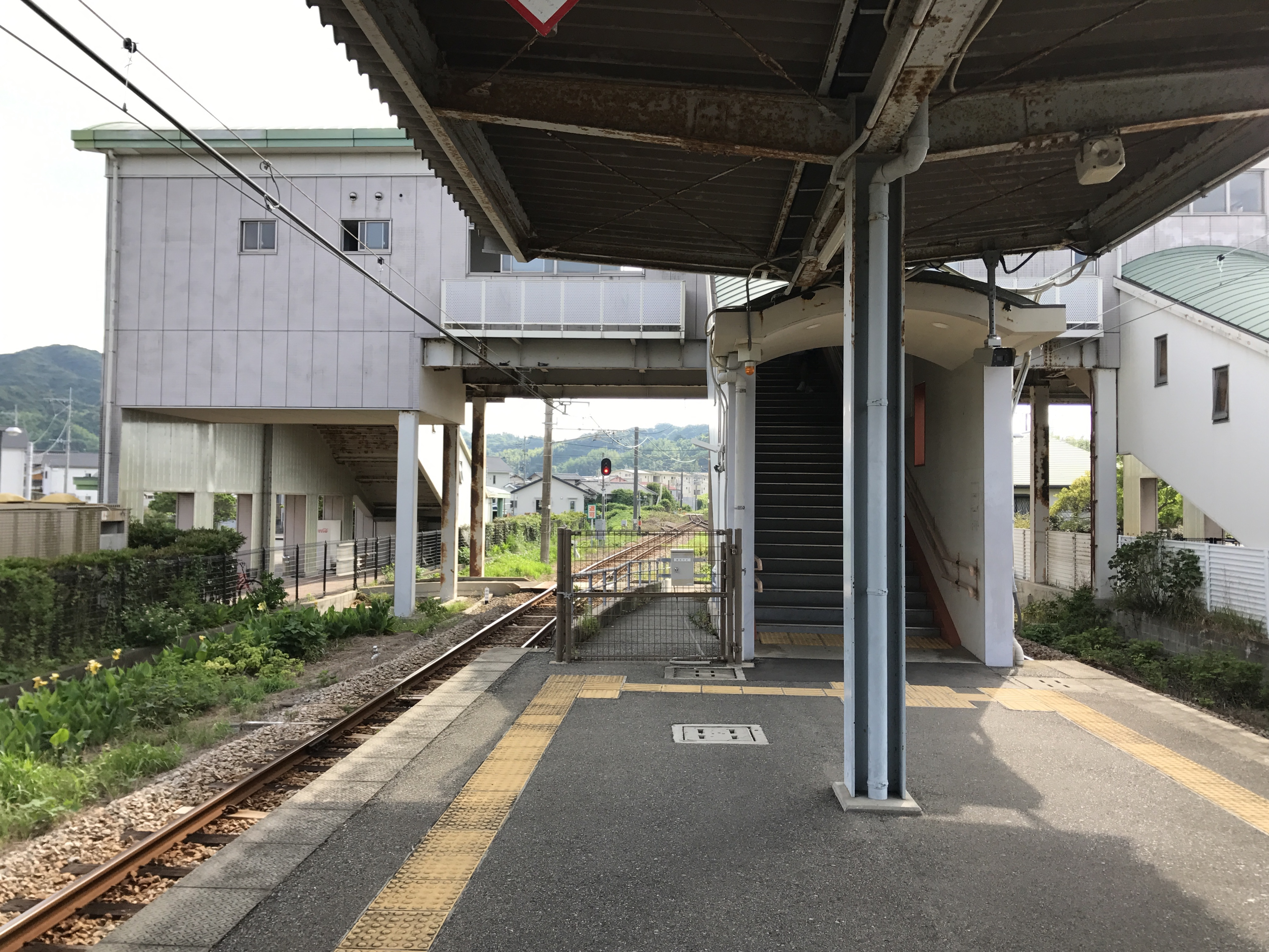
The station platform looking west. Note the stairwell leading to the station building above the tracks and also the station entrances (stairwells) on both sides.

== History ==
The station was opened on 5 December 1923 as the eastern terminus of a line which the private Kitakyushu Railway had built to Hamasaki. Fukuyoshi became a through-station on 1 April 1924 when the track was extended east to Maebaru (today Chikuzen-Maebaru). When the Kitakyushu Railway was nationalized on 1 October 1937, Japanese Government Railways (JGR) took over control of the station and designated the line which served it as the Chikuhi Line. With the privatization of Japanese National Railways (JNR), the successor of JGR, on 1 April 1987, control of the station passed to JR Kyushu.

== Passenger statistics ==
In fiscal 2020, the station was used by an average of 349 passengers daily (boarding passengers only), and it ranked 255th among the busiest stations of JR Kyushu.

== Surrounding area ==
- Japan National Route 202

== See also ==
- List of railway stations in Japan
