= Hamasaki Station =

Railway station in Karatsu, Saga Prefecture, Japan

Hamasaki Station 浜崎駅
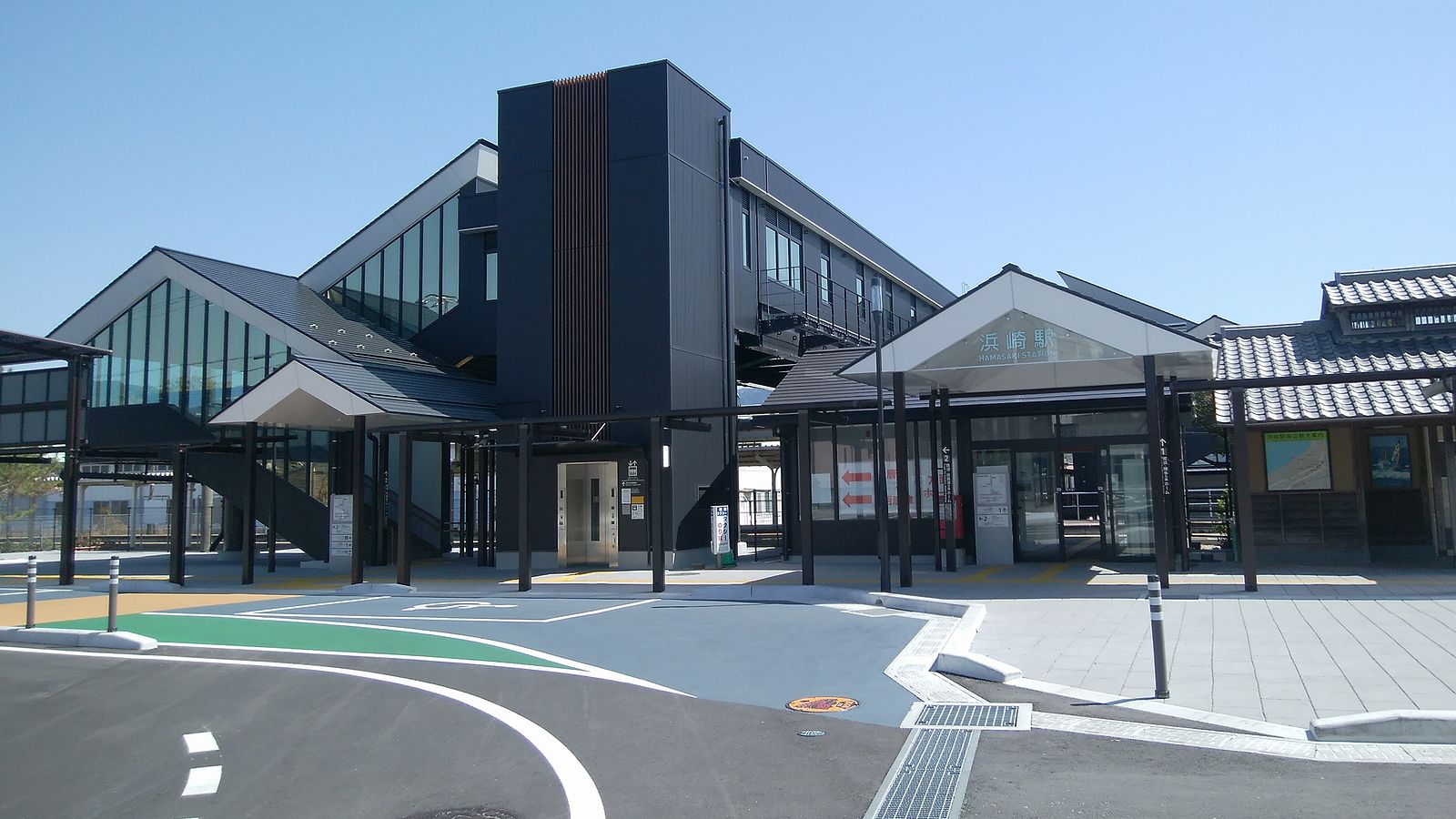
- Hamasaki Station in 2022

General information
- Location: 108-3, Hamatama-chō Hamasaki, Karatsu-shi, Saga-ken 849-5131; Japan
- Coordinates: 33°26′49″N 130°02′12″E
- Operator: JR Kyushu
- Line: JK Chikuhi Line
- Distance: 35.4 km from Meinohama
- Platforms: 2 side platforms
- Tracks: 2 + 1 siding

Construction
- Structure type: At grade
- Cycle facilities: Bike shed
- Accessible: Yes

Other information
- Status: Staffed ticket window (outsourced)
- Website: Official website

History
- Opened: 5 December 1923; 102 years ago
- Rebuilt: 2022

Passengers
- FY2020: 464 daily
- Rank: 225th (among JR Kyushu stations)

Services
Preceding station	JR Kyushu	Following station
Nijinomatsubara towards Nishi-Karatsu	Chikuhi Line Local	Shikaka towards Meinohama
Location
- Location within Saga Prefecture Location within Japan

Hamasaki Station (浜崎駅, Hamasaki-eki) is a passenger railway station located in the city of Karatsu, Saga Prefecture, Japan. It is operated by JR Kyushu and is on the Chikuhi Line.

== Lines ==
The station is served by the Chikuhi Line and is located 35.4 km from the starting point of the line at Meinohama. Rapid and local services on the Chikuhi Line stop at this station.

== Station layout ==
The station consists of two side platforms two tracks with a siding. The station building was a timber structure of traditional design, but was replaced by modern structure in 2022. It houses a waiting room and a staffed ticket window. Access to the opposite side platform is by means of a footbridge. A bike shed is provided outside.

Management of the station has been outsourced to the JR Kyushu Tetsudou Eigyou Co., a wholly owned subsidiary of JR Kyushu specialising in station services. It staffs the ticket counter which is equipped with a POS machine but does not have a Midori no Madoguchi facility.

=== Platforms ===
1	■ JK Chikuhi Line	for Chikuzen-Maebaru and Hakata
2	■ JK Chikuhi Line	for Karatsu and Nishi-Karatsu

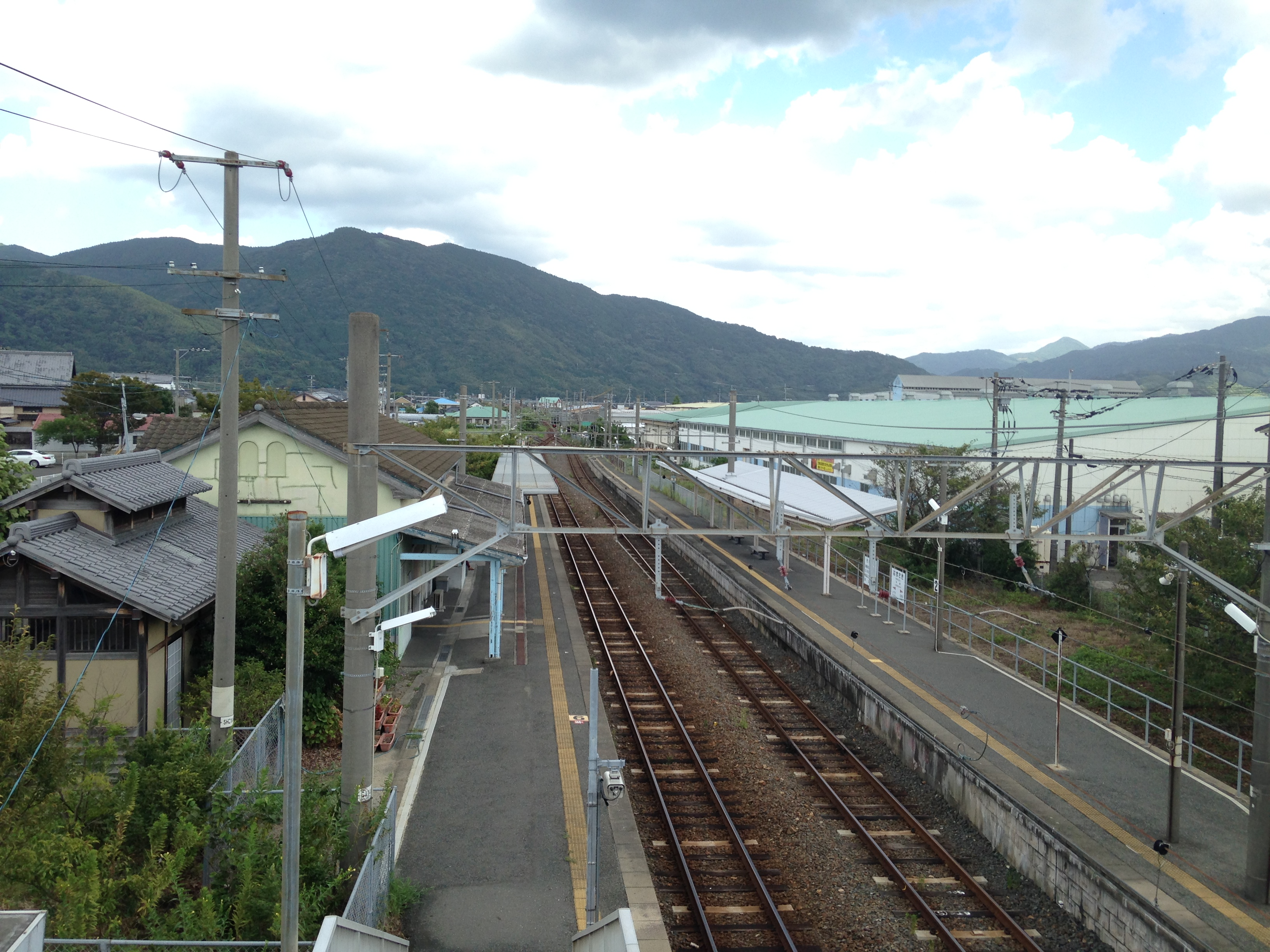
A view of the station platforms and tracks.

== History ==
The station was opened on 5 December 1923 as the western terminus of a line which the private Kitakyushu Railway had built from Fukuyoshi. Hamasaki became a through-station on 7 July 1924 when the track was extended west to Nijinomatsubara. When the Kitakyushu Railway was nationalized on 1 October 1937, Japanese Government Railways (JGR) took over control of the station and designated the line which served it as the Chikuhi Line. With the privatization of Japanese National Railways (JNR), the successor of JGR, on 1 April 1987, control of the station passed to JR Kyushu.

== Passenger statistics ==
In fiscal 2020, the station was used by an average of 464 passengers daily (boarding passengers only), and it ranked 225th among the busiest stations of JR Kyushu.

== Surrounding area ==
- Karatsu City Hall Hamatama Branch Office
- Hamasaki Post Office
- Hamasaki Beach

== See also ==
- List of railway stations in Japan
