= Chikuzen-Maebaru Station =

Railway station in Itoshima, Fukuoka Prefecture, Japan

JK 08 Chikuzen-Maebaru Station 筑前前原駅
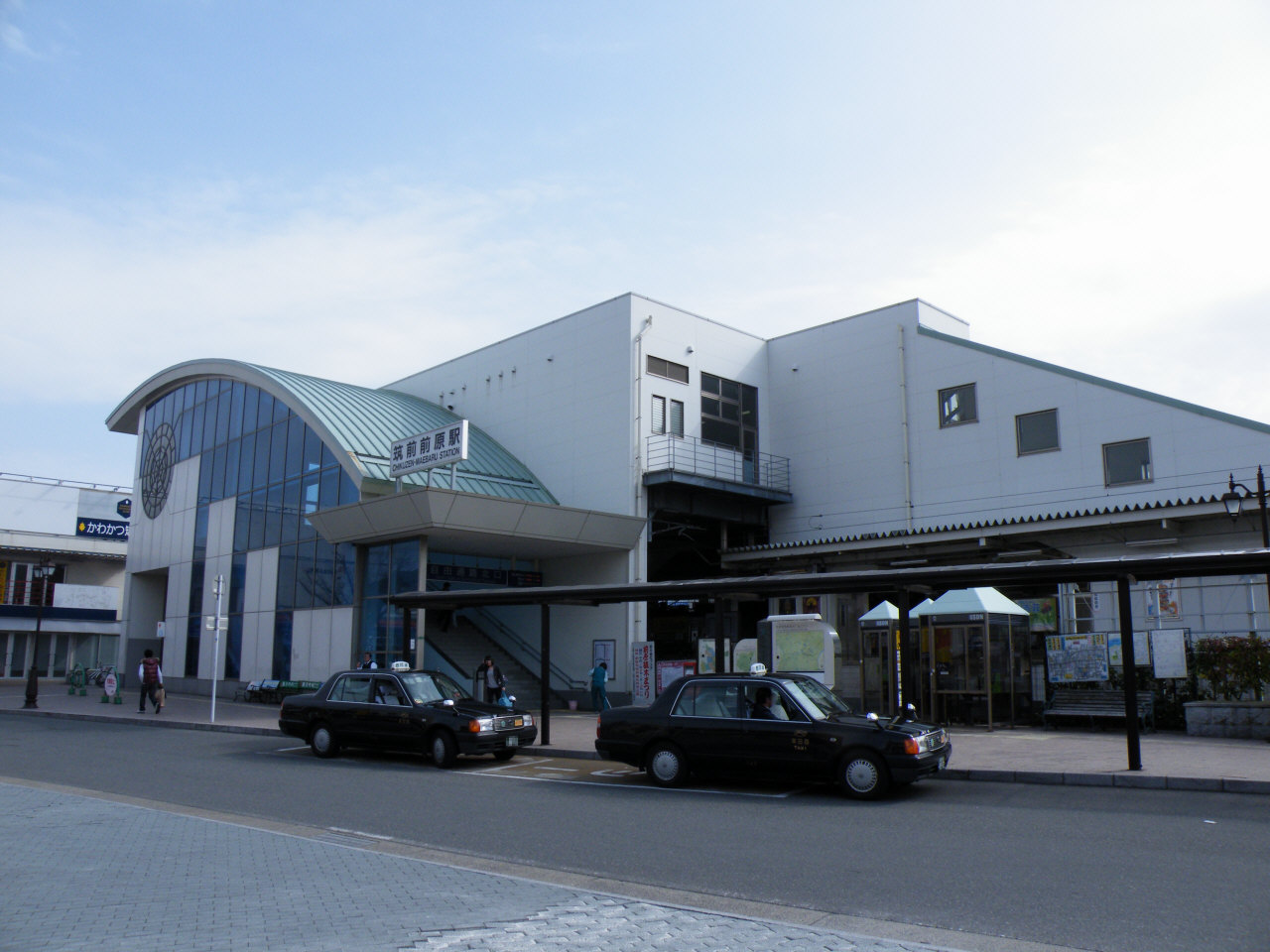
- The north entrance of Chikuzen-Maebaru Station in 2009

General information
- Location: 1-1-15 Maehara Chuo, Itoshima-shi, Fukuoka-ken 819-1116; Japan
- Coordinates: 33°33′26″N 130°11′56″E
- Operator: JR Kyushu
- Line: JK Chikuhi Line
- Distance: 12.7 km from Meinohama
- Platforms: 2 island platforms
- Tracks: 4

Construction
- Structure type: At grade
- Cycle facilities: Bike shed
- Accessible: Yes - elevators to platform level

Other information
- Status: JR Kyushu ticket window (Midori no Madoguchi)
- Website: Official website

History
- Opened: 1 April 1924; 102 years ago
- Former names: Maebaru (until 1 October 1937)

Passengers
- FY2020: 5364 daily
- Rank: 23rd (among JR Kyushu stations)

Services
Preceding station	JR Kyushu	Following station
Misakigaoka towards Nishi-Karatsu	Chikuhi Line Local	Itoshimakōkō-mae towards Meinohama
Location
- Location within Fukuoka Prefecture Location within Japan

Chikuzen-Maebaru Station (筑前前原駅, Chikuzen-Maebaru-eki) is a passenger railway station located in the city of Itoshima, Fukuoka Prefecture, Japan. It is operated by JR Kyushu.

== Lines ==
The station is served by the Chikuhi Line and is located 12.7 km from the starting point of the line at Meinohama. Both local and rapid services on the Chikuhi Line stop at this station.

== Station layout ==
The station consists of two island platforms serving four tracks. The station building is a modern elevated structure where the station facilities are located on a bridge spanning the platforms and which has entrances north and south of the tracks. On the bridge are a waiting room, a shop and a ticket counter. After the ticket gates on the bridge, escalators descend to the two island platforms. Elevators are provided to platform level.

The ticket counter is staffed JR Kyushu directly and is equipped with a Midori no Madoguchi facility.

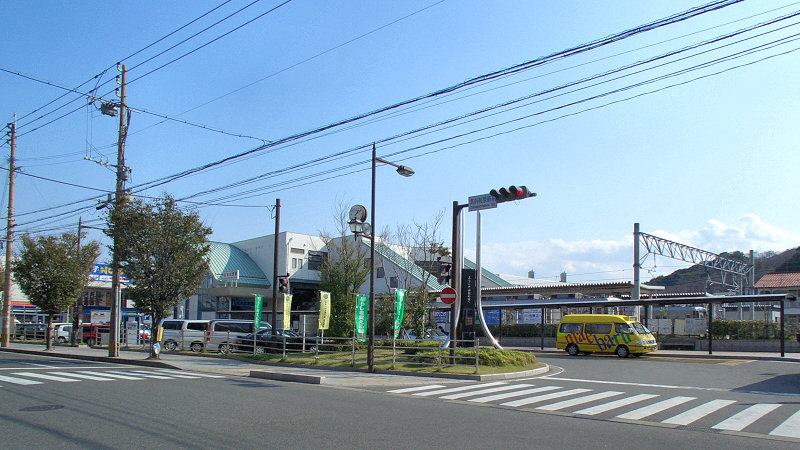
A more distant view of the north entrance, showing the escalators descending to the island platforms.

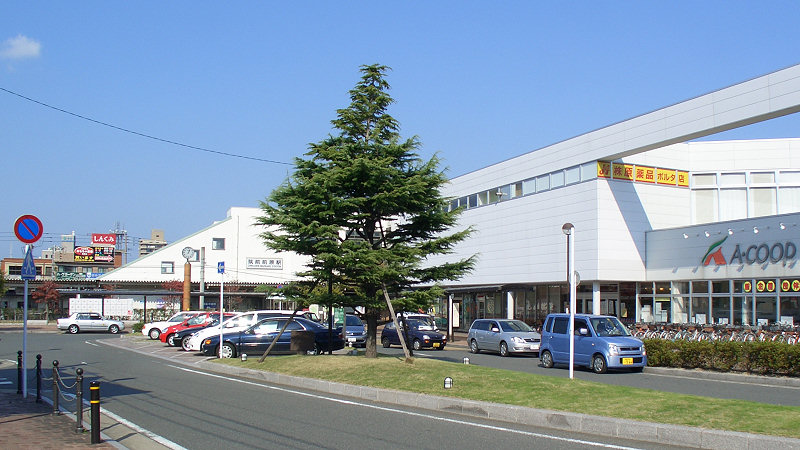
The south entrance of the station.

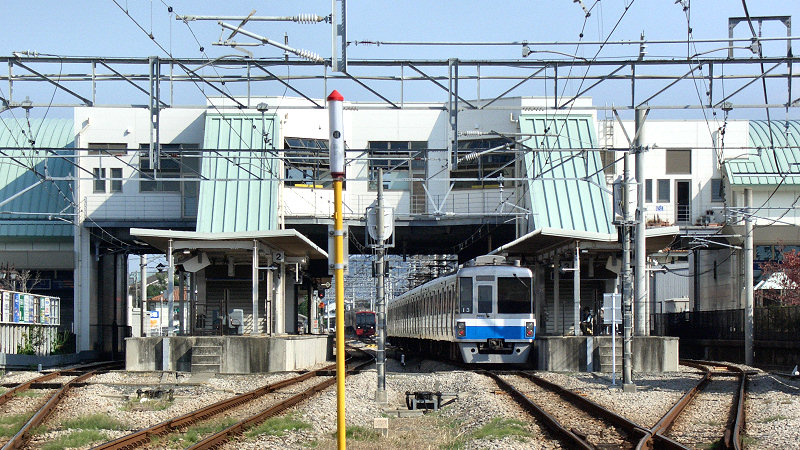
A view of the platforms. Note the station on the bridge above.

=== Platforms ===
1	■ JK Chikuhi Line	for Meinohama, Tenjin, Hakata and Fukuoka Airport
2	■ JK Chikuhi Line	for Nishijin, Tenjin, Hakata and Fukuoka Airport
3	■ JK Chikuhi Line	for Chikuzen-Fukae, Karatsu and Nishi-Karatsu
4	■ JK Chikuhi Line	for Chikuzen-Fukae, Karatsu and Nishi-Karatsu

== History ==
The private Kitakyushu Railway had opened a track between Fukuyoshi and Hamasaki on 5 December 1923. By 1 April 1924, the line had been extended east with the station, then named Maebaru opening as the new eastern terminus. On 15 April 1925, Maebaru became a through-station when the line was extended to Meinohama. When the Kitakyushu Railway was nationalized on 1 October 1937, Japanese Government Railways (JGR) took over control of the station and renamed it Chikuzen-Maebaru and designated the line which served it as the Chikuhi Line. With the privatization of Japanese National Railways (JNR), the successor of JGR, on 1 April 1987, control of the station passed to JR Kyushu.

== Passenger statistics ==
In fiscal 2020, the station was used by an average of 5,364 passengers daily (boarding passengers only), and it ranked 23rd among the busiest stations of JR Kyushu.

== Surrounding area ==
Located in the center of Itoshima City, Japan National Route 202 runs parallel to the Chikuhi Line about 300 meters north of the station. The prefectural road Chikuzen-Maebaru Station Line runs between the north exit and the intersection with National Route 202, and the prefectural road Fukuoka Shima-Maebaru Line extends from there to the north. The area around the north exit is Maebaru Chuo Shopping Street and there are many stores. The area around the south exit is a residential area.

- Itoshima City Hall Main Building (formerly Maebaru City Hall)
- Itoshima City Library
- Itoshima City Maehara Elementary School

== See also ==
- List of railway stations in Japan
