= Meinohama Station =

Railway and metro station in Fukuoka, Japan

JK 01 K01 Meinohama Station 姪浜駅
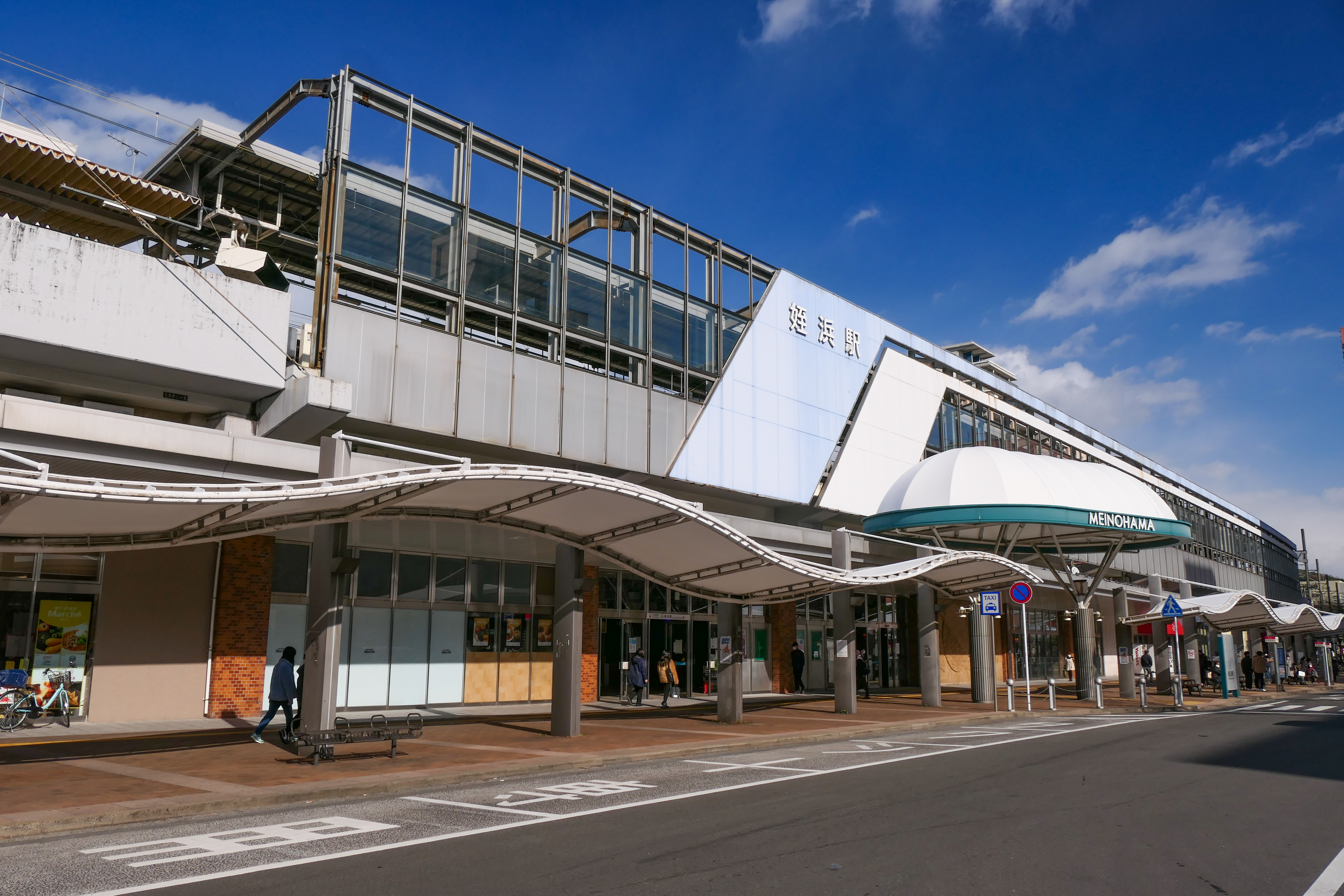
- South Exit in December 2021

General information
- Location: 4 Chome-8-1 Meinohama, Nishi-ku, Fukuoka-shi, Fukuoka-ken, 819-0002; Japan
- Coordinates: 33°35′1.33″N 130°19′30.85″E
- Operator: JR Kyushu; Fukuoka City Subway
- Lines: JK Chikuhi Line; Airport Line
- Platforms: 2 island platforms
- Connections: Bus terminal

Other information
- Station code: JK01; K01

History
- Opened: 15 April 1925

Passengers
- FY2020: 4590 daily (JR)
- Rank: 31st (among JR Kyushu stations)

Services
Preceding station	JR Kyushu	Following station
Kyūdai-Gakkentoshi JK 04 towards Nishi-Karatsu	Chikuhi Line Rapid	through to Airport Line
Shimoyamato JK 02 towards Nishi-Karatsu	Chikuhi Line Local	through to Airport Line
Preceding station	Fukuoka City Subway	Following station
through to Chikuhi Line	Airport Line	Muromi K02 towards Fukuoka Airport
Location
- Location within Fukuoka Prefecture Location within Japan

Meinohama Station (姪浜駅, Meinohama-eki) is a junction passenger railway station located in Nishi-ku, Fukuoka, Fukuoka Prefecture, Japan. It is jointly operated by JR Kyushu and the Fukuoka City Transportation Bureau. The station symbol of the subway station is a yacht in yellow, symbolizing nearby Odo yacht harbor (ja).

== Lines ==
The station is the nominal eastern terminus of the Chikuhi Line and is located 44.8 km from the opposing terminus of the line at Nishi-Karatsu; however, most trains continue past Meinohama for another 11.6 km (7.2 mi) to terminate at Hakata. Local and weekday rapid services on the Chikuhi Line stop at this station. The station is also the terminus of the 13.1 kilometer Airport Line on the Fukuoka City Subway.

== Station layout ==
This is an elevated station with two island platforms serving four tracks, with the station building underneath. The inner tracks are used by the Fukuoka City Subway and the outer tracks by JR Kyushu, permitting ease of interchange. The station is staffed.

=== Platforms ===
1	■ Airport Line	for Nishijin, Tenjin, Hakata and Fukuoka Airport (through from Chikuhi Line)
2	■ Airport Line	for Nishijin, Tenjin, Hakata and Fukuoka Airport
2	■ Hakozaki Line	for Kaizuka
3	■ Airport Line	for Nishijin, Tenjin, Hakata and Fukuoka Airport
3	■ Hakozaki Line	for Kaizuka
4	■ JK Chikuhi Line	for Chikuzen-Maebaru, Chikuzen-Fukae, Karatsu and Nishi-Karatsu

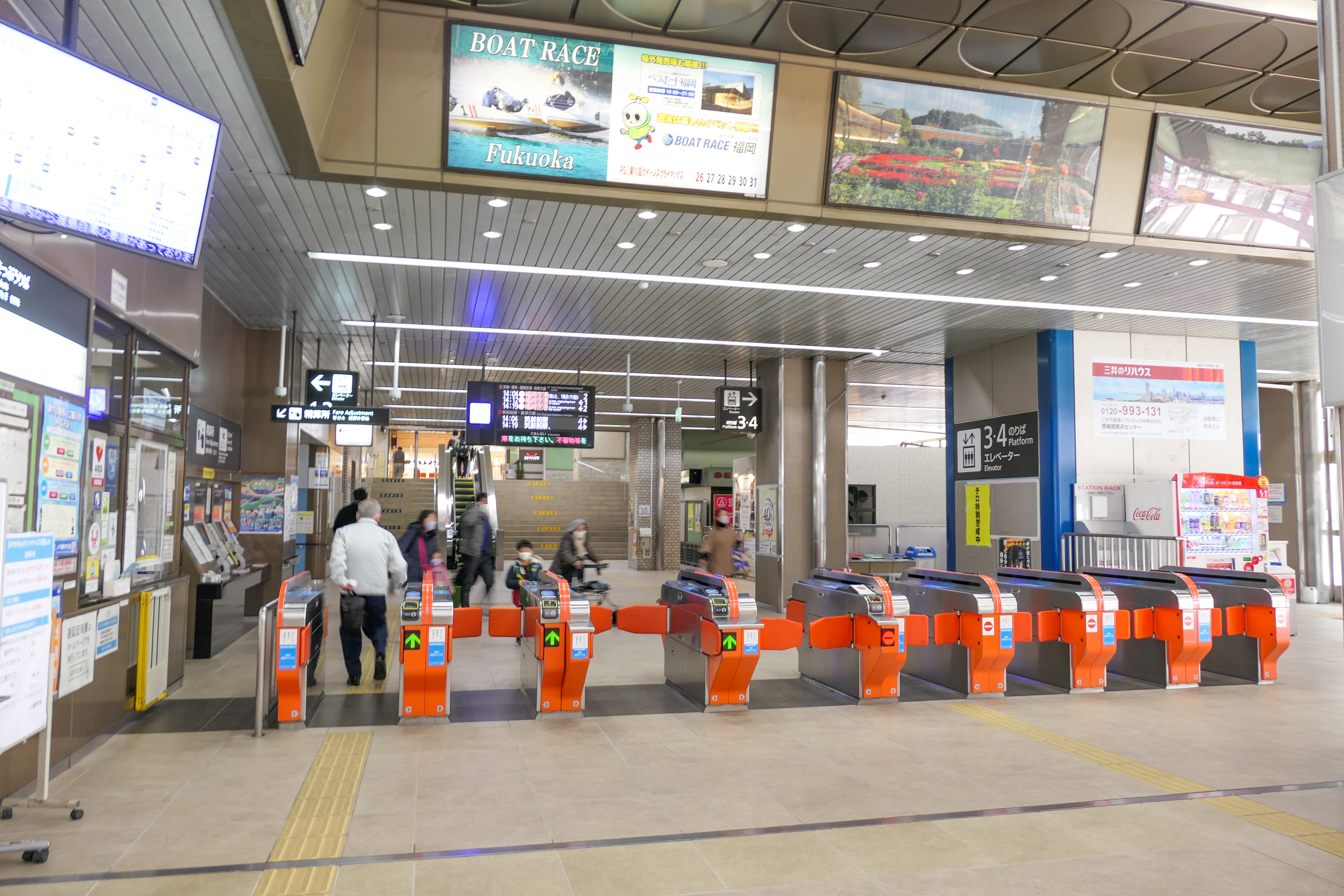
Ticket gates

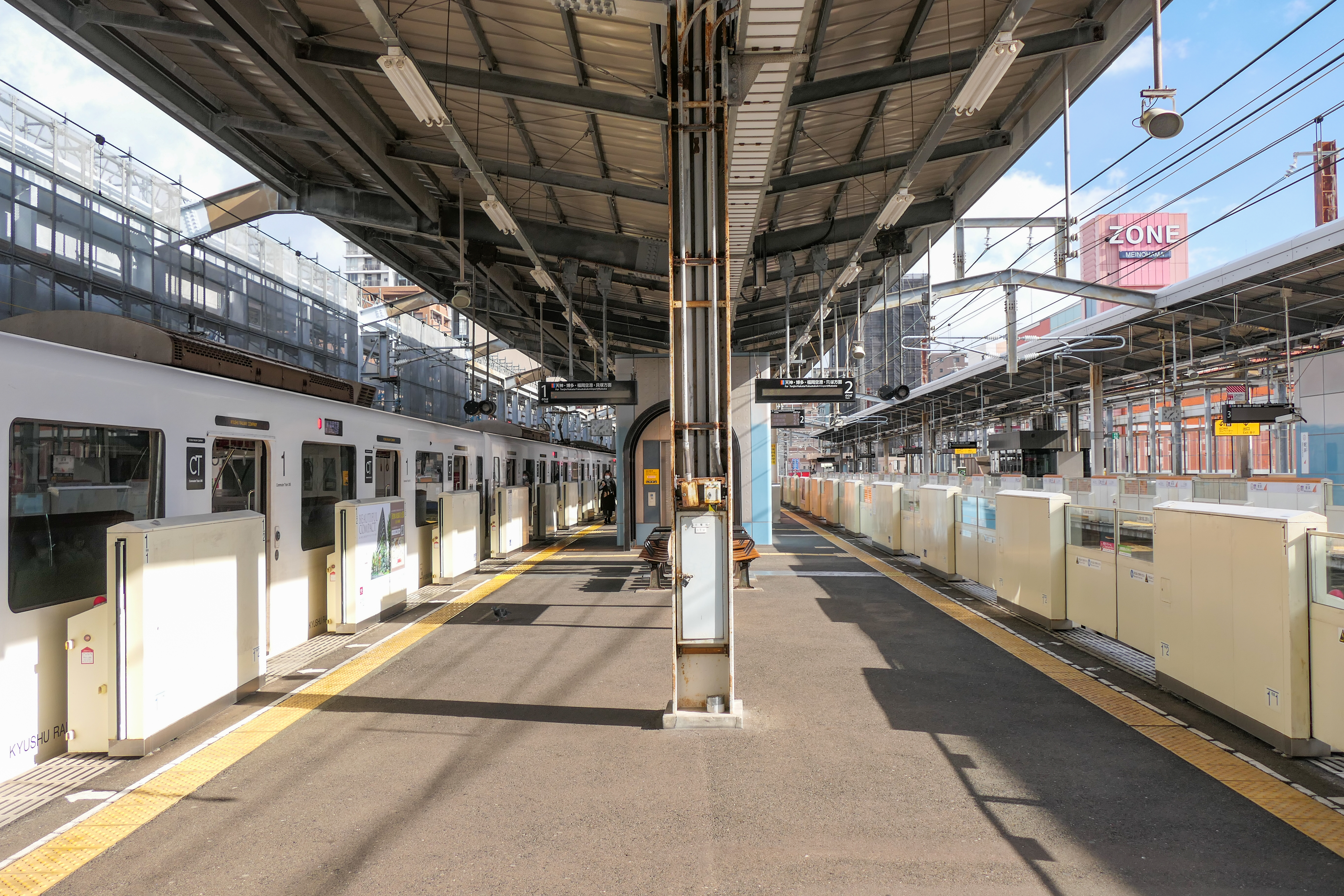
Platforms 1 and 2

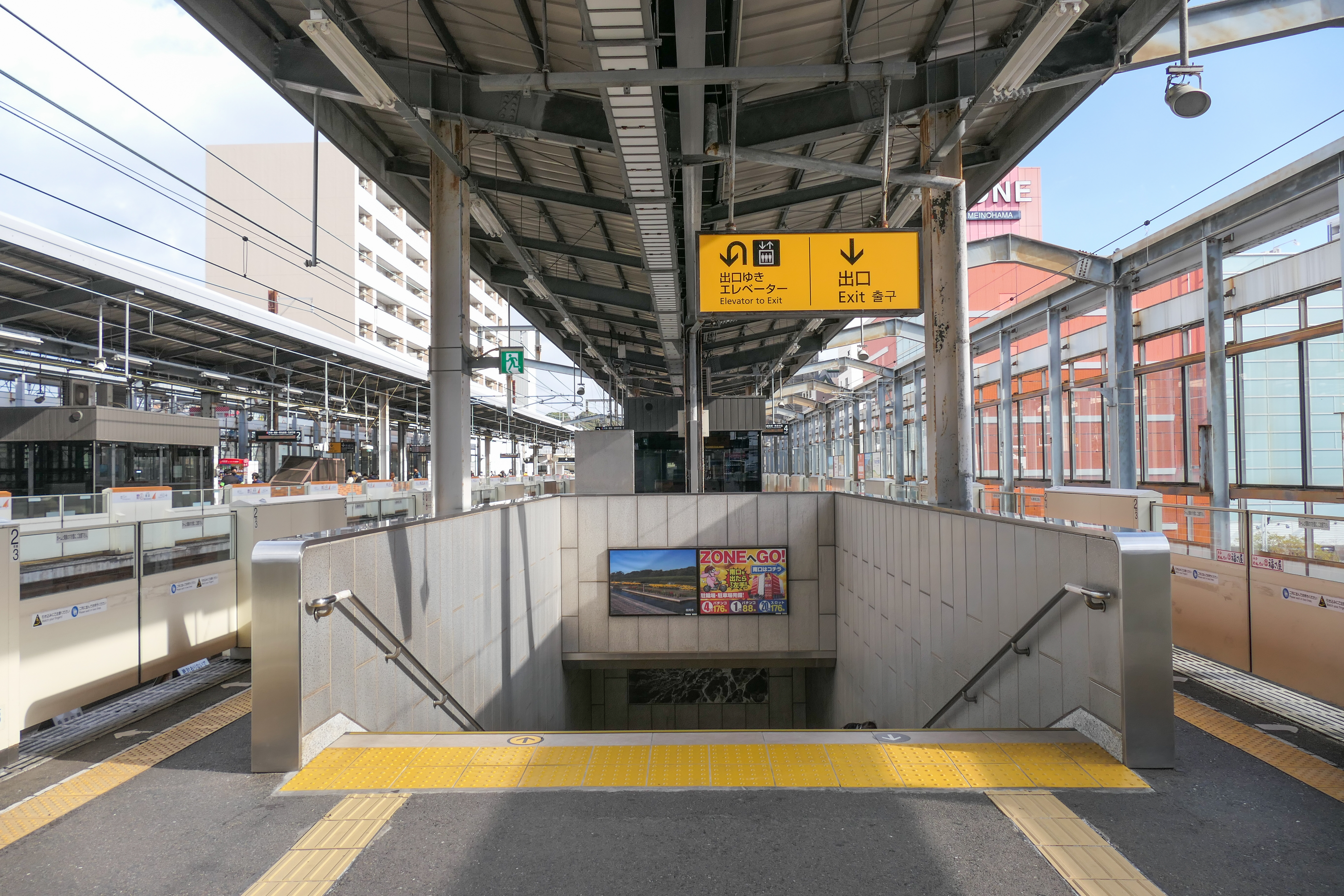
Platforms 3 and 4

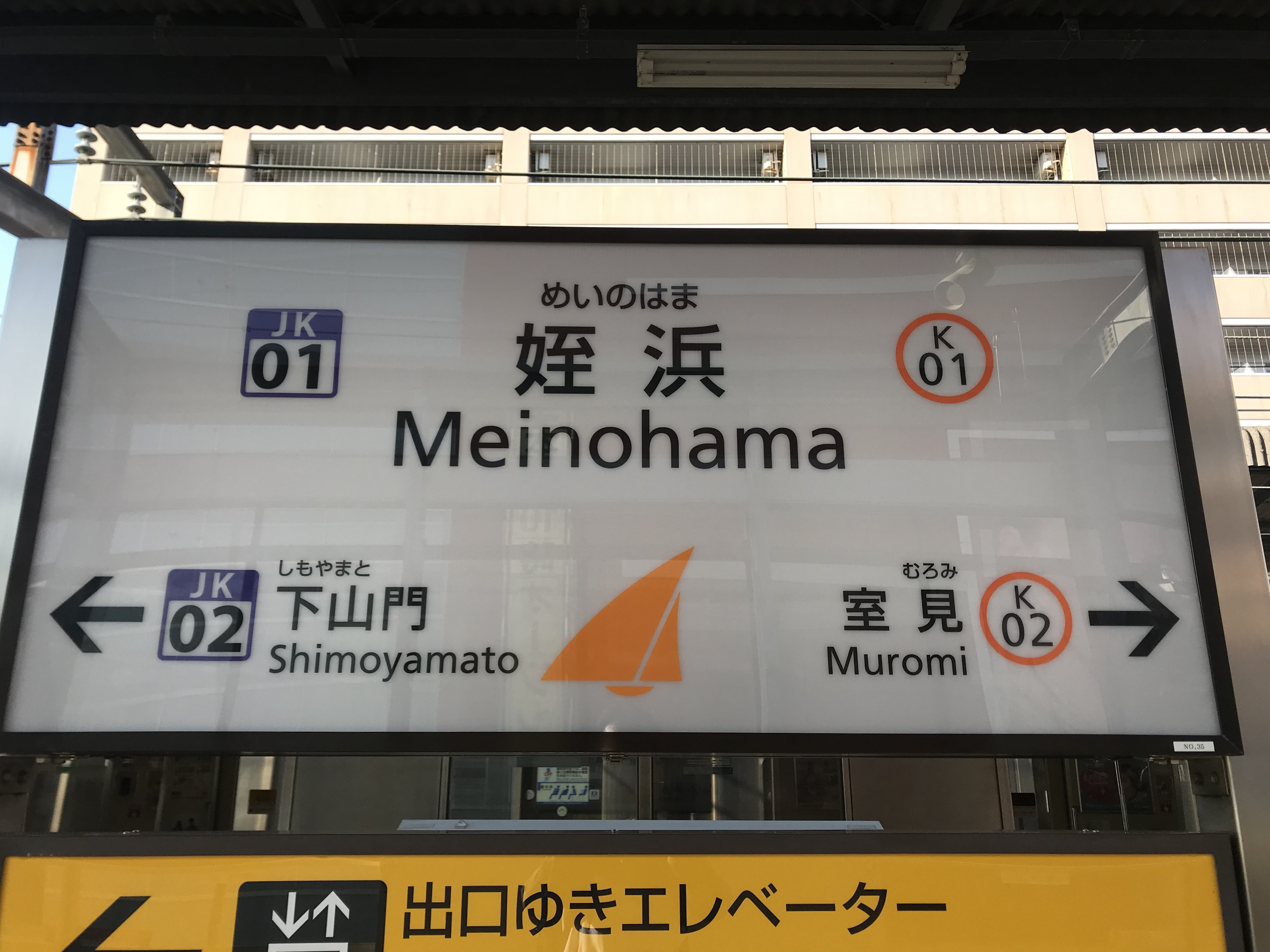
Station sign
- Some trains leaving from track 2 and 3 stop at all stations to Nakasu-Kawabata and continue on Hakozaki Line.
- Track 2 and 3 are connected to Fukuoka City Subway Meinohama rolling stock maintenance depot near Shimoyamato Station

== History ==
The private Kitakyushu Railway had opened a track between Fukuyoshi and Hamasaki on 5 December 1923. By 1 April 1924, the line had been extended eastwards to Chikuzen-Maebaru. In the third phase of expansion, the line was extended further east with Meinohama opening as the new eastern terminus on 15 April 1925. When the Kitakyushu Railway was nationalized on 1 October 1937, Japanese Government Railways (JGR) took over control of the station and designated the line which served it as the Chikuhi Line. On 22 March 1983, electrification of the track between Meinohama Station and Karatsu Station was completed and the track from Meinohama Station to Hakata Station was discontinued. The Fukuoka City Subway Line 1 (now the Airport Line) opens accompanied by a mutual operating agreement between it and the Chikuhi Line. With the privatization of Japanese National Railways (JNR), the successor of JGR, on 1 April 1987, control of the station passed to JR Kyushu.

== Passenger statistics ==
In fiscal 2020, the station was used by an average of 4690 passengers daily (boarding passengers only), and it ranked 31st among the busiest stations of JR Kyushu. During the same period, the Fukuoka City Subway portion of the station recorded 36,269 passengers daily

== Surrounding area ==
The station is located a residential area lined with high-rise apartments. There is a bus terminal in front of the station, where many buses arrive and depart.

- Nishi Ward Office
- Fukuoka City Yacht Harbor

== See also ==
- List of railway stations in Japan
