= Sari Station (Karatsu) =

Railway station in Karatsu, Saga Prefecture, Japan

Sari Station 佐里駅
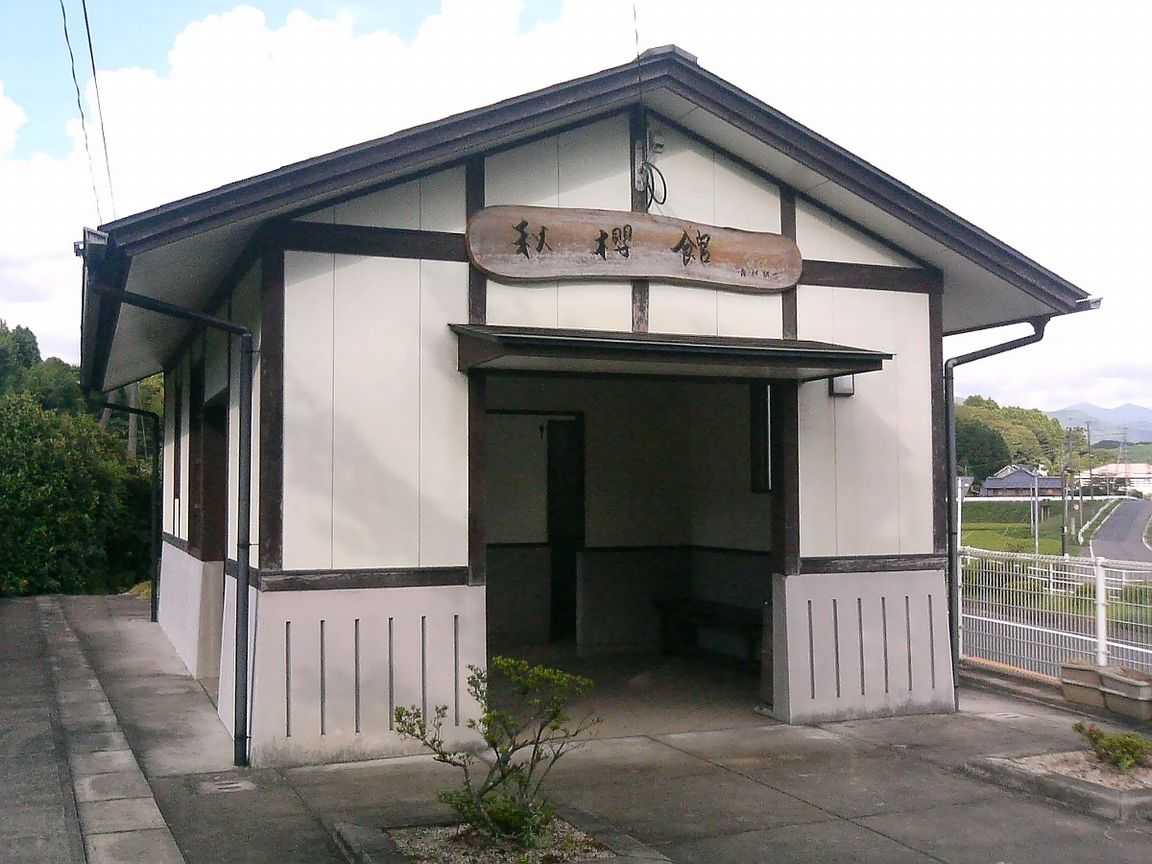
- Waiting room at Sari Station in 2007

General information
- Location: Ochicho Sari, Karatsu-shi, Saga-ken 849-3233; Japan
- Coordinates: 33°20′16″N 129°58′43″E
- Operator: JR Kyushu
- Line: ■ Chikuhi Line
- Distance: 8.2 km from Yamamoto
- Platforms: 1 side platform
- Tracks: 1

Construction
- Structure type: Low embankment
- Cycle facilities: Bike shed

Other information
- Status: Unstaffed
- Website: Official website

History
- Opened: 1 March 1935
- Closed: 10 August 1941, reopened 1 June 1946
- Former names: Sari Onsen (until 1936); Matsuura Onsen (until 1 October 1937)

Passengers
- FY2015: 9 daily
Location
- Location within Saga Prefecture Location within Japan

Sari Station (佐里駅, Sari-eki) is a passenger railway station on the Chikuhi Line of Kyushu Railway Company (JR Kyushu), located in the city of Karatsu, Saga Prefecture, Japan.

== Lines ==
The station is served by the western section of the Chikuhi Line and is 8.2 km from the starting point of this section at Yamamoto.

== Station layout ==
The station, which is unstaffed, consists of a side platform serving a single track on a low embankment. There is no station building but a shelter is provided on the platform. In addition, the municipal authorities have set up a waiting room named "Aki Sakura-kan" (meaning Autumn Cherry Blossom Room) near the station entrance. This is a simple wooden structure of Japanese design, similar to one that was built two stops up the line at Hizen-Kubo. A bike shed is provided nearby.

== Adjacent stations ==
←	Service	→
Chikuhi Line (western section)
Nishi-Ōchi	Local	Komanaki

== History ==
The private Kitakyushu Railway, which had a track between Hakata and Higashi-Karatsu by 1926 and had expanded southwards to Yamamoto by 1929. In a later phase of expansion, the track was extended west from Yamamoto to Imari, which opened as the western terminus on 1 March 1935. This station was opened on the same day as an intermediate station on the new track under the name Sari Onsen (佐里温泉). In 1936, the station name was changed to Matsuura Onsen (松浦温泉). The Kitakyushi Railway was nationalised on 1 October 1937 and Japanese Government Railways (JGR) assumed control of the station, changed the name again to Sari and designated the track which served it as part of the Chikuhi Line. The station was closed on 10 August 1941 and reopened on 1 June 1946. With the privatization of Japanese National Railways (JNR), the successor of JGR, on 1 April 1987, control of the station passed to JR Kyushu.

== Passenger statistics ==
In fiscal 2015, there were a total of 3,342 boarding passengers, giving a daily average of 9 passengers.

== Surrounding area ==
- Karatsu City Sari Elementary School

== See also ==
- List of railway stations in Japan
