= Nishi-Ōchi Station =

Railway station in Karatsu, Saga Prefecture, Japan

Nishi-Ōchi Station 西相知駅
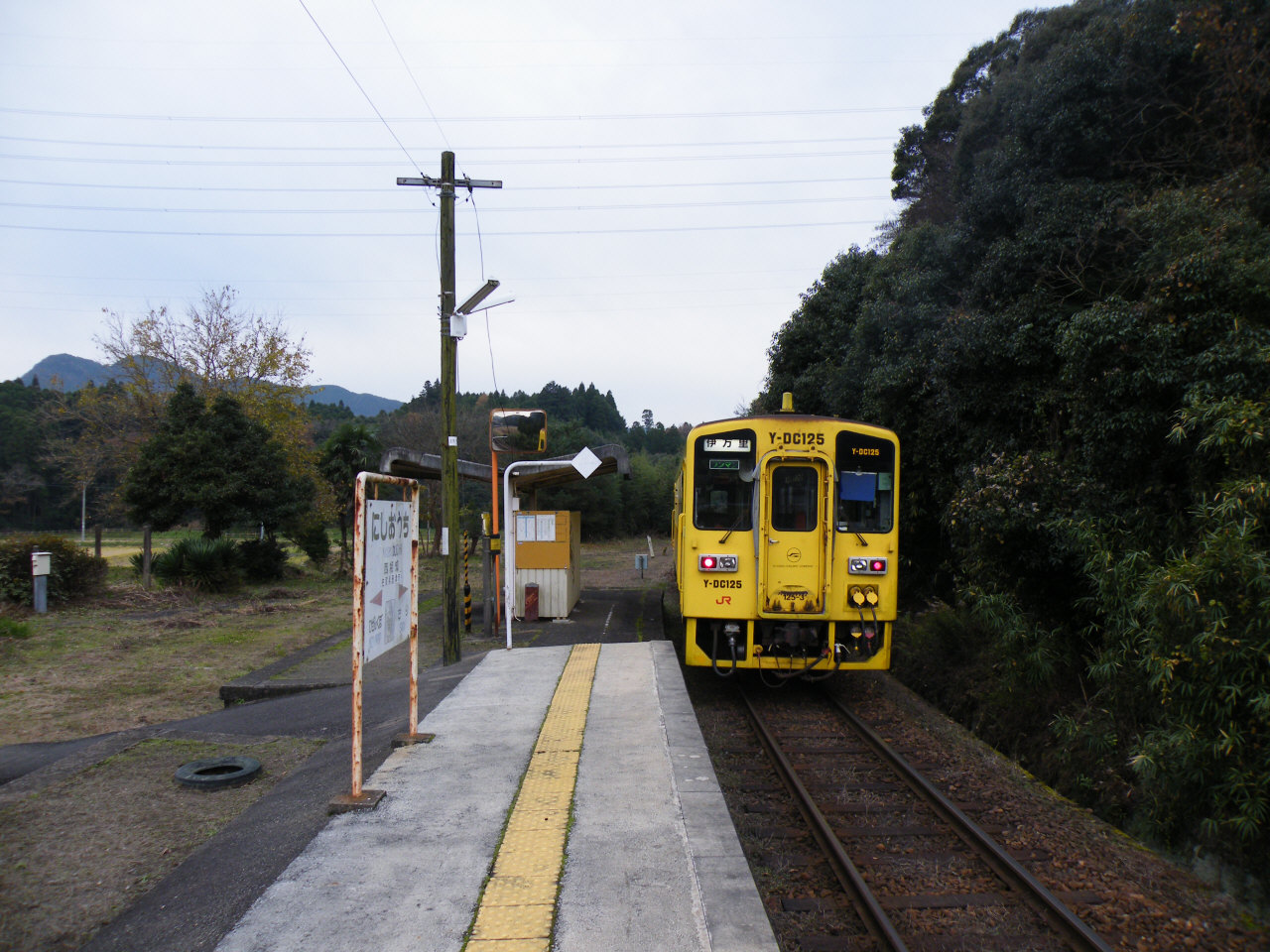
- Platform of Nishi-Ōchi Station in 2008

General information
- Location: Ochicho Sari, Karatsu-shi, Saga-ken 849-3233; Japan
- Coordinates: 33°20′51″N 129°59′26″E
- Operator: JR Kyushu
- Line: ■ Chikuhi Line
- Distance: 6.6 km from Yamamoto
- Platforms: 1 side platform
- Tracks: 1

Construction
- Structure type: At grade
- Cycle facilities: Bike shed

Other information
- Status: Unstaffed
- Website: Official website

History
- Opened: 1 March 1935

Passengers
- FY2015: 9 daily
Location
- Location within Saga Prefecture Location within Japan

Nishi-Ōchi Station (西相知駅, Nishi-Ōchi-eki) is a passenger railway station on the Chikuhi Line of Kyushu Railway Company (JR Kyushu), located in the city of Karatsu, Saga Prefecture, Japan.

== Lines ==
The station is served by the western section of the Chikuhi Line and is 6.6 km from the starting point of this section at Yamamoto.

== Station layout ==
The station, which is unstaffed, consists of a side platform serving a single track at grade. There is no station building but a shelter has been set up on the platform. A bike shed is provided nearby.

== Adjacent stations ==
←	Service	→
Chikuhi Line (western section)
Hizen-Kubo	Local	Sari

== History ==
The private Kitakyushu Railway, which had a track between Hakata and Higashi-Karatsu by 1926 and had expanded southwards to Yamamoto by 1929. In a later phase of expansion, the track was extended west from Yamamoto to Imari, which opened as the western terminus on 1 March 1935. Nishi-Ōchi was opened on the same day as an intermediate station on the new track. The Kitakyushi Railway was nationalised on 1 October 1937. Japanese Government Railways (JGR) assumed control of the station and designated the track which served it as part of the Chikuhi Line. With the privatization of Japanese National Railways (JNR), the successor of JGR, on 1 April 1987, control of the station passed to JR Kyushu.

== Passenger statistics ==
In fiscal 2015, there were a total of 3,431 boarding passengers, giving a daily average of 9 passengers.

== See also ==
- List of railway stations in Japan
