= Komanaki Station =

Railway station in Imari, Saga Prefecture, Japan

Komanaki Station 駒鳴駅
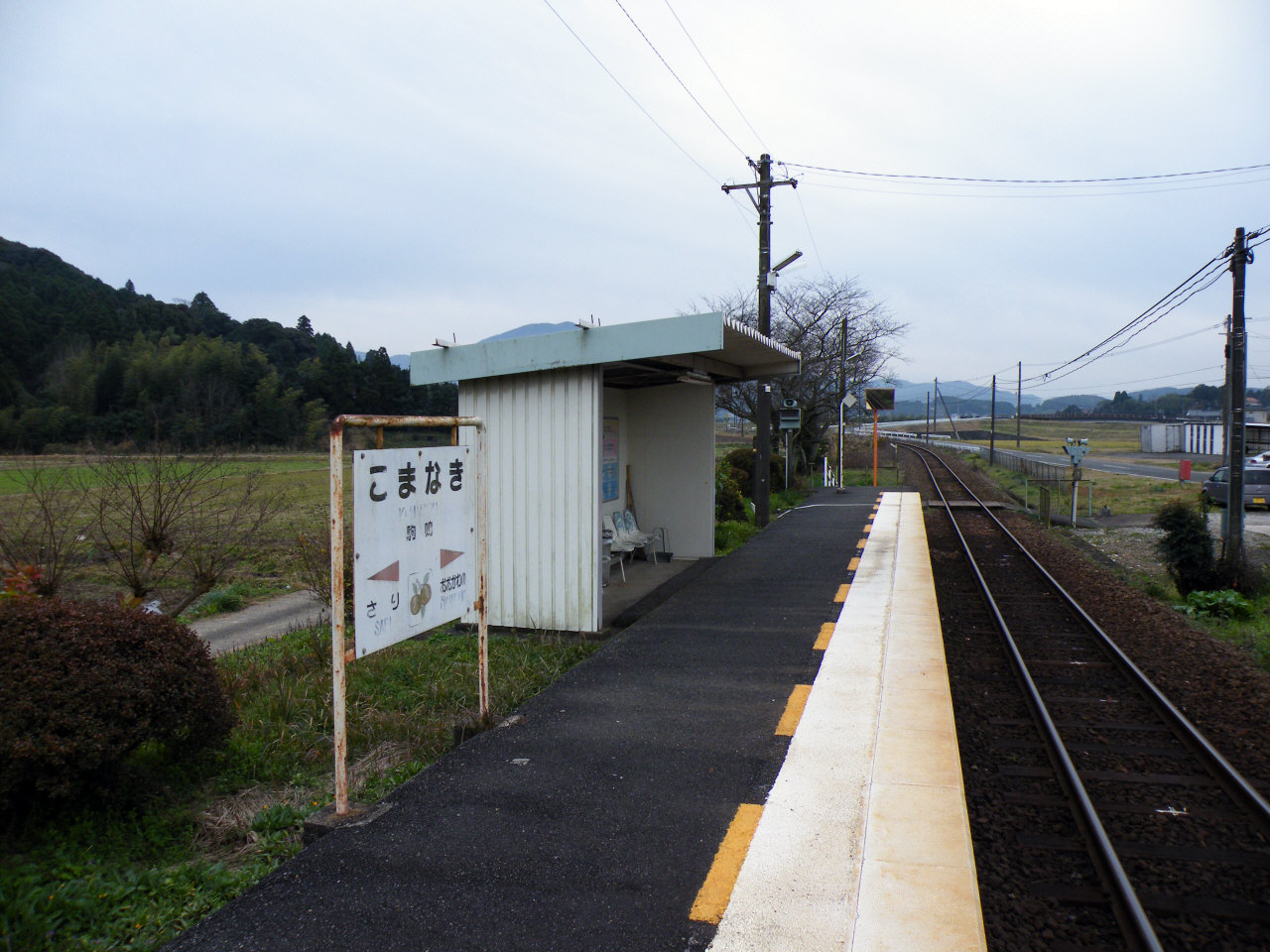
- Komanaki Station in 2008

General information
- Location: Komanaki Okawacho, Imari-shi, Saga-ken 849-5253; Japan
- Coordinates: 33°19′10″N 129°58′20″E
- Operator: JR Kyushu
- Line: ■ Chikuhi Line
- Distance: 11.0 km from Yamamoto
- Platforms: 1 side
- Tracks: 1

Construction
- Structure type: At grade
- Cycle facilities: Bike shed

Other information
- Status: Unstaffed
- Website: Official website

History
- Opened: 1 March 1935

Passengers
- FY2015: 7 daily
Location
- Location within Saga Prefecture Location within Japan

Komanaki Station (駒鳴駅, Komanaki-eki) is a passenger railway station operated by JR Kyushu, located in the city of Imari, Saga Prefecture, Japan.

== Lines ==
The station is served by the western section of the Chikuhi Line and is 11.0 km from the starting point of this section at Yamamoto.

== Station layout ==
The station, which is unstaffed, consists of a side platform serving a single track at grade. The platform is located on the opposite side of the track from the access road and is reached by means of a level crossing. There is no station building but a shelter is provided on the platform. A bike shed is provided near the station entrance.

== Adjacent stations ==
←	Service	→
Chikuhi Line (western section)
Sari	Local	Ōkawano

== History ==
The private Kitakyushu Railway, which had a track between Hakata and Higashi-Karatsu by 1926 and had expanded southwards to Yamamoto by 1929. In a later phase of expansion, the track was extended west from Yamamoto to Imari, which opened as the western terminus on 1 March 1935. This station was opened on the same day as an intermediate station on the new track. The Kitakyushi Railway was nationalised on 1 October 1937 and Japanese Government Railways (JGR) assumed control of the station and designated the track which served it as part of the Chikuhi Line. With the privatization of Japanese National Railways (JNR), the successor of JGR, on 1 April 1987, control of the station passed to JR Kyushu.

== Passenger statistics ==
In fiscal 2015, there were a total of 2,535 boarding passengers, giving a daily average of 7 passengers.

== See also ==
- List of railway stations in Japan
