= Hizen-Nagano Station =

Railway station in Imari, Saga Prefecture, Japan

Hizen-Nagano Station 肥前長野駅
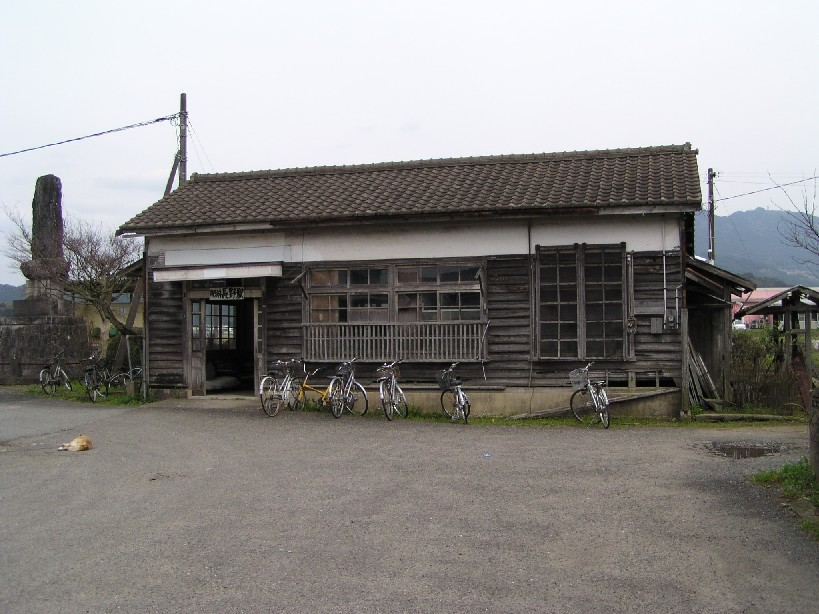
- Hizen-Nagano Station in 2005

General information
- Location: Okawano Okawacho, Imari-shi, Saga-ken 849-5251; Japan
- Coordinates: 33°17′44″N 129°58′15″E
- Operator: JR Kyushu
- Line: ■ Chikuhi Line
- Distance: 14.3 km from Yamamoto
- Platforms: 1 side platform
- Tracks: 1

Construction
- Structure type: At grade

Other information
- Status: Unstaffed
- Website: Official website

History
- Opened: 1 March 1935

Passengers
- FY2015: 19 daily
Location
- Location within Saga Prefecture Location within Japan

Hizen-Nagano Station (肥前長野駅, Hizen-Nagano-eki) is a passenger railway station located in the city of Imari, Saga Prefecture, Japan. It is operated by JR Kyushu.

== Lines ==
The station is served by the western section of the Chikuhi Line and is 14.3 km from the starting point of this section at Yamamoto.

== Station layout ==
The station, which is unstaffed, consists of a side platform serving a single track. The station building is an old timber structure of traditional Japanese design which serves only as a waiting room.

== Adjacent stations ==
←	Service	→
Chikuhi Line (western section)
Ōkawano	Local	Momonokawa

== History ==
The private Kitakyushu Railway, which had a track between Hakata and Higashi-Karatsu by 1926 and had expanded southwards to Yamamoto by 1929. In a later phase of expansion, the track was extended west from Yamamoto to Imari, which opened as the western terminus on 1 March 1935. This station was opened on the same day as an intermediate station on the new track. The Kitakyushu Railway was nationalised on 1 October 1937 and Japanese Government Railways (JGR) assumed control of the station and designated the track which served it as part of the Chikuhi Line. With the privatization of Japanese National Railways (JNR), the successor of JGR, on 1 April 1987, control of the station passed to JR Kyushu.

== Passenger statistics ==
In fiscal 2015, there were a total of 7,092 boarding passengers, giving a daily average of 19 passengers.

== Surrounding area ==
- Imari City Tōryō Junior High School
