= Kanaishihara Station =

Railway station in Imari, Saga Prefecture, Japan

Kanaishihara Station 金石原駅
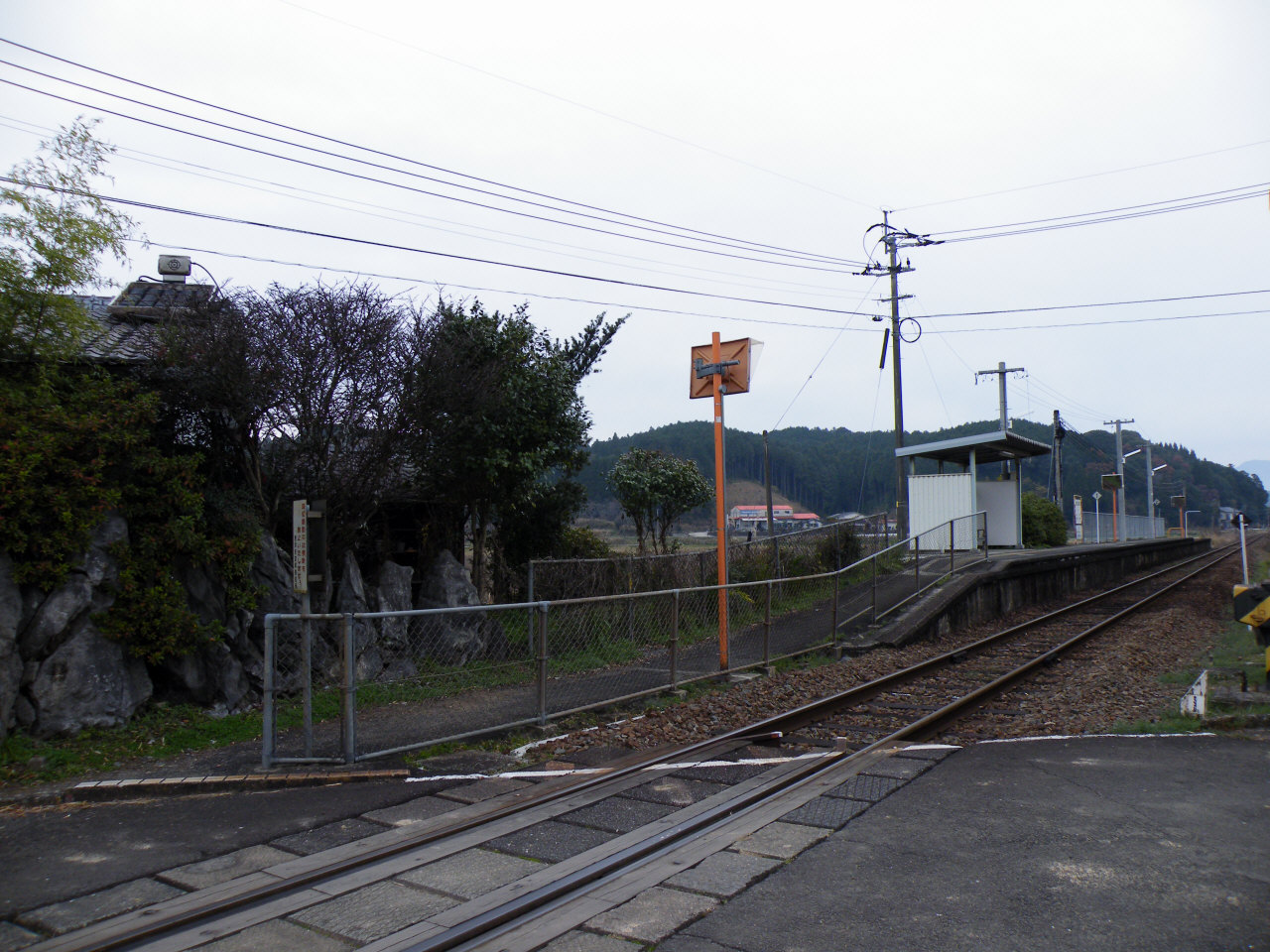
- Kanaishihara Station in 2008

General information
- Location: Yamagata Matsuuracho, Imari-shi, Saga-ken 849-5263; Japan
- Coordinates: 33°15′54″N 129°56′04″E
- Operator: JR Kyushu
- Line: ■ Chikuhi Line
- Distance: 19.7 km from Yamamoto
- Platforms: 1 side platform
- Tracks: 1

Construction
- Structure type: At grade

Other information
- Status: Unstaffed
- Website: Official website

History
- Opened: 1 March 1935

Passengers
- FY2015: 14 daily
Location
- Location within Saga Prefecture Location within Japan

Kanaishihara Station (金石原駅, Kanaishihara-eki) is a passenger railway station located in the city of Imari, Saga Prefecture, Japan. It is operated by JR Kyushu.

== Lines ==
The station is served by the western section of the Chikuhi Line and is 19.7 km from the starting point of this section at Yamamoto.

== Station layout ==
The station, which is unstaffed, consists of a side platform serving a single track. There is no station building, only a shelter on the platform for waiting passengers.

== Adjacent stations ==
←	Service	→
Chikuhi Line (western section)
Momonokawa	Local	Kami-Imari

== History ==
The private Kitakyushu Railway, which had a track between Hakata and Higashi-Karatsu by 1926 and had expanded southwards to Yamamoto by 1929. In a later phase of expansion, the track was extended west from Yamamoto to Imari, which opened as the western terminus on 1 March 1935. This station was opened on the same day as an intermediate station on the new track. The Kitakyushu Railway was nationalised on 1 October 1937 and Japanese Government Railways (JGR) assumed control of the station and designated the track which served it as part of the Chikuhi Line. With the privatization of Japanese National Railways (JNR), the successor of JGR, on 1 April 1987, control of the station passed to JR Kyushu.

== Passenger statistics ==
In fiscal 2015, there were a total of 4,941 boarding passengers, giving a daily average of 14 passengers.

== Surrounding area ==
- Japan National Route 498
