= Ōkawano Station =

Railway station in Imari, Saga Prefecture, Japan

Ōkawano Station 大川野駅
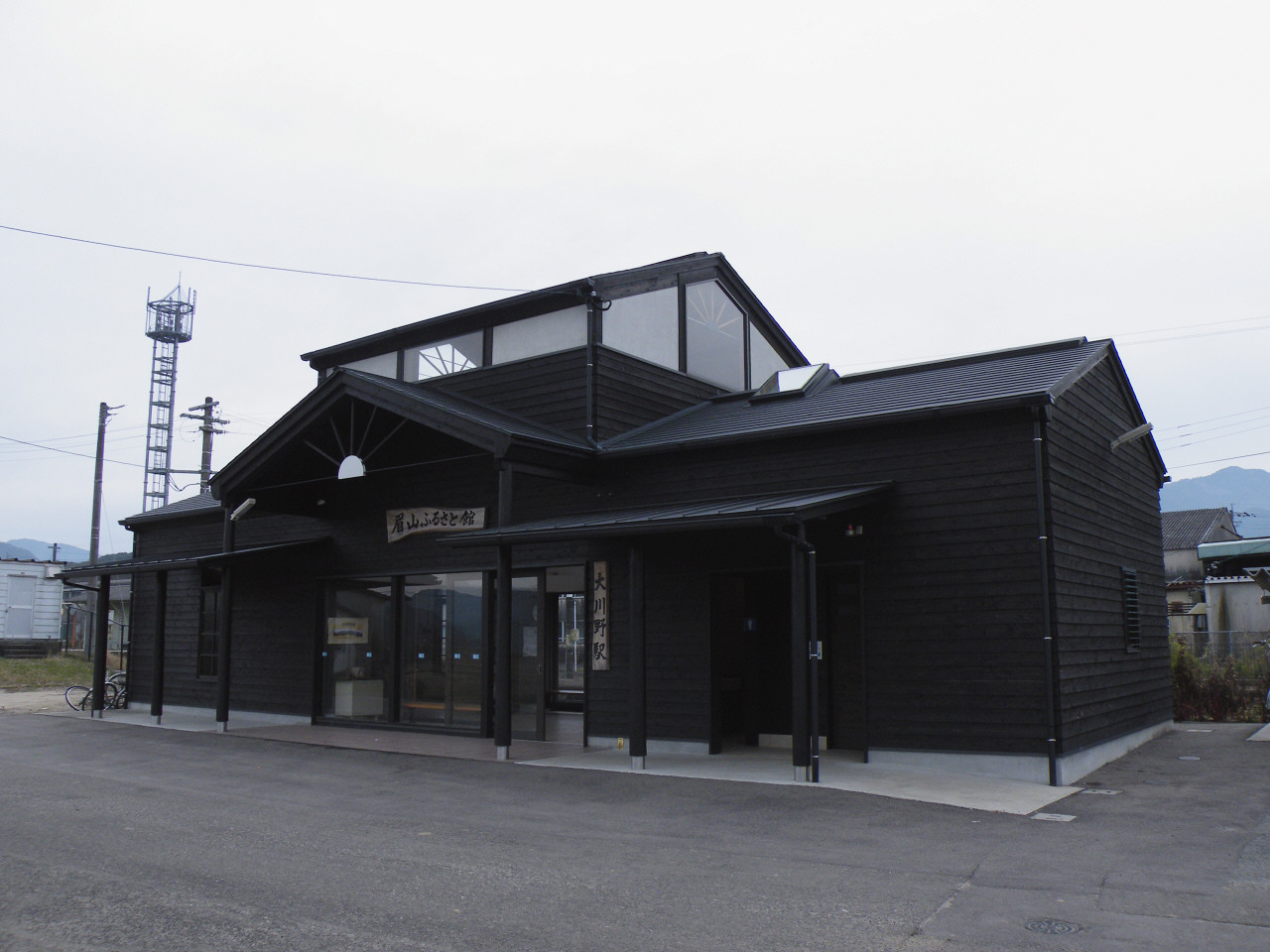
- Ōkawano Station in 2008

General information
- Location: Ōkawa-machi Ōkawano, Imari-shi, Saga-ken 849-5251; Japan
- Coordinates: 33°18′27″N 129°58′37″E
- Operator: JR Kyushu
- Line: ■ Chikuhi Line
- Distance: 12.9 km from Yamamoto
- Platforms: 1 island platform
- Tracks: 2 + 2 sidings

Construction
- Structure type: At grade
- Parking: Available
- Cycle facilities: Bike shed

Other information
- Status: Unstaffed
- Website: Official website

History
- Opened: 1 March 1935

Passengers
- FY2015: 41 daily
Location
- Location within Saga Prefecture Location within Japan

Ōkawano Station (大川野駅, Ōkawano-eki) is a passenger railway station located in the city of Imari, Saga Prefecture, Japan. It is operated by JR Kyushu.

== Lines ==
The station is served by the western section of the Chikuhi Line and is 12.9 km from the starting point of this section at Yamamoto. Besides the terminal at Yamamoto, the station is the only place on this section of line with a passing loop which allows trains travelling in opposite directions to pass each other.

== Station layout ==
The station, which is unstaffed, consists of an island platform serving two tracks at grade. The station building, built in 2006, is a timber structure in traditional Japanese style with a skylight. It serves as a waiting room as well as a local community facility. Access to the island platform is by means of a level crossing.

== Adjacent stations ==
←	Service	→
Chikuhi Line (western section)
Komanaki	Local	Hizen-Nagano

== History ==
The private Kitakyushu Railway, which had a track between Hakata and Higashi-Karatsu by 1926 and had expanded southwards to Yamamoto by 1929. In a later phase of expansion, the track was extended west from Yamamoto to Imari, which opened as the western terminus on 1 March 1935. This station was opened on the same day as an intermediate station on the new track. The Kitakyushi Railway was nationalised on 1 October 1937 and Japanese Government Railways (JGR) assumed control of the station and designated the track which served it as part of the Chikuhi Line. With the privatization of Japanese National Railways (JNR), the successor of JGR, on 1 April 1987, control of the station passed to JR Kyushu.

In 2006, Ōkawa town authorities, in response to requests by residents, opened the Bizan Community Hall (眉山ふるさと館, Bizan-furusato-kan) to replace the station building which had been demolished in 2001. The new building serves as a waiting room for the station and also doubles as a community facility, featuring rooms which can be rented for meetings, and an exhibition space with displays about the history and the economy of the region.

== Passenger statistics ==
In fiscal 2015, there were a total of 14,883 boarding passengers, giving a daily average of 41 passengers.

== Surrounding area ==
- Okawa Community Center (Imari City Hall Okawa Branch)
- Imari City Okawa Elementary School
