= Kami-Imari Station =

Railway station in Imari, Saga Prefecture, Japan

Kami-Imari Station 上伊万里駅
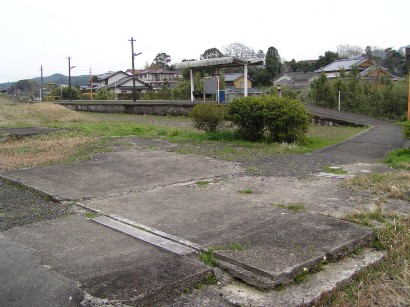
- Kami-Imari Station in 2005

General information
- Location: Hei Otsubocho, Imari-shi, Saga-ken 848-0023; Japan
- Coordinates: 33°16′13″N 129°53′32″E
- Operator: JR Kyushu
- Line: ■ Chikuhi Line
- Distance: 24.1 km from Yamamoto
- Platforms: 1 side platform
- Tracks: 1

Construction
- Structure type: At grade

Other information
- Status: Unstaffed
- Website: Official website

History
- Opened: 1 March 1935

Passengers
- FY2015: 5 daily
Location
- Location within Saga Prefecture Location within Japan

Kami-Imari Station (上伊万里駅, Kami-Imari-eki) is a passenger railway station located in the city of Imari, Saga Prefecture, Japan. It is operated by JR Kyushu.

== Lines ==
The station is served by the western section of the Chikuhi Line and is 24.1 km from the starting point of this section at Yamamoto.

== Station layout ==
The station, which is unstaffed, consists of a side platform serving a single track. There is no station building, only a shelter on the platform for waiting passengers. The traces of a disused freight platform can be seen to the north of the platform.

== Adjacent stations ==
←	Service	→
Chikuhi Line (western section)
Kanaishihara	Local	Imari

== History ==
The private Kitakyushu Railway, which had a track between Hakata and Higashi-Karatsu by 1926 and had expanded southwards to Yamamoto by 1929. In a later phase of expansion, the track was extended west from Yamamoto to Imari, which opened as the western terminus on 1 March 1935. This station was opened on the same day as an intermediate station on the new track. The Kitakyushu Railway was nationalised on 1 October 1937 and Japanese Government Railways (JGR) assumed control of the station and designated the track which served it as part of the Chikuhi Line. With the privatization of Japanese National Railways (JNR), the successor of JGR, on 1 April 1987, control of the station passed to JR Kyushu.

== Passenger statistics ==
In fiscal 2015, there were a total of 1,686 boarding passengers, giving a daily average of 5 passengers.

== Environs ==
- Japan National Route 202
- Japan National Route 498
- Morinaga Park
- Saga Prefectural Imari School for the Handicapped

== See also ==
- List of railway stations in Japan
