= Onizuka Station =

Railway station in Karatsu, Saga Prefecture, Japan

Onizuka Station 鬼塚駅
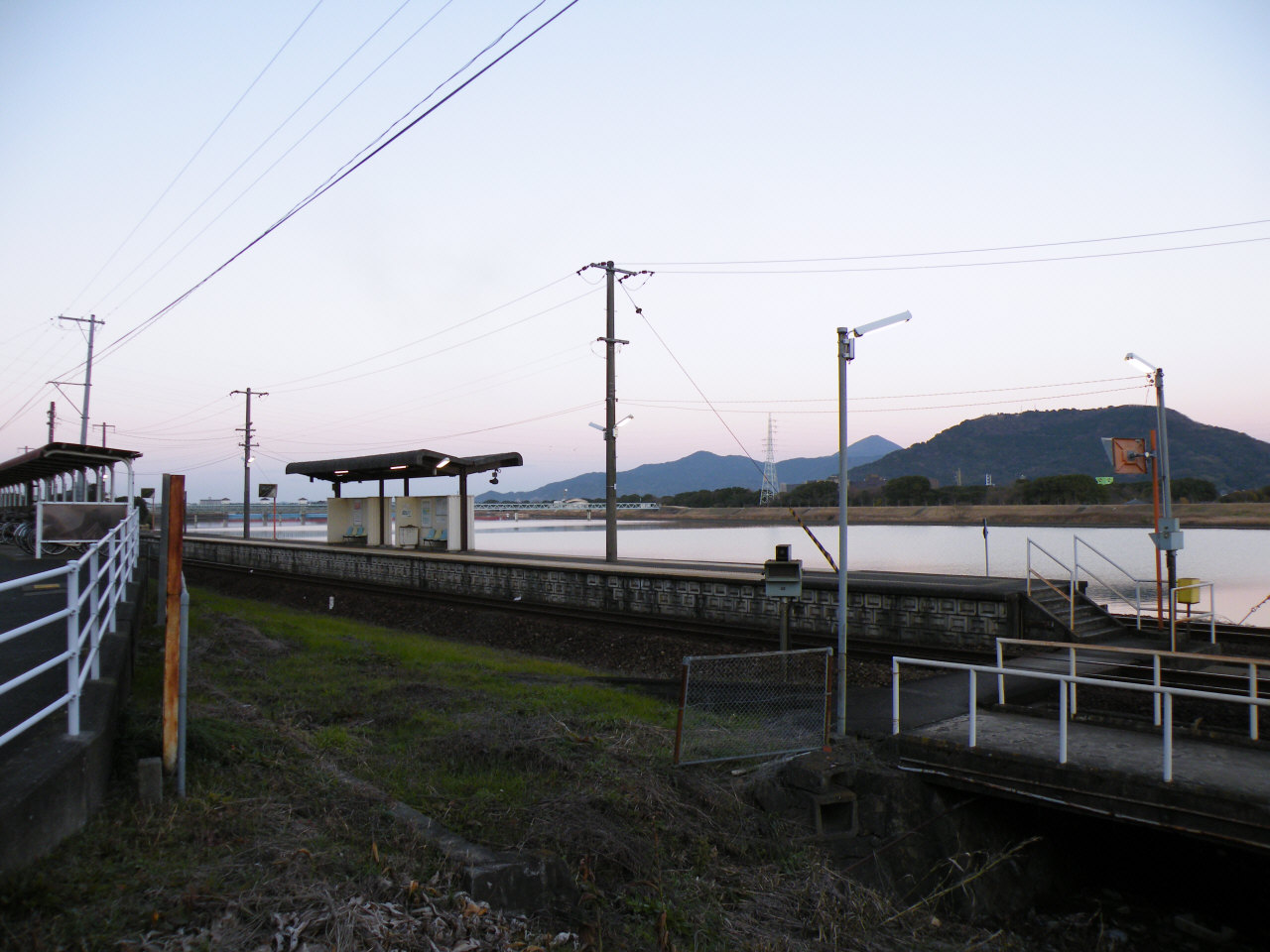
- Onizuka Station in 2009

General information
- Location: 1 Yabutaonizuka, Karatsu-shi, Saga-ken 847-0005; Japan
- Coordinates: 33°25′12″N 129°59′13″E
- Operator: JR Kyushu
- Line: JK Karatsu Line JK Chikuhi Line
- Distance: 36.6 km from Kubota
- Platforms: 1 island platform
- Tracks: 2

Construction
- Structure type: At grade
- Cycle facilities: Bike shed
- Accessible: No - level crossing has steps to platform

Other information
- Status: Unstaffed
- Website: Official website

History
- Opened: 13 June 1899

Passengers
- FY2015: 100 daily

Services
Preceding station	JR Kyushu	Following station
Yamamoto towards Kubota	Karatsu Line	Karatsu towards Nishi-Karatsu
Karatsu towards Nishi-Karatsu	Chikuhi Line	Yamamoto towards Meinohama
Location
- Location within Saga Prefecture Location within Japan

Onizuka Station (鬼塚駅, Onizuka-eki) is a passenger railway station operated by JR Kyushu located in the city of Karatsu, Saga Prefecture, Japan.

== Lines ==
The station is served by the Karatsu Line and is located 36.6 km from the starting point of the line at Kubota. The local services of the Chikuhi Line also use the Karatsu Line tracks in the sector between Karatsu and Yamamoto and also stop at this station.

== Station layout ==
The station, which is unstaffed, consists of an island platform serving two tracks at grade. There is no station building, only a shelter on the platform for waiting passengers. Access to the island platform is by means of a level crossing with steps at the platform end. A bike shed is provided near the station entrance.

=== Platforms ===
west	■ JK Karatsu Line / Chikuhi Line	for Karatsu and Nishi-Karatsu
east	■ JK Karatsu Line / Chikuhi Line	for Saga for Imari

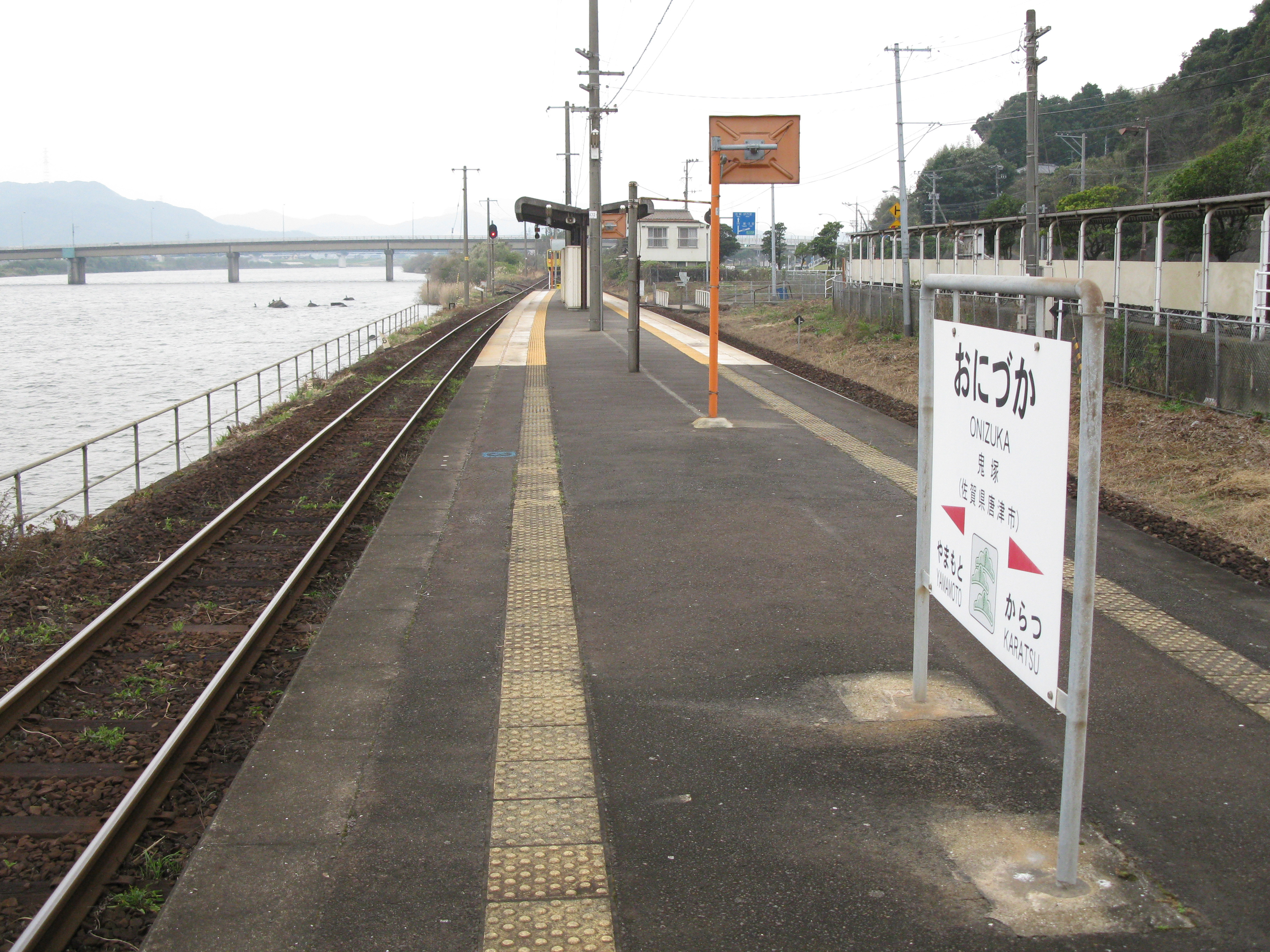
A view of the station platform and tracks.

== History ==
The station was opened by the Karatsu Kogyo Railway on 13 June 1899 as an additional station on a stretch of track which it had laid in 1898 from Miyoken (now Nishi-Karatsu) to Yamamoto. On 23 February 1902, the company, now renamed the Karatsu Railway, merged with the Kyushu Railway. When the Kyushu Railway was nationalized on 1 July 1907, Japanese Government Railways (JGR) took over control of the station. On 12 October 1909, the line which served the station was designated the Karatsu Line. With the privatization of Japanese National Railways (JNR), the successor of JGR, on 1 April 1987, control of the station passed to JR Kyushu.

== Passenger statistics ==
In fiscal 2015, there were a total of 36,601 boarding passengers, giving a daily average of 100 passengers.

== Surrounding area ==
- Japan National Route 202

== See also ==
- List of railway stations in Japan
