= Hizen-Kubo Station =

Railway station in Karatsu, Saga Prefecture, Japan

Hizen-Kubo Station 肥前久保駅
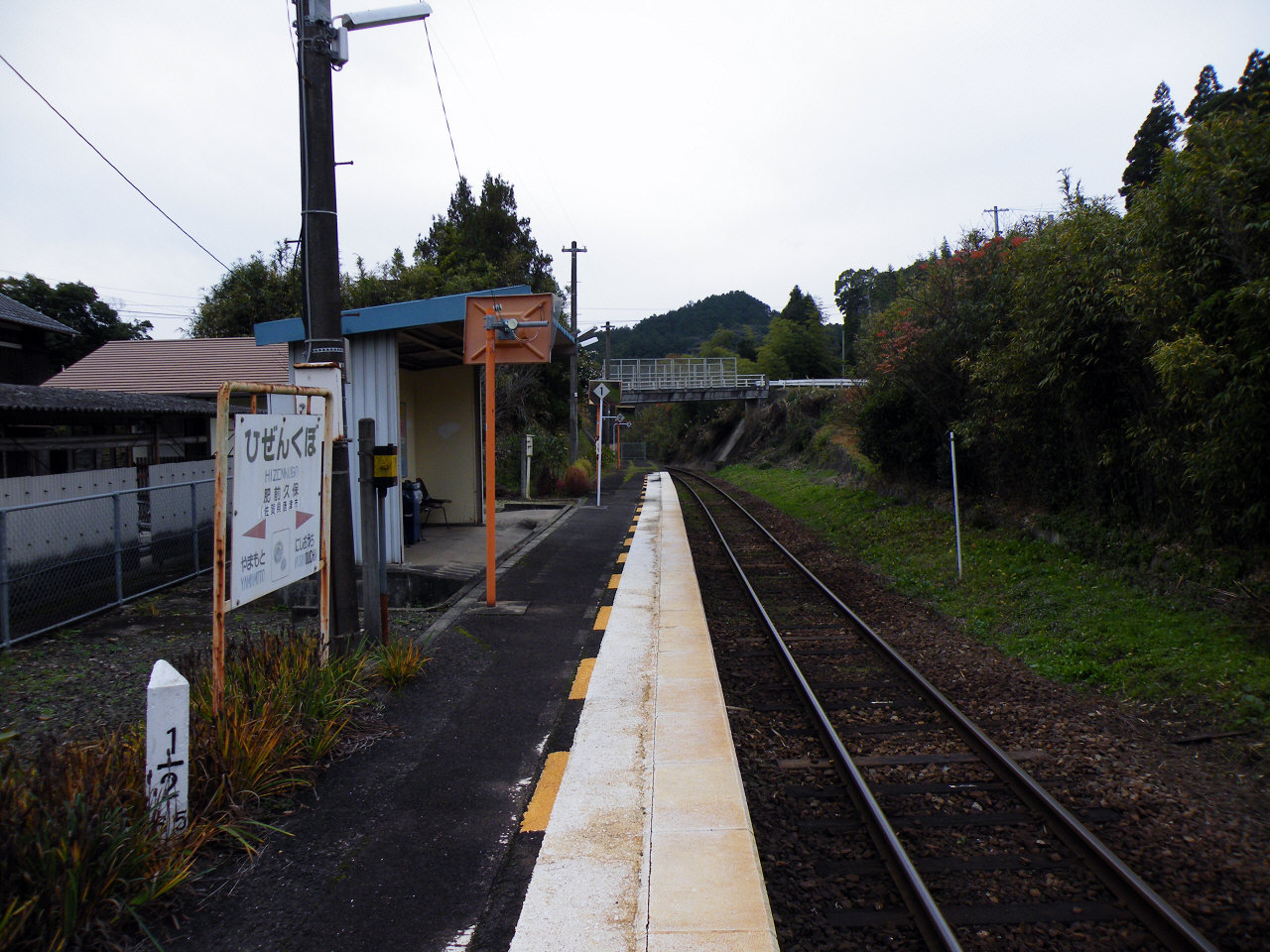
- Platform of Hizen-Kubo Station in 2008

General information
- Location: Ochicho Kubo, Karatsu-shi, Saga-ken 849-3232; Japan
- Coordinates: 33°21′21″N 130°00′02″E
- Operator: JR Kyushu
- Line: ■ Chikuhi Line
- Distance: 5.1 km from Yamamoto
- Platforms: 1 side platform
- Tracks: 1

Construction
- Structure type: At grade
- Cycle facilities: Bike shed

Other information
- Status: Unstaffed
- Website: Official website

History
- Opened: 1 March 1935
- Former names: Banzoīn (until 1 October 1937)

Passengers
- FY2015: 14 daily
Location
- Location within Saga Prefecture Location within Japan

Hizen-Kubo Station (肥前久保駅, Hizen-Kubo-eki) is a passenger railway station on the Chikuhi Line of Kyushu Railway Company (JR Kyushu), located in the city of Karatsu, Saga Prefecture, Japan.

== Lines ==
The station is served by the western section of the Chikuhi Line and is 5.1 km from the starting point of this section at Yamamoto.

== Station layout ==
The station, which is unstaffed, consists of a side platform serving a single track at grade. There is no station building but a shelter is provided on the platform. In addition, a waiting room named "Sakura-kan" (meaning Cherry Blossom Room) has been set up near the station entrance. A bike shed is provided nearby.

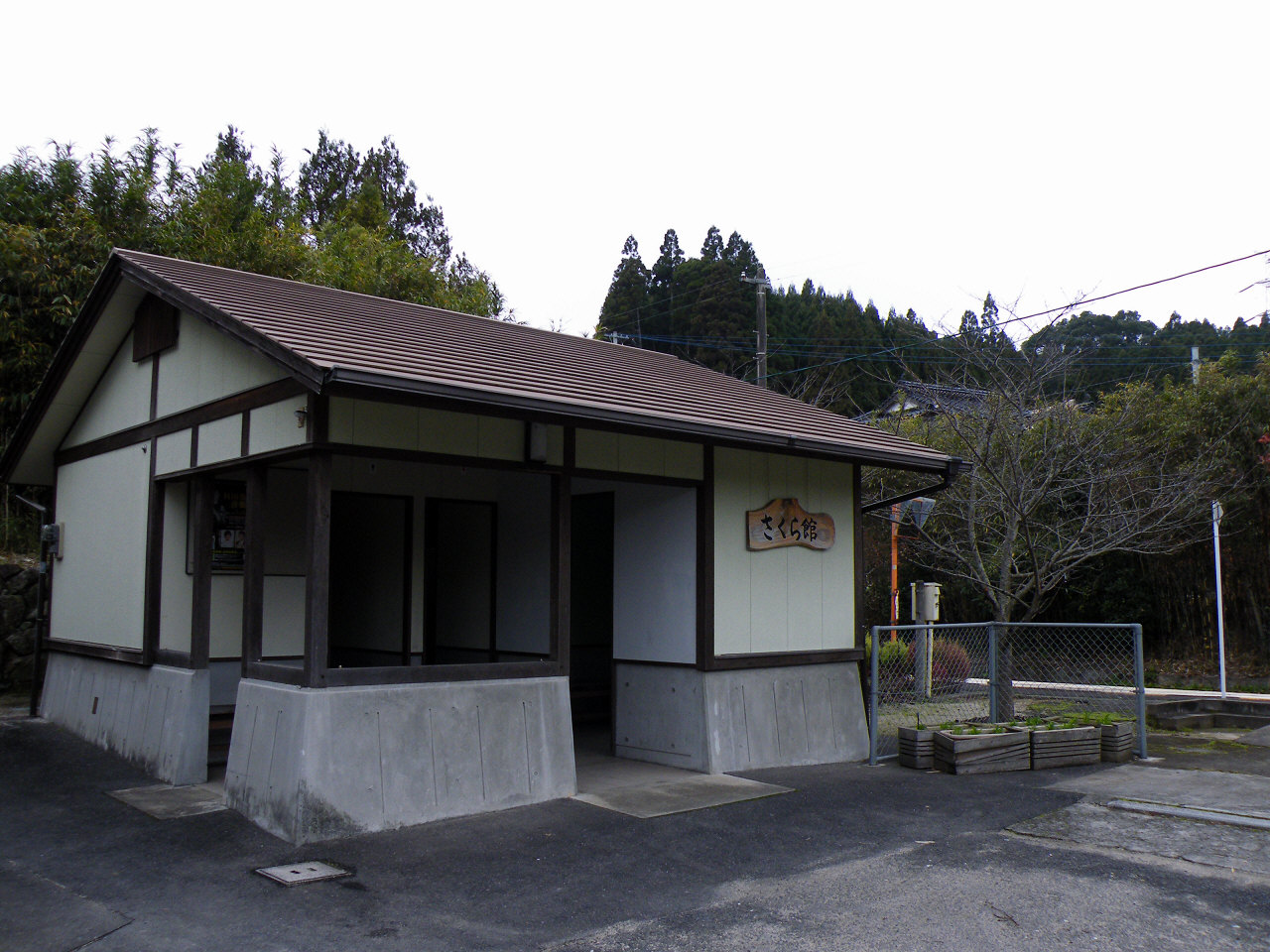
The waiting room "Sakura-kan".

== Adjacent stations ==
←	Service	→
Chikuhi Line (western section)
Yamamoto	Local	Nishi-Ōchi

== History ==
The private Kitakyushu Railway, which had a track between Hakata and Higashi-Karatsu by 1926 and had expanded southwards to Yamamoto by 1929. In a later phase of expansion, the track was extended west from Yamamoto to Imari, which opened as the western terminus on 1 March 1935. This station was opened on the same day as an intermediate station on the new track under the name Banzuīn (幡随院). The Kitakyushi Railway was nationalised on 1 October 1937 and Japanese Government Railways (JGR) assumed control of the station, renamed it Hizen-Kubo and designated the track which served it as part of the Chikuhi Line. With the privatization of Japanese National Railways (JNR), the successor of JGR, on 1 April 1987, control of the station passed to JR Kyushu.

== Passenger statistics ==
In fiscal 2015, there were a total of 5,125 boarding passengers, giving a daily average of 14 passengers.

== Surrounding area ==
- Japan National Route 203

== See also ==
- List of railway stations in Japan
