= Watada Station =

Railway station in Karatsu, Saga Prefecture, Japan

Watada Station 和多田駅
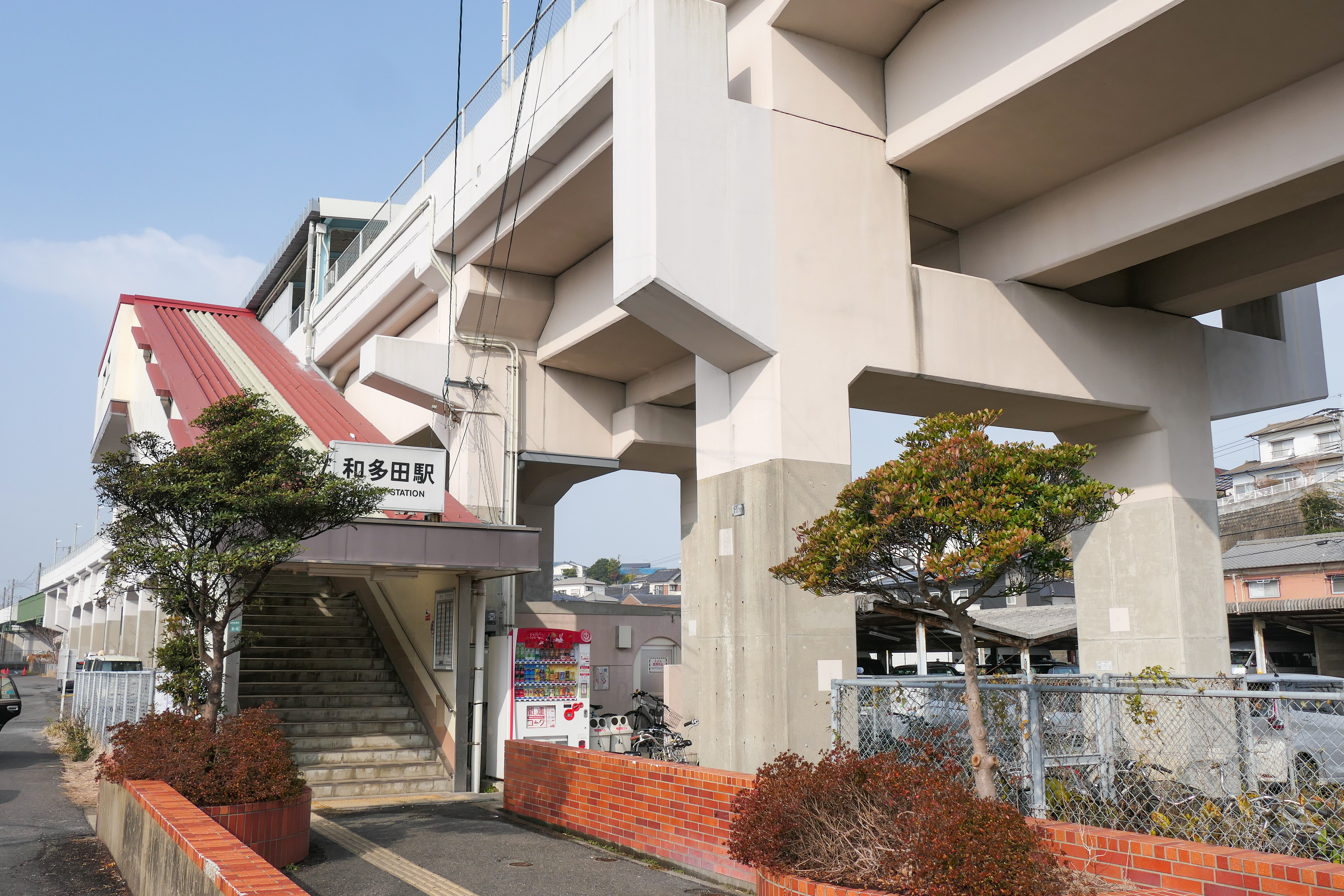
- Entrance of Watada Station in 2023

General information
- Location: 5 Watada Yōjaku, Karatsu-shi, Saga-ken 847-0075; Japan
- Coordinates: 33°26′14″N 129°58′49″E
- Operator: JR Kyushu
- Line: JK Chikuhi Line
- Distance: 40.9 km from Meinohama
- Platforms: 1 side platform

Construction
- Structure type: Elevated

Other information
- Status: Unstaffed, ticket machine
- Website: Official website

History
- Opened: 22 March 1983

Passengers
- FY2020: 293 daily
- Rank: 278th (among JR Kyushu stations)

Services
Preceding station	JR Kyushu	Following station
Karatsu towards Nishi-Karatsu	Chikuhi Line Local	Higashi-Karatsu towards Meinohama
Location
- Location within Saga Prefecture Location within Japan

Watada Station (和多田駅, Watada-eki) is a passenger railway station located in the city of Karatsu, Saga Prefecture, Japan. The station is operated by JR Kyushu.

== Lines ==
The station is served by the Chikuhi Line and is located 40.9 km from the starting point of the line at Meinohama. Local and weekday rapid services on the Chikuhi Line stop at this station.

== Layout ==
It is an elevated station with a single side platform. It is an unstaffed station with a ticket machine and a bathroom. The station is unattended.

== History ==
The station was opened on 22 March 1983. With the privatization of Japanese National Railways (JNR), the successor of JGR, on 1 April 1987, control of the station passed to JR Kyushu.

== Passenger statistics ==
In fiscal 2020, the station was used by an average of 293 passengers daily (boarding passengers only), and it ranked 278th among the busiest stations of JR Kyushu.

== Surrounding area ==
- Karatsu Commercial High School
- Karatsu City Daigo Junior High School
- Karatsu City Sotomachi Elementary School
- Karatsu Watada Post office

== See also ==
- List of railway stations in Japan
