= Chikuhi Line =

Railway line in Kyushu, Japan

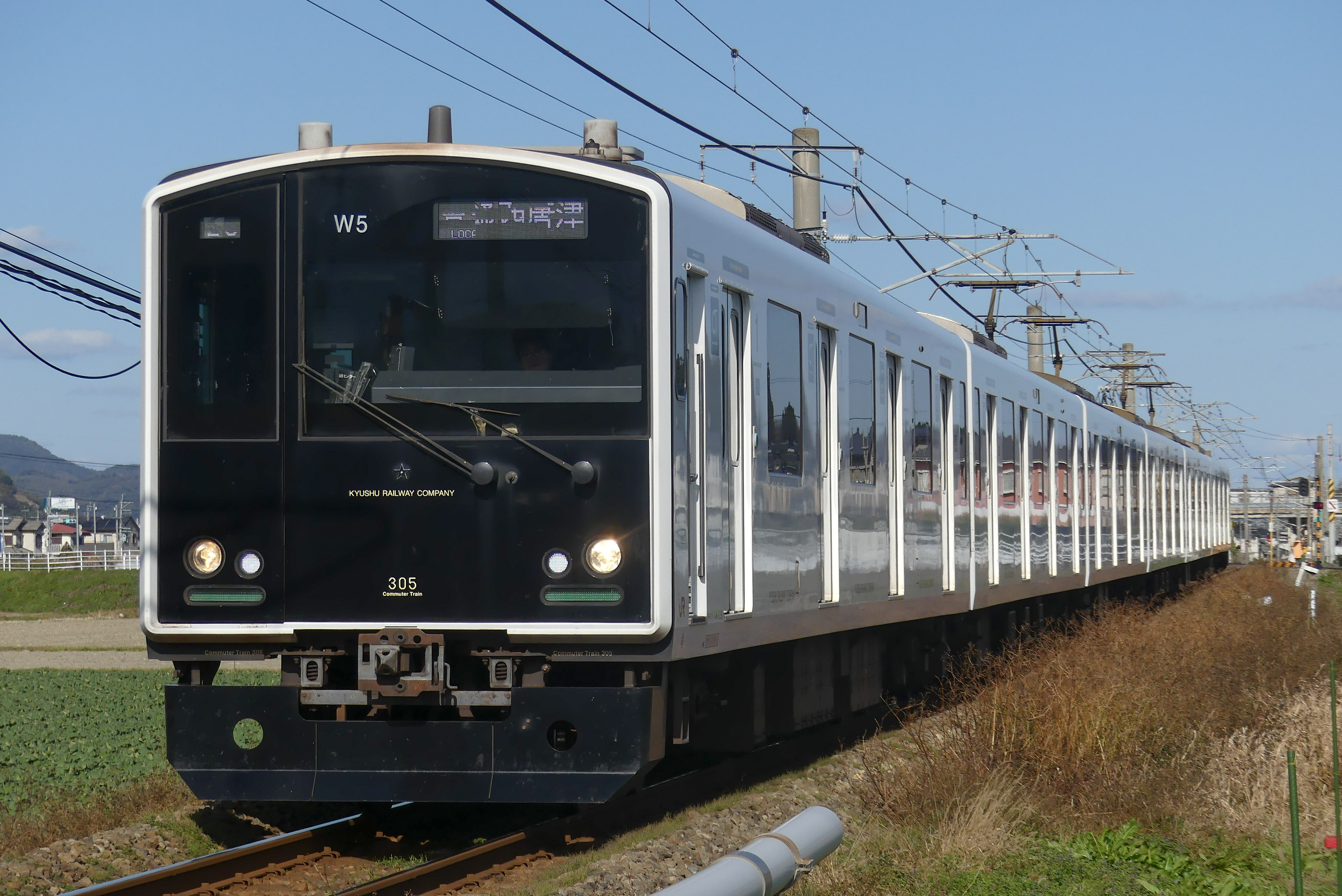
- 305 series on the Chikuhi Line January 2019

Overview
- Native name: 筑肥線
- Locale: Fukuoka, Saga
- Stations: 29

Service
- Type: Commuter rail
- System: JR Kyushu
- Operator(s): JR Kyushu

History
- Opened: 5 December 1923; 102 years ago

Technical
- Line length: 42.6 km (26.5 mi) (Meinohama–Karatsu); 25.7 km (16.0 mi) (Yamamoto–Inari)
- Track gauge: 1,067 mm (3 ft 6 in)
- Electrification: 1,500 V DC overhead (Meinohama–Nishi-Karatsu)
- Operating speed: 85 km/h (53 mph)
Route map
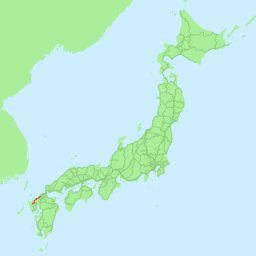

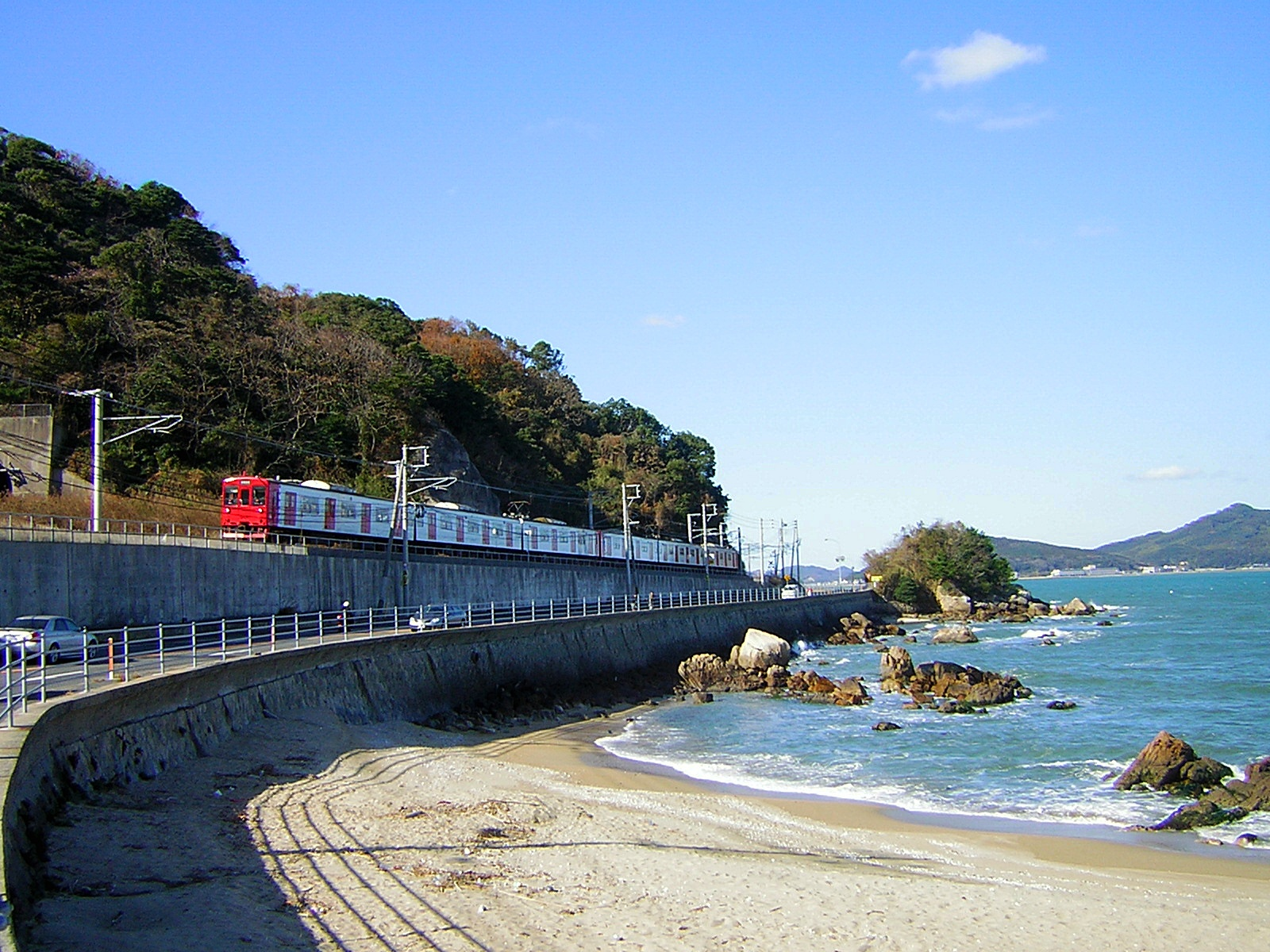
A 103 series EMU on the Chikuhi Line, December 2005

The Chikuhi Line (筑肥線, Chikuhi-sen) is a railway line in Kyushu, Japan. The line is split up into two parts; in the east, it runs between Meinohama Station in Fukuoka, Fukuoka and Karatsu Station in Karatsu, Saga, and in the west, between Yamamoto Station in Karatsu to Imari Station in Imari, Saga.

On the eastern section, most trains run via through service on both ends onto the Fukuoka City Subway's Airport Line toward Hakata Station, and to Nishi-Karatsu on the JR Karatsu Line. On the western section, all trains continue past Yamamoto onto the Karatsu Line to reach Karatsu Station, effectively connecting the two halves of the line.

== History ==
The Kita-Kyushu Railway opened the Fukuyoshi to Hamasaki section in 1923, extending it west to Higashi-Karatsu (situated on the east bank of the Matsuura River, opposite the Karatsu Line on the west bank) by 1925 and east to Hakata by 1926. The line was again extended west to Yamamoto where it junctioned with the Karatsu line (establishing Higashi-Karatsu as a reversing station in the process) in 1929, and to Imari in 1935. The company was nationalised in 1937 after which Japanese Government Railways (JGR) designated the track as the Chikuhi Line.

In 1983, the Hakata to Meinohama section was closed and replaced by a link to the Fukuoka City Subway Airport Line. A new line from Nijinomatsubara to Karatsu opened (including a new station called Higashi-Karatsu, situated about 1.5 km (0.93 mi) southeast of the original station of that name) and the entire section was electrified at 1,500 V DC to allow through running to Fukuoka via the subway. At the same time, the original Nijinomatsubara to Yamamoto section closed.

== Station list ==
=== Eastern section ===
●: Stops, ｜: Does not stop
Rapid Service: Stops at every station on the Airport Line.
Through service by Fukuoka City Subway commuter trains ends at Chikuzen-Maebaru.

No.	Station	Japanese	Distance (km)	Rapid service stops (weekdays)	Rapid service stops (weekends, holidays)	Transfers	Location	
↑ Through services to/from Fukuoka Airport via the Airport Line ↑
JK 01	Meinohama	姪浜	0.0	●	●	Airport Line (K01) (through service)	Nishi-ku, Fukuoka	Fukuoka
JK 02	Shimoyamato	下山門	1.6	●	|		Nishi-ku, Fukuoka	Fukuoka
JK 03	Imajuku	今宿	5.2	●	|		Nishi-ku, Fukuoka	Fukuoka
JK 04	Kyūdai-Gakkentoshi	九大学研都市	6.8	●	●		Nishi-ku, Fukuoka	Fukuoka
JK 05	Susenji	周船寺	8.1	●	|		Nishi-ku, Fukuoka	Fukuoka
JK 06	Hatae	波多江	10.1	●	|		Itoshima	Fukuoka
JK 07	Itoshima-Kokomae	糸島高校前	11.4	●	|		Itoshima	Fukuoka
JK 08	Chikuzen-Maebaru	筑前前原	12.7	●	●		Itoshima	Fukuoka
JK 09	Misakigaoka	美咲が丘	14.3	|	|		Itoshima	Fukuoka
JK 10	Kafuri	加布里	15.4	|	|		Itoshima	Fukuoka
JK 11	Ikisan	一貴山	16.7	|	|		Itoshima	Fukuoka
JK 12	Chikuzen-Fukae	筑前深江	20.1	●	●		Itoshima	Fukuoka
JK 13	Dainyū	大入	23.3	|	|		Itoshima	Fukuoka
JK 14	Fukuyoshi	福吉	26.1	|	|		Itoshima	Fukuoka
JK 15	Shikaka	鹿家	30.2	|	|		Itoshima	Fukuoka
JK 16	Hamasaki	浜崎	35.4	●	●		Karatsu	Saga
JK 17	Nijinomatsubara	虹ノ松原	37.5	|	|		Karatsu	Saga
JK 18	Higashi-Karatsu	東唐津	39.3	●	●		Karatsu	Saga
JK 19	Watada	和多田	40.9	●	●		Karatsu	Saga
JK 20	Karatsu	唐津	42.6	●	●	■ Karatsu Line (to Yamamoto/Saga)	Karatsu	Saga
↓ Through services to/from Nishi-Karatsu via the Karatsu Line ↓
JK 21	Nishi-Karatsu (Note: Part of the Karatsu Line.)	西唐津	44.8	●	●			

=== Western section ===
All trains running on this section stop at all stations.

Station	Japanese	Distance (km)	Connecting lines	Location	
↑ Through services to/from Nishi-Karatsu via the Karatsu Line ↑
Yamamoto	山本	0.0	■ Karatsu Line (through service)	Karatsu	Saga
Hizen-Kubo	肥前久保	5.1		Karatsu	Saga
Nishi-Ōchi	西相知	6.6		Karatsu	Saga
Sari	佐里	8.2		Karatsu	Saga
Komanaki	駒鳴	11.0		Imari	Saga
Ōkawano	大川野	12.9		Imari	Saga
Hizen-Nagano	肥前長野	14.3		Imari	Saga
Momonokawa	桃川	17.4		Imari	Saga
Kanaishihara	金石原	19.7		Imari	Saga
Kami-Imari	上伊万里	24.1		Imari	Saga
Imari	伊万里	25.7	■ Matsuura Railway: Nishi-Kyūshū Line	Imari	Saga

== Rolling stock ==
=== JR Kyushu ===
==== Current ====
- 103-1500 series six-car EMUs (9 trainsets) (since 1982) - these vehicles were replaced on the Fukuoka City Subway Kuko Line through service with the 305 series and now only operate as 3-car sets on the Chikuhi Line between Chikuzen-Maebaru and Karatsu/Nishi-Karatsu.
- 303 series six-car EMUs (3 trainsets) (since 22 January 2000)
- 305 series six-car EMUs (6 trainsets) (since February 2015)
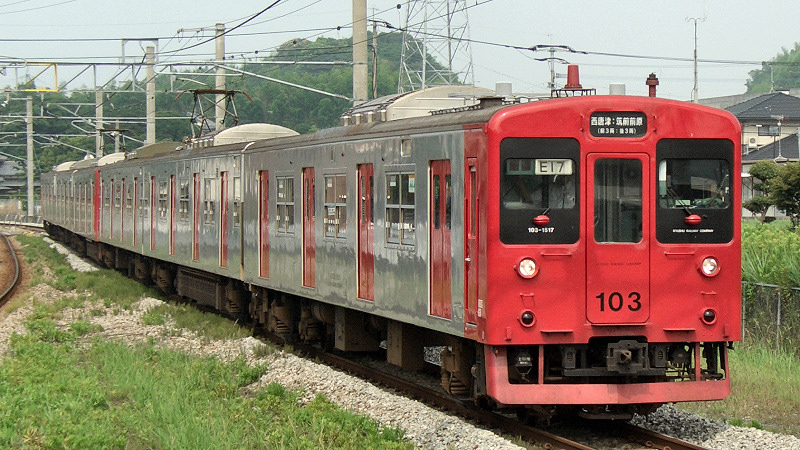
103-1500 series set E17 in August 2008

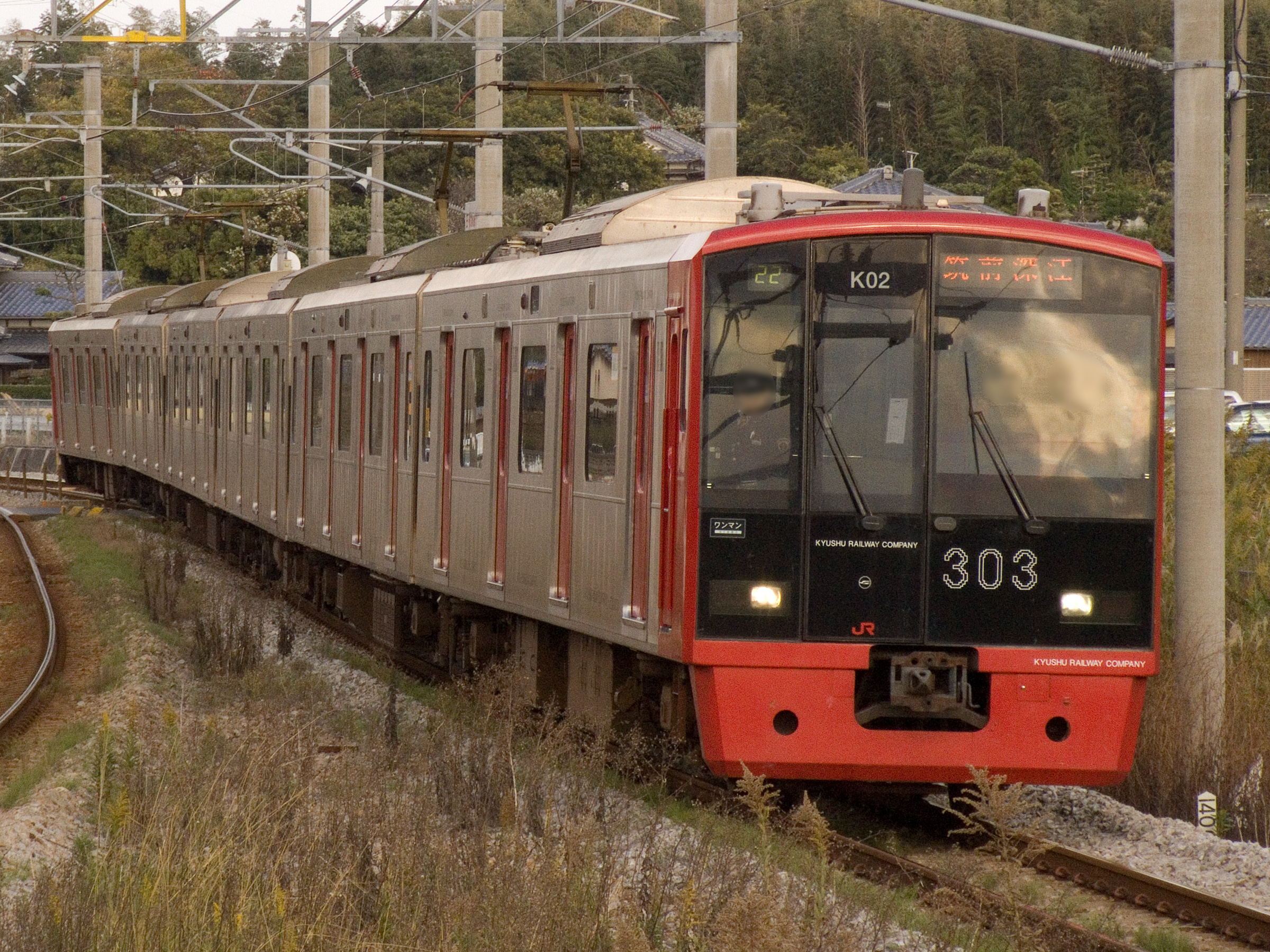
303 series set K02 in November 2009

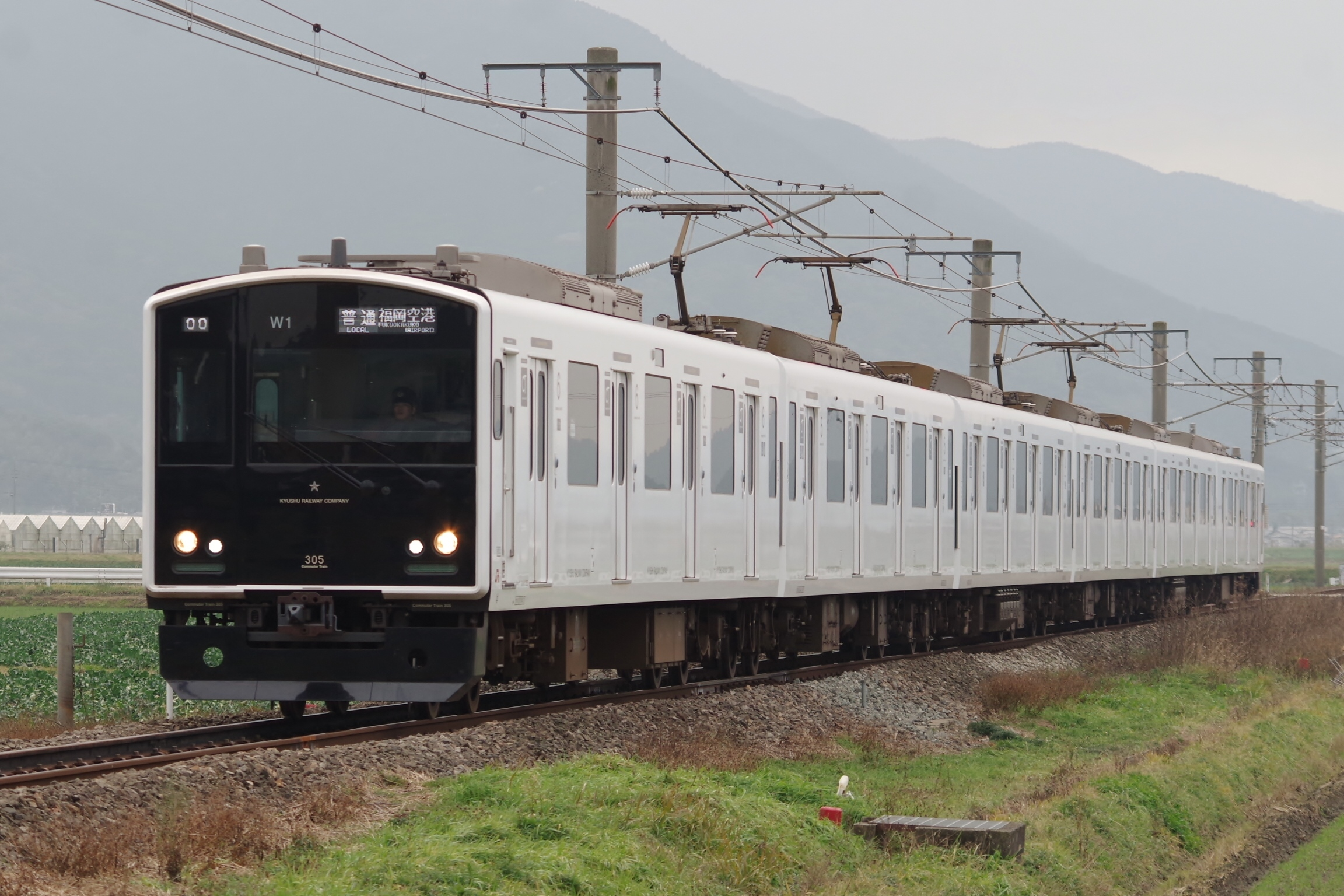
A 305 series set on the Chikuhi Line in January 2016

==== Future ====
Former Tokyo Waterfront Area Rapid Transit Rinkai Line TWR 70-000 series - to be operated as 2-car trains replacing the 103-1500 series trains on services between Chikuzen-Maebaru and Karatsu/Nishi-Karatsu.

=== Fukuoka City Subway ===
- 1000 series (since 1981)
- 2000 series (since 1992)
- 4000 series (since 29 November 2024)

Used in through services to Chikuzen-Maebaru.

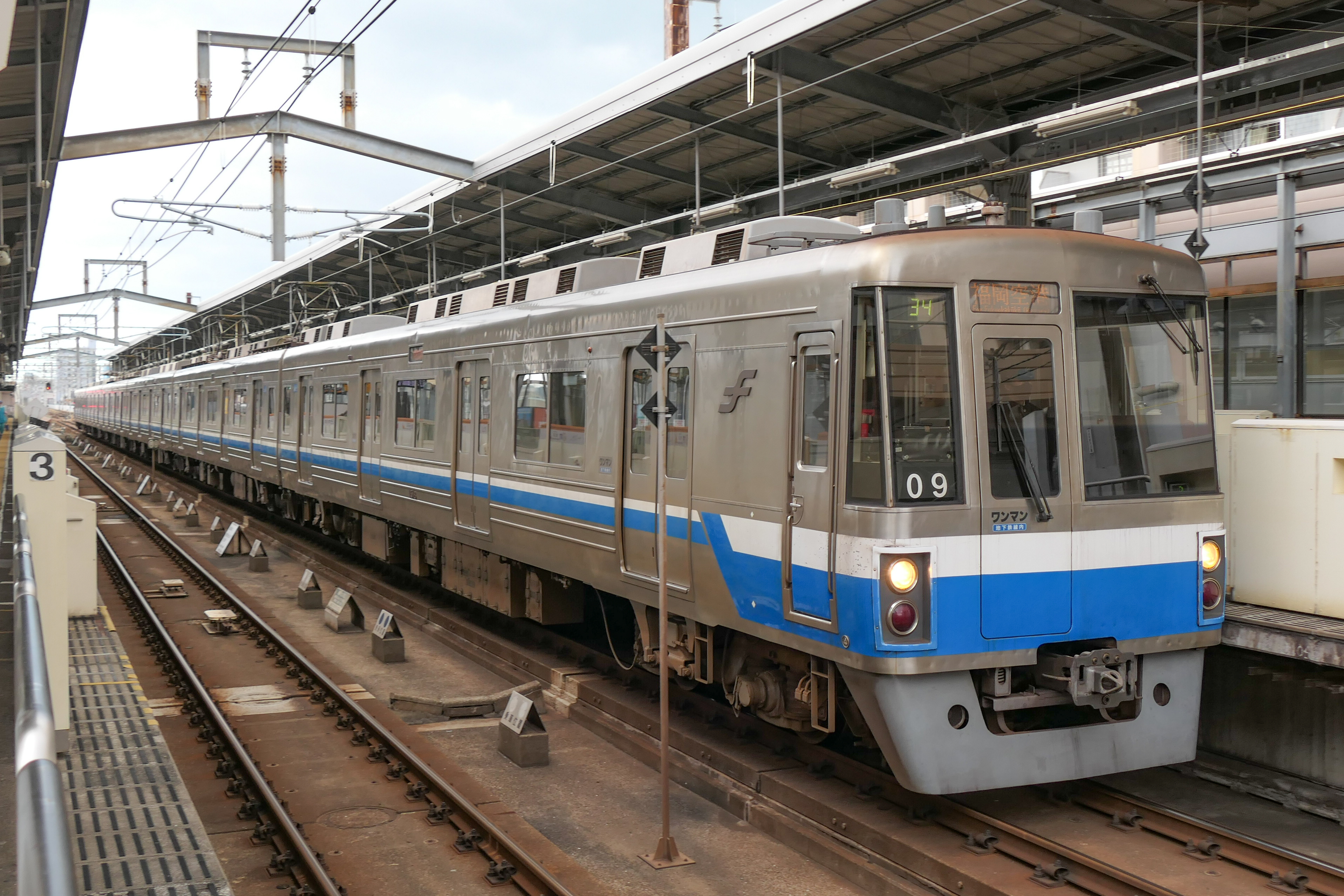
A 1000 series set in December 2021

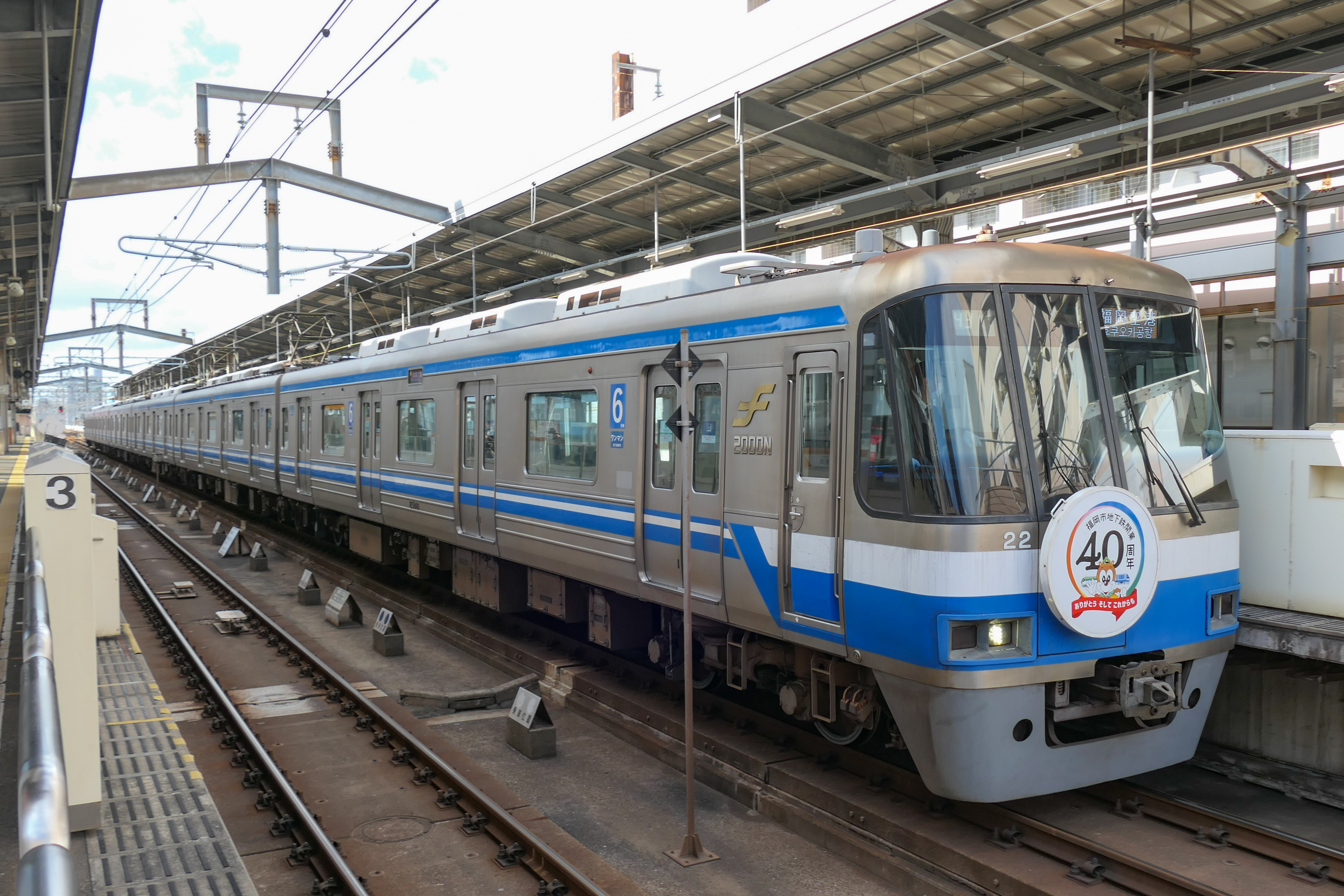
A 2000 series set in December 2021

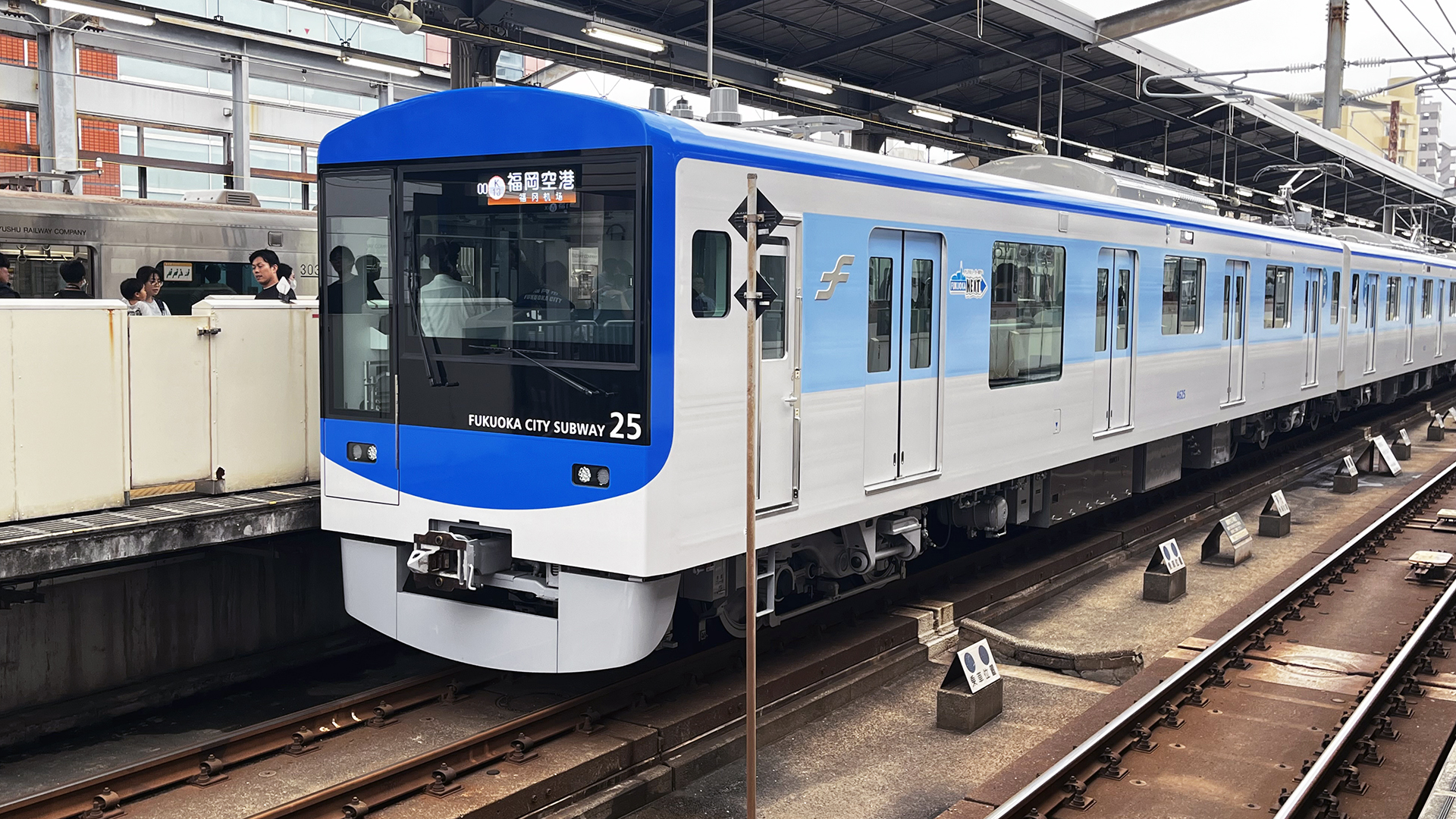
A 4000 series set in October 2024
