= Yamamoto Station (Saga) =

Railway station in Karatsu, Saga Prefecture, Japan

Yamamoto Station 山本駅
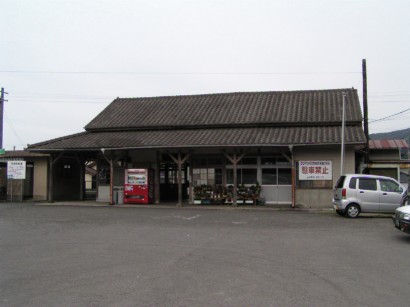
- Yamamoto Station in 2005

General information
- Location: Yamamoto, Karatsu-shi, Saga-ken 847-0002; Japan
- Coordinates: 33°23′34″N 129°58′52″E
- Operator: JR Kyushu
- Line: JK Karatsu Line JK Chikuhi Line
- Distance: 32.9 km from Kubota (Karatsu Line); 0.0 km (starting point of the western section of the Chikuhi Line)
- Platforms: 1 side + 1 island platforms
- Tracks: 3 + 2 sidings

Construction
- Structure type: At grade

Other information
- Status: Unstaffed
- Website: Official website

History
- Opened: 1 December 1898

Passengers
- FY2022: 254 daily
- Rank: 297th (among JR Kyushu stations)

Services
Preceding station	JR Kyushu	Following station
Honmutabe towards Kubota	Karatsu Line	Onizuka towards Nishi-Karatsu
Hizen-Kubo towards Nishi-Karatsu	Chikuhi Line	Onizuka towards Meinohama
Location
- Location within Saga Prefecture Location within Japan

Yamamoto Station (山本駅, Yamamoto-eki) is a passenger train station located in the city of Karatsu, Saga Prefecture, Japan. It is operated by JR Kyushu.

== Lines ==
The station is served by the Karatsu Line and is located 32.9 km from the starting point of the line at Kubota. The station is also the starting point for the western section of the Chikuhi Line to Imari. Trains of the Chikuhi Line use the Karatsu Line tracks from Karatsu to here before rejoining the Chikuhi Line track towards Imari.

== Station layout ==
The station consists of a side platform and an island platform serving three tracks at grade with two sidings branching off track 1. The station building is an old timber structure of traditional Japanese design with a double tiled roof. It is unstaffed and serves only to house a waiting room and an automatic ticket vending machine. Access to the island platform is by means of a level crossing with steps.

=== Platforms ===
1	■ JK Karatsu Line	for Karatsu and Nishi-Karatsu
2	■ JK Karatsu Line	for Taku, Kubota and Saga
2	■ JK Chikuhi Line	for Imari
3	■ JK Karatsu Line	for Karatsu and Nishi-Karatsu
3	■ JK Chikuhi Line	for Imari

== History ==
On 1 December 1898, the private Karatsu Kogyo Railway opened the station as the southern terminus of a track which it had built down the west bank of the Matsuura River from Miyoken (now Nishi-Karatsu). Yamamoto became a through-station on 13 June 1899 when the track was extended to Kyūragi. On 23 February 1902, the company, now renamed the Karatsu Railway, merged with the Kyushu Railway. When the Kyushu Railway was nationalized on 1 July 1907, Japanese Government Railways (JGR) took over control of the station. On 12 October 1909, the line which served the station was designated the Karatsu Line.

The private Kitakyushu Railway, which had a track between Hakata and Higashi-Karatsu by 1926 also expanded southwards a separate, parallel route down the east bank of the Matsuura River, establishing its southern terminus at Yamamoto on 20 June 1929. By 1935, the track had been extended west from Yamamoto to Imari. The Kitakyushi Railway was nationalised on 1 October 1937 and JGR, now in control, designated the track from Higashi-Karatsu through Yamamoto to Imari as part of the Chikuhi Line. For many years thereafter, Yamamoto was the only transfer station between the Karatsu and Chikuhi Line. On 22 March 1983, a new route for the Chikuhi Line was opened, with Highashi-Karatsu relocated and a through-track built across the Matsuura River from there via Watada to Karatsu. The stretch of track from Higashi-Karatsu down the east bank of the Matsuura River was closed. Chikuhi Line trains now used the Karatsu Line track down the west bank from Karatsu to reach Yamamoto before rejoining the western section of Chikuhi Line to Imari.

With the privatization of Japanese National Railways (JNR), the successor of JGR, on 1 April 1987, control of the station passed to JR Kyushu.

Yamamoto was also the terminal for a number of branch lines which have since closed. A branch to Ōchitankō opened in 1905 for freight closed in 1978. Another freight line to Kanokuchi opened in 1909 and closed in 1912. A branch to Kishitake opened in 1912 and closed in 1971.

== Passenger statistics ==
In fiscal 2020, the station was used by an average of 254 passengers daily (boarding passengers only), and it ranked 297th among the busiest stations of JR Kyushu.

== Surrounding area ==
- Karatsu Technical High School
- Saga Prefectural Hokubu School for the Handicapped
- Japan National Route 203

== See also ==
- List of railway stations in Japan
