= Higashi-Karatsu Station =

Railway station in Karatsu, Saga Prefecture, Japan

Higashi-Karatsu Station 東唐津駅
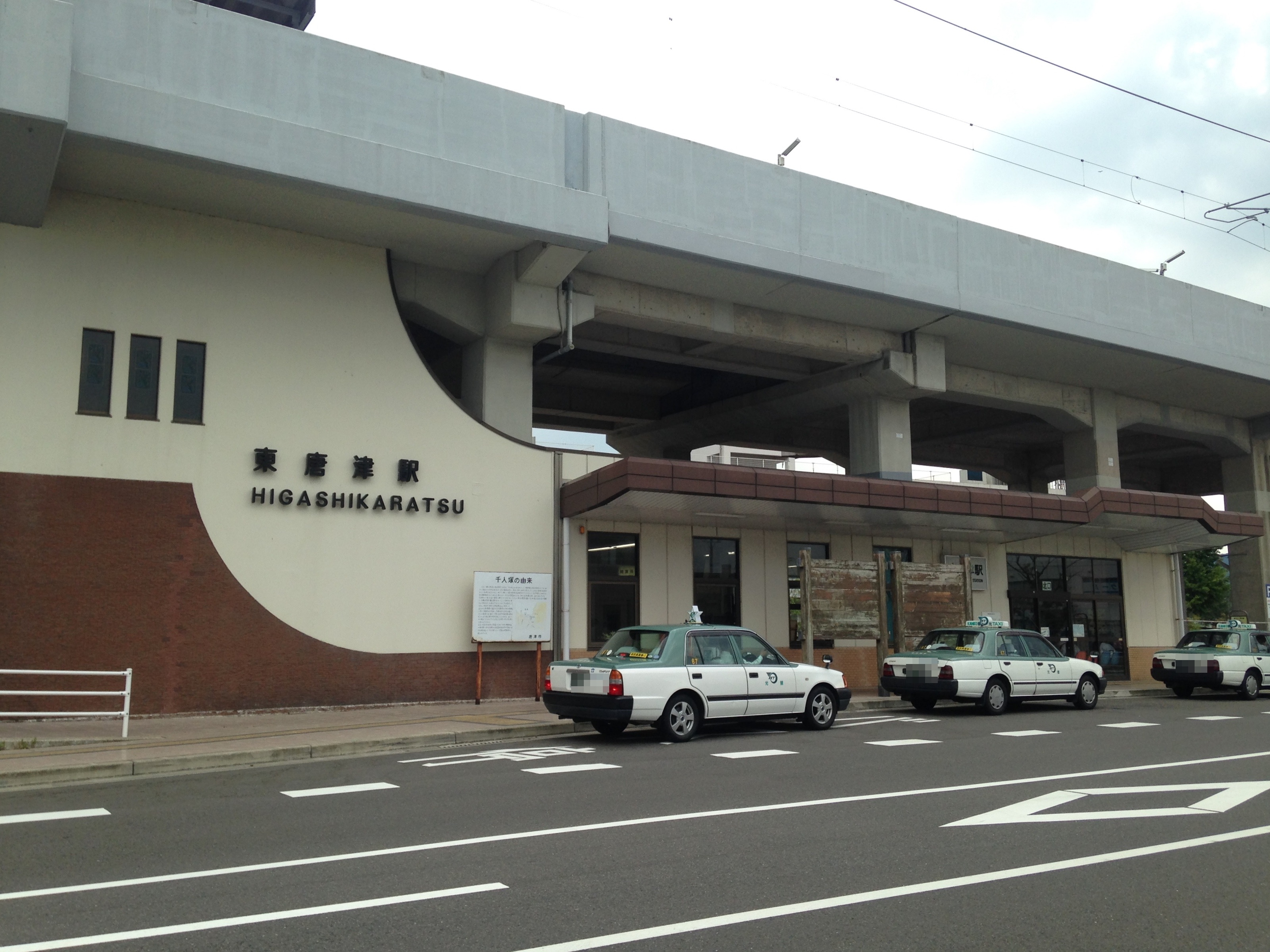
- The north entrance of Higashi-Karatsu Station in 2016

General information
- Location: 108-3, Shōnan-chō, Karatsu-shi, Saga-ken 847-0021; Japan
- Coordinates: 33°26′23″N 129°59′52″E
- Operator: JR Kyushu
- Line: JK Chikuhi Line
- Distance: 39.3 km from Meinohama
- Platforms: 1 island platform
- Tracks: 2

Construction
- Structure type: Elevated
- Cycle facilities: Bike parking under elevated structure
- Accessible: Yes - platforms served by elevators

Other information
- Status: Staffed ticket window (Midori no Madoguchi) (outsourced)
- Website: Official website

History
- Opened: 15 June 1925; 101 years ago

Passengers
- FY2020: 628 daily
- Rank: 195th (among JR Kyushu stations)

Services
Preceding station	JR Kyushu	Following station
Watada towards Nishi-Karatsu	Chikuhi Line Local	Nijinomatsubara towards Meinohama
Location
- Location within Saga Prefecture Location within Japan

Higashi-Karatsu Station (東唐津駅, Higashi-Karatsu-eki) is a passenger railway station located in the city of Karatsu, Saga Prefecture, Japan. It is operated by JR Kyushu and is on the Chikuhi Line.

== Lines ==
The station is served by the Chikuhi Line and is located 39.3 km from the starting point of the line at Meinohama. Rapid and local services on the Chikuhi Line stop at this station.

== Station layout ==
The station consists of an island platform serving two elevated tracks. The station building is located under the elevated structure and has both north and south entrances. It houses a waiting area and a staffed ticket window. The island platform is served by elevators. Parking for bicycles is available under the elevated structure.

Management of the station has been outsourced to the JR Kyushu Tetsudou Eigyou Co., a wholly owned subsidiary of JR Kyushu specialising in station services. It staffs the ticket counter which is equipped with a POS machine but does not have a Midori no Madoguchi facility.

=== Platforms ===
1	■ JK Chikuhi Line	for Chikuzen-Maebaru and Hakata
2	■ JK Chikuhi Line	for Karatsu and Nishi-Karatsu

== Gallery ==
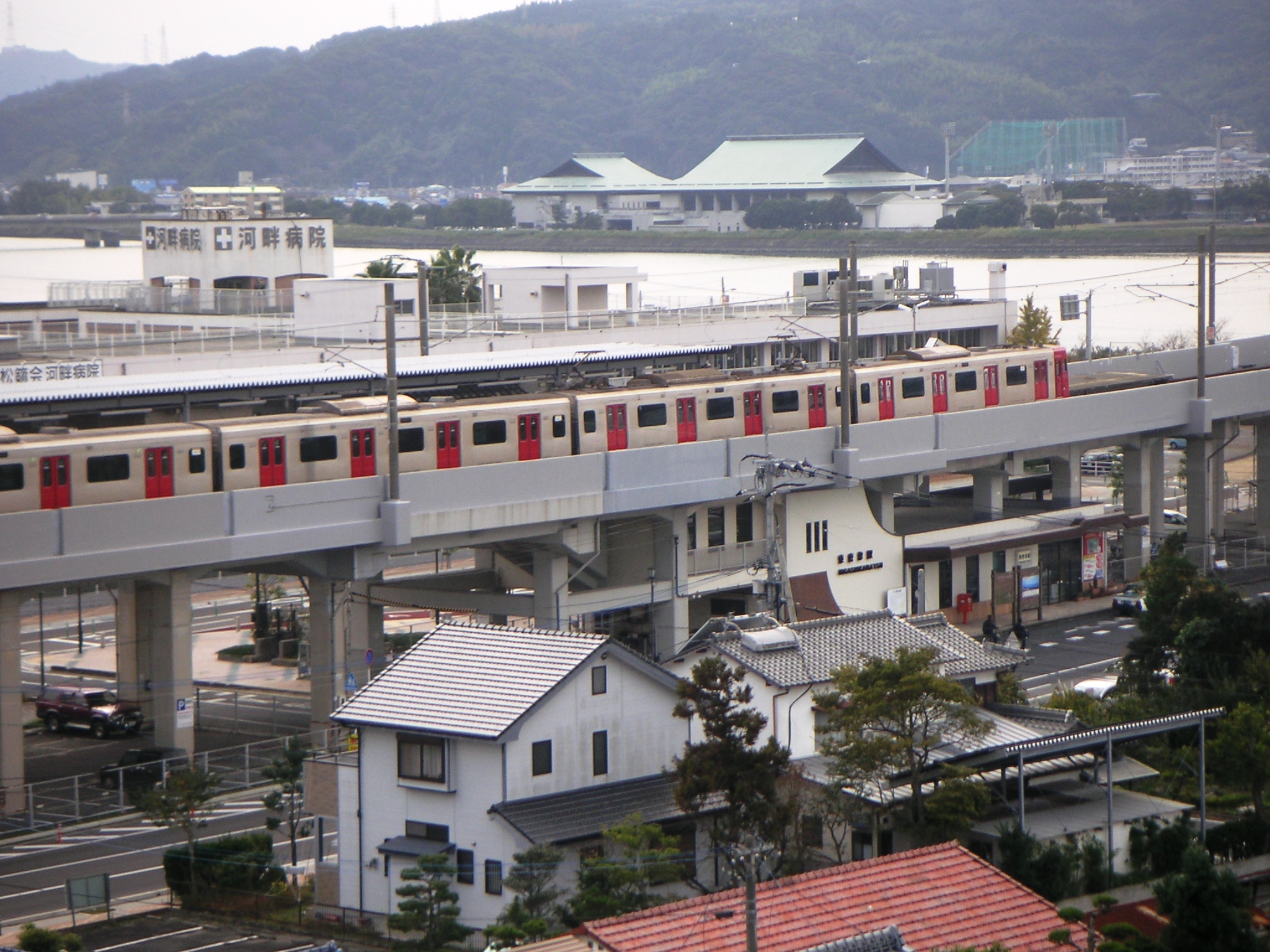
A distant view of the station with the Matsuura River in the background.

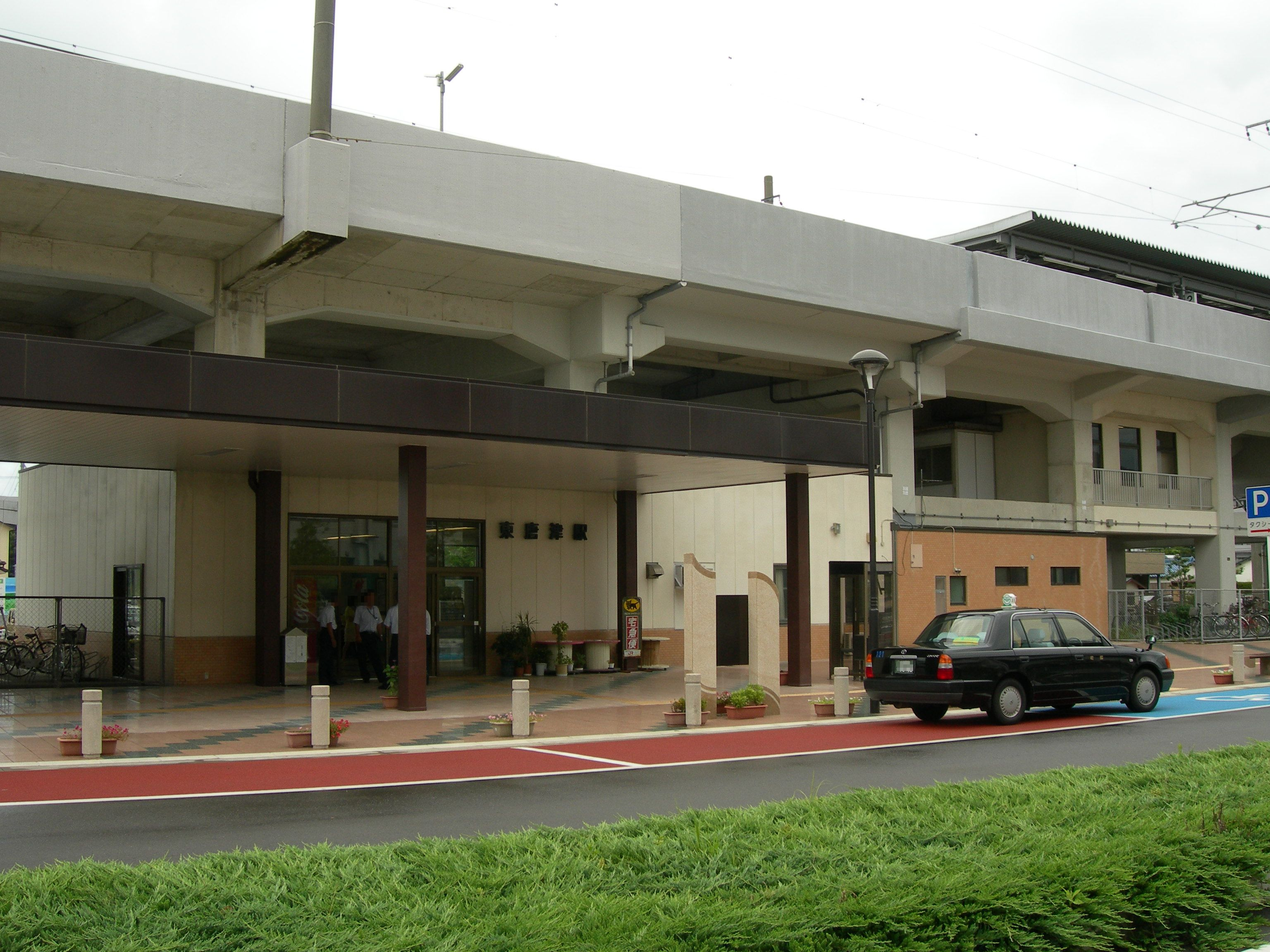
The south entrance of the station.

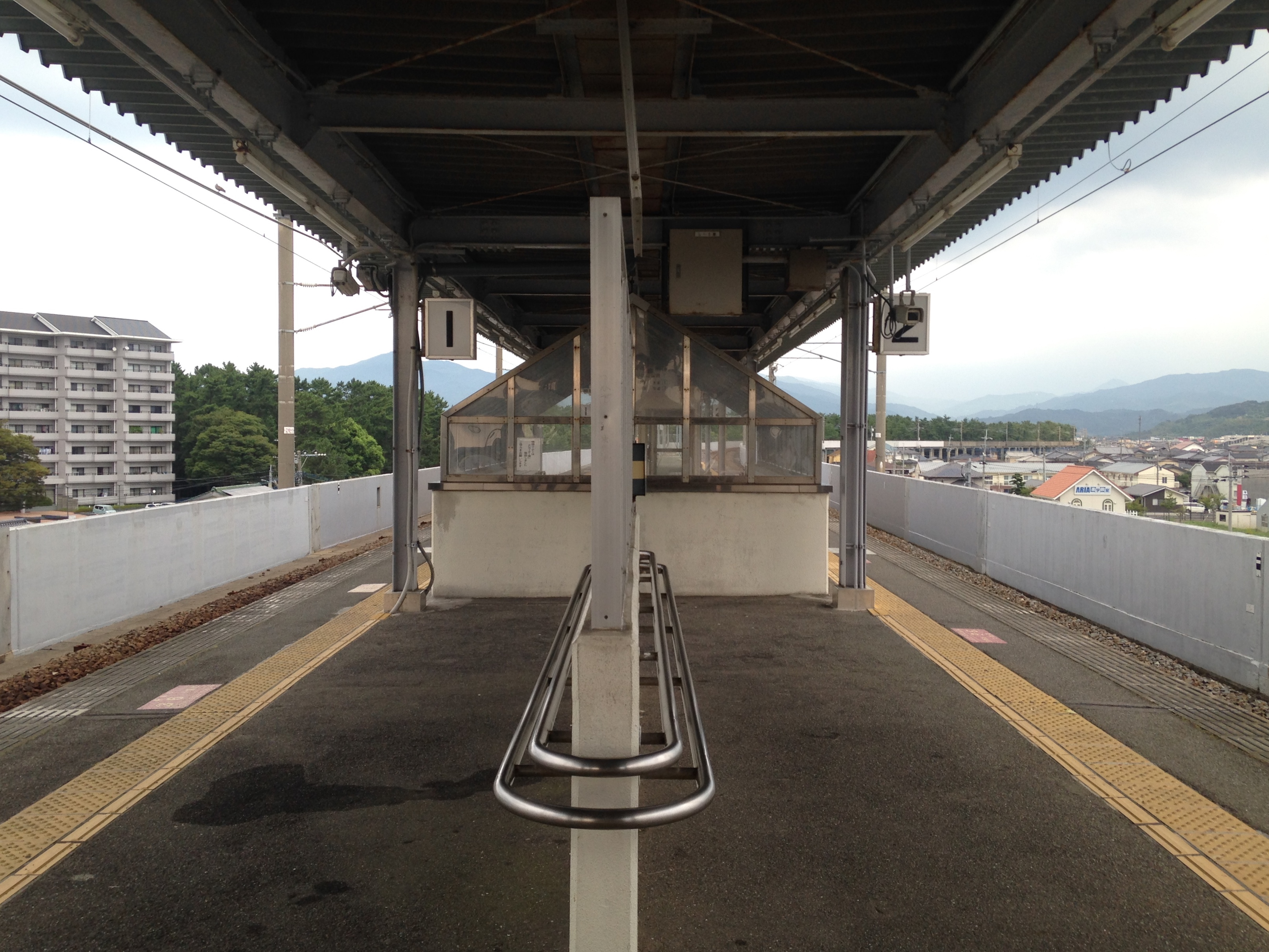
A view of the platform and tracks. Note the elevator shaft.

== History ==
The private Kitakyushu Railway had opened a line between Fukuyoshi and Hamasaki on 5 December 1923. By 1924, the line had been extended westwards to Nijinomatsubara. The line was extended again with Higashi-Karatsu opening on the east bank of the Matsuura River as the new western terminus on 15 June 1925. On 20 June 1929, the track was extended south down the east bank of the Matsuura River towards Yamamoto. Trains at Higashi-Karatsu executed a switchback before proceeding either south to Yamamoto or east to Nijinomatsubara. When the Kitakyushu Railway was nationalized on 1 October 1937, Japanese Government Railways (JGR) took over control of the station. The line which served the station was designated the Chikuhi Line.

The location of Higashi-Karatsu was inconvenient as the city centre of Karatsu lay on the west bank of the Matsuura River. Passengers wanting to access Karatsu station in the city centre had to travel a long dog-leg south via Yamamoto or make a road or foot journey across the river. In 1983, the station was moved, opening at a new location to the southeast on 22 March. A through-track was established across the Matsuura River via Watada to Karatsu. The stretch of track down the east bank to Yamamoto with the intermediate stations of Kagami and Kuri was closed. Along with this change of route, the track from Meinohama through Higashi-Karatsu to Karatsu was electrified.

With the privatization of Japanese National Railways (JNR), the successor of JGR, on 1 April 1987, control of the station passed to JR Kyushu.

== Passenger statistics ==
In fiscal 2020, the station was used by an average of 628 passengers daily (boarding passengers only), and it ranked 195th among the busiest stations of JR Kyushu.

== Surrounding area ==
- Karatsu Higashi Police Station
- Karatsu Business College
- Karatsu Royal Hotel
- Saga Prefectural Karatsu Higashi Junior High School & High School
- Karatsu Boat Racing

== See also ==
- List of railway stations in Japan
