= Imari Station =

Railway station in Imari, Saga Prefecture, Japan

Imari Station 伊万里駅
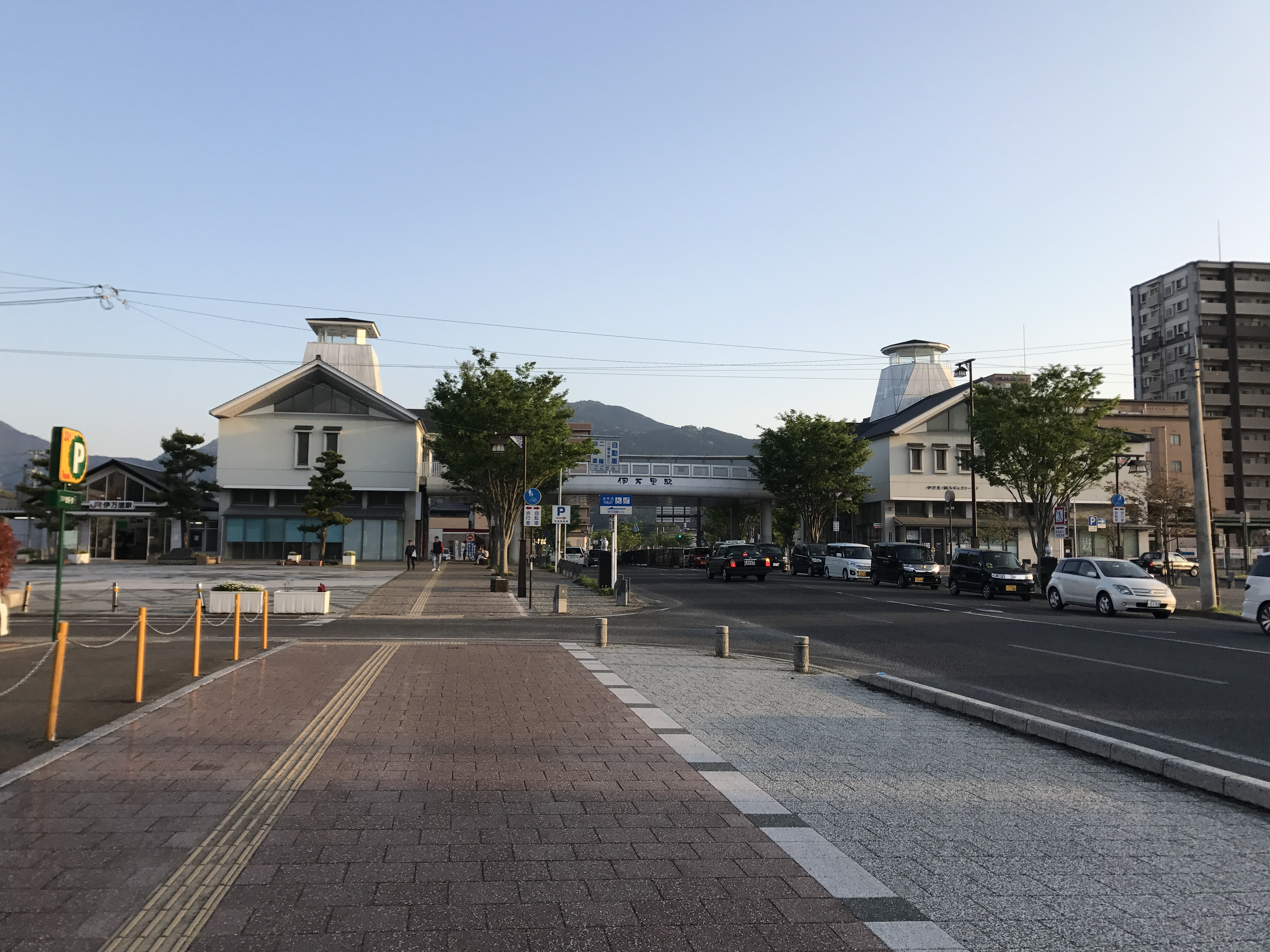
- Imari Station in 2017. The JR station is to the left, the Matsuura station to the right.

General information
- Location: 554 Shintenchō, Imari-shi, Saga-ken; Japan
- Coordinates: 33°16′17″N 129°52′36″E
- Operator: JR Kyushu; Matsuura Railway
- Lines: ■Chikuhi Line; ■Nishi-Kyushu Line
- Distance: 25.7 km from Yamamoto (Chikuhi Line); 13.0 km from Arita (Nishi-Kyushu Line)
- Platforms: 1 bay platform (Chikuhi Line); 3 bay platforms + sidings (Nishi-Kyushu Line)

Construction
- Structure type: At grade
- Cycle facilities: Bike shed

Other information
- Status: JR ticket window (Midori no Madoguchi) (outsourced); Matsuura Railway ticket window
- Website: JR Arita; Matsuura Railway

History
- Opened: 7 August 1898

Passengers
- 197 daily (JR Kyushu FY2015); 568 daily (Matsuura FY2015)
Location
- Location within Japan

Imari Station (伊万里駅, Imari-eki) is a train station located in Imari City, Saga Prefecture, Japan. It is a transfer station between the JR Kyushu Chikuhi Line and the third-sector Matsuura Railway Nishi-Kyushu Line.

== Lines ==
Imari is the western terminus of the western section of the Chikuhi Line and is 25.7 km from the starting point of this section at Yamamoto. The station is also served by the Nishi-Kyushu Line and is located 13.0 km from the starting point of the line at Arita.

== Layout ==
The station was once a through-station but the tracks JR and Matsuura tracks have since been divided. Each company now occupies separate premises with a road in between the two. The JR station consists of a bay platform serving a single track. The Matsuura station consists of three bay platforms serving three tracks, with several sidings branching off. There is no through-track at either station.

The JR station building, to the east, houses a waiting area and a ticket window. Management of the station has been outsourced to the JR Kyushu Tetsudou Eigyou Co., a wholly owned subsidiary of JR Kyushu specialising in station services. It staffs the ticket window which is equipped with a Midori no Madoguchi facility.

The Matsuura Railway station building is larger and houses a waiting area, a Matsuura ticket window, a cafe and shop. A link bridge runs above the road, connecting the two station buildings.

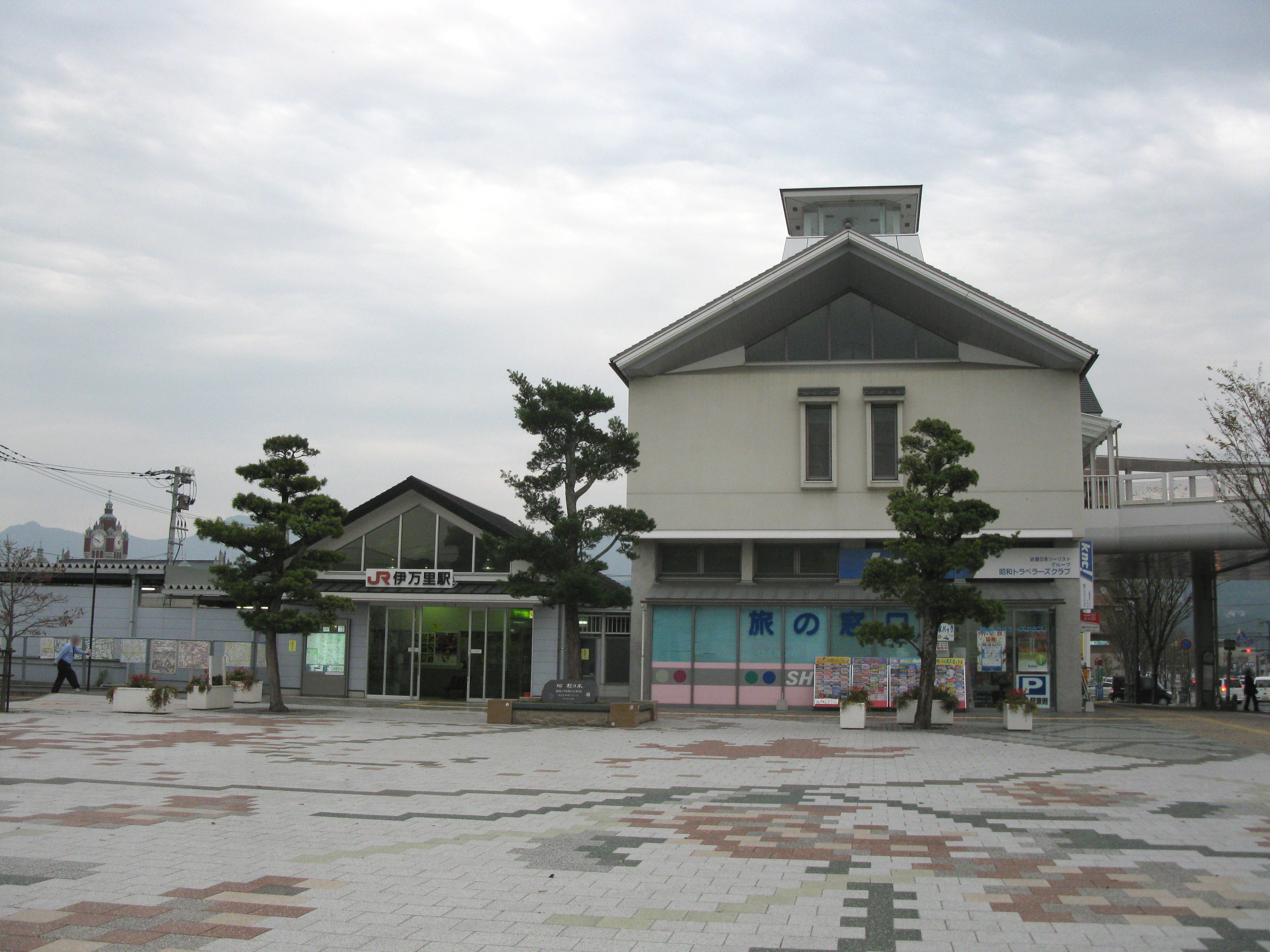
The JR station is the smaller building to the left. The larger building on the right which matches the Matsuura station design is used by another company.

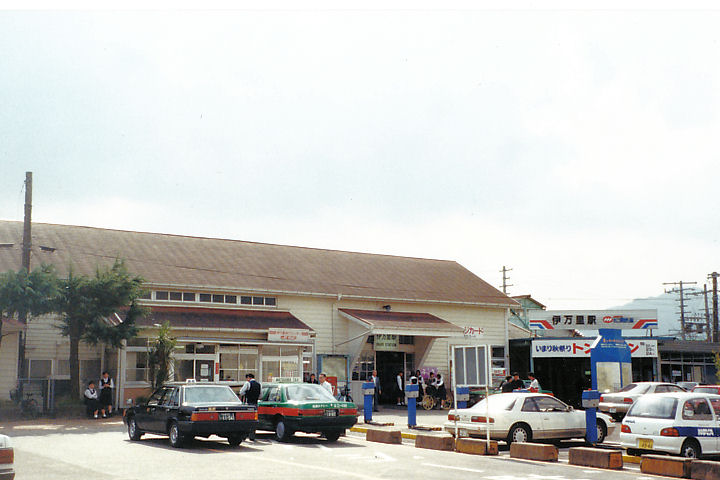
The old station building in 1993.

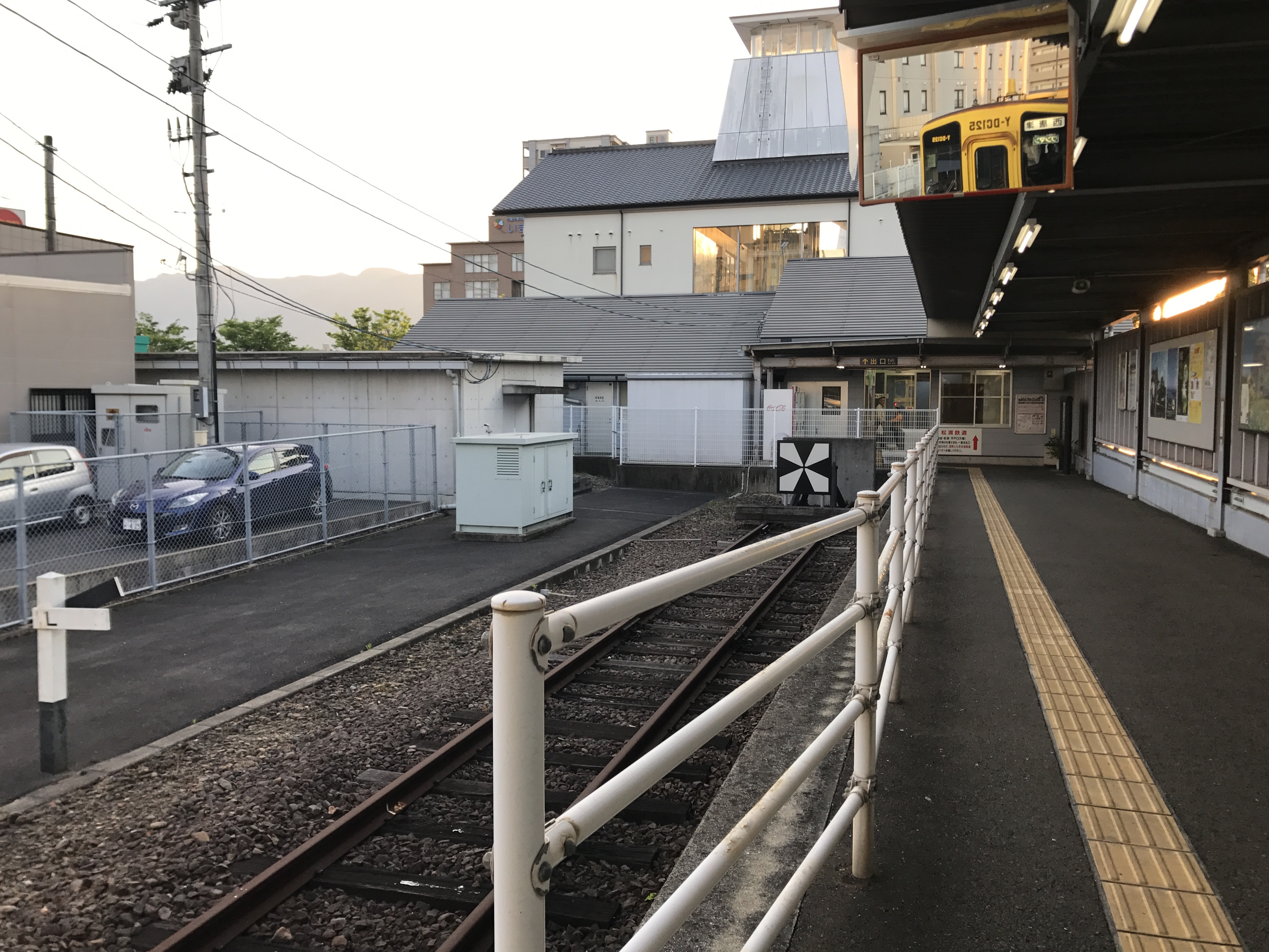
The single bay platform of the JR Kyushu station.

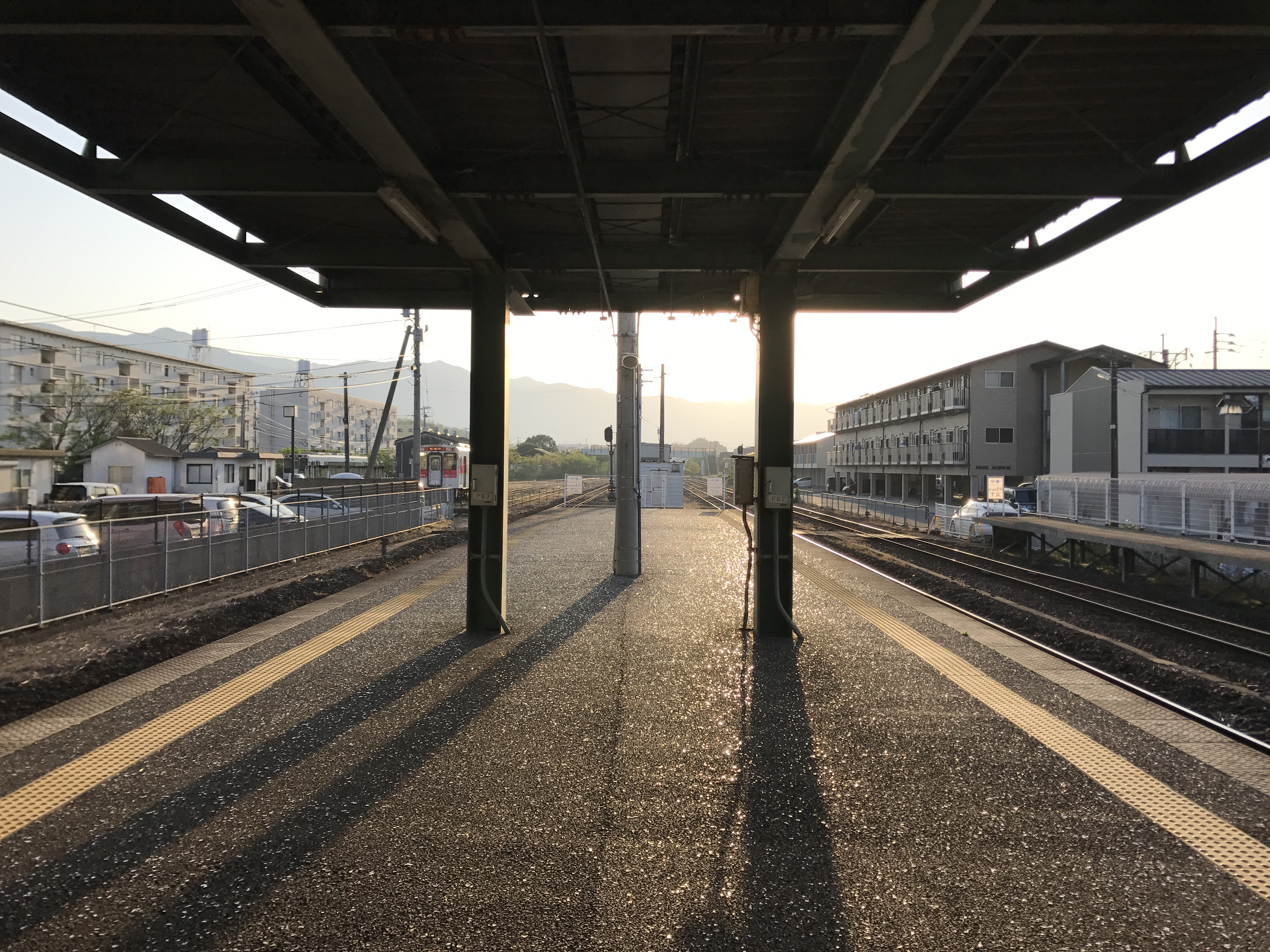
Platforms of the Matsuura Railway. Note the sidings beyond.

== Adjacent stations ==
←	Service	→
JR Kyushu
Chikuhi Line
Kami-Imari	Local	Terminus
Matsuura Railway
Nishi-Kyushu Line
Kawahigashi	Local	Terminus
Terminus	Local	Higashi-Yamashiro

== History ==
The station was opened on 7 August 1898 by the private Imari Railway as the northern terminus of a track which it had laid from Arita. The Imari Railway merged with the Kyushu Railway on 28 December the same year. The Kyushu Railway was nationalized on 1 July 1907 and Japanese Government Railways (JGR) took over control of the station. On 12 October 1909, the line serving the station was designated the Imari Line. JGR undertook the next phase of expansion when the track was extended west to Kusuku on 21 March 1930.

On 1 March 1935, Imari became a junction station when the private Kitakyushu Railway extended a track west from Yamamoto and established Imari as its western terminus. The Kitakyushu Railway was nationalised on 1 October 1937 and JGR designated this track the Chikuhi Line. On 1 March 1945, the track from Arita to Imari was designated as part of the Matsuura Line. With the privatization of Japanese National Railways (JNR), the successor of JGR, on 1 April 1987, control of the station passed to JR Kyushu. On 1 April 1988, the Matsuura Line was divested to the third-sector Matsuura Railway and the line was renamed the Nishi-Kyushu Line.

== Passenger statistics ==
For the JR station, in fiscal 2015, there were a total of 71,894 boarding passengers, giving a daily average of 197 passengers.

For the Matsuura Railway station, in fiscal 2015, there were a total of 207,497 boarding passengers, giving a daily average of 568 passengers.

== See also ==
- List of railway stations in Japan
