= Historic Site of Anti-Mongolian Struggle =

Fortress remains in Jeju, South Korea

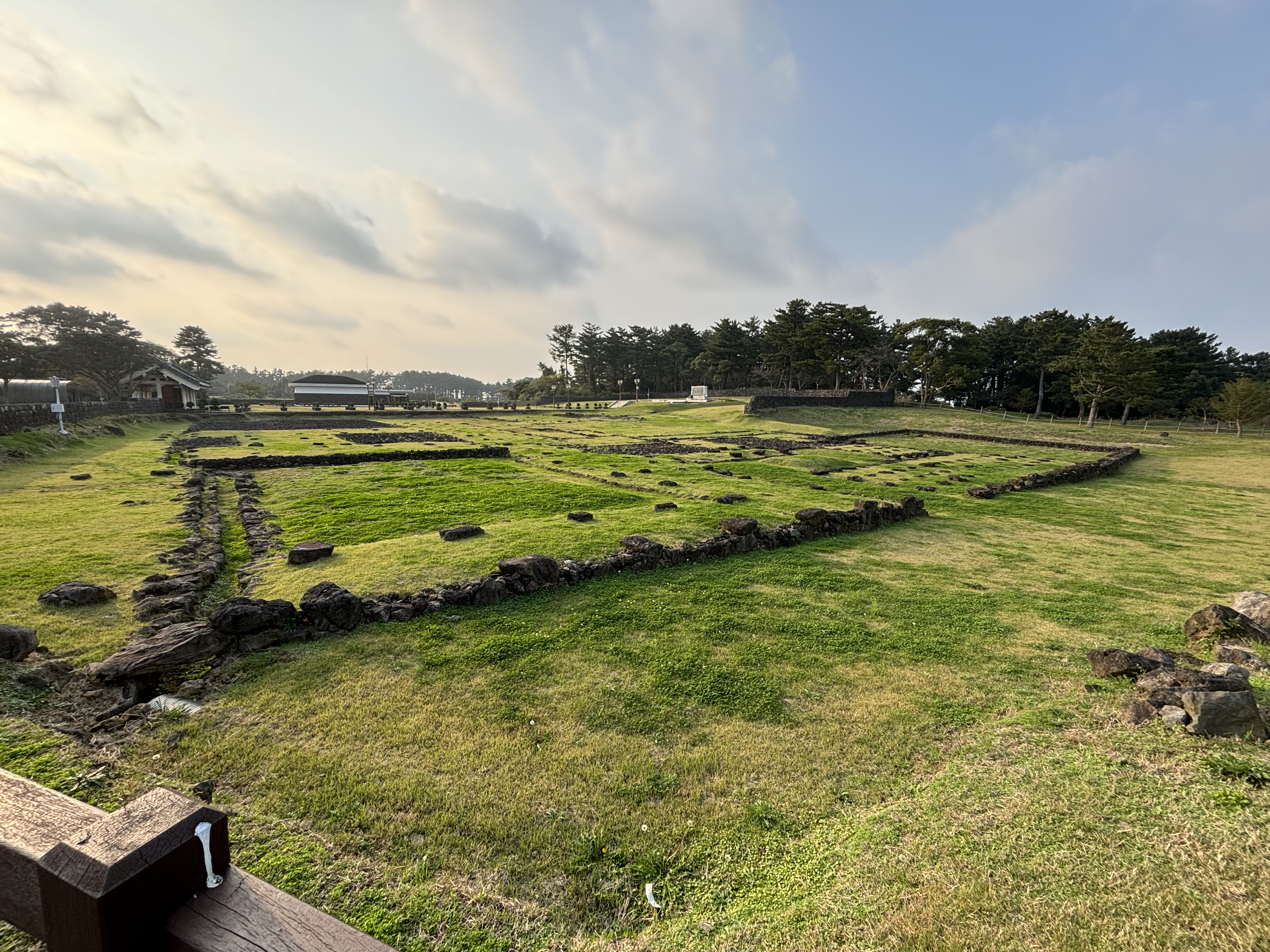
- The inner fortress from the southeast.

- Location within South Korea
- 33°27′9″N 126°24′27″E
- Type: Earthen fortress
- Location: 50, Hangpaduri-ro, Aewol-eup, Jeju-si, Jeju-do, South Korea; 1126-1, Goseong-ri, Aewol-eup, Jeju, Jeju-do and others 1009-4 Sanggwi-ri (inner fortress)

History
- Built: 1271–1272
- Built for: Sambyeolcho

Site notes
- Elevation: 140–250 metres (460–820 ft)
- Area: ~110 ha (270 acres)
- Governing body: Jeju City

Historic Sites of South Korea
- Official name: Historic Site of Anti-Mongolian Struggle in Hangpadu-ri, Jeju
- Designated: April 18, 1997

Korean name
- Hangul: 항파두리 항몽 유적
- Hanja: 缸坡頭里 抗蒙 遺蹟
- RR: Hangpaduri hangmong yujeok
- MR: Hangp'aduri hangmong yujŏk

The Historic Site of Anti-Mongolian Struggle (Korean: 항파두리 항몽 유적), also known as the Historic Site of Anti-Yuan Struggle and the Hangpaduri Hangmong Historic Site, is a protected area in Jeju Province, South Korea, that was once the location of an earthen fortress. This fortress, the Hangpadu/Hangpaduri Fortress (also written as Hangpadu(ri)seong), was built in 1271 by the Sambyeolcho rebels, who opposed the surrender by the Goryeo dynasty ruling Korea to the Yuan dynasty following the Mongol invasions of Korea. Built shortly after the Sambyeolcho took over the island of Jeju, the fortress soon became the capital of the rebellion after the Sambyeolcho were defeated elsewhere. Together with the Hwanhaejangseong coastal wall and various village fortifications, the fortress formed part of a defensive system to protect the island. After the Sambyeolcho forces were defeated by a combined Goryeo-Mongol invasion of 12,000 soldiers in 1273, the site eventually fell into disuse.

Hangpadu Fortress was constructed around 3 kilometres (1.9 mi) from Jeju's northern coastline, where the coastal lowlands transition into the mountainous interior. The chosen location provided views of important coastal areas, as well as the Jeju Strait and the Korean Peninsula to the north, where any invasions would originate. The specific site where the fortress was built lay between two rivers, which together with the sloped terrain provided natural defenses. The site also had soil conducive to the building of rammed earthen walls, and was positioned near existing population centers. Two layers of defense were built, creating an almost square inner fortress surrounded by 756 metres (2,480 ft) of walls, surrounded by a larger roughly oval area protected by 3.87 kilometres (2.40 mi) of walls. The inner fortress contained important buildings, including the Sambyeolcho headquarters. An additional wall extended from the north of the outer wall to protect two water sources.

Overall, the design of the fortress is similar to others built during the Goryeo era, including Ganghwasanseong Fortress and Yongjangseong Fortress, which were also built to repel Mongol invasion. Many artifacts found at the site are similar to those found on the mainland, and were likely brought to the island by Sambyeolcho forces. Some of the roof tiles found at the site reflect mainland designs, but are locally made, likely indicating that artisans came to the island with the Sambyeolcho. It is likely that roof tile techniques became more common in Jeju due to their use at Hangpaduri.

The site came to national attention in the late 20th century, when South Korean President Park Chung Hee saw it as a potential symbol of patriotism. In 1976, the site was recognized as a historic site by Jeju provincial authorities, and restoration works occurred from 1977 to 1978 that saw some of the outer walls rebuilt and a monument installed. Some excavations took place in the 1990s, and in 1997 the site was designated as National Historic Site No. 396. Sporadic further research followed, and a dedicated research program began in 2010. Today, the site serves educational and recreational purposes, and is sometimes used to host cultural events.

== Location ==
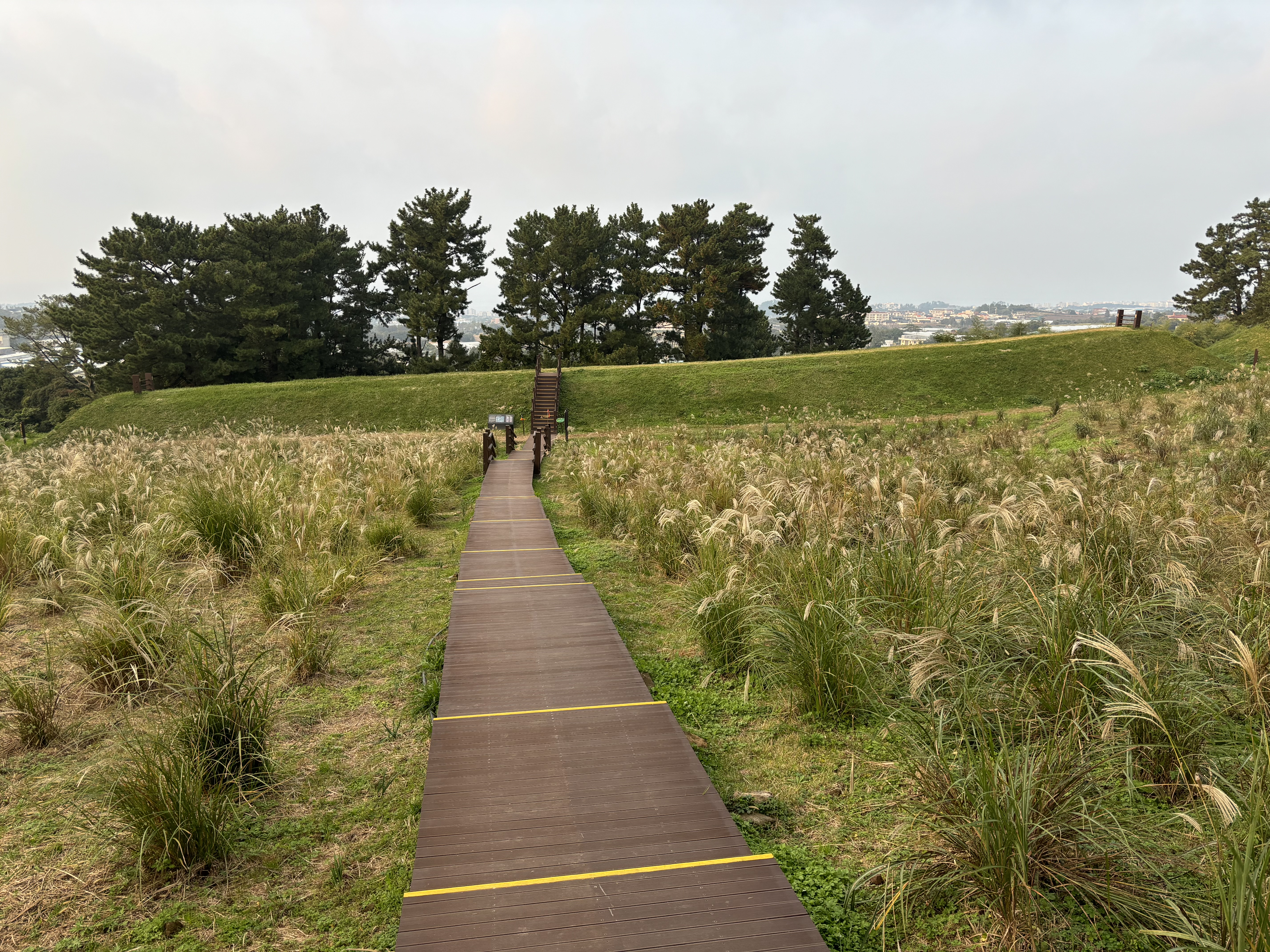
The northern outer wall, looking towards the Jeju Strait

The protected area is around 110 hectares (270 acres), of which 867,615 square metres (9,338,930 sq ft) is the designated historic site. The fortress was built inside an oreum around 3.1 kilometres (1.9 mi) south from the coastal village of Hagwi-ri. on the western side of the island, where the coastal lowlands meet the more mountainous interior. It lies on a hill between 140–250 metres (460–820 ft) above sea level. The landscape within the outer walls sloped upwards about 50 metres (160 ft) from north to south. On the eastern and western sides of the site were natural streams, Goseongcheon stream and Sowangcheon stream respectively.

The location was chosen to take advantage of existing topography. The northern, eastern, and western outer walls were built atop already steep terrain; the north atop a steep ridge, and the east and west overlooking drops towards rivers. These sides were thus protected by natural defenses. The position on the oreum meant the fortress was higher than the surrounding terrain, and was thus both defensible and provided a view of potential invasion routes, including naval routes due to its position overlooking the Jeju Strait and Chuja Islands. On clear days islands surrounding the southern end of the Korean Peninsula would also be visible, in the direction of Jindo. The soil at the site was suitable for creating earthen ramparts. There was also easy access to drinking water, and to wild game.

Existing defensive structures, such as Jeju Fortress, were likely seen as too difficult to defend, and having much poorer views of attack from the north. Surrounding the site were six of the sixteen major villages of the island at the time, making it the most populated part of the island. This meant the location could be easily supplied, and had access to six important ports along the northern coast.

== Structure ==
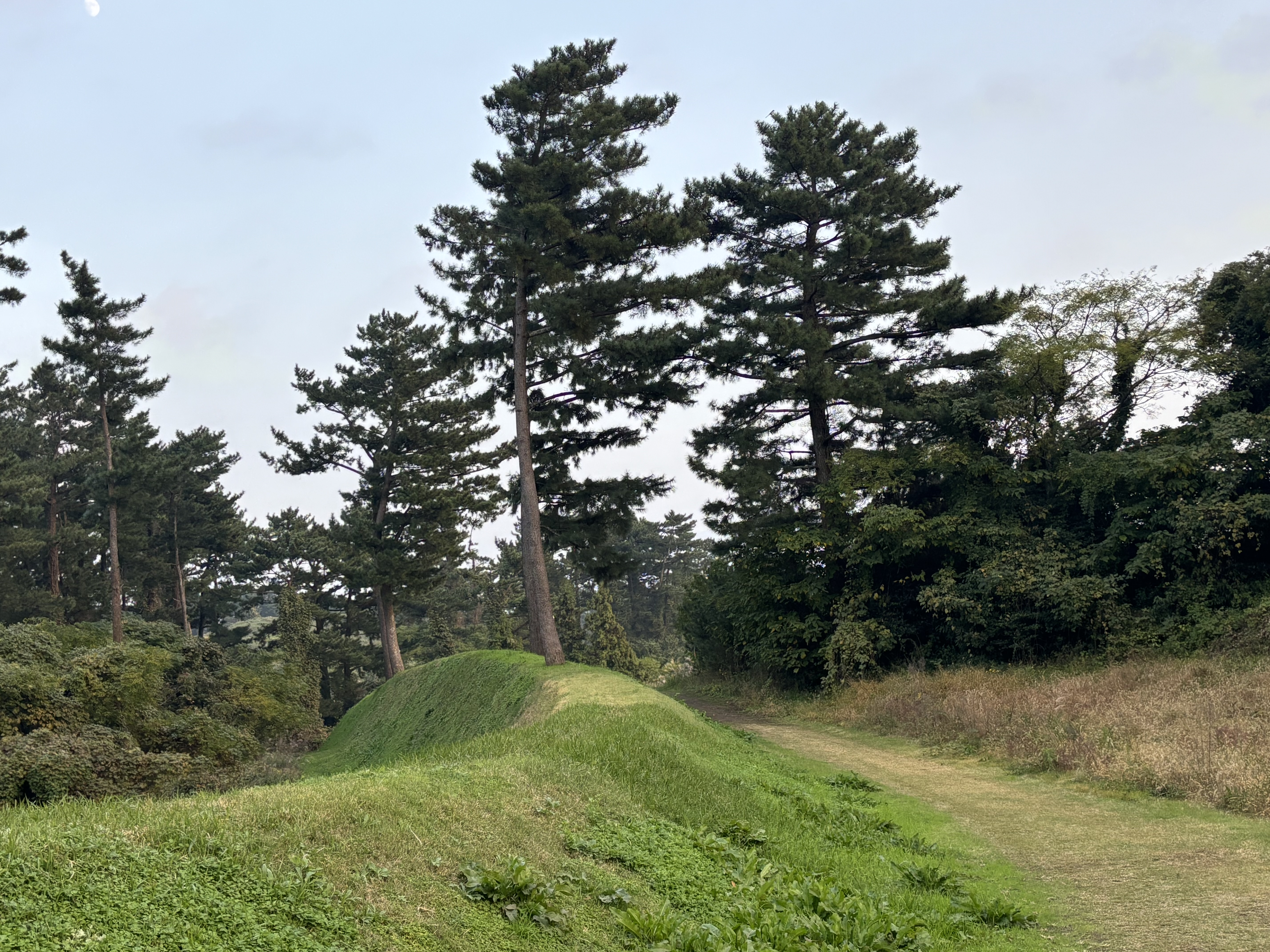
Outer wall on the eastern side of the complex

Hangpadu Fortress was the only earthen fortress constructed on Jeju. It was a double structure consisting of an inner complex and wall which was in turn surrounded by a larger area enclosed by a long earthen wall. Both walls are thought to have been at least 2 metres (6.6 ft) tall. Their construction involved layers of natural soil, clay, and stones. The stones tend to be around 30–50 centimetres (12–20 in). The inner fortress is sometimes referred to as naeseong (내성), while the outer walls are sometimes referred to as (go)toseong ((고)토성).

The inner wall forms a rough square of 756 metres (2,480 ft), consisting of an 178 metres (584 ft) northern wall, an 194 metres (636 ft) eastern wall, an 192 metres (630 ft) southern wall, and an 192 metres (630 ft) western wall. The base of the inner wall contains a row of stones and rammed earth. The inner fortress is mostly flat, ranging from 160 metres (520 ft) to 165 metres (541 ft) above sea level, with a gentle slope northwards. A drainage system moved water towards the east.

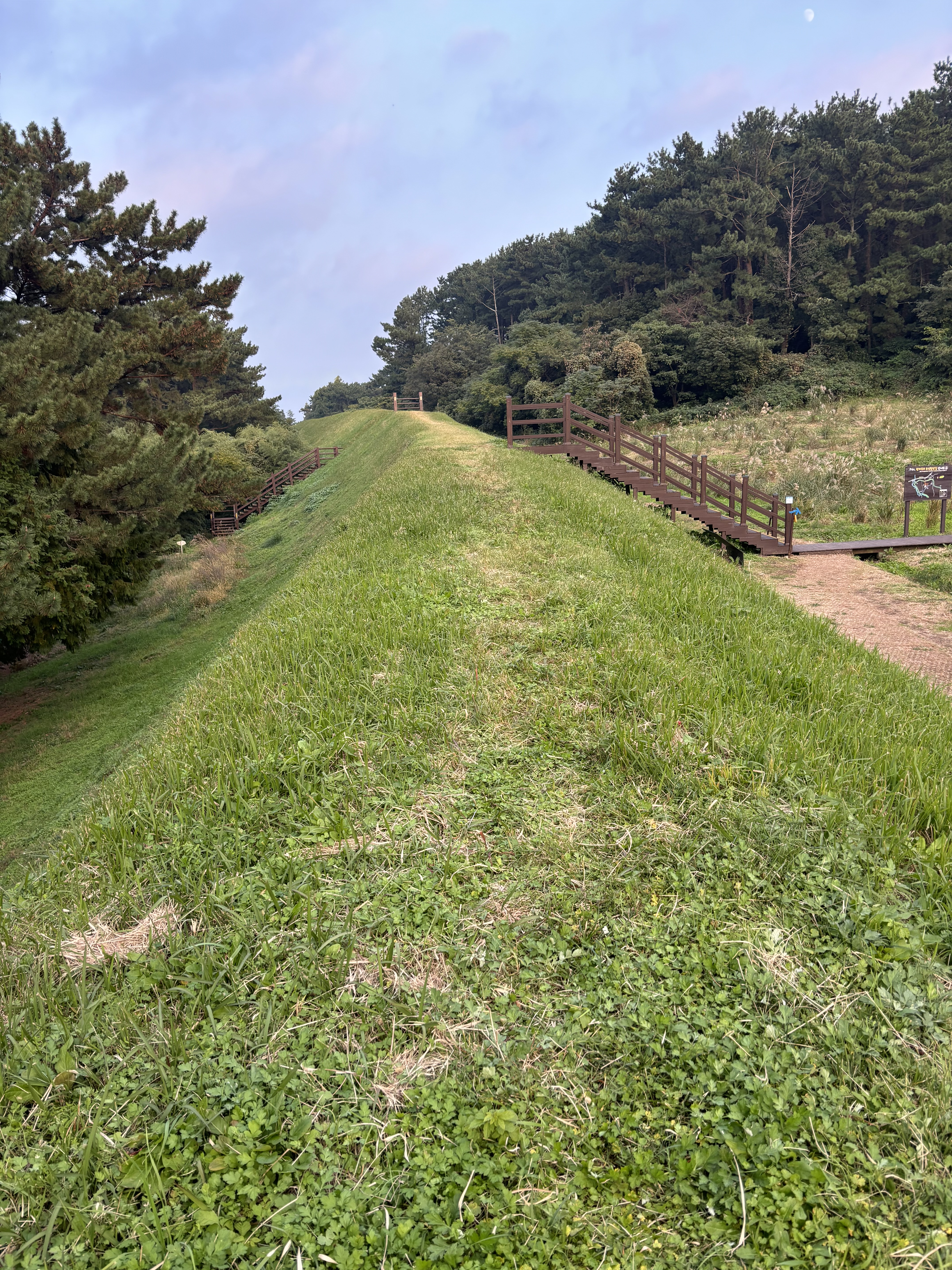
The top of the northern wall

The outer earthen wall was historically recorded as being 6 kilometres (3.7 mi) long, however modern research has measured it at 3.87 kilometres (2.40 mi). The outer walls follow the slope between the rivers in a somewhat oval shape. The diameter from the southeast to northwest is about 1,450 metres (4,760 ft), while the southwest to northeast axis is only 660 metres (2,170 ft). It is thought that there were four outer gates. The walls were accessed from the interior side via ramps. The outer wall structure can reach up to 10 metres (33 ft) wide and 3 metres (9.8 ft) tall. It is thought to have a stone base built on excavated bedrock, covered with layers of rammed earth.

The construction process and techniques seems similar to the one used at Ganghwasanseong Fortress, although adjusted for the local topography. Some techniques, such as filling a gap between two rows of stones with rubble, appear to be the same as techniques used at Ganghwasanseong. Other commonalities between the sites include the positioning of timber within the walls and the addition of an interior waterway. Adaptations include those made to accommodate different flooding risks, due to Hangpaduri being built on a hillside rather than on a mountain ridge. If the coastal Hwanhaejangseong is counted as a third surrounding wall for the Hangpaduri complex, the overall Triple wall structure imitates the Kaesong city walls.

The inner fortress was built near two springs. A semi-circular wall, also earthen, extending from the northern outer wall protected these water sources, known as the ongseong (옹성) spring and the gushi (구시) spring. The first was reportedly used only by the generals, while the second was used by the rest of the army.

Up to 17 buildings have been identified within the inner fortress. The buildings discovered include watchtowers, a roof tile facility, a well, and a kiln. The buildings were in the north-west of the inner fortress, likely directly connected to each other. They were constructed on platforms to account for the sloped terrain. One is thought to have served as the building for the Sambyeolcho leaders, and might have been larger than the equivalent in Yongjangseong. This building is sometimes also referred to the palace site, although unlike actual palaces (daegulteo, 대궐터) it was not built for royalty. The inner fortress as a whole is also sometimes referred to as the palace site. A watchtower (named 안오름 망대) has been found to the southeast of the fortress, at a high point of the oreum.

The Jangsumul Spring is in legend the site where general Kim T'ongjŏng's footprint remains after he jumped from the earthen walls. In the legend, it is this landing that caused the spring to run year round, and gave the water medicinal properties. The water is credited with protecting the residents of the nearby Goseongri village from an epidemic. Kim T'ongjŏng escaped the fortress with 70 soldiers to fight a final battle at the Bulgeun Oreum, and committed suicide. In some sources, the jump that caused the spring is recorded as the suicide.

The structure of the fort, including building compacted earthen walls with a stone foundation, and inner and outer walls, is of a similar design to that of other fortresses from the Goryeo dynasty period, such as Ganghwasanseong Fortress. Hangpadu may differ slightly in having stones lining both sides of the inner wall. It is likely that similar civil engineers worked on Ganghwasanseong Fortress, Yongjangseong Fortress, and Hangpadu Fortress, during the short period where all fell under the control of the Sambyeolcho Rebellion. Construction elements are also similar to other fortresses built around the same period, such as Gyeongjueupseong and Cheonghaejin. The layout of the Sambyeolcho fortresses, including Yongjangseong and Hangpaduri, resembled the layout of the pre-Mongol capital of Kaesong. This suggests they were intended to provide civilian governance as well as serve military purposes.

== Artifacts ==
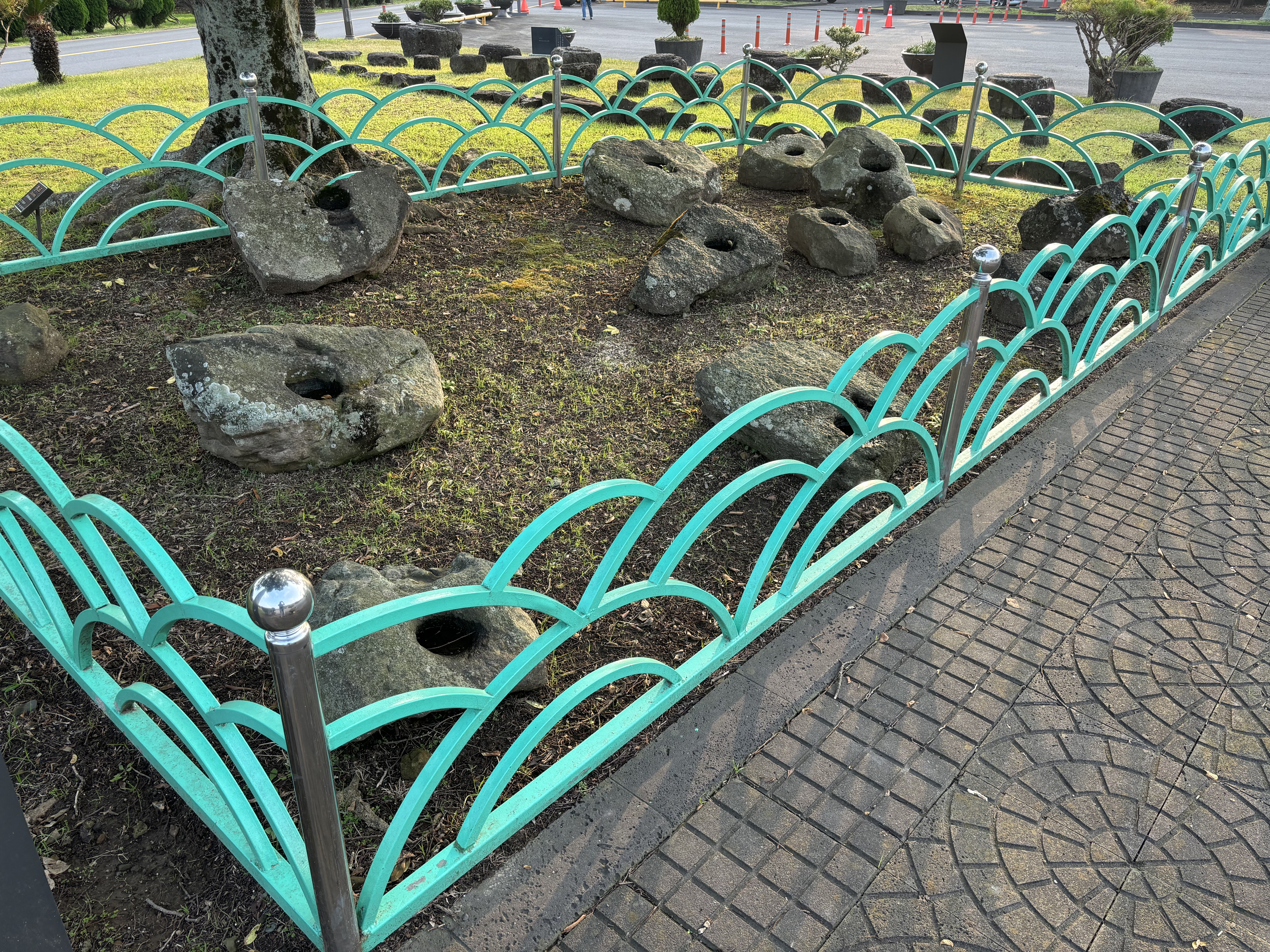
Stone hinges excavated at the site

Celadon products make up 60% of archaeological items found in the fortress. Much of this was likely produced in the 13th century. Bronzeware, celadon, and ironware from the site resemble similar items found at Samyeolcho fortresses elsewhere, such as from Jindo, and so are thought to have been brought to Jeju by Sambyeolcho forces. Some ceramics appear to be from Yuan China. Iron finds include crockery and armor. Other finds include coins and a stone Gonu board. Some of these coins were found under walls, suggesting they were deliberately buried there, likely as part of a ritual during construction. The Gonu board is made from Jeju rock, indicating local origin rather than coming with the Samyeolcho. 10 cornerstones (doljjeogwi, 돌쩌귀), or stone hinges, thought to have been located under the fortress' four gates have been found and are displayed at the site. Excavations have uncovered many items from the 13th century, although there are also items from the 12th and 14th centuries. It is possible that some artifacts from the site may date to the 15th or 16th centuries, indicating the site was used long after the Sambyeolcho Rebellion, but this is unconfirmed.

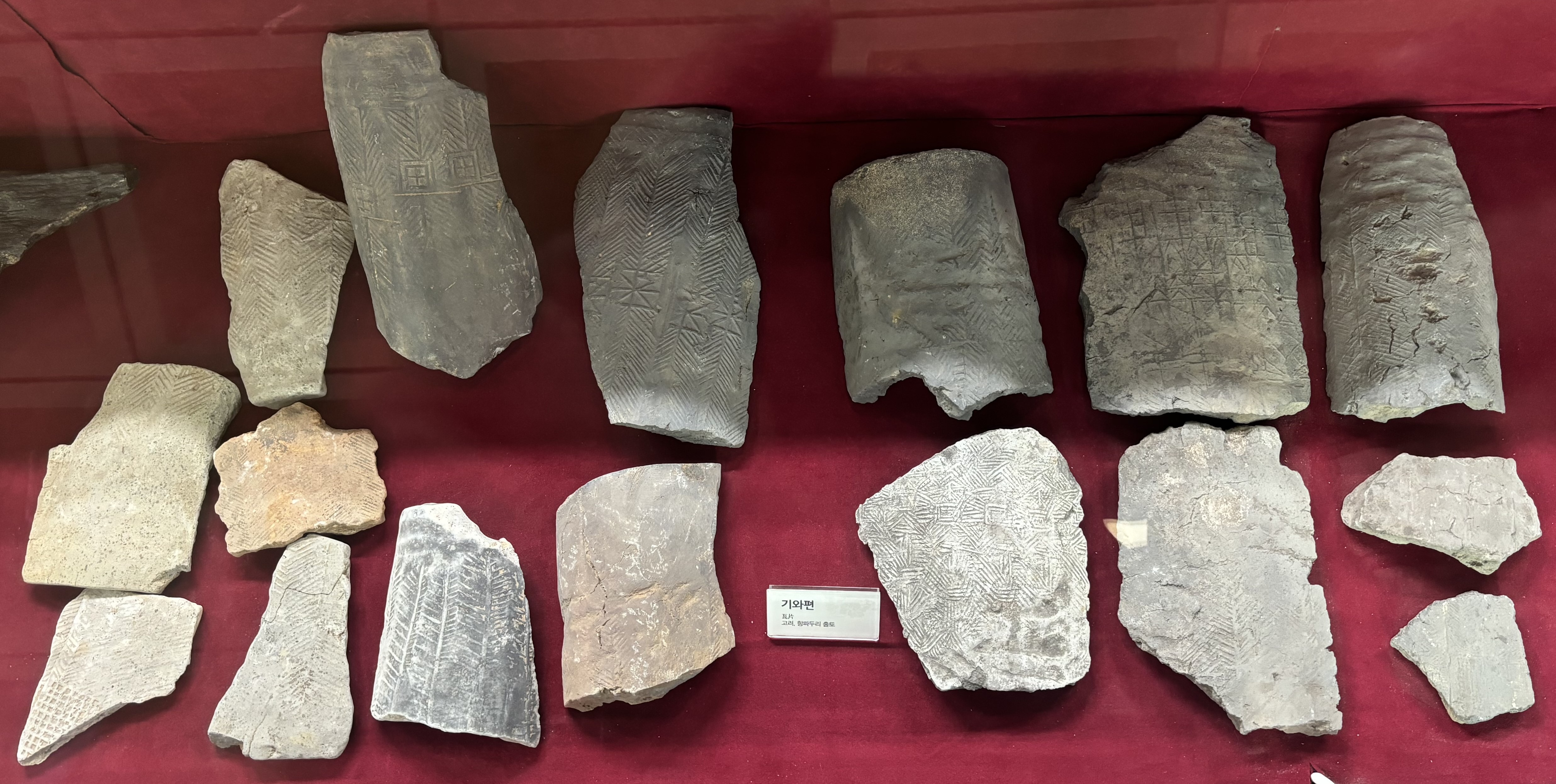
Roof tiles found during excavations

Roof tiles have been discovered with a number of different designs. Some may have come from the mainland, including patterns also found in Jindo, while others are thought to have come from surrounding villages and have patterns that may have been in use before the arrival of the Sambyeolcho. The roof tiles used in the fortress resemble those used in other Sambyeolcho fortresses, suggesting they were made by artisans who retreated to the island with the Sambyeolcho. This was an early example of roof tile production on Jeju, where they were rare at best prior to the Goryeo period. The techniques to create such tiles likely spread from Hangpadu to the rest of the island, even after the defeat of the Sambyeolcho. The inscriptions on the tiles have provided possible insights into the administrative structure of Jeju during that period.

== History ==
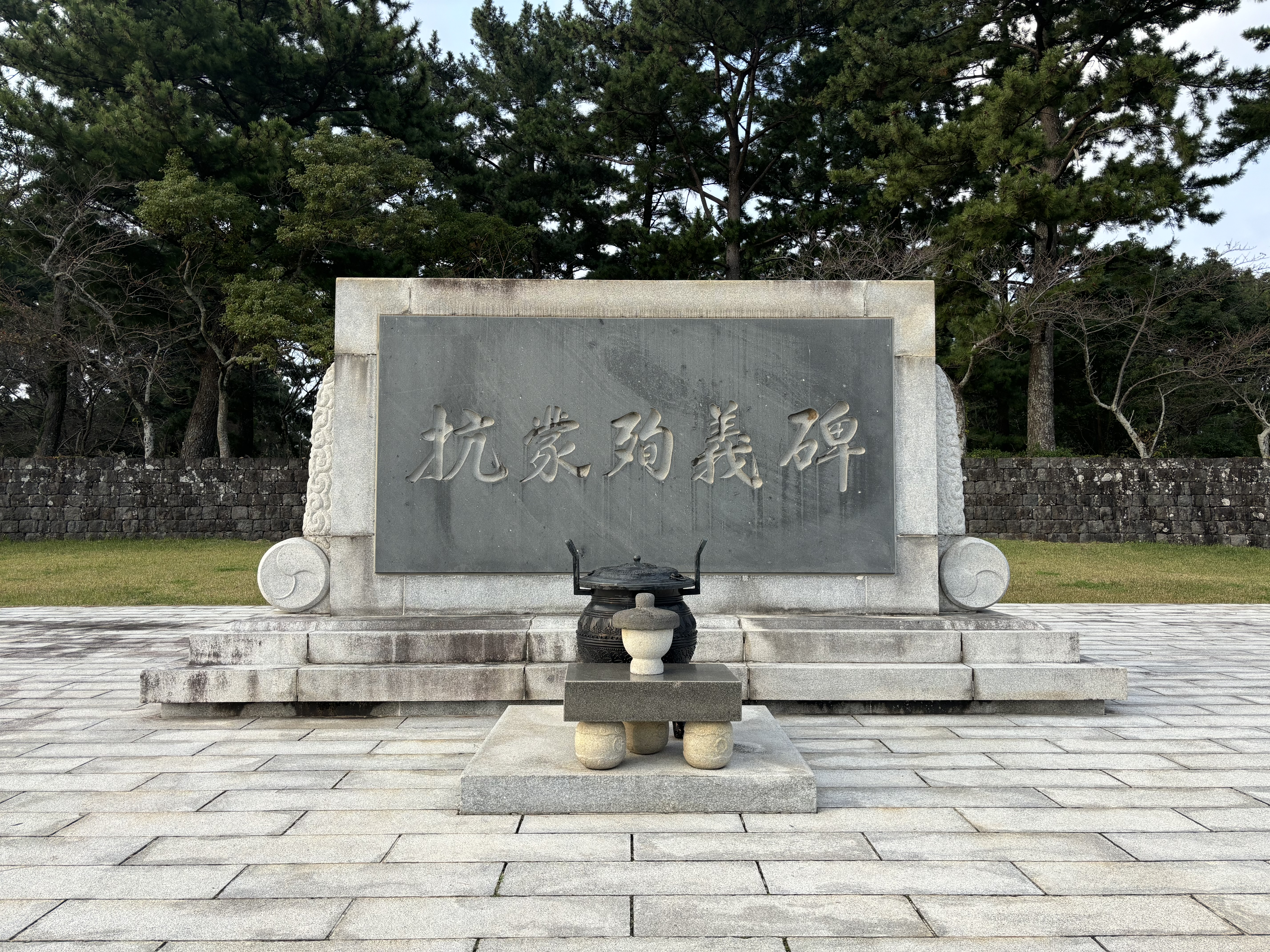
A monument from 1977 with the handwriting of South Korean President Park Chung Hee

The island of Jeju (then known as Tamna) lost its independence to the Goryeo dynasty of the nearby Korean peninsula in the 12th century. In 1231, the Mongol invasions of Korea began, and fighting continued for decades. In February 1270, a peace deal was signed between Goryeo and the Mongol Yuan dynasty. Internal opposition within Goryeo led to the Sambyeolcho Rebellion. Sambyeolcho forces first arrived on Jeju in October 1270 led by Lee Mungyeong, landing at Myeongwol (now in Hallim) and Jocheon before defeating Goryeo forces on November 3. These forces initially based themselves in Jocheon.

The Sambyeolcho were at this time based in Jindo, an island just off the mainland. The security of Jindo was heavily impacted by control of the mainland Yeongsan River, including where it flowed through the area around Naju. Goryeo-Mongol forces were able to use control of the river to harass Jindo. In contrast, Jeju lay 108 kilometres (67 mi) from the mainland, making it a useful potential rear base. That distance was compounded by rough seas for much of the year, and a series of reefs and shallow waters around the island that limited and thus made predictable potential landing locations for invading armies. Jeju further provided a strategic position along sea lanes, and a large enough landmass to support a population on its own. It is possible that Jeju was considered a potential area from which a rebellion could be led from an early stage, competing with Jindo for prominence. Jeju had previously been raised as a potential site to relocate the Goryeo capital, then at Ganghwa Island during the 1260s, before their surrender to the Yuan.

After the Sambyeolcho were defeated on Jindo in 1271, General Kim T'ongjŏng brought all remaining forces to Jeju, which replaced Jindo as the capital for the remaining 31 months of the rebellion. Following this retreat, Hangpadu Fortress was constructed by Kim T'ongjŏng's forces in 1271, serving both administrative and defensive functions. Historical records state that both the inner and outer walls were completed by June 29, 1272. The Hwanhaejangseong coastal walls were also further developed during this time, forming a network of defenses alongside Hangpadu and village fortifications. (The Hwanhaejangseong is sometimes considered as the outer wall of a defensive system including Hangpadu Fortress.) The ability of the Smabyeolcho to construct the fortress within such a short time frame has raised the question of whether Hangpadu Fortress was at least partially built on existing structures, as the Hwanhaejangseong was.

For the Yuan dynasty, Jeju was seen as a strategic location for potential military campaigns against Japan and Song China. In 1273, a combined force of 12,000 Goryeo and Yuan soldiers led by Hong Ta-gu and Kim Panggyŏng landed on the island and attacked the fortress, leading to its surrender in April 1273. Jeju then came under Mongol rule. The Sambyeolcho rebellion and its suppression by Goryeo and Mongol forces was a key historical event strengthening ties between Jeju and the Korean peninsula. Some Sambyeolcho fled to the Ryukyu Islands, possibly bringing their roof tile designs with them. Some buildings within Hangpadu Fortress may have remained in use until the 15th century.

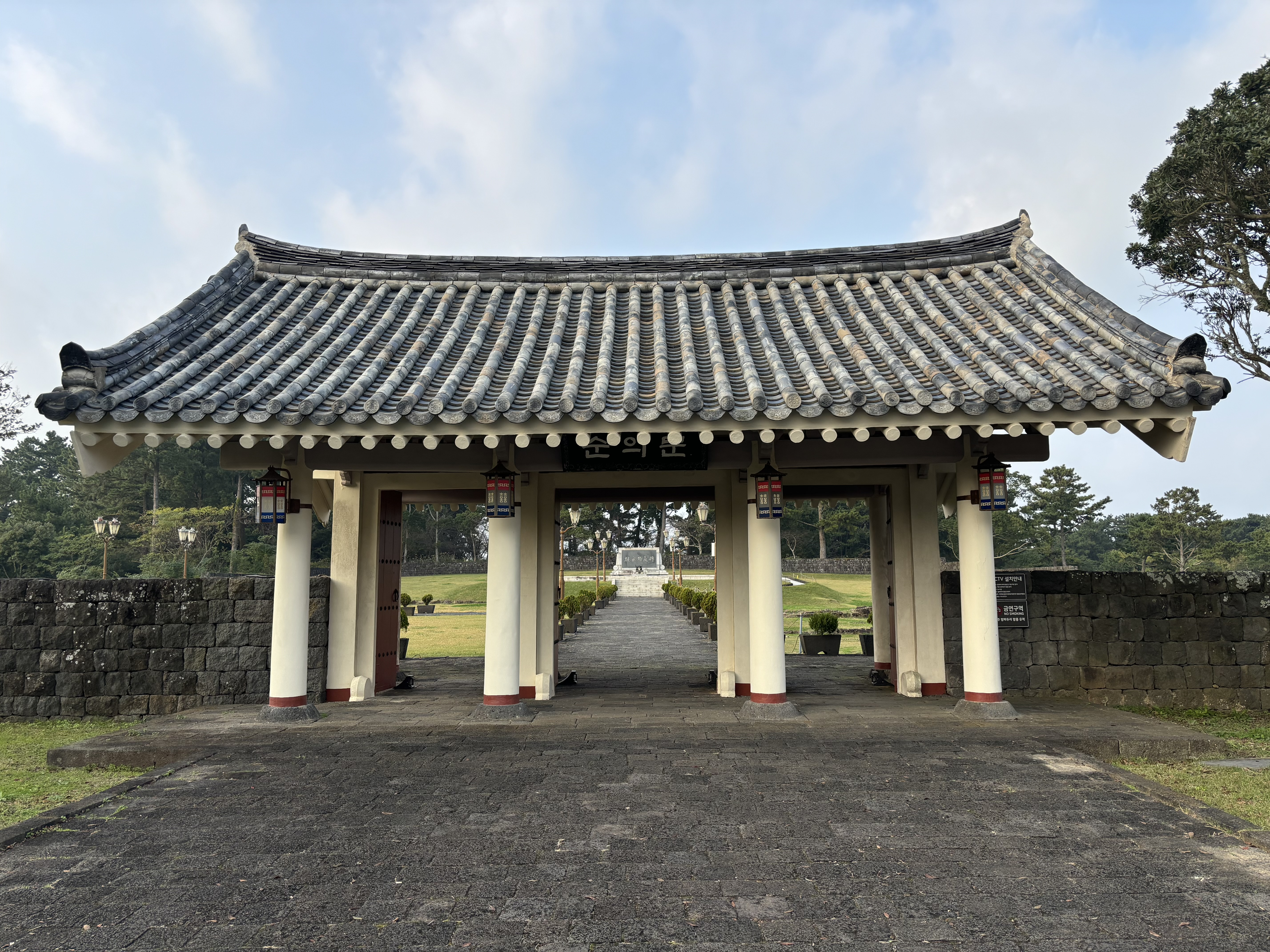
Entrance gate leading to the inner fortress, exhibition hall, and monument from the car park

On September 9, 1976, the remains of the fortress were designated a Jeju historic site. Restoration works costing 745 million South Korean won took place from July 21, 1977 to June 1978, alongside the construction of a monument. This period was when the government, under Park Chung Hee, was seeking historical sites that would provide national pride to help bolster his regime. Due to its association with military resistance, Hangpadu Fortress was considered to have patriotic symbolism. Park visited three times during the restoration. In 1977, a monument was erected at the site, inscribed with "抗蒙殉義碑" in Park's handwriting. Some of the outer wall was reconstructed during this time. These restoration efforts focused on speed rather than research.

An excavation of a small number of areas, including a well, took place in 1993. The first proper survey of the entire site took place from October to December in 1996. Before this, most knowledge came only from historical literature. On April 18, 1997, the site was designated Historic Site No. 396, under the name "제주항파두리항몽유적". Further research commenced after this designation. Kim Yong-sun, an envoy of the North Korean government, visited in September 2000. A second survey was undertaken in 2002, and subsequent excavations took place in 2003, 2004, and 2009.

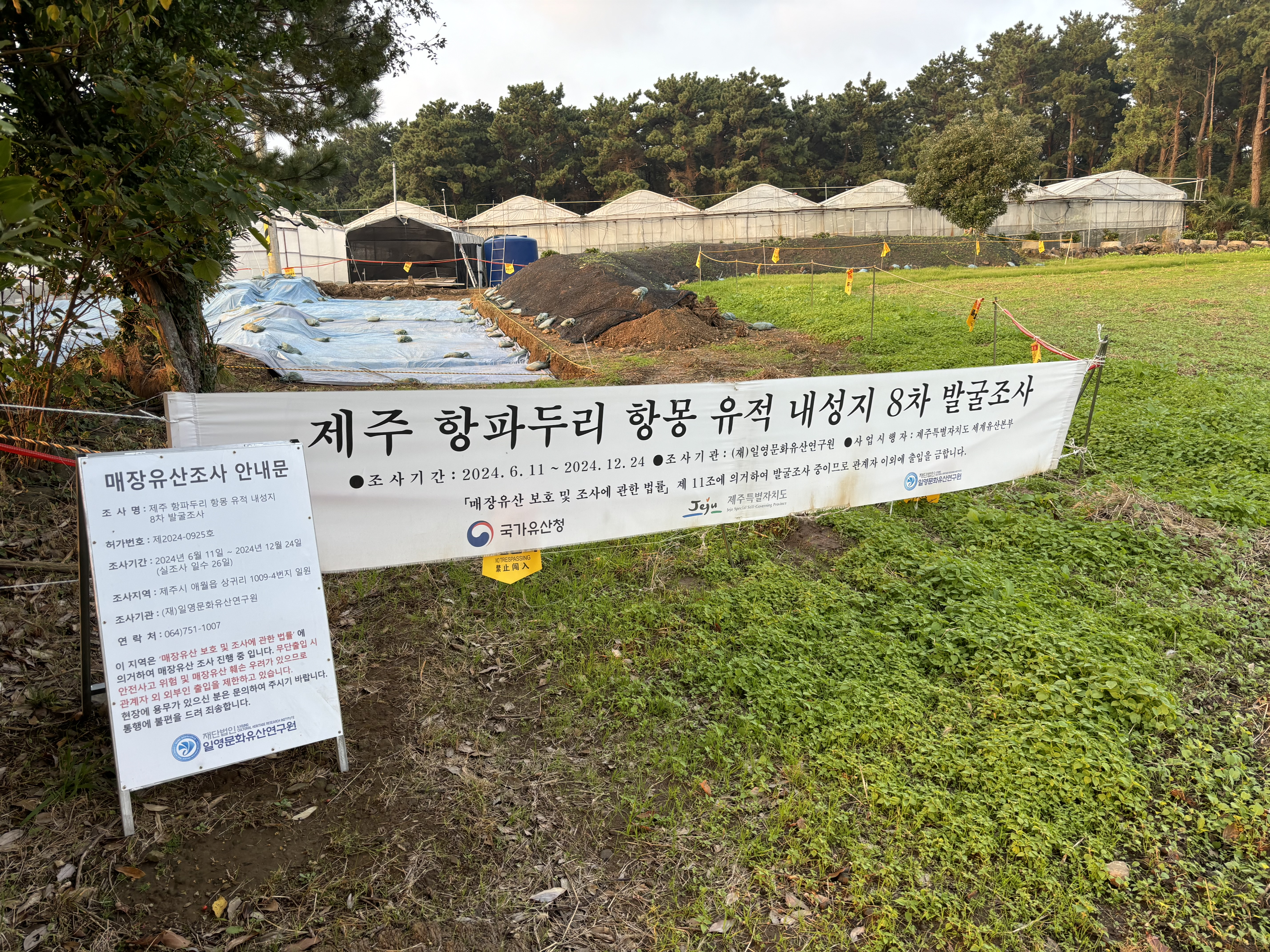
Excavations in 2024

A dedicated research program by the Jeju Archaeological Research Institute began in 2010. The 2010 surveys confirmed that both the inner and outer walls were primarily earthen, rather than stone. A significant excavation of the inner fortress occurred in 2011. This determined that the inner wall was also an earthen wall, with a stone core, rather than being purely stone as was once assumed. Jeju City created a management plan in 2012, which involved investing in research, restoration, and land purchases. As of 2015, there had been nine excavations. These excavations have unearthed a number of items from the period of construction, including tiles and hinges. The eastern gate was excavated in 2021.

It is not known exactly where the name "Hangpaduri" (항파두리) comes from. Historically, it was sometimes also referred to as "Hangbaduri" (항바두리). The theory posits that most likely is that it is an old place-name for the nearby village of Goseongri, perhaps referring to the surrounding terrain. The Hanja for hangpaduseong (항파두성) is "缸坡頭城".

== Management ==
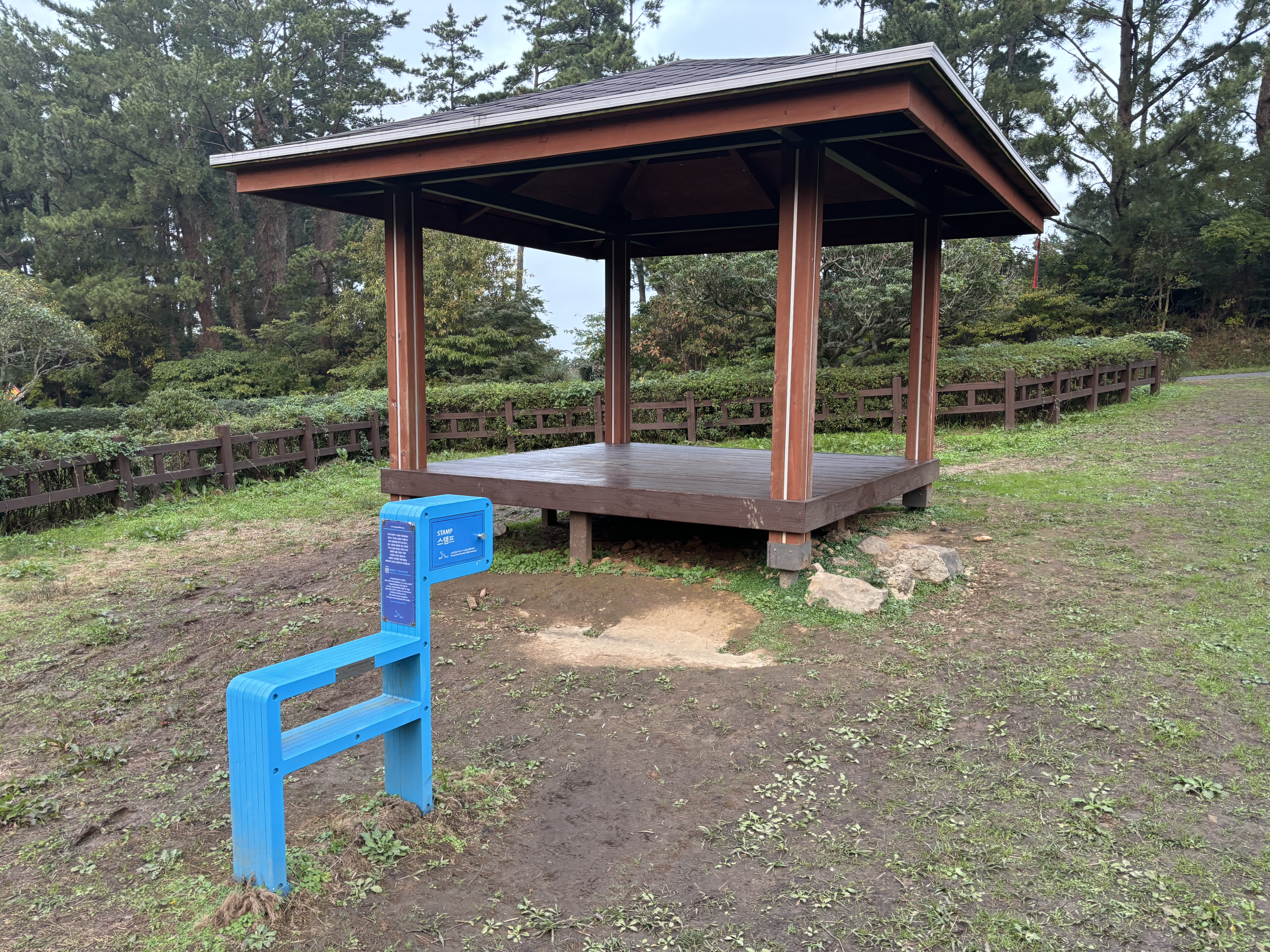
Rest stop for Jeju Olle Trail 16

Today, the site of the former fort includes both public land (national and provincial) and private land. The facility is managed by Jeju City. It is managed to preserve the site, provide access, and maintain views of the outer walls and of the ocean from the walls. The Jeju Archaeological Research Institute has proposed nominating the fortress as a World Heritage Site, perhaps together with Ganghwasanseong Fortress and Yongjangseong Fortress. The events linking the site to China, Korea, and Japan are viewed as giving it importance to East Asian history rather than solely Korean history.

The fortress is the most researched in Jeju, with almost continuous research since the Jeju National University excavation of the south gate in 1993. About 2.3 kilometres (1.4 mi) of the original 3.8 kilometres (2.4 mi) have been restored. Within the fortress ruins, an exhibition hall has been built, helping the site to serve educational purposes. The exhibition hall displays artifacts extracted from the site and paintings illustrating the Sambyelcho Rebellion. Flowers have been planted in some areas of the site, to facilitate recreation. Some cultural events are held at the site, and it is included as part of Jeju Olle Trail 16.

== See also ==
- Sichuan anti-Mongol fortresses
