= Hwanhaejangseong =

Coastal fortress in Jeju, South Korea

Hwanhaejangseong Fortress
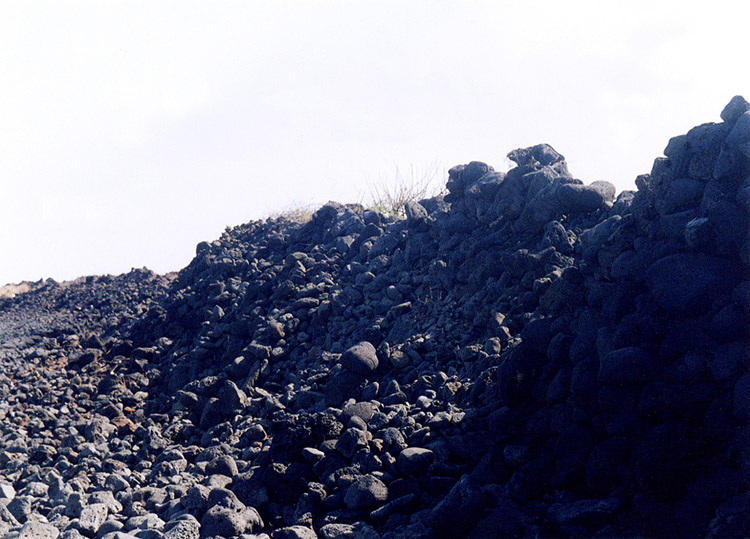
- Part of the wall at Gonneuldong

- Location within South Korea
- 33°25′02″N 126°54′25″E
- Type: Coastal wall

History
- Built: 1270 onwards

Site notes
- Length: 5,120 metres (16,800 ft)

Korean name
- Hangul: 환해장성
- Hanja: 環海長城
- RR: Hwanhaejangseong
- MR: Hwanhaejangsŏng

Hwanhaejangseong Fortress (Korean: 환해장성; Hanja: 環海長城), sometimes translated as the Hwanhaejangseong Fortress or the Hwanhae Great Wall, is a coastal fortification that once extended across much of the coastline of Jeju Island, today part of South Korea. Constructed in the 1270s during the Sambyeolcho Rebellion, the wall remained in use for centuries. However, in the late 20th-century it was heavily damaged, especially during the development of the island's coastal roads. In 1998, ten remaining stretches totaling 5,120 metres (16,800 ft) were designated a Monument of Jeju Province.

In 1270, during the Sambyeolcho Rebellion, the Goryeo government sent instructions for a wall to be built on Jeju to help prevent Sambyeolcho forces from taking the island. However, the Sambyeolcho attacked just two months after Goryeo forces arrived, taking the island. It is likely the Sambyeolcho continued to develop and extend the wall, before their eventual defeat in 1273. The wall remained in use, being seen as helpful in defence against Japanese pirates. In 1845, the walls were repaired and perhaps extended after a British ship spent a month near the island. The current walls are likely a result of this 1845 reconstruction.

The walls were built with local basalt, and the construction seems to have used traditional local techniques used to build other stone walls in Jeju. However, the precise form of the wall varied along its length. Attempts to repair and reconstruct the wall have faced challenges due to a lack of knowledge about initial construction techniques.

== History ==
The construction of what became Hwanhaejangseong began during the Sambyeolcho Rebellion. Forces representing the Goryeo government were sent to the island of Jeju to prevent its takeover by Sambyeolcho forces, who had recently conquered the island of Jindo. Part of their instruction was to construct coastal defences, and the first walls were built from Hwabuk (now in Jeju City) east through Jocheon to Hamdeok. This construction is mentioned in the Koryŏsa chŏryo and the Sinjŭng Tongguk yŏji sŭngnam. Both record that the wall was built by defenders sent by Goryeo to repel a Sambyeolcho attack. These defenders were led by General Go Yeorim (Korean: 고여림; Hanja: 高汝霖), who had previously been involved in attacks on Sambyeolcho forces on Jindo. The Sinjŭng Tongguk yŏji sŭngnam records that 1,000 soldiers sent to Jeju specifically to construct coastal defences (referred to as gojangseong (Korean: 고장성; Hanja: 古長城)) of 300 li. This is also attested in other historical documents, although none give specific dates of construction. The reported number of soldiers may actually include up to 730 individuals who were native to Jeju, rather than all 1,000 having been sent from the mainland. The Goryeosa reports that two groups of soldiers were sent to Jeju, one of around 200 men and one of around 70.

Goryeo forces arrived in Jeju around mid-September 1270. While historical documents suggest these forces built Hwanhaejangseong, given that the Sambyeolcho conquered Jeju in mid-November, it is unlikely that the whole fortress was constructed by the Goryeo forces. Instead, the Sambyeolcho forces likely extended whatever was constructed during this two-month time frame. The Sambyeolcho landed at Myeongwol (now in Hallim) and Jocheon before defeating government forces. Following this they likely began constructing the coastal walls from Myeongwol eastwards to Gonae (now in Aewol). Sambyeolcho forces likely continued building from December 1270 to May 1273, expanding the wall to cover six important ports. During this time they also undertook other construction, building Hangpadu fortress and other structures in the Aewol area, as well as improving ports and roads. The Sambyeolcho may have received more cooperation from residents of the island, although both the Goryeo government and the Sambyeolcho were likely seen as outsiders. It has been suggested that perhaps 6,000 civilians were needed to assist the soldiers for construction each day.

Hwanhaejangseong formed part of a wider defensive structure also incorporating Hangpadu Fortress, replicating the multi-layered defensive systems established on Ganghwa Island. There are no records of the original height, width, or shape of the wall, with the records only stating that the wall reached 300 li. A length of 300 li would have covered much of the 200 li by 120 li island. It is unclear how much of that length was built by the initial Goryeo forces, how much by the Sambyeolcho, and how much may even have been constructed after that. If the records are correct, it stretched around half the island. The walls were maintained and perhaps further expanded during the Joseon period, when they were thought still useful against foreign ships such as Japanese pirates. Pirate presence was common from the 13th to 16th centuries, during which there were over 30 pirate invasions.

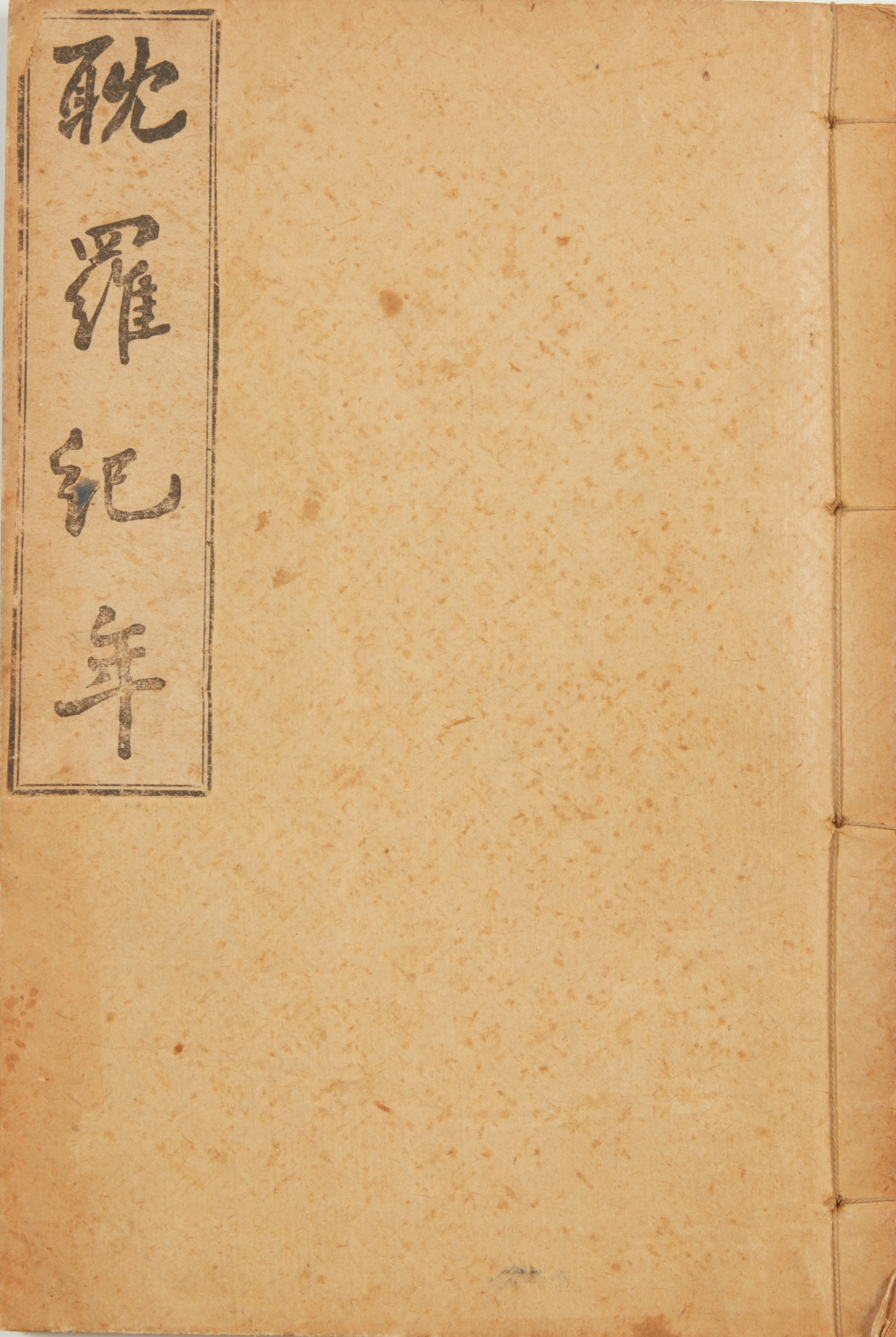
The 1918 Tamna Ginyun introduced the name "Hwanhaejangseong"

The Tamna Ginyun records that the walls were repaired in 1845 on the order of Jeju's governor at that time. This was triggered by the appearance of a "strange ship" off the coast. This ship, the British HMS Samarang, surveyed the area near Udo for 40 days. It is likely that the remaining walls are parts that were restored five months after the ship departed, a period that likely saw the construction of completely new sections on Udo.

Coastal walls had been built prior to these on Ganghwa Island. It is possible that in turn Hwanhaejangseong inspired the construction of Genkō Bōrui in Kyushu, Japan. The Mongols invaded Japan the year after the fall of Jeju, and the Genkō Bōrui was built following this to repel any further naval Mongol invasions.

The wall was mostly destroyed in the late 20th century, especially during the construction of coastal roads. The island's coastal ring road was paved in the 1970s, and other coastal roads were built in the 1990s. After much of this damage had been done, the wall was designated a Monument of Jeju Province No. 49 on January 7, 1998. It was redesignated on November 19, 2021, as part of a new unnumbered list. Restoration efforts began in 2001.

Historical names for the wall include jangseong (Korean: 장성; Hanja: 長城), seongdam (Korean: 성담), and seokseong (Korean: 석성; Hanja: 石城). In the Sinjŭng Tongguk yŏji sŭngnam it is referred to as the gojangseong (Korean: 고장성; Hanja: 古長城). There are also historical references to it as the "Great Wall of Tamna" (탐라의 만리장성), referencing the Great Wall of China. The name "Hwanhaejangseong" was first used in the 1918 Tamna Ginyun, and became common following this use.

== Construction ==
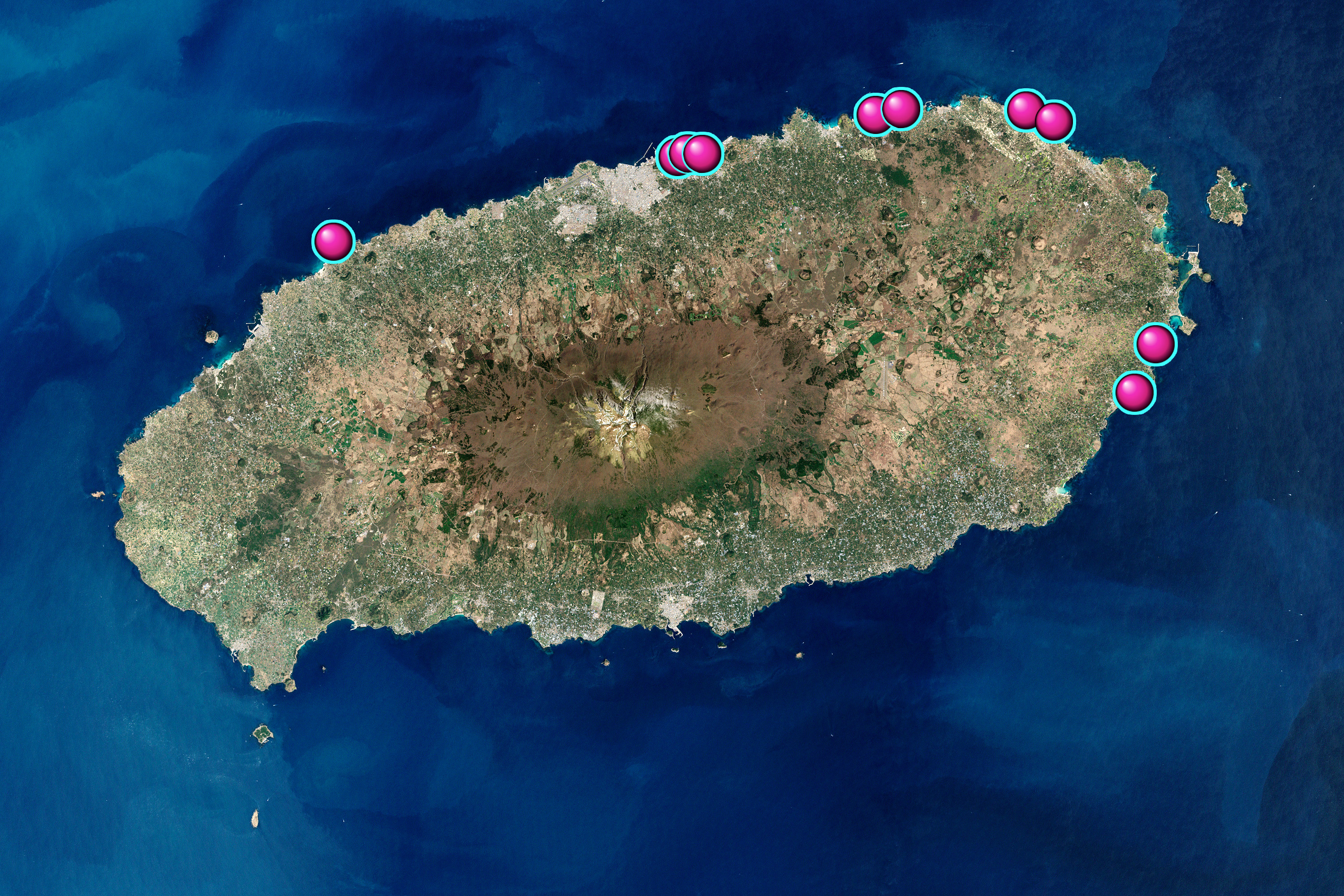
Locations of protected areas of remaining wall

The walls were constructed using local basalt. This likely indicates the extensive involvement of local craftsmen, as they would be more familiar with basalt construction, despite historical records noting locals were not always cooperative. Construction techniques also likely varied throughout the island due to differences in terrain. Local input is further evidenced by the wall's similarity to the batdam walls constructed in agricultural areas to separate Jeju's houses and fields, techniques also similar to the Tamna-era walls at Geumseong. This differed from techniques used to build walls around Jindo's Yongjangseong fortress. Nonetheless, the treatment of the wall as an outer wall of the Hangpadu fortress imitates the structure of the historical Kaesong city walls and Ganghwasanseong Fortress.

The total length may have reached 120 kilometres (75 mi). The width averaged around 2 metres (6.6 ft), with a height of around 3 metres (9.8 ft). The wall reaches 4 metres (13 ft) wide at points, and in some areas there are multiple layers. This double wall design, with the seaward-facing wall being higher, is different from the standard Jeju stone wall construction. The shape and slope of the wall varies. This variation may stem both from the use of local stones, and from differing local topographies. Some areas were built with gaps for shooting bows or firearms.

The likely variation in initial construction, along with known rebuilding efforts later, especially during the Joseon dynasty, makes it difficult to establish what portions and building techniques might be from the initial construction. Repairs may have continued until 1854. In some areas, it can be difficult to determine what was the Hwanhaejangseong and what was another form of piled rock boundary wall. There is a dispute about the authenticity of part of the Gonneuldong section.

== Impacts ==
The wall was intended to make coastal landings more difficult, as well as providing the defenders opportunities to ambush landing craft. The decision to build a coastal wall, as opposed to relying on individual fortresses around settlements, was possibly due to the flat land around these settlements making them hard to defend. Alternatively, the wall may have been built to complement the individual village defenses.

The presence of the wall reduced the intrusion of salt brought by wind from the ocean onto coastal farms. Some of the remaining stretches of the wall lie along the Jeju Olle Trail, which has kept it in public awareness.

== Remaining structures ==
Designated portions of Hwanhaejangseong
Location	Monument No.	Length	Address
Gonneuldong (in Hwabuk-dong, Jeju City)	No. 49-1	140 metres (460 ft)	4373 Hwabuk 1(il)-dong, Jeju City, plus 4 other lots
Byeoldo (in Hwabuk-dong, Jeju City)	No. 49-2	620 metres (2,030 ft)	1533-4 Hwabuk 1(il)-dong, Jeju City, plus 11 other sites
Samyang (Samyang-dong, Jeju City)	No. 49-3	280 metres (920 ft)	2622-1 Samyang 3(sam)-dong, Jeju City, plus 8 other lots
Aewol	No. 49-4	360 metres (1,180 ft)	1957-1 Aewol-ri, Aewol-eup, Jeju City, plus 8 other lots
Bukchon (in Jocheon)	No. 49-5	250 metres (820 ft)	393-3 Bukchon-ri, Jocheon-eup, Jeju City, plus 1 other lots
Dongbok (in Gujwa)	No. 49-6	150 metres (490 ft)	687-5 Dongbok-ri, Gujwa-eup, Jeju City, plus two other lots
Haengwon (in Gujwa)	No. 49-7	310 metres (1,020 ft)	Lot San 2, Haengwon-ri, Gujwa-eup, Jeju City, and other lots
Handong (in Gujwa)	No. 49-8	290 metres (950 ft)	1690 Handong-ri, Gujwa-eup, Jeju City, plus 4 other lots
Onpyeong (in Seongsan)	No. 49-9	2,120 metres (6,960 ft)	732 Hwanhaejangseong-ro, Seongsan-eup, Jeju City, plus 6 other lots
Sinsan (in Seongsan)	No. 49-10	600 metres (2,000 ft)	49-5 Sinsan-ri, Seongsan-eup, Jeju City

There are at least 14 areas, possibly 19 or 28, where parts of the wall remain. Of these, 5,120 metres (16,800 ft) was designated Monument of Jeju Province number 49. This is divided into 10 separately designated stretches, each managed with their own regulations. The longest is the Onpyeong portion, at 2,120 metres (6,960 ft), although this can also be divided into four smaller sections. Other remains exist outside of the officially designated areas.

The wall has been damaged by activities including construction, fish farming, and tourists building rock towers. This is similar to other stone defensive structures in Jeju, which often lack protection. The designated areas are better cared for than other remnants. However, even these have been damaged by typhoons and other storms. Restoration is hampered by a lack of detailed knowledge of the original construction techniques, and some reconstruction efforts have been criticized as not reflecting the original design. In at least one site, the alignment of the restored wall was different to the original position.

== Gallery ==
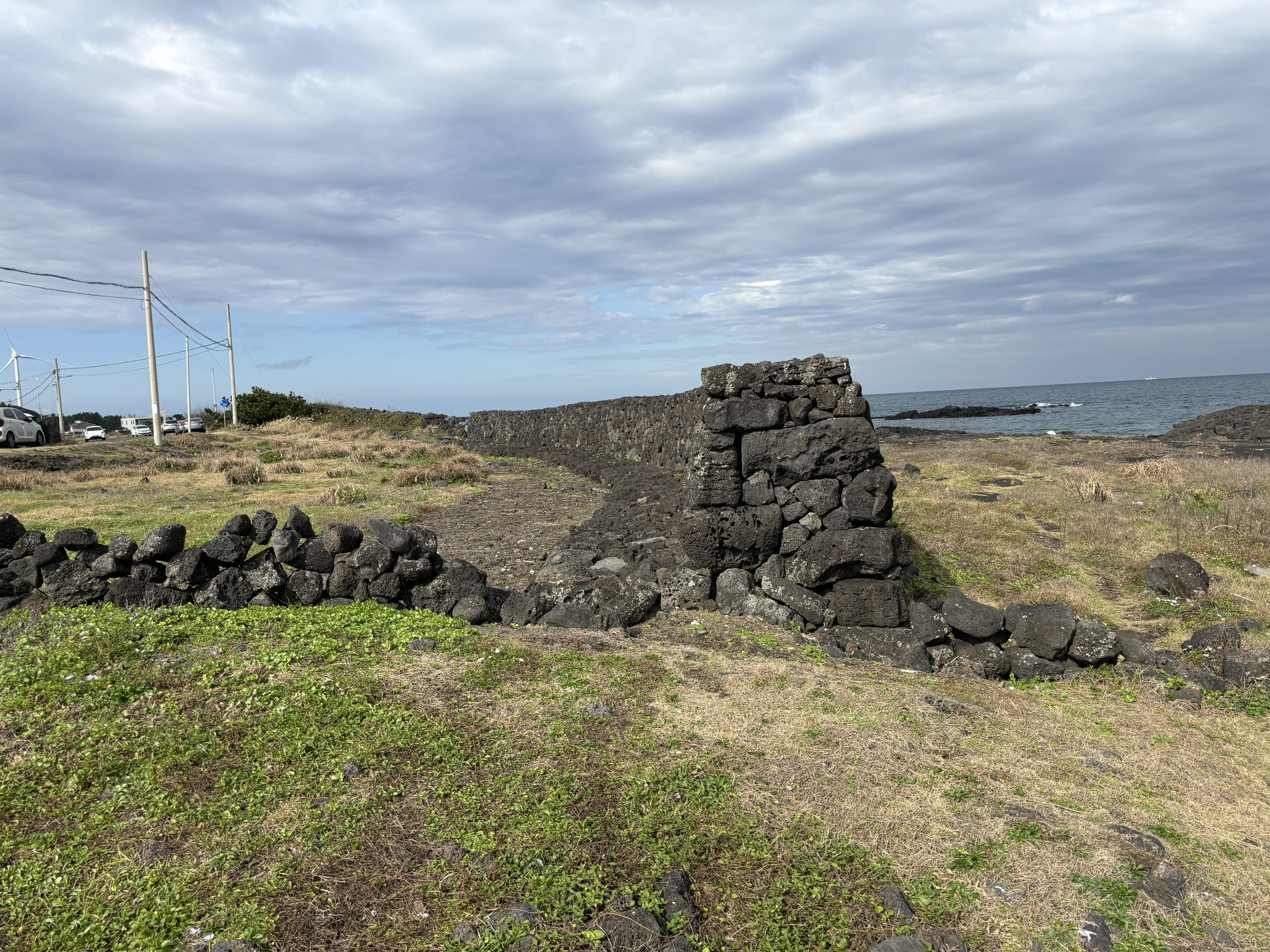
Handong section

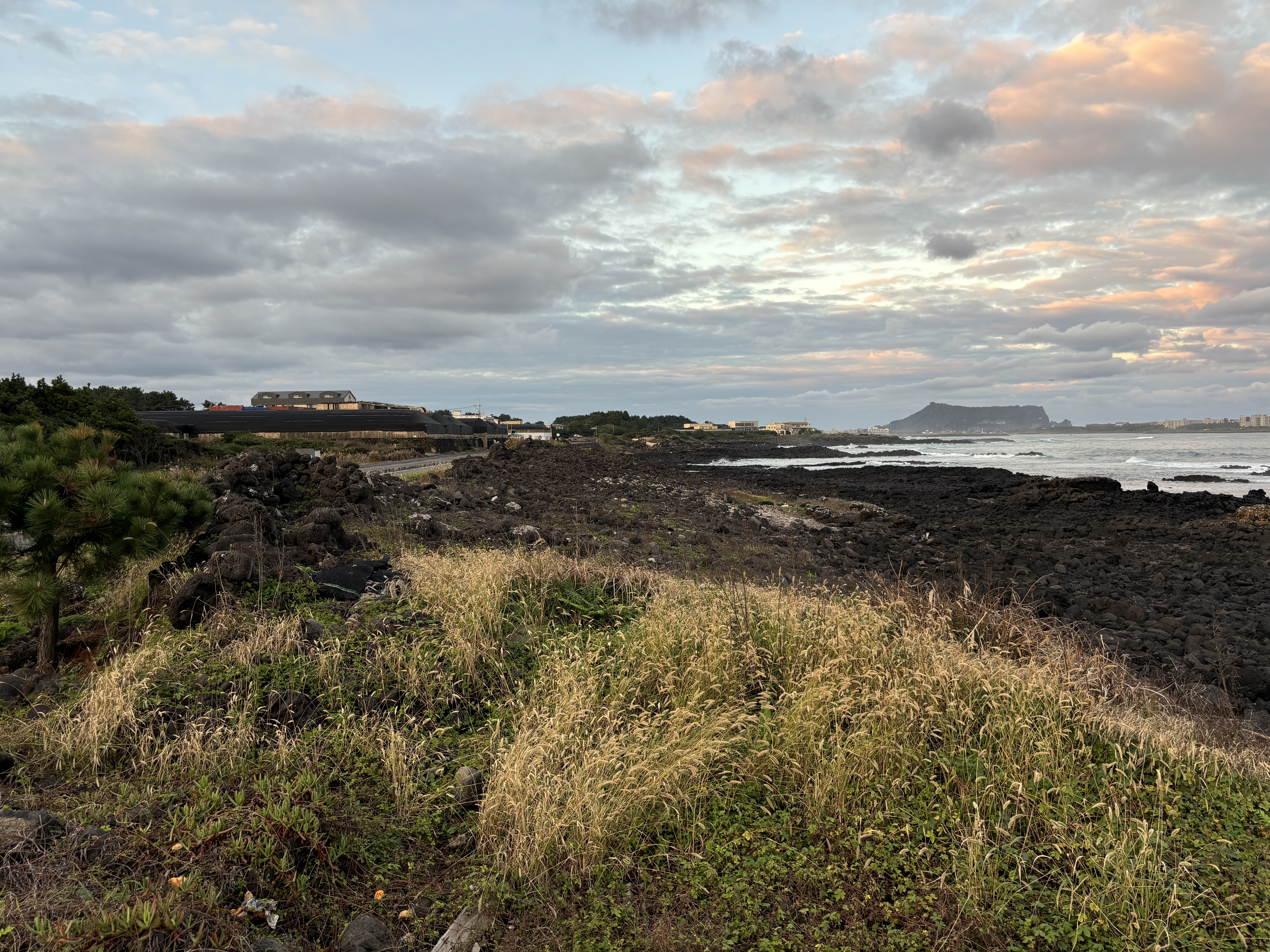
Onpyeong section
