= List of cities of Jeju Province =

Jeju Province is divided into 2 administrative cities (haengjeong-si) and further into 7 towns (eup), 5 townships (myeon), and 31 administrative neighborhoods (haengjeong-dong). Listed below is each entity's name in English, hangul and hanja.

Cities/Counties	Towns/Townships/Administrative Neighborhoods
Cities/Counties	Name	Hangul	Hanja
Jeju-si 제주시 濟州市	Aewol-eup	애월읍	涯月邑
Jeju-si 제주시 濟州市	Jocheon-eup	조천읍	朝天邑
Jeju-si 제주시 濟州市	Hallim-eup	한림읍	翰林邑
Jeju-si 제주시 濟州市	Gujwa-eup	구좌읍	舊左邑
Jeju-si 제주시 濟州市	Hangyeong-myeon	한경면	翰京面
Jeju-si 제주시 濟州市	Chuja-myeon	추자면	楸子面
Jeju-si 제주시 濟州市	Udo-myeon	우도면	牛島面
Jeju-si 제주시 濟州市	Geonip-dong	건입동	健入洞
Jeju-si 제주시 濟州市	Nohyeong-dong	노형동	老衡洞
Jeju-si 제주시 濟州市	Dodu-dong	도두동	道頭洞
Jeju-si 제주시 濟州市	Bonggae-dong	봉개동	奉蓋洞
Jeju-si 제주시 濟州市	Samdo-1-dong	삼도1동	三徒1洞
Jeju-si 제주시 濟州市	Samdo-2-dong	삼도2동	三徒2洞
Jeju-si 제주시 濟州市	Samyang-dong	삼양동	三陽洞
Jeju-si 제주시 濟州市	Ara-dong	아라동	我羅洞
Jeju-si 제주시 濟州市	Yeon-dong	연동	連洞
Jeju-si 제주시 濟州市	Ora-dong	오라동	吾羅洞
Jeju-si 제주시 濟州市	Oedo-dong	외도동	外都洞
Jeju-si 제주시 濟州市	Yongdam-1-dong	용담1동	龍潭1洞
Jeju-si 제주시 濟州市	Yongdam-2-dong	용담2동	龍潭2洞
Jeju-si 제주시 濟州市	Ido-1-dong	이도1동	二徒1洞
Jeju-si 제주시 濟州市	Ido-2-dong	이도2동	二徒2洞
Jeju-si 제주시 濟州市	Iho-dong	이호동	梨湖洞
Jeju-si 제주시 濟州市	Ildo-1-dong	일도1동	一徒1洞
Jeju-si 제주시 濟州市	Ildo-2-dong	일도2동	一徒2洞
Jeju-si 제주시 濟州市	Hwabuk-dong	화북동	禾北洞
Seogwipo-si 서귀포시 西歸浦市	Namwon-eup	남원읍	南元邑
Seogwipo-si 서귀포시 西歸浦市	Daejeong-eup	대정읍	大靜邑
Seogwipo-si 서귀포시 西歸浦市	Seongsan-eup	성산읍	城山邑
Seogwipo-si 서귀포시 西歸浦市	Andeok-myeon	안덕면	安德面
Seogwipo-si 서귀포시 西歸浦市	Pyoseon-myeon	표선면	表善面
Seogwipo-si 서귀포시 西歸浦市	Daeryun-dong	대륜동	大倫洞
Seogwipo-si 서귀포시 西歸浦市	Daecheon-dong	대천동	大川洞
Seogwipo-si 서귀포시 西歸浦市	Donghong-dong	동홍동	東烘洞
Seogwipo-si 서귀포시 西歸浦市	Seohong-dong	서홍동	西烘洞
Seogwipo-si 서귀포시 西歸浦市	Songsan-dong	송산동	松山洞
Seogwipo-si 서귀포시 西歸浦市	Yeongcheon-dong	영천동	靈泉洞
Seogwipo-si 서귀포시 西歸浦市	Yerae-dong	예래동	猊來洞
Seogwipo-si 서귀포시 西歸浦市	Jeongbang-dong	정방동	正房洞
Seogwipo-si 서귀포시 西歸浦市	Jungmun-dong	중문동	中文洞
Seogwipo-si 서귀포시 西歸浦市	Jungang-dong	중앙동	中央洞
Seogwipo-si 서귀포시 西歸浦市	Cheonji-dong	천지동	天地洞
Seogwipo-si 서귀포시 西歸浦市	Hyodon-dong	효돈동	孝敦洞

== See also ==
- List of cities in South Korea
