= Imajuku =

Imajuku may refer to:

- Asami Imajuku (今宿 麻美) (born 1978), Japanese model, actress and singer
- Imajuku Station (今宿駅), a railway station in Fukuoka Prefecture, Japan
