= Ganghwasanseong Fortress =

Fortress in Ganghwa, South Korea

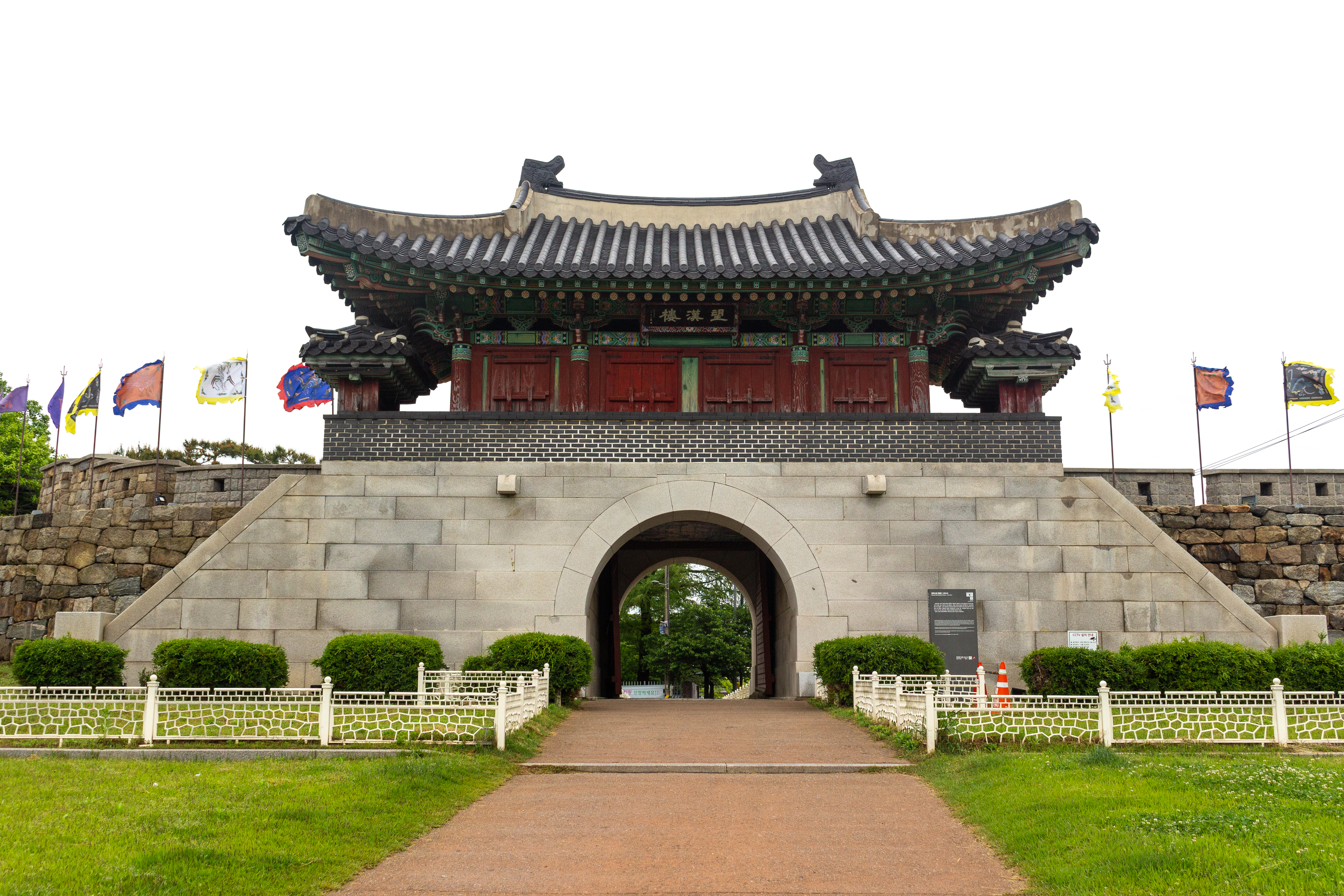
- The eastern gate

- Location within South Korea
- 37°45′20″N 126°28′37″E
- Type: Fortress
- Location: San 3, Gukhwa-ri, Ganghwa-gun, Incheon

History
- Built: 1232
- Built for: Goryeo dynasty

Site notes
- Area: 789,204 square metres (8,494,920 sq ft)

Historic Sites of South Korea
- Official name: Ganghwasanseong Fortress
- Designated: June 10, 1964

Korean name
- Hangul: 강화산성
- Hanja: 江華山城
- RR: Ganghwasanseong
- MR: Kanghwasansŏng

Ganghwasanseong Fortress (Korean: 강화산성; Hanja: 江華山城) was a fortress on Ganghwa Island, Incheon, South Korea. The fortress was first constructed in 1232 to serve as the capital of the Goryeo kingdom, during the Mongol invasions of Korea when the Goryeo court was relocated from Kaesong to Ganghwa Island. Although it was destroyed as part of a peace deal with the Mongols, parts were later rebuilt and continued to serve a defensive purpose until the 20th century.

The original structure consisted of three concentric rammed earth walls, reflecting the design of the Kaesong city walls. The inner wall surrounded the palace site, and the outer wall extended down Ganghwa Island's eastern coastline. This system was intended to prevent invasions from the mainland. The inner and outer walls were rebuilt during the Joseon period, however the middle wall was never rebuilt. Both walls were eventually reconstructed in stone.

The strategic location of the fortress, protecting the mouth of the Han River, meant it remained an important military site. It was damaged during the 1866 French expedition to Korea and the 1871 United States expedition to Korea. The Japan–Korea Treaty of 1876 was signed at the site. The inner fortress was designated a Historic Site in 1964, and has seen significant restoration work since. The outer walls were designated a separate Historic Site in 2003.

== History ==
During the Mongol invasions of Korea, the Goryeo court moved to Ganghwa Island in 1232. This decision was made by Ch'oe U, a military leader who controlled the government during the reign of King Gojong of Goryeo. The population of the former capital, Kaesong, was around 100,000 at that time, and significant development was needed on Ganghwa to accommodate all those moving to the relatively safe island.

Construction of the new capital was likely supervised by the Jangjakgam. Around 2,000 soldiers are recorded to have been involved in the construction of the complex. The builders may also have included civilians. Artisans from the capital were likely involved in producing giwa (roof tiles) at the site. Construction accelerated in January 1234.

The fortress was a multi-layered system with inner, middle, and outer walls, designed to resist potential Mongol coastal invasions. These defensive walls protected the palace complex. The outer wall was likely constructed first, followed by the middle wall. All of the walls were demolished as part of the peace deal after the Koreans surrender to the Mongols and the capital moved back to the mainland.

The Sambyeolcho Rebellion started on Ganghwa in June 1270. The outer walls of the Ganghwa fortress may have inspired the construction of the Hwanhaejangseong walls around Jeju Island by the Sambyeolcho. Either or both of these may have then inspired the Genkō Bōrui in Kyushu, Japan.

The Joseon dynasty rebuilt the inner fortress, although it was destroyed again during the 1636–1637 Qing invasion of Joseon. It was again rebuilt, and slightly enlarged, during the rule of Sukjong of Joseon. The outer wall was repaired in 1618 during the rule of King Gwanghaegun, but was also destroyed during the Qing invasion. The outer wall was also rebuilt using stone under Sukjong, with new fortifications being constructed along it. Fortifications built along the coast during the late 17th century include the Ganghwa Dondae Fortresses. These were sometimes built upon former structures. Erosion during rain led to the outer wall being reconstructed in 1743 on the initiative of a local governor, who obtained permission from King Yeongjo.

The fortress was damaged again in 1866 during the French expedition to Korea. An extension of the Joseon Kyujanggak library (referred to as the Oegyujanggak) was mostly destroyed during the French invasion. Copies of the Uigwe were taken from this library to France, although they have been returned to South Korea on a permanent loan.

The island also saw military action during the 1871 United States expedition to Korea. The fortress was the location of the signing of the Japan–Korea Treaty of 1876. Ganghwa Island served as a military fort protecting the Han River until the 20th century.

The inner fortress was designated as the Ganghwasanseong Fortress (강화산성; 江華山城) Historic Site on 10 June 1964. Extensive restoration took place after 1977. The outer wall was separately designated as its own Historic Site (강화외성; 江華外城) on October 25, 2003.

== Design ==
The layout of the Ganghwasanseong resembled the previous capital, suggesting it was intended to provide governance as well as serve military purposes. The triple wall structure also reflected the Kaesong city walls around the old capital. Later fortresses constructed by the Sambyeolcho also had similar designs, however Ganghwasanseong was geographically quite close to the former capital, and was likely seen in a different context.

The initial fortifications were all made of earth. The construction of the walls appears to have varied by terrain. Some techniques, such as filling a gap between two rows of stones with rubble, were later used by the Sambyeolcho in Jeju. Other commonalities between the sites include the positioning of timber within the walls and the addition of an interior waterway.

=== Inner fortress ===
The inner fortress now sometimes referred to by itself as Ganghwasanseong Fortress (강화산성; 江華山城). It is also referred to as the Ganghwaeupseong Walled Town. It was designed to be similar to Manwŏltae, the palace complex in Kaesong. While the palace building was overall smaller than the Kaesong complex, it had rooms with similar functions.

The inner wall was 1,200 metres (3,900 ft) long. It had four main gates, as well as four hidden gates and two water gates. The four main gates were referred to as the Anparu (the southern gate), Cheomhwaru (the eastern gate), Manghanru (the western gate), and Jinsongru (the northern gate). The south gate collapsed in 1955, but was restored in 1975. The current eastern gate was built in 2011.

The Yeonmudang pavilion near the west gate, once a military training area, was where the Japan–Korea Treaty of 1876 was signed. This treaty is now viewed in Korea as an unequal treaty favoring Japan, and a memorial has been established at the site. The area between the eastern and southern gates is now covered by parts of the main Ganghwa town. There was originally three watchtowers: Namjangdae (남장대), Bukjangdae (북장대), and Seojangdae (서장대). While none survived, Namjangdae was rebuilt in 2010. The currently protected site covers 789,204 square metres (8,494,920 sq ft).

=== Middle wall ===
The middle earthen wall stretched around the inner palace. It had eight gates and protected the inner fortress from the eastern coast. Relatively little evidence of the wall remains. However, what does remain preserves the original Goryeo rammed earth construction, unlike other areas which were rebuilt at later times. Remains of 11.39 kilometres (7.08 mi) of wall have been found in a "C" shape. It is thought to have had 17 gates of various sizes.

To construct the wall, bedrock was flattened if necessary, and then covered by a layer of clay. A layer of stones was placed upon this, including foundation stones placed about 4 metres (13 ft) apart on top of which pillars were built. These pillars were connected by wooden planks about 20 centimetres (7.9 in) wide, forming a frame of about 4 by 4.5 metres (13 ft × 15 ft). Earth was used to construct the rest of the wall, sometimes topped by tiles.

=== Outer wall ===
The strategic location of the outer wall saw further fortresses built along it over time

The outer wall (외성; 外城) was originally built from 1233 to 1237. Its completion is recorded in the Goryeosa. It stretched 23 kilometres (14 mi) along the island's eastern coast. There are few archaeological remains of the original Goryeo walls. However, what has been found in excavations has provided information on historical fort construction techniques.

The final wall was around 6 metres (20 ft) high and 1.5 metres (4.9 ft) wide, made of large stones topped by stone bricks. The Chojijin Fortress lies on one end of the 23 kilometres (14 mi) length. The wall could be passed through via six main gates, six secret gates, and further had 17 sluice gates. The area of land designated as a Historic Site is 255,544.9 square metres (2,750,662 sq ft).

== See also ==
- Gochang, Hwasun and Ganghwa Dolmen Sites
