= Shimoyamato Station =

Railway station in Fukuoka, Japan

JK 02 Shimoyamato Station 下山門駅
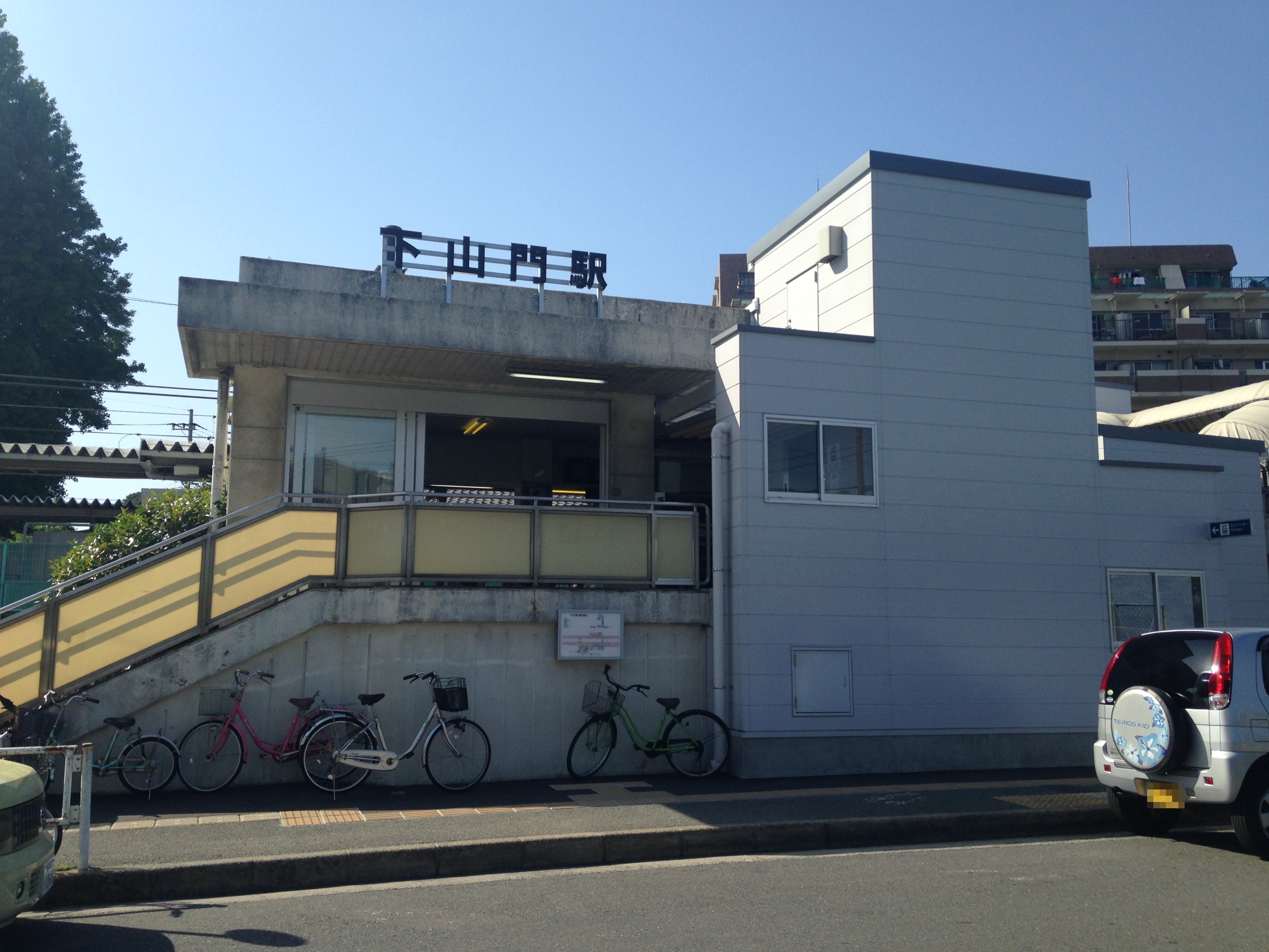
- Shimoyamato Station in May 2015

General information
- Location: 4-chōme-2 Shimoyamato, Nishi-ku, Fukuoka-shi, Fukuoka-ken, 819-0052; Japan
- Coordinates: 33°34′55″N 130°18′29″E
- Operator: JR Kyushu
- Line: Chikuhi Line
- Distance: 1.6 km (0.99 mi) from Meinohama
- Platforms: 2 side platforms
- Tracks: 2

Construction
- Structure type: At grade
- Accessible: Yes - platforms linked by footbridge with elevators

Other information
- Status: Staffed ticket window (Midori no Madoguchi) (outsourced)
- Station code: JK02
- Website: Official website

History
- Opened: 20 July 1986; 40 years ago
- Rebuilt: 13 March 2010; 16 years ago

Passengers
- FY2020: 2388 daily
- Rank: 62nd (among JR Kyushu stations)

Services
Preceding station	JR Kyushu	Following station
Imajuku towards Nishi-Karatsu	Chikuhi Line Local	Meinohama Terminus
Location
- Location within Fukuoka Prefecture Location within Japan

Shimoyamato Station (下山門駅) is a passenger railway station located in Nishi-ku, Fukuoka, Japan. It is operated by JR Kyushu.

== Lines ==
The station is served by the Chikuhi Line and is located 1.6 km from the starting point of the line at Meinohama. Local and weekday rapid services on the Chikuhi Line stop at this station.

== Station layout ==
The station consists of two side platforms serving two tracks. The station building is a modern concrete structure and houses a small waiting area with a staffed ticket window. Access to the opposite side platform is by means of a raised footbridge, with a pair of elevators as alternative ways up and down the bridge.

Management of the station has been outsourced to the JR Kyushu Tetsudou Eigyou Co., a wholly owned subsidiary of JR Kyushu specialising in station services. It staffs the ticket counter which is equipped with a Midori no Madoguchi facility.

=== Platforms ===
1	■ JK Chikuhi Line	for Chikuzen-Maebaru, Chikuzen-Fukae and Karatsu
2	■ JK Chikuhi Line	for Meinohama, Tenjin, Hakata and Fukuoka Airport

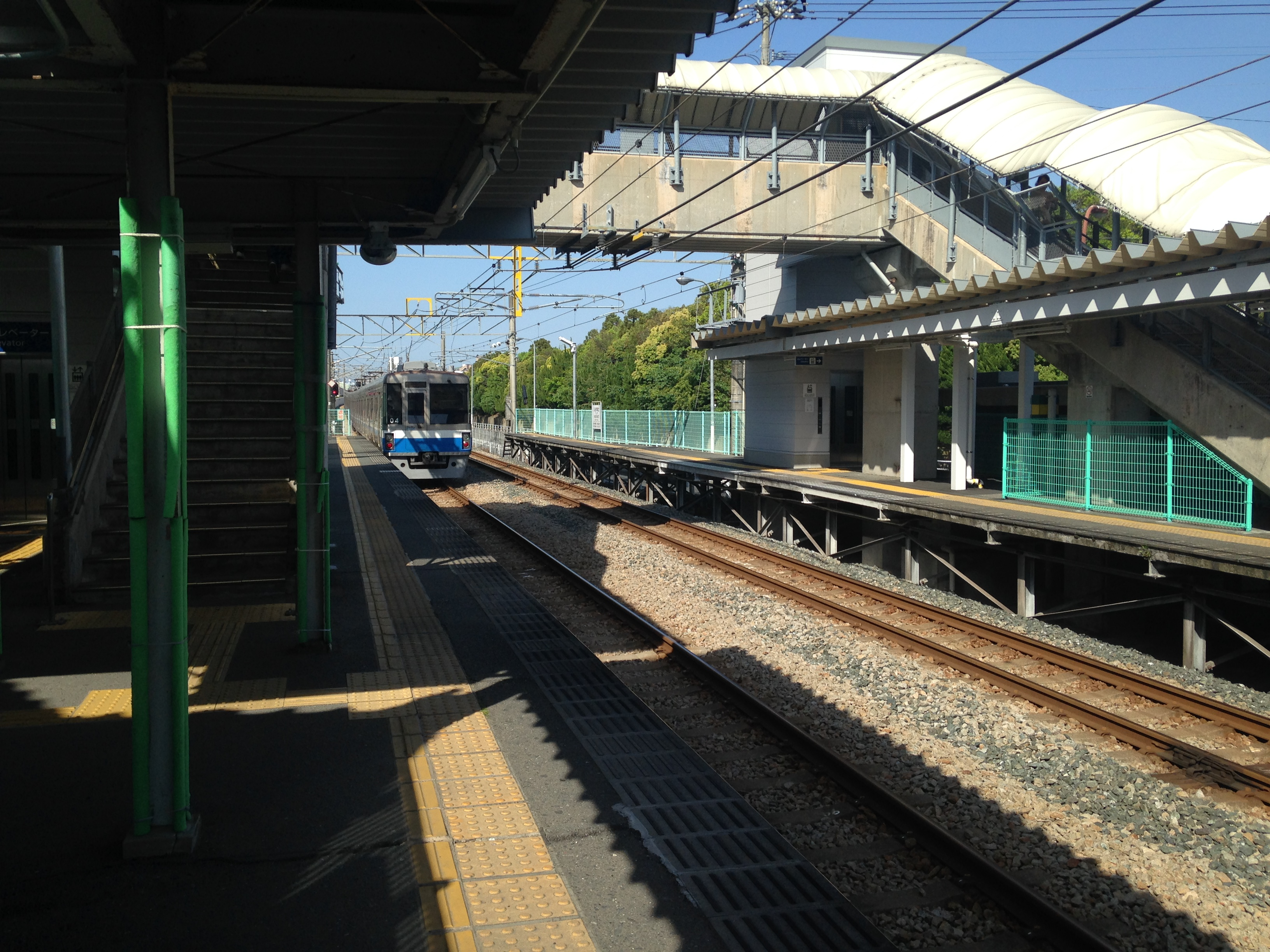
A view of the platforms and tracks. Note the elevator shafts.

== History ==
Japanese National Railways (JNR) opened the station on 20 July 1986 as an additional station on the existing track of the Chikuhi Line. With the privatization of JNR on 1 April 1987, control of the station passed to JR Kyushu.

== Passenger statistics ==
In fiscal 2020, the station was used by an average of 2388 passengers daily (boarding passengers only), and it ranked 62nd among the busiest stations of JR Kyushu.

== Surrounding area ==
- Fukuoka City Subway - Meinohama train depot
- Genkō Bōrui

== See also ==
- List of railway stations in Japan
