= Genkō Bōrui =

Defensive stone wall in Fukuoka, Japan

- 元寇防塁
- Nishi-ku to Higashi-ku, Fukuoka Japan
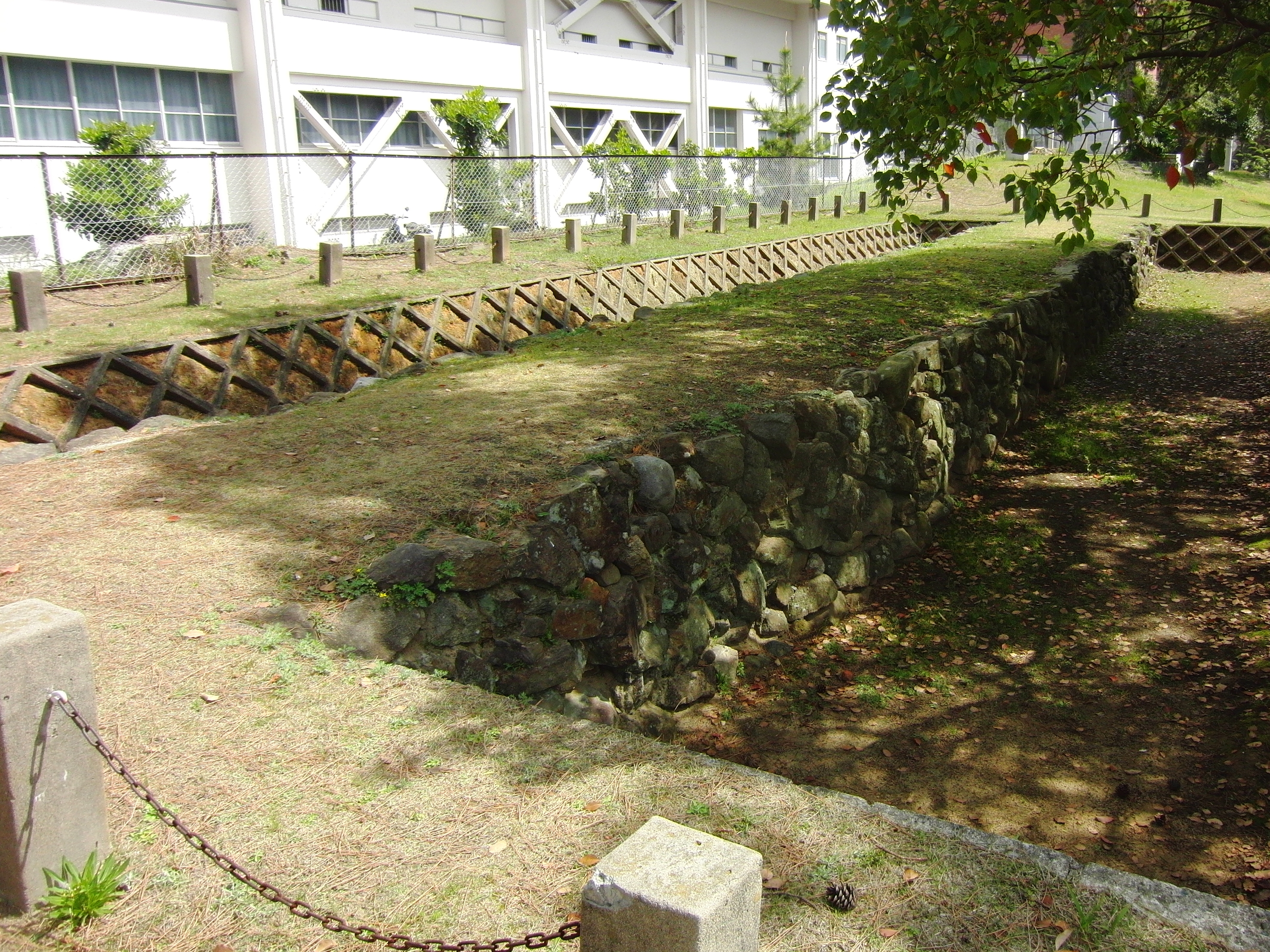
- A stone defense wall (Genkō Bōrui) at Nishijin, near Seinan University. Currently, only the top of a few stone walls are exposed to the ground, and most of them have been reclaimed

Site information
- Type: Fortification line
- Open to the public: Yes (no public facilities)
- Condition: Ruins

Location
- Location within Fukuoka Prefecture Location within Japan
- Coordinates: 33°35′08″N 130°18′30″E

Site history
- Built: 1276-1332
- Built by: Kamakura shogunate
- Battles/wars: Mongol invasions of Japan

The Genkō Bōrui (元寇防塁) was a defensive stone wall, 20 kilometres (12 mi) long, constructed along Hakata Bay in Fukuoka Prefecture, Japan in preparation for an attack by Mongol forces of the Yuan dynasty after the first attack of 1274. The second attack of 1281 was thwarted by a typhoon, or kamikaze, and the Mongols were forced to withdraw. In the Edo period, some of the stones were reused for the construction of Fukuoka Castle, though Genkō Bōrui has remained intact at several points along the Hakata Bay. It was originally called "Ishitsuiji" (石築地). It was designated a National Historic Site on March 30, 1931.

== History ==
When the Mongol invasions of Korea ended in 1270 with Korean surrender, the Sambyeolcho Rebellion broke out prolonging fighting there from 1270-1273. This period saw both the Sambyeolcho and the Mongol Empire reach out to Japan diplomatically. The Sambyeolcho primarily operated off islands to the south of the Korean peninsula. While no alliance was reached with Japan, their island-based rebellion delayed a potential invasion of the Japanese archipelago. The Ganghwasanseong and Hwanhaejangseong fortresses in Korea were built on coastlines during these invasions. Sambyeolcho envoys to Japan may have provided information that inspired the construction of the similarly-designed and intentioned Genkō Bōrui.

The Mongol invasions Genkō (元寇) of Japan in 1274 and 1281 were major military efforts undertaken by Kublai Khan to conquer Japan. After the failure of the first invasion, the Kamakura shogunate initiated a series of projects in 1275 to prepare for the next invasion, which they felt was imminent. In addition to improving the organization of the samurai of Kyushu, they ordered the construction of a large stone wall and other defensive structures at many potential landing points, including Hakata Bay. A defensive wall was planned and a tax was levied on the samurai, temples, and shrines, of 3.3 centimetres (1.3 in) of construction stone per paddy field equivalent to one koku of rice. Construction began in March 1276. The planned date of completion for most of the wall was August of the same year, but the deadline differed depending on the strategic importance of given locations, and in actuality only a portion had been completed in time for the 1281 invasion. Construction of the defense wall was made by various Kyushu provinces and continued until 1332. These provinces continued maintenance on the wall until the early part of the Muromachi period, although by the latter half of the 14th century it had fallen into disrepair.

The portion of the Genkō Bōrui that had been completed before the second invasion prevented the enemy from landing at Hakata and the invaders were forced to anchor their ships at Shikanoshima Island. The battles occurred over several months between several thousand evenly-matched combatants. Takezaki Suenaga of Higo Province joined the battles and had artists draw scrolls concerning the Battle of Kōan. This second attack of 1281 was finally thwarted by a typhoon, or kamikaze, and the Mongols were forced to withdraw.

In the Edo period, most of the stones were used for the construction of Fukuoka Castle. It was designated a National Historic Site on March 30, 1931.

Similar fortifications also still exist along a 40-50 kilometer stretch of coastline from Tabira-cho, Hirado to Hoshika-cho, Matsuura, Nagasaki Prefecture.

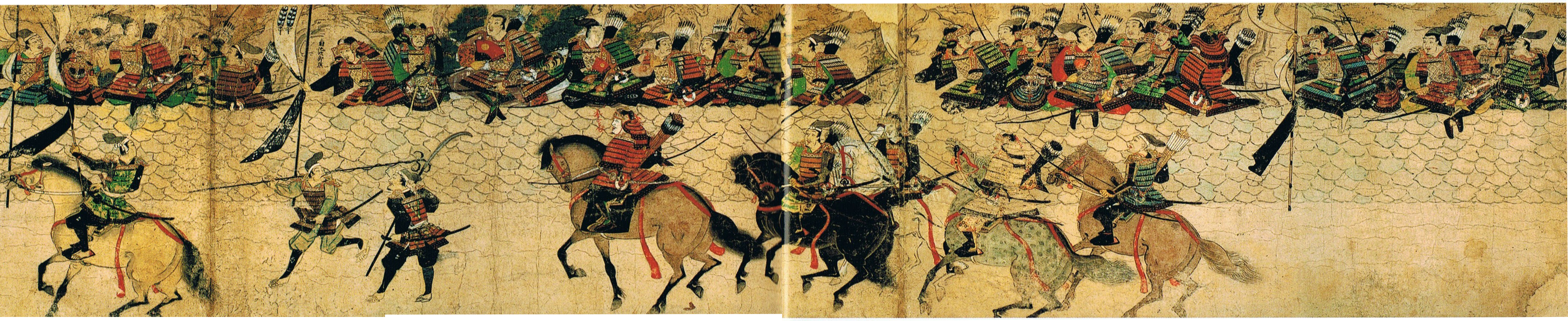
A scroll showing a small portion of the Genkō Bōrui at Ikino Matsubara

== Taxation and transformation ==
At first, battle-ready soldiers were excluded from taxation, but this policy was soon discontinued and each province in Kyushu was taxed. The tax was usually one sun (3.3 cm) of the wall's length per 1 tan of rice field; the weapons were one shield, one flag and 20 arrows per 1 jo (3.314 yards) of stone wall. The tax was in the form of men who constructed the wall and in the form of the items (weapons), but later the tax was paid in money; 114 mon per one cho of rice field was typical. The taxation continued to the early part of the Muromachi Bakufu.

== Structure ==
The Genkō Bōrui was typically 2 metres (6 ft 7 in) high and 2 metres (6 ft 7 in) wide. The western end was in Imazu in Nishi-ku, Fukuoka and the eastern end in Kashii, Higashi-ku, Fukuoka, and about 20 kilometres (12 mi) long. It was packed with small stones inside, the seaside steep and the landside less steep. Shields and flags were placed on the Genkō Bōrui and stakes were planted in the sea at irregular intervals.

== Etymology ==
In articles of the Fukuoka Nichi Nichi Shimbun ("Fukuoka Daily Newspaper") between June 12 and June 29, 1913, Heijiro Nakayama first used the words Genkō Bōrui to mean "Mongolian Invasion defense structure" and he contrasted the Genkō Bōrui from conventional stone defense by its high elevation and its design as a sand dike covered with stones; a structure which would effectively block an invasion attempt.

== Archaeological excavations ==
The Genkō Bōrui was excavated at the locations listed below. All locations were along Hakata Bay, within the city of Fukuoka.

In 1958, human bones corresponding to 200 bodies were found in Imazu near the defensive structure, with ceramics considered to have been used by those convened for the construction of the wall.

Year	Location	Remarks
1968	Ikino Matsubara near Meinohama Station	Use of sandstone and granite confirmed.
1969	Imazu near Shimoyamato Station	Basalt and granite were used, differing by location.
1970	Nishijin near the center of Seinan University	Clay and sand in alternate layers.
1978	Meinohama	Stone fill; no clay. Width is 4 metres (13 ft).
1993	Near Hakozaki Shrine	Few stones uncovered during railway construction. Nothing more of value found.
1996	Momochi near Fukuoka Dome	Scattered stones were found and investigated during the construction of an apartment building.
1998	Ikino Matsubara near Meinohama Station	Rear consists of alternate sand and clay layers.
1998	Nishijin	Inside a Seinan University building, stone and sand fences apparent.
2000	Near Hakozaki Shrine	Railway construction led to uncovering and investigation of more of the wall

== See also ==
- List of Historic Sites of Japan (Fukuoka)
