= Imajuku Station =

Railway station in Fukuoka, Japan

JK 03 Imajuku Station 今宿駅
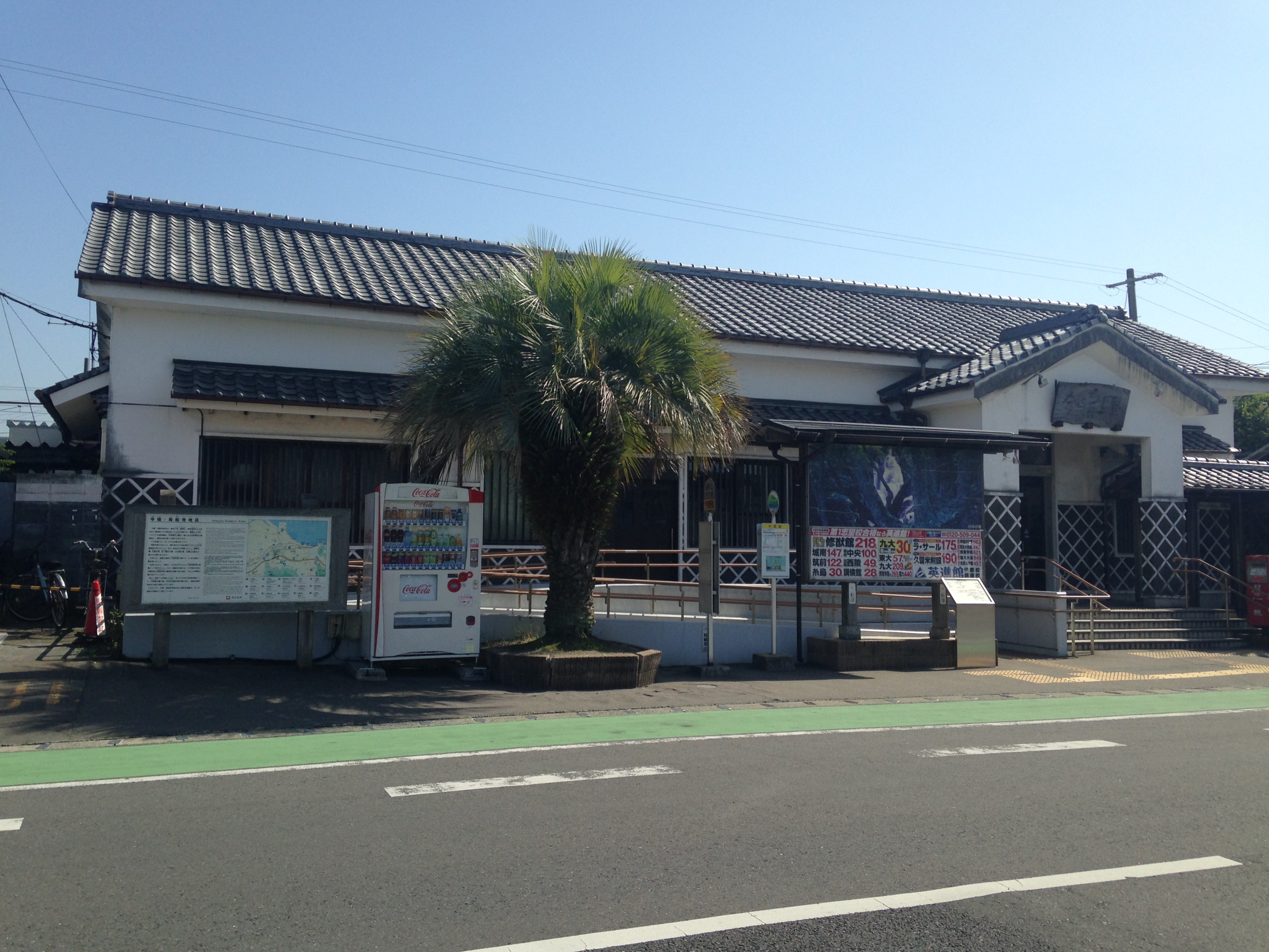
- Imajuku Station in 2015

General information
- Location: 1-chōme-1 Imajuku Ekimae, Nishi-ku, Fukuoka-shi, Fukuoka-ken, 819-0168; Japan
- Coordinates: 33°34′47″N 130°16′25″E
- Operator: JR Kyushu
- Line: JK Chikuhi Line
- Distance: 5.2 km from Meinohama
- Platforms: 1 island platform
- Tracks: 2 + 2 sidings

Construction
- Structure type: At grade
- Accessible: Yes - access to island platform via footbridge with elevators

Other information
- Status: Staffed ticket window (Midori no Madoguchi) (outsourced)
- Website: Official website

History
- Opened: 15 April 1925; 101 years ago

Passengers
- FY2020: 4329 daily
- Rank: 34th (among JR Kyushu stations)

Services
| Preceding station | JR Kyushu | Following station |
|---|---|---|
| Kyūdai-Gakkentoshi towards Nishi-Karatsu | Chikuhi Line Local | Shimoyamato towards Meinohama |
Location
- Location within Fukuoka Prefecture Location within Japan

Imajuku Station (今宿駅, Imajuku-eki) is a passenger railway station in located in Nishi-ku, Fukuoka City, Fukuoka Prefecture, Japan. The station is operated by JR Kyushu.

== Lines ==
The station is served by the Chikuhi Line and is located 5.2 km from the starting point of the line at Meinohama. Local and weekday rapid services on the Chikuhi Line stop at this station.

== Station layout ==
The station consists of an island platform serving two tracks at grade. Sidings branch off the main tracks on either side. The station building is of traditional Japanese design with a tiled roof. It houses a waiting area, a kiosk and a staffed ticket window. Access to the island platform is by means of two footbridges, one of which is fitted with elevators.

Management of the station has been outsourced to the JR Kyushu Tetsudou Eigyou Co., a wholly owned subsidiary of JR Kyushu specialising in station services. It staffs the ticket counter which is equipped with a Midori no Madoguchi facility.

=== Platforms ===
| 1 | ■ JK Chikuhi Line | for Meinohama, Tenjin, Hakata and Fukuoka Airport |
| 2 | ■ JK Chikuhi Line | for Chikuzen-Maebaru, Chikuzen-Fukae, Karatsu and Nishi-Karatsu |

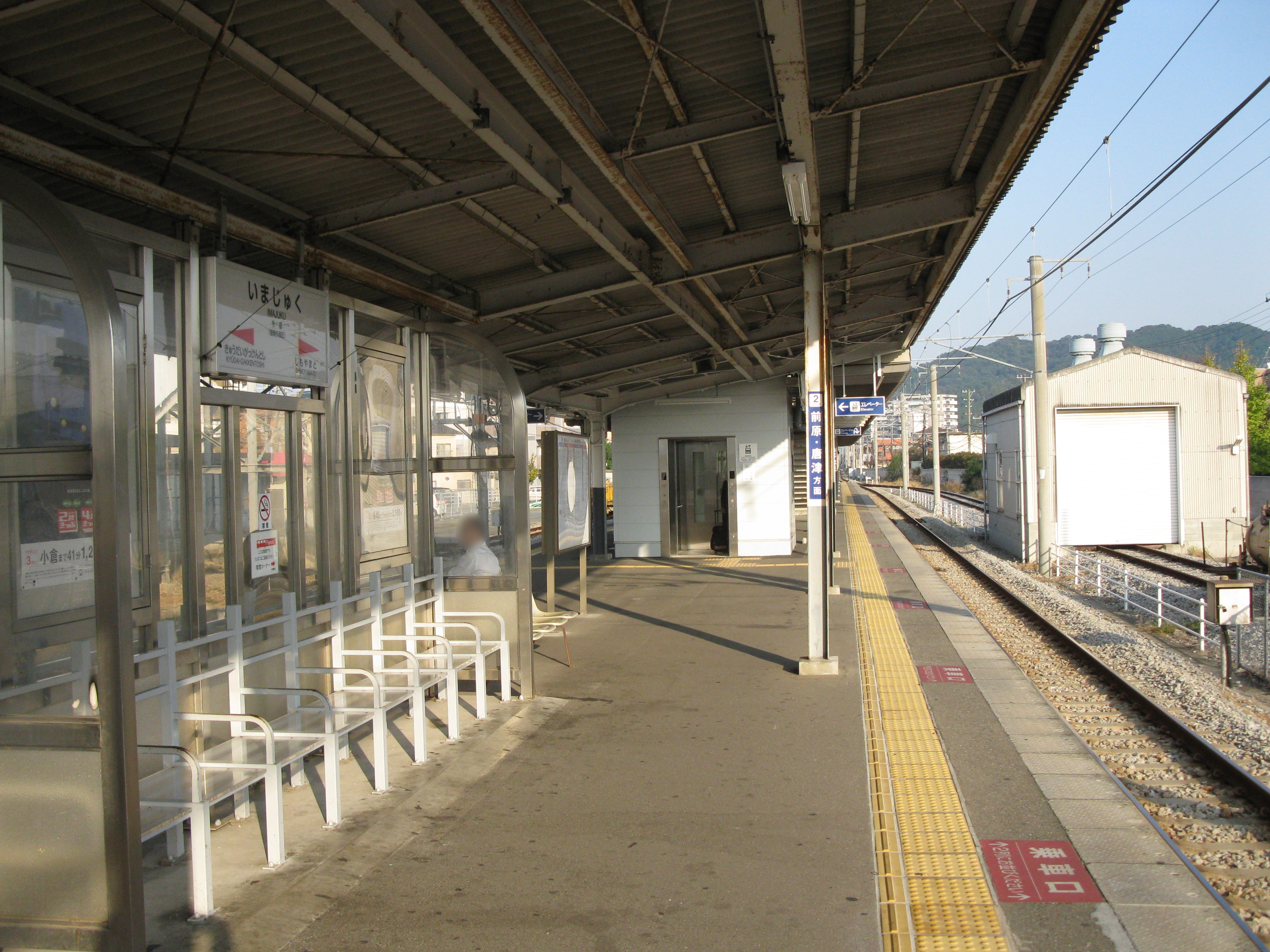
A view of the platform. Note the elevator and the siding on the right.

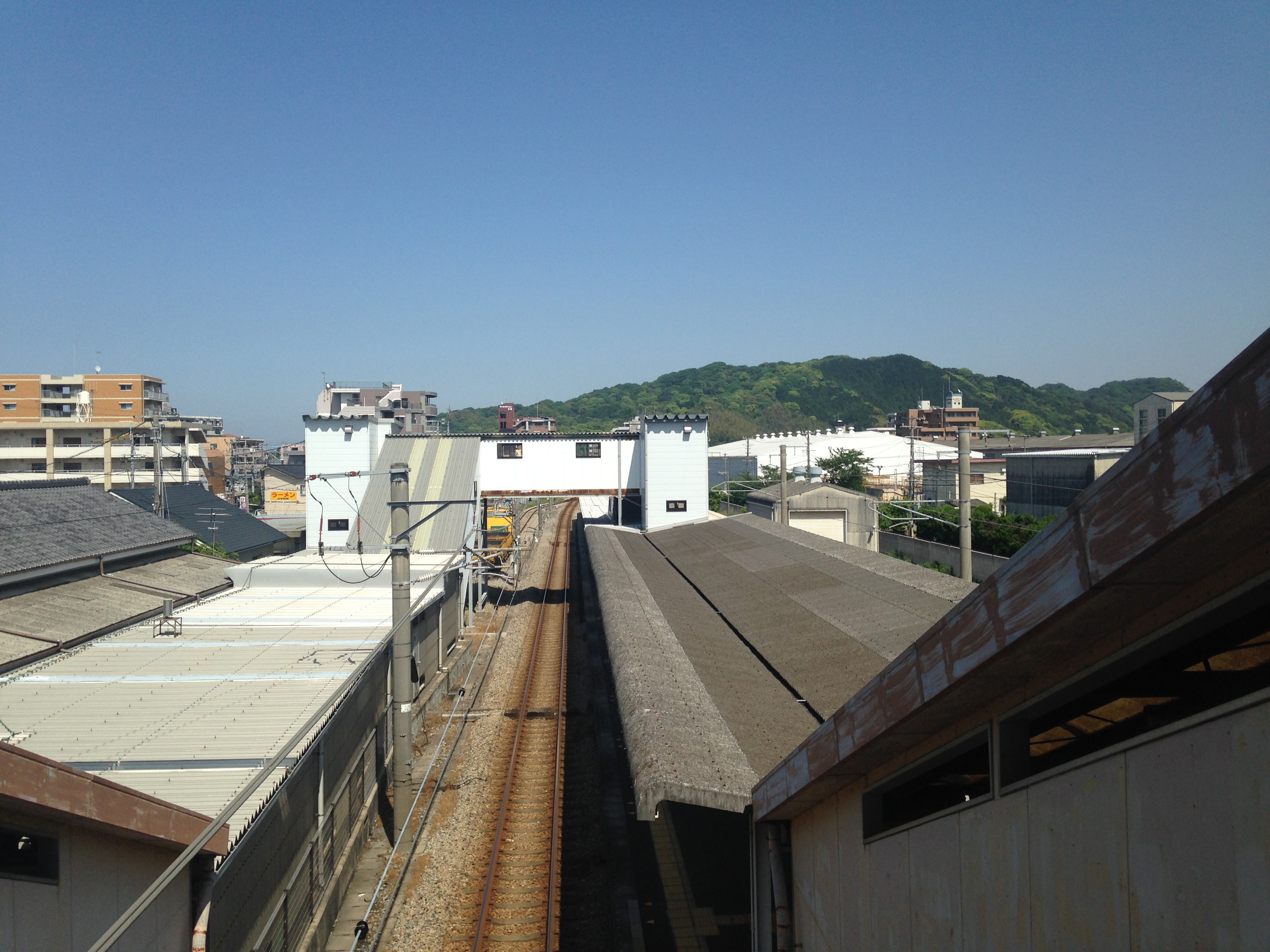
Two footbridges serve the platform. The one in the distance is fitted with elevator shafts.

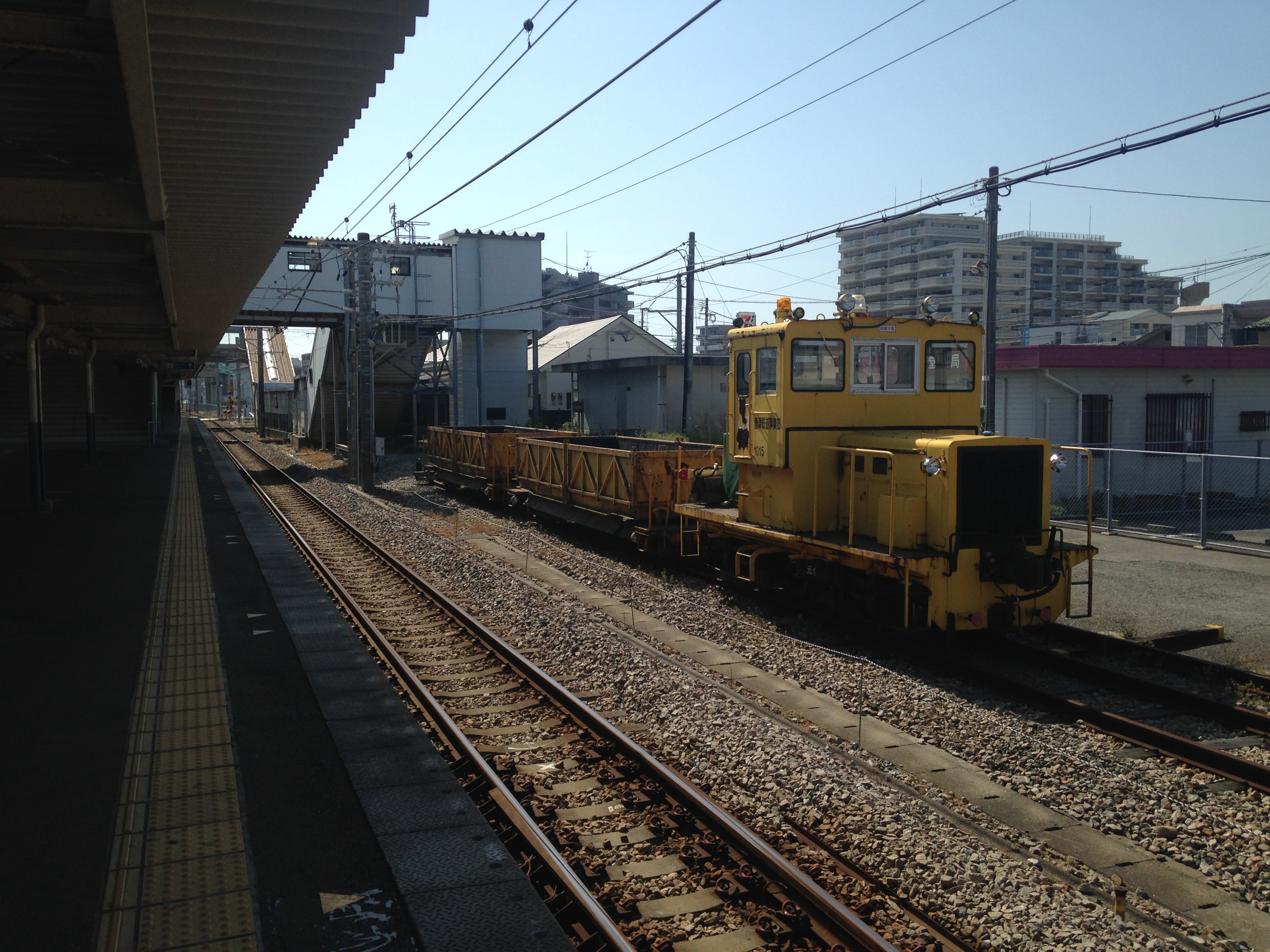
Track maintenance vehicle on one of the sidings. The station building is to the right, partly obscured by the bridge.

== History ==
The private Kitakyushu Railway had opened a track between Fukuyoshi and Hamasaki on 5 December 1923. By 1 April 1924, the line had been extended eastwards to Chikuzen-Maebaru. In the third phase of expansion, the line was extended further east with Meinohama opening as the new eastern terminus on 15 April 1925. On the same day, Imajuku was opened as an intermediate station on the new track. When the Kitakyushu Railway was nationalized on 1 October 1937, Japanese Government Railways (JGR) took over control of the station and designated the line which served it as the Chikuhi Line. With the privatization of Japanese National Railways (JNR), the successor of JGR, on 1 April 1987, control of the station passed to JR Kyushu.

== Passenger statistics ==
In fiscal 2020, the station was used by an average of 4329 passengers daily (boarding passengers only), and it ranked 34th among the busiest stations of JR Kyushu.

== Surrounding area ==
- Nishi ward office Imajuku branch office
- Fukuoka City Imajuku Elementary School

== See also ==
- List of railway stations in Japan
