= Aewol =

Town in Jeju City, South Korea

- eup
- Location within South Korea
- Coordinates: 33°25′55.13″N 126°23′19.54″E
- Country: South Korea

Area
  - Total: 202.16 km^{2} (78.05 sq mi)

Population (2019)
  - Total: 37,458
  - Density: 185.29/km^{2} (479.90/sq mi)
- Dialect: Jeju

Korean name
- Hangul: 애월읍
- Hanja: 涯月邑
- RR: Aewol-eup
- MR: Aewŏl-ŭp

Aewol (Korean: 애월) is an eup (town) located in Jeju City, Jeju Province, South Korea.

== History ==
Timeline of Aewol-eup history:

- 1935: Sinwu-myeon (신우면) was renamed to Aewol-myeon (애월면)
- December 1980: Aewol-myeon was designated as a Town

== Educational institutions ==
- Aewol Elementary (애월초등학교)
- Gwaggeum Elementary (곽금초등학교)
- Uhdo Elementary (어도초등학교)
- Nabeup Elementary (납읍초등학교)
- Gueom Elementary (구엄초등학교)
- Hagwi Elementary (하귀초등학교)
- Mulme Elementary (물메초등학교)
- Jangjeon Elementary (장전초등학교)
- Gwangryung Elementary (광령초등학교)
- Hagwiil Elementary (하귀일초등학교)
- Aewol Middle (애월중학교)
- Shinum Middle (신엄중학교)
- Kwiil Middle (귀일중학교)
- Aewol High (애월고등학교)
- Jeju Foreign Language High School (제주외국어고등학교)
- Youngsong School (제주영송학교)
