= Jocheon =

- eup
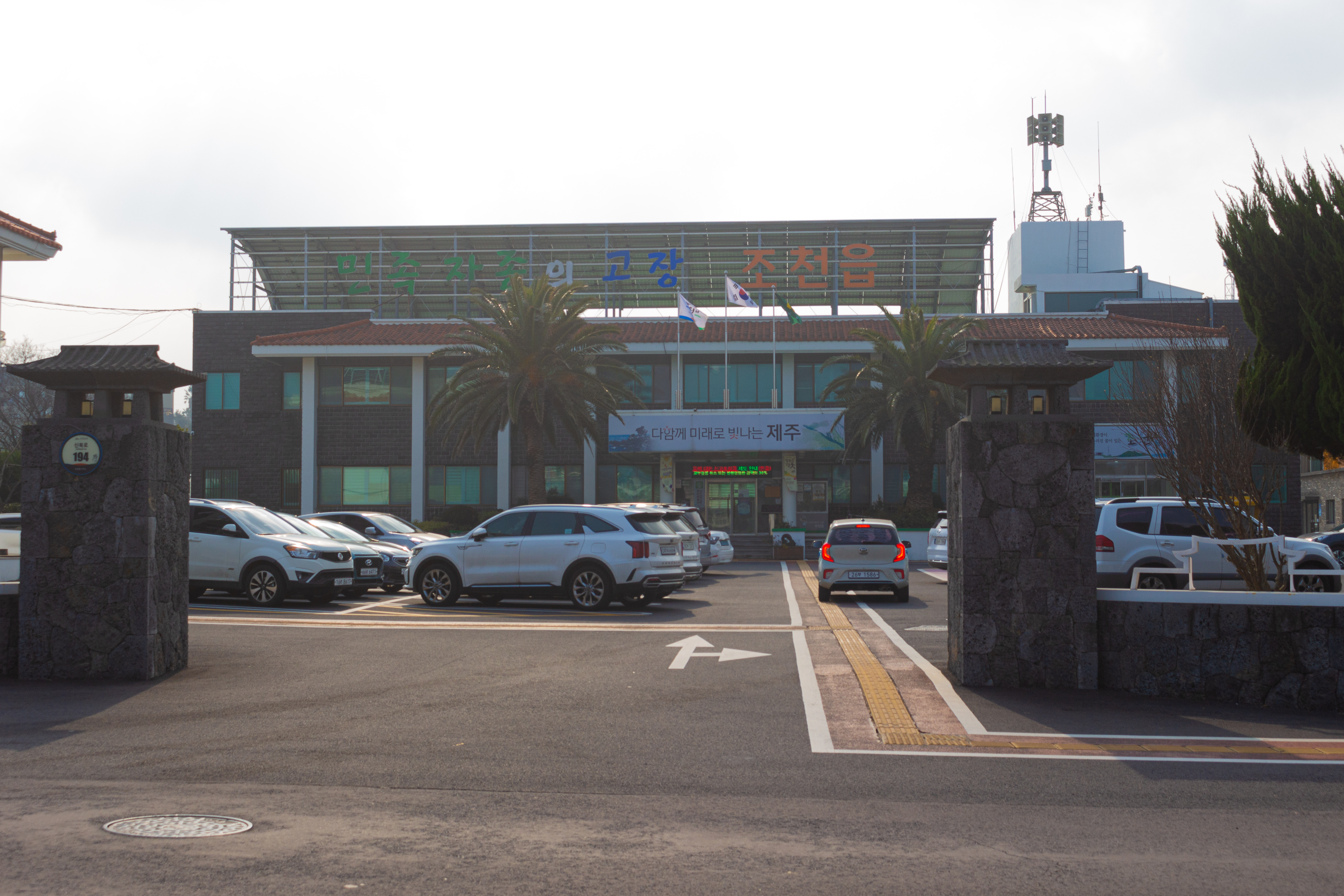
- Town hall

- Location within South Korea
- Coordinates: 33°28′9.62″N 126°39′58.90″E
- Country: South Korea

Area
  - Total: 150.64 km^{2} (58.16 sq mi)

Population (2019)
  - Total: 25,504
  - Density: 169.30/km^{2} (438.50/sq mi)
- Dialect: Jeju

Korean name
- Hangul: 조천읍
- Hanja: 朝天邑
- RR: Jocheon-eup
- MR: Choch'ŏn-ŭp

Jocheon (Korean: 조천읍) is a town located in Jeju City, Jeju Province, South Korea.
