= Kaesong city walls =

Ancient walls now in North Korea

Coordinates: 37.9886°N 126.5728°E

- Chosŏn'gŭl: 개성옛성
- Hancha: 開城古城
- Revised Romanization: Gaeseong-yetseong
- McCune–Reischauer: Kaesŏng-yetsŏng

The Walled City of Kaesong surround the royal castle, Manwoldae. The walls have a total length of 23 km and are partially preserved.

The walls were built using the surrounding landscape as a defensive structure (Korean city walls were generally constructed on the crests of hills), following the principles of geomancy. The inner walls were first constructed in 919 while outer walls were built between 1009 and 1029. Small walls have likely been present on the site since the Silla period; the walls were made from beaten earth during the Koryo dynasty. Many portions were rebuilt with stone during the 14th Century. A large portion of the stone walls still exist into modern times, and parts of the earthen walls are still visible. The exterior wall date from the 11th Century and the interior wall from the 14th Century.

The walls had around twenty gates, many of which survive today.

It is listed as a National Treasures of North Korea.

== Four walls ==
- Kungsong (Korean: 궁성; Hanja: 宮城, Manwoldae; Korean: 만월대; Hanja: 滿月臺)
- Hwangsong (Korean: 황성; Hanja: 皇城, Parochamsong; Korean: 발어참성; Hanja: 拔禦塹城)
- Naesong (Korean: 내성; Hanja: 內城, Panwolsong; Korean: 반월성; Hanja: 半月城)
- Oesong (Korean: 외성; Hanja: 外城, Rasong; Korean: 라성; Hanja: 羅城)
