= 2003 Saga gubernatorial election =

Election for Governor of Saga Prefecture

← 1999	13 April 2003	2007 →
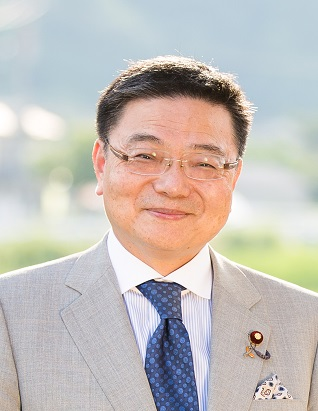
Nominee	Yasushi Furukawa	Iwamasa Miyahara	Hisatoshi Higuchi
Party	Independent	Independent	Independent
Popular vote	332,785	147,842	76,520
Nominee	Tomoki Kinoshita	Koreyuki Fukushima	Shigeto Hayashida
Party	Independent	Independent	Independent
Popular vote	30,149	25,577	19,035
Governor before election
Isamu Imoto
Independent
Elected Governor
Yasushi Furukawa
Independent

A gubernatorial election was held on 13 April 2003 to elect the Governor of Saga Prefecture. Newcomer Yasushi Furukawa won the election.

== Candidates ==
- Yasushi Furukawa - retired (most recent job: former manager of Nagasaki Prefecture General Affairs Department), age 44
- Iwamasa Miyahara (宮原岩政, Miyahara Iwamasa) - member of the Saga Prefectural Assembly, age 61
- Hisatoshi Higuchi - civil servant at MAFF and later mayor of Kashima, Saga, age 57
- Tomoki Kinoshita (木下知己, Kinoshita Tomoki) - professor at Nasu University, age 55
- Koreyuki Fukushima (福島是幸, Fukushima Koreyuki) - former prefectural high school teacher union chairman, age 63
- Shigeto Hayashida (林田重人, Hayashida Shigeto) - former prefectural superintendent of education, age 66

== Results ==
2003 Saga gubernational election
Party	Candidate	Votes	%	±%
Independent	Yasushi Furukawa	160,809		
Independent	Iwamasa Miyahara	147,842		
Independent	Hisatoshi Higuchi	76,520		
Independent	Tomoki Kinoshita	30,149		
Independent	Koreyuki Fukushima	25,577		
Independent	Shigeto Hayashida	19,035		
