= 2011 Saga gubernatorial election =

Election for Governor of Saga Prefecture

← 2007	10 April 2011	2015 →
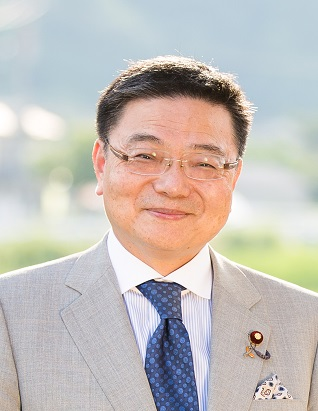
Nominee	Yasushi Furukawa	Masakatsu Hirabayashi
Party	Independent	JCP
Popular vote	337,269	57,461
Governor before election
Yasushi Furukawa
Independent
Elected Governor
Yasushi Furukawa
Independent

The 2011 Saga gubernatorial election was held on 10 April 2011 to elect the Governor of Saga Prefecture. Incumbent Yasushi Furukawa was re-elected.

== Candidates ==
- Yasushi Furukawa – incumbent Governor of Saga Prefecture, age 52
- Masakatsu Hirabayashi (平林正勝, Hirabayashi Masakatsu) – Communist Party committee chairman and candidate in the 2007 Saga gubernational election, age 63

== Results ==
Saga Gubernational Election 2011
Party	Candidate	Votes	%	±%
Independent	Yasushi Furukawa (incumbent)	337,269		
JCP	Masakatsu Hirabayashi	57,461		
