= Hiroshi Ogushi =

Japanese politician

- 大串 博志
- Official portrait, 2012

Member of the House of Representatives
- In office 11 September 2005 – 23 January 2026
- Preceded by: Multi-member district
- Succeeded by: Yasushi Furukawa
- Constituency: Kyushu PR (2005–2009); Saga 2nd (2009–2012); Kyushu PR (2012–2017); Saga 2nd (2017–2026)

Personal details
- Born: 31 August 1965 (age 61) Shiroishi, Saga, Japan
- Party: CRA (since 2026)
- Other political affiliations: DPJ (2005–2016); DP (2016–2017); KnT (2017–2018); Independent (2018–2019); GoI (2018–2019); CDP (2019–2026)
- Children: 2
- Education: University of California, Los Angeles; University of Tokyo

Hiroshi Ogushi (大串 博志, Ōgushi Hiroshi; born 31 August 1965) is a Japanese former politician who served as a member of the House of Representatives in the Diet (national legislature). A native of Kishima District, Saga and graduate of the University of Tokyo, he joined the Ministry of Finance in 1989 and received an MBA from University of California, Los Angeles in the United States while in the ministry. Leaving the ministry in 2005, he was elected to the House of Representatives for the first time in the same year.

In June 2007, Ogushi was blamed for attending the funeral of a yakuza member. The yakuza member, Zenji Tsurumaru, was a senior member of the designated yakuza group Kyushu Seido-kai, who was murdered by the group's rival syndicate Dojin-kai. Ogushi said that he never met Tsurumaru and was compelled to attend by a political supporter.

In 2017, he ran in the Kibō no Tō leadership election, losing against Yuichiro Tamaki. When Kibō merged with the Democratic Party in May 2018 to form the Democratic Party for the People, Ogushi decided not to join the new party and became an independent member instead.
