= Takuma Kubo =

Japanese baseball player

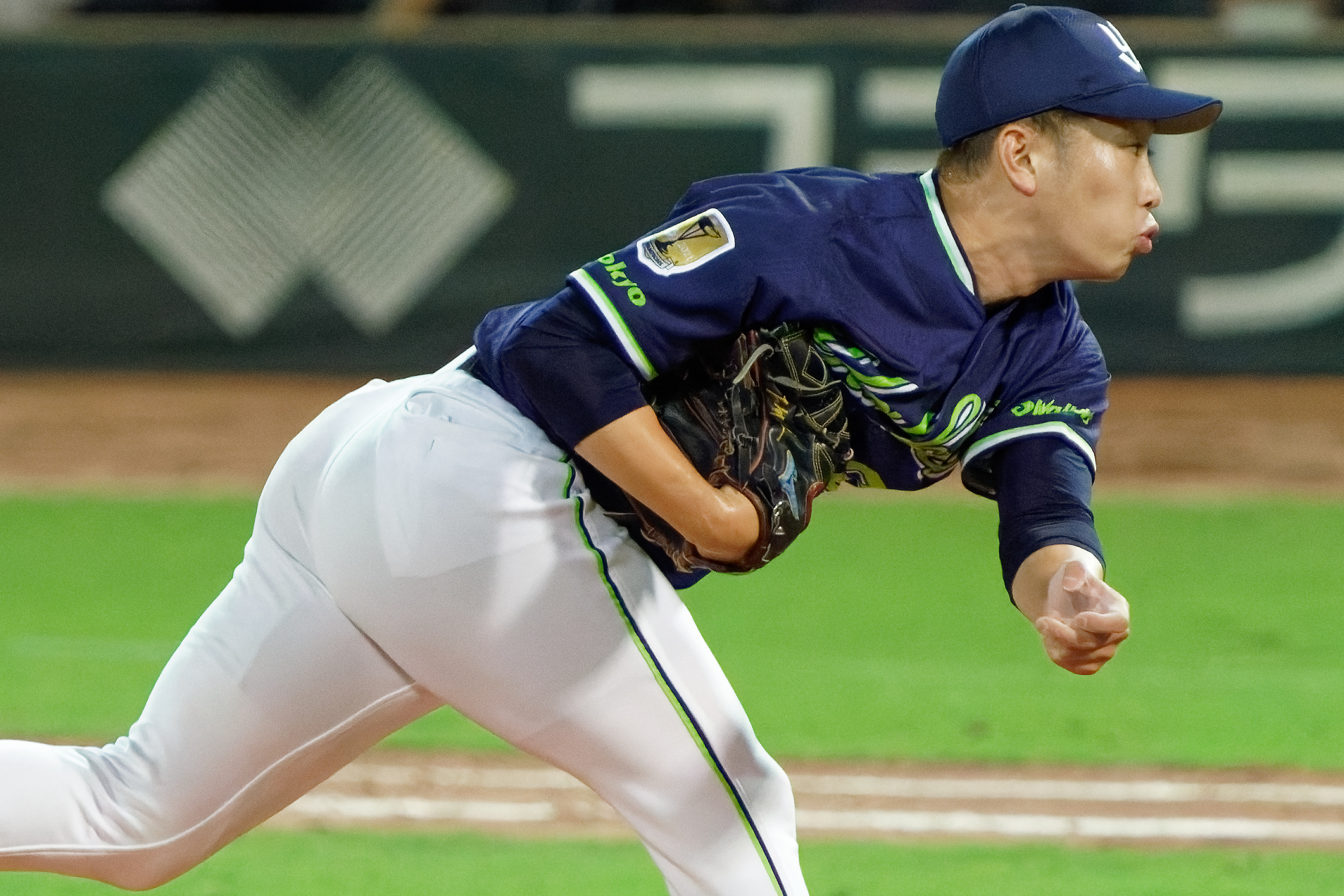

Tokyo Yakult Swallows – No. 61
- Pitcher
- Born: July 27, 1996 (age 29); Imari, Saga, Japan
- Bats: Left Throws: Left

NPB debut
- May 28, 2019, for the Tokyo Yakult Swallows

Career statistics (through April 7, 2022)
- Win–loss record: 0–1
- Earned run average: 7.09
- Strikeouts: 27
- Stats at Baseball Reference

Teams
- Tokyo Yakult Swallows (2019–present)

Takuma Kubo (久保拓眞, Kubo Takuma; born July 27, 1996 in Imari, Saga, Japan) is a professional Japanese baseball player. He is a pitcher for the Tokyo Yakult Swallows of Nippon Professional Baseball (NPB).
