= 1991 Saga gubernatorial election =

Election for Governor of Saga Prefecture

← 1987	7 April 1991	1995 →
Nominee	Isamu Imoto	Yoshiyuki Matsuo	Setsuo Yamaguchi
Party	Independent	JCP	Independent
Popular vote	319,927	54,165	39,587
Governor before election
Kumao Katsuki
Independent
Elected Governor
Isamu Imoto
Independent

A gubernatorial election was held on 7 April 1991 to elect the Governor of Saga Prefecture.

== Candidates ==
- Isamu Imoto - Vice-Governor of Saga Prefecture, age 65
- Yoshiyuki Matsuo (松尾義幸, Matsuo Yoshiyuki) - later city councillor at Ogi, Saga, age 43
- Setsuo Yamaguchi - high school teacher, age 41

== Results ==
Saga Gubernational Election 1991
Party	Candidate	Votes	%	±%
Independent	Isamu Imoto	319,927		
JCP	Yoshiyuki Matsuo	54,165		
Independent	Setsuo Yamaguchi	39,587		
