= Mitsutake Hikoshichi =

Japanese porcelain artist

Mitsutake Hikoshichi was a Nabeshima porcelain artist. He was trained by and worked for Buemon Hatase in Okawachiyama, Imari, Japan. His work has been displayed at the Tokyo National Museum.
