= 1995 Saga gubernatorial election =

Election for Governor of Saga Prefecture

← 1991	9 April 1995	1999 →
Nominee	Isamu Imoto	Takeo Yoshimuta
Party	Independent	Independent
Popular vote	349,676	56,006
Governor before election
Isamu Imoto
Independent
Elected Governor
Isamu Imoto
Independent

A gubernatorial election was held on 9 April 1995 to elect the Governor of Saga Prefecture. Incumbent Isamu Imoto was re-elected.

== Candidates ==
- Isamu Imoto - incumbent Governor of Saga Prefecture, age 69
- Takeo Yoshimuta (吉牟田健夫, Yoshimuta Takeo) - high school teacher, age 69

== Results ==
Saga Gubernational Election 1995
Party	Candidate	Votes	%	±%
Independent	Isamu Imoto (incumbent)	349,676		
Independent	Takeo Yoshimuta	56,006		
