= 2017 Kibō no Tō leadership election =

Political party election in Japan

- 10 November 2017
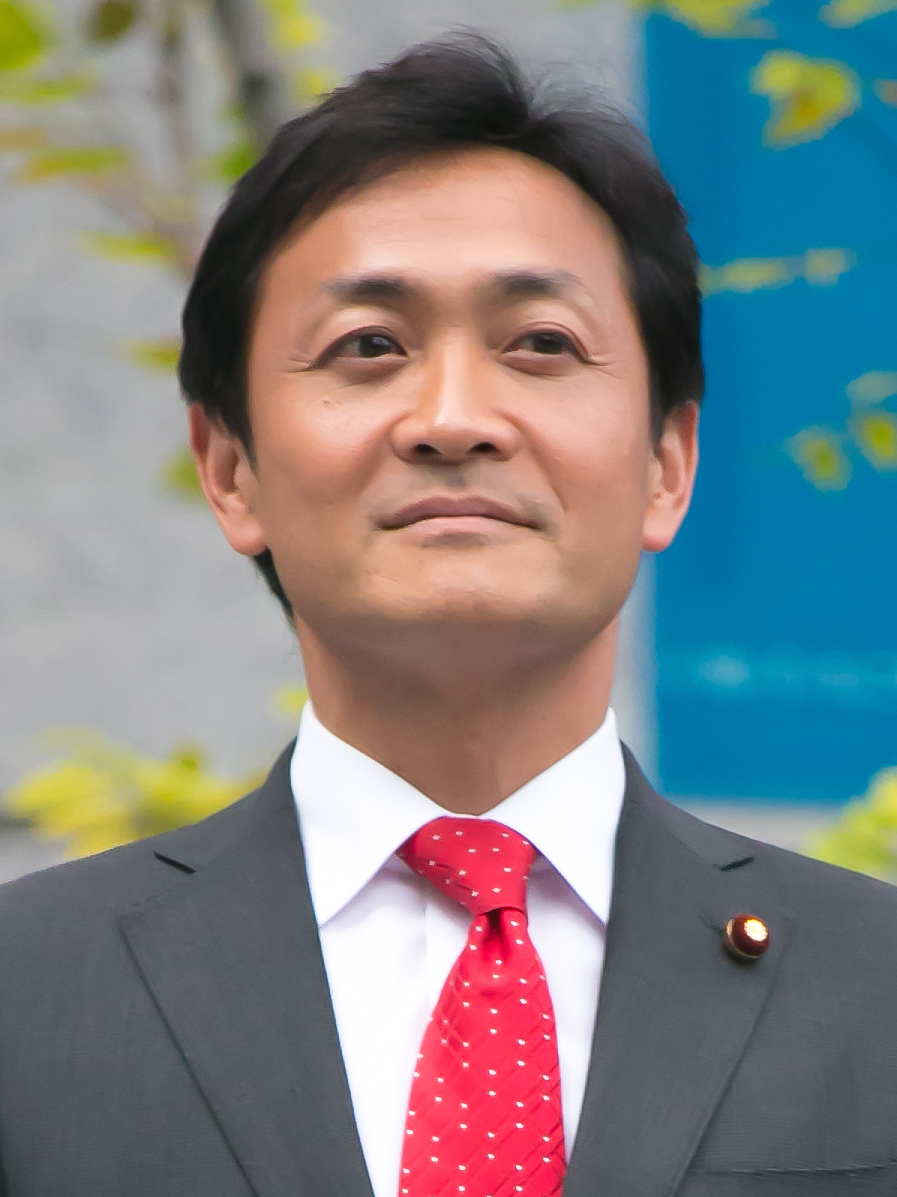

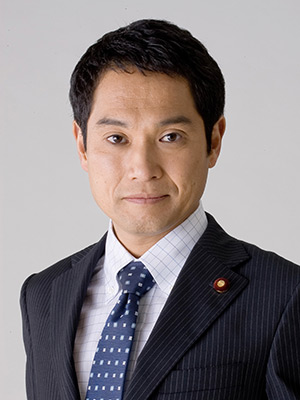
Candidate	Yuichiro Tamaki	Hiroshi Ogushi
Leader's seat	Kagawa 2nd	Saga 2nd
Caucus vote	39	14
Percentage	73.6%	26.4%
Leader before election
Yuriko Koike
Leaders after election
Yuriko Koike
Yuichiro Tamaki

The 2017 Kibō no Tō leadership election was held on 10 November 2017 to select a co-leader who would lead the party aloneside founder Yuriko Koike. Yuichiro Tamaki easily defeated Hiroshi Ogushi for the position. Four days after the election, Koike resigned as leader, leaving Tamaki as sole leader of the party.

== Background ==
Kibō no Tō (KnT) was founded on 25 September 2017 to contest the 2017 Japanese general election. It served as a political vehicle for Governor of Tokyo Yuriko Koike, who hoped to expand into national politics. The party positioned itself as "reformist conservative" and planned to field enough candidates to win a majority in the House of Representatives. In response, the major opposition Democratic Party (DP) decided not to run under its own banner in the election, instead agreeing that its members would seek nomination from KnT, and voted to merge the two parties after the election. While most DP candidates sought and acquired KnT nomination, Koike herself preemptively declared that those who disagreed with her positions on defence and the constitution would be excluded. This led the party's liberal wing, led by Yukio Edano, to form the Constitutional Democratic Party (CDP). KnT performed poorly in the election. The party counted 57 members of the House prior to the election, but only won 50 seats; the CDP rose from 15 to 55, becoming the second-largest party.

After the election, Koike stated she would focus on her duties in Tokyo and delegate governance of the party to the Diet faction. She also agreed to the appointment of a co-leader from the Diet, a promise she had made during the campaign but not yet acted on, and delegated selection to Shinji Tarutoko and Atsushi Oshima. However, a dispute arose between those who favoured an interim co-leader or the amendment of party statutes to allow a full election immediately. The party met to select personnel on 27 October and agreed to the latter option, keeping the co-leadership vacant for the time being. They also agreed to nominate Shu Watanabe for Prime Minister in the upcoming Diet ballot.

The Diet caucus approved the proposed amendments on 2 November, establishing that the caucus would elect the co-leader and eight sponsorships would be required to stand. They fixed the date of nominations for 8 November and the election for 10 November.

== Candidates and contest ==
Tamaki was considered a contender from the beginning, supported by especially by younger Diet members. He pushed strongly for the election of a co-leader and quickly declared his intention to stand. He faced Hiroshi Ogushi, who served as Special Advisor to Yoshihiko Noda during his government. Ogushi was relatively more left-leaning and supported by mid-ranking former DP lawmakers.

Ogushi advocated for working closely with other opposition parties, including forming a joint parliamentary group with the CDP. Tamaki was cautious about cooperation and stated the party should define itself before seeking alliances; he stated he wanted Kibō no Tō to be a "tolerant conservative party". While Ogushi was harshly critical of the Shinzo Abe government's security and defence policy, pledging to oppose its controversial security legislation, Tamaki suggested amending it instead. Ogushi also opposed any amendment to Article 9 while Tamaki stated there was room for debate on the issue. In regard to the labour market, Tamaki advocated moving away from the technical internship program and promoting permanent immigration instead, while Ogushi was concerned about the effect of increased immigration on Japanese "society and culture".

Shu Watanabe and Kenta Izumi both intended to run, but withdrew before nominations due to lack of sponsors.

Candidate	Offices held
Yuichiro Tamaki (age 48); Kagawa Prefecture	Member of the House of Representatives (2009–); Deputy Secretary-General of the Democratic Party (2016–17)
Hiroshi Ogushi (age 52); Saga Prefecture	Member of the House of Representatives (2005–)

=== Sponsors ===
Yuichiro Tamaki (8)	Hiroshi Ogushi (8)
House of Representatives: Motohisa Furukawa; Kentaro Genma; Shunsuke Ito; Kazuya Kondo; Hideko Nishioka; Takeshi Saiki; House of Councillors: Kuniko Koda	House of Representatives: Mitsunori Okamoto; Mitsu Shimojo; Kaname Tajima; Manabu Terata; Yoshio Maki; Kentaro Motomura; Tatsumaru Yamaoka; Kazunori Yamanoi

=== Withdrew ===
- Shu Watanabe, member of the House of Representatives (1996–)
- Kenta Izumi, member of the House of Representatives (2003–2016, 2016–) and Parliamentary Vice Minister in the Cabinet Office (2009–10)

== Results ==
Candidate	Votes	%
Yuichiro Tamaki	39	73.6
Hiroshi Ogushi	14	26.4
Total	53	100.0
Invalid	0	
Turnout	53	100
Eligible	53	
