= Fukushimaguchi Station =

Train station on the Matsuura Railway line in Saga Prefecture, Japan

Fukushimaguchi Station 福島口駅
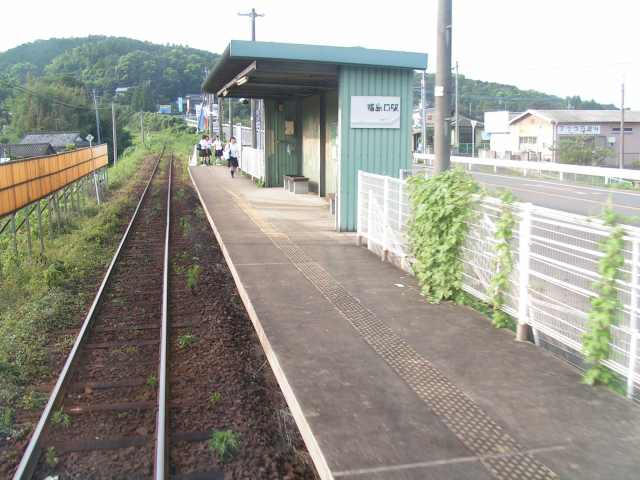
- Station platform in August 2006

General information
- Location: Imari, Saga Prefecture; Japan
- Coordinates: 33°20′18.07″N 129°47′24.90″E
- Operator: Matsuura Railway
- Line: ■ Nishi-Kyūshū Line
- Distance: 25.3 km from Arita Station
- Platforms: 1
- Tracks: 1

Construction
- Structure type: At-grade

Other information
- Website: Official website (in Japanese)

History
- Opened: 10 March 1990; 36 years ago
- Original company: Matsuura Railway
Location
- Location within Saga Prefecture Location within Japan

Fukushimaguchi Station (福島口駅, Fukushimaguchi-eki; ふくしまぐちえき) is a train station located in Imari, Saga Prefecture, Japan. It is on the Nishi-Kyūshū Line which has been operated by the third-sector Matsuura Railway since 1988.

== Lines ==
- Matsuura Railway
  - Nishi-Kyūshū Line

Trains on this branch terminate at either Imari or Saza. Travellers can transfer at Imari for local trains to Arita, or either a local or rapid train from Saza to Sasebo. It is 25.3 km from Arita.

== Station layout ==
The station consists of one ground-level side platform with a bi-directional track.

== Adjacent stations ==
«	Service	»
Nishi-Kyūshū Line
Uranosaki	Local	Imabuku

== See also ==
- List of railway stations in Japan
