= Higashi-Yamashiro Station =

Train station on the Matsuura Railway line in Saga Prefecture, Japan

Higashi-Yamashiro Station 東山代駅
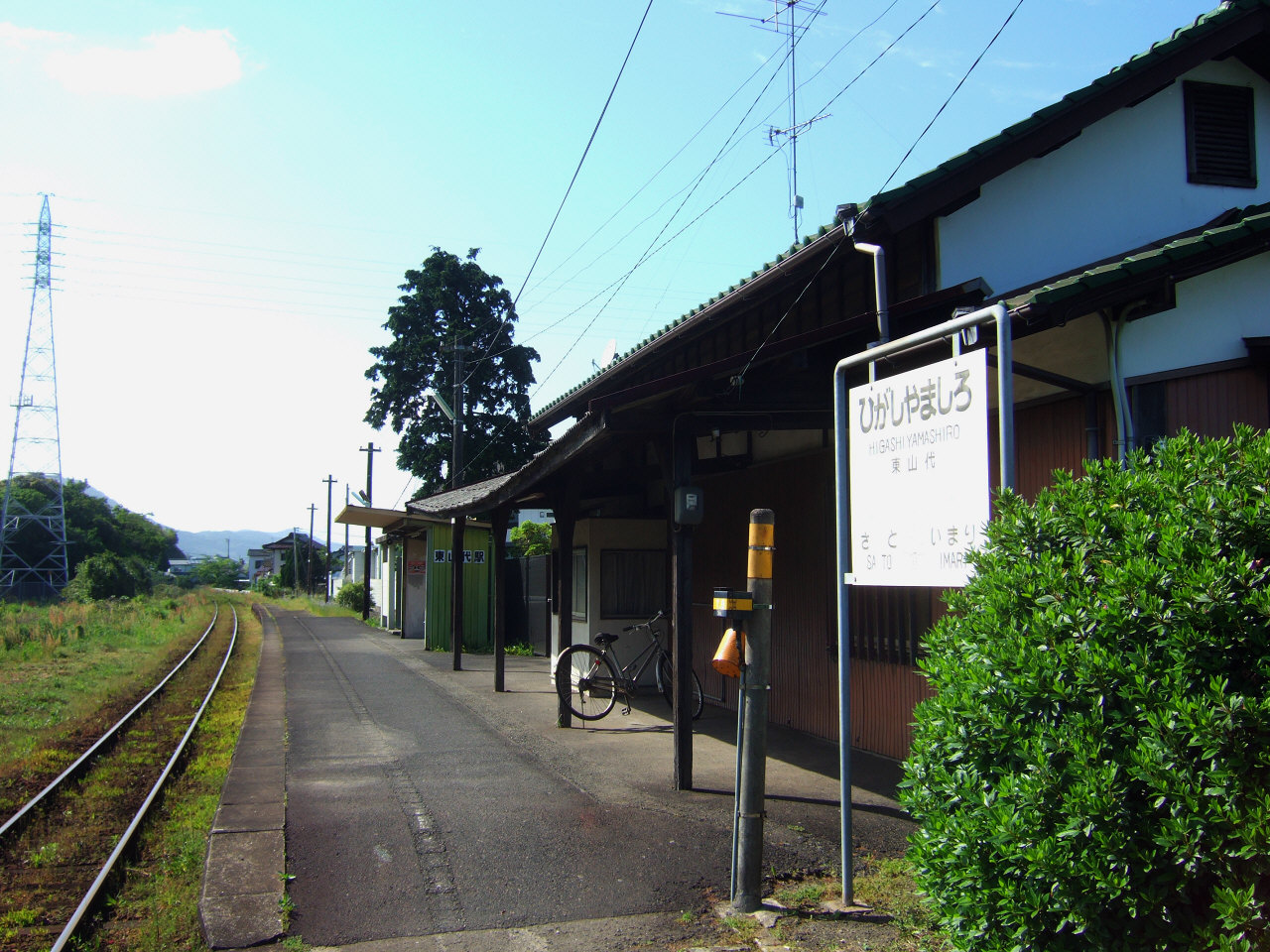
- Station platform in May 2008

General information
- Location: Imari, Saga Prefecture; Japan
- Coordinates: 33°16′41.16″N 129°50′45.20″E
- Operator: Matsuura Railway
- Line: ■ Nishi-Kyūshū Line
- Distance: 16.3 km from Arita Station
- Platforms: 1
- Tracks: 1

Construction
- Structure type: At-grade

Other information
- Website: Official website (in Japanese)

History
- Opened: 21 March 1930; 96 years ago
- Original company: Japanese National Railways
Location
- Location within Saga Prefecture Location within Japan

Higashi-Yamashiro Station (東山代駅, Higashi-Yamashiro-eki; ひがしやましろえき) is a train station located in Imari, Saga Prefecture, Japan. It is on the Nishi-Kyūshū Line which has been operated by the third-sector Matsuura Railway since 1988.

== Lines ==
- Matsuura Railway
  - Nishi-Kyūshū Line

Trains on this branch terminate at either Imari or Saza. Travellers can transfer at Imari for local trains to Arita, or either a local or rapid train from Saza to Sasebo. It is 16.3 km from Arita.

== Station layout ==
The station consists of one ground-level side platform with a bi-directional track.

== Adjacent stations ==
«	Service	»
Nishi-Kyūshū Line
Imari	Local	Sato

== See also ==
- List of railway stations in Japan
