= 1999 Saga gubernatorial election =

Election for Governor of Saga Prefecture

← 1995	11 April 1999	2003 →
Nominee	Isamu Imoto	Hiroaki Nakajima
Party	Independent	JCP
Popular vote	354,418	75,241
Governor before election
Isamu Imoto
Independent
Elected Governor
Isamu Imoto
Independent

A gubernatorial election was held on 11 April 1999 to elect the Governor of Saga Prefecture. Incumbent Isamu Imoto was re-elected.

== Candidates ==
- Isamu Imoto - incumbent Governor of Saga Prefecture, age 73
- Hiroaki Nakajima (中島博明, Nakajima Hiroaki) - former prefectural party chairman, age 67

== Results ==
Saga Gubernational Election 1999
Party	Candidate	Votes	%	±%
Independent	Isamu Imoto (incumbent)	354,418		
JCP	Hiroaki Nakajima	75,241		
