= Imari Ton-Ten-Ton Festival =

Annual fighting festival held in Japan

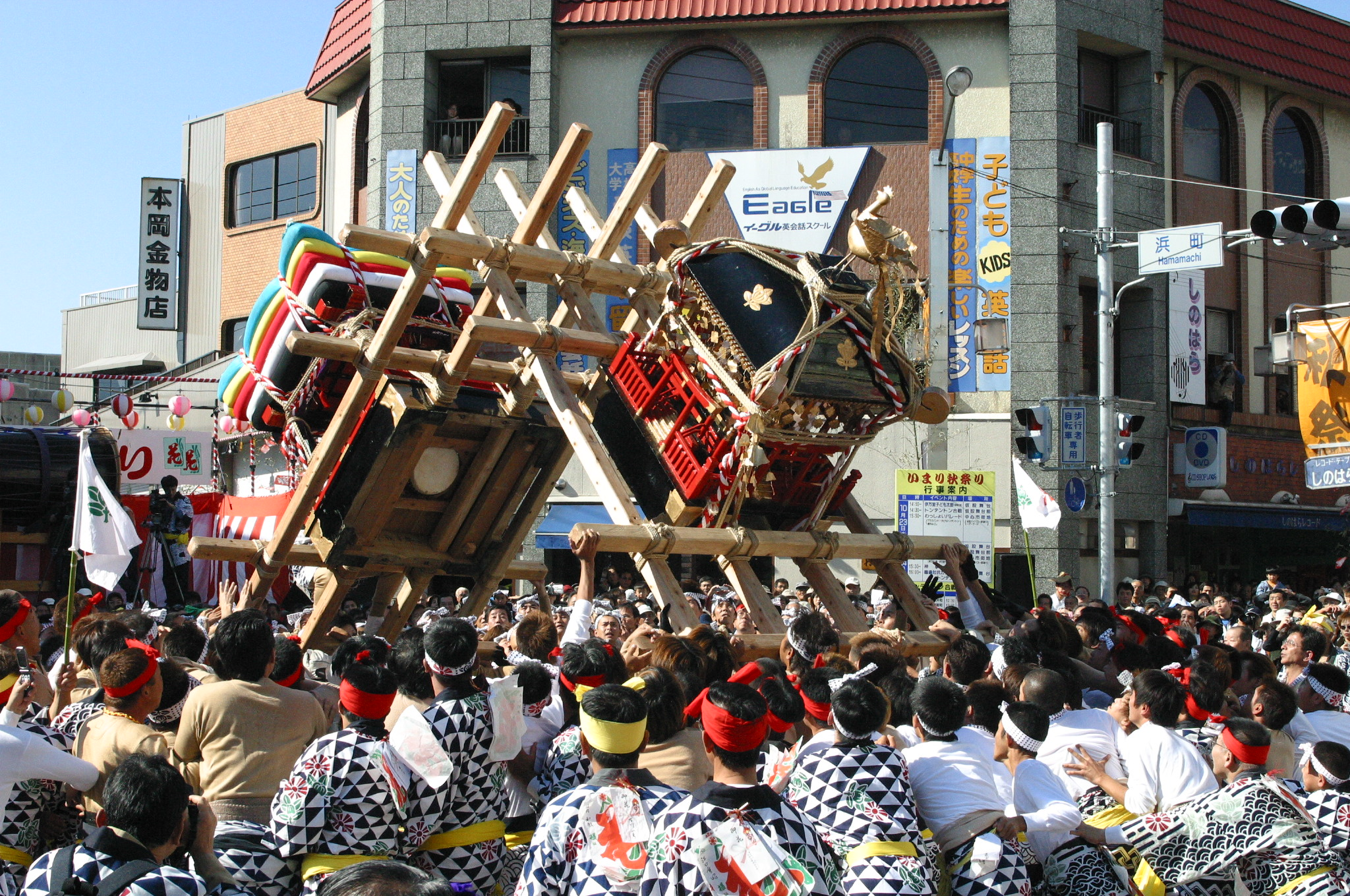

The Imari Ton-Ten-Ton Festival is a fighting festival held every year in the city of Imari, Saga Prefecture, Japan. Beginning at the Imari Shrine, the festival is well known as one of the three great fighting festivals of Japan. The festival has been held since 1829. Two shrines, Aramikoshi and Danjiri, meet at various points throughout central Imari. They are smashed together simultaneously until one shrine falls back. This is done to the sound of a beating drum within the shrine Danjiri, the sound of which gives Ton Ten Ton its name.

== Changes to the festival ==
In 1955, the number of matches was reduced and alcohol consumption by participants pulling the floats was banned. In 2006 there was a fatal accident involving a high school student. From 2013 there were changes made to the festival ensuring the safety of participants. Battle outcomes are now decided ahead of time.

== Event date ==
The event is held annually for three days in the third weekend of October.
