= Uranosaki Station =

Railway station in Imari, Japan

Coordinates: 33.3352°N 129.7927°E

Uranosaki Station 浦ノ崎駅
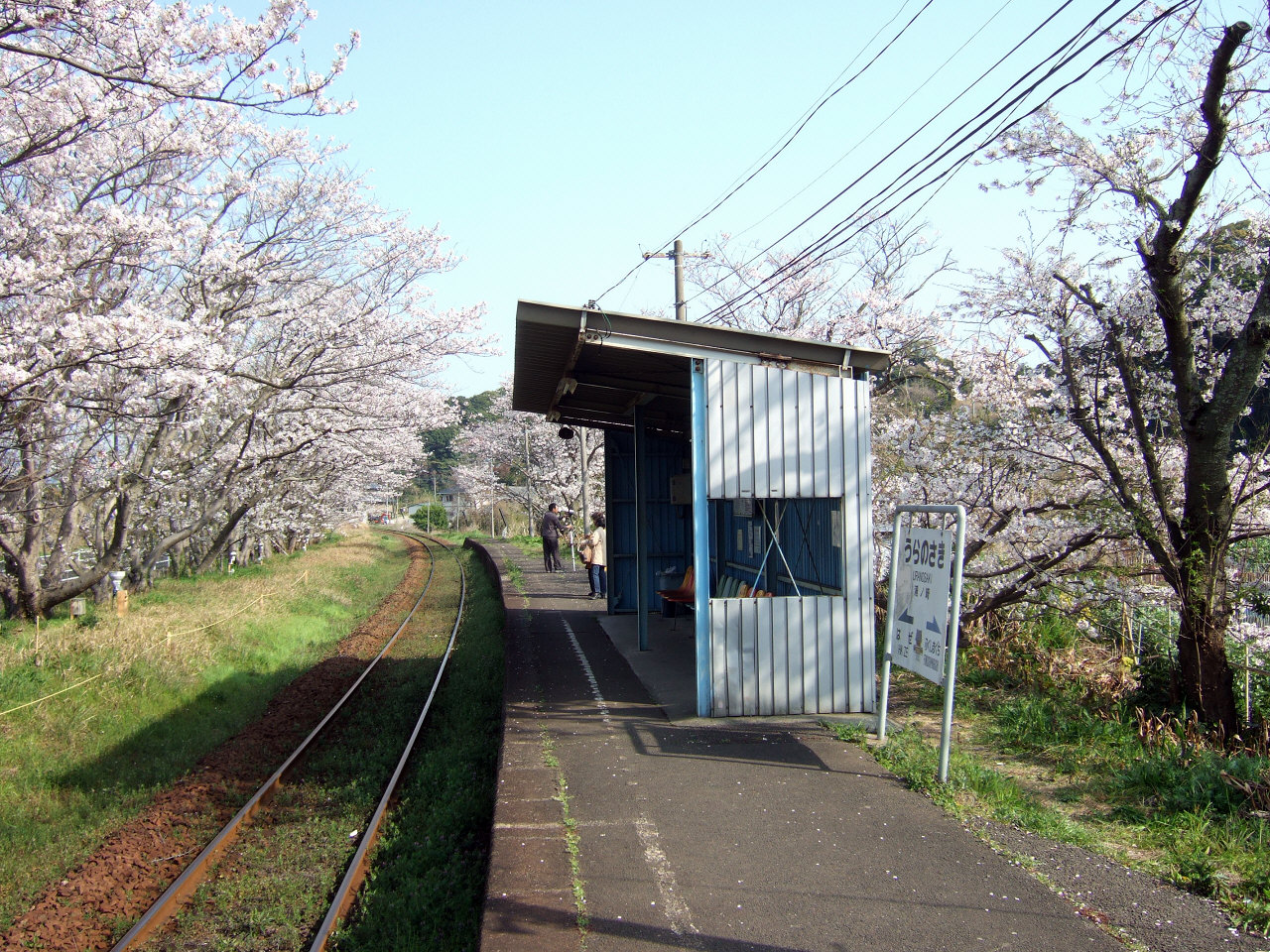

General information
- Location: Yamashiro-chō Tachiiwa, Imari, Saga （伊万里市山代町立岩） Japan
- Operator: Matsuura Railway
- Line: Nishi-Kyūshū Line

History
- Opened: 1930

Passengers
- 2005: 86 daily
Location

Uranosaki Station (浦ノ崎駅, Uranosaki-eki) is a railway station in Yamashiro-chō Tachiiwa, Imari City, Saga Prefecture. It is operated by Matsuura Railway and is on the Nishi-Kyūshū Line.

The station is popular with photographers and railfans due to an abundance of cherry blossoms surrounding the station, which creates a picturesque setting during their blooming period.

== Lines ==
- Matsuura Railway
  - Nishi-Kyūshū Line

== Adjacent stations ==
←	Service	→
Nishi-Kyūshū Line
Haze	Local	Fukushimaguchi

== Station layout ==
The station is ground level with a single side platform.

== Environs ==
- National Route 204
- Ruins of Kawanami Shipyard
- Uranosaki Post Office

== History ==
- October 1, 1930 - Opens for business.
- April 1, 1987 - Railways privatize and this station is inherited by JR Kyushu.
- April 1, 1988 - This station is inherited by Matsuura Railway.
