= Saga 2nd district =

- Parliamentary constituency for the Japanese House of Representatives
- Numbered map of Saga Prefecture single-member districts
- Prefecture: Saga
- Proportional District: Kyushu
- Electorate: 334,651

Current constituency
- Created: 1994
- Seats: One
- Party: LDP
- Representative: Yasushi Furukawa
- Municipalities: Cities of Kashima, Ogi, Imari, Karatsu, Ureshino, Takeo, and Taku. Districts of Fujitsu, Kishima, Higashimatsuura, and Nishimatsuura.

Saga 2nd district (佐賀県第2区, Saga-ken dai-niku or simply 佐賀2区, Saga-niku) is a single-member constituency of the House of Representatives in the national Diet of Japan located in Saga Prefecture.

== Areas covered ==
=== Since 2013 ===
- Kashima
- Ogi
- Imari
- Karatsu
- Ureshino
- Takeo
- Taku
- Fujitsu District
- Kishima District
- Higashimatsuura District
- Nishimatsuura District

=== 2002 - 2013 ===
- Kashima
- Fujitsu District
- Part of Kanzaki District
- Part of Kishima District
- Ogi District
- Saga District

=== 1994 - 2002 ===
- Kashima
- Taku
- Fujitsu District
- Part of Kishima District
- Ogi District
- Saga District

== List of representatives ==
Election	Representative	Party	Notes
1996	Masahiro Imamura	LDP	
2000	Masahiro Imamura	LDP	
2003	Masahiro Imamura	LDP	
2005	Masahiro Imamura	Independent	
2005	Masahiro Imamura	LDP	
2009	Hiroshi Ogushi	Democratic	
2012	Masahiro Imamura	LDP	
2014	Yasushi Furukawa	LDP	
2017	Hiroshi Ogushi	Kibō no Tō	
2017	Hiroshi Ogushi	Independent	
2021	Hiroshi Ogushi	CDP	
2024	Hiroshi Ogushi	CDP	
2026	Yasushi Furukawa	LDP	

== Election results ==
=== 2026 ===
2026
Party	Candidate	Votes	%	±%
LDP	Yasushi Furukawa	106,320	55.52	
Centrist Reform	Hiroshi Ogushi	85,185	44.48	
Registered electors		325,412		
Turnout			60.15	▲2.65
LDP gain from Centrist Reform				

=== 2024 ===
2024
Party	Candidate	Votes	%	±%
CDP	Hiroshi Ogushi	95,581	51.16	▼0.89
LDP	Yasushi Furukawa (Won PR seat)	76,554	40.97	▼6.98
JCP	Yusuke Inoue	7,596	4.07	N/A
Sanseitō	Yuya Shimohigoshi	7,108	3.80	New
Majority		19,735	10.19	
Registered electors		329,829		
Turnout			57.50	▼3.30
CDP hold				

=== 2021 ===
2021
Party	Candidate	Votes	%	±%
CDP	Hiroshi Ogushi	106,608	52.05	New
LDP	Yasushi Furukawa (Won PR seat)	98,224	47.95	▲1.41
Majority		8,384	4.10	
Registered electors		340,617		
Turnout			60.80	▼0.38
CDP hold				

=== 2017 ===
2017
Party	Candidate	Votes	%	±%
Kibō no Tō	Hiroshi Ogushi	105,921	49.74	New
LDP	Yasushi Furukawa (Won PR seat)	99,103	46.54	▼9.03
JCP	Hitoshi Ōmori	7,920	3.72	▼0.58
Majority		6,818	3.20	
Registered electors		353,654		
Turnout			61.18	
Kibō no Tō gain from LDP				

=== 2014 ===
2014
Party	Candidate	Votes	%	±%
LDP	Yasushi Furukawa	114,074	55.57	▲4.87
Democratic	Hiroshi Ogushi (Won PR seat)	82,383	40.13	▼5.15
JCP	Satomi Mikuriya	8,812	4.30	▲0.28
Majority		31,691	15.44	
Registered electors				
Turnout				
LDP hold				

=== 2012 ===
2012
Party	Candidate	Votes	%	±%
LDP	Masahiro Imamura	70,767	50.70	▲3.38
Democratic	Hiroshi Ogushi (Won PR seat)	63,208	45.28	▼6.13
JCP	Yasutoshi Kamimura	5,618	4.02	N/A
Majority		7,559	5.42	
Registered electors				
Turnout				
LDP gain from Democratic				

=== 2009 ===
2009
Party	Candidate	Votes	%	±%
Democratic	Hiroshi Ogushi	86,098	51.41	▲19.19
LDP	Masahiro Imamura (Won PR seat)	79,243	47.32	▲25.32
Happiness Realization	Tadaaki Makihara	2,119	1.27	New
Majority		6,855	4.09	
Registered electors				
Turnout				
Democratic gain from LDP				

=== 2005 ===
2005
Party	Candidate	Votes	%	±%
Independent	Masahiro Imamura	66,995	42.07	New
Democratic	Hiroshi Ogushi (Won PR seat)	51,299	32.22	N/A
LDP	Chiaki Dokai	35,039	22.00	▼60.44
JCP	Yasuo Ishimaru	5,900	3.71	▼13.85
Majority		15,696	9.85	
Registered electors				
Turnout				
Independent hold				

=== 2003 ===
2003
Party	Candidate	Votes	%	±%
LDP	Masahiro Imamura	107,522	82.44	▲20.48
JCP	Minoru Morota	22,898	17.56	▲12.61
Majority		84,624	64.88	
Registered electors				
Turnout				
LDP hold				

=== 2000 ===
2000
Party	Candidate	Votes	%	±%
LDP	Masahiro Imamura	87,240	61.96	▲6.13
Democratic	Hiroyasu Higuchi	27,929	19.84	N/A
Social Democratic	Hisahiro Shibata	15,890	11.29	New
JCP	Kazuaki Yamada	6,968	4.95	▼1.31
Liberal League	Yasuhiro Fukagawa	2,764	1.96	▲0.74
Majority		59,311	42.12	
Registered electors				
Turnout				
LDP hold				

=== 1996 ===
1996
Party	Candidate	Votes	%	±%
LDP	Masahiro Imamura	75,072	55.83	New
New Frontier	Toshihiko Yokoo	49,337	36.69	New
JCP	Akihiro Hirakawa	8,420	6.26	New
Liberal League	Hideyuki Nagata	1,643	1.22	New
Majority		25,735	19.14	
Registered electors				
Turnout				
LDP win (new seat)				
