= Masahiro Imamura =

Japanese politician (born 1947)

- 今村 雅弘
- Official portrait, 2007

Minister for Reconstruction
- In office 3 August 2016 – 26 April 2017
- Prime Minister: Shinzo Abe
- Preceded by: Tsuyoshi Takagi
- Succeeded by: Masayoshi Yoshino

Member of the House of Representatives
- In office 21 October 1996 – 9 October 2024
- Preceded by: Constituency established
- Succeeded by: Multi-member district
- Constituency: Saga 2nd (1996–2009); Kyushu PR (2009–2012); Saga 2nd (2012-2014); Kyushu PR (2014–2024)

Personal details
- Born: 25 January 1947 (age 79) Kashima, Saga, Japan
- Party: Liberal Democratic (before 2005; 2006–present)
- Other political affiliations: Independent (2005–2006)
- Education: University of Tokyo

Masahiro Imamura (今村 雅弘, Imamura Masahiro; born 25 January 1947) is a former Japanese politician of the Liberal Democratic Party who served as a member of the House of Representatives in the Diet (national legislature).

== Overview ==
A native of Kashima, Saga and a graduate of the University of Tokyo, he was elected to the House of Representatives for the first time in 1996 after working for the Japan Railways Group.

== Career ==
- Japanese National Railways (employee of Kyusyu Railway Co. after the privatization)
- State Minister of Agriculture, Forestry, and Fisheries
- Parliamentary Vice-Minister of Foreign Affairs
- Parliamentary Vice-Minister of Land, Infrastructure, Transport and Tourism
- Chairman, Committee on Land, Infrastructure, Transport and Tourism
- Chairman, Special Committee on Audit and Oversight of Administration
- Chairman, Regional Government Promotion Headquarters
- Minister of reconstruction for disaster-hit regions

== Yasukuni visits and right wing affiliations ==
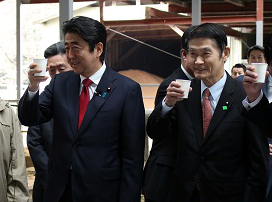
Imamura with Shinzō Abe (in Naraha Town, Futaba District, Fukushima Prefecture on 8 April 2017)

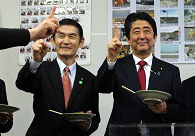
Imamura with Shinzō Abe (in Namie Town, Futaba District, Fukushima Prefecture on 8 April 2017)

On 11 August 2016, one week after joining Prime Minister Shinzō Abe's cabinet as reconstruction minister for disaster-hit regions, Masahiro Imamura visited the controversial Yasukuni shrine.

In late 2016, hours after Abe and Defense Minister Tomomi Inada met President Barack Obama in Hawaii and Abe expressed 'everlasting condolences' for the casualties of the 1941 attack on Pearl Harbor in Hawaii, Imamura again visited the shrine. The visit garnered "a sharp rebuke from Beijing". Imamura said his visit had “nothing to do with” Abe's trip and the timing was “a coincidence”, saying he "wished to express gratitude and prayed for Japan’s peace and prosperity".

Imamura is a member of key right-wing Diet groups:

- Nippon Kaigi (revisionist lobby)
- Pro-Yasukuni Alliance
- Conference of young parliamentarians supporting the idea that the Yasukuni Shrine is a true national interest and desire for peace
- Japan Rebirth (Sosei Nippon)
- Shinto Seiji Renmei Kokkai Giin Kondankai (Sinseiren, Shinto Political League - Shinto fundamentalism)

Ahead of the 2012 elections, Imamura positioned himself in favor of:

- changing the Article 9 of the Constitution of Japan, which prohibits the exercise of the right of collective self-defense
- considering the nuclear armament of Japan
- re-operating the nuclear power plants that meet the new standards of the Nuclear Regulatory Commission

Masahiro Imamura, who holds rather radical positions about nuclear issues, was until 26 April 2017 the minister in charge of coping with the aftermath of the Fukushima nuclear power plant disaster. He was forced to step down over a remark that he had made the previous day suggesting that it had been better that the 2011 earthquake and tsunami had hit the Tohoku region than the Tokyo region. He has been replaced by Masayoshi Yoshino who had been chairman of the special House of Representatives committee on Tohoku reconstruction.
