= 2007 Saga gubernatorial election =

Election for Governor of Saga Prefecture

- 8 April 2007
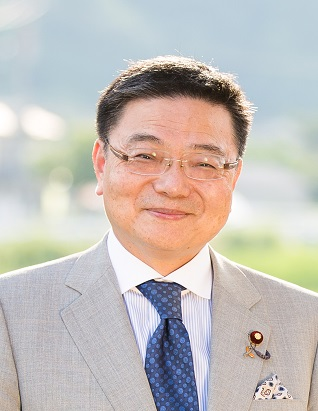
Nominee	Yasushi Furukawa	Masakatsu Hirabayashi
Party	Independent	JCP
Popular vote	332,785	87,158
Governor before election
Yasushi Furukawa
Independent
Elected Governor
Yasushi Furukawa
Independent

A gubernatorial election was held on 8 April 2007 to elect the Governor of Saga Prefecture. Incumbent Yasushi Furukawa was re-elected.

== Candidates ==
- Yasushi Furukawa – incumbent Governor of Saga Prefecture, age 48
- Masakatsu Hirabayashi (平林正勝, Hirabayashi Masakatsu) – Communist Party Committee Chairman, age 59

== Results ==
2007 Saga gubernational election
Party	Candidate	Votes	%	±%
Independent	Yasushi Furukawa (incumbent)	332,785		
JCP	Masakatsu Hirabayashi	87,158		
