= Imari, Saga =

Imari 伊万里市
- City
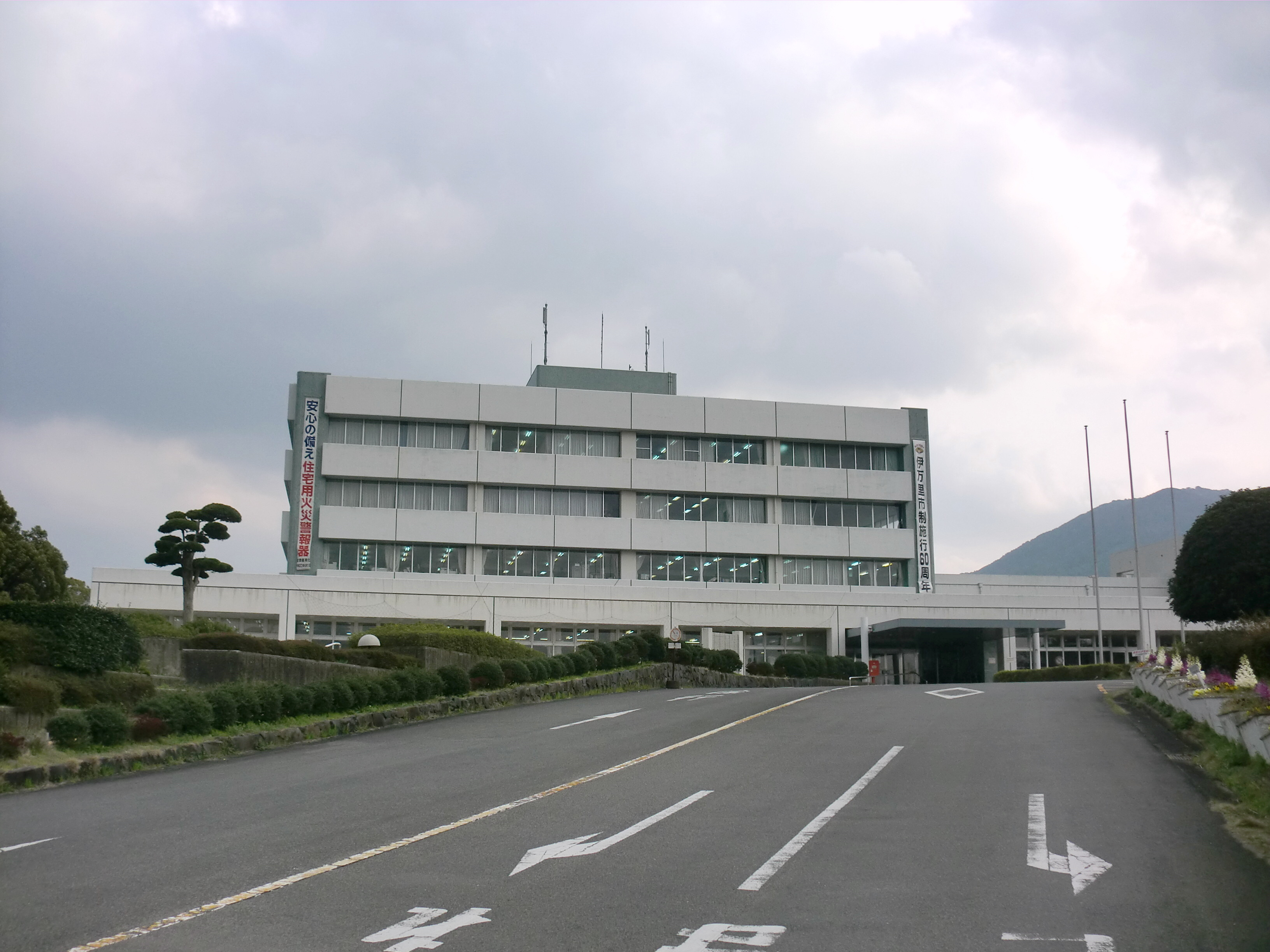
- Imari City Hall

- Flag Emblem
- Interactive map of Imari
- Location in Japan
- Coordinates: 33°15′53″N 129°52′51″E
- Country: Japan
- Region: Kyushu
- Prefecture: Saga

Government
  - Mayor: Hironobu Fukaura <深浦 弘信> (from April 2018)

Area
  - Total: 255.26 km^{2} (98.56 sq mi)

Population (June 1, 2024)
  - Total: 51,875
  - Density: 203.22/km^{2} (526.35/sq mi)
- Time zone: UTC+09:00 (JST)
- City hall address: 1355-1 Tachibana-chō, Imari-shi, Saga-ken 848-8501
- Climate: Cfa
- Website: Official website
- Symbols
- Flower: Azalea
- Tree: Podocarpaceae

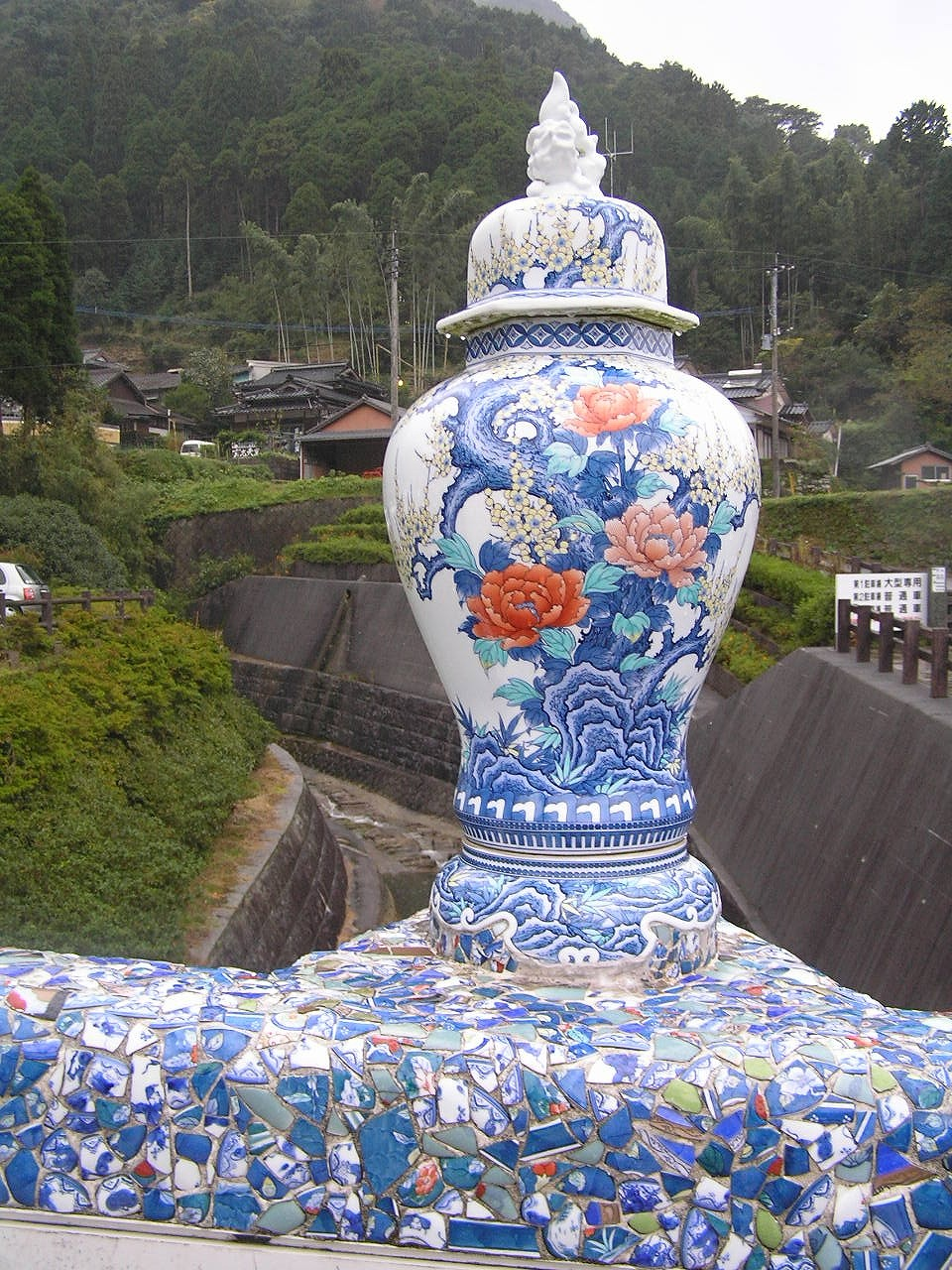
Nabeshimayaki Okawachiyama

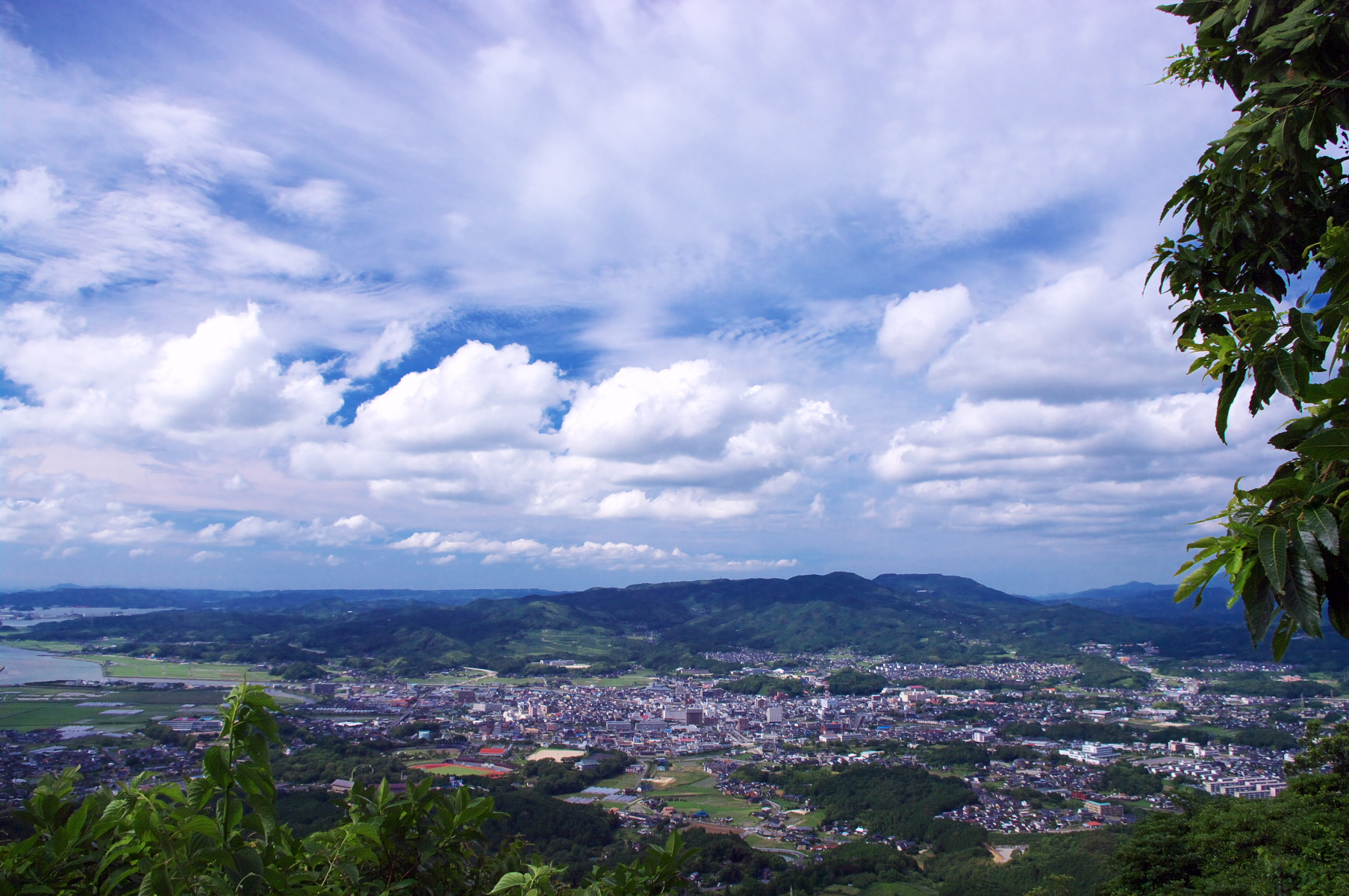
Panorama of Imari

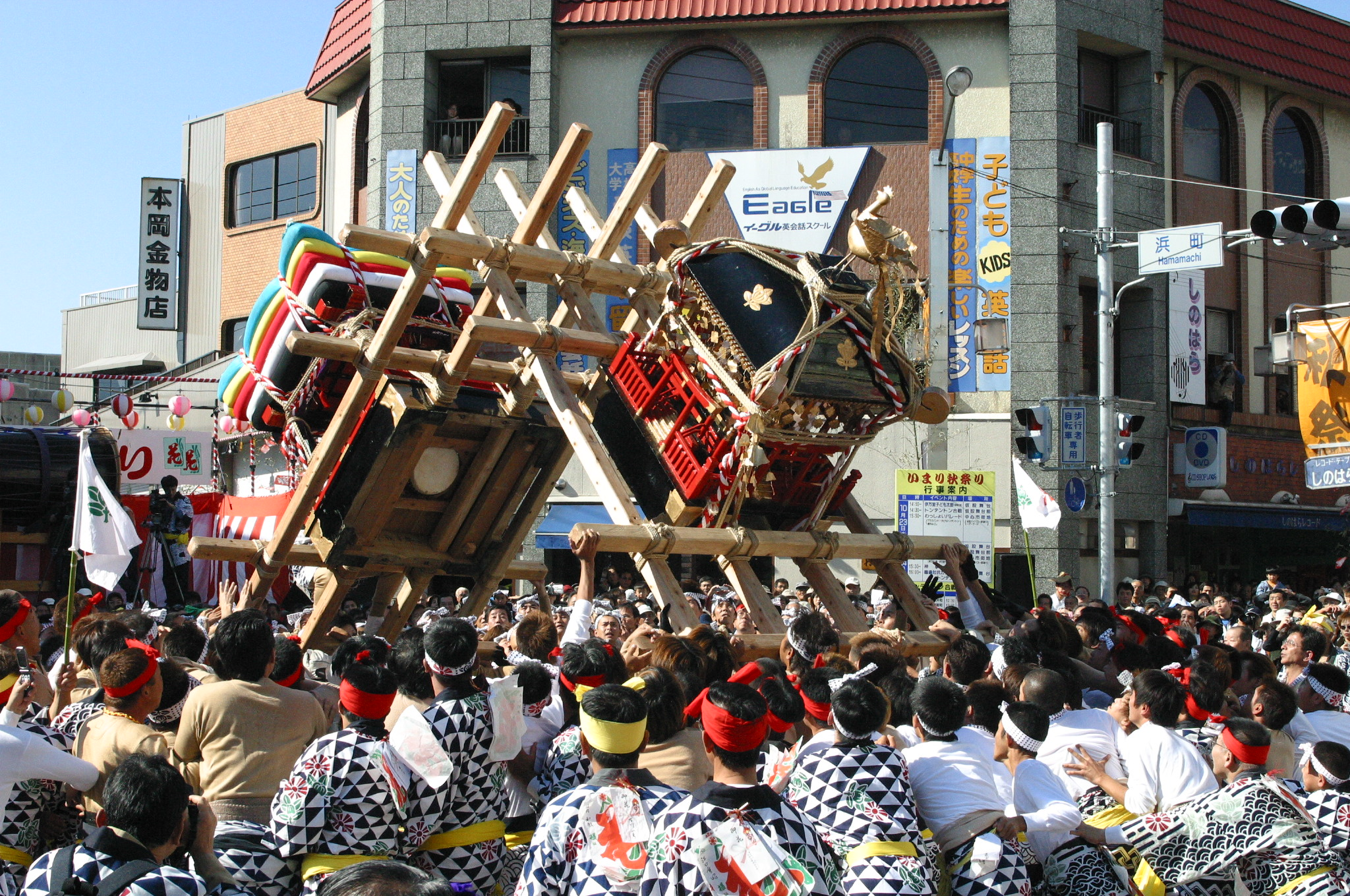
Imari Ton-Ton Festival

Imari (伊万里市, Imari-shi; Japanese pronunciation: [í.mä̀.ɾʲì, ì.mä́.ɾʲí.ɕì]) is a city located in Saga Prefecture on the island of Kyushu, Japan. As of 1 June 2024, the city had an estimated population of 51,875 in 23,874 households, and a population density of 200 persons per km^{2}. The total area of the city is 255.26 km^{2} (98.56 sq mi). Imari is most notable because of Imari porcelain, which is the European collectors' name for Japanese porcelain wares made in the town of Arita, Saga Prefecture. The porcelain was exported from the port of Imari specifically for the European export trade.

== Geography ==
Imari is located in the western part of Saga Prefecture, approximately 50 kilometers were of the prefectural capital at Saga. The urban center is located around the mouth of the Imari River.

- Mountains: Mt. Hachiman (764 m), Mt. Seira (599 m), Mt. Eboshi (597 m)
- Rivers: Matsuura River, Imari River, Hata River, Kurōtake River, Arita River

=== Adjoining municipalities ===
Nagasaki Prefecture

- Matsuura
- Sasebo

Saga Prefecture

- Arita
- Karatsu
- Takeo

=== Climate ===
Imari has a humid subtropical climate (Köppen Cfa) characterized by warm summers and cool winters with light to no snowfall. The average annual temperature in Imari is 15.7 °C. The average annual rainfall is 1864 mm with September as the wettest month. The temperatures are highest on average in August, at around 26.7 °C, and lowest in January, at around 5.4 °C.

Climate data for Imari (1991−2020 normals, extremes 1977−present)
Month	Jan	Feb	Mar	Apr	May	Jun	Jul	Aug	Sep	Oct	Nov	Dec	Year
Record high °C (°F)	20.2 (68.4)	22.4 (72.3)	25.6 (78.1)	29.9 (85.8)	32.7 (90.9)	36.0 (96.8)	36.8 (98.2)	39.8 (103.6)	36.9 (98.4)	32.6 (90.7)	28.3 (82.9)	24.0 (75.2)	39.8 (103.6)
Mean daily maximum °C (°F)	9.8 (49.6)	11.2 (52.2)	14.6 (58.3)	19.7 (67.5)	24.1 (75.4)	26.7 (80.1)	30.5 (86.9)	31.8 (89.2)	28.0 (82.4)	23.3 (73.9)	17.7 (63.9)	12.2 (54.0)	20.8 (69.5)
Daily mean °C (°F)	5.4 (41.7)	6.4 (43.5)	9.5 (49.1)	14.2 (57.6)	18.6 (65.5)	22.2 (72.0)	26.4 (79.5)	27.2 (81.0)	23.3 (73.9)	17.9 (64.2)	12.4 (54.3)	7.3 (45.1)	15.9 (60.6)
Mean daily minimum °C (°F)	1.2 (34.2)	1.7 (35.1)	4.5 (40.1)	8.9 (48.0)	13.6 (56.5)	18.6 (65.5)	23.3 (73.9)	23.7 (74.7)	19.6 (67.3)	13.3 (55.9)	7.6 (45.7)	2.9 (37.2)	11.6 (52.8)
Record low °C (°F)	−5.4 (22.3)	−5.3 (22.5)	−3.6 (25.5)	−1.0 (30.2)	4.0 (39.2)	8.7 (47.7)	15.6 (60.1)	16.7 (62.1)	8.6 (47.5)	2.1 (35.8)	−1.6 (29.1)	−4.5 (23.9)	−5.4 (22.3)
Average precipitation mm (inches)	78.6 (3.09)	93.8 (3.69)	148.6 (5.85)	188.2 (7.41)	197.2 (7.76)	355.6 (14.00)	367.9 (14.48)	272.0 (10.71)	224.1 (8.82)	105.0 (4.13)	107.4 (4.23)	83.6 (3.29)	2,221.8 (87.47)
Average precipitation days (≥ 1.0 mm)	9.4	9.0	10.9	10.0	9.4	13.4	13.1	11.0	10.0	7.2	9.1	9.2	121.7
Mean monthly sunshine hours	98.6	118.9	157.9	182.7	193.2	122.0	159.0	188.5	155.3	178.7	135.4	108.6	1,798.8
Source: JMA

=== Demographics ===
Per Japanese census data, the population of Imari is as shown below.

Historical population
Year	Pop.	±%
1940	60,539	—
1950	82,319	+36.0%
1960	78,397	−4.8%
1970	61,561	−21.5%
1980	61,243	−0.5%
1990	60,882	−0.6%
2000	59,143	−2.9%
2010	57,161	−3.4%
2020	52,629	−7.9%

== History ==
The area of Imari was part of ancient Hizen Province. On August 15, 1281 the 2nd Mongol invasion fleet retreated into Imari Bay and was destroyed here by Kamikaze typhoon. During the Edo period, Imari was part of the Saga Domain. During the Edo period this region flourished due to the export of ceramics and porcelain. High quality goods presented to Shōgun and the Imperial Court were produced in what is now called Ōkawachiyama and were styled Nabeshima ware. From the Meiji period to 1955 coal was also a major export.

Following the Meiji restoration, the town of Imari and the villages of Higashiyamashiro, Kurokawa, Makishima, Matsuura, Minamihata, Niri, Nishiyamashiro, Ōdake, Ōkawa, Ōkawachi and Ōtsubo were established with the creation of the modern municipalities system. On February 16, 1901 Ōdake Village was renamed Hatatsu Village. On December 10, 1928 Makishima Village was incorporated into Imari Town. Nishiyamashiro was raised to town status on April 1, 1936 becoming Yamashiro Town. On December 8, 1943 the villages of Ōkawachi and Ōtsubo were incorporated into Imari Town. The towns of Imari and Yamashiro, and the villages of Higashiyamashiro, Kurokawa, Hatatsu, Minamihata, Ōkawa, Matsuura, and Niri were merged on April 1, 1954 to create Imari City.

== Government ==
Imari has a mayor-council form of government with a directly elected mayor and a unicameral city council of 21 members. Imari contributes two members to the Saga Prefectural Assembly. In terms of national politics, the city is part of the Saga 2nd district of the lower house of the Diet of Japan.

== Economy ==
While Imari is best known as a center of the ceramics industry, there is an industrial park near the Port of Imari. Agriculture is thriving, including rice, green onions, mandarin oranges, pears, and grapes.

=== The Imari Pear ===
Imari is the largest Japanese pear producing center in western Japan. The cultivation of the Japanese pear from Imari (Imari pears (伊万里梨, Imari nashi)), which originated in the Ōkawa area 100 years ago, has spread out to the Minamihata area and other areas of the city. Today, they are produced over about 350 hectares of land, and their quantity of production was about 4800 tons per year as of 2007. Ōkawa originally had little rice fields, but in 1906 this led the chairman of the Ōkawa Junior Chamber of Commerce, Takeji Fujita and 11 other people to spearhead the reclamation of forest lands and the cultivation of Japanese pears as a cash crop in Ōkawa. Since then the production and the crop acreage of Imari nashi have increased. According to the latest municipal statistics, the production is the fifth and the acreage is the third in the nation. The characteristics of Imari nashi are juiciness and crispness. Thanks to the adoption of light sensor systems for fruit sorting, only those which are of excellent quality can be selected and are shipped to Kantō, Kansai, and Kyūshū districts. Recently export to China has started and been promoted. The main brands of Imari nashi are Kosui, Hosui, and Niitaka. The most produced is Kosui, but Hosui is the most popular brand of the three.

== Education ==
Imari has 13 public elementary schools and six public junior high schools operated by the city government, and one public high schools operated by the Saga Prefectural Board of Education. The prefecture also operates a special education school for the handicapped. There is also one vocational training school, the Imari College of Nursing.

== Transport ==
=== Railway ===
JR Kyushu - Chikuhi Line

- ■ Komanaki - Ōkawano - Hizen-Nagano - Momonokawa - Kanaishihara - Kami-Imari - Imari

Matsuura Railway - Nishi-Kyūshū Line

- Kanatake - Kawahigashi - Imari - Higashi-Yamashiro - Sato - Kusuku - Naruishi - Kubara - Haze - Uranosaki - Fukushimaguchi

=== Highways ===
- Nishi-Kyūshū Expressway
- National Route 202
- National Route 204
- National Route 498

=== Seaports ===
- Port of Imari is a medium size port which receives ocean ships of various types, including container ships, dry bulk ships, cruise ships...etc. . It is also the location of the main shipyard of Namura Shipbuilding Co. Ltd., a large Osaka based shipbuilding and repair company which also owns another large ship repair firm further southwest in Sasebo, i.e. Sasebo Heavy Industries.

== Sister cities ==
- Darien, China, friendship city since May 2007

== Local attractions ==
- Ōkawachiyama, 'The Village of the Secret Kilns', used to be the home of the Nabeshima clan kilns, with masters such as Hatase Buemon and Sakaida Kakiemon.

=== Festivals ===
The Imari Ton-Ten-Ton Festival is held annually for three days from October 22 to 24, beginning at the Imari Shrine in Imari City. The festival is well known as one of the three great fighting festivals of Japan.

== Notable people from Imari ==
- Fujiko (actress)
- Tatsuo Ikeda - avant-garde artist
- Sayuri Katayama - singer
- Kyohei Maeyama - Footballer for Blaublitz Akita
- Ryosuke Mizumachi - Basketball player for Akita Northern Happinets
- Taichiro Morinaga - Morinaga & Co founder
- Yōsuke Takasu - baseball player
- Masayuki Tanaka - singer
