= Yasushi Furukawa (politician) =

Japanese politician (born 1958)

- 古川 康
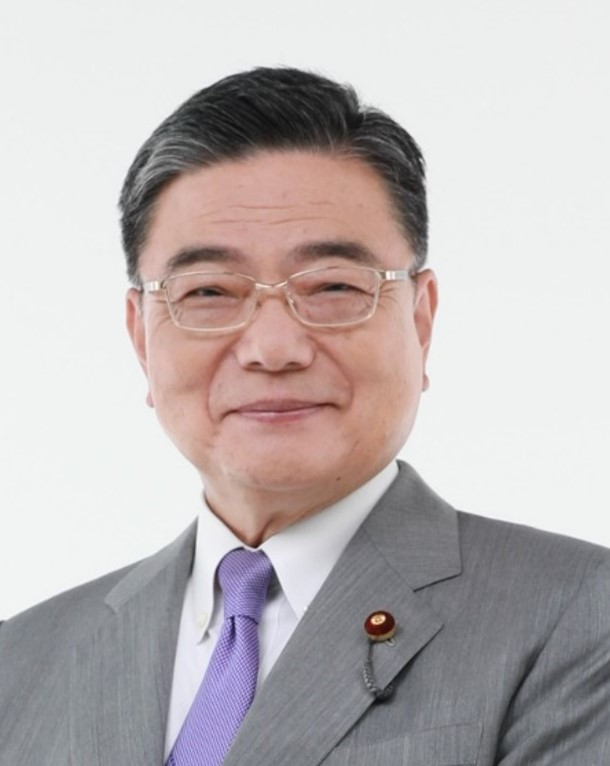
- Official portrait, 2024

Member of the House of Representatives
- Incumbent
- Assumed office 17 December 2014
- Preceded by: Masahiro Imamura
- Constituency: Saga 2nd (2014–2017); Kyushu PR (2017–2026); Saga 2nd (2026–present)

Governor of Saga Prefecture
- In office 23 April 2003 – 25 November 2014
- Monarch: Akihito
- Preceded by: Isamu Imoto
- Succeeded by: Yoshinori Yamaguchi

Personal details
- Born: 15 July 1958 (age 68) Karatsu, Saga, Japan
- Party: Liberal Democratic
- Children: Aoi Furukawa
- Education: University of Tokyo

Yasushi Furukawa (古川 康, Furukawa Yasushi; born 15 July 1958) is a Japanese politician and current member of the House of Representatives. He was previously the governor of Saga Prefecture from 2003 to 2014. A native of Karatsu, Saga, he graduated from the University of Tokyo in 1982 and entered the Ministry of Home Affairs upon graduation.
