= Isamu Imoto =

Japanese politician (1925–2018)

- 井本 勇

Governor of Saga Prefecture
- In office 23 April 1991 – 22 April 2003
- Monarch: Akihito
- Preceded by: Kumao Katsuki
- Succeeded by: Yasushi Furukawa

Personal details
- Born: 17 September 1925 Karatsu, Saga, Japan
- Died: 23 April 2018 (aged 92) Saga Prefecture, Japan

Isamu Imoto (井本 勇, Imoto Isamu; 17 September 1925 – 23 April 2018) was a Japanese politician who served as Governor of Saga Prefecture from 1991 to 2003.

== Biography ==
Isamu Imoto was born on 17 September 1925. After graduating from Takeo Junior High School (now Saga Prefectural Takeo High School), he was hired by the Saga Prefectural Office in 1947. After serving as Deputy Director of Economic Affairs and Director of General Affairs, he served two terms as Deputy Governor starting in 1982. He was nominated by the Liberal Democratic, Democratic, New Komeito, and Socialist Parties, and served as governor for three 4-year terms starting in 1991. During his time as governor, he promoted the maintenance of the historical park of the Yoshinogari Ruins, the holding of the World Expo, and the opening of Saga Airport. Every election he won, he won with more than 300,000 votes. He retired in 2003 without appointing his successor. On 3 November, he received the Order of the Rising Sun. He died on 23 April 2018 aged 92.
