= Timeline of snowflake research =

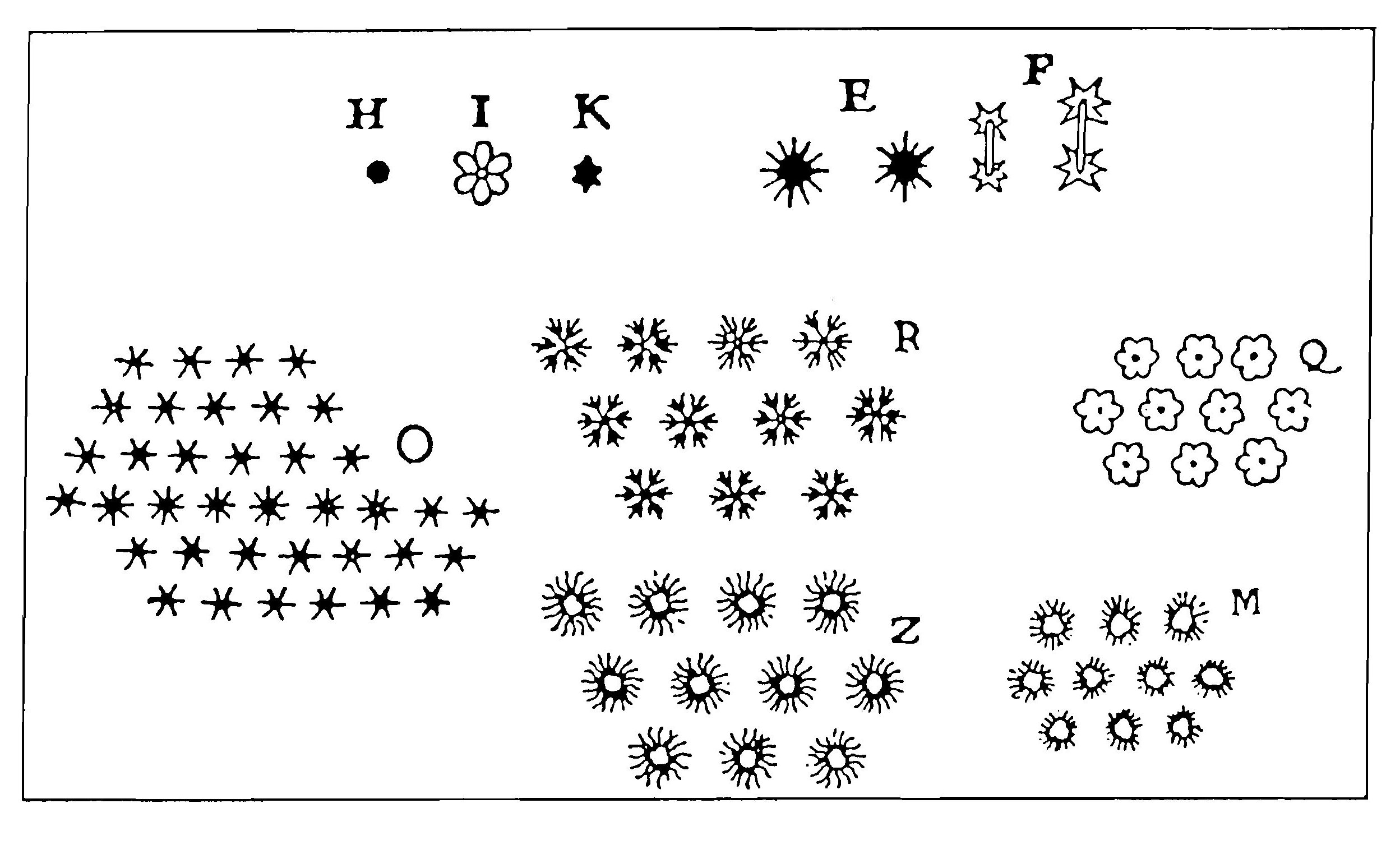
Sketch of snow crystals by René Descartes

The hexagonal snowflake, a crystalline formation of ice, has intrigued people throughout history. This is a chronology of interest and research into snowflakes. Artists, philosophers, and scientists have wondered at their shape, recorded them by hand or in photographs, and attempted to recreate hexagonal snowflakes.

Wilson Alwyn Bentley (February 9, 1865 – December 23, 1931), also known as Snowflake Bentley, was an American meteorologist and photographer, who was the first known person to take detailed photographs of snowflakes and record their features.[1] He perfected a process of catching flakes on black velvet in such a way that their images could be captured before they either melted or sublimated.

== Chronological list ==
=== BC to 1900 ===
- 150 BCE or 135 BCE - Han Ying (韓嬰) compiled the anthology Han shi waizhuan, which includes a passage that contrasts the pentagonal symmetry of flowers with the hexagonal symmetry of snow. This is discussed further in the Imperial Readings of the Taiping Era.
- 1250 - Albertus Magnus offers what is believed to be the oldest detailed description of snow.
- 1555 - Olaus Magnus publishes the earliest snowflake diagrams in Historia de gentibus septentrionalibus.
- 1611 - Johannes Kepler, in Strenaseu De Nive Sexangula, attempts to explain why snow crystals are hexagonal.
- 1637 - René Descartes' Discourse on the Method includes hexagonal diagrams and a study for the crystallization process and conditions for snowflakes.
- 1660 - Erasmus Bartholinus, in his De figura nivis dissertatio, includes sketches of snow crystals.
- 1665 - Robert Hooke observes snow crystals under magnification in Micrographia.
- 1675 - Friedrich Martens, a German physician, catalogues 24 types of snow crystal.
- 1681 - Donato Rossetti categorizes snow crystals in La figura della neve.
- 1778 - Dutch theologian Johannes Florentius Martinet diagrams precise sketches of snow crystals.
- 1796 - Shiba Kōkan publishes sketches of ice crystals under a microscope.
- 1820 - William Scoresby's An account of the Arteic Regions includes snow crystals by type.
- 1832 - Doi Toshitsura describes and diagrams 86 types of snowflake (雪華図説).
- 1837 - Suzuki Bokushi (鈴木牧之) publishes Hokuetsu Seppu.
- 1840 - Doi Toshitsura expands his categories to include 97 types.
- 1855 - James Glaisher publishes detailed sketches of snow crystals under a microscope.
- 1864 - Frances E. Chickering publishes Cloud Crystals - a Snow-Flake Album.
- 1870 - Adolf Erik Nordenskiöld identifies "cryoconite holes."
- 1872 - John Tyndall publishes The Forms of Water in Clouds and Rivers, Ice and Glaciers.
- 1891 - Friedrich Umlauft publishes Das Luftmeer.
- 1893 - Richard Neuhauss photographs a snowflake under a microscope, titled Schneekrystalle.
- 1894 - A. A. Sigson photographs snowflakes under a microscope.

=== 1901 to 2000 ===
- 1901 - Wilson Bentley publishes a series of photographs of individual snowflakes in the Monthly Weather Review.
- 1903 - Svante Arrhenius describes crystallization process in Lehrbuch der Kosmischen Physik.
- 1904 - Helge von Koch discover the fractal curves to be a mathematical description of snowflakes.
- 1931 - Wilson Bentley and William Jackson Humphreys publish Snow Crystals
- 1936 - Ukichiro Nakaya creates snow crystals and charts the relationship between temperature and water vapor saturation, later called the Nakaya Diagram.
- 1938 - Ukichiro Nakaya publishes Snow (雪)
- 1949 - Ukichiro Nakaya publishes Research of snow (雪の研究, Yuki no kenkyu)
- 1952 - Marcel R. de Quervain et al. define ten major types of snow crystals, including hail and graupel in IUGG for the Swiss Federal Institute for Snow and Avalanche Research.
- 1954 - Harvard University Press publishes Ukichiro Nakaya's Snow Crystals: Natural and Artificial.
- 1960 - Teisaku Kobayashi (小林禎作, Kobayashi Teisaku), verifies and improves the Nakaya Diagram with the Kobayashi Diagram.
- 1962 - Cyoji Magono (孫野長治, Magono Cyōji) describes meteorological sorting of snow crystal types in clouds.
- 1979 - Toshio Kuroda (黒田登志雄, Kuroda Toshio) and Rolf Lacmann, of the Braunschweig University of Technology, publish Growth Mechanism of Ice from Vapour Phase and its Growth Forms.
- 1983 August - Astronauts make snow crystals in orbit on the Space Shuttle Challenger during mission STS-8.
- 1988 - Norihiko Fukuta (福田矩彦, Fukuta Norihiko) et al. make artificial snow crystals in an updraft, confirming the Nakaya Diagram.

=== 2001 and after ===
- 2002 - Kazuhiko Hiramatsu (平松和彦, Hiramatsu Kazuhiko) devises a simple snow crystal growth observatory apparatus using a PET bottle cooled by dry ice in an expanded polystyrene box.
- 2004 September - Akio Murai (村井昭夫, Murai Akio) invented the apparatus named lit. Murai-method Artificial Snow Crystal producer (Murai式人工雪結晶生成装置) which makes various shape of artificial snow crystals per pre-setting conditions meeting to Nakaya diagram by vapor generator and its cooling Peltier effect element.
- 2008 December - Yoshinori Furukawa (吉川義純, FurukawaYoshinori) demonstrates conditional snow crystal growth in space, in Solution Crystallization Observation Facility (SCOF) on the JEM (Kibō), remotely controlled from Tsukuba Space Center of JAXA.

== Sources cited ==
- Omolara Olowoyeye. "DUJS online, The history of the science of snowflakes" (PDF). Dartmouth College. Archived from the original (PDF) on 2011-07-16.
- "雪：冬に咲く華(Yuki: Fuyu ni saku hana)" [Snow: Blooming flower in winter] (PDF) (in Japanese). National Diet Library.
- "今日も星日和(kyomo hoshi biyori)" [Goodya with Stars, today too] (in Japanese).
- "雪研究の歴史(Yuki kenkyu no rekishi), year BC 150 to 1988" [History of research for snow] (in Japanese). acha's bookshelf. Slide down "Scrollbar" 50-60% to see ;

== See also ==
- Snowflakes
- Ice crystal
- Snow science
