= 13 Assassins =

13 Assassins may refer to:

- 13 Assassins (1963 film), a Japanese film directed by Eiichi Kudo
- 13 Assassins (2010 film), a Japanese film directed by Takashi Miike
