= Sekka =

Sekka may refer to:

- El Sekka El Hadid SC, an Egyptian football club based in Cairo, Egypt
- Sekka Zusetsu, a figure collection by Doi Toshitsura
- Johnny Sekka (1934–2006), Senegalese-born Gambian actor
- Kamisaka Sekka (1866-1942), Japanese artist

== See also ==
- Seka (actress)
- Sekkan (摂関)
