= Hokuriku region =

Subregion of Chūbu, Japan

Coordinates: 37°54′58″N 139°02′11″E

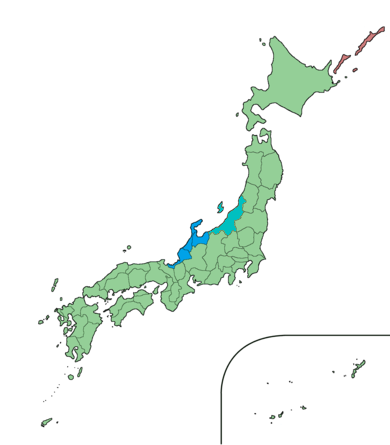
Hokuriku subregion with Niigata

The Hokuriku region (北陸地方, Hokuriku chihō) is located in the northwestern part of Honshu, the main island of Japan. It lies along the Sea of Japan and is part of the larger Chūbu region. It is almost equivalent to the former Koshi Province and Hokurikudō area in pre-modern Japan.

From the Heian period until the Edo period, the region was a core recipient of population, and grew to be proportionately much larger than it is today, despite the rural character; in modern times, its population has remained consistent, with most urban growth in the 20th century instead taking place in Kanto, Chūkyō, and Kansai. The Hokuriku region is also known for traditional culture that originated from elsewhere that has been long lost along the Taiheiyō Belt.

The Hokuriku region includes the four prefectures of Ishikawa, Fukui, Niigata and Toyama, although Niigata is sometimes included as an addition rather than being one of the core prefectures. It is similar to the following region definitions:

- Hokushin'etsu (北信越): includes both the Hokuriku and Shin'etsu regions
- Kōshin'etsu (甲信越): includes Niigata, Nagano and Yamanashi prefectures
- Shin'etsu (信越): includes Niigata and Nagano prefectures

== Major cities ==
The major population centers of Hokuriku are:

- Jōetsu, Nagaoka (special cities)
- Kanazawa, Toyama, Fukui (core cities)
- Niigata (designated city)

Of these, Niigata is the largest with a population of over 800,000.

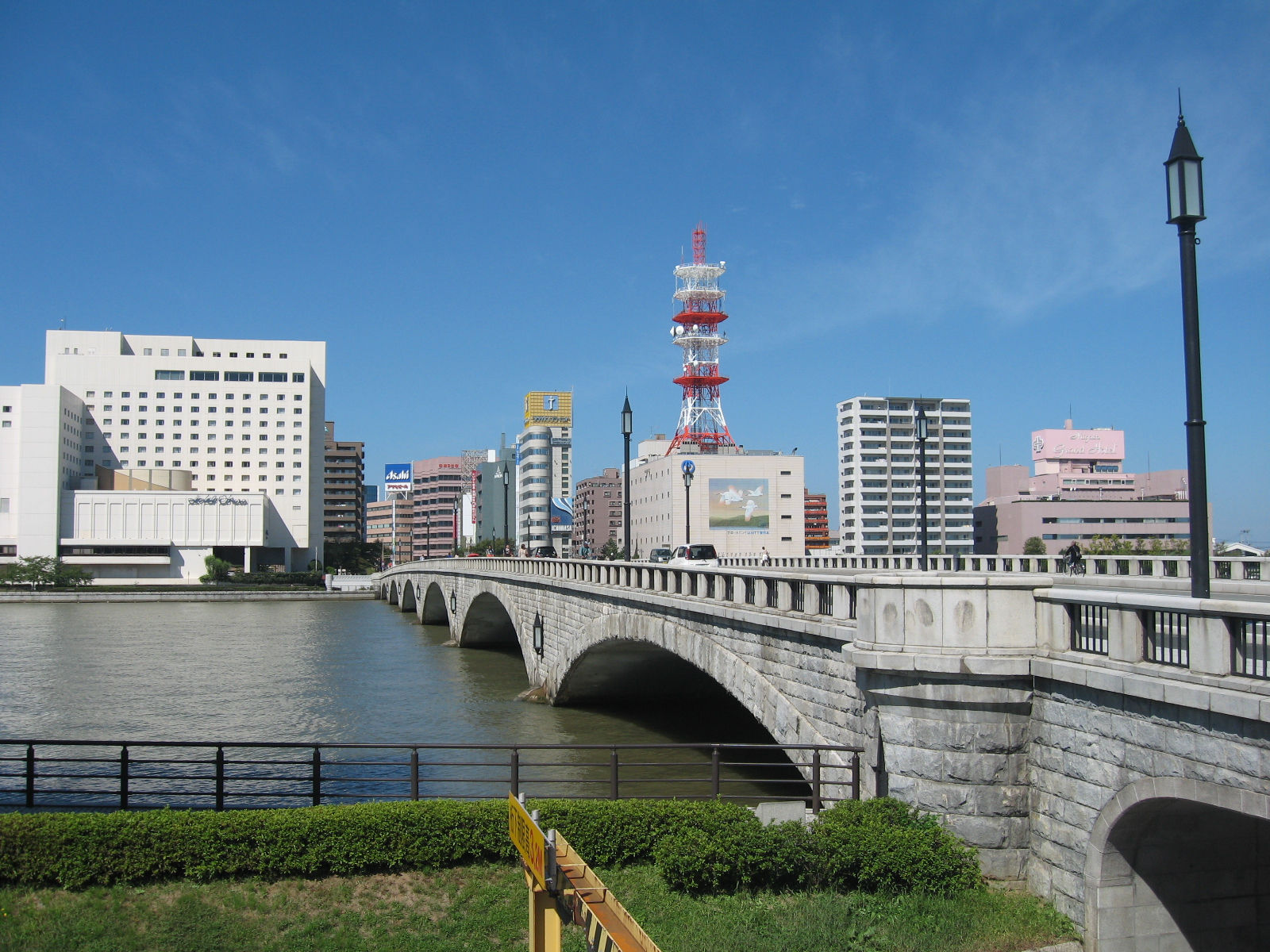
Niigata City

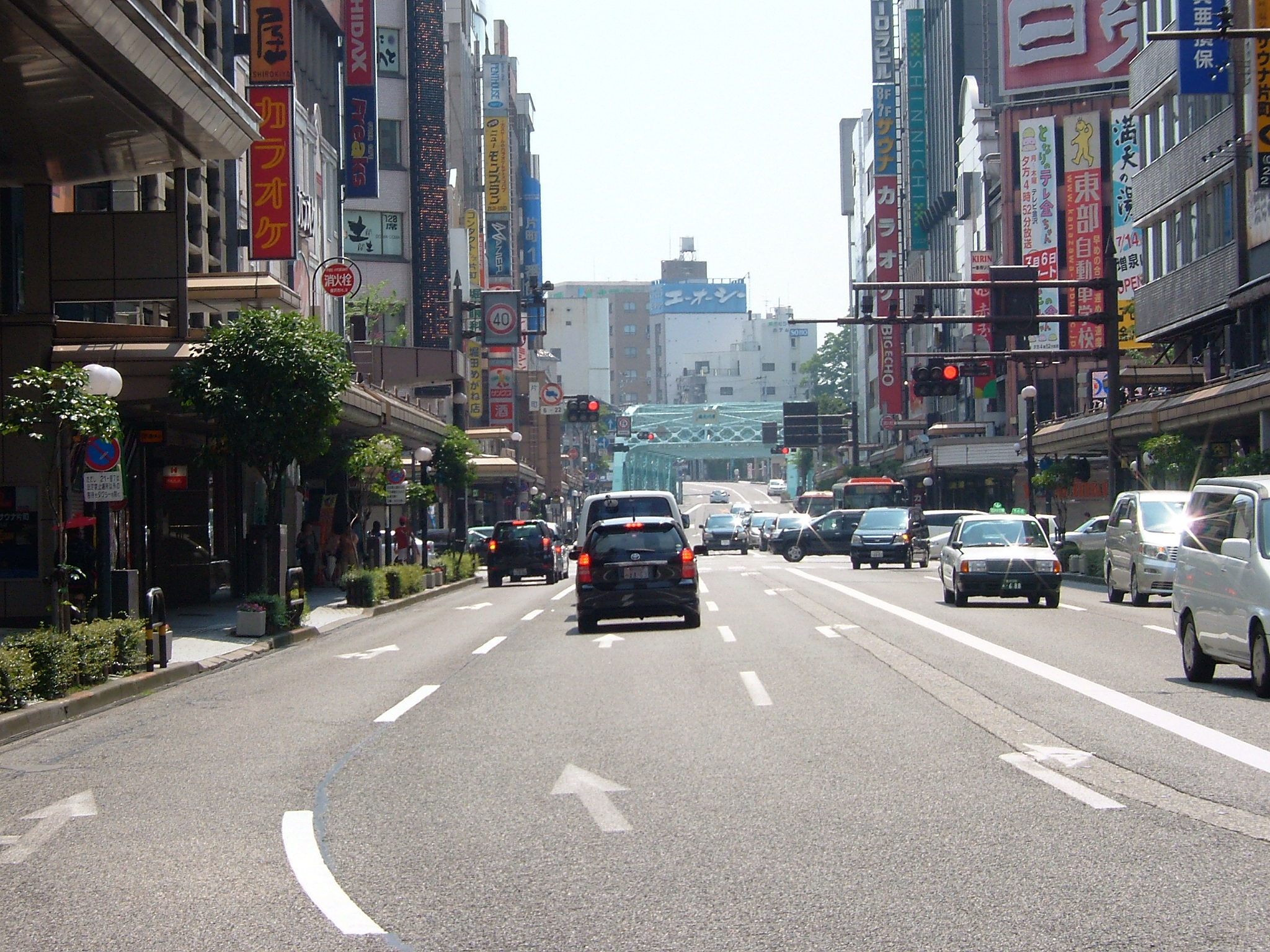
Kanazawa City

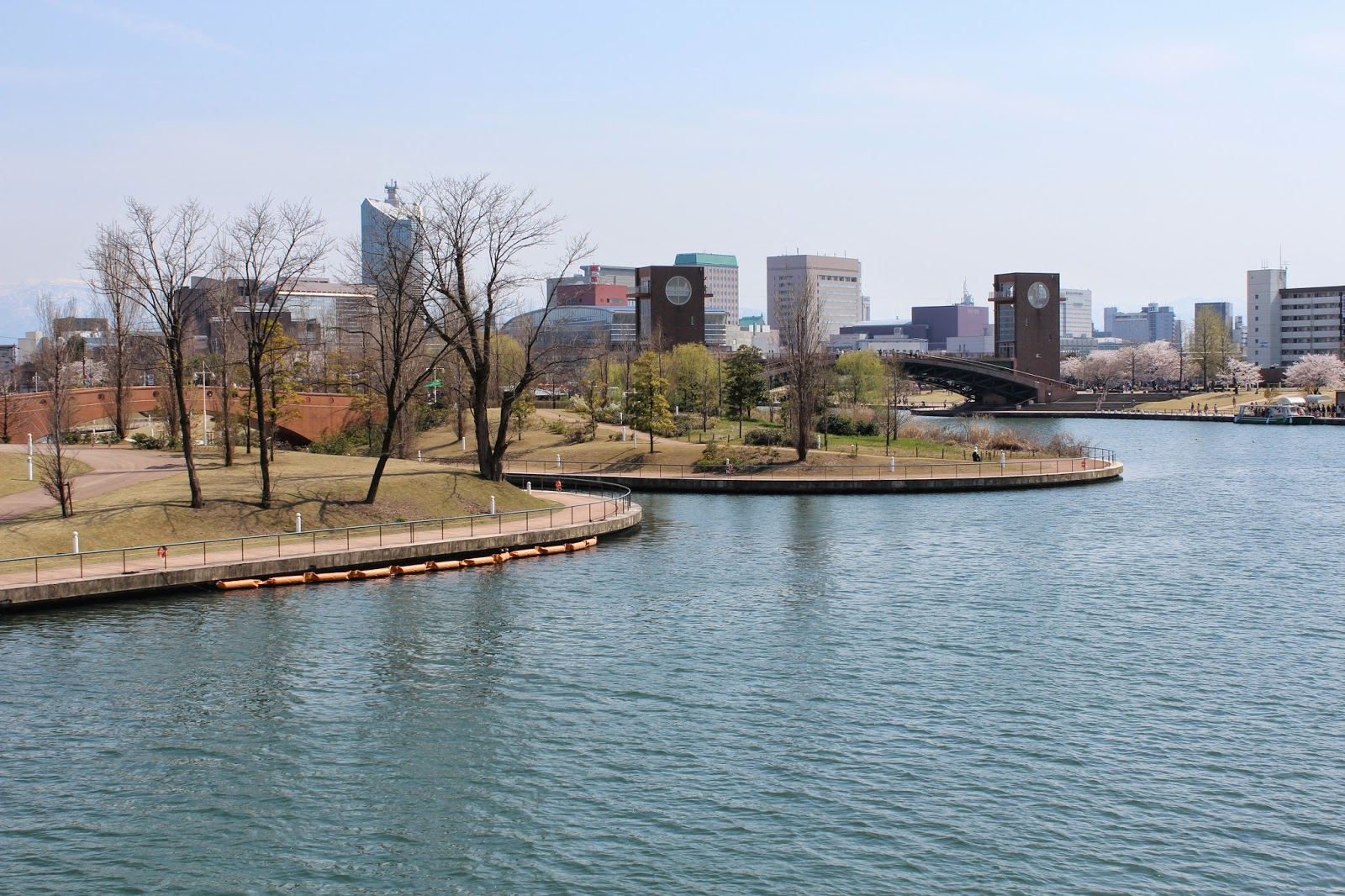
Toyama City

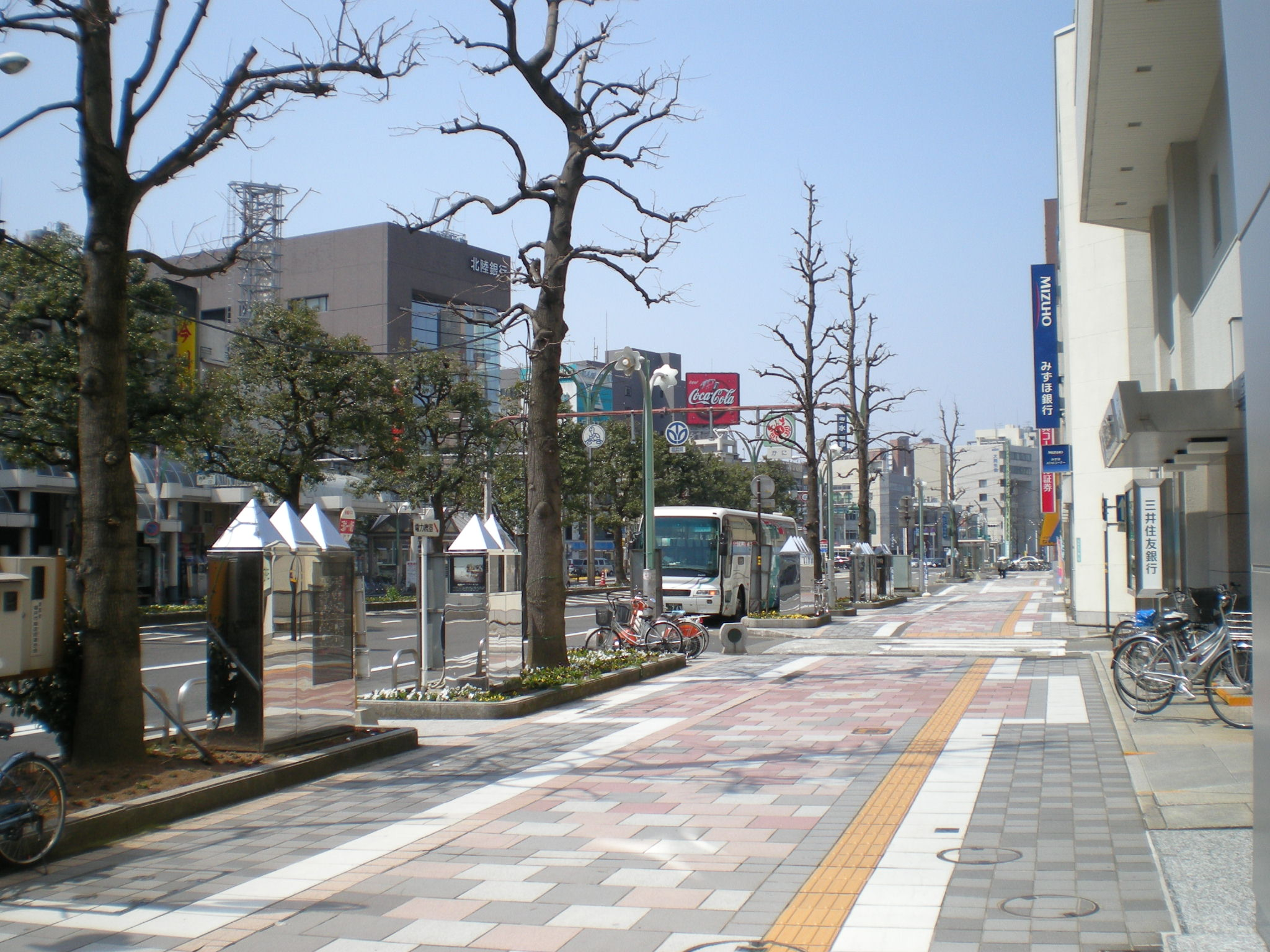
Fukui City

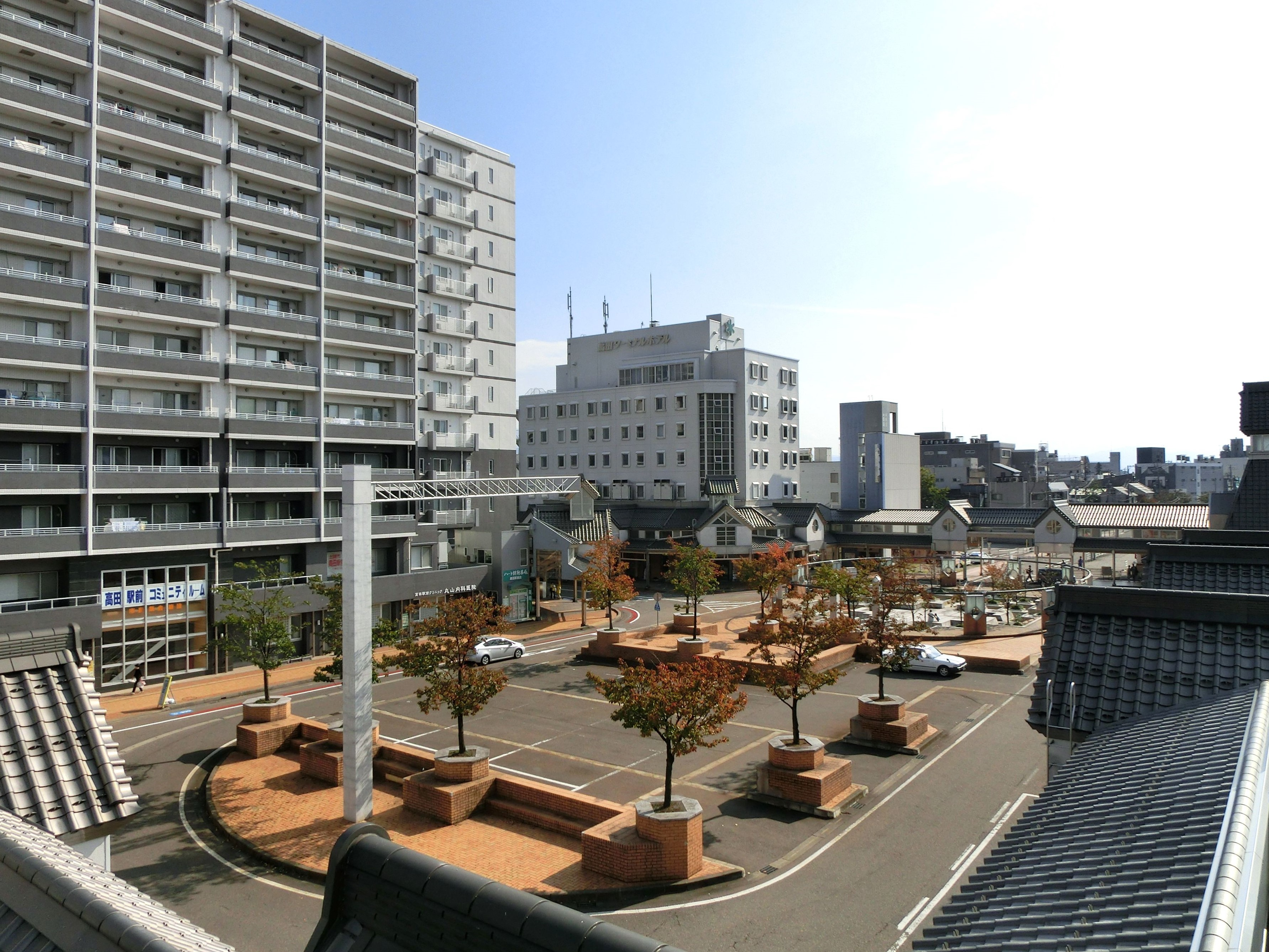
Jōetsu City

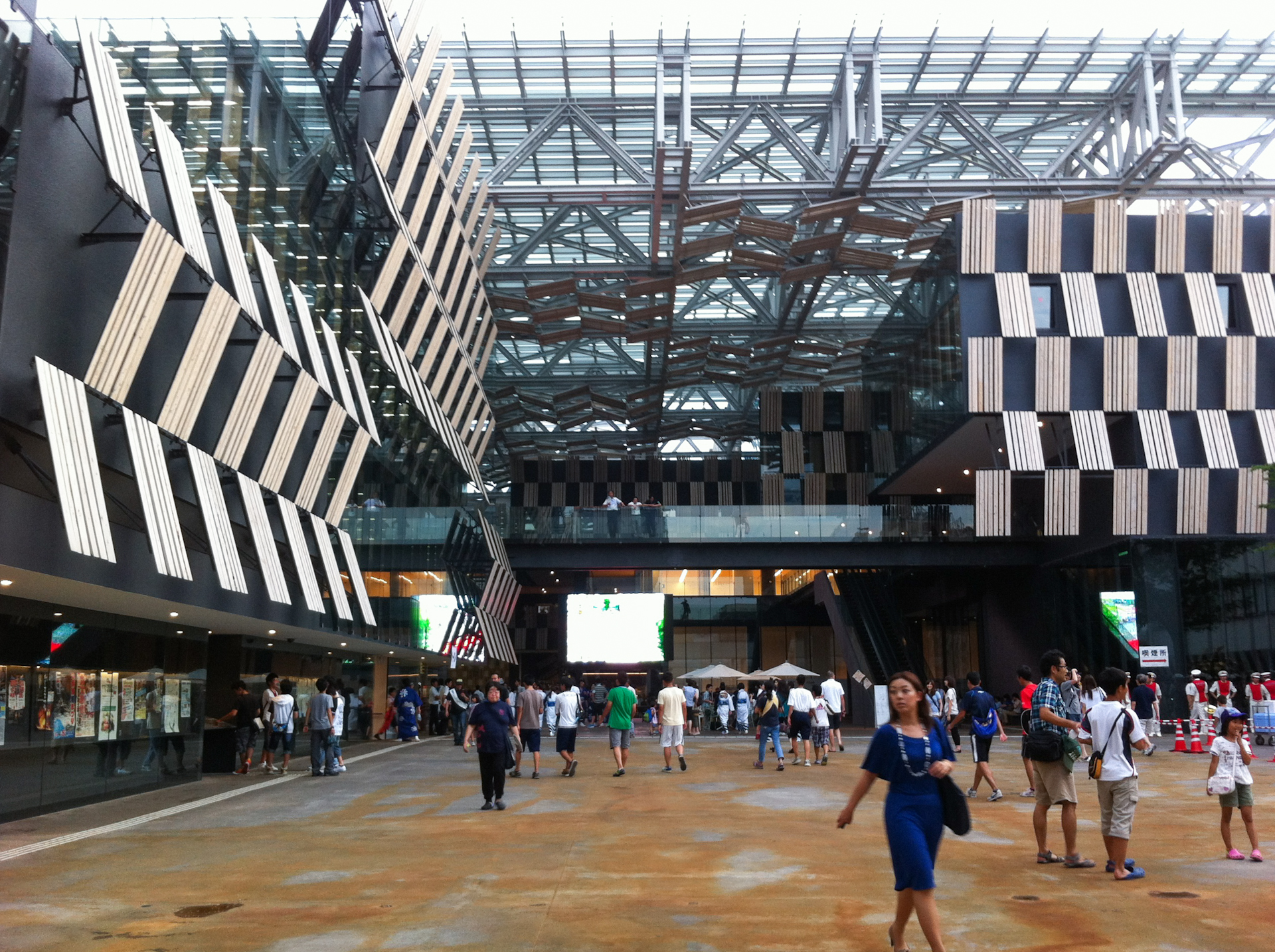
Nagaoka City

== Industries ==
The main industries in the Hokuriku area include chemicals, medicine, tourism, textiles and textile machinery, heavy machinery, farming, and fishing. Koshihikari, a popular variety of rice is a special product of Hokuriku subregion.

== Demographics ==
Per Japanese census data, Hokuriku subregion has had negative population growth since year 2000.

Historical population
Year	Pop.	±%
1920	3,846,000	—
1930	4,087,000	+6.3%
1940	4,289,000	+4.9%
1950	5,179,000	+20.8%
1960	5,201,000	+0.4%
1970	5,137,000	−1.2%
1980	5,467,000	+6.4%
1990	5,584,000	+2.1%
2000	5,606,505	+0.4%
2010	5,443,799	−2.9%
2020	5,186,388	−4.7%

== Climate ==
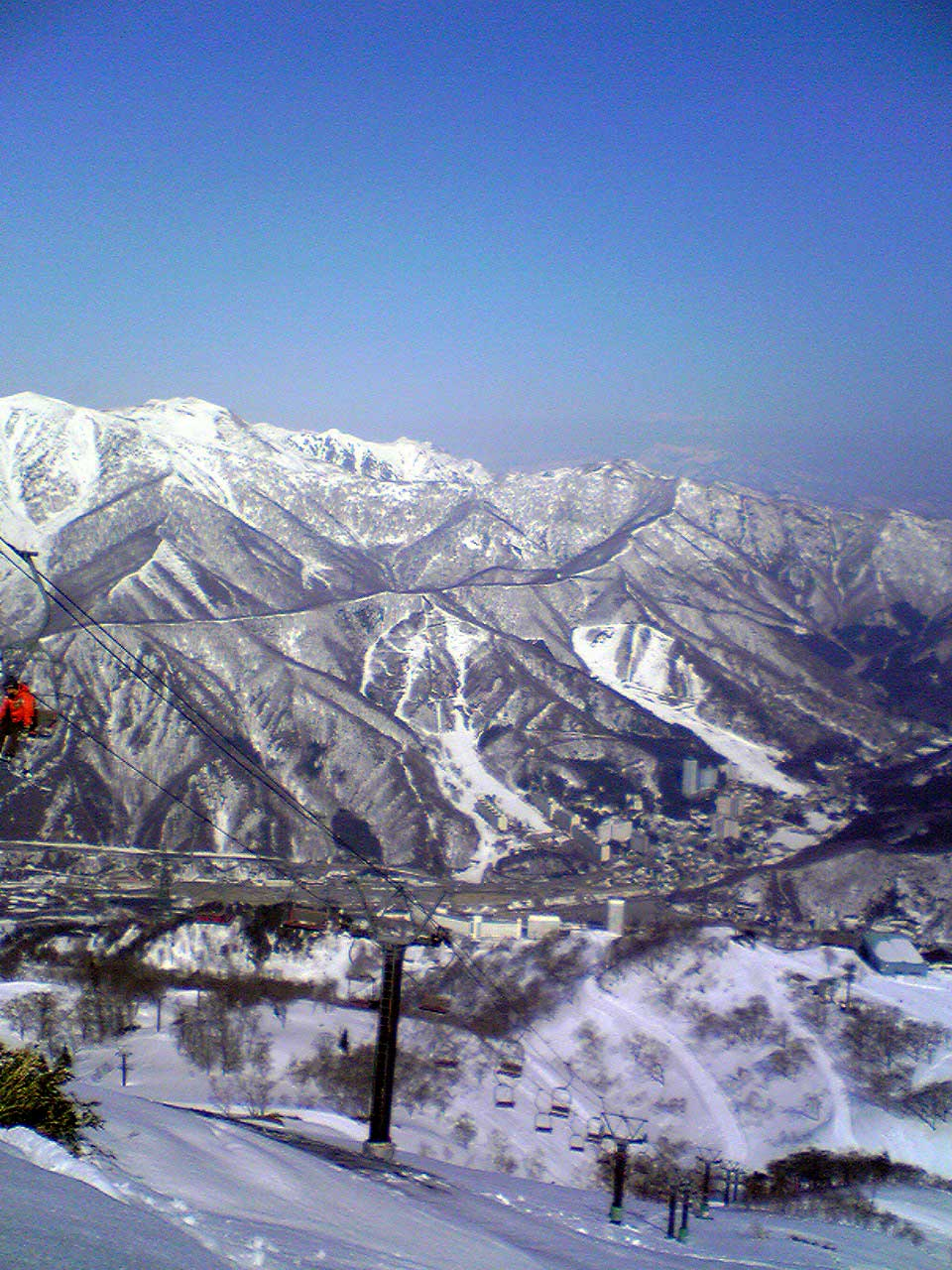
Naeba Ski Resort, Yuzawa, Niigata

The Hokuriku region has the highest volume of snowfall of any inhabited and arable region in the world. This is because dry Siberian air masses, which develop high humidity over the Sea of Japan, are forced upwards when they encounter the mountains of Honshū, causing the humidity to condense as snow.

The long winters and deep snow of this region are depicted in Hokuetsu Seppu, an encyclopedic work of the late Edo period which describes life in the Uonuma district of Niigata Prefecture.

The Hokuriku region is also the setting for Yasunari Kawabata's novel Snow Country.

== Tourism ==
In 2014, the Hokuriku region was listed among the Top 10 Regions by travel media Lonely Planet. The region has seen an influx of tourists since 2015 as the Hokuriku Shinkansen (formerly Nagano Shinkansen) extended its services from Nagano to Kanazawa, enabling direct bullet train services to the Hokuriku region from Tokyo. When services commenced in March 2015, the travel time from Tokyo to Toyama was reduced to about 2 hours, with Kanazawa an additional 30 minutes away. In March 2024, the Hokuriku Shinkansen was further extended to Tsuruga via Fukui, with travel time from Tokyo to Fukui and Tokyo to Tsuruga reduced to 2 hours and 51 minutes and 3 hours and 8 minutes respectively.

== See also ==
- Hokuriku dialect
- Hokuriku Expressway
- Hokuriku Main Line
- Hokuriku Shinkansen
- Kitamaebune
- Kōshin'etsu region
- Shin'etsu region
- Tōhoku region
- Tōkai region

== Citations ==
- Nussbaum, Louis-Frédéric and Käthe Roth (2005). Japan Encyclopedia. Cambridge, Massachusetts: Harvard University Press. OCLC 58053128. ISBN 0-674-01753-6, ISBN 978-0-674-01753-5.
