= Snowflake Bentley (book) =

1998 picture book by Jacqueline Briggs Martin

- Snowflake Bentley
- Author: Jacqueline Briggs Martin
- Illustrator: Mary Azarian
- Cover artist: Azarian
- Genre: Children's picture book
- Publisher: Houghton Mifflin
- Publication date: 1998
- Publication place: United States
- Pages: 32
- ISBN: 978-0-395-86162-2
- OCLC: 36676027
- Dewey Decimal: 551.57/841/092 B 21
- LC Class: QC858.B46 M37 1998

Snowflake Bentley is a children's picture book written by Jacqueline Briggs Martin and illustrated by Mary Azarian. Published in 1998, the book is about Wilson Bentley, the first known photographer of snowflakes. Azarian won the 1999 Caldecott Medal for her illustrations. In 2003, the company Weston Woods Studios, Inc. adapted the book to a film, narrated by Sean Astin. It was released on DVD in 2004.

== Description ==
Snowflake Bentley is a medium-size book, measuring 10 ½ by 10 ¼ inches, and having 16 pages of illustrations. The majority of the pictures are large colorful prints, the typical art style of artist Mary Azarian, and each picture summarizes the wording for that page. Many of the pages have a vertical side bar in each layout, with a light blue background, and white snowflakes that contains factual information about Wilson Bentley. Azarian also uses a black bold frame around her illustrations, intended to represent a photo that has been taken.

== Synopsis ==
The book is based on the life the first known snowflake photographer, Wilson Bentley, and his interest in capturing the beauty of snowflakes through photography. Wilson lived on a farm with his family in Jericho, Vermont, between Lake Champlain and Mount Mansfield, where the annual snowfall can reach up to about 120 inches. Wilson was very fond of snowflakes and wanted to capture them one day to share with others. With a microscope, Wilson tried to depict the snowflakes through drawings but was never able to finish, as the snow would melt too quickly.

As Wilson grew older, he asked his parents if they could get him a camera, so that he could photograph snowflakes. Wilson’s parents decided to spend their savings to buy Wilson his camera because they wanted to support his dream of capturing snowflake photos. With his new-found camera, Wilson went out to take hundreds of pictures.

In the beginning, Wilson’s photos were unsuccessful, but that did not stop him from pursuing his dream. Wilson experimented with lighting, lenses and camera exposures, eventually finding a technique that captured the snowflakes clearly. When it wasn't winter, Wilson loved taking pictures of other aspects of nature, but taking snow pictures would always be his favorite. Wilson would even hold evening slideshows on his lawn to show his friends.

Eventually, Wilson wrote a book about snow and published his photos in magazines. When Wilson went to publish his first book to share to the world, he got caught in a blizzard on his trip, a misfortune which caused him to catch pneumonia and become ill. Two weeks later, Wilson died of the illness. Wilson’s friends and neighbors built a museum of his work to educate the world about “Snowflake” Bentley.

== Critical reception ==
Snowflake Bentley received critical acclaim. Kirkus reviews says “This is a lyrical biographical tribute to a farmer…whose love of snow and careful camera work expanded both natural science and photography”, and Horn book review says “The book exhibits a beautiful blend of Azarian’s splendid woodcuts, a lyrical text, and factual sidebars.”

Awards
Preceded by Rapunzel	Caldecott Medal recipient 1999	Succeeded by Joseph Had a Little Overcoat
