= Wilson Alwyn "Snowflake" Bentley House =

Historic house in Vermont, United States

- U.S. National Register of Historic Places
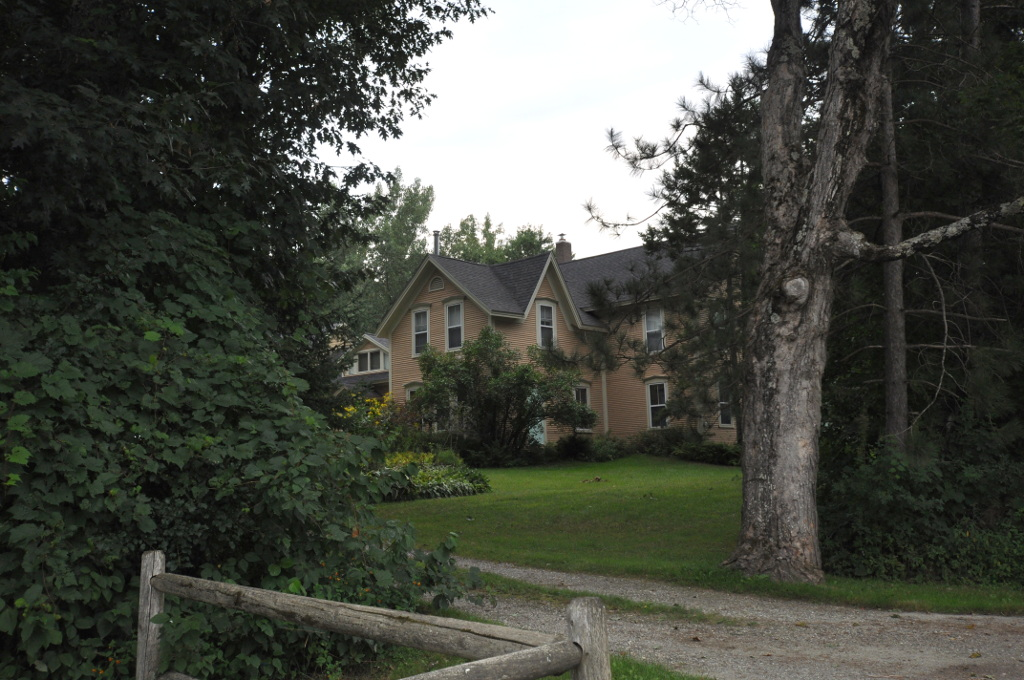

- Location within Vermont Location within the United States
- Location: Nashville Rd., Jericho, Vermont
- Coordinates: 44°27′1″N 72°55′57″W
- Area: 4 acres (1.6 ha)
- Built: 1860
- Architectural style: Greek Revival, Gothic Revival
- NRHP reference No.: 80004501
- Added to NRHP: July 3, 1980

The Wilson Alwyn "Snowflake" Bentley House is a historic house on Nashville Road in Jericho, Vermont. Built about 1860, it was the lifelong home of Wilson Bentley (1865-1931), the town's best known resident and one of world's innovators in the photography of snowflakes. The house was listed on the National Register of Historic Places in 1980.

== Description and history ==
The Bentley House stands in a rural area of southeastern Jericho, on the south side of Nashville Road a short way west of Bentley Lane. It is a 2 1/2-story wood-frame structure, with a gabled roof and clapboarded exterior. Extending to either side of the central block are 1 1/2-story cross-gabled ells, the right one fronted by a hip-roof porch. Windows are capped by shallow-pitch peaked lintels, and there is a tin snowflake decoration in a triangular panel at the peak of the central gable. The ells each have front-facing gable dormers with steeply pitched roofs. A third ell projects to the house's rear; it is there that Wilson Bentley had his photographic studio.

The house was built about 1860 and enlarged by the addition to the west about 1887. Wilson Bentley was the grandson of one of Jericho's early settlers, and lived here his entire life. Largely self-educated, he developed at an early age equipment and techniques for capturing microphotographs of snowflakes, a subject on which he became a well-known authority.

== See also ==
- National Register of Historic Places listings in Chittenden County, Vermont
