= The Four Seasons of Mary Azarian =

- Author: Mary Azarian
- Language: English
- Publisher: David R Godine
- Publication date: September 1, 2000
- Pages: 109 ppg
- ISBN: 1567921205

The Four Seasons of Mary Azarian is a 2000 children's book by Mary Azarian. The book contains wood carvings that have been printed from the author's woodcut carvings, some of which have been painted. It has been reviewed positively, for example The Boston Globe called it a regional book that is a "classic winner".

== Synopsis ==
The Four Seasons of Mary Azarian has carvings of all four seasons, depicting activities and sights which may occur in each of them. For each season, there are short stories of inspiration by seasonal changes, or of stories that Mary has experienced in those seasons.

== Reception ==
Reception for The Four Seasons of Mary Azarian has been mostly positive. Booklist gave the book a positive review, praising Azarian's wood carvings. The Boston Globe called it a regional book that is a "classic winner".
