= Mary Azarian =

American writer

Mary Azarian (born 1940) is an American woodcut artist and children's book illustrator. She won the 1999 Caldecott Medal for U.S. picture book illustration, recognizing Snowflake Bentley by Jacqueline Briggs Martin. It tells about the life of Wilson Bentley. She lives in Calais, Vermont. She produces original prints and has illustrated over 50 books.

== Early life ==
Azarian grew up on her grandfather's farm on the outskirts of Washington, DC. Her grandfather’s farm had thousands of chicken along with geese that would bother the customers that came to buy his eggs. Azarian’s uncle grew vegetables. Being around her family gardens sparked her lifelong interest in nature. When she was young, she would spend her time exploring the woods and fields with her pony named Pasty.

She began drawing and painting at an early age. In 4th grade, she did her first relief print of woodcuts. This piece of art was a 3 in × 4 in (76 mm × 102 mm) lino block of an angel with the name NOEL at the bottom. She ran into a problem and learned a valuable lesson from this project; words must be reversed when doing a woodcut. Her finished product read LEON.

== Education ==
Azarian continued to lino cuts until she later attended Smith College, where she studied printmaking and painting with one of the great 20th century printmakers, Leonard Baskin.

== Career ==
After she graduated from Smith College, she moved to farm in Vermont. Azarian and her husband raised horses, oxen, chickens, a jersey milk cow, a sheep, and a goat with the help of their three sons.

Before beginning her career as a full-time artist, Azarian taught in a one-room schoolhouse for three years. After she finished her three years of teaching, she decided she wanted to make a living selling woodcut prints. She began producing her prints by hand and in black and white. Eventually, she began adding color to her prints by hand. Finally, she found an old Vandercook proof press and began using it to produce the prints.

In the 1970s, Azarian began illustrating children’s books. In 1999, the American Library Association awarded Azarian the Caldecott Medal for her illustrations in the children's book, Snowflake Bentley.

== Family ==
Mary Azarian has three sons with folk musician and artist Tom Azarian, also known by the name of Tom Banjo. Though she took his last name, the two never legally married, and separated in 1982. She also has four grandchildren.

== Selected works ==
- Snowflake Bentley, written by Jacqueline Briggs Martin
- A Farmer's Alphabet
- A Gardener's Alphabet
- Barn Cat
- The Four Seasons of Mary Azarian
- When the Moon is Full
