= Creekfinding =

2017 nonfiction picture book by Jacqueline Briggs Martin

- Author: Jacqueline Briggs Martin
- Illustrator: Claudia McGehee
- Publisher: University of Minnesota Press
- Publication date: March 1, 2017
- ISBN: 978-0-8166-9802-8

Creekfinding: A True Story is a 2017 nonfiction picture book written by Jacqueline Briggs Martin and illustrated by Claudia McGehee. It tells the story of a stream restoration project by Michael Osterholm, who purchased land in northeastern Iowa where a creek had been diverted decades earlier. As the creek is restored, the wildlife, including the native brook trout, gradually returned to the area and flourished.

The book depicts the restoration of the creek with the help of an excavator, which is introduced as a "creekfinding machine". It was published by the University of Minnesota Press on March 1, 2017, and was well received. Critics praised its focus on environmental conservation as well as McGehee's scratchboard illustrations, and in 2018 it received a Riverby Award, which recognizes nature-related books for children, from the John Burroughs Association.

== Background and publication ==
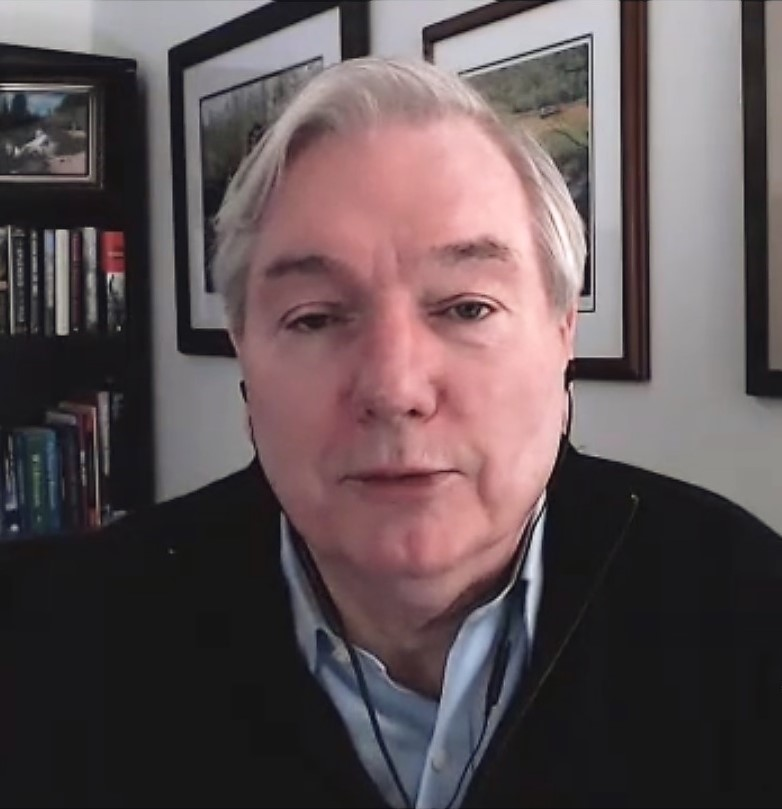
Osterholm in 2021

In 2002, Michael Osterholm purchased 98 acres (0.40 km^{2}) of land near Dorchester, Iowa. Osterholm, an epidemiologist, was told by the previous owner's grandson that his grandfather used to fish in a stream there. He researched the area and confirmed the existence of the stream using old aerial photos. The stream had been diverted in 1949 to make way for planting corn in the fertile soil, and it eventually degraded and was lost. Osterholm, a native of Iowa who had fished in nearby creeks in his childhood, decided to restore the creek.

The restoration of the original 1,280-foot (390 m) stream took place over the next seven years. Osterholm began by clearing out the existing cornfields to uncover the original stream, and replanted native tallgrasses such as big bluestem. Multiple truckloads of boulders were added along the banks of the stream for support. Over time, native plants, insects, and other wildlife returned to the area. In 2009, the Iowa Department of Natural Resources added 500 fingerlings of brook trout, the only surviving native species of trout in the state. The trout flourished in the newly restored creek, which Osterholm named Brook Creek.

Creekfinding: A True Story depicts Osterholm's restoration of Brook Creek and the return of wildlife to the area. The author, Jacqueline Briggs Martin, decided to write a book about Osterholm after reading a November 2011 article about his project published in The Gazette. She spoke with Osterholm as she wrote Creekfinding, although she did not visit Brook Creek in person until after the book was completed. Martin was already friends with the illustrator Claudia McGehee, and asked McGehee to provide the illustrations for the book. According to McGehee, while "traditionally author and illustrator don't connect during the creation of a picture book," the two collaborated throughout the development of the book, including researching the ecosystem of the creek.

Dedicated to "those who take care of our green places", the 36-page book was published by the University of Minnesota Press on March 1, 2017. In addition to the story, the book includes remarks from Martin, McGehee, and Osterholm.

== Synopsis ==
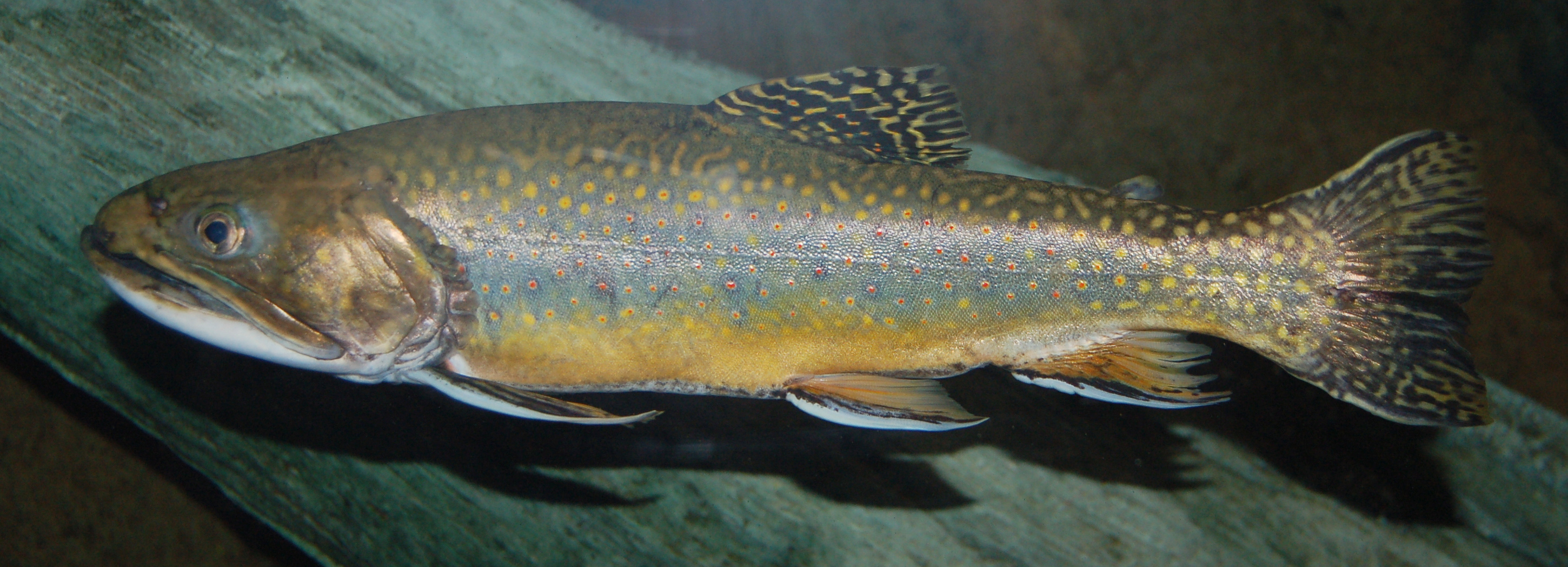
Adult brook trout

The book introduces the excavator as a "creekfinding machine" that can help uncover lost creeks. It shows a vibrant creek being diverted as a farmer uses a bulldozer to fill it with dirt for growing corn. Decades later, Mike learns about the former creek and decides to restore it despite the skepticism of others. He marks the creek's former path and an excavator is used to dig into the ground to locate it. Mike waits until the winter to have trucks deliver rocks to line the creek, so that the ground is frozen by then and the trucks do not damage the soil. Plants, insects, and sculpins return to the creek, and the trout are delivered in another truck. Two years later, the trout lay eggs that hatch during the winter. The book concludes with the flourishing ecosystem and a thanks "to Mike and the big machines that found the creek".

== Writing and illustrations ==
The narrative is organized into discrete sections, with titles such as "Scraping and Digging" and "Time for Trout". Renée Wheeler of The Horn Book Guide described Martin's writing as "vivid" and "descriptive", and throughout the book, questions about the restoration process are asked and then answered to pique the reader's interest. Personification is used to characterize the actions of the excavator as well as the water's return to the area. Martin said she spent several months figuring out how to best describe the ecosystem, and that one of her favorite lines from the book was "a creek is more than water". At one point during the writing process, the draft was as long as 1200 words, but it was trimmed to about 400 words in the final version.

McGehee said that she visited Brook Creek before creating the illustrations because she "wanted to re-create the textures and colors [she] saw, so readers could 'walk' alongside Brook Creek as they learned about its restoration". Her illustrations were created using a scratchboard technique (in which the artist scratches off dark ink to reveal a layer beneath) with watercolor and dyes, with the result resembling painted woodcuts with thick, curving outlines. A reviewer for Kirkus Reviews felt that the omission of color from one spread was particularly effective for creating a sense of anticipation. According to McGehee, machines like the excavators and dump trucks were the most challenging because she had less experience illustrating them, compared to natural scenery. In addition to the main narrative, minor facts about the restoration process and wildlife are contained within elements of the pictures, such as blades of grass.

== Reception ==
Critics praised Creekfinding for its focus on environmental conservation. Reviewing for School Library Journal, Barbara Auerbach wrote that the book would "inspire the future caretakers of our planet", and several reviewers described it as a "heartening" depiction of the creek's restoration. A reviewer for Publishers Weekly also praised the note from Osterholm at the end of the book that encourages readers to take action and help restore degraded parts of their environment. Reviewers also wrote positively about McGehee's scratchboard illustrations. Kirkus Reviews noted that the detailed pictures, with "curving lines filled with life", would still be visible if the book was read to a small group, and Auerbach described the artwork as "stunning".

The book was listed on the New York Public Library's "100 Best Books for Kids" in 2017. It received a Riverby Award, which recognizes nature-related books for children, from the John Burroughs Association in 2018.

== See also ==
- The Man Who Planted Trees
