= Hokuetsu Seppu =

Geographical Encyclopedia for Uonuma area

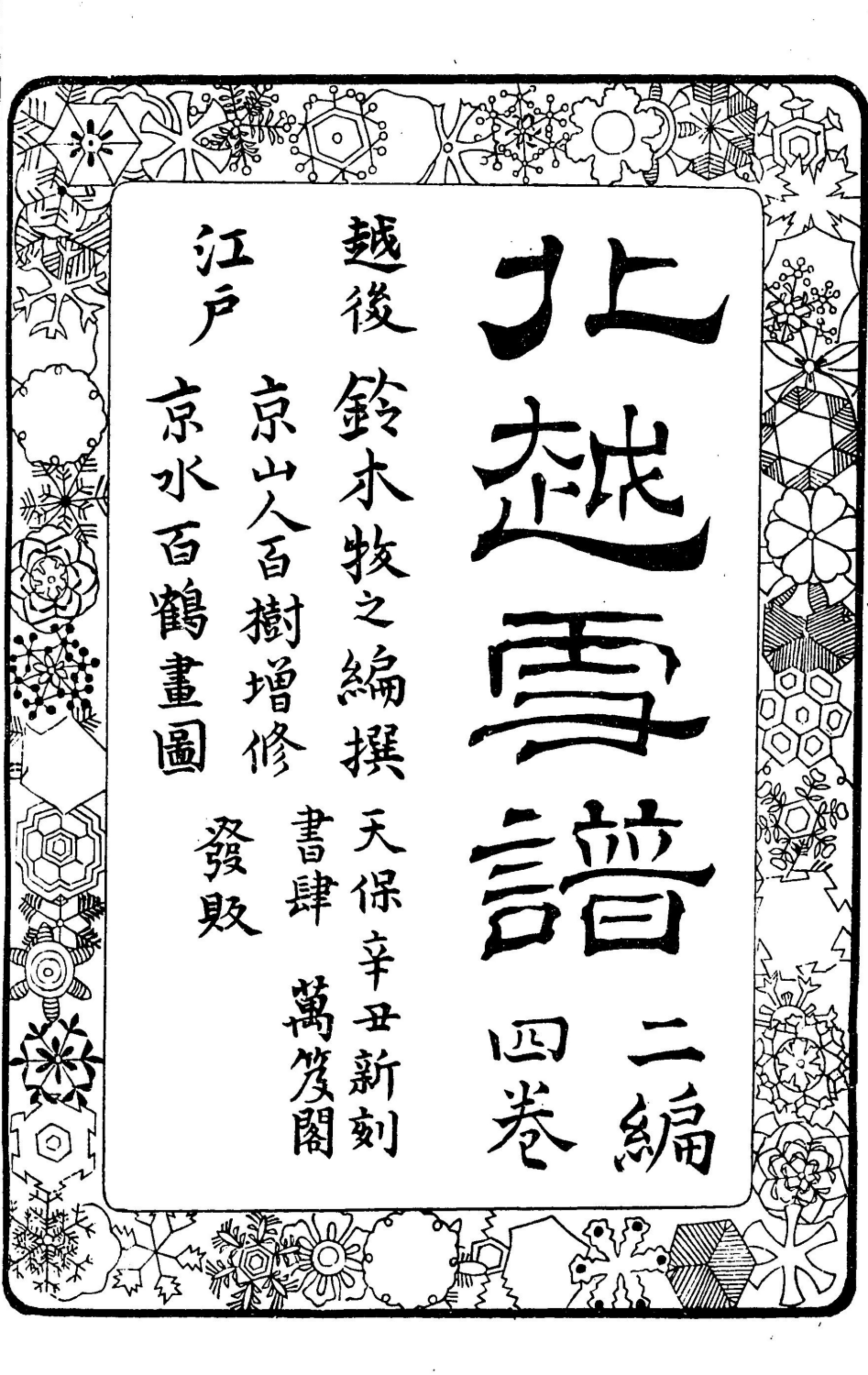
"Hokuetsu Seppu"

Hokuetsu Seppu (北越雪譜 "Snow stories of North Etsu Province"; translation: Snow Country Tales: Life in the other Japan by Jeffrey Hunter with Rose Lesser, Weatherhill, 1986) is a late Edo-period encyclopedic work of human geography describing life in the Uonuma area of Japan's old Echigo Province, a place known for its long winters and deep snow.

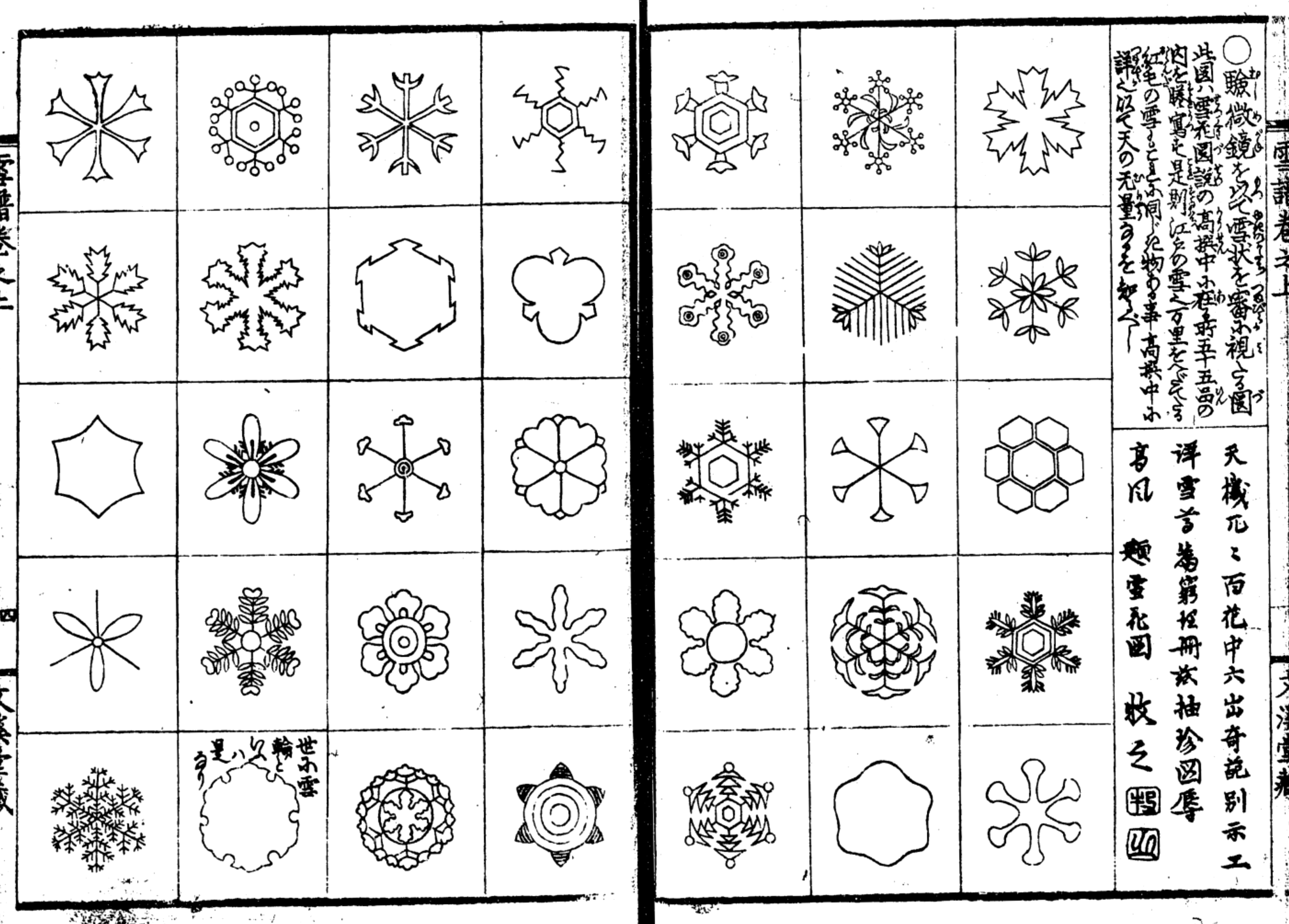
Figure of snow crystals from "Hokuetsu Seppu"

First published in Edo in 1837, Hokuetsu Seppu was written by Suzuki Bokushi (鈴木牧之) (1770–1842), a textile merchant and leading townsman of Shiozawa, a settlement on the old Mikuni Highway. The work, an immediate best seller that eventually encompassed seven chapters when a second volume was published in 1841, covers a wide range of local topics from the varieties of snow to the customs, lifestyles, local dialects, hunting practices, industries, and folk tales of Japan's snow country. The text covers 123 themes from multiple angles and is also richly illustrated with detailed sketches.

Santō Kyōzan (山東京山)—a gesaku writer and brother of Santō Kyōden—assisted with publication of the text. He wrote the preface and drew the illustrations, which were based on Bokushi's originals.

Some of the material in the book is of scientific interest. For example, it contains sketches of 86 types of natural snowflake crystals, copied from Sekka Zusetsu by Doi Toshitsura who made the sketches with the aid of a microscope during his 20 years as daimyō of the Koga Domain. An 1840 edition included an additional 97 sketches by Doi Toshitsura, copied from his expanded edition Zoku Sekka Zusetsu. Thereafter, the snow crystal became a popular design motif on kimono and on chawan, Japanese tea bowls.

== See also ==
- Ukichiro Nakaya
- Yamadachi, described in Hokuetsu Seppu

== Sources ==
- (in Japanese) Suzuki, Bokushi. Hokuetsu Seppu. Edited and annotated by Okada, Takematsu. Iwanami Shoten. Tokyo, 1936; republished 1978. ISBN 4-00-302261-0
- (in Japanese) Yamaoka, Kei. Echigonokuni Yukimonogatari: Suzuki Bokushi to Hokuetsu Seppu (Snow tales of Echigo province: the story of Suzuki Bokushi and his Hokuetsu Seppu). Kobunsha. Tokyo, 1996. ISBN 4-7704-0891-9
- Hunter, Jeffrey and Lesser, Rose, translators. Snow Country Tales: Life in the other Japan. John Weatherhill Inc. Tokyo, 1986. ISBN 0-8348-0210-4
