= Jacqueline Briggs Martin =

American writer

- Born: April 15, 1945 (age 81); Lewiston, Maine
- Education: Wellesley College; University of Minnesota
- Occupation: Author
- Writing career
- Genre: Children's Literature
- Notable work: Snowflake Bentley
- Website: jacquelinebriggsmartin.com

Jacqueline Briggs Martin is an American author of children's literature and a teacher of creative writing. Her books have received several awards including, Caldecott Medal (1999), Golden Kite Award, Lupine Award (1996, 1998, 2003), Award for Excellence in Children's Literature from the Sterling North Society, and the Green Earth Award (2018). She has taught at Cornell College, University of Iowa, The Loft Literary Center, and is on faculty at Hamline University.

== Early life and education ==
Martin was born in Lewiston, Maine on April 15, 1945. She spent her early life on a dairy farm in Maine. She graduated from Wellesley College in 1966, and obtained a BA from the Institute of Child Development at University of Minnesota in 1971.

== Career ==
She was inspired to write children's literature after reading books with her two kids, wanting to write books that kids and their older relatives would enjoy reading.

Martin finds story ideas from a variety of sources. Some stories start with elements of her own family history and childhood, and others arise from interesting people she has heard about. She spends much of her time doing background research and fact-checking to ensure historical details are present and accurate. In Snowflake Bentley, she had to cut the story to fit the work's picture book format, so she saved some historical facts for sidebars on the pages for interested older readers. Martin believes that writers are always improving and considers herself a slow writer.

== Selected works ==
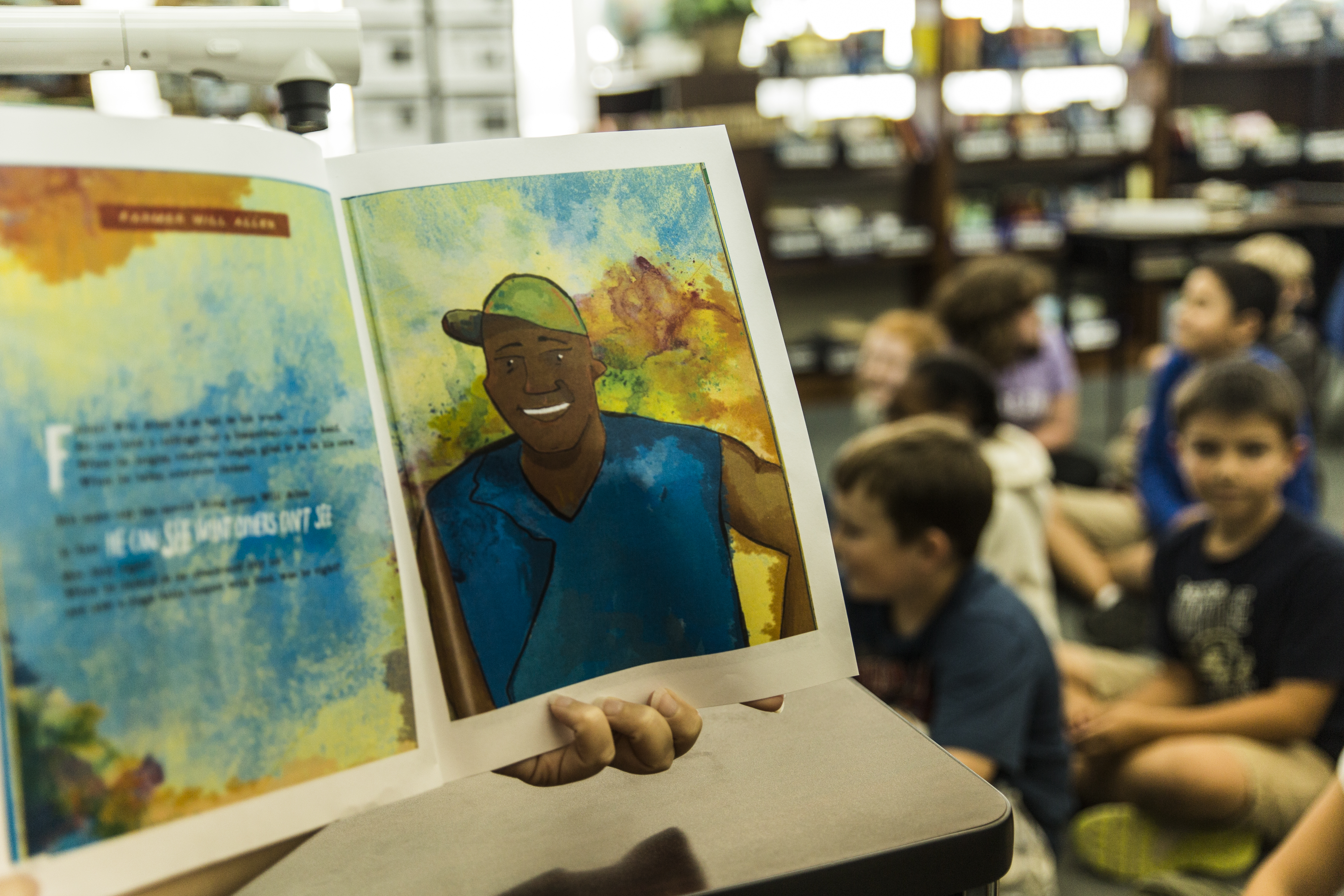
Farmer Will Allen and the Growing Table, official book selection for Read Across the Globe 2015

- Creekfinding: A True Story
- Chef Roy Choi and the Street Food Remix
- Alice Waters and the Trip to Delicious
- Farmer Will Allen and the Growing Table
- The Chiru of High Tibet
- Chicken Joy on Redbean Road
- Banjo Granny
- On Sand Island
- The Finest Horse in Town
- The Water Gift and The Pig of the Pig
- The Lamp, the Ice, and the Boat Called Fish: Based on a True Story
- Snowflake Bentley
- Grandmother Bryant's Pocket
- Good Times on Grandfather Mountain
- Button, Bucket, Sky
- Washing the Willow Tree Loon. Illustrated by Nancy Carpenter. Simon & Schuster, 1995.

== Personal life ==
Martin currently lives in Mount Vernon, Iowa. She married Richard Martin in 1967: they have two children, Sarah and Justin.
