= 13 Assassins (1963 film) =

13 Assassins Jūsan-nin no shikaku
- Directed by: Eiichi Kudo
- Screenplay by: Kaneo Ikegami
- Produced by: Kanji Amao; Jun'ichirō Tamaki
- Starring: Takayuki Akutagawa; Chiezō Kataoka; Kōtarō Satomi
- Cinematography: Jūhei Suzuki
- Edited by: Shintarō Miyamoto
- Music by: Akira Ifukube
- Production company: Toei Company
- Distributed by: Toei Company
- Release date: 1963
- Running time: 125 minutes
- Country: Japan
- Language: Japanese

13 Assassins (Japanese: 十三人の刺客, romaji: Jūsan-nin no shikaku) is a 1963 Japanese jidaigeki (period drama) film directed by Eiichi Kudo.

The main plot line follows the path of vengeance of 13 assassin samurai who are confronted with the reality of a morally dissipated clan leader with a reputation for raping and murdering his vassals arbitrarily and without remorse. The clan leader is eventually cornered and dispatched at the cost of nearly all of the assassins losing their own lives.

== Plot ==
In 1844, the Tokugawa shogunate in Japan is in a period of transition, and one of the high ranking lords, Lord Matsudaira, has become tainted by his dissolute and reprobate misconduct. Many leaders in the governing community of the current government feel that the code of honor, bushido, of the samurai is being disgraced by Matsudaira. His reprobate, egotistical, and feckless lifestyle is disgusting to those who come into close contact with him. After receiving reports, Sir Doi is convinced that Matsudaira represents a severe threat to the entire code of honor for the samurai tradition. Sir Doi decides, because of the severity of Matsudaira's misconduct, to take a blood oath to assassinate the reprobate Lord Matsudaira. He enlists a troop of assassins to swear a similar blood oath to do away with Matsudaira in order to restore his country's wellbeing and code of honor.

Shinzaemon gathers a diverse group of warriors with the intent to trap and kill Matsudaira and his 200 bodyguards in the town of Ochiai. Using clever tactics, Shinzaemon successfully evens the odds against the overwhelming force and defeating the enemy lord and his rival, the leader of the bodyguards, Hanbei. After their lord is killed, the lead bodyguard corners Shinzaemon and attacks only to find that Shinzaemon, although holding his sword, makes no defense against the mortal sword thrust. Asking him why Shinzaemon Hayato did not parry his deadly thrust, Shinzaemon tells him that this is how it must be before dying. Shinzaemon had decided that after completing his mission of vengeance, that he would then have to sacrifice his own life in fulfillment of his sense of honor as a samurai.

== Cast ==
- Takayuki Akutagawa as Narrator
- Chiezō Kataoka as Shinzaemon Shimada
- Kōtarō Satomi as Shinrokurō Shimada
- Ryōhei Uchida as Hanbei kitou
- Tetsurō Tanba as Doi Toshitsura
- Satomi Oka
- Yuriko Mishima
- Junko Fuji as Kayo
- Chōichirō Kawarasaki
- Michitarō Mizushima
- Kunio Kaga
- Seishiro Sawamura
- Kusuo Abe
- Shingo Yamashiro as Koyata Kiga
- Kōshirō Harada
- Shunji Kasuga
- Ushio Akashi
- Eijirō Kataoka
- Ryūji Kita
- Ryōsuke Kagawa
- Kantarō Suga as Naritsugu
- Shun'ya Wazaki
- Hiroshi Mizuno
- Michimaro Kotabe
- Tsukie Matsuura
- Noboru Aihara
- Masao Hori
- Kinnosuke Takamatsu
- Akira Shioji as Horii
- Masaharu Arikawa
- Mitsugu Fujii
- Ryōzō Tanaka
- Kandō Arashi
- Kunio Hikita
- Kyōnosuke Murai
- Masuo Kamiki
- Jun Harukawa
- Ren Takahashi
- Ryōnosuke Doi
- Masaru Fujiwara
- Isamu Dobashi
- Hiroshi Kasuga
- Kanjūrō Arashi as Saheita Kuranaga
- Kō Nishimura as Kujūrō Hirayama
- Ryūnosuke Tsukigata as Makino
- Isao Natsuyagi (uncredited)

== Remakes ==
The film was remade in 2010 by Takashi Miike. The remake was met with critical acclaim. BFI, in an assessment of the top ten samurai films, compared the remake of the film to the original version stating: "Set in 1844, 13 Assassins follows the Seven Samurai template, featuring a band of samurais who come together to overthrow a despotic lord for the greater good of society. Miike’s version benefits from a far more generous budget, with a wonderful attention to period sets and costumes and some inventively choreographed fight scenes."

Between the original 1963 film and the 2010 remake, a 1990 production by Fuji TV aired as a television movie starring noted actor Tatsuya Nakadai in the lead role (Shimada Shinzaemon).
