= Doi Toshitsura =

Japanese daimyō (1789-1848)

- 土井 利位
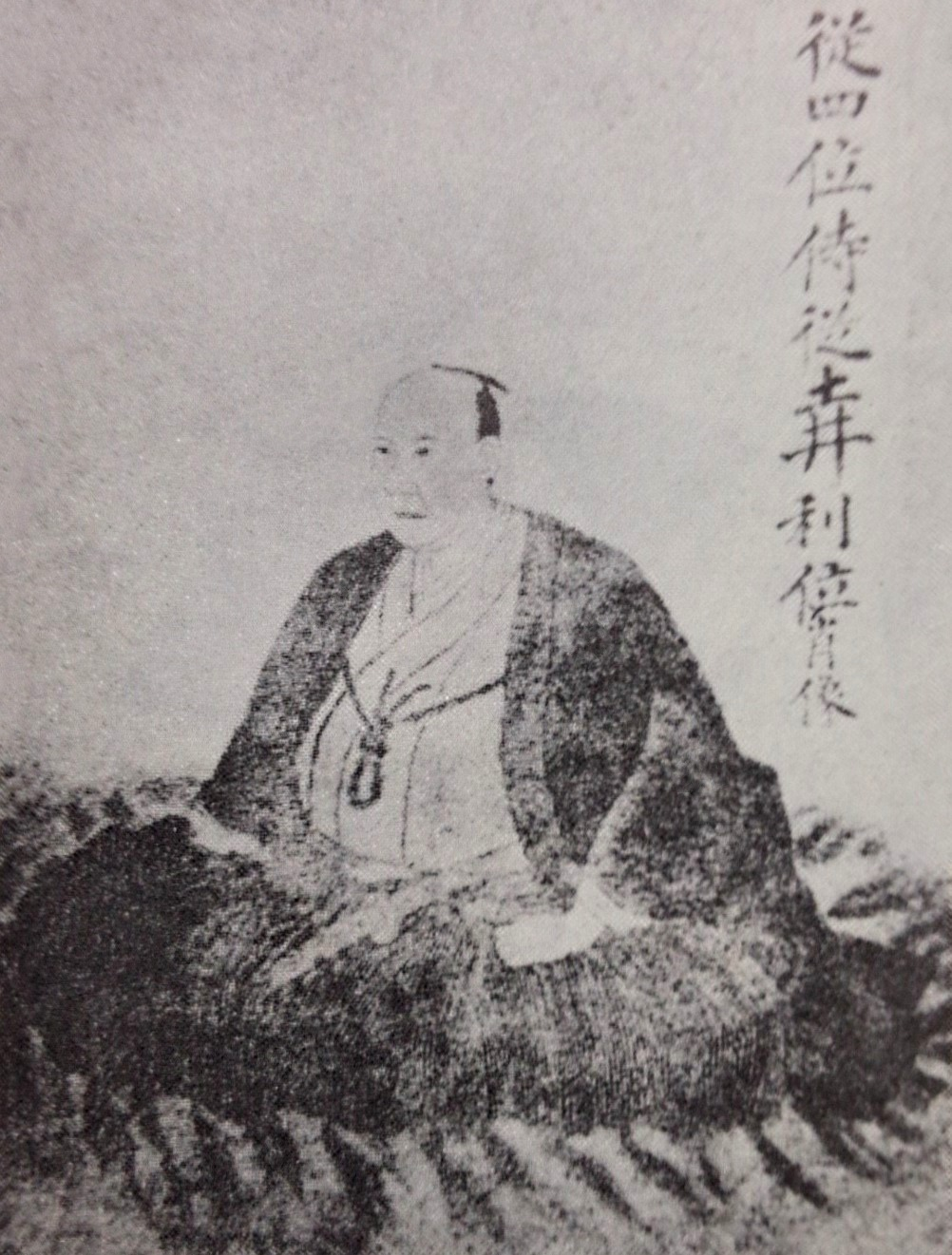

Daimyō of Koga
- In office 1822–1844
- Preceded by: Doi Toshiatsu
- Succeeded by: Doi Toshinari

Personal details
- Born: June 15, 1789
- Died: July 31, 1848 (aged 59)

Doi Toshitsura (土井 利位; June 15, 1789 – July 31, 1848) was a Japanese daimyō of the Edo period, who ruled the Koga Domain. He served as a rōjū for Tokugawa Ienari during the Tokugawa shogunate.

== Biography ==
Toshitsura was born in 1789. He was known to have a scholarly inclination and surrounded himself with individuals who were scholars, artists, and calligraphers.

One of Toshitsura’s greater cultural legacies are the diagrams he made of 86 types of snowflakes that he catalogued in a book he titled the Sekka zusetsu, published in 1832. He made his drawings by observing snowflakes with a Dutch microscope, and his drawings became popular among the artists of the time, who petitioned to see his work. He would later expand his categories to 97 in 1840. Toshitsura decision to bring his vassal Takami Senseki, a prominent retainer of the Koga Domain, to Nagaskiin 1836 resulted in the reproduction of a 'world map' which modern scholars have celebrated for relating trade routes and art of the time.

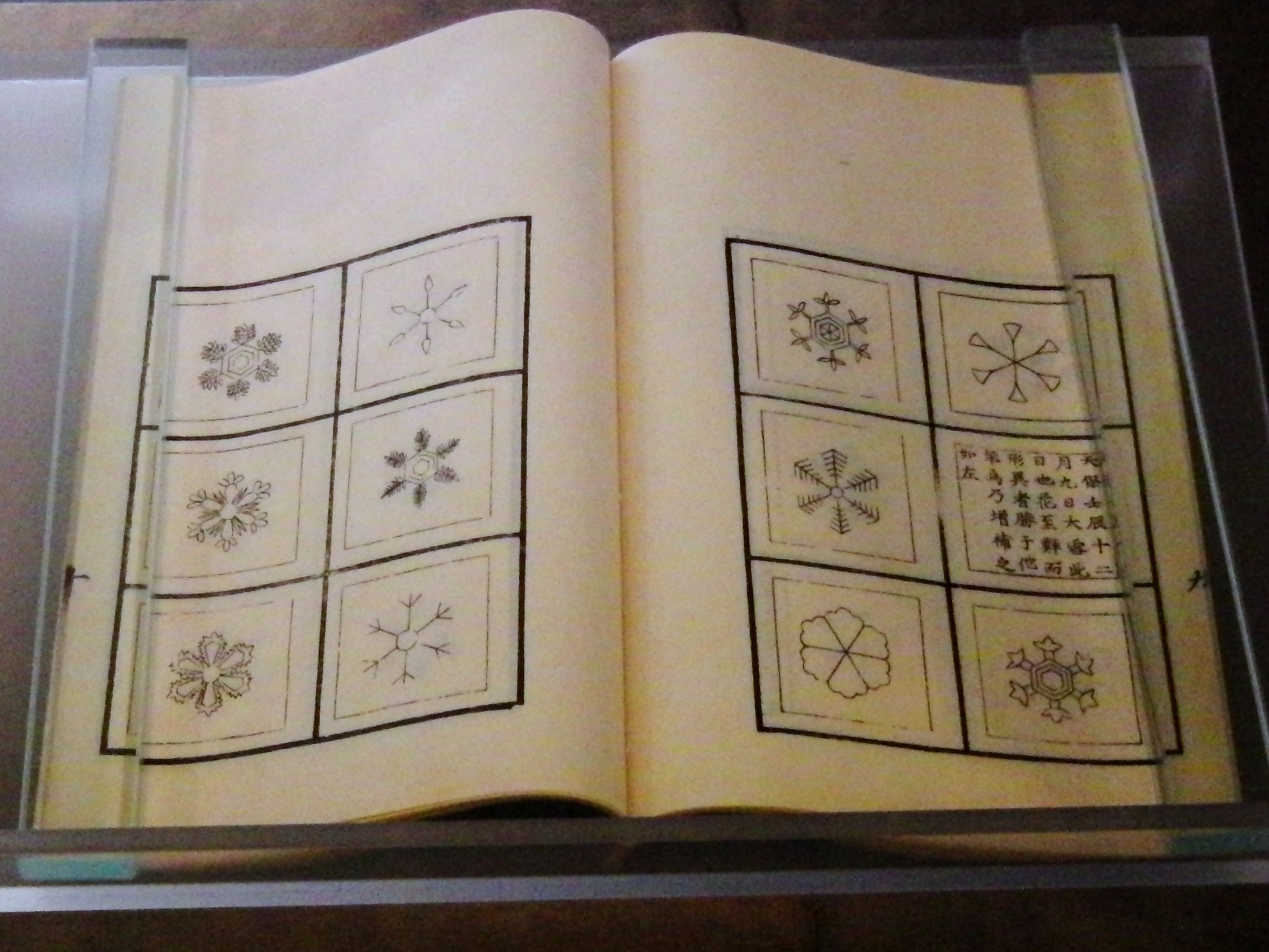
"Sekka zusetsu", Japanese book about snow crystal written by Doi Toshitsura in 1832. Exhibit in the National Museum of Nature and Science, Tokyo, Japan.

In 1837 Toshitsura stopped a revolt led by Oshio Heihachirō, defending the castle of Osaka from Oshio's rebellion.

Among the officials of the Bakufu, Toshitsura was one of the daimyō who were affected by the October 7, 1843 tempō reforms. Toshitsura, who was then a rōjū and held fiefs in Shimosa and Settsu, was in a position to have 13,000 koku of his Settsu holdings to be confiscated by the Bakufu. Despite his previous support for Tadakuni's reforms, this threatened to render him financially insolvent due to debts owed to his peasants. When he failed to negotiate a settlement with his peasants he instead attempted to oppose the Shogun's requests, a decision that rivals tried to pressure him with. Toshitsura would succeed though in getting the Shogun to halt his fief reformation plans.

Toshitsura was succeeded by Abe Masahiro in his capacity as rōjū in 1845. He died in 1848.

== Portrayal in Media ==
- Toshitsura character instigated the assassination against Matsudaira Naritsugu in the 1963 film 13 Assassins, where he was played by Tetsurō Tamba.
- In the 2010 remake of the 1963 film, Toshitsura was played by Mikijirō Hira.

Preceded by Matsudaira Nobuyori	45th Kyoto Shoshidai; 1837–1838	Succeeded by Manabe Akikatsu
