= Wilson Bentley =

American photographer known for photographing snowflakes

Wilson A. Bentley
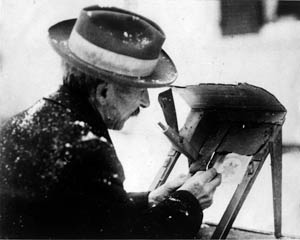
- Bentley at work
- Born: Wilson Alwyn Bentley; February 9, 1865; Jericho, Vermont, United States
- Died: December 23, 1931 (aged 66); Jericho, Vermont, United States
- Known for: Pioneering the study of atmospheric ice crystal formation and snowflake photography

Wilson Alwyn Bentley (February 9, 1865 – December 23, 1931), also known as Snowflake Bentley, was an American meteorologist and photographer, who was the first known person to take detailed photographs of snowflakes and record their features. He perfected a process of catching flakes on black velvet such that their images could be captured before they either melted or sublimated, and elaborated the theory that no two snowflakes are identical.

Kenneth G. Libbrecht notes that the techniques used by Bentley to photograph snowflakes are essentially the same as those used today, and that while the quality of his photographs reflects the technical limitations of the equipment of the era, "he did it so well that hardly anybody bothered to photograph snowflakes for almost 100 years". The broadest collection of Bentley's photographs is held by the Jericho Historical Society in his home town, Jericho, Vermont.

Bentley donated his collection of original glass-plate photomicrographs of snow crystals to the Buffalo Museum of Science. A portion of this collection has been digitized and organized into a digital library.

== Biography ==
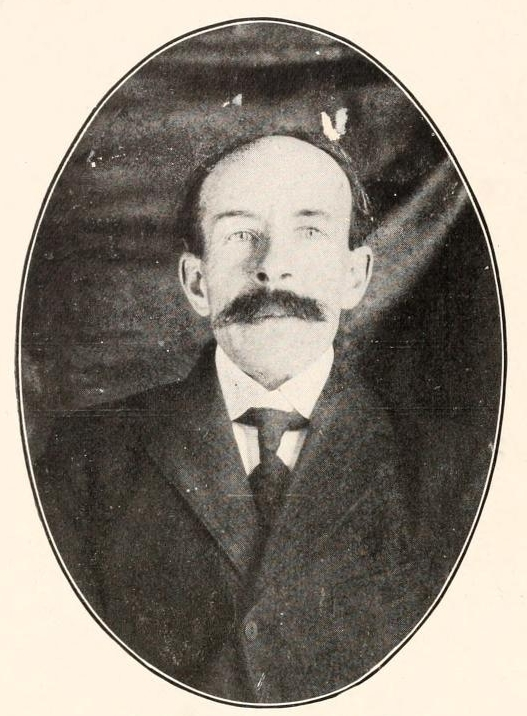
Bentley in 1909

Bentley was born on February 9, 1865, in Jericho, Vermont. He first became interested in snow crystals as a teenager on his family farm. “Always, right from the beginning it was the snowflakes that fascinated me most,” he said. “The farm folks up in this country dread the winter, but I was supremely happy.” He tried to draw what he saw through an old microscope given to him by his mother when he was fifteen. The snowflakes were too complex to record before they melted, so he attached a bellows camera to a compound microscope and, after much experimentation, photographed his first snowflake on January 15, 1885. He captured more than 5,000 images of crystals. Each crystal was caught on a blackboard and transferred rapidly to a microscope slide. Even at subzero temperatures, snowflakes are ephemeral because they sublimate.

Bentley described snowflakes as "tiny miracles of beauty" and snow crystals as "ice flowers." Despite these poetic descriptions, Bentley brought an empirical method to his work. In collaboration with George Henry Perkins, professor of natural history at the University of Vermont, Bentley published an article in which he argued that no two snow crystals were alike. This concept caught the public imagination and he published other articles in magazines, including National Geographic, Nature, Popular Science, and Scientific American. His photographs have been requested by academic institutions worldwide.

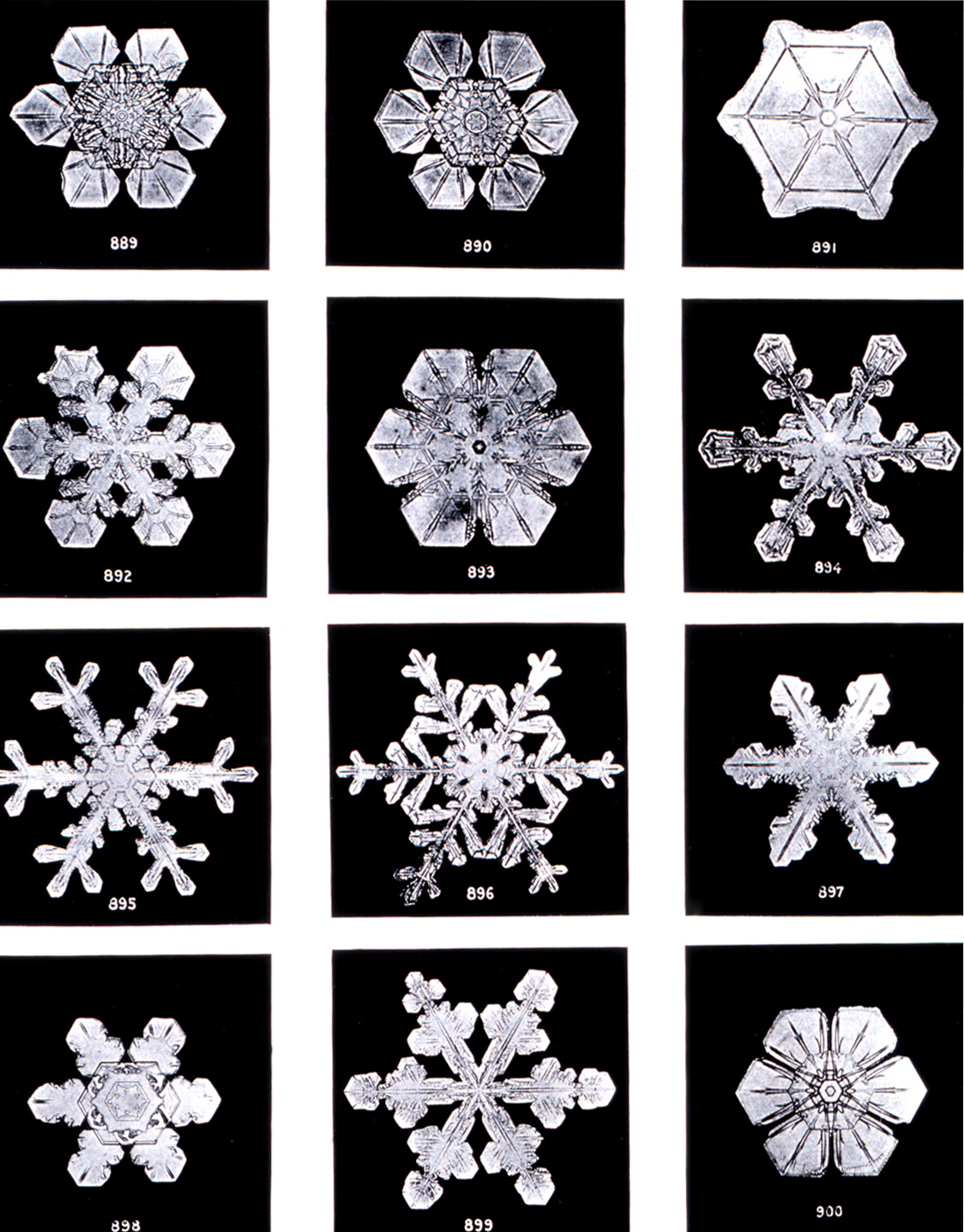
Snowflake photos by Bentley, c. 1902

In 1931 Bentley worked with William J. Humphreys of the U.S. Weather Bureau to publish Snow Crystals, a monograph illustrated with 2,500 photographs. His other publications include the entry on "snow" in the fourteenth edition of Encyclopædia Britannica. Bentley also photographed all forms of ice and natural water formations including clouds and fog. He was the first American to record raindrop sizes, and was one of the first cloud physicists.

He died of pneumonia, which he may have contracted while walking home in the snow, at his farm on December 23, 1931. His book Snow Crystals was published by McGraw-Hill shortly before his death, and is still in print today.

== Legacy ==
Bentley was memorialized in the naming of a science center in his memory at Johnson State College (now Vermont State University) in Johnson, Vermont. His lifelong home is listed on the National Register of Historic Places.

The Caldecott Medal winner in 1999 for the best-illustrated children's book was Snowflake Bentley, which remembers Bentley's life.

At the Fairbanks Museum and Planetarium, a meteorological observation center in St. Johnsbury, Vermont, there is an exhibit about atmospheric ice crystal formation featuring several of Bentley’s photos and a short biography. Bentley was a friend of naturalist, industrialist, and collector Franklin Fairbanks.

Photomicrographs using Bentley's technique of a 19th-century collection of 19 glass-plate negatives of snowflakes held by the Geology Department of the Field Museum in Chicago have been assembled into a field guide by the museum.

== See also ==
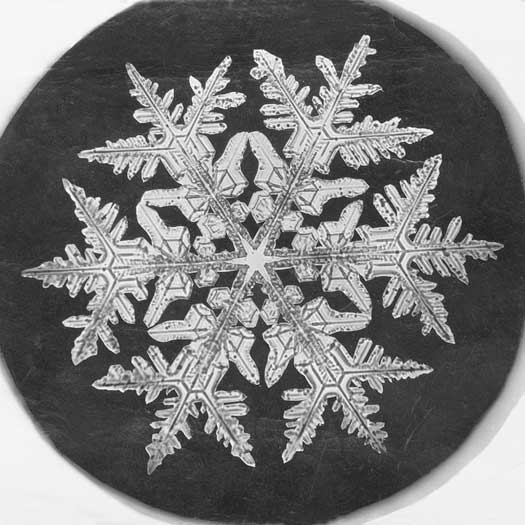
- Bentley snowflake micrograph, 1890
  Patterns in nature
- Ukichiro Nakaya
- Karl Blossfeldt

== Bibliography ==
- Thompson, Jean M., Illustrated by Bentley, Wilson A. Water Wonders Every Child Should Know (Garden City: Doubleday, Page & Co. 1913)
- Bentley, Wilson A. The Guide to Nature (1922)
- Bentley, Wilson A. 'The Magic Beauty of Snow and Dew', National Geographic (January 1923)
- Bentley, Wilson A.; Humphreys, William J. Snow Crystals (New York: McGraw-Hill, 1931)
- Bentley, Wilson A. "Snow", Encyclopædia Britannica: Vol. 20 (14th ed., 1936; pp. 854–856)
- Knight, N. (1988) "No two alike?" Bulletin of the American Meteorological Society 69(5):496

== Other reading ==
- Blanchard, Duncan. The Snowflake Man, A Biography of Wilson A. Bentley, (Blacksburg, VA: McDonald and Woodward, 1998) ISBN 0-939923-71-8.
- Martin, Jacqueline Briggs. Snowflake Bentley, (New York: Houghton Mifflin Co., 1998) ISBN 0-395-86162-4 (a children's biography illustrated with woodcuts hand tinted with watercolors by Mary Azarian. Awarded the Caldecott Medal.)
- Stoddard, Gloria May. Snowflake Bentley: Man of Science, Man of God (Shelburne, VT: New England Press, 1985) ISBN 0-933050-31-3 (Originally published in 1979 by Concordia Publishing House, ISBN 0-570-03620-8).
