= Sekka Zusetsu =

1832 Japanese book on snowflakes

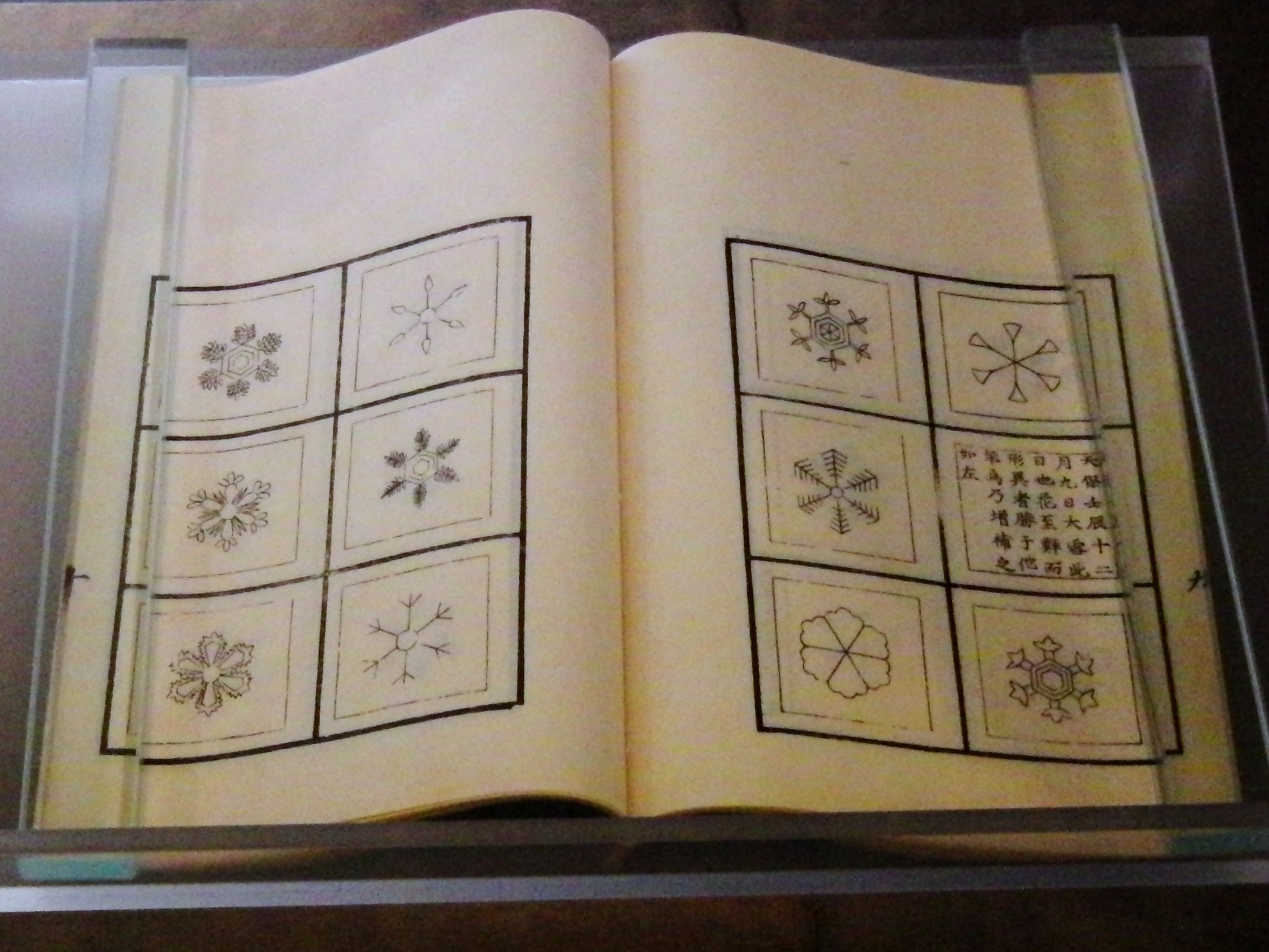

Sekka Zusetsu (雪華図説) is a figure collection written by Doi Toshitsura, the fourth daimyō of Koga Domain in 1832.

== Overview ==
Koga Domain was located at the center of the Kantō Plain. Due to heavy snowfall, the Koga Domain was a good place to observe snowflakes.

Doi Toshitsura, the fourth daimyō of Koga Domain started observing snowflakes as his hobby with his own microscope which was imported from the Netherlands, and he drew pictures and studies about snowflakes in the book. This figure collection of his is highly valued today in Japan as the first Japanese figure collection of snowflakes.

It's said that Toshitsura had many difficulties observing snowflake properly because snowflakes need −10 to −15 °C (14 to 5 °F) temperature to hold their correct shapes. So Toshitsura had to observe them under very cold temperatures.

This book was written for him and his family (the Doi clan, 土井氏), but it had great influence on Japanese textile-patterns also. As soon as he wrote the book, snowflake patterns (雪華模様) became popular among ordinary people in Edo.

== Observation method ==
When it was cold enough to snow, Doi put a black cloth outside at night. He received the snowflakes with a black cloth. If the snowflakes were successfully received, he then put them in a black cup. He was careful not to breathe on them, and he observed the snowflakes with a microscope.
