= Snowflake =

Ice crystals that fall as snow

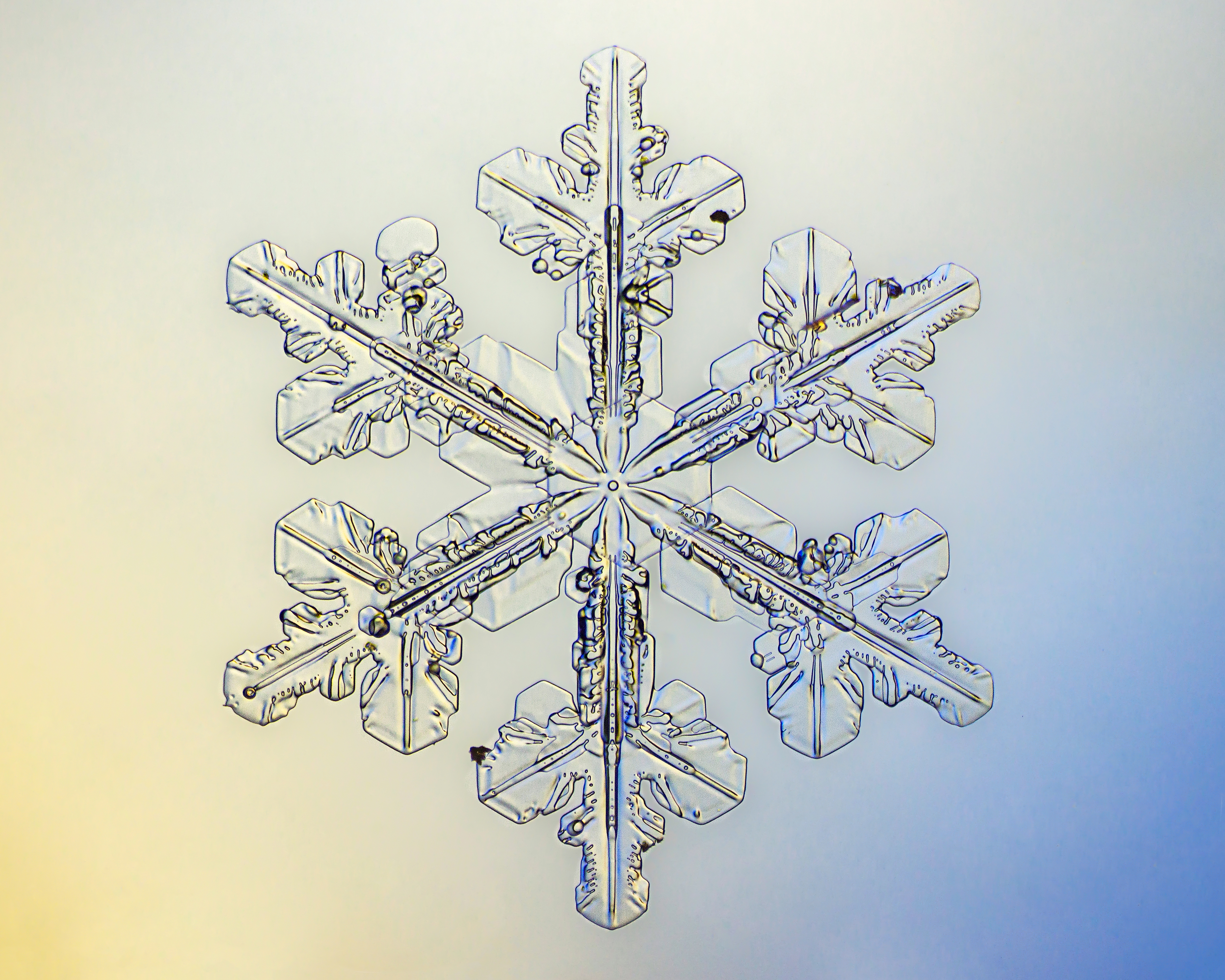
Macro photography of a natural snowflake

A snowflake is a single ice crystal that is large enough to fall through the Earth's atmosphere as snow. Snow appears white in color despite being made of clear ice. This is because the many small crystal facets of the snowflakes scatter the sunlight between them.

Each flake begins by forming around a tiny particle, called its nucleus, accumulating water droplets, which freeze and slowly form a crystal. Complex shapes emerge as the flake moves through differing temperature and humidity zones in the atmosphere, and possibly combines with other snowflakes. Because of this, snowflakes tend to look very different from one another. However, they may be categorized in eight broad classifications and at least 80 individual variants. The main constituent shapes for ice crystals, from which combinations may occur, are the base or "plate", "needle", column, and rime.

== Formation ==
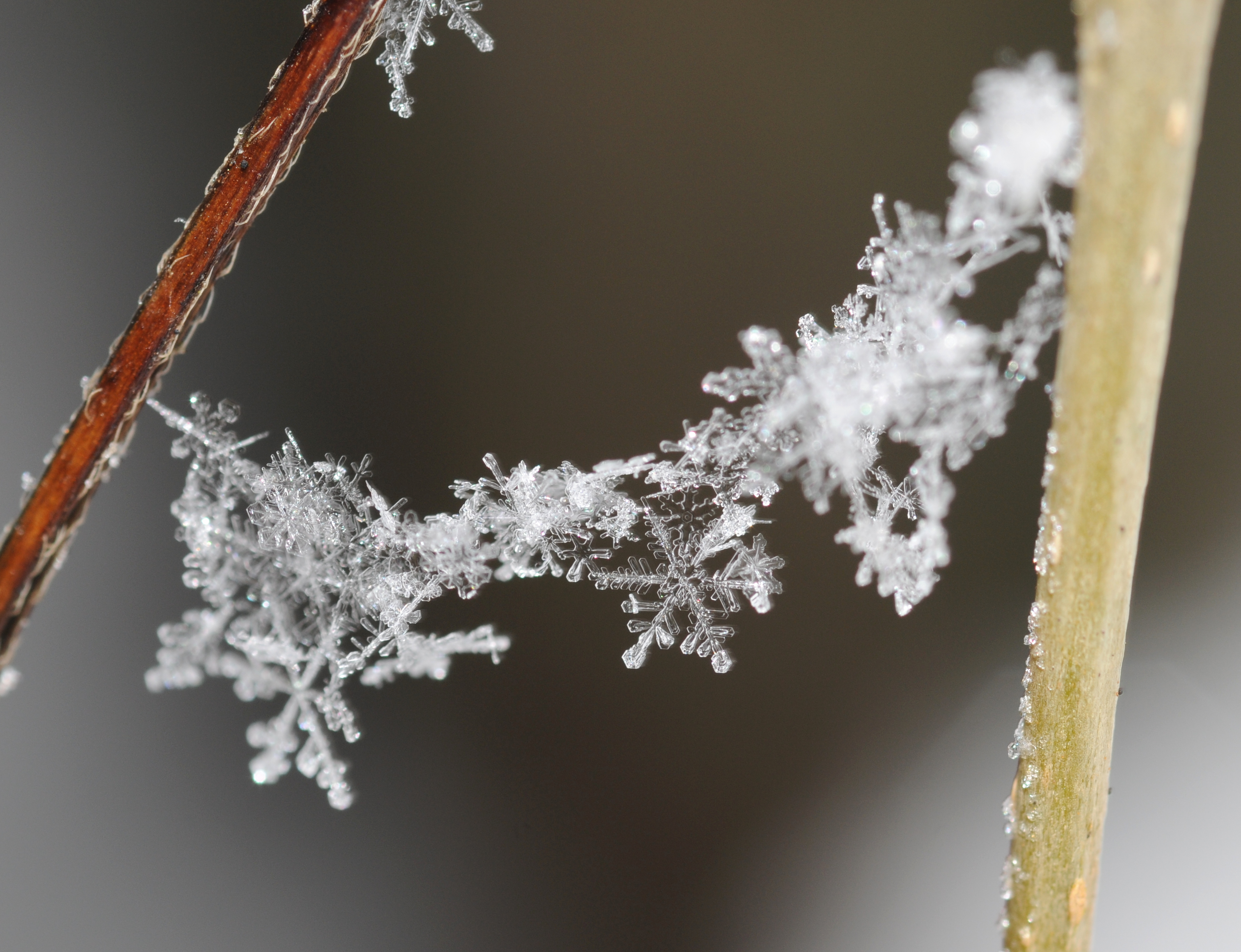
Freshly fallen snowflakes

Snowflakes nucleate around mineral or organic particles in moisture-saturated, subfreezing air masses. They grow by net accretion to the incipient crystals in hexagonal formations. The cohesive forces are primarily electrostatic.

=== Nucleus ===
In warmer clouds, an aerosol particle or "ice nucleus" must be present in (or in contact with) the droplet to act as a nucleus. The particles that make ice nuclei are very rare compared to nuclei upon which liquid cloud droplets form; however, it is not understood what makes them efficient. Clays, desert dust, and biological particles may be effective, although to what extent is unclear. Artificial nuclei include particles of silver iodide and dry ice, and these are used to stimulate precipitation in cloud seeding. Experiments show that "homogeneous" nucleation of cloud droplets only occurs at temperatures lower than −35 °C (−31 °F).

=== Growth ===
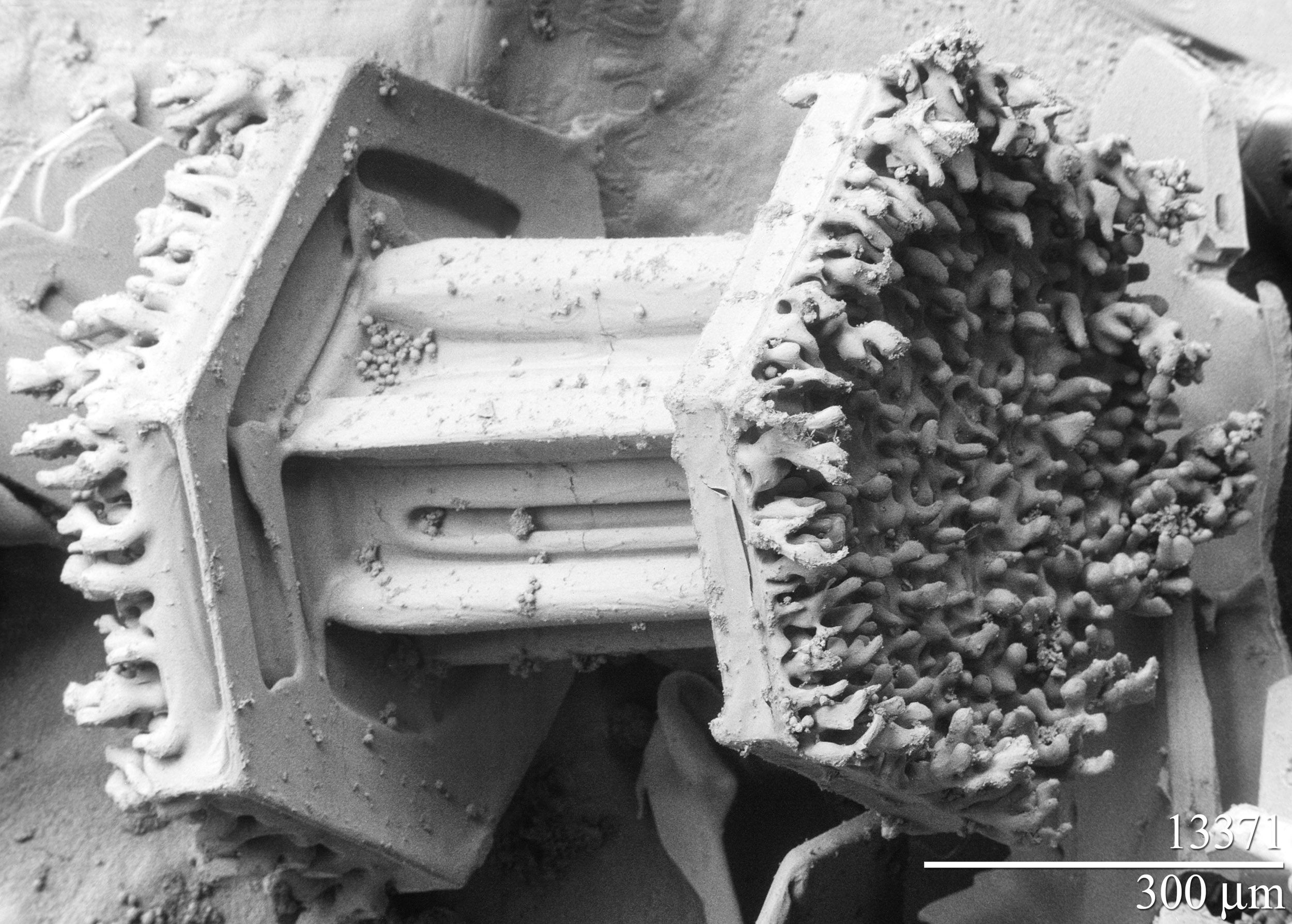
Scanning electron microscope image of rime frost on both ends of a capped column snowflake

Once a water droplet has frozen as an ice nucleus, it grows in a supersaturated environment—wherein liquid moisture coexists with ice beyond its equilibrium point at temperatures below freezing. The droplet then grows by deposition of water molecules in the air (vapor) onto the ice crystal surface where they are collected. Because water droplets are so much more numerous than the ice crystals due to their sheer abundance, the crystals are able to grow to hundreds of micrometers or millimeters in size at the expense of the water droplets. This process is known as the Wegener–Bergeron–Findeisen process.

The corresponding depletion of water vapor causes the droplets to evaporate, meaning that the ice crystals grow at the droplets' expense. These large crystals are an efficient source of precipitation, since they fall through the atmosphere due to their mass, and may collide and stick together in clusters, or aggregates. These aggregates are usually the type of ice particle that falls to the ground.

Guinness World Records lists the world's largest aggregated snowflakes as those of January 1887 at Fort Keogh, Montana, which were claimed to be 38 cm (15 inches) wide—well outside the normally documented range of aggregated flakes of 7.5 or 10 cm (3 or 4 inches) in width. Single crystals the size of a dime (18 mm or 0.705 inches in diameter) have been observed. Snowflakes encapsulated in rime form balls known as graupel.

=== Appearance ===
==== Color ====
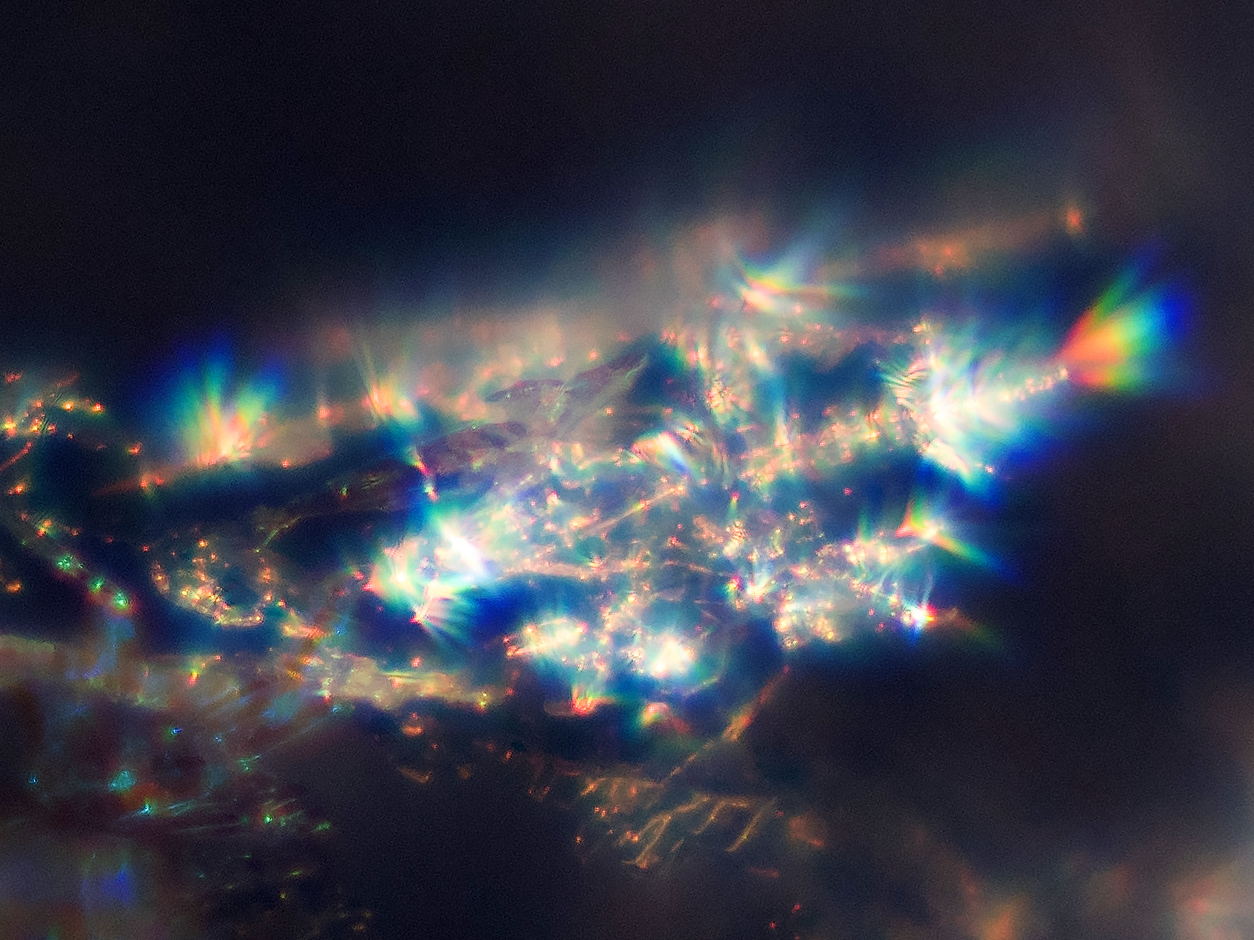
Snow crystals in strong direct sunlight act like small prisms.

Although ice by itself is clear, snow usually appears white in color due to diffuse reflection of the whole spectrum of light by the scattering of light by the small crystal facets of the snowflakes of which it is composed.

==== Shape ====
The shape of the snowflake is determined broadly by the temperature and humidity at which it is formed. Rarely, at a temperature of around −2 °C (28 °F), snowflakes can form in threefold symmetry — triangular snowflakes. Most snow particles are irregular in form, despite their common depiction as symmetrical. It is unlikely that any two snowflakes are alike due to the estimated 10^{19} (10 quintillion) water molecules which make up a typical snowflake, which grow at different rates and in different patterns depending on the changing temperature and humidity within the atmosphere that the snowflake falls through on its way to the ground. Snowflakes that look identical, but may vary at the molecular level, have been grown under controlled conditions.

Although snowflakes are never perfectly symmetrical, the growth of a non-aggregated snowflake often approximates six-fold radial symmetry, arising from the hexagonal crystalline structure of ice. At that stage, the snowflake has the shape of a minute hexagon. The six "arms" of the snowflake, or dendrites, then grow independently from each of the corners of the hexagon, while either side of each arm grows independently.

The microenvironment in which the snowflake grows changes dynamically as the snowflake falls through the cloud and tiny changes in temperature and humidity affect the way in which water molecules attach to the snowflake. Since the micro-environment (and its changes) are very nearly identical around the snowflake, each arm tends to grow in nearly the same way. However, being in the same micro-environment does not guarantee that each arm grows the same; indeed, for some crystal forms it does not because the underlying crystal growth mechanism also affects how fast each surface region of a crystal grows.

Empirical studies suggest less than 0.1% of snowflakes exhibit the ideal six-fold symmetric shape. Very occasionally twelve branched snowflakes are observed; they maintain the six-fold symmetry.

== Classification ==
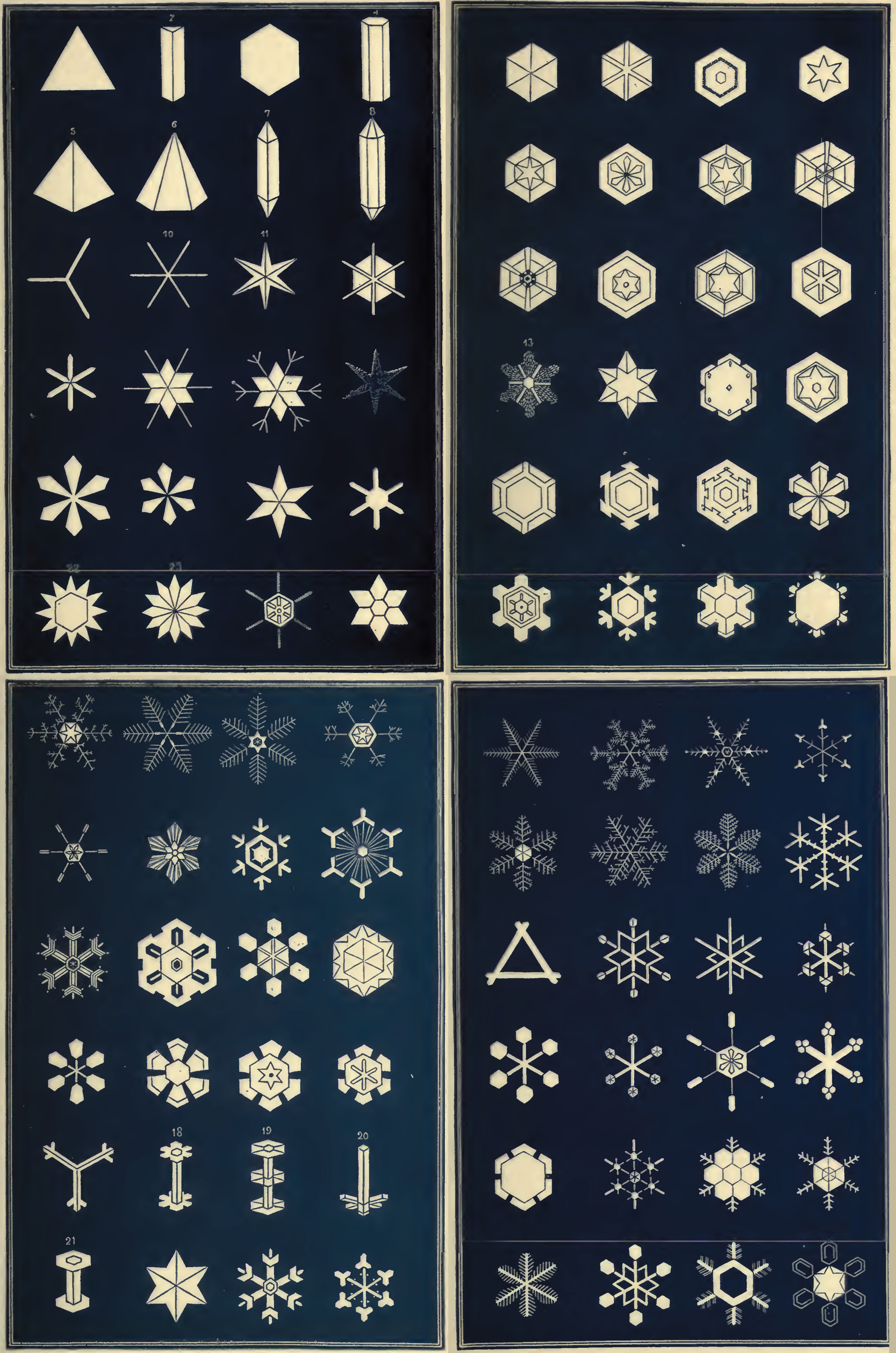
An early classification of snowflakes by Israel Perkins Warren

Snowflakes form in a wide variety of intricate shapes, leading to the notion that "no two are alike". Although nearly-identical snowflakes have been made in laboratories, they are very unlikely to be found in nature. Initial attempts to find identical snowflakes by photographing thousands of them with a microscope from 1885 onward by Wilson Alwyn Bentley found the wide variety of snowflakes we know about today.

Ukichiro Nakaya developed a crystal morphology diagram, relating crystal shape to the temperature and moisture conditions under which they formed, which is summarized in the following table:

Crystal structure morphology as a function of temperature and water saturation
Temperature range	Saturation range (g/m^{3})	Types of snow crystal below saturation	Types of snow crystal above saturation
0 °C (32 °F) to −3.5 °C (26 °F)	0.0 to 0.5	Solid plates	Thin plates Dendrites
−3.5 °C (26 °F) to −10 °C (14 °F)	0.5 to 1.2	Solid prisms Hollow prisms	Hollow prisms Needles
−10 °C (14 °F) to −22 °C (−8 °F)	1.2 to 1.2	Thin plates Solid plates	Sectored plates Dendrites
−22 °C (−8 °F) to −40 °C (−40 °F)	0.0 to 0.4	Thin plates Solid plates	Columns Prisms

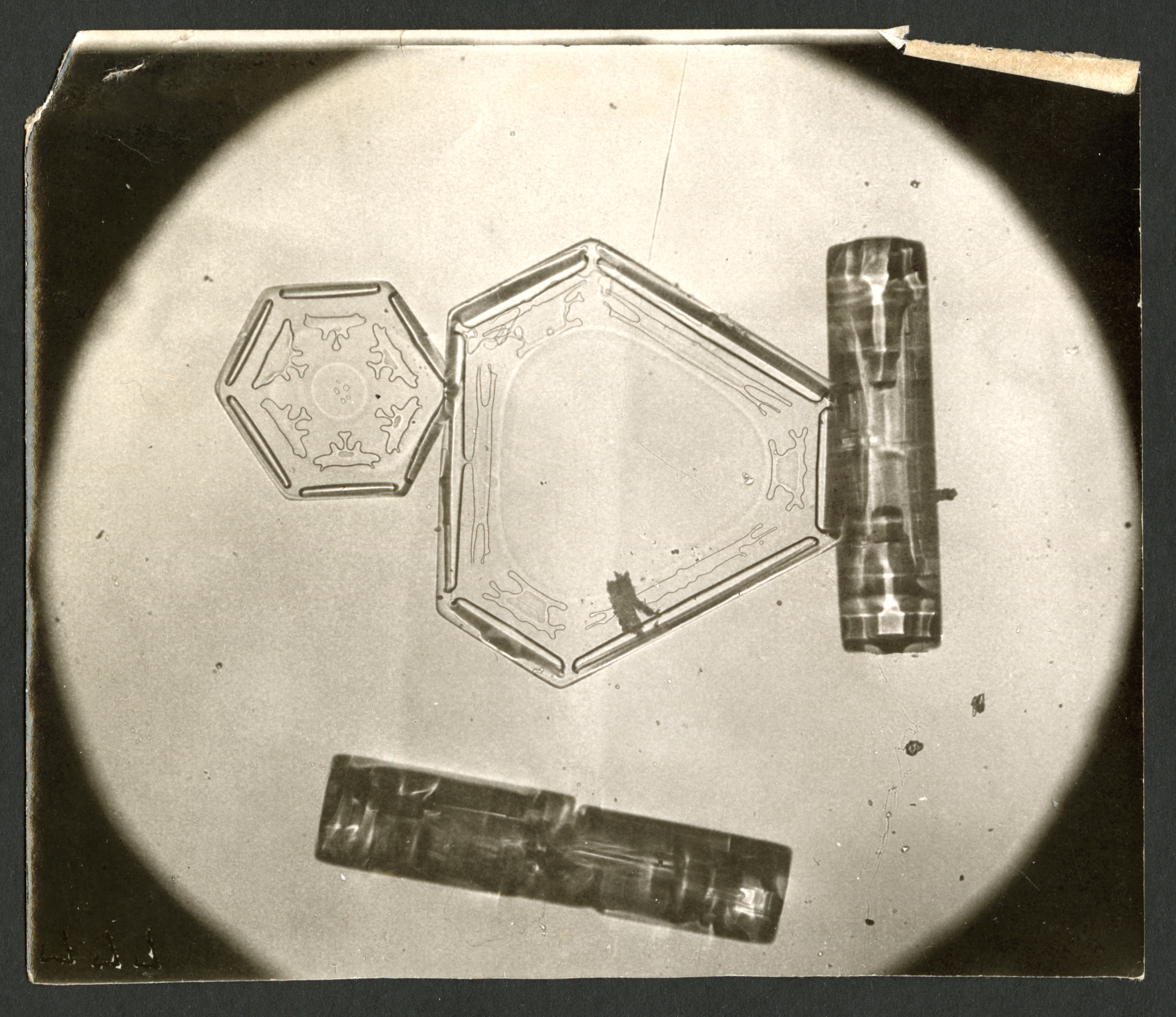
Wilson Bentley micrograph showing two classes of snowflake, plate and column. Missing is an example of a needle.

The shape of a snowflake is determined primarily by the temperature and humidity at which it is formed. Freezing air down to −3 °C (27 °F) promotes planar crystals (thin and flat). In colder air down to −8 °C (18 °F), the crystals form as hollow columns, prisms or needles. In air as cold as −22 °C (−8 °F), shapes become plate-like again, often with branched or dendritic features. At temperatures below −22 °C (−8 °F), the crystals become plate-like or columnar, depending on the degree of saturation. As Nakaya discovered, shape is also a function of whether the prevalent moisture is above or below saturation. Forms below the saturation line trend more towards solid and compact. Crystals formed in supersaturated air trend more towards lacy, delicate and ornate. Many more complex growth patterns also form such as side-planes, bullet-rosettes and also planar types depending on the conditions and ice nuclei. If a crystal has started forming in a column growth regime, at around −5 °C (23 °F), and then falls into the warmer plate-like regime, then plate or dendritic crystals sprout at the end of the column, producing so called "capped columns".

Magono and Lee devised a classification of freshly formed snow crystals that includes 80 distinct shapes. They are listed in the following main categories (with symbol):

- Needle crystal (N) – Subdivided into: Simple and combination of needles
- Columnar crystal (C) – Subdivided into: Simple and combination of columns
- Plate crystal (P) – Subdivided into: Regular crystal in one plane, plane crystal with extensions, crystal with irregular number of branches, crystal with 12 branches, malformed crystal, radiating assemblage of plane branches
- Combination of columnar and plate crystals (CP) – Subdivided into: Column with plane crystal at both ends, bullet with plane crystals, plane crystal with spatial extensions at ends
- Columnar crystal with extended side planes (S) – Subdivided into: Side planes, scalelike side planes, combination of side planes, bullets, and columns
- Rimed crystal (R) – Subdivided into: Rimed crystal, densely rimed crystal, graupellike crystal, graupel
- Irregular snow crystal (I) – Subdivided into: Ice particle, rimed particle, broken piece from a crystal, miscellaneous
- Germ of snow crystal (G) – Subdivided into: Minute column, germ of skeleton form, minute hexagonal plate, minute stellar crystal, minute assemblage of plates, irregular germ

They documented each with micrographs.

The International Classification for Seasonal Snow on the Ground describes snow crystal classification, once it is deposited on the ground, that include grain shape and grain size. The system also characterizes the snowpack, as the individual crystals metamorphize and coalesce.

== Use as a symbol ==
Snowflake in the coat of arms of Lumijoki

Snowflakes are also often used as symbols representing winter or cold conditions. For example, snow tires which enhance traction during harsh winter driving conditions are labelled with a snowflake on the mountain symbol. A stylized snowflake has been part of the emblem of the 1968 Winter Olympics, 1972 Winter Olympics, 1984 Winter Olympics, 1988 Winter Olympics, 1998 Winter Olympics and 2002 Winter Olympics.

The snowflake is often a traditional seasonal image or motif used around the Christmas season, especially in Europe and North America. As a Christian celebration, Christmas celebrates the incarnation of Jesus, who according to Christian belief atones for the sins of humanity; so, in European and North American Christmas traditions, snowflakes symbolize purity. Snowflakes are also traditionally associated with the "White Christmas" weather that often occurs during Christmastide.

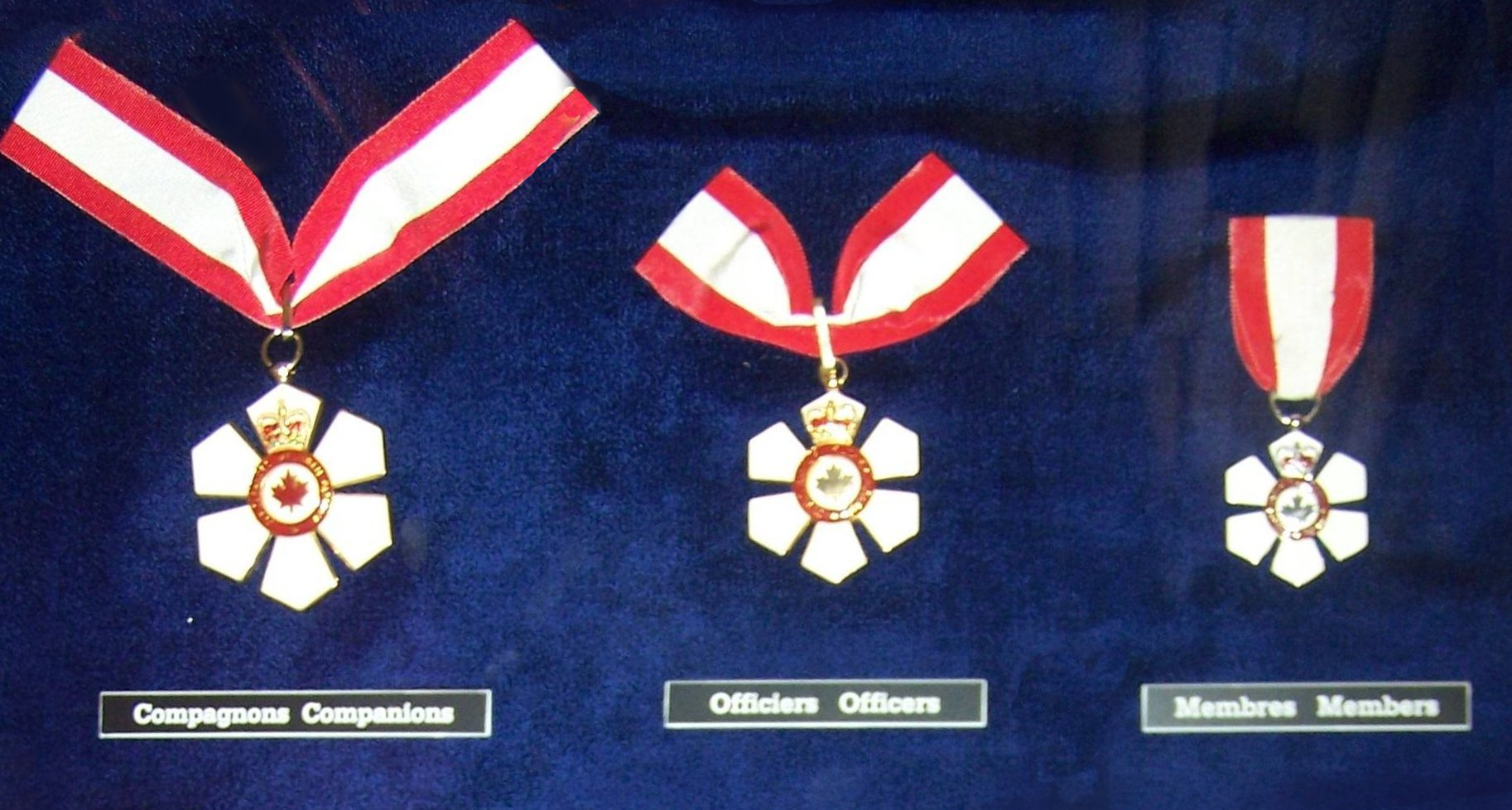
The three grades in the Order of Canada (Companion, Officer and Member, respectively)

A six pointed stylized hexagonal snowflake used for the Order of Canada (a national honor system) has come to symbolize Canadians' northern heritage and diversity.

In the Tang Dynasty, snowflakes in poetry sometimes served as a symbol of the cosmic energy of the Tao and the Milky Way galaxy.

Three different snowflake symbols are encoded in Unicode: "snowflake" at U+2744 (❄); "tight trifoliate snowflake" at U+2745 (❅); and "heavy chevron snowflake" at U+2746 (❆).

== Gallery ==
A selection of photographs taken by Wilson Bentley (1865–1931):

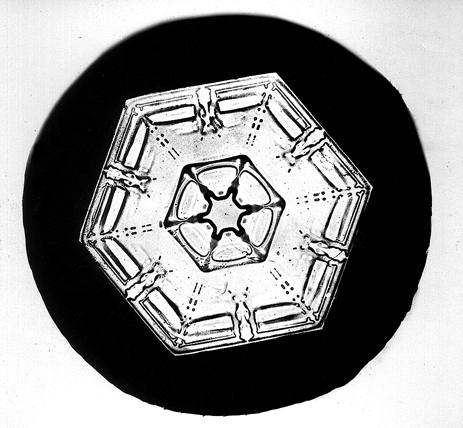

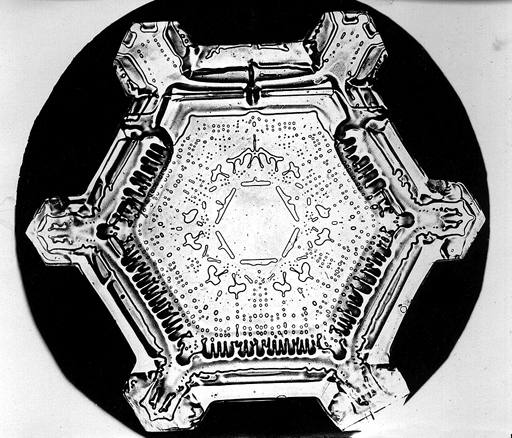

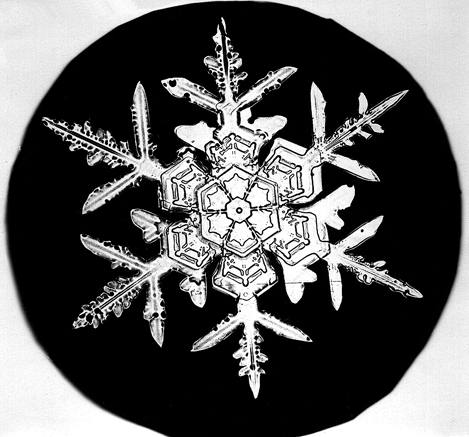

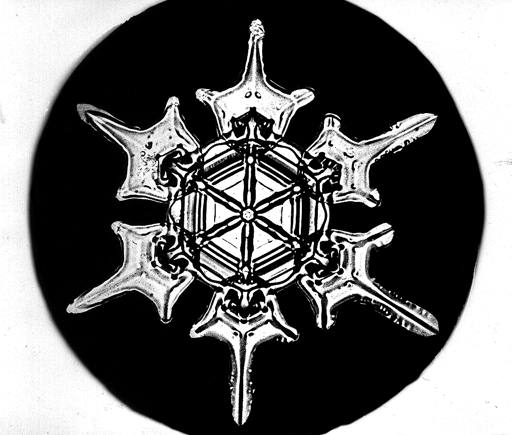

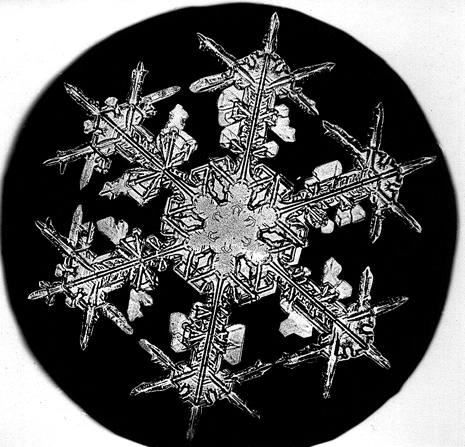

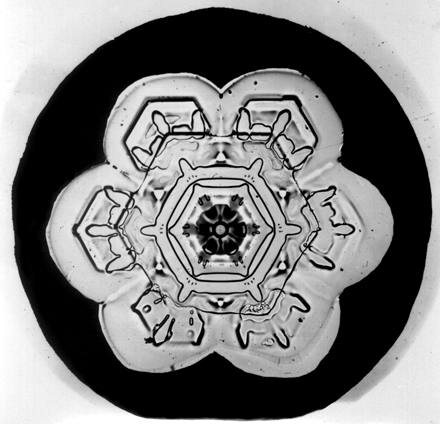

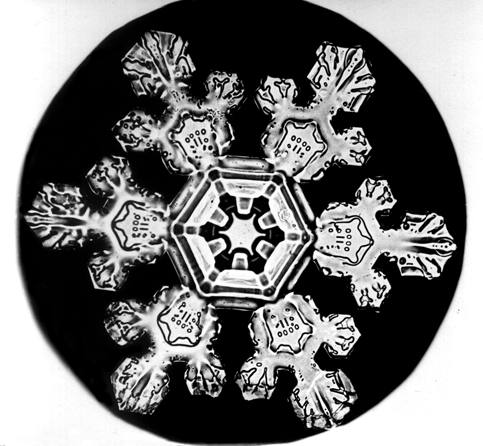

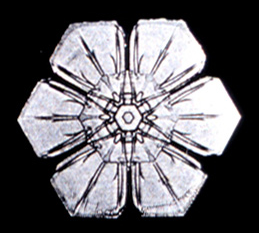

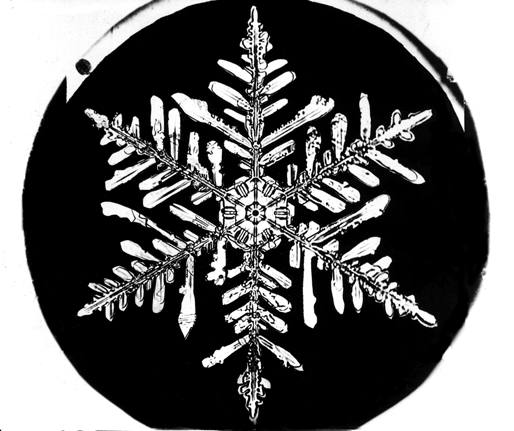

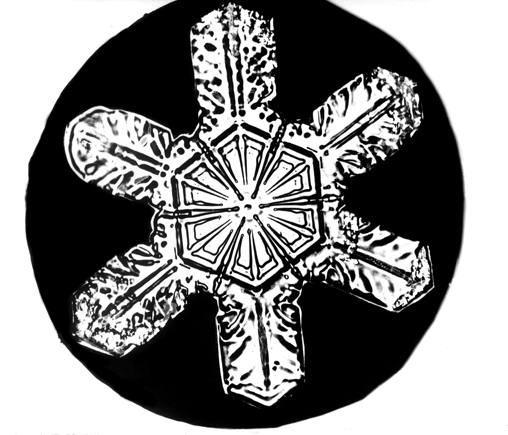

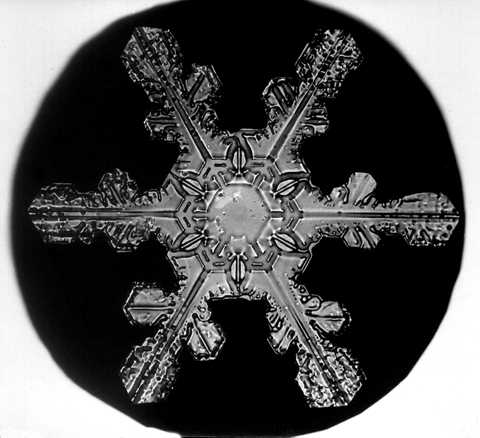

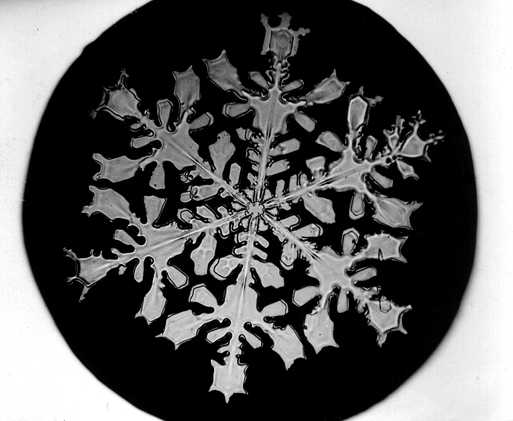

Comprehensive photographic studies of fresh snowflakes show the simple symmetry represented in Bentley's photographs to be rare.

== See also ==
- Koch snowflake – Mathematical curve resembling a snowflake
- Sekka Zusetsu – Guide to snowflake forms written in Japan in the 19th century
- Selburose — An eight-pointed floral design that may be mistaken for a snowflake
- Timeline of snowflake research
