= Yumi =

Japanese asymmetrical bow

Yumi (弓)
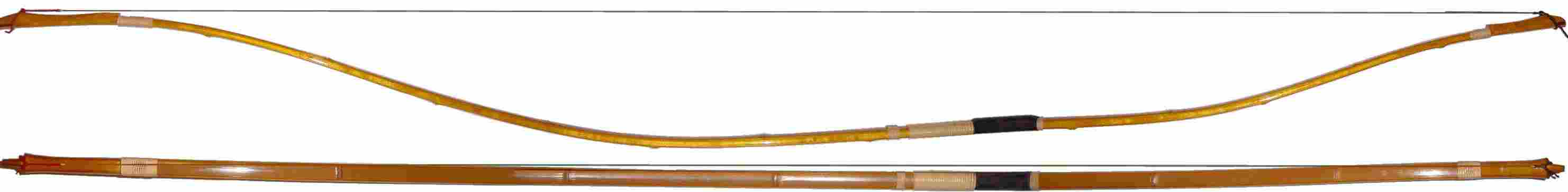
- Yumi from behind, profile
- Type: Asymmetrical bow
- Place of origin: Japan

Service history
- Used by: Samurai, Onna-musha, Kyudo practitioners

Production history
- Produced: Since 3rd century (the asymmetrical yumi)
- Variants: Hankyū

Specifications
- Length: 212–245 cm (83–96 in)
- Cartridge: Arrow length: 85–110 cm (33–43 in)

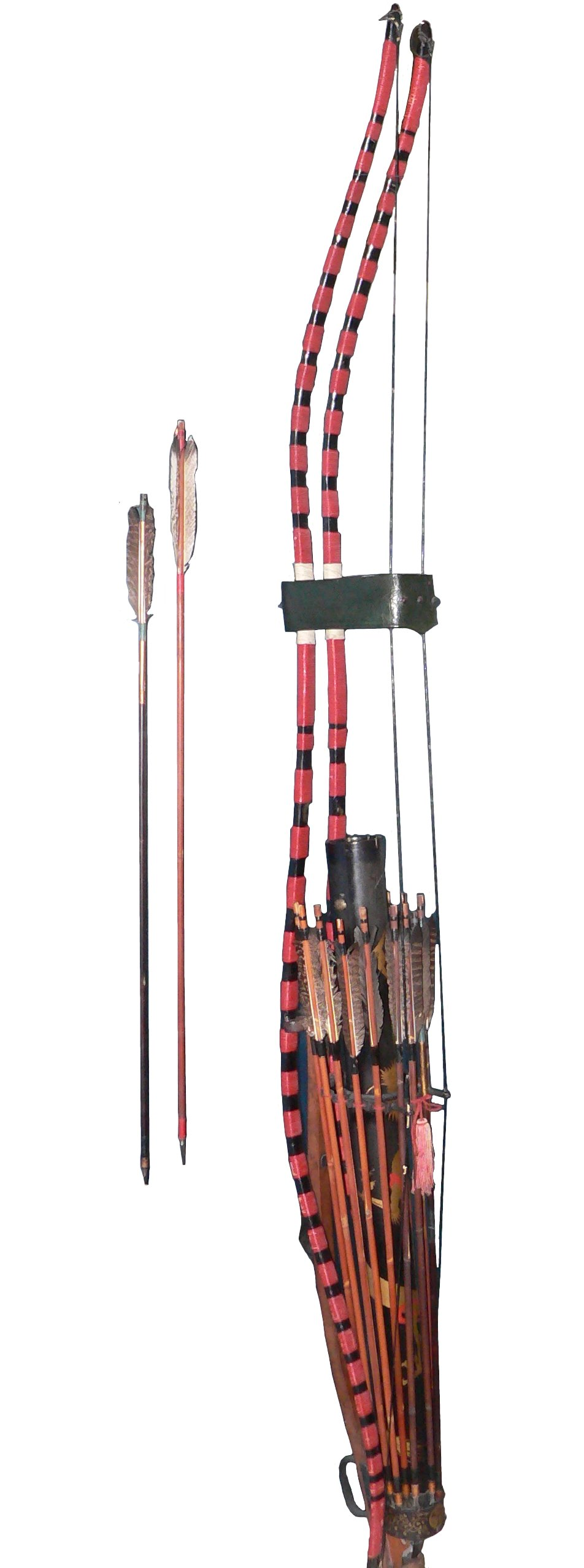
Japanese bows, arrows, and arrow-stand

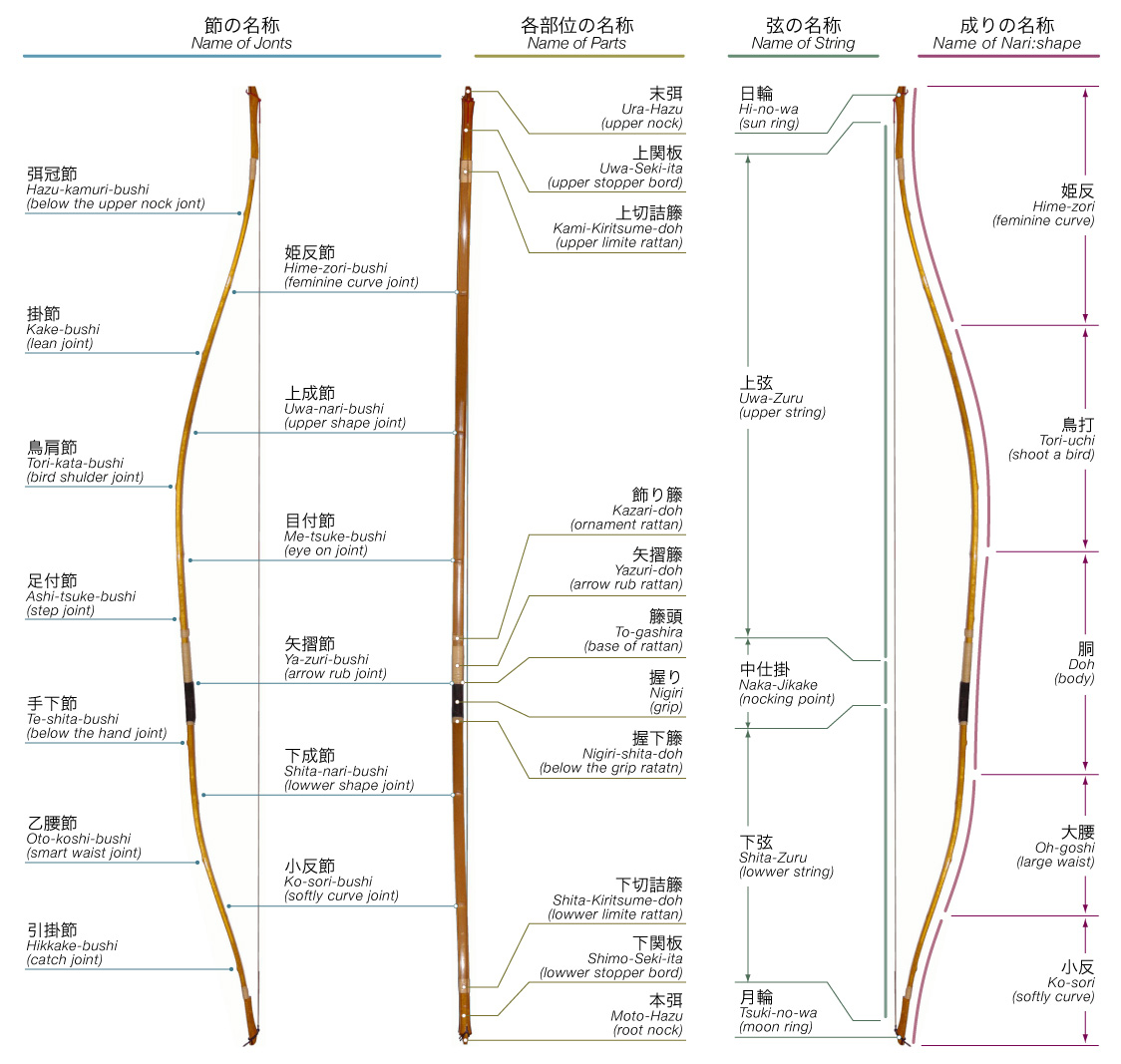
Yumi bow names

Yumi (弓) is the Japanese term for a bow. As used in English, yumi refers more specifically to traditional Japanese asymmetrical bows, and includes the longer daikyū (大弓) and the shorter hankyū (半弓) used in the practice of kyūdō and kyūjutsu, or Japanese archery.

The yumi was an important weapon of the samurai warrior during the feudal period of Japan. It is typically shot with Japanese arrows known as ya.

The most famous style of yumi is an asymmetrically shaped long bow with a length of more than 2 m (6 ft 7 in), characterized by the archer holding the part of the bow below the center to shoot the arrow.

== History ==
Bows discovered in excavations from the Jōmon period (c. 14,000–300 BCE) 1.2 to 1.6 metres (3 ft 11 in to 5 ft 3 in) in length, while those of the Yayoi period (c. 3rd century BCE–2nd/3rd century CE) tend to be 2 to 2.3 metres (6 ft 7 in to 7 ft 7 in) in length. The bows from these periods were made from a single processed piece of wood, and bows of this structure, known as maruki yumi (丸木弓), were used until the Nara period (710–794 CE). It is not known precisely when the asymmetrical yumi came into use, but the first written record is found in the Book of Wei, a Chinese historical manuscript dated to the 3rd century CE, which describes the people of the Japanese islands using "spears, shields, and wooden bows for arms; the wooden bows are made with the lower limbs short and the upper limbs long; and bamboo arrows with points of either iron or bone." The oldest asymmetrical yumi extant was discovered in Nara Prefecture, and is estimated to date from the 5th century.

Some of the bows found as funerary items in kofun (ancient tombs) during the Kofun period (300–538 CE) were decorated with gold or silver, and may have had a ceremonial use. Bows of this period ranged between 70 to 150 cm (28 to 59 in) in length, and were powerful enough to shoot enemies and animals at close range.

In the Nara period, lacquered bows with more weather resistance and decorative features began to appear. Euonymus hamiltonianus, Zelkova serrata, and Toxicodendron succedaneum, highly elastic varieties of wood, were used for making yumi, and some yumi were as long as roughly 7 shaku 3 sun (2.21 m (7 ft 3 in)), increasing their power and range. Since then, the structure of the bow has gradually evolved, but the length of roughly 7 shaku 3 sun has become a constant.

From the mid to late Heian period (794–1185), the Japanese developed the fusedake no yumi (伏竹弓) style of yumi, the first yumi in Japan with a laminated structure. This style of yumi was made by attaching bamboo to a wooden yumi with a flat front side using a fish-based glue, and the elasticity of the bamboo improved the bow's range, power and durability. Nasu no Yoichi found fame as a master of archery in the late Heian period; his noteriety was depicted in The Tale of the Heike and Genpei Seisuiki, he was the subject of various Japanese traditional performing arts and fine arts such as Noh, kyogen, kodan, kabuki, and ukiyo-e of later generations.

At the end of the Heian period to the beginning of the Kamakura period (1185–1333), the sanmaiuchi no yumi (三枚打弓) was developed, and bamboo was glued not only on the front side, but also on the reverse of the yumi. In the late Kamakura period, the shape of the bow became more asymmetrical, with the upper part bent from the lower part, so that it resembled the modern bow, further increasing the range and power of the yumi.

In the middle of the Heian period, the tōyumi (籐弓) style of yumi – in which rattan was wrapped around a laminated-structure yumi to improve its elasticity and sturdiness – became popular. The shigetō yumi (重籐) style yumi in particular was considered the strongest weapon of the Kamakura period, with a maximum range of 400 metres (1,300 ft) and an effective range of 80 metres (260 ft), at which it could inflict fatal wounds on targets. There are more than 20 varieties of shigetō yumi, depending on the manner in which the rattan is wound on the bow. In the Muromachi period (1336–1573), the shigetō yumi became a symbol of the rank of commander.

During the Kamakura period, when the samurai class came to power, kyūjutsu (archery) expereinced an increase in popularity, particularly the three kinds of mounted archery: yabusame, inuoumono, and kasagake.

During the Muromachi period the shihodake no yumi (四方竹弓) developed further on the concept of the fusedake no yumi (伏竹弓), with bamboo being used on the side of the bow to increase its range and power still further.

The higoyumi (弓胎弓), used in modern kyūdō, was developed during the Sengoku period (1467–1615), representing the original form of the Japanese bow now known around the world. The characteristic of the bow is that it has a greatly changed laminated structure from the conventional bow. The core of the structure is about four pieces of bonded bamboo, with bamboo glued to the front side and the other side and wood glued to the sides. This improved the range and power of the bow and enabled it to shoot through targets 132 metres (433 ft) away in the Sanjusangen-do archery contest, Tōshiya, a famous event still held today. Research on yajiri (arrowheads) was actively conducted to enhance their killing ability, and yajiri of various shapes were developed. During this period, the tanegashima was mass-produced by Japanese swordsmiths, and mobilized ashigaru (foot soldiers) used them to exert tremendous power on the battlefield. However, because tanegashima took a long time to load, were inconvenient in rainy weather when damp gunpowder would not fire, and utterly lacked subtlety in use due to their extraordinary noisiness, the yumi did not go out of fashion and continued to be used as an important military force on the battlefield.

When Japanese society entered into a period of relative peace in the Edo period (1603–1867), the spirituality and decorativeness of the yumi became important, and kyūjutsu developed as a samurai's way of doing things.

Today, the yumi is used in kyūdō and ceremonies, and in Grand sumo tournaments, a ceremony called the yumitori shiki (弓取り式), which is dedicated to Shinto kami, is held.

Time period	Type of bow	Bow formation
Prehistoric	Maruki	Single piece of wood
c. 800–900	Fusetake or Fusedake	Wood with bamboo front
c. 1100	Sanmaiuchi	Wood with bamboo front and back
c. 1300–1400	Shihochiku or Shihodake	Wood surrounded with bamboo
c. 1550	Sanbonhigo (Higoyumi)	Three-piece bamboo laminate core, wooden sides, bamboo front and back
c. 1600	Yohonhigo (Higoyumi)	Four-piece bamboo laminate core, wooden sides, bamboo front and back
c. 1650	Gohonhigo (Higoyumi)	Five-piece bamboo (or bamboo and wood) laminate core, wooden sides, bamboo front and back
c. 1971–Modern times	Glass fiber	Wooden laminate core, FRP front and back

== Shape ==
The yumi is exceptionally tall, standing over 2 m (6 ft 7 in) in height, and typically surpasses the height of the archer (射手, ite). They are traditionally made by laminating bamboo, wood and leather, using techniques which have not changed for centuries, although some archers (particularly beginners) may use a synthetic yumi.

The yumi is asymmetrical; according to the All Nippon Kyudo Federation, the grip (nigiri (握り, lit. 'grip; handle; handful')) has to be positioned at about two thirds of the distance from the upper tip.

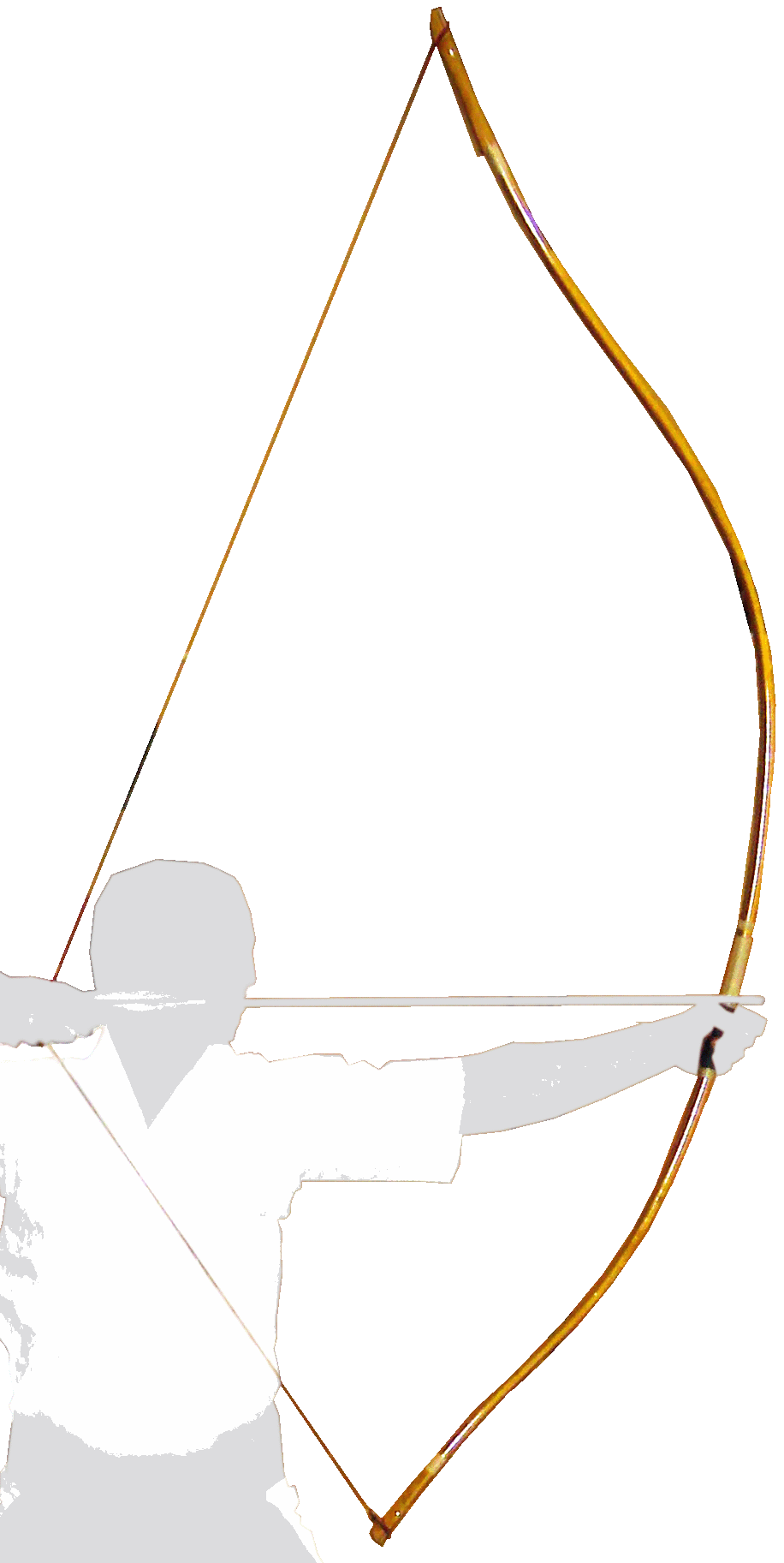
Scale representation of a drawn yumi

The upper and lower curves also differ. Several hypotheses have been offered for this asymmetric shape. Some believe it was designed for use on a horse, where the yumi could be moved from one side of the horse to the other with ease; however, there is evidence that the asymmetrical shape predates its use on horseback.

Others claim that asymmetry was needed to enable shooting from a kneeling position. Yet another explanation is the characteristics of the wood from a time before laminating techniques. In case the bow is a self bow, or made from a single piece of wood, its modulus of elasticity is different between the part taken from the treetop side and the other side. A lower grip balances it.

The hand holding the yumi may also experience less vibration due to the grip being on a vibration node of the bow. A perfectly uniform pole has nodes at 1/4 and 3/4 of the way from the ends, or 1/2 if held taut at the ends – these positions will change significantly with shape and consistency of the bow material.

== String ==
The string of a yumi, a tsuru (弦, lit. 'yumi bowstring'), is traditionally made of hemp, although most modern archers will use strings made of synthetic materials such as Kevlar, which will last longer.

The nocking-point on the string is built up through the application of hemp and glue to protect the string and to provide a thickness which helps hold the nock (hazu (筈/弭, lit. '[Japanese arrow] nock/notch') of the arrow, a ya (矢, lit. '[Japanese] arrow'), in place while drawing the yumi. However, it can also be made of strands of waxed bamboo.

== Care and maintenance ==
A bamboo yumi requires careful attention. Left unattended, the yumi can warp out of shape and may eventually become unusable. The shape of a yumi will change through normal use and can be re-formed when needed through manual application of pressure, through shaping blocks, or by leaving it strung or unstrung when not in use.

The shape of the curves of a yumi is greatly affected by whether it is left strung or unstrung when not in use. The decision to leave a yumi strung or unstrung depends upon the current shape of the yumi. A yumi that is relatively flat when unstrung will usually be left unstrung when not in use (a yumi in this state is sometimes referred to as being 'tired'). A yumi that has excessive curvature when unstrung is typically left strung for a period of time to 'tame' the yumi.

A well cared-for yumi can last many generations, while the usable life of a mistreated yumi can be very short.

== Bow lengths ==
Height of archer	Arrow length	Suggested bow length
<150 cm (59 in)	<85 cm (33 in)	Sansun-zume (212 cm (83 in))
150–165 cm (59–65 in)	85–90 cm (33–35 in)	Namisun (221 cm (87 in))
165–180 cm (65–71 in)	90–100 cm (35–39 in)	Nisun-nobi (227 cm (89 in))
180–195 cm (71–77 in)	100–105 cm (39–41 in)	Yonsun-nobi (233 cm (92 in))
195–205 cm (77–81 in)	105–110 cm (41–43 in)	Rokusun-nobi (239 cm (94 in))
>205 cm (81 in)	>110 cm (43 in)	Hassun-nobi (245 cm (96 in))

== Gallery ==
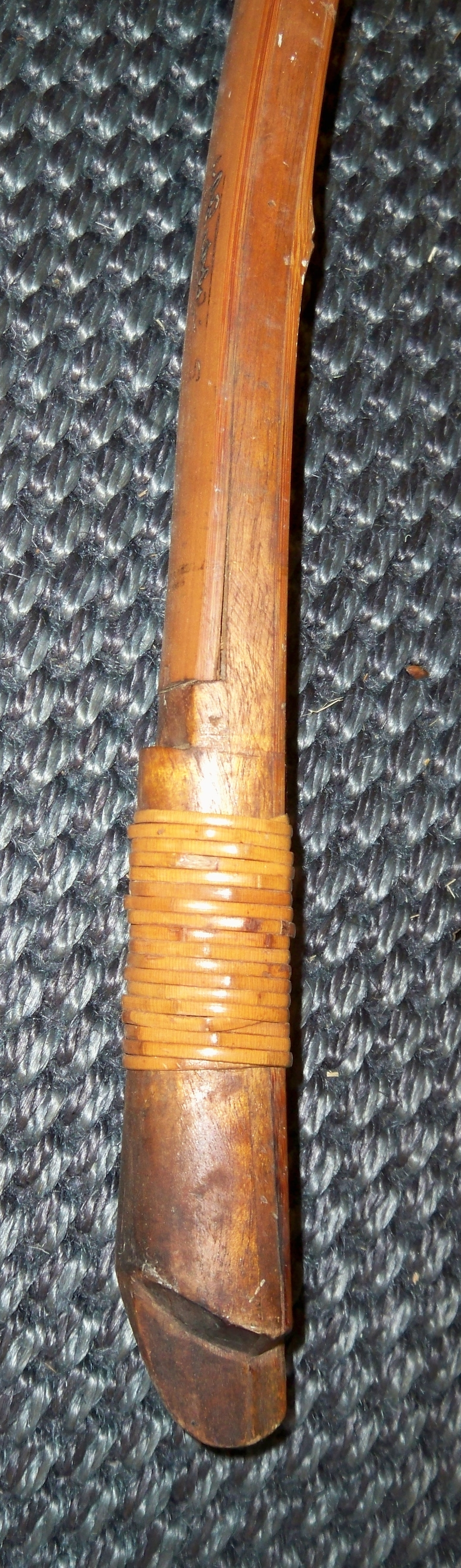
Moto hazu (bottom nock)

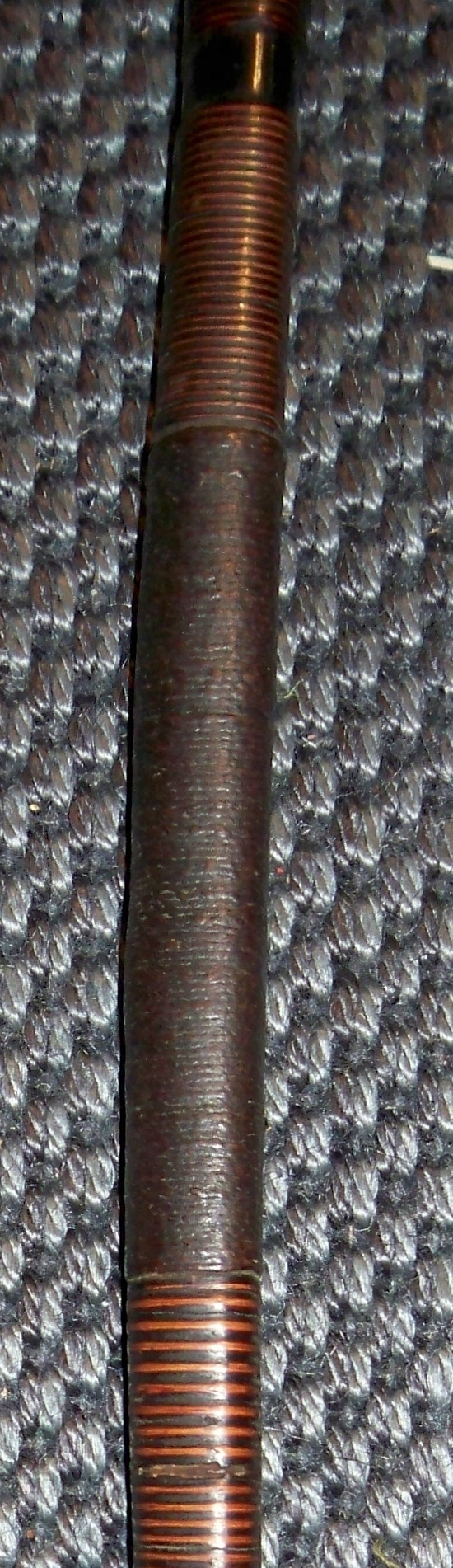
Nigiri (grip)

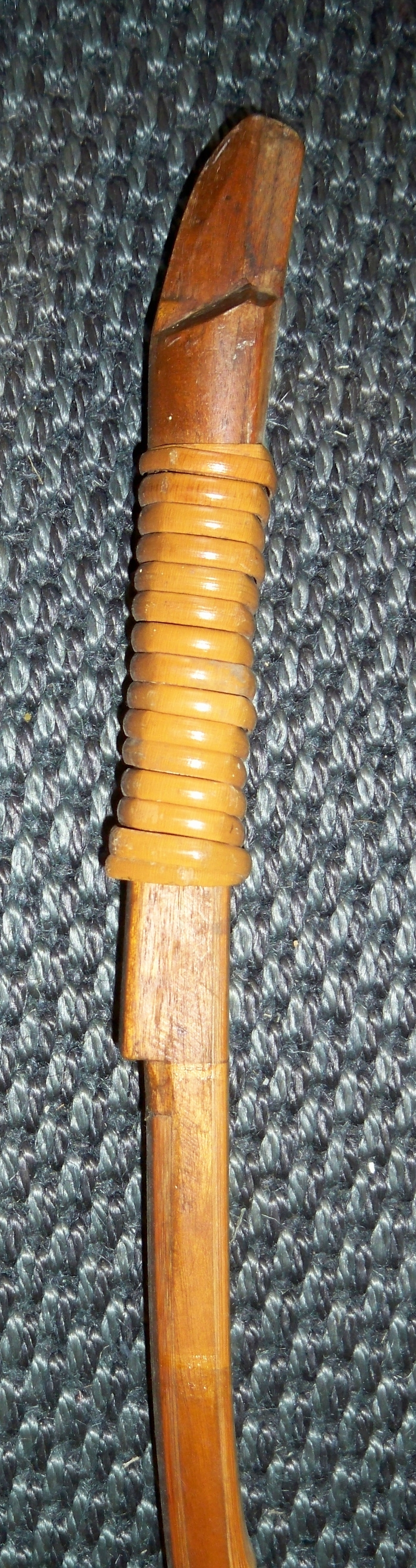
Ura hazu (top nock)

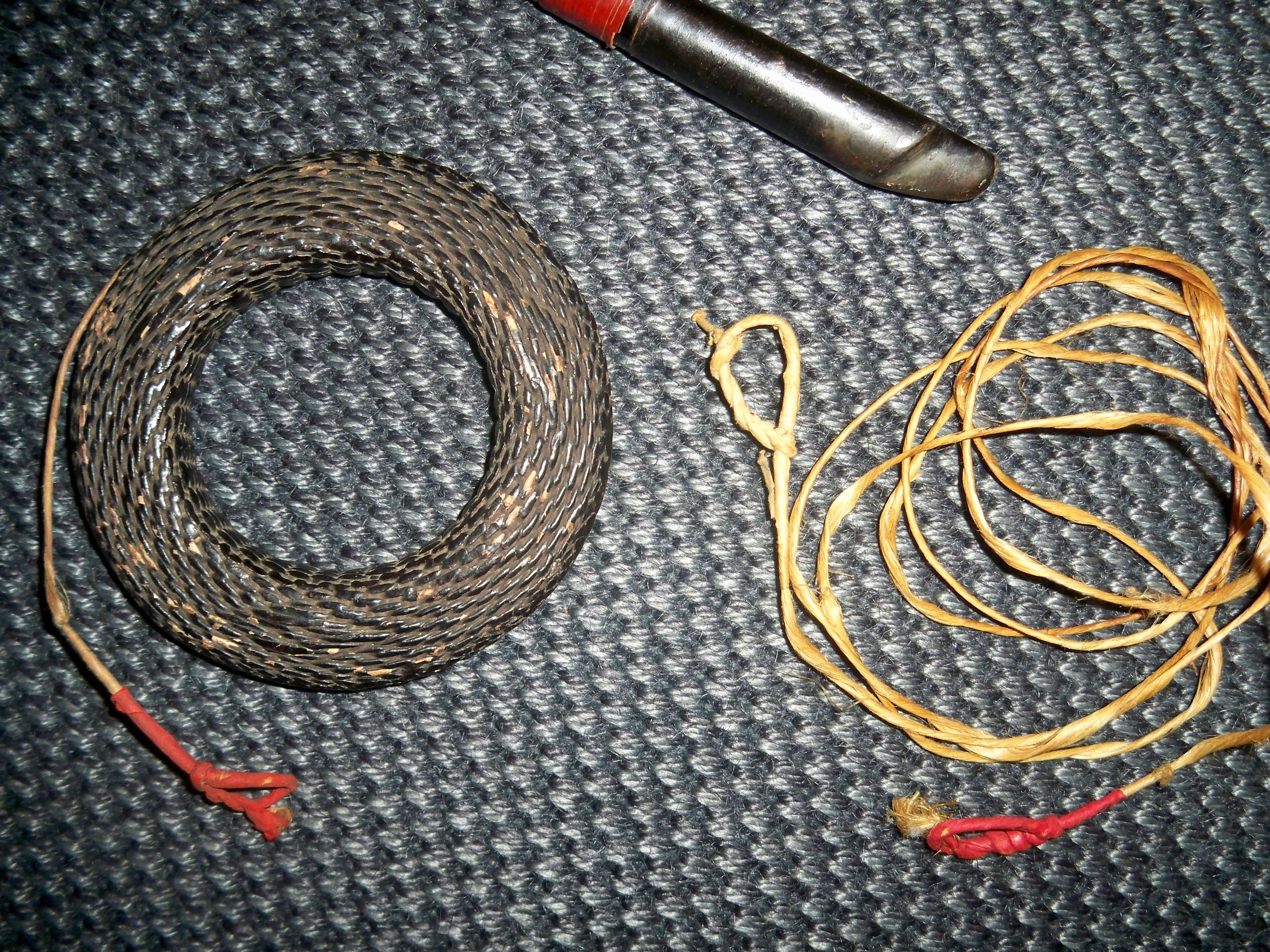
Tsurumaki (string holder) and tsuru (string)

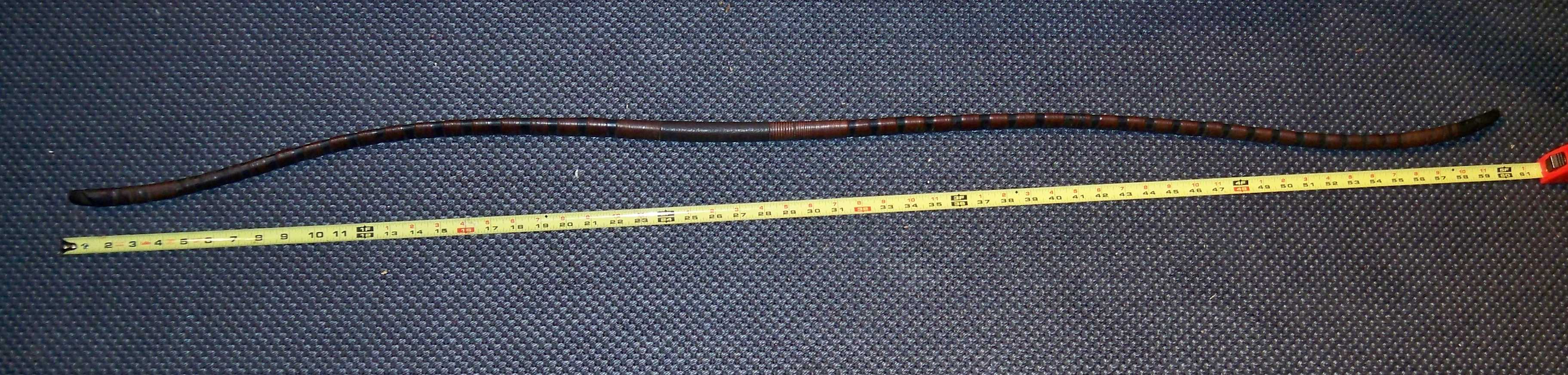
Antique hankyū (shortbow)

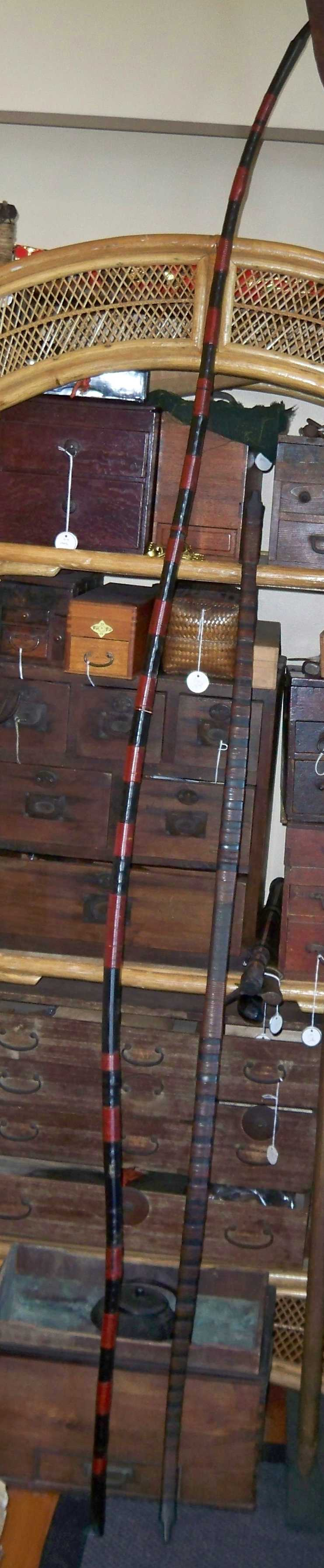
Antique daikyū (longbow) and hankyū (shortbow)

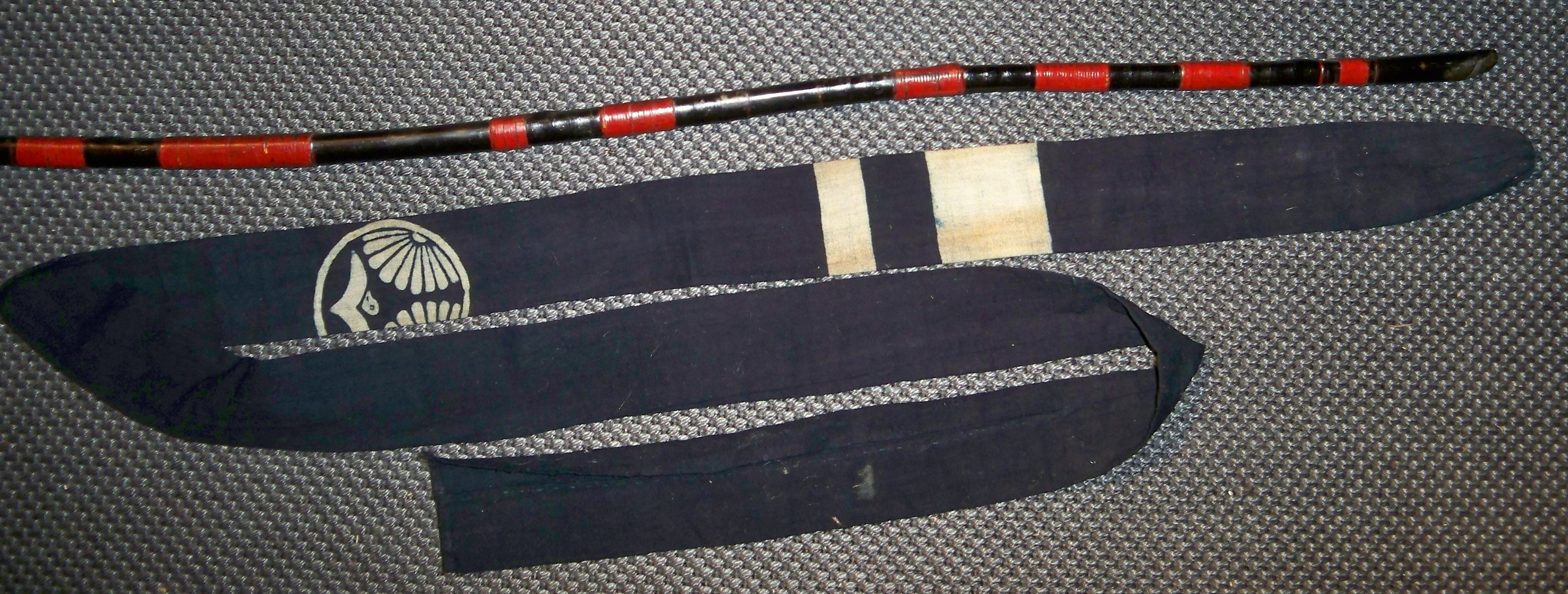
Yumi bukuro (cloth cover)

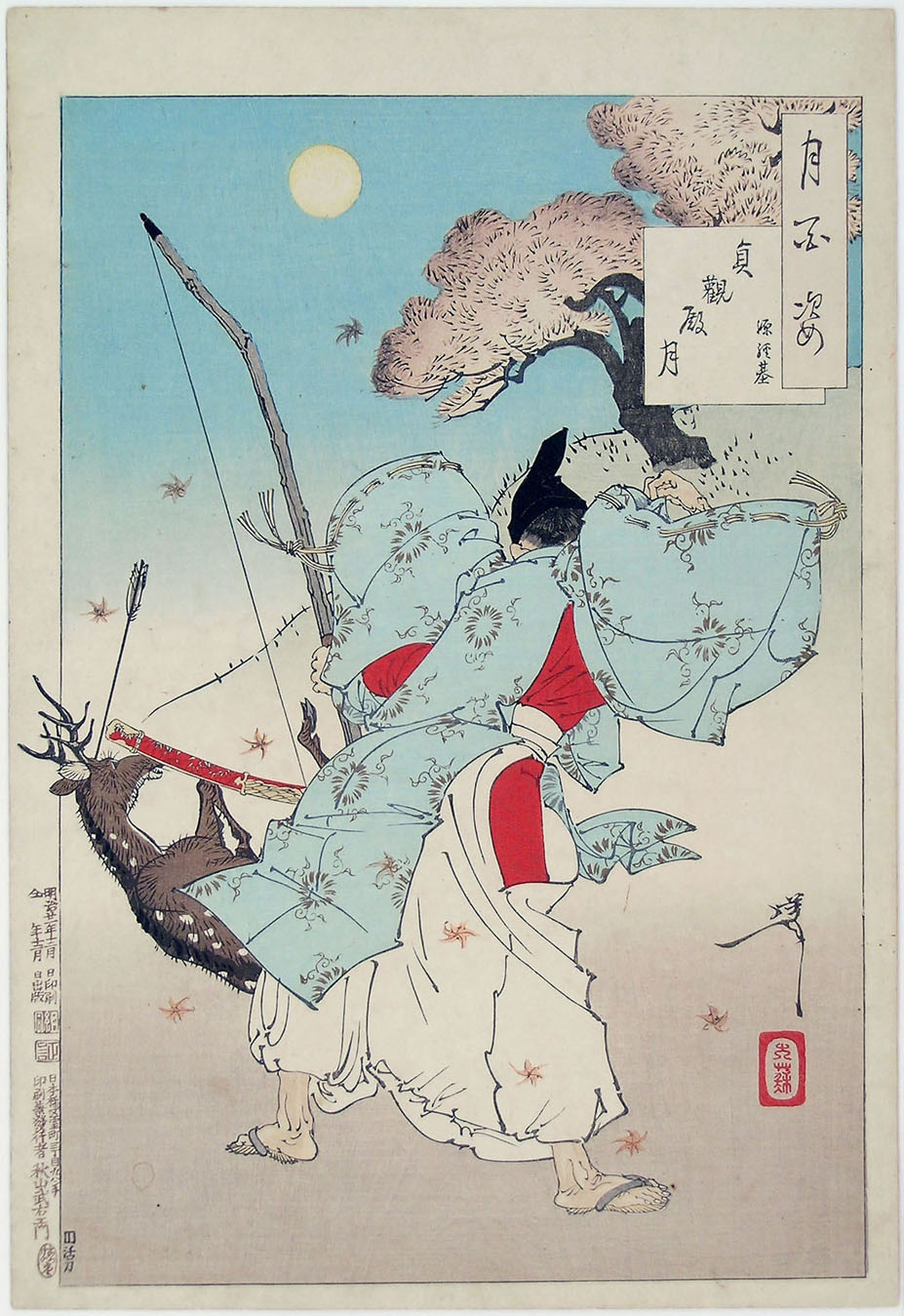
Ukiyo-e by Tsukioka Yoshitoshi depicting Minamoto no Tsunemoto hunting a sika deer with a yumi

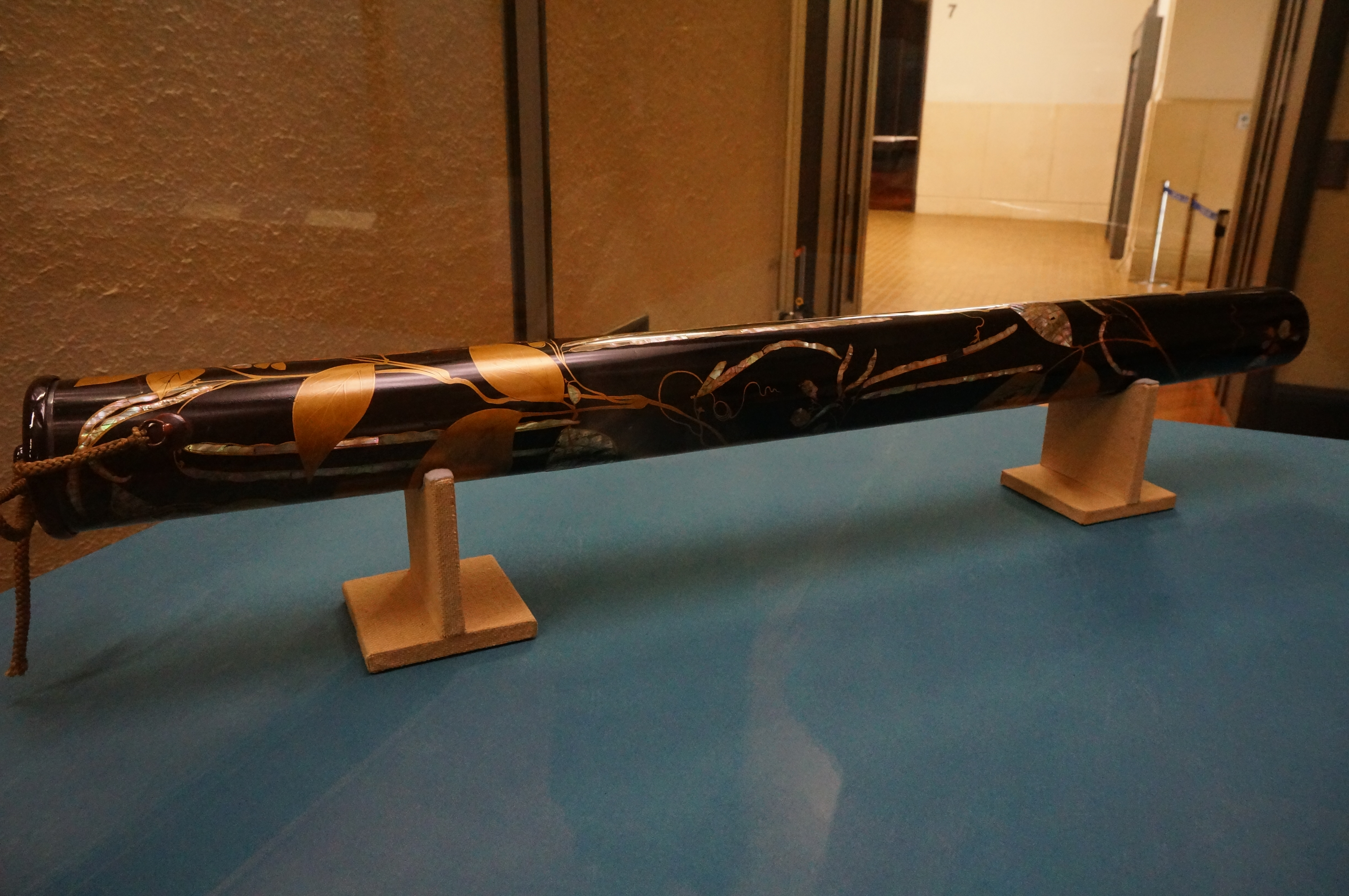
A yazutsu (quiver) decorated with maki-e. Edo period, 18th century. Tokyo National Museum.

== Popular culture ==
- Yumi are featured in the Teenage Mutant Ninja Turtles franchise, used by Splinter in Teenage Mutant Ninja Turtles II: The Secret of the Ooze and the 2003 episode "Exodus, Part 1". The Foot Clan includes Foot Archers who use yumi. Leonardo, Donatello, Raphael, and Michaelangelo occasionally used yumi in the 2012 version, and yumi were also used by Karai, as shown on the flashbacks of the 2003 episode "City At War, part 3". A yumi bow was used by Murakami Gennosuke, a rhino bounty hunter in the 2003 episode "The Real World, Part 1".
- Power Rangers Samurai features the Blue Ranger Kevin Douglas using the Hydro Bow, which is based on a yumi bow.
- Yumi bows were used by samurai in Deadliest Warrior and The Last Samurai.
- The character Hanzo Shimada from Overwatch uses a futuristic yumi as his weapon of choice due to him abandoning the way of the sword after nearly killing his brother Genji.
- Kikyo uses the Yumi bow as her preferred weapon of choice while her younger sister, Kaede did the same thing in her own right before and after her death and resurrection in Inuyasha both the anime and manga series

== See also ==
- Kyūdō (弓道, "way [of the] bow")
- Kyūjutsu (弓術, "bow technique")
- Daikyū (大弓, a "great bow", a long bow)
- Chōkyū (長弓, a "long bow", also a long bow)
- Hankyū (半弓, a "half bow", a short bow)
- Azusa yumi (梓弓, a sacred bow used in certain Shinto rituals)
- Hama yumi (破魔弓, an "evil-destroying bow")
- Saigū yumi (祭宮弓, a "ceremonial bow")
- Ya (矢, an arrow)
- Yabusame
- Kasagake
- Shihan Mato
- Inuoumono
- Tōshiya
