= Kyūjutsu =

Traditional Japanese martial art

Kyūjutsu (弓術)
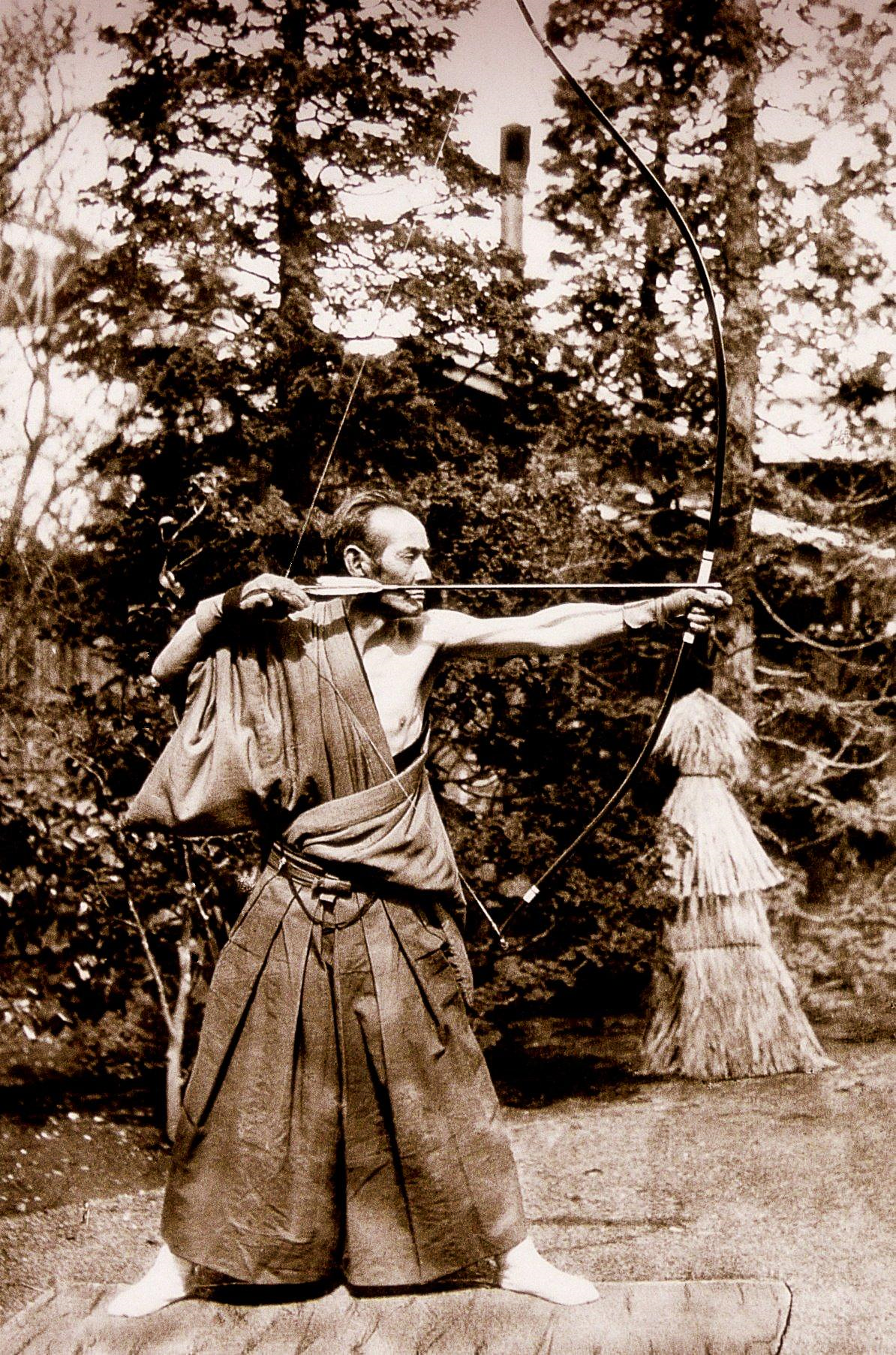
- Focus: Weaponry - Bow
- Hardness: Competitive
- Country of origin: Japan
- Creator: No single creator
- Parenthood: Historical
- Olympic sport: No

Kyūjutsu (弓術) ("art of archery") is the traditional Japanese martial art of wielding a bow (yumi) as practiced by the samurai class of feudal Japan. Although the samurai are perhaps best known for their swordsmanship with a katana (kenjutsu), kyūjutsu was considered a more vital skill for a significant portion of Japanese history. During the majority of the Kamakura period through the Muromachi period (c.1185–c.1568), the bow was almost exclusively the symbol of the professional warrior, and way of life of the warrior was referred to as "the way of the horse and bow" (弓馬の道, kyūba no michi).

== History ==
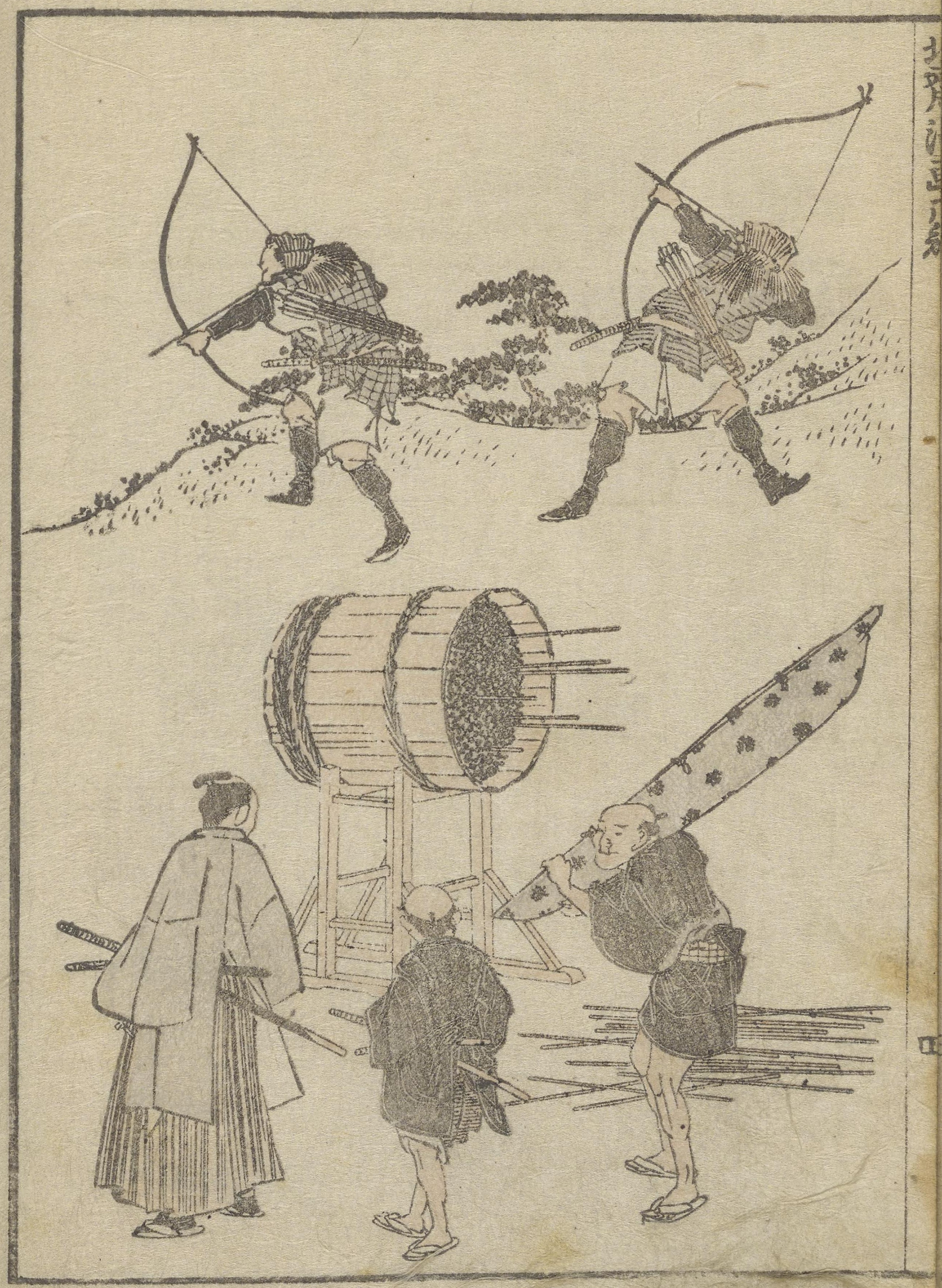
archers practice with a makiwara

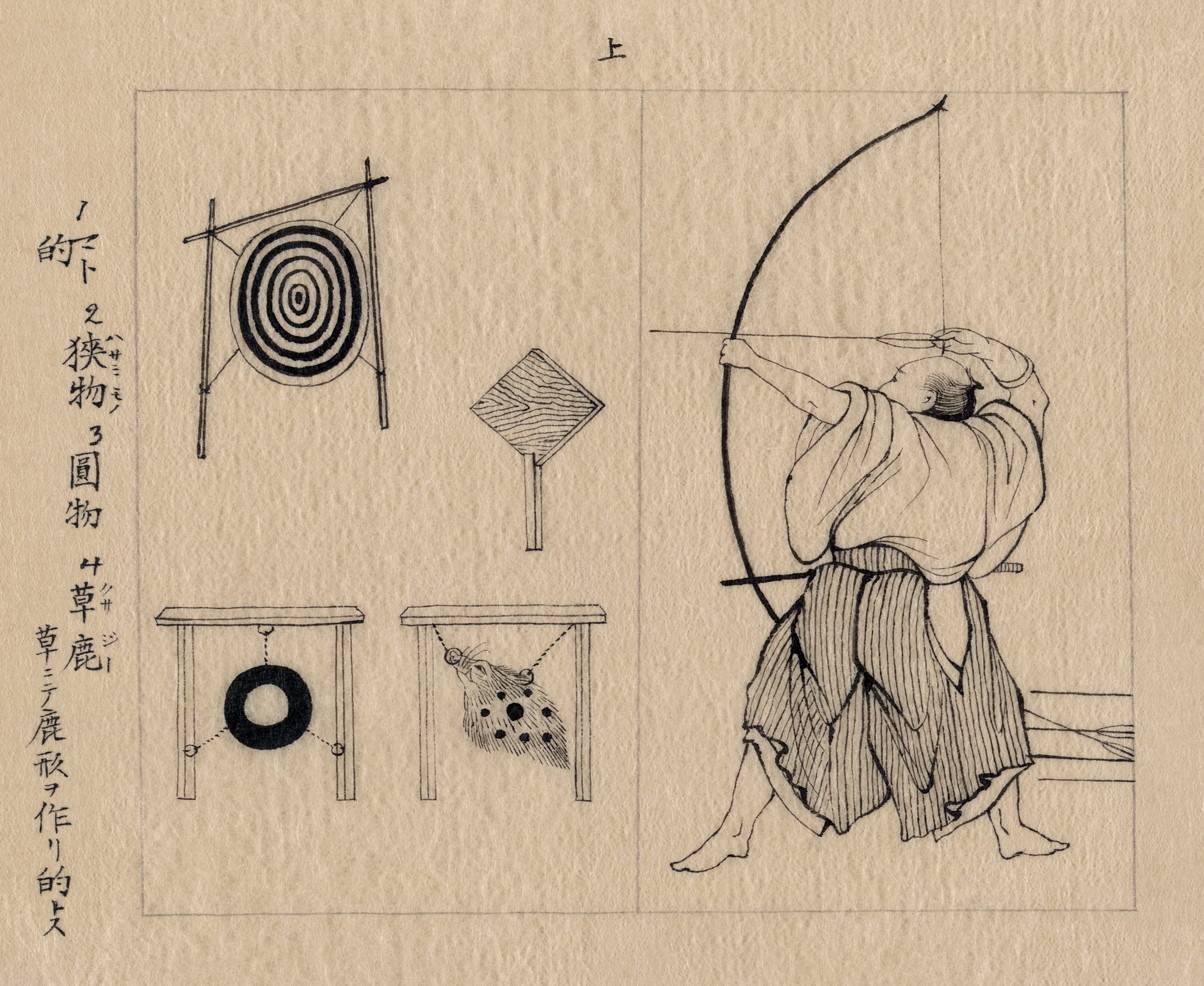
A Japanese archer with targets. Ink on paper, 1878.

The beginning of archery in Japan is, as elsewhere, pre-historical. The first images picturing the distinct Japanese asymmetrical longbow are from the Yayoi period (ca. 500 BC–300 AD). The first written document describing Japanese archery is the Chinese chronicle Weishu (魏書; dated around 297 AD), which tells how in the Japanese isles people use "a wooden bow that is short from the bottom and long from the top."

=== Emergence ===
The changing of society and the military class (samurai) taking power at the end of the Heian period (794－1185) created a requirement for education in archery. This led to the birth of the first kyūjutsu ryūha (流派, style), the Henmi-ryū, founded by Henmi Kiyomitsu (ja:源清光) in the 12th century. The Takeda-ryū (ja:武田流) and the mounted archery school Ogasawara-ryū (ja:小笠原流) were later founded by his descendants. The need for archers grew dramatically during the Genpei War (1180–1185) and as a result the founder of the Ogasawara-ryū (Ogasawara Nagakiyo), began teaching yabusame (mounted archery).

During the Kamakura period (1185–1333), when Minamoto no Yoritomo established the Kamakura shogunate, archery became more and more popular, especially the three types of mounted archery: yabusame, inuoumono, and kasagake.

=== Civil war ===
From the 15th to the 16th century, Japan was ravaged by civil war. In the latter part of the 15th century Heki Danjō Masatsugu revolutionized archery with his new and accurate approach called hi, kan, chū (fly, pierce, center), and his footman's archery spread rapidly. Many new schools were formed, some of which, such as Heki-ryū Chikurin-ha (ja:日置流竹林派), Heki-ryū Sekka-ha (日置流雪荷派) and Heki-ryū Insai-ha (日置流印西派), remain today.

=== 16th century ===
The yumi (Japanese bow) as a weapon of war began its gradual decline after the Portuguese arrived in Japan in 1543 bringing firearms with them in the form of the matchlock. The Japanese soon started to manufacture their own version of the matchlock called tanegashima and eventually the tanegashima and the yari (spear) became the weapons of choice. However, because tanegashima took a long time to load, were inconvenient in rainy weather when damp gunpowder would not fire, and were not exactly subtle in terms of noise, the yumi did not go out of fashion and continued to be used as an important military force on the battlefield.

The tanegashima was far more powerful than the yumi and also did not require as much training, allowing Oda Nobunaga's army consisting mainly of farmers armed with tanegashima to annihilate a traditional samurai cavalry in a single battle in 1575.

=== 17th century–present ===
During the Tokugawa period (1603–1868) Japan was turned inward as a hierarchical caste society in which the samurai were at the top. There was an extended era of peace during which the samurai moved to administrative duty, although the traditional fighting skills were still esteemed. During this period archery became a "voluntary" skill, practiced partly in the court in ceremonial form, partly as different kinds of competition. During this period, an archery contest called Tōshiya was popularly held at the Buddhist temple Sanjusangen-do. Many samurai competed to hit an arrow at a target 133 meters away, nearly the width of the Buddhist temple. Today, this Tōshiya contest is held as an annual event on Coming of Age Day, January 15, with women archers participating, but with the distance to the target shortened to 60 meters.

In the early Edo period, Morikawa Kōzan founded the Yamato-ryū (ja:大和流), which was based on Ogasawara-ryū etiquette and Heiki-ryū shooting methods, and also incorporated Shinto ideas.

During the changes to Japan brought by opening up to the outside world at the beginning of the Meiji era (1868–1912), the samurai lost their status. Therefore, kyūjutsu was considered obsolete and began to decline. Kyūjutsu practitioners established dojos to survive and began to spread among the common people. In 1896, a group of kyūjutsu masters gathered to save traditional archery. Honda Toshizane, the kyūjutsu teacher for the Imperial University of Tokyo, merged the war and ceremonial shooting styles, creating a hybrid called Honda-ryū (ja:本多流生弓会). In 1919, the name of "kyūjutsu" was officially changed to kyūdō, and following the example of other martial arts that have been systematizing for educational purposes, kyūdō also reorganized and integrated various forms of shooting that had been used up until then.

== Koryū (old-school styles) ==
=== Ogasawara-ryū ===
The Ogasawara-ryū (ja:小笠原流) is a school that has been handed down in the Ogasawara clan for generations, and in the middle of the Muromachi period (1336–1573), The school was noted for three things, archery, horsemanship, and etiquette, originally taught by Ogasawara Nagakiyo The Ogasawara-ryū is famous for yabusame. The school performs Shomen-uchiokoshi (正面打起し), one of the bow positions derived from mounted archery in standing archery.

=== Takeda-ryū ===
The Takeda-ryū (ja:武田流) has its origins in the fact that the founder of the school learned archery from the prince of Emperor Montoku. The characteristic of this school is different from other schools in the action of taking arrows out of the yazutsu (quiver) during yabusame. Another characteristic of this school is that they wear a oni mask on their kasa (hat) when they perform yabusame. This school of yabusame is performed at the Meiji Shrine Autumn Festival.

=== Heki-ryū ===
The Heki-ryū (ja:日置流) was founded in the Muromachi period by a samurai, Heki Danjō Masatsugu. This school emphasized actual combat, and the shooting methods of this school influenced other schools. There are also many branches of the Heki school, including the Sekka-ha (雪荷派), Dōsetsu-ha (道雪派), Chikurin-ha (竹林派), Izumo-ha (出雲派), Insai-ha (印西派) and Yoshida-ha (吉田派).

=== Yamato-ryū ===
The Yamato-ryu (ja:大和流) was founded by Morikawa Kozan in the early Edo period (1603－1868). Morikawa Kozan, a student of one of the most prominent families in the school of kyūjutsu, trained for more than 10 years and mastered various styles of kyūjutsu. He established the Yamato-ryū by incorporating Shinto, Buddhist, and Confucian ideas into the kyūjutsu, with the Shinto philosophy he had learned during his training at its core. This school developed by referring to the Ogasawara-ryū for etiquette and the Heki-ryū for shooting techniques.

== Gosha Rokka (Gosha Riku-ka) ==
In combat kyūjutsu at the time just before kyūjutsu was replaced by kyūdo, there were five methods of shooting and six things that were important for the kyūjutsuka (kyūjutsu practitioner) to acquire. These are referred to as the "Gosha Rokka" (Gosha Riku-ka, 五射六科, five shootings and six school subjects).

- Gosha (五射)
  - Waramakimae (藁巻前) - It is a shooting method in which a target made of wrapped straw is shot, and it is a practice shooting method that emphasizes etiquette according to basic techniques.
  - Matomae (的前) - It is a shooting method for short distances of 28 meters or less and is considered the most important shooting method.
  - Tōyamae (遠矢前) - It is a long-distance shooting method and was also used to send a communication letter using a ya (arrow). Letters were tied to the axis of an arrow, pierced with an arrowhead, or inserted into a fusiform part called a hikime (ja:蟇目), which was attached behind the arrowhead.
  - Sashiyamae (差矢前) - It is a shooting method to keep an enemy in check by quickly shooting many arrows.
  - Yōmae (要前) - It is a practical shooting method in which archers wear Japanese armour.
- Rokka (Riku-ka, 六科)
  - Kyūri (弓理) - Theory of Kyūjutsu
  - Kyūrei (弓礼) - Common general knowledge
  - Kyūho (弓法) - How to handle a yumi
  - Kyūki (弓器) - Knowledge of the types of yumi
  - Kyūko (弓工) - Knowledge of yumi performance and knowledge and practice of repair
  - Tanshin (丹心) - Mental training

== See also ==
- Kyūdō – Japanese archery martial art.
  - Yumi – Traditional Japanese bow.
  - Ya (arrow) – Traditional Japanese arrow.
- Yabusame – Japanese archery involving riding a horse.
- Inuoumono – A Japanese sport that involved mounted archers shooting at dogs. The dogs were released into a circular enclosure approximately 15m across, and mounted archers would fire upon them whilst riding around the perimeter.
- Kasagake – A type of Japanese mounted archery; in contrast to yabusame, the types of targets are various and the archer shoots without stopping the horse. While yabusame has been played as a part of formal ceremonies, kasagake has developed as a game or practice of martial arts, focusing on technical elements of horse archery.
- Tōshiya – The Tōshiya, "passing arrow", or "the arrows which hit the target", was an archery exhibition contest held on the west veranda of Sanjūsangen-dō temple in Kyoto, Japan.
- Shihan Mato – A traditional style of Japanese archery using a short bow from a seated position.
- The Japanese culture and lifestyle television show Begin Japanology aired on NHK World featured a full episode on Kyūdō in 2008.
- A European's take on kyūdō in Zen in the Art of Archery.
- Tsurune – A Japanese light novel series about a school kyūdō club, later adapted into an anime in 2018 by Kyoto Animation.
