= Yabusame =

Type of Japanese mounted archery

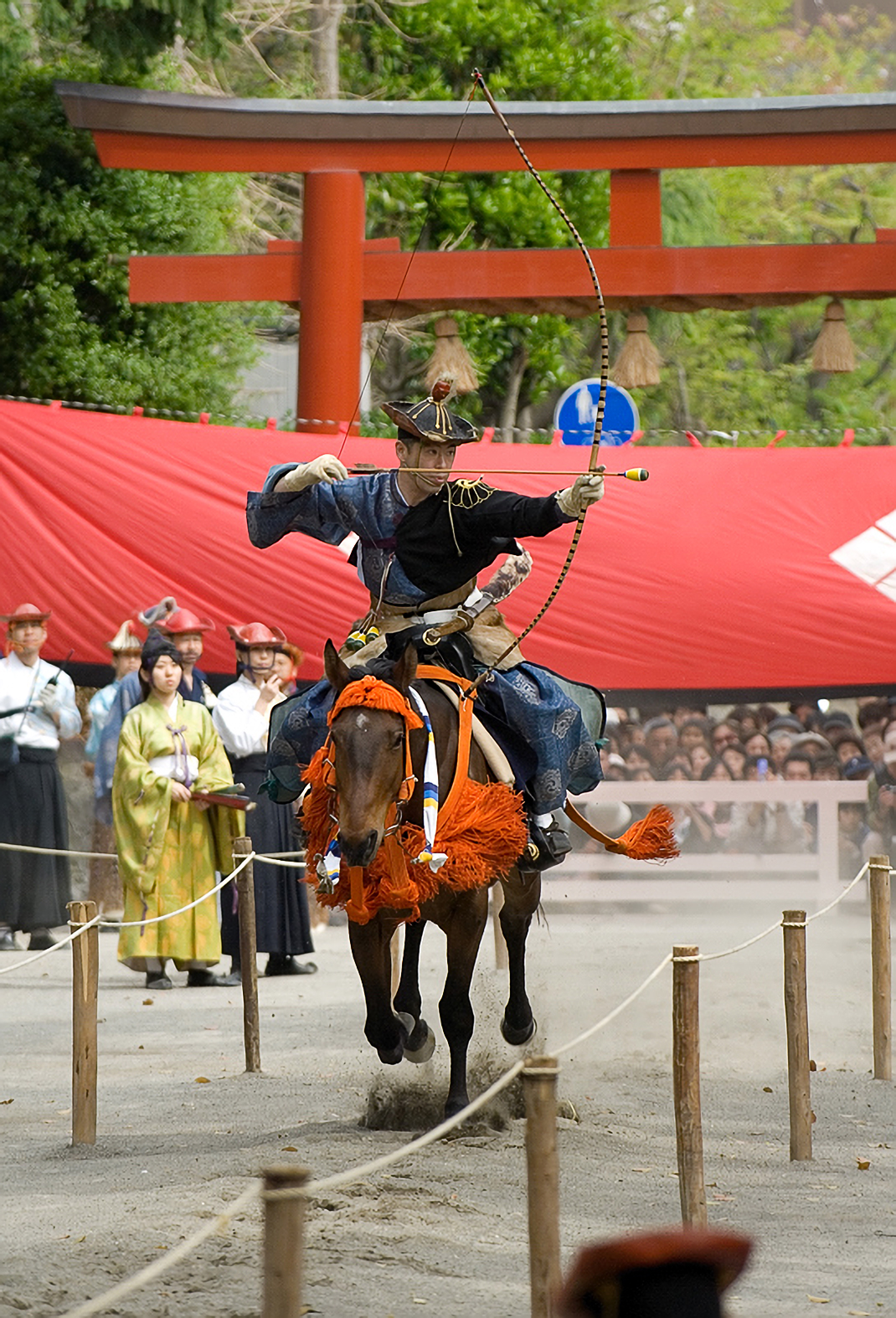
Yabusame archer on horseback

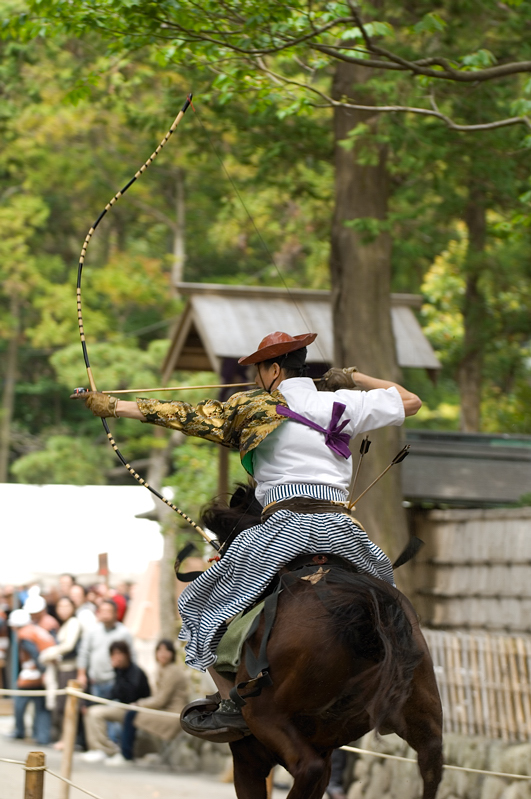
Yabusame archer takes aim on the second target.

Yabusame (流鏑馬) is a type of mounted archery in traditional Japanese archery. An archer on a running horse shoots three special "turnip-headed" arrows (Kabura-ya) successively at three wooden targets.

This style of archery has its origins at the beginning of the Kamakura period. Minamoto no Yoritomo became alarmed at the lack of archery skills his samurai possessed. He organized yabusame as a form of practice.

Nowadays, the best places to see yabusame performed are at the Tsurugaoka Hachiman-gū in Kamakura and Shimogamo Shrine in Kyoto (during Aoi Matsuri in early May). It is also performed in Samukawa and on the beach at Zushi, as well as other locations.

== History ==
Yabusame in Sumida Park, Tokyo, 2013

Japanese bows date back to the prehistoric Jōmon period. The long, unique, asymmetrical bow style with the grip below the center emerged during the Yayoi period (300 BC – 300 AD). Bows became a symbol of authority and power. The legendary first emperor of Japan, Emperor Jimmu, is always depicted carrying a bow.

Some Emishi tribes, notably the Hitakami, practice horse archery and were noted and feared by the Yamato Kingship.

The use of the bow had been on foot until around the 4th century, when elite soldiers took to fighting on horseback with bows and swords. In the 10th century, samurai would have archery duels on horseback. They would ride at each other and try to shoot at least three arrows. These duels did not necessarily have to end in death, as long as honor was satisfied.

One of the most celebrated incidents of Japanese mounted archery occurred during the Genpei War (1180–1185), an epic struggle for power between the Minamoto clan and the Taira clan that was to have a major impact on culture, society, and politics.

At the Battle of Yashima, the Heike (Taira), having been defeated in battle, fled to Yashima and took to their boats. They were fiercely pursued by the Genji (Minamoto) on horseback, but the Genji were halted by the sea.

As the Heike waited for the winds to be right, they presented a fan hung from a mast as a target for any Genji archer to shoot at in a gesture of chivalrous rivalry between enemies.

One of the Genji samurai, Nasu no Yoichi, accepted the challenge. He rode his horse into the sea and shot the fan cleanly through. This feat is still celebrated to this day.

During the Kamakura period (1192–1334), mounted archery was used as a military training exercise to keep samurai prepared for war. Those archers who did poorly might find themselves commanded to commit seppuku, or ritual suicide.

One style of mounted archery was inuoumono – shooting at dogs. Buddhist priests were able to prevail upon the samurai to have the arrows padded so that the dogs were only annoyed and bruised rather than killed. This sport is no longer practised.

== Ritual ==
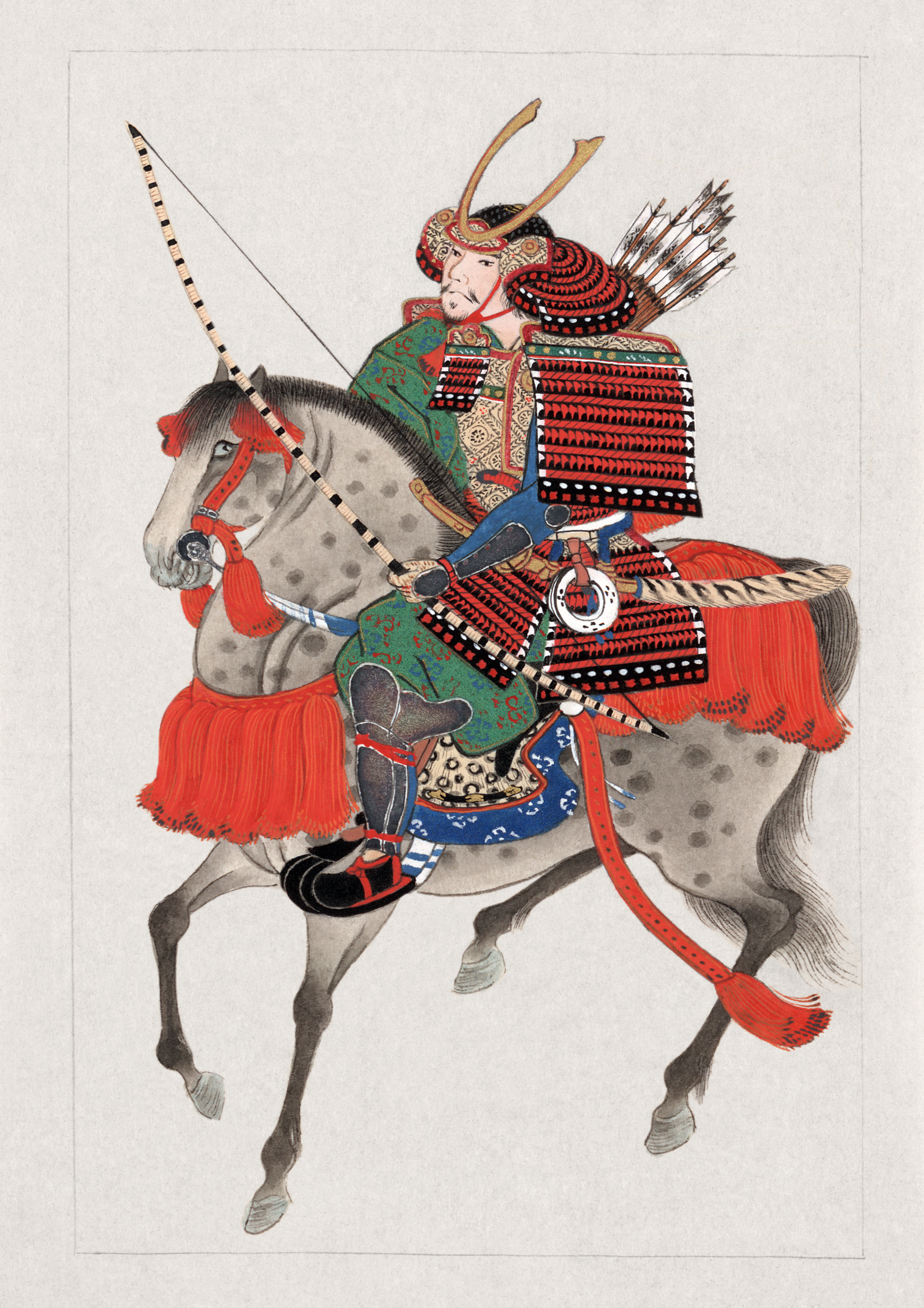
A mounted samurai with bow and arrows, wearing a horned helmet. Circa 1878.

Yabusame was designed as a way to please and entertain the myriad of gods that watch over Japan, thus encouraging their blessings for the prosperity of the land, the people, and the harvest.

A yabusame archer gallops down a 255-metre-long (280 yd) track at high speed. The archer mainly controls his horse with his knees, as he needs both hands to draw and shoot his bow. As he approaches a target, he brings his bow up and draws the arrow past his ear before letting the arrow fly with a deep shout of In-Yo-In-Yo (darkness and light). The arrow is blunt and round-shaped in order to make a louder sound when it strikes the board.

Experienced archers are allowed to use arrows with a V-shaped prong. If the board is struck, it will splinter with a confetti-like material and fall to the ground. To hit all three targets is considered an admirable accomplishment. Yabusame targets and their placement are designed to ritually replicate the optimum target for a lethal blow on an opponent wearing full traditional samurai armor (O-Yoroi) which left the space just beneath the helmet visor bare.

Yabusame is characterized as a ritual rather than a sport because of its solemn style and religious aspects, and is often performed for special ceremonies or official events, such as entertaining foreign dignitaries and heads of state. Yabusame demonstrations have been given for the formal visits of US Presidents Ronald Reagan, George W. Bush, and Barack Obama. A yabusame demonstration was given in the United Kingdom for Prince Charles, who reportedly was fascinated and pleased with the performance.

To be selected as a yabusame archer is a great honor. In the past, they were chosen from only the best warriors. The archer who performs the best is awarded a white cloth, signifying divine favor.

== Schools ==
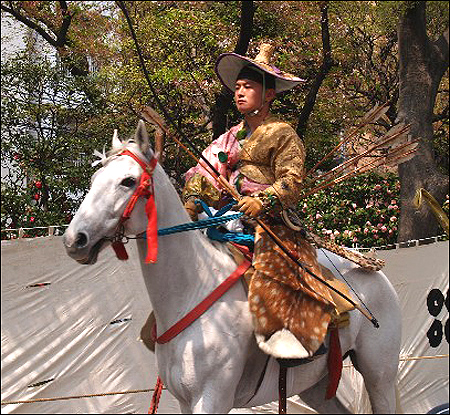
Yabusame archer wearing traditional 13th century clothing

There are two schools of mounted archery that perform yabusame. One is the Ogasawara school. The founder, Ogasawara Nagakiyo, was instructed by the shōgun Minamoto no Yoritomo (1147–1199) to start a school for archery. Yoritomo wanted his warriors to be highly skilled and disciplined. Archery was seen as a good way for instilling the necessary principles for a samurai warrior.

Zen became a major element in both foot and mounted archery as it also became popular among the samurai in every aspect of their life during the Kamakura period.

Yabusame as a martial art helped a samurai learn concentration, discipline, and refinement. Zen taught breathing techniques to stabilize the mind and body, giving clarity and focus. To be able to calmly draw one's bow, aim, and shoot in the heat of battle, and then repeat, was the mark of a true samurai who had mastered his training and his fear.

The other archery school was begun earlier by Minamoto no Yoshiari in the 9th century at the command of Emperor Uda. This school became known as the Takeda school of archery. The Takeda style has been featured in classic samurai films such as Akira Kurosawa's Seven Samurai (1954) and Kagemusha (1980). Toshiro Mifune, was a noted student of the Takeda school.

== Decline and revival ==
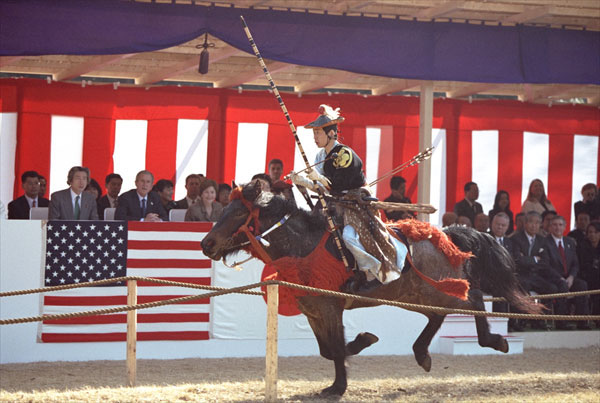
Yabusame demonstrated for United States president George W. Bush at the Meiji Shrine

With the arrival of the Portuguese and their guns in the mid-16th century, the bow began to lose its importance on the battlefield. At the Battle of Nagashino in 1575, well-placed groups of teppō-wielders serving Oda Nobunaga and the Tokugawa fired in volleys and practically annihilated the cavalry charges of the Takeda clan.

Mounted archery was revived in the Edo period (1600–1867) by Ogasawara Heibei Tsuneharu (1666–1747) under the command of the shogun Tokugawa Yoshimune (1684–1751). Given that the nation was at peace, archery and other martial arts became more a means of personal development than military training.

== Contemporary practice ==
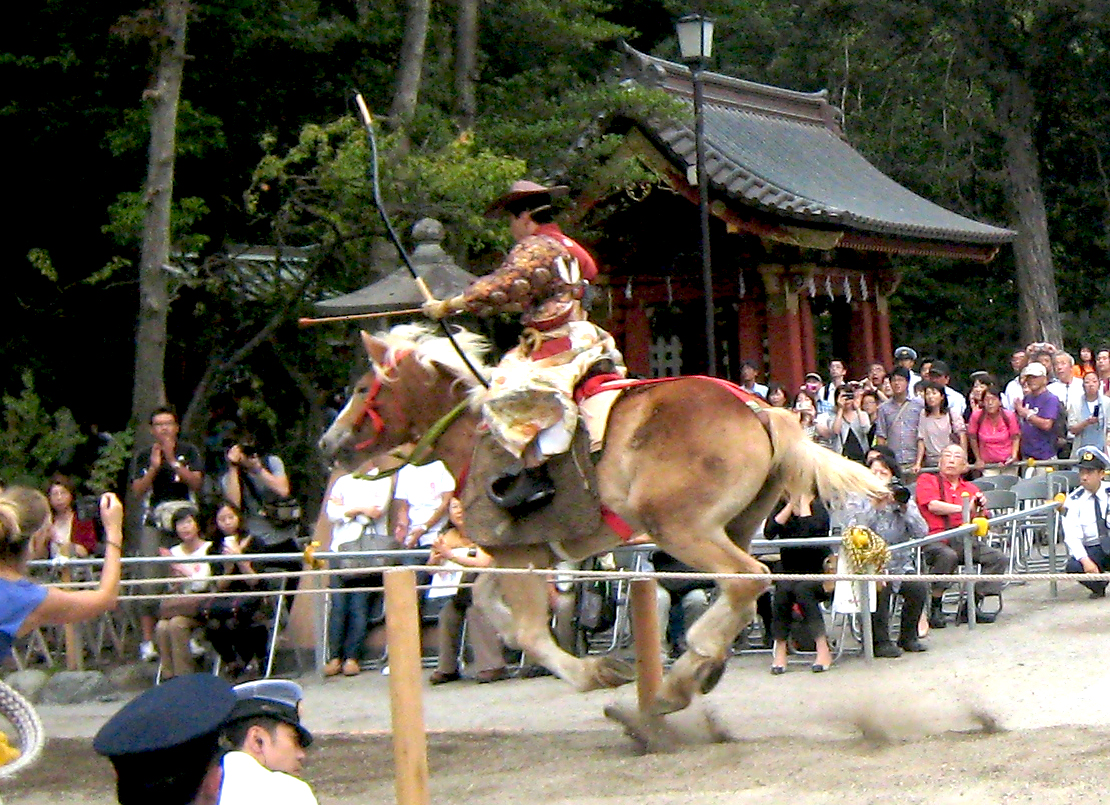
Yabusame at Tsurugaoka Hachiman-gū

Yabusame is held at various times of the year, generally near Shinto shrines. On the 2nd Sunday of April every year, there is a Yabusame ceremony held at the Washibara Hachiman-gū shrine in Tsuwano, Shimane. At this ceremony, the Ogasawara school performs Yabusame at the oldest Yabusame Horse Archery range in Japan. In May, the Aoi Matsuri (Hollyhock festival) in Kyoto includes yabusame. Other locations include Tsurugaoka Hachiman-gū in Kamakura, together with Samukawa and on the beach at Zushi.

== Popular culture ==
- The 2012 version of Teenage Mutant Ninja Turtles features yabusame being used by Gennosuke, the rhino bounty hunter and ally for the rabbit samurai Miyamoto Usagi.
- Yabusame was featured as part of the fighting styles of samurai members in The Last Samurai.
- Power Rangers Samurai features yabusame being used by Blue Ranger Kevin Douglas uses his Hydro Bow while on horseback.
- Yabusame is a minigame in Rise of the Ronin.

== See also ==
- Kyūjutsu
- Kyūdō
  - Yumi
  - Ya (arrow)
- Kasagake
- Shihan Mato
- Inuoumono
- Tōshiya
- Bajutsu
  - Jinba ittai
- Horses in warfare
  - Horses in East Asian warfare
- Jousting
- Dressage
