= Kabura-ya =

Variation of arrow used by Samurai class

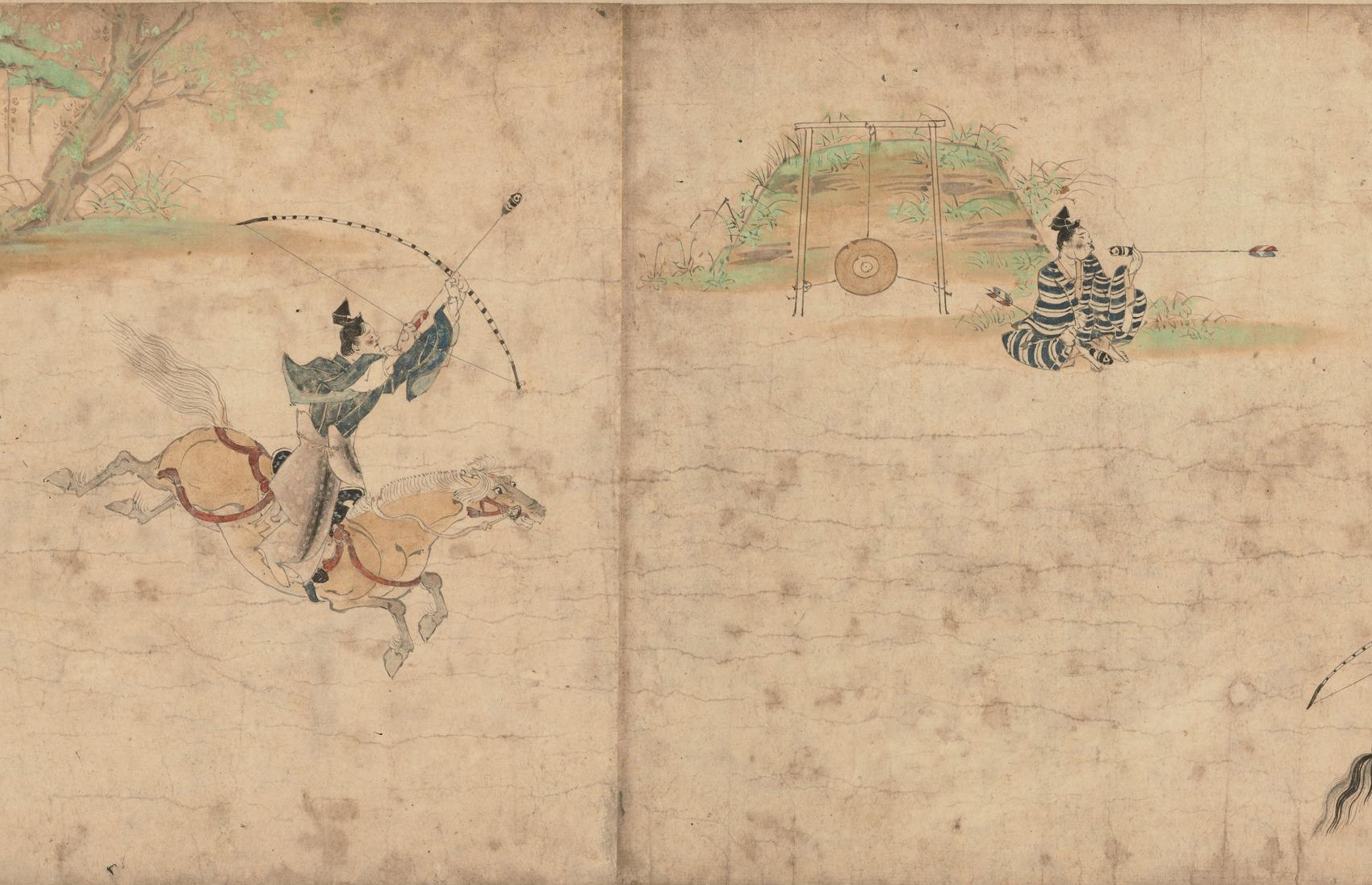
Samurai archer shooting a kabura-ya over the Azuchi

Kabura-ya (鏑矢; lit. 'turnip[-headed] arrow') is a type of Japanese arrow used by the samurai class of feudal Japan. Kabura-ya were arrows which whistled when shot and were used in ritual archery exchanges before formal medieval battles.

Like a wind instrument, the sound was created by a specially carved or perforated bulb of deer horn or wood attached to the tip. In English, these are often called "whistling-bulb arrows", "messenger arrows", or "signal arrows." Kabura literally translates to "turnip", and thus the Japanese term technically means 'turnip[-shaped] arrows'. The Chinese xiangjian (sometimes pronounced and written mingdi) was quite similar, and until the end of the Warlord Era were commonly used by bandits to announce the gang's approach.

In Shinto, the sound made by the kabura-ya arrow in mid-flight is thought to ward off evil influences. Hence, it is used in Shinto rites to purify locations such as shrine grounds and parks. Other sacred bows similarly used in Shinto rituals are the hama yumi and the azusa yumi.

== Use ==
In battle, particularly around the time of the Heian period, kabura-ya would be shot before a battle, to alert the enemy. The whistling sound was also believed to chase away evil spirits, and to alert friendly kami to lend their support. It was not uncommon for archery exchanges to be performed for quite some time, and in the 1183 battle of Kurikara, for example, fifteen arrows were shot by each side, then thirty, then fifty, then one hundred, before these hundred samurai on each side actually engaged one another in battle. It was also not uncommon for messages to be tied to these arrows, which could be shot into fortresses, battle camps or the like. This practice of the formal archery exchange likely died out gradually following the end of the Heian period, as war became less and less ritualized.

The arrows would also be sold at Shintō shrines as good luck charms, particularly around New Year's Day; simply carrying a kabura-ya, like a Hama Ya, is meant to serve as a ward against evil spirits.

== See also ==
- Kasagake – Type of Japanese mounted archery
- Carnyx – Ancient musical instrument
- Dacian draco – Standard ensign of troops of the ancient Dacian people

== Sources ==
- Frederic, Louis (2002). "Japan Encyclopedia." Cambridge, Massachusetts: Harvard University Press.
- Billingsley, Phil (1988). "Bandits in Republican China" Stanford University Press
