= Azusa Yumi =

Sacred bow that dispels ghosts and evil spirits in Shinto rituals

- Classification: String

An azusa yumi (梓弓) is a sacred bow (yumi) used in certain Shinto rituals in Japan, as well as a Japanese musical bow, made from the wood of the Japanese azusa (梓) or Japanese cherry birch tree (Betula grossa). Playing an azusa yumi forms part of some Shinto rituals; in Japan, it is believed that merely the twanging of the bowstring will frighten ghosts and evil spirits away from a house. In Japanese poetry, the word azusa yumi functions as a makurakotoba ("pillow word", a kind of epithet).

The story is told in Japanese mythology that a golden bird perched on the bow of Emperor Jimmu, the great-grandson of the sun goddess Amaterasu, and the first human ruler of Japan. This was seen as an extremely good omen; Jimmu's bow developed the power to dispel evil by the mere plucking of its string. His bow was made of azusa wood.

== See also ==
- Apotropaic magic
- Amulet
- Talisman
- Omamori (御守 or お守り)
- Ofuda (御札/お札) -- a paper charm, similar to a Taoist/Daoist Fulu.
- Hama Ya (破魔矢) -- an "Evil-Destroying Arrow".
- Hama Yumi (破魔弓) -- an "Evil-Destroying Bow".
- Saigū Yumi (祭宮弓) -- a "Ceremonial Bow".
- Kabura-ya (鏑矢) -- a "Turnip[-headed] Arrow".
