= Hama yumi =

Sacred bow used in 1103 CE in Japan

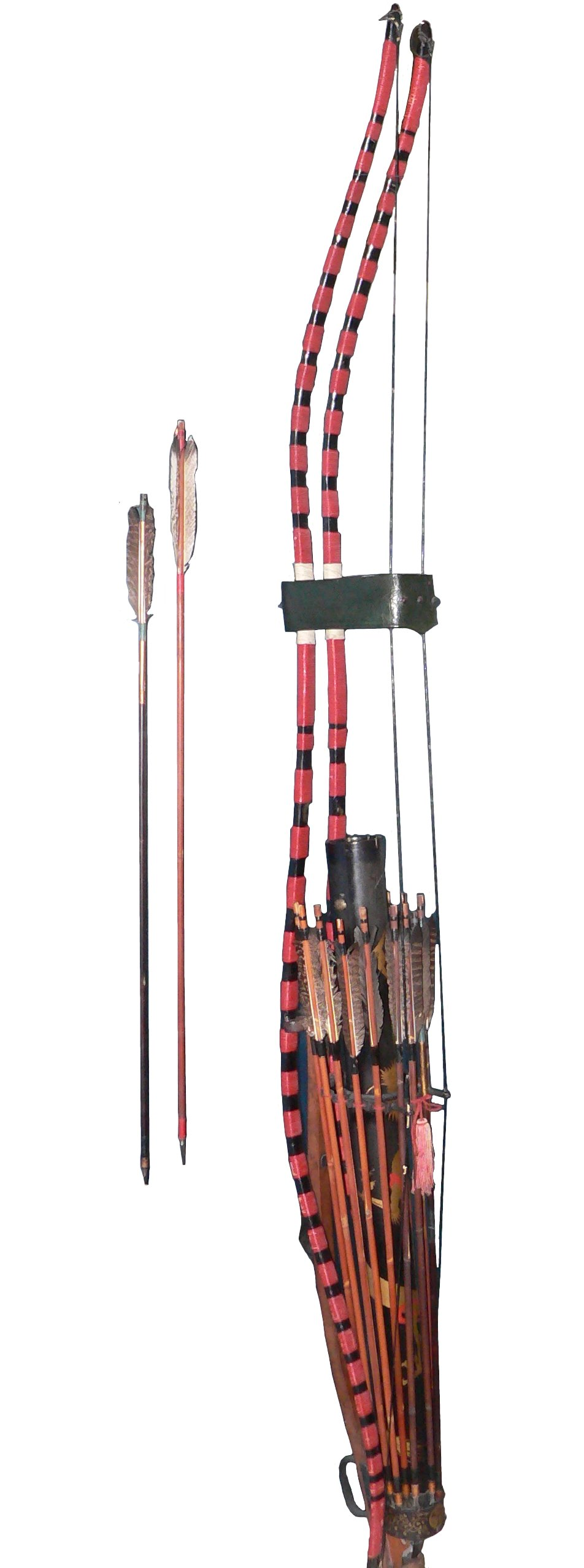
Japanese bows, arrows, and arrow-stand

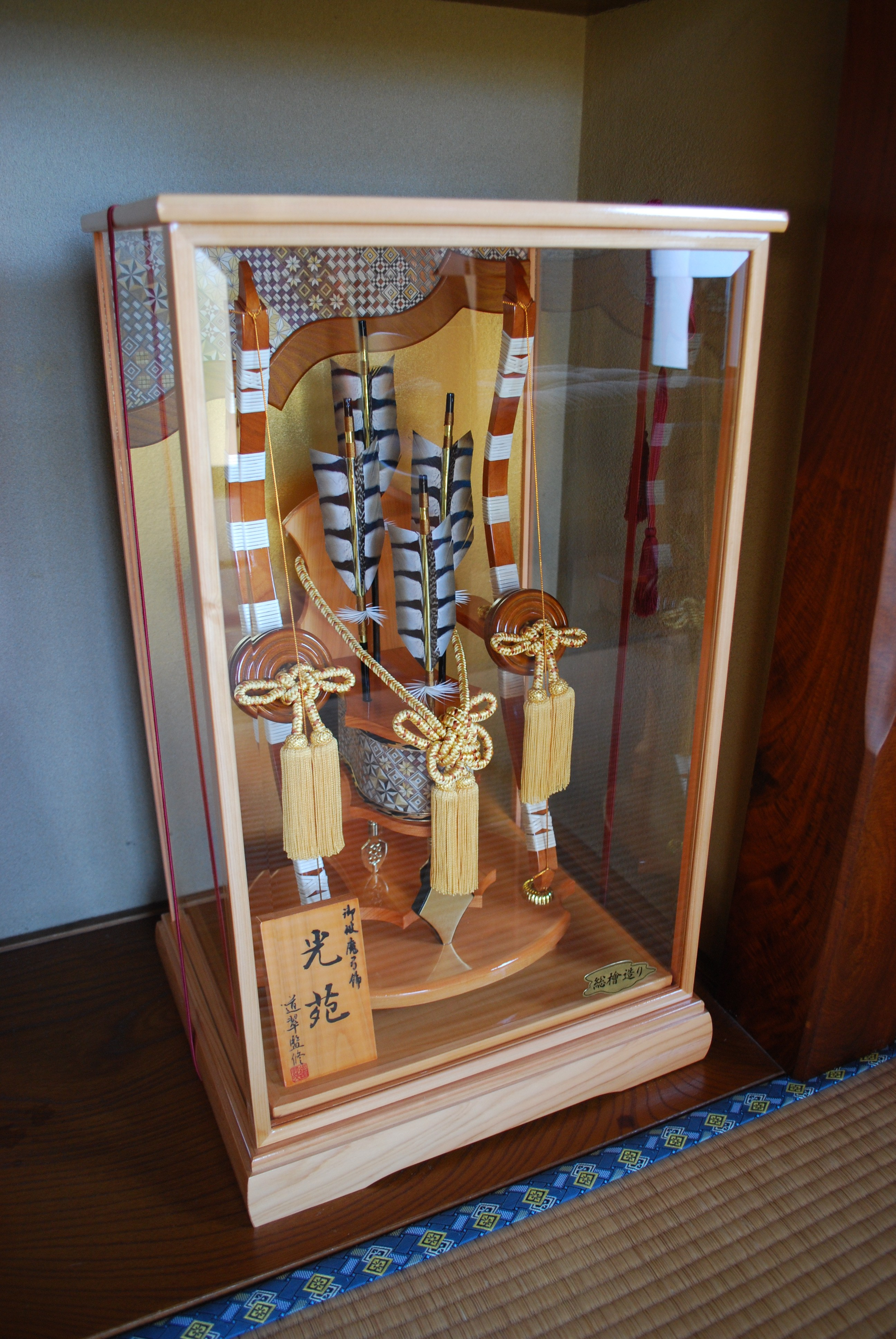
Hama yumi, with hama ya

The hama yumi (破魔弓; lit. 'evil-destroying bow') is a sacred bow (yumi) used in 1103 CE in Japan. This bow is said to be one of the oldest and most sacred Japanese weapons; the first Emperor Jimmu is always depicted carrying a bow.

According to legend; at that time, the Imperial Palace was taken over by an evil demon, which caused the Emperor to fall ill with great anxiety and suffering. When the Imperial High Priests tried and failed in their efforts to destroy the demon and dispel the Imperial household of its influence, they were at a loss. Finally, an archer, Minamoto no Yorimasa, was summoned to the Imperial Palace in the hopes of slaying the demon with his bow and arrow, ridding the palace of this plague. With a steady hand and a virtuous heart, Yorimasa vanquished the demon with the first arrow, and his bow was declared to be a hama yumi, an "Evil-Destroying Bow" (and the first arrow a hama ya an "Evil-Destroying Arrow").

Since then, hama yumi have been used in Buddhist and Shinto rituals of purification (i.e., Shihōbarai, 四方払い, the Purification/Sweep of the Four Directions). In Japan, it is believed that merely the twanging of its bowstring will frighten away ghosts, evil spirits and negative influences from the house. A miko will carry a hama yumi and a set of hama ya as part of their religious regalia, while back in Feudal Japan, they were used quite literally in defence of the shrine or temple.

As a result, hama ya (破魔矢; lit. 'evil-destroying arrows'), decorative arrows, are sold even today at shrines as Engimono (good-luck charms); smaller replicas have been placed in shrines and people's homes. It is believed that even just one Hama-Ya which has been blessed by a Shinto Priest carries great spiritual power, will bring protection against the forces of evil, and for purification, and they are also believed to have the ability to attract vast good fortune. Hama ya and hama yumi are often given as gifts to celebrate the first New Year of a male baby's life.

Hama-yumi replicas are scale versions of the sacred Japanese bow, coated with urushi, wrapped in fine rattan and accented in gold leaf. They are displayed in a stand, along with two arrows tipped with yanone (traditional warrior tips); one representing male and the other female, yin and yang (vermilion signifying male energy (yang), and black representing female energy (yin)).

== See also ==
- Apotropaic magic
- Omamori
- Ofuda (御札/お札) – a paper charm
- Azusa yumi (梓弓) – a bow made from the wood of the Japanese cherry birch tree (Betula grossa)
- Saigū-yumi (祭宮弓) – a ceremonial bow
