= Kasagake =

Type of Japanese mounted archery

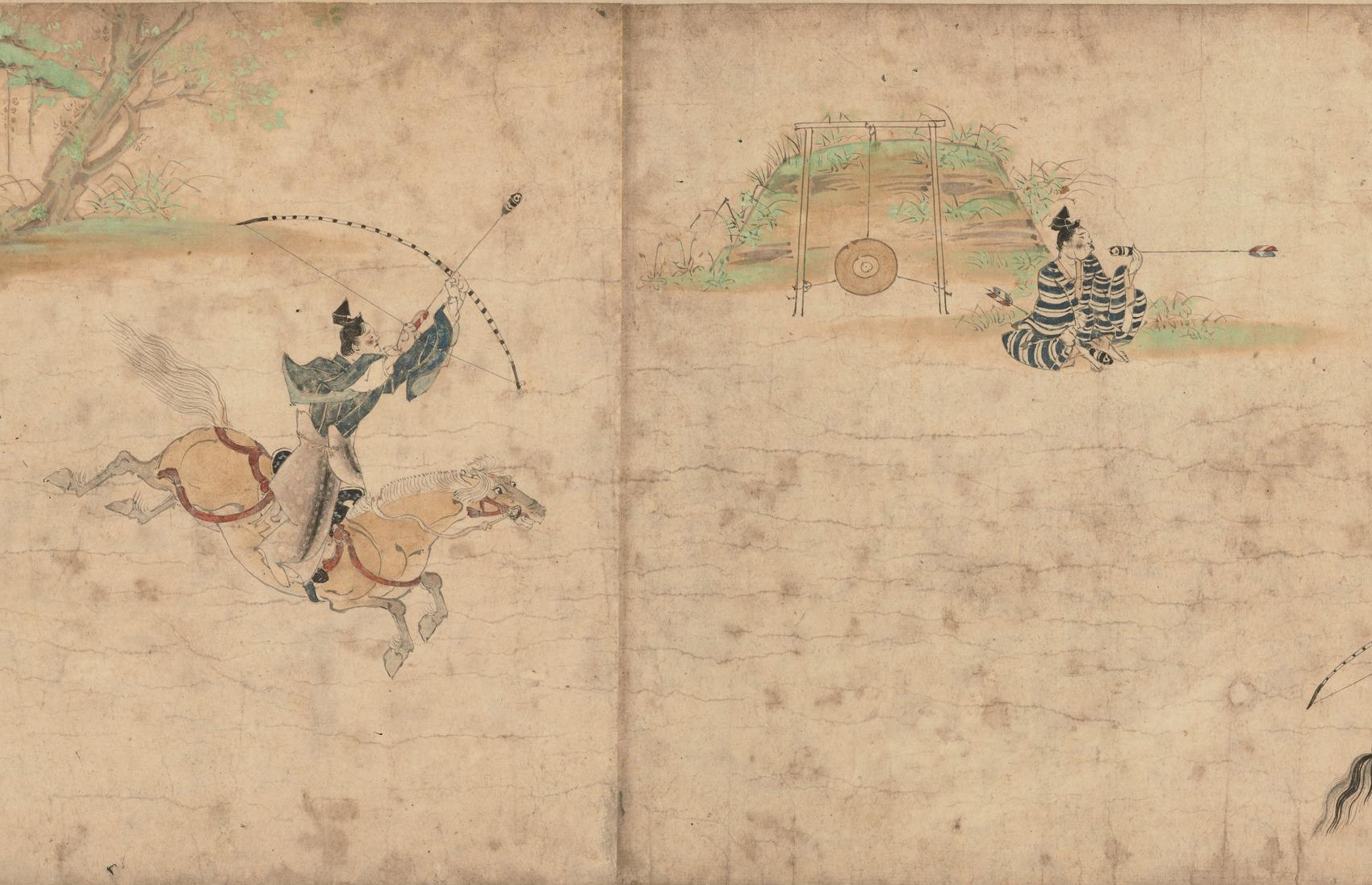
Kasagake depicted around 1250 in emakimono "Obusuma Saburo ekotoba".

Kasagake or Kasakake (笠懸, lit. "hat shooting") is a type of Japanese mounted archery. In contrast to yabusame, the types of targets are various and the archer shoots without stopping the horse. While yabusame has been played as a part of formal ceremonies, kasagake has developed as a game or practice of martial arts, focusing on technical elements of horse archery.

== History ==
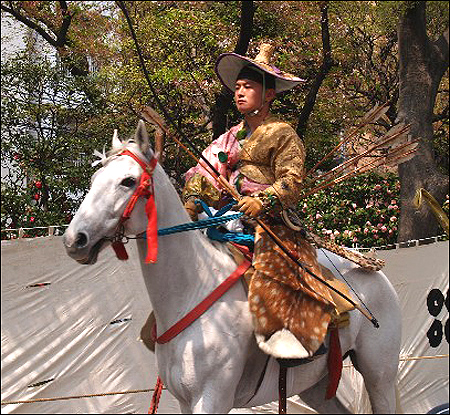
The hat the man wearing is ayaigasa, which was initially used as targets for kasagake.

The word "kasagake" first appears in "Sadaie Assonn Ki" (定家朝臣記) by Minamoto no Sadaie in 1057 and "Shin Sarugō Ki" (新猿楽記) by Fujiwara no Akihira (989-1066) while legendary sayings states kasagake has been started by Minamoto no Yoritomo (1147-1199).

At first, hats (ayaigasa) hung on azuchi were used as targets, later replaced by target specially made for kasagake, consists of wooden skeleton, cotton, wool or rice straws stuffing and leather surface, hung on wooden frames as in the picture above.

In Kamakura period, "the three martial arts of mounted archery" (騎射三物), which are yabusame, kasagake, and inuoumono, were widely practiced by samurai. These martial arts lost their importance when the Kamakura Shogunate fell. Kasagake was inherited just inside the Ogasawara and Takeda family as a part of bowing manners for long years.

In Edo period, under the command of Tokugawa Yoshimune, Ogasawara Tsuneharu revived the three martial arts of mounted archery. Ogasawara school arts are played at Edo Bakufu's official yard Takadanobaba with the aid of Bakufu and Takeda school arts are trained in Jishukan school at Kumamoto by the Hosokawa family.

Today, Ogasawara school and Takeda school kasagake can be watched on some festivals, such as the shinji kasagake at Kamigamo Shrine in Kyoto, Dousun Festival in Miura, Kanagawa and local festival in Kasakake, Gunnma, where Minamoto no Yoritomo performed kasageke.

== The Rules and Styles of Kasagake ==
Details may varies from school. Below are some sample rules.

=== Yard Settings ===
Kasagake uses a 109 m (358 ft) long horse yard. Fences known as "rachi" (埒) are placed on each side of the horse running path: "saguri" (疏). The target is set at the 71 m (233 ft) point from the starting point "babamoto" (馬場元), the left side of the path. The archer shoots the target while running the path.

=== Dressing ===
Like yabusame, the archers wear hitatare (直垂, a kind of formal dress for samurai) and mukabaki (行縢). Cuffs are not tied and traditionally igote (射籠手, arm bands) are not put on. The archer does not wear the hat, for the hat was historically taken for the target.

=== The Variety of Kasagake Targets and Styles ===
tōkasagake (遠笠懸, とおかさがけ lit. far hat shooting)
Tōkasagake is the most common style of kasagake. A 55 cm (22 in) diameter circle target is set 11.4–22.7 m (37–74 ft) far from the running path fence. Unlike yabusame, only one target is shot.
Kokasagake or Ogasakake (小笠懸, こかさがけ or おがさがけ lit. small hat shooting)
Usually performed on returning run of tōkasagake. Small (24–48 cm (9.4–18.9 in)) square wooden board clipped on a bamboo bar is shot with smaller arrows. The target is set 2.3 m (7 ft 7 in) from the fence, at the low place. Kokasagake declined aduring Genkyu era (1204), though there were some famous archers such as Hojo Tokimune, who is famous for kogasagake ("Agatsuma Kagami" April 25th, 1261 (Genkyu 1).)

Kuji Kasagake (籤笠懸, literally “lottery hat shooting”)
Kasagake conducted as a competition of martial arts. The referee (検見役) and the recoder (日記役) are involved. 10 participants are separated into 5 pairs by the lottery, and compete for the number of hits with a partner.
Shinji Kasagake (神事笠懸, literally “divine hat shooting”)
Kasagake conducted as shrine ceremonies. Deer, birds, or fish devoted to the shrine are shot.
Hyakuban Kasagake (百番笠懸 literally “100-time hat shooting”)
Performed as a dedication for prayer. Each archer shoots 100 times.
Tanabata Kasagake (七夕笠懸) or Shichido Kasagake (七度笠懸, literally “7-time hat shooting”)
Kasagake as a tanabata event. Archers shoot the target seven times or shoot seven targets.
Hasamimono (挟物, literally “clipping objects”)
The archer shoots targets (typically ōgi, hand-held fans) clipped onto bamboo bars. This is usually done for recreation. Hasamimono also appear in other styles of kyūdō.

== See also ==
- Yabusame
- Kyūjutsu
- Kyūdō
- Bajutsu
