= Bajutsu =

Japanese form of military equestrianism

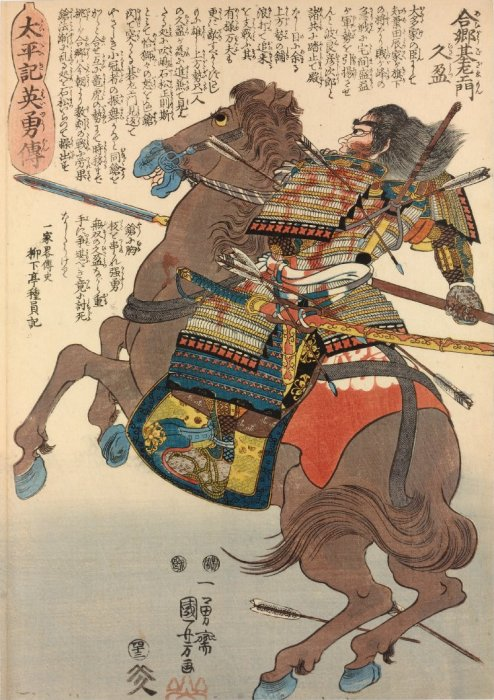
A Japanese warrior fighting from horseback

Bajutsu (馬術) is a Japanese form of military equestrianism.

== History ==
Although its origins are closely related to those of mounted archery (yabusame), bajutsu is considered a distinct and separate martial art, and there are a number of traditional schools, such as the Ogasawara, Otsubo, and Hachijo. The art originated in the 7th century AD during the reign of Emperor Tenji but was popularised in the 12th century as large-scale mounted warfare became more common. However, the comparative scarcity of horses in Japan meant that bajutsu was always an elite art, restricted to high-ranking samurai. In spite of this, many contemporary historians ignored the numbers of foot-soldiers in battles and referred to the size of armies by the number of horsemen alone.

The comparative peace of the Tokugawa era from 1600 onwards led to a decline in the military practice of bajutsu, and it became relegated to a more ceremonial role, indeed, the practice of horsemanship was actively discouraged during the reign of Tokugawa Tsunayoshi. By the beginning of the 20th century there were more than 20 schools of bajutsu and the Japan Bajutsu Federation was formed in Tokyo in 1946 to promote it as a modern sport.

== Techniques ==
As well as requiring proficiency in riding and mounted sword-fighting, the art also included teachings on the care and upkeep of horses. Horses were trained to ignore sudden shocks, and to press forward in the charge, veering off at the last second to allow the rider to kick with his battering-ram-like stirrups. These stirrups (shitanaga abumi) were designed to enable the rider to stand and shoot easily from the saddle. Cavalry charges were made possible by the development of spear techniques from horseback in the late 14th century, supplanting the mounted archery styles that had previously dominated. Such charges were used to great effect by the Takeda clan, who introduced the tactic during the mid-to-late sixteenth century, but after the Battle of Nagashino, were used only in conjunction with infantry manoeuvres.

== See also ==
- Yabusame
- Horse racing in Japan
