= Heki Danjō Masatsugu =

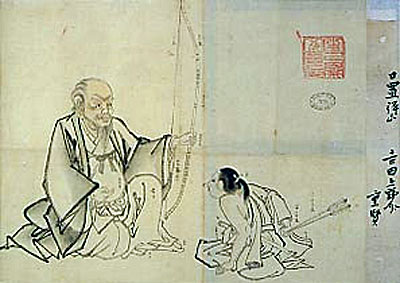
Heki Danjō Masatsugu teatches kyujutsu to Yoshida Shigekata.

Heki Danjō Masatsugu (日置弾正政次, 1443 in Yamato, Japan – 1502) was a warrior and the creator of the school of basic archery skills for footsoldiers. Heki Danjō's teaching started one of the prominent schools of kyūdō, which is named Heki-ryū after him. Several Heki-ryū branches are taught actively even today.

Heki Danjō lived in warlike times when it was considered honorable to be linked to famous warriors. For this reason there is no certainty to the connection between every Heki-ryū branch and the historical figure Heki Danjō. It is known however that Heki Danjō taught Yoshida Shigekata, who compiled the lessons in a scroll (mokuroku), which is still an important part of Heki-ryū's teaching.

The founder of Heki-ryū Insai-branch, Yoshida Genpachirō Shigeuji, wrote about Heki Danjō as a manifestation of the god of war Hachiman. History tells us little of his life. Heki Danjō was born in Yamato, became a famed archer in a battle, taught kyūjutsu and shortly before his death, he became a monk at Mount Kōya.

== See also ==
- 日置流 (Heki-ryū) in the Japanese Wikipedia
