= Inuoumono =

Japanese sport that involved mounted archers shooting at dogs

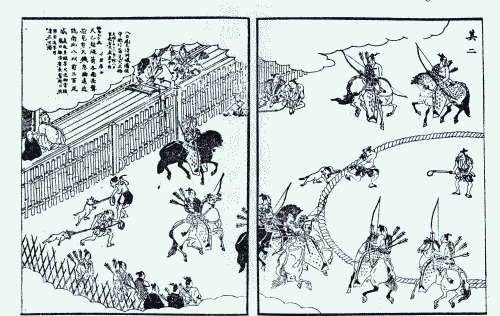
Inuoumono

Inuoumono (犬追物) was a Japanese sport that involved mounted archers shooting at dogs. The dogs were released into a circular enclosure approximately 15m across, and mounted archers would fire upon them whilst riding around the perimeter.

Originally intended as a military training exercise, dog-shooting became popular as a sport among the Japanese nobility during the Kamakura and Muromachi periods (1185-1573). During this time it was briefly banned during the rule of Emperor Go-Daigo (owing to his concern for the dogs); however, this ruling was overturned by the shōgun Ashikaga Takauji at the behest of his archery teacher Ogasawara Sadamune. The influential Ogasawara family were particular adherents of inuoumono; Sadamune's archery treatise Inuoumono mikuanbumi regarded it as fundamental to a warrior's training, and his great-grandson Mochinaga devoted five books to the subject.

The arrows used in dog-shooting were usually rendered non-fatal, by being either padded or blunted. This modification to the original sport was suggested by the Buddhist clergy, as a way of preventing injury to the dogs used.

Inuoumono waned in popularity during the sixteenth century and has been largely extinct as a practice since then. It was eventually banned outright during the reign of Tokugawa Iemochi. Occasional revivals have taken place: there is a record of the shōgun Tokugawa Ieyoshi viewing dog-shooting in 1842, and the sport was performed for Ulysses S. Grant during an official visit to Japan in 1879 (Grant reportedly expressed distaste for the practice). The last recorded instance of dog-shooting took place before the Meiji Emperor in 1881.

== See also ==
- Yabusame
- Kasagake
