= Tōshiya =

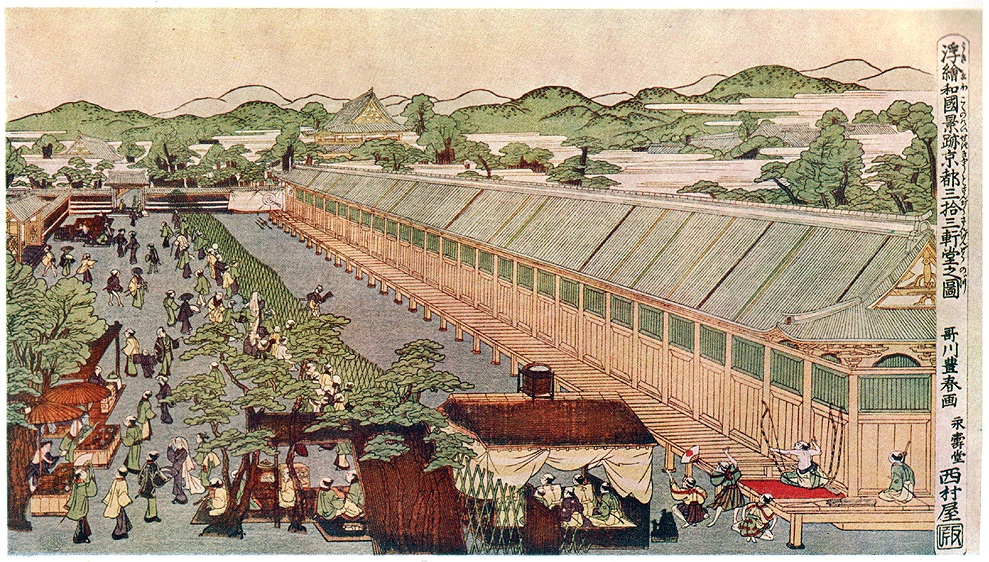
An ukiyo-e woodcut from the Edo period depicting the Tōshiya

The Tōshiya (通し矢, とおしや, lit. 'passing arrow') or the arrows which hit the target, was an archery exhibition contest held on the west veranda of Sanjūsangen-dō temple in Kyoto, Japan.

== History of the contest ==
The contest originated in the late 16th century dating back to 1606 when a samurai named Asaoka Heibei is said to have shot 51 arrows in rapid succession down the length of the veranda. In the beginning, archers shot arrows from the southern end of the veranda to the northern end where a curtain-like ornament was erected as a target. The contest gained popularity during the Edo period and by the late 17th century competitions between participants from the Owari and Kishū provinces were drawing big crowds. The Tōshiya would later be used as a motif in stories and film.

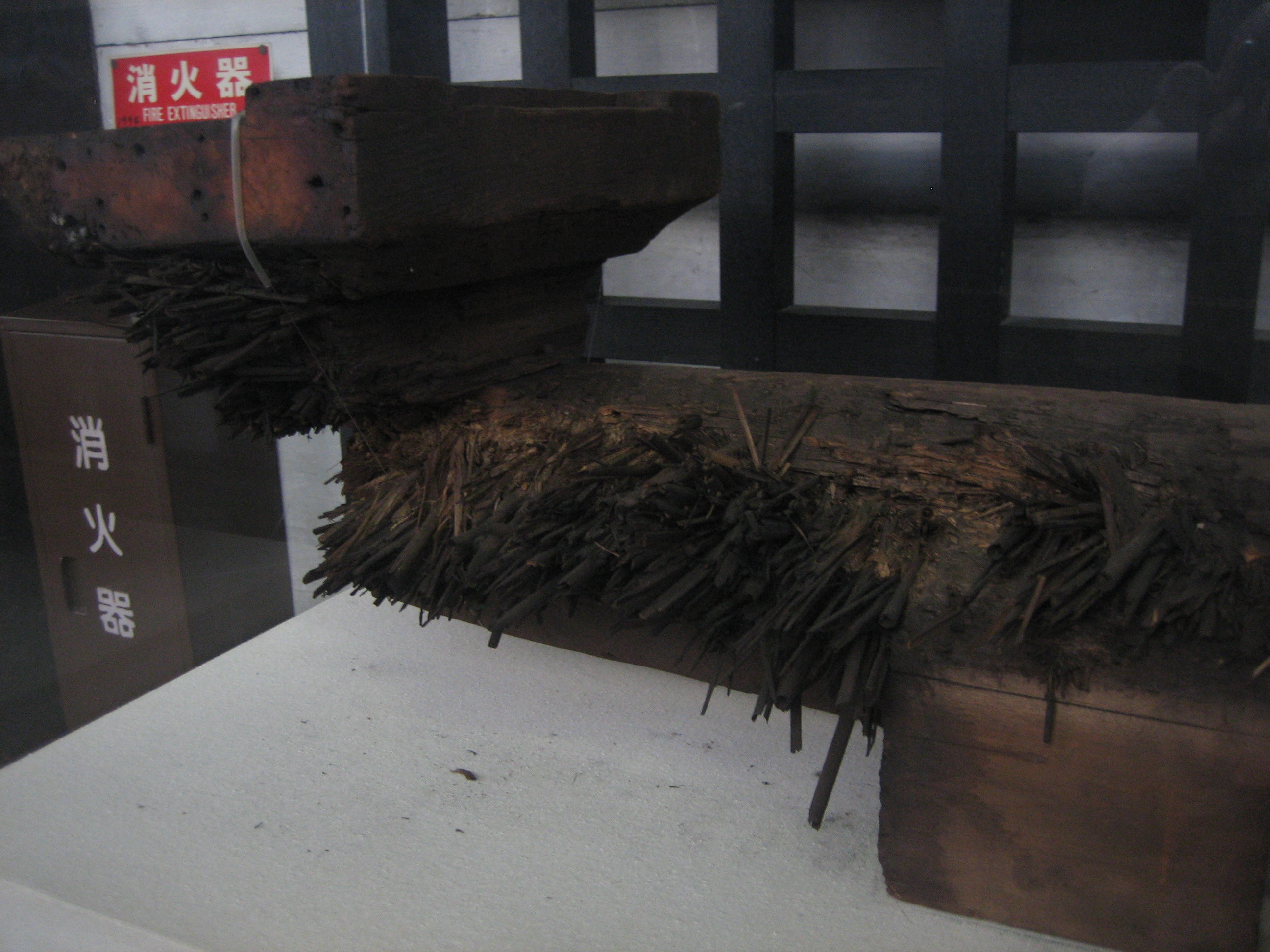
Parts of wooden roof beams removed during reconstruction work. The bristles are remains of numerous arrows which hit the beam during annual archery competition

There were four distinct events at the competition:

- The Hyaku-i (百射, lit. 'one hundred shots') The archer who hit the target with the most out of 100 arrows was declared the winner.
- The Sen-i (千射, lit. 'one thousand shots') The archer who hit the target with the most out of 1000 arrows was declared the winner. In 1827, an 11-year-old named Kokura Gishichi successfully hit the target 995 times shooting from half the distance of the hall.
- The Hiyakazu (日矢数, lit. 'Number of arrows in a day') Boys who had not yet celebrated their Genpuku, or coming-of-age ceremony, could compete in this event. Archers would shoot as many arrows as possible for a 12-hour period during the day. In 1774, the third year of the An'ei era, Masaaki Noro, a 13-year-old from Kishū, shot 11,715 arrows with almost all of them hitting the target.
- The Ōyakazu (大矢数, lit. 'great many arrows') This event is said to date from the Keichō era. Archers would shoot as many arrows as possible for a 24-hour period, loosing an average of 10,000 arrows. On April 26, 1686, Wasa Daihachiro from Kishū successfully hit 8,133 out of 13,053 arrows averaging 544 arrows an hour, or 9 arrows a minute, and became the record holder.

Champions were honored by having a certificate hung in the temple showing their name, age, the number of arrows shot and the date of the competition.

== The contest today ==
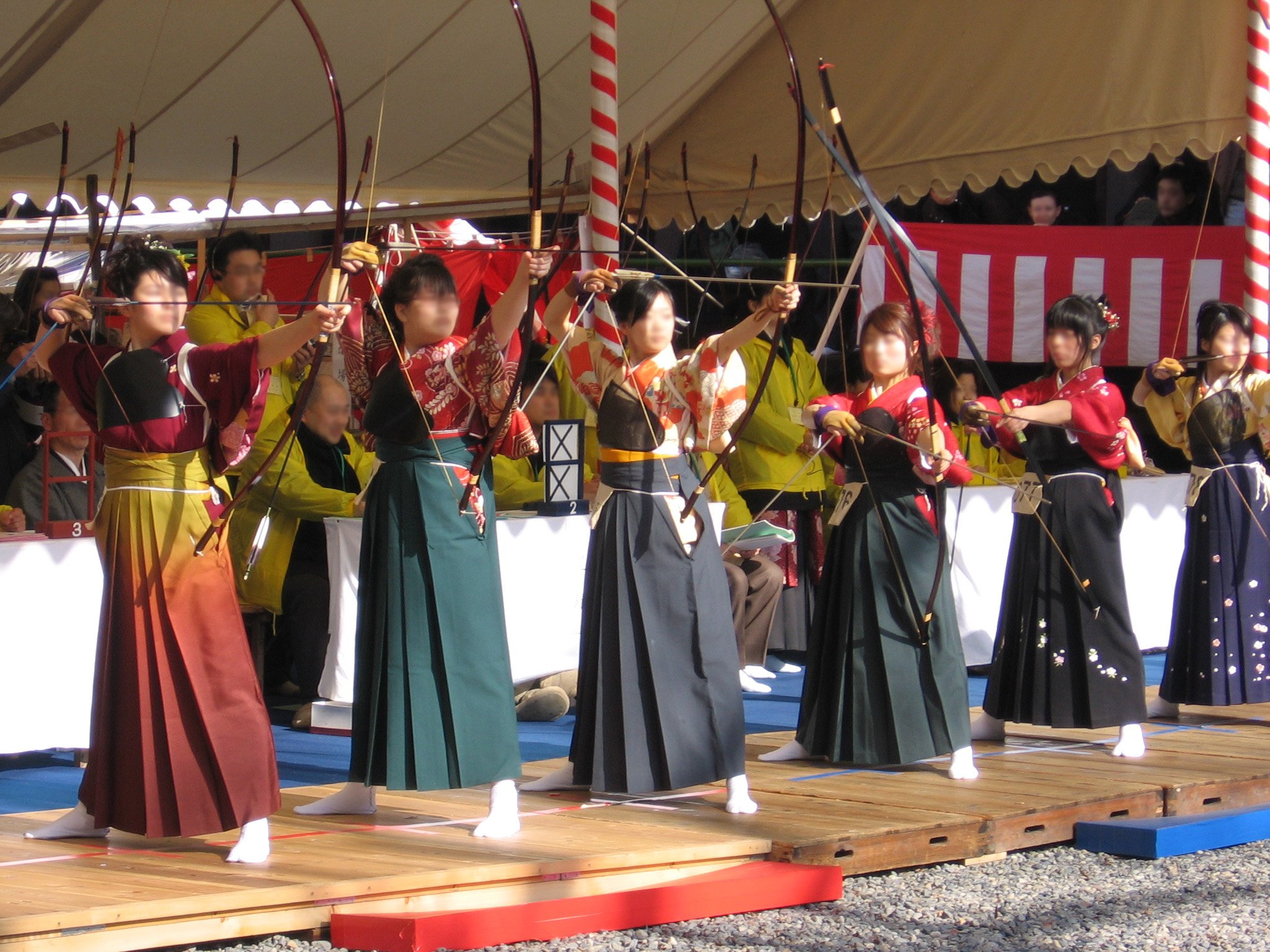
Young women in colorful kimono with hakama participate in Tōshiya

In 1861, after 255 years, the Tōshiya ceased being held, but a contest based on the Tōshiya called Ōmato Taikai, or Tournament of the Great Target still continues today, drawing roughly 2,000 participants from throughout Japan. Archers shoot arrows into targets approximately 50–100 cm (20–39 in) in diameter and 60 meters (198 feet) away at the opposite end of the veranda. It is held on the second Sunday of January in conjunction with the temple's most important mass, the Yanagi-no-Okaji, or Rite of the Willow ritual and Japan's Coming of Age Day.
