= Shihan Mato =

Shihan mato or shihan-mato (四半的) is a Japanese style of archery, mainly practiced in Miyazaki prefecture, employing a short bow, with the archer shooting from a sitting position. It is a separate style completely independent of and quite different from the other style of Japanese traditional archery, kyūdō. The style originated from what was the domain of the Shimazu clan (in modern-day Miyazaki Prefecture). It is sometimes referred to as a peasant style of archery. The Shimazu lord created the style so as to be able to arm his peasantry with bows, and thus increase the amount of archers in his forces. However, at the same time, so as to limit their ability to use the bows in a rebellion, the peasants were told to practice from a sitting position.

The distance to the target is approximately 8.2 m (27 ft), which is quite short. The bow is also quite short compared to the Japanese daikyu bow, conversely the arrows are extremely long, around 1.5 m (4 ft 11 in) in length. Shihan mato is very well known in Obi Nichinan, Miyazaki and it was regularly practiced in Obi Castle.

In the modern day, shihan mato is seen as a form of leisure activity. It is customary for people to drink and eat, then shoot in the shihan mato style. Clothing is a lot less formal than in other styles of Japanese archery, and the practitioners may wear any informal clothing.
