= Ya (arrow) =

Japanese word for arrow

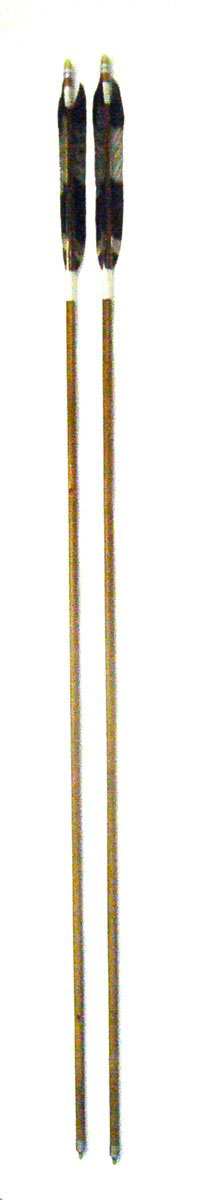
Two matoya, target practice arrows

Ya (矢, arrow) is the Japanese word for arrow, and commonly refers to the arrows used in kyūdō (弓道, Japanese archery). Ya also refers to the arrows used by samurai during the feudal era of Japan. Unlike Western arrows, the ya is close to a metre long or longer. Traditional ya are made from natural materials, usually bamboo, while modern ones may use aluminium or carbon fiber.

== Parts of the ya ==
=== No (shaft) ===
The no are made from yadake bamboo and can have different shapes – straight or tapered – depending on the use of the arrow in long-distance shooting or target practice. Lighter arrows can lose their stability when shot from a strong bow, heavier arrows have a trajectory that arcs more. Typically they use bamboo from the Kanto area. This is for a purely practical reason: bamboo will not grow fast enough in a cold area and the joints are too close together, whereas in a warm area the bamboo grows too fast and the joints are too far apart; the Kanto area has a moderate climate which makes the joints the perfect distance apart. The joints of the shaft help with the balance. After harvesting, bamboo continues to change in size and shape so it must rest for 2 1/2 to 3 years after cutting before it can be used. When it has aged the proper time the bamboo should provide a good tight grip around the tang of the yanone. The bamboo is tempered in a special kiln similar to the Viking beehive style and straightened with a tool called a tomegi, or "tree tame", which is also used when creating bamboo fishing poles. The appearance of the no varies; some are plain, while others glisten with red lacquer. The proper length is measured from the archer's throat to five centimeters beyond the tip of the outstretched left hand.

=== Fletching ===
The arrows are fletched with hane (feathers) about fifteen centimetres in length, and fletching can be the most expensive part of the arrow. Traditionally, the outermost tail feathers of large birds of prey were considered the finest. Many of these birds are now endangered – in particular the sea eagle – and therefore feathers of lesser eagles, swans, geese or even turkeys are being used in modern times. On the other hand, owl feathers were never used, as they were thought to be bringers of misfortune. Feathers from either the left and right wing may be used; these wing feathers naturally curve left or right. Ya with feathers from the left wing are called haya and they spiral clockwise, whereas ya made from the right wing feathers are called otoya and they spiraled counter-clockwise.

=== Nock ===
The nock or hazu is often made from goat or deer horn and archers file the slot to match the diameter of their own bowstring. Older or ceremonial ya can have bamboo nocks.

=== Arrowheads ===
Ya used for target practice have a conical iron tip called a ne.

Ya used in war by the samurai had a variety of tips called yajiri or yanone; these arrowheads were forged using the same steel (tamahagane) and methods as traditional Japanese swords. There are many different kinds of arrowhead and they all have their own special name. Togari-ya is a simple pointed design. The yanagi-ba, also known as "willow-leaf", is known for its elegant design. Karimata have a unique split point, and are sometimes referred to as "rope-cutters". The barbed "flesh-torn" is known as watakushi. The tagone-ya is shaped like a chisel. Kabura-ya was used for signalling and creating fear with the loud whistling noise it would produce.

Ya were large enough that they could be signed on the tang by the fletcher in the manner of Japanese swords.

== Gallery ==
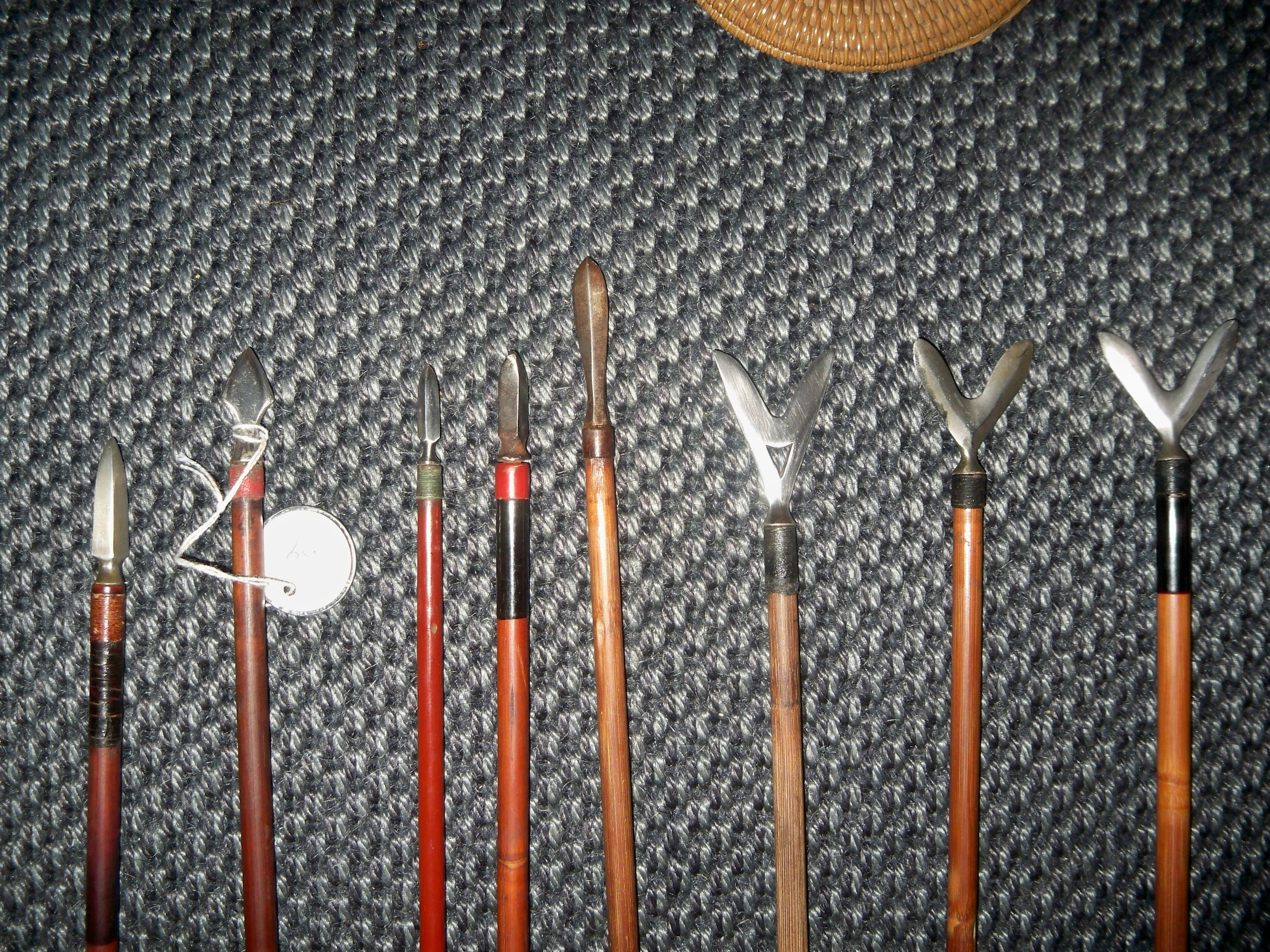
Antique Japanese (samurai) arrowheads yajiri or yanone

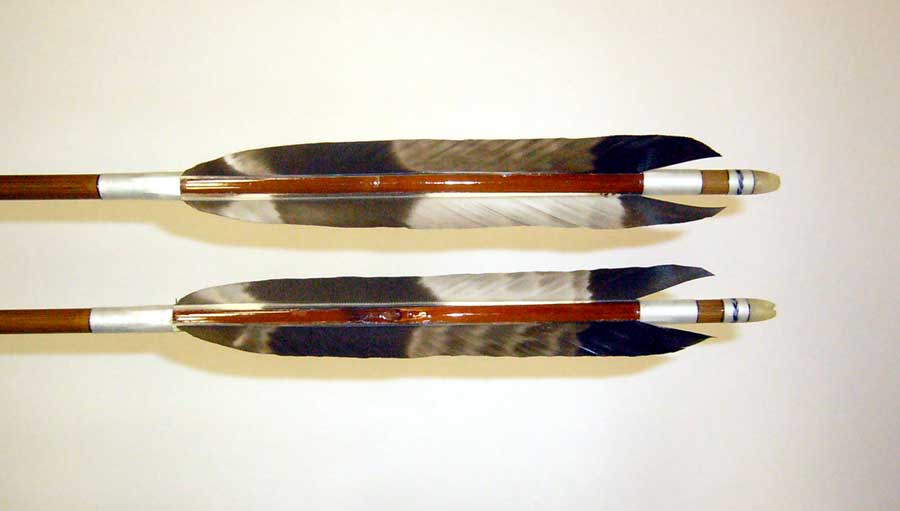
Japanese arrow ya showing the feathers or flights

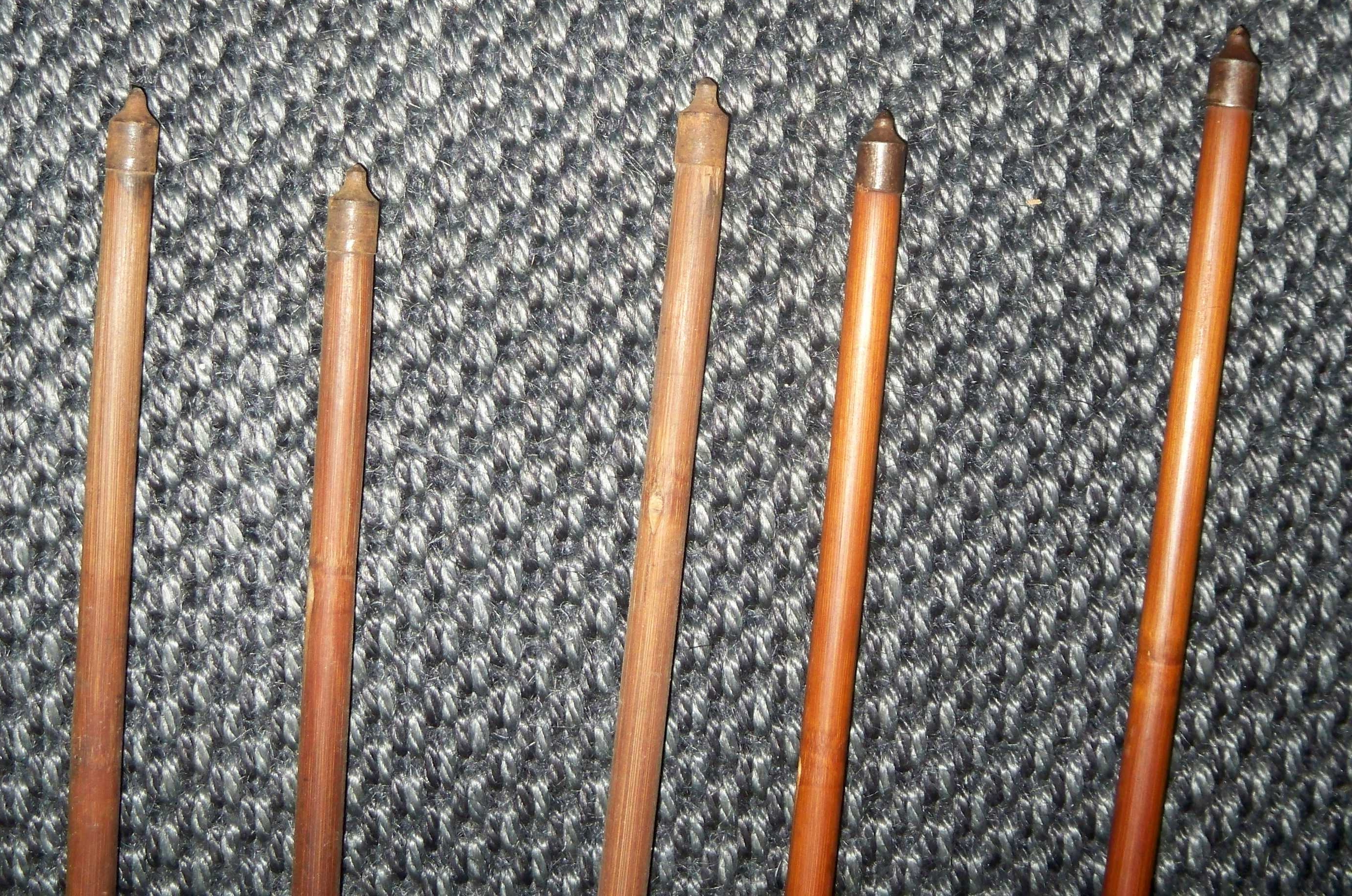
Antique Japanese target arrow tips (ne)

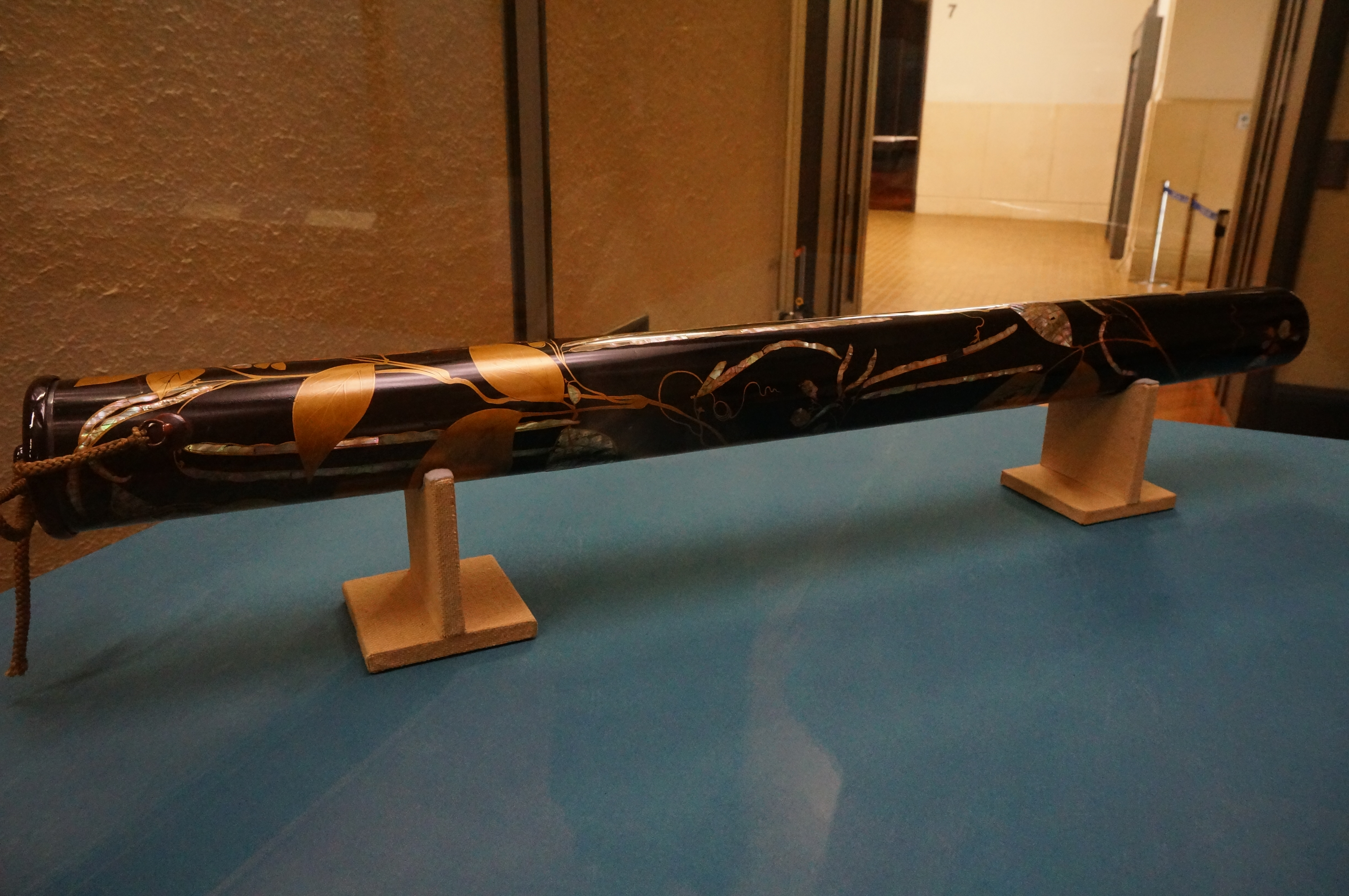
A yazutsu (quiver) decorated with maki-e. Edo period, 18th century. Tokyo National Museum.

== See also ==
- Bodkin point
- Crossbow bolt
- Fire arrow
- Kabura-ya (Japanese signal arrow) (鏑矢)
- Makiwara – a target, made from tightly-packed straw, for firing practice arrows in-to.
