= John Olsen (Australian artist) =

Australian artist (1928–2023)

John Olsen AO OBE
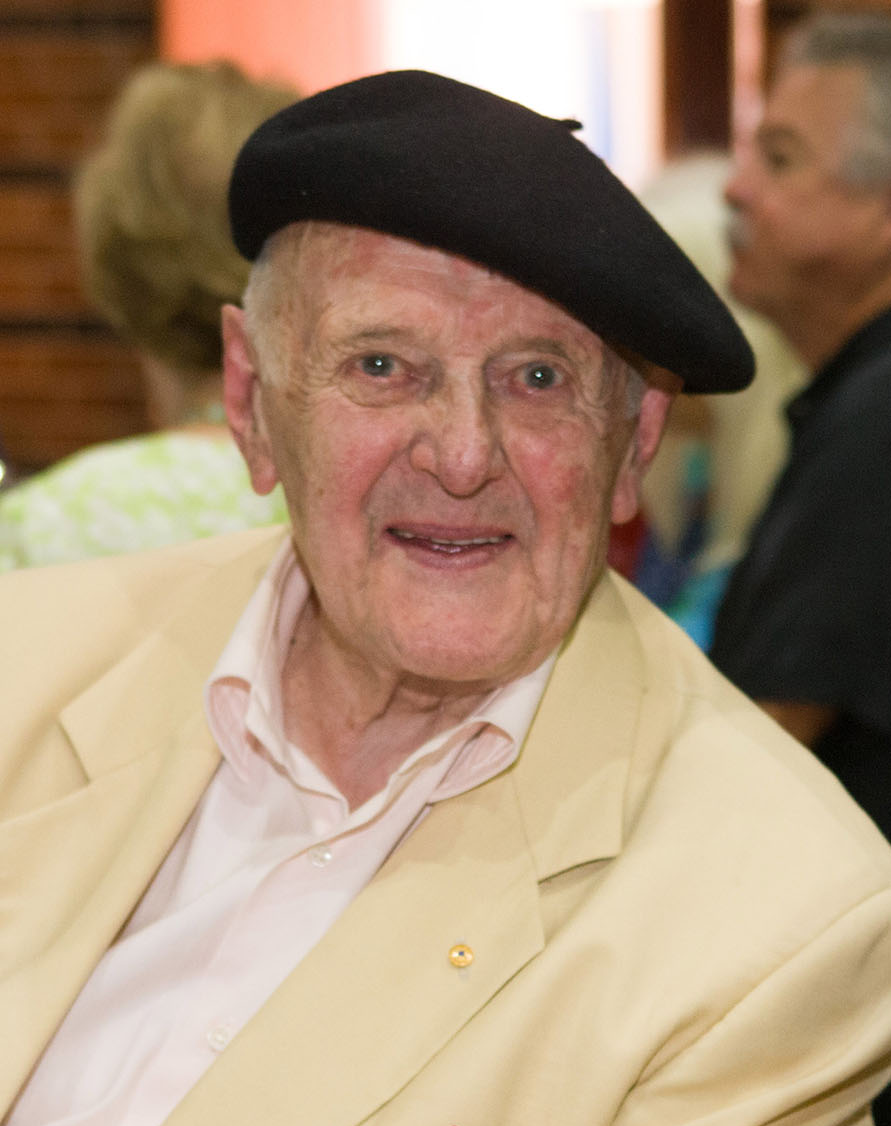
- Olsen in 2015
- Born: John Henry Olsen; 21 January 1928; Newcastle, New South Wales, Australia
- Died: 11 April 2023 (aged 95); Bowral, New South Wales, Australia
- Awards: Wynne Prize (1968, 1985); Sir John Sulman Prize; Archibald Prize (2005)

John Henry Olsen AO OBE (21 January 1928 – 11 April 2023) was an Australian artist and winner of the 2005 Archibald Prize. Olsen's primary subject of work was landscape.

== Early life and training ==
John Olsen was born in Newcastle on 21 January 1928. He moved to Bondi Beach with his family in 1935 and began a lifelong fascination with Sydney Harbour. He attended St Joseph's College, Hunters Hill.

After leaving school in 1943, he went to the Dattillo Rubbo Art School in 1947 and from 1950 to 1953 studied at the Julian Ashton Art School in Sydney, and Auburn School from 1950 to 1956. In 1957, Sydney business man, Robert Shaw and his then wife, Annette, supported by art critic Paul Haefliger sponsored Olsen to go to Europe and paint. After visiting London and Cornwall in England, he left for continental Europe.

Olsen studied printmaking at Stanley William Hayter's Atelier 17 etching studio in Paris in 1957, followed by two years in Deià, Spain.

== Career ==
Olsen sent works back from Spain for his first solo exhibition at Macquarie Galleries in Sydney, 6–8 August 1958. In the exhibition catalogue artist's statement, Olsen referred to Paul Klee's maxim of 'taking the line for a holiday.' Olsen returned to Sydney in 1960 and began teaching at East Sydney Technical College (now the National Art School) where he had also studied.

In Deià, Olsen learnt to cook from Elizabeth David's A Book of Mediterranean Food, instilling a life-long love affair with cooking and food. He also worked for brief periods in both Ibiza and Deià, as an apprentice chef. During this period, he was influenced by the Tachist artists Antoni Tàpies and Jean Dubuffet, the CoBrA group and Joan Miró. He also developed an interest in Eastern philosophy (specifically D.T. Suzuki's Zen and Japanese Culture and Eugen Herrigel's Zen in the Art of Archery) and poetry through his friendship with poet Robert Graves, which continued to inspire his work.

In 1968, Olsen set up and ran the Bakery Art School and in 1970, and was commissioned by the Sir William Dobell Art Foundation to paint a large mural entitled, 'Salute to Five Bells', which was inspired by Kenneth Slessor's poem and completed in 1973. Olsen's work is marked by a deep engagement with the Australian landscape and he lived for long periods in contrasting parts of the country and traveled widely in it. He served on the boards of the Art Gallery of New South Wales and the National Gallery of Australia.

Olsen published in 1982 The Artist and the Desert, co-written by Sandra McGrath who first wrote about Olsen in 1976 and who ardently collected his work, was considered by reviewer Dr. Ann Galbally a 'worthwhile exercise' in its examination of twenty-two painters 'to confront and illustrate the question [of] what has the desert landscape meant to the Australian artist,' its thesis being 'that the desert is really the "soul" place for the Australian psyche.' Galbally identifies 'a perceptive piece of writing which stands out in the otherwise rather uneven text, [in which] we are told that:'

In European landscapes, man is always there, has been there, in the foreground, in the middle distance or in the background. By contrast, in the Australian desert there seems to be no place for man at all; there seems no past, no present and no future; only an overwhelming withering of will and a numbing sense of despair.

== Art works ==
In 1960, Olsen painted Spanish Encounter which was acquired by the Art Gallery of NSW and exhibited at Terry Clune Galleries in Sydney. In the early 1960s, Olsen began painting ceilings, the first, 'Summer in the You Beaut Country', a commission from art dealer, Frank McDonald, followed by 'Darlinghurst Cats', 'Sea Sun and Five Bells' (gifted to the Newcastle Art Gallery in 2011 by Ann Lewis) and 'Life Burst' (commissioned by Thelma Clune, also in the Newcastle Art Gallery). 'Le Soleil' and 'La Primavera' were exhibited at Clune Galleries, with 'Sydney Sun' (as 'King Sun') exhibited at South Yarra Gallery, Melbourne in 1965.

His artworks include the Lake Eyre and frogs series. He was a regular visitor to Lake Eyre, in 2011 he was invited to be a member of the party in which Paul Lockyer and two other ABC employees died in a helicopter crash at the lake, but declined due to ill-health. He later offered a painting and a poem in memory of those killed.

His later works included Golden Summer, Clarendon. One of Olsen's most successful murals, Salute to Five Bells, is currently in the Sydney Opera House. Although he has been labelled as an abstract artist, Olsen rejected this label, stating, "I have never painted an abstract painting in my life". He described his work as "an exploration of the totality of landscape". Olsen published his diaries, under the title 'Drawn From Life', in 1997. Olsen's book My Salute to Five Bells which contains the artist's thoughts, diary entries and his original drawing for the work, was published by the National Library of Australia in 2015.

Olsen is well known for his paintings of frogs and for including frogs in many of his works. In 2013, he began work on his largest painting since Salute to Five Bells. Eight metres by six metres wide, on eight panels, The King Sun was hung in Collins Square in the Melbourne Docklands. The work depicts a brilliant Australian sun (including three frogs). Olsen and his work on the mural are the subject of 2014 documentary The King Sun, directed by New Zealander Tony Williams.

== Personal life ==
John Olsen lived near Bowral, New South Wales. In 1962, he married fellow artist Valerie Strong. His daughter Jane Olsen (with first wife Mary Flower), died in 2009. John Olsen was married to his third wife, artist Noela Hjorth until 1986 and married his fourth wife, Katharine Howard, in 1989. Katharine Howard died in 2016. Son of the Brush is a 2020 memoir by Tim Olsen about his life as the son of artist John Olsen.

His daughter Louise Olsen is a co-founder of cult Australian fashion jewellery label Dinosaur Designs.

=== Death ===
Olsen died on 11 April 2023, at his home near Bowral, New South Wales, at the age of 95.

Tributes were given by the Prime Minister of Australia, Anthony Albanese, and director of the National Gallery of Australia, Nick Mitzevich. ABC Television aired a tribute to Olsen's life.

== Awards ==
In Australia's New Year's Honours of 1977, Olsen was appointed an Officer of the Order of the British Empire; in 1993, he was awarded an Australian Creative Fellowship; and, in the Australia Day Honours of 2001, he was appointed an Officer of the Order of Australia. Additionally, he was awarded the Centenary Medal on 1 January 2001.

Olsen's early awards included the 1960 Rockdale Art Award, Arncliffe; the 1961 H.C. Richards Memorial Prize, Queensland Art Gallery, for Journey into you Beaut Country No 2, awarded by the judge of the competition, Russell Drysdale; the Perth Prize; and the Royal Easter Show A.E. Armstrong Art Prize for People who live in Victoria Street, exhibited as 'Painting' NFS. In 1964, he was awarded the Launceston Art Purchase Exhibition Prize, Tasmania, with Me, the Gardener.

Olsen was awarded the Wynne Prize in both 1969 for The Chasing Bird Landscape (1969) and 1985 for A Road to Clarendon: Autumn (1985). In 1989, Olsen won the Sulman (the Sir John Sulman Prize) with his work Don Quixote enters the Inn.

Olsen won the 2005 Archibald Prize for his portrait Self portrait Janus Faced.

== Exhibitions ==
Olsen's works have been exhibited at numerous solo and group shows across Australia and internationally.

- 2016 John Olsen: The You Beaut Country, National Gallery of Victoria, Melbourne (16 September 2016 – 12 February 2017)

== Collections ==
Olsen's work is represented in all Australian state gallery collections, including the Art Gallery of New South Wales (131 works); the National Gallery of Australia, Canberra; and regional galleries Australia-wide, including Newcastle Art Gallery, which holds several important works.

== Bibliography ==
- Hart, Deborah (1988). John Olsen. Melbourne, Vic.: Australian Galleries Pty Ltd in association with John Olsen. ISBN 0731623673.
- Hart, Deborah (1991). John Olsen. Sydney, NSW: Craftsman House. ISBN 9768097213.
- Spate, Virginia (1963). John Olsen. Melbourne, Vic: Georgian House.

Awards
Preceded by Craig Ruddy	Archibald Prize; 2005 for Self portrait Janus Faced	Succeeded by Marcus Wills
