= Kanjuro Shibata XX =

Japanese bowmaker (1921–2013)

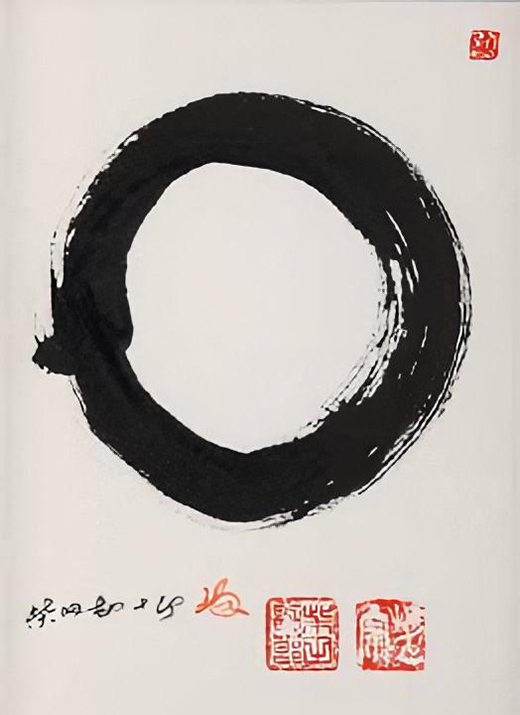
Ensō calligraphy by Kanjuro Shibata XX

On-yumishi Kanjuro Shibata XX (御弓師 二十代 柴田 勘十郎 Shibata Kanjūrō born 1921 in Kyoto, Japan, died on 21 October 2013 in Boulder, United States) was twentieth in a line of master bowmakers and a kyūdō teacher of the Heki Ryū Bishū Chikurin-ha (日置流尾州竹林派) tradition. Beginning in 1980, Shibata founded over 25 kyūdōjō in the United States, Canada and Europe.

== Career ==
Shibata served as the Bowmaker to the Emperor of Japan from 1959 until 1994, when his adopted son, Nobuhiro, was recognized as the 21st in the Shibata lineage and assumed the duties of Imperial Bowmaker.

== Teaching style ==
In Japan, Shibata became concerned that his students were too fixated on merely hitting the target, and were treating kyūdō as a sport rather than a meditative art. He felt they were becoming too competitive. Shibata thus represents a view of kyūdō different from the All Nippon Kyudo Federation (ANKF) and Japanese Budō Association. Rather than as a meditative art, ANKF promotes kyūdō as a traditional budō art combining equally both physical and mental development. These differences led Shibata to exclude his tradition from the official Japanese budō associations.

In 1980, Shibata accepted an invitation from Chögyam Trungpa Rinpoche to come to the United States and teach kyūdō, and founded the Ryūkō Kyūdōjō (龍虎弓道場 "dragon-tiger archery practice hall") in Boulder, Colorado; it is now called the Zenko Iba.

Shibata did not rank his students (i.e. no belt or dan system), and there was and is no testing or contests within the schools he founded.

== Quotations ==
With hearts as big as the autumn moon, we can magnetize the great heart of our enlightened lineage, the heart of the Vidydhara Chögyam Trungpa Rinpoche, and we can strengthen our family connection through meditation practice

— Kanjuro Shibata

One is not polishing one's shooting style or technique, but the mind. The dignity of shooting is the important point. This is how Kyudo differs from the common approach to archery. In Kyudo there is no hope. Hope is not the point. The point is that through long and genuine practice your natural dignity as a human being comes out. This natural dignity is already in you, but it is covered up by a lot of obstacles. When they are cleared away, your natural dignity is allowed to shine forth.

— Kanjuro Shibata

Too much thinking.

— Kanjuro Shibata

Perhaps you are thinking that neutrality is some sort of spiritual goal. This is not the case. Looking deeply at our hearts is the aim of spiritual practice. Kyudo practice is not neutral. Kyudo practice is about balance. Balance is not the same as neutrality. Neutrality only seeks the middle. In kyudo practice we are equally aware of the left, the right, the middle, all of it. How long have you been practicing? Once more again, practice. This is my hope.

— Kanjuro Shibata

== See also ==
- Japanese martial arts
- Yumi
