= Son of the Brush =

Memoir by Tim Olsen

- First edition cover
- Author: Tim Olsen
- Language: English
- Genre: Memoir, autobiography
- Published: 3 November 2020
- Publisher: Allen & Unwin
- Publication place: Australia
- Media type: Print (softcover)
- Pages: 496
- ISBN: 9781743318058

Son of the Brush is a 2020 memoir by Tim Olsen about his life as the son of artist John Olsen. It was published in Australia and New Zealand by Allen & Unwin. The book received positive reviews.
