= Kyūdō =

Japanese archery-based martial art

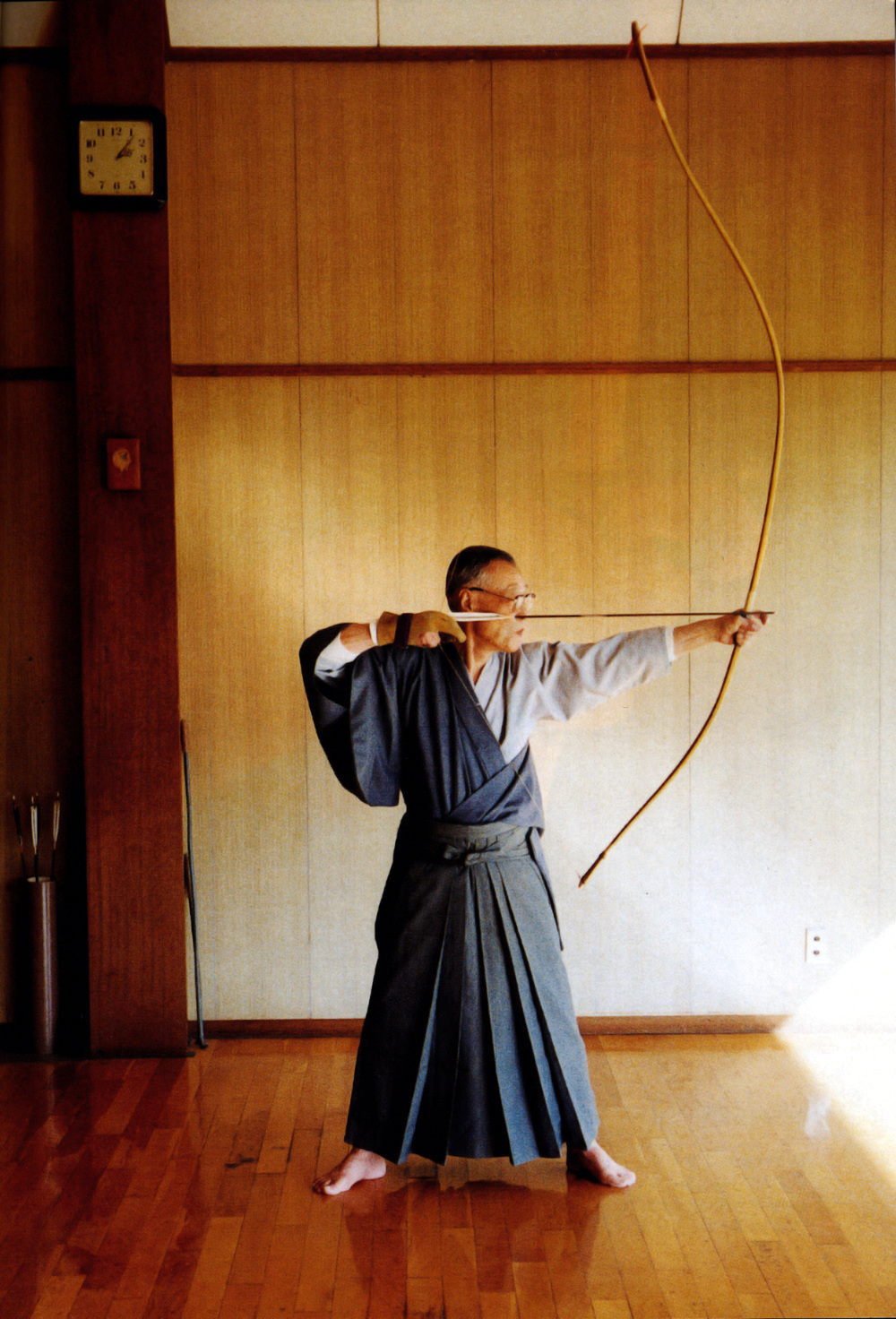
Inagaki Genshiro Hanshi 9. Dan does Kyūdō

Kyūdō (Japanese: 弓道) is the Japanese martial art of archery. Kyūdō is based on kyūjutsu ("art of archery"), which originated with the samurai class of feudal Japan. In 1919, the name of kyūjutsu was officially changed to kyūdō, and following the example of other martial arts that have been systematizing for educational purposes, kyūdō also reorganized and integrated various forms of shooting that had been used up until then. Many practitioners may refer to themselves as yumihiki (弓引き), or 'ones who draw the bow'. Kyūdō is practised by over a hundred thousand people worldwide. The bow used is called a yumi (弓). It has an asymmetrical shape and length of more than 2.0 metres (6 ft 7 in), and its use is characterized by the archer gripping the lower third of the bow stave to shoot.

Ceremonial Kyūdō, 2016

== History ==
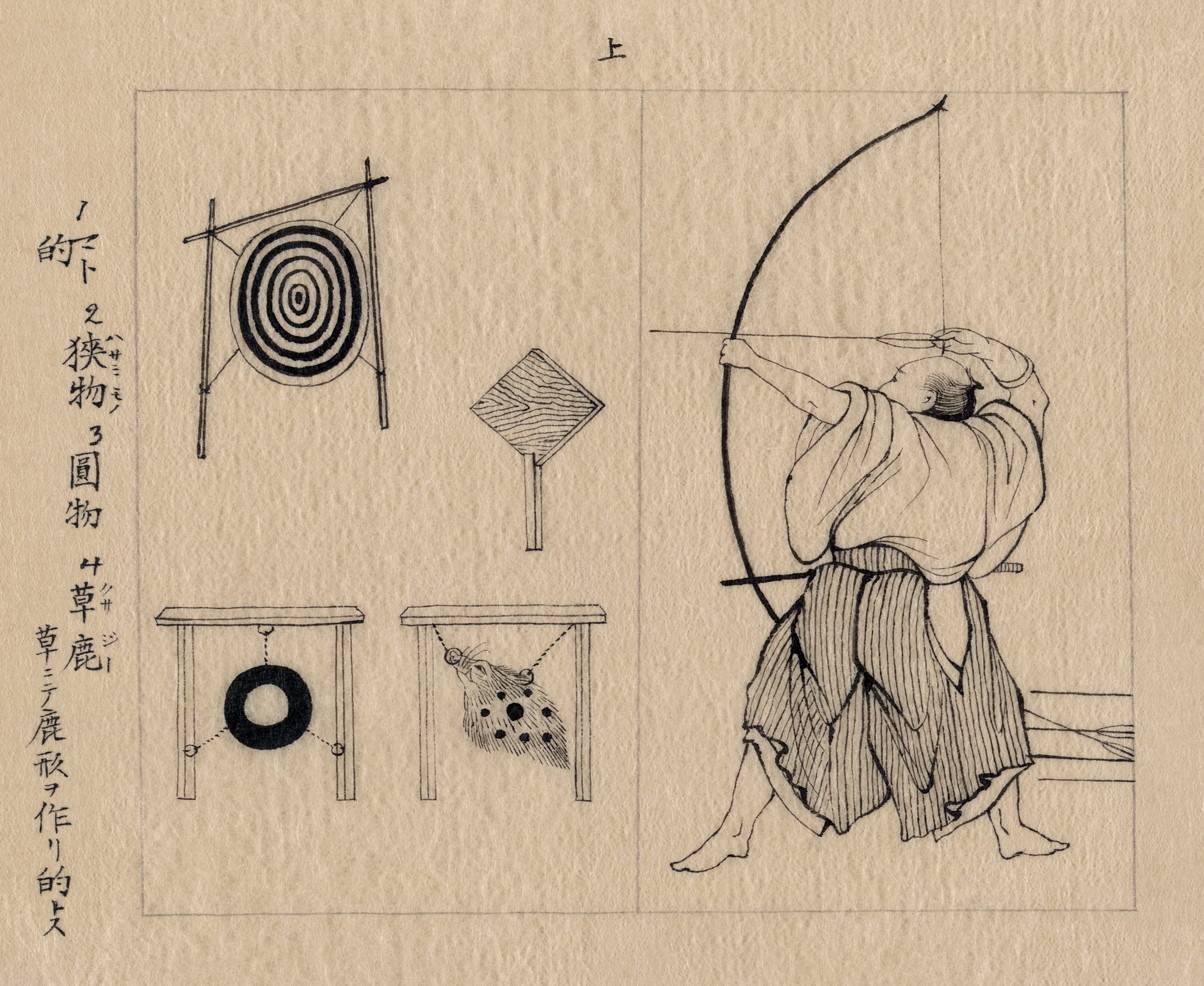
A Japanese archer with targets. Ink on paper, 1878.

The beginning of archery in Japan is pre-historical. The first images picturing the distinct Japanese asymmetrical longbow are found on Dōtaku from the Yayoi period (c. 500 BC – 300 AD).

=== Emergence ===
The changing of society and the samurai class taking power at the end of the Heian period (794－1185) created a requirement for education in archery. This led to the birth of the first kyūjutsu ryū-ha (流派, style), the Henmi-ryū (逸見流), founded by Henmi Kiyomitsu (ja:源清光) in the 12th century. The Takeda-ryū (ja:武田流) and the mounted archery school Ogasawara-ryū (ja:小笠原流) were later founded by his descendants. The need for archers grew dramatically during the Genpei War (1180–1185) and as a result the founder of the Ogasawara-ryū, Ogasawara Nagakiyo,

During the Kamakura period (1185–1333), when Minamoto no Yoritomo established the Kamakura shogunate, archery became more and more popular, especially the three types of mounted archery: yabusame, inuoumono, and kasagake.

=== Sengoku period ===
From the 15th to the 16th century, Japan was ravaged by civil war. In the latter part of the 15th century Heki Danjō Masatsugu revolutionized archery with his new and accurate approach called hi, kan, chū (fly, pierce, center), and his footman's archery spread rapidly. Many new schools were formed, some of which remain today, such as Heki-ryū Chikurin-ha (ja:日置流竹林派), Heki-ryū Sekka-ha (日置流雪荷派) and Heki-ryū Insai-ha (日置流印西派).

=== 16th century ===
The yumi (Japanese bow) as a weapon of war began its gradual decline after the Portuguese arrived in Japan in 1543 bringing firearms with them in the form of the matchlock. The Japanese soon started to manufacture their own version of the matchlock called tanegashima and eventually it and the yari (spear) became the weapons of choice. However, because tanegashima took a long time to load, were inconvenient in rainy weather when damp gunpowder would not fire, and were not exactly subtle in terms of noise, the yumi did not go out of fashion and continued to be used as an important military force on the battlefield. The tanegashima however did not require the same amount of training as a yumi, allowing Oda Nobunaga's army consisting mainly of farmers armed with tanegashima to annihilate a traditional samurai archer cavalry in a single battle in 1575.

=== Edo period ===
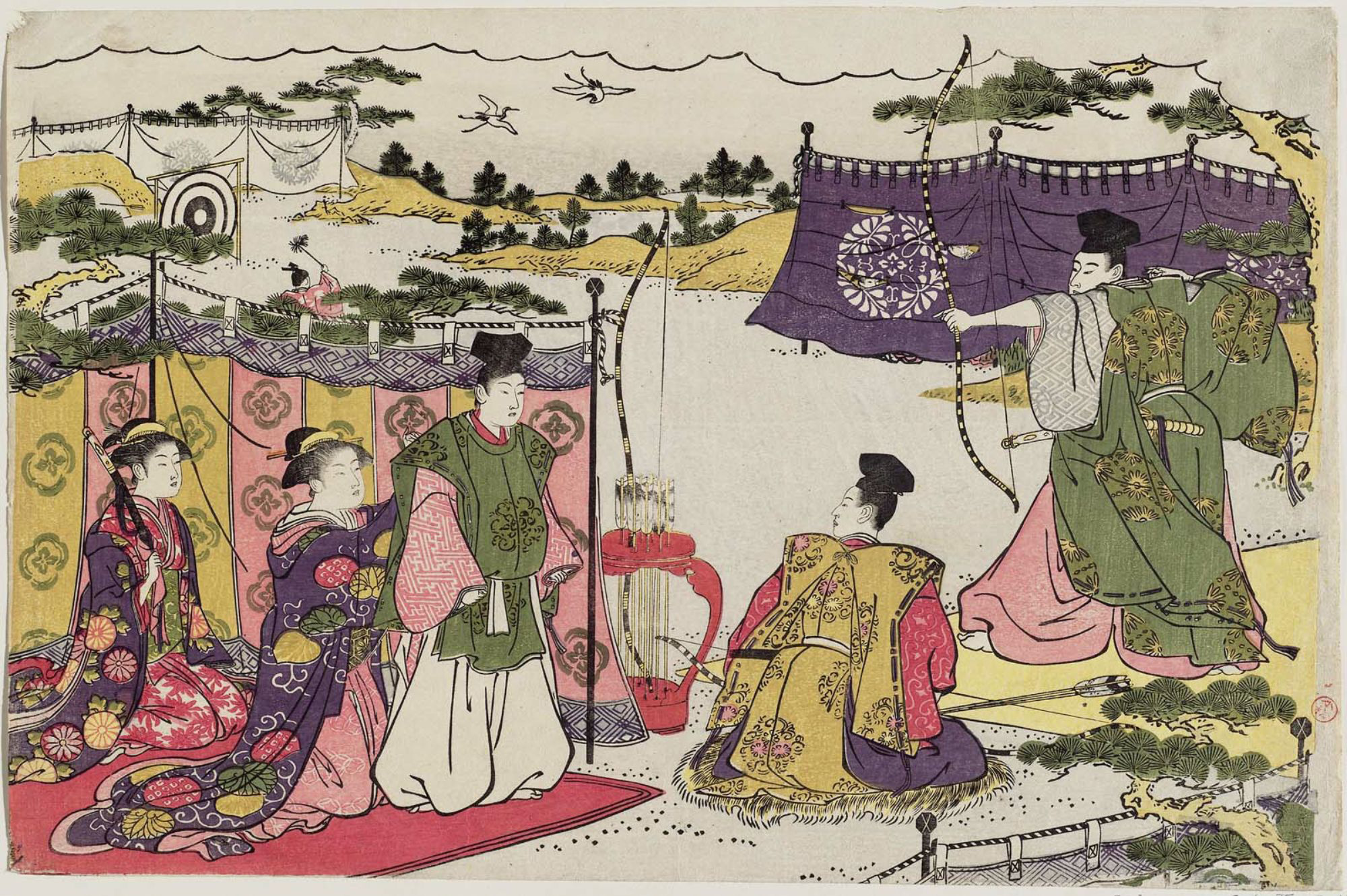
First Archery of the New Year by Torii Kiyonaga (1787)

During the Edo period (1603–1868) Japan was turned inward as a hierarchical caste society in which the samurai were at the top. There was an extended era of peace during which the samurai moved to administrative duty, although the traditional fighting skills were still esteemed. During this period archery became a "voluntary" skill, practised partly in the court in ceremonial form, partly as different kinds of competition. During this period, an archery contest called Tōshiya was popularly held at the Buddhist temple Sanjusangen-do. Many samurai competed to hit an arrow at a target 133 meters away, nearly the width of the Buddhist temple. Today, this Tōshiya contest is held as an annual event on Coming of Age Day, January 15, with women archers participating, but with the distance to the target shortened to 60 meters.

In the early Edo period, Morikawa Kōzan founded the Yamato-ryū (ja:大和流), which was based on Ogasawara-ryū etiquette and Heki-ryū shooting methods, and also incorporated Shinto ideas.

=== Revival ===
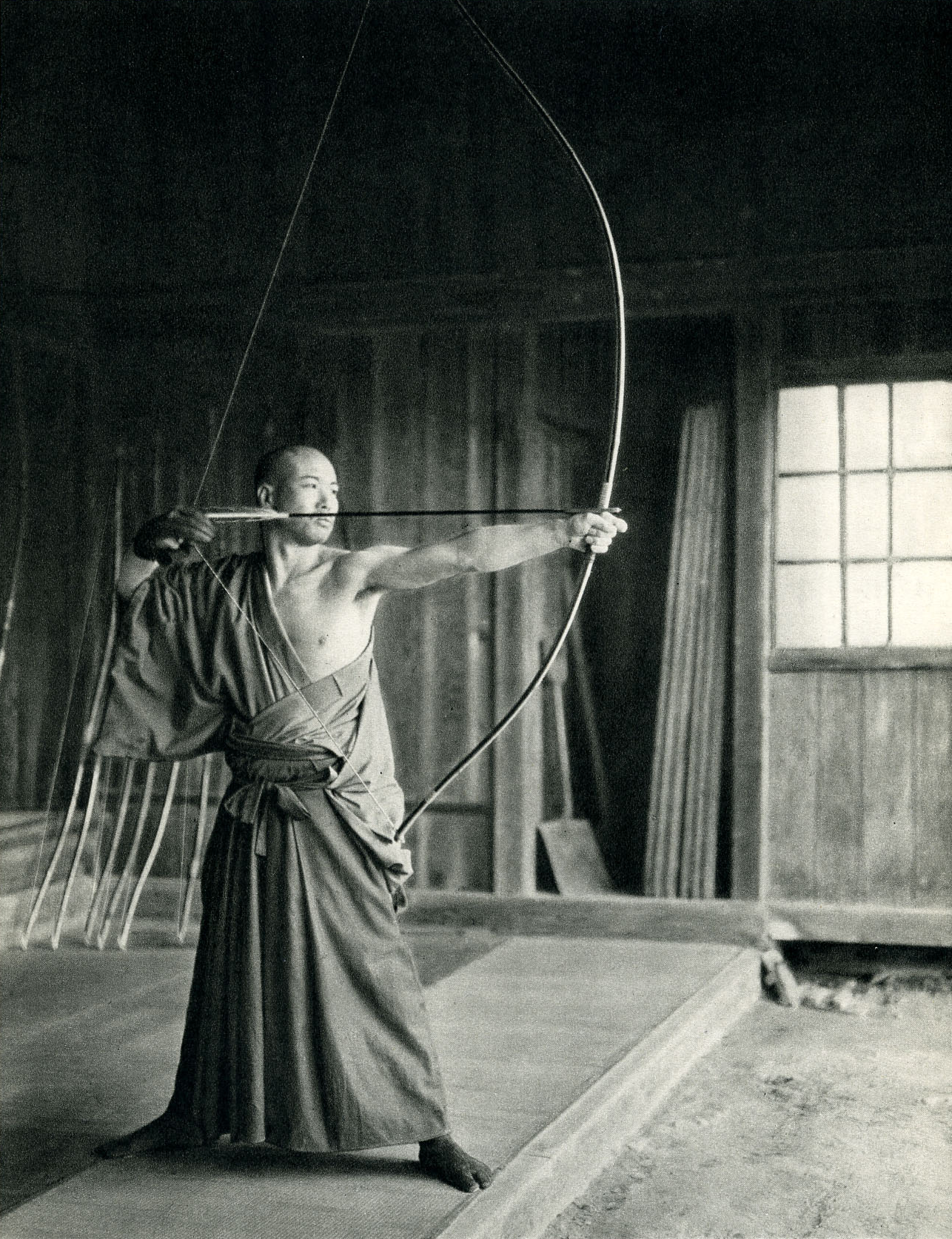
Kyudoka draws a daikyu (大弓) (longbow)

During the changes to Japan brought by opening up to the outside world at the beginning of the Meiji era (1868–1912), the samurai lost their status. Therefore, kyūjutsu was considered obsolete and began to decline. Kyūjutsu practitioners established dojos to survive and began to spread among the common people. Kyūjutsu was first adopted as a subject in school education in 1895, encouraged by its beginning to spread among the common people. In 1896, a group of kyūjutsu masters gathered to save traditional archery. Honda Toshizane, the kyūjutsu teacher for the Imperial University of Tokyo, merged the war and ceremonial shooting styles, creating a hybrid called Honda-ryū (ja:本多流生弓会). From 1919, the name of "kyūjutsu" was gradually replaced within clubs and events with the term "kyūdō", with "kyūjutsu" disappearing completely by 1933. A mixed-style form was created by blending Ogasawara-ryū, Honda-ryū, and Heki-ryū, which was called kyūdō yosoku. A ranking system for kyūdō was established in 1923. Kyūdō also reorganized and integrated various other forms of shooting. Due to the abolishing of the original Dai Nippon Butoku Kai after WWII (re-established in 1953), several martial arts disciplines created their own organizations. Guidelines published in the 1953 book Kyudo Manual (弓道教本, kyūdō kyōhon) define how, in a competition or graduation, archers from different schools can shoot together in unified form.

== Purpose ==
Kyūdō is practiced in many different schools, some of which descend from military shooting and others that descend from ceremonial or contemplative practice. Therefore, the emphasis is different. Some emphasize aesthetics and others efficiency. Contemplative schools teach the form as a meditation in action. In certain schools, to shoot correctly will result inevitably in hitting the desired target. For this a phrase seisha hicchū (正射必中), "true shooting, certain hitting", is used.

According to the All Nippon Kyudo Federation, the supreme goal of kyūdō is the state of shin-zen-bi (真善美), roughly "truth-goodness-beauty", which can be approximated as: when archers shoot correctly (i.e. truthfully) with virtuous spirit and attitude toward all persons and all things which relate to kyūdō (i.e. with goodness), beautiful shooting is realized naturally.

Kyūdō practice, as in all budō, includes the idea of moral and spiritual development. Today many archers practice kyūdō as a sport, with marksmanship being paramount. However, the goal most devotees of kyūdō seek is seisha seichū (正射正中), "correct shooting is correct hitting". In kyūdō the unique action of expansion (nobiai; 伸合い) that results in a natural release is sought. When the technique of the shooting is correct the result is that the arrow hits the target. To give oneself completely to the shooting is the spiritual goal, achieved by perfection of both the spirit and shooting technique leading to munen musō (無念無想), "no thoughts, no illusions". This however is not Zen, although Japanese bow can be used in Zen-practice or kyūdō practiced by a Zen master. In this respect, many kyūdō practitioners believe that competition, examination, and any opportunity that places the archer in this uncompromising situation is important, while other practitioners will avoid competitions or examinations of any kind.

Kyūdō itself is not a religion, but instead has influences from both Shinto and Zen. Post Meiji when bows were no longer used for war, kyūdō in Japan was practiced for physical education, without any connection to zen or religion. However, since the Second World War, kyūdō has often been associated with Zen Buddhism, largely due to the efforts of a single book, Zen in the Art of Archery (1948) by the German author Eugen Herrigel. Herrigel spoke only a little Japanese, generally using a translator to speak with his teacher. His view on kyūdō is due his exposure to a contemplative form of kyūdō. Even so, Herrigel's book, when translated into Japanese in 1956, had a huge impact on the perception of kyūdō also in Japan.

Zenko (a Heki-ryū Bishu Chikurin-ha school of kyūdō) is affiliated closely with Shambhala Buddhism and was founded in the United States in the 1980s by Kanjuro Shibata XX. It has groups practicing in the United States and a group in Canada.

== Dōjō ==
Kyūdō dōjō (training halls, aka "kyūdōjō") vary in style and design from school to school, and from country to country. In Japan, most dōjō have roughly the same layout; an entrance, a large dōjō area, typically with a wooden floor and a high ceiling, a position for practice targets (called makiwara; 巻藁), and a large open wall with sliding doors, which, when opened, overlooks an open grassy area and a separate building, the matoba (的場), which houses a sand hillock and the targets, placed 28 metres from the dōjō floor.

== Practice ==
Kyūdō is practiced in different schools and styles, and even between dōjō of the same style, the form of practice can vary. To harmonize practice and ceremonial shooting (sharei; 的礼) in 1953 the All Nippon Kyudo Federation (ANKF) formed an establishing committee from the main schools to take the best elements of each school and form the general style that is used today throughout Japan and in most kyūdō federations in the west. This standard form was documented in a manual, Kyudo Manual, Principles of Shooting, published in 1953. The ANKF is the governing body for kyūdō in Japan, and oversees the majority of kyūdō clubs and events in kyūdō.

In kyūdō there are three kinds of practice (keiko; 稽古): mitori geiko (見取り稽古) – receiving with the eyes the style and technique of an advanced archer, kufū geiko (工夫稽古) – learning and keeping in mind the details of the technique and spiritual effort to realize it and kazu geiko (数稽古) – repetition through which the technique is personified in one's own shooting.

Kyūdō is different to other martial arts, in that it is largely static. It can be enjoyed competitively, or as a simple recreation. It can also be enjoyed by those seeking to gain the beauty of form.

Beginners start with a rubber practice bow and by practising the movements of hassetsu (八節). The second step for a beginner is to do karabiki (空引) training with a bow without an arrow to learn handling of the bow and performing hassetsu until full draw. Handling and maintenance of the equipment is also part of the training. After given permission by the teacher beginners start practicing with the glove and arrow. Next steps may vary from teacher to teacher, but include practising first yugamae (弓構え), then the draw and last release and shooting at makiwara. A beginner starting to shoot at the mato (的) may be asked to shoot from half or three-quarters of the usual distance.

Advanced beginners and advanced shooters practice shooting at makiwara, mato and some with omato.

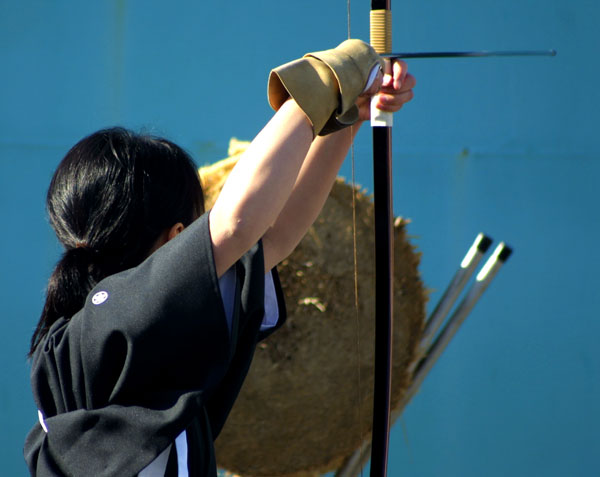
A kyūdō practitioner shooting at a makiwara

Makiwara is a specially designed straw target (not to be confused with makiwara used in karate). The makiwara is shot at from a very close range (about seven feet, or the length of the archer's strung yumi when held horizontally from the centerline of the archer's body). Because the target is so close and the shot most certainly will hit, the archer can concentrate on refining technique rather than on the arrow's arc.

Mato is the normal target for most kyūdō practitioners. Mato sizes and shooting distances vary, but most common is hoshi mato (星的) thirty-six centimeters (or 12 cun, a traditional Japanese measurement equivalent to approximately 30.3 cm) in diameter shot at from a distance of twenty-eight metres. For competitions and examinations, kasumi mato (霞的) is used. For ceremonies it is most common to use hoshi mato which is the same as kasumi mato but with different markings.

Omato is the mato used for long distance enteki (遠的) shooting at 60 m distance. The diameter of omato is 158 cm. There are separate competitions also for enteki shooting.

There are three levels of skill:

1. Tōteki, the arrow hits the target.
2. Kanteki, the arrow pierces the target.
3. Zaiteki (在的), the arrow exists in the target.

== Equipment ==
The yumi (弓) lit. '[Japanese] bow' is exceptionally tall (standing over two metres), surpassing the height of the archer. Yumi shafts are traditionally made of bamboo, wood and leather using techniques which have not changed for centuries, although some archers (particularly, those new to the art) may use synthetic (i.e. laminated wood coated with glassfibre or carbon fiber) yumi. Even advanced practitioners may own non-bamboo bows and arrows because of the vulnerability of bamboo equipment to extreme climates. The suitable height for the bow depends on the archer's draw (yazuka; 矢束) which is about half the archer's height.

Ya (矢) lit. '[Japanese] arrow' shafts (yagara (簳) are traditionally made of bamboo, with either eagle or hawk feathers (hane (羽). Most ya shafts today are still made of bamboo (although some archers will use shafts made of aluminium or carbon fibres), and ya feathers are now obtained from non-endangered birds such as turkeys or swans. The length of an arrow is the archer's yatsuka plus 6–10 cm (2.4–3.9 in). Every ya has a spinning direction being made from feathers from alternate sides of the bird, the haya spins clockwise upon release while the otoya spins counter-clockwise. Kyūdō archers usually shoot two ya per round, with the haya being shot first (haya (甲矢) means first arrow; otoya (乙矢) means second arrow). It is often said that the alternate spinning direction of the arrows would prevent two consecutive identically shot arrows from flying identically and thus colliding. The arrowhead is called a yajiri (鏃). Ya are normally kept in a cylindrical quiver, called a yazutsu (矢筒) lit. '[Japanese] arrow barrel', with ceremonial and traditional archers using the yebira (箙) lit. '[Japanese] quiver (of arrows)'.

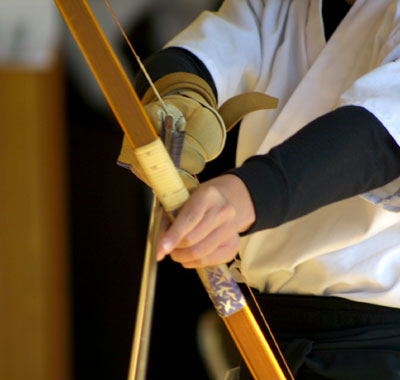
A three-fingered glove, or mitsugake

The kyūdō archer wears a glove on the right hand, called a yugake (弽) lit. 'yumi gloves'. There are many varieties of yugake; they are typically made of deerskin. Practitioners can choose between a hard glove (with a hardened thumb) or a soft glove (without a hardened thumb); each has its advantages.

With a hard glove, the thumb area is not very flexible and has a pre-made groove used to pull the string (tsuru (弦). With a soft glove, the thumb area is very flexible and is without a pre-made groove, allowing the practitioners to create their own, based on their own shooting habits.

Typically a yugake will be of the three- or four-finger variety. The three-fingered version is called a mitsugake (三つ弽), and the four-fingered version is called a yotsugake (四つ弽). Typically the primary reason an archer may choose a stronger glove like the yotsugake is to assist in pulling heavier bows (18–20 kg (40–44 lb) and above). The three-fingered glove is generally used with bows with a pull below 20 kg (44 lb) of draw weight, while the four fingered yotsugake are used with bows with a pull above 20 kg (44 lb). This is only a generalization and many schools differ on which glove to use for their bows and glove use often varies from archer to archer and school to school.

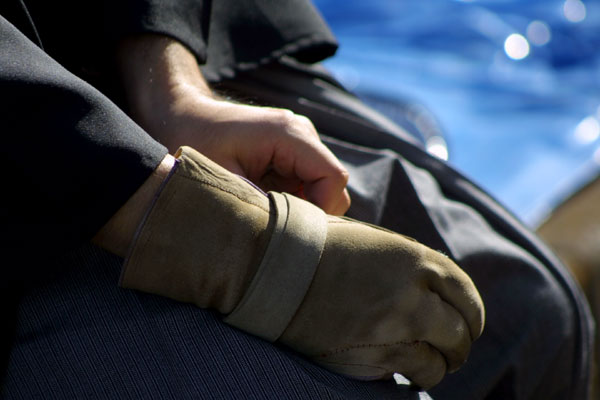
A kyūdō archer preparing his yotsugake, or four-fingered glove

The practical reasoning for the extra finger on the glove stems from having more surface area available to the archer for the heavier draws. During the draw, the thumb of the archer is typically placed on the last gloved finger of the drawing hand, with the first (or, in the case of a yotsugake, the first and index fingers) being placed gently on either the thumb or the arrow shaft itself. Sometimes a type of resin powder, called giriko (ぎり粉), is applied to the thumb and holding finger to assist in the grip during the pull. The extra finger allows for a stronger hold on the thumb, as it is then placed on the third finger of the hand instead of the second. Some schools, such as Heki-ryū Insai-ha only use the three-fingered glove, even with bows above 40 kilograms.

The one-finger glove, called an ippongake (一本粉), is generally used for beginners and covers only the thumb. Some versions have a full wrist covering and others simply cover the thumb with a small strap and snap around the wrist. Because it has no glove over the fingers, it is typically uncomfortable for the archer to use giriko powder. Ippongake are generally not used by advanced archers, and are not allowed in ANKF competitions.

The five-finger glove, called a morogake (諸粉), is used almost exclusively by Ogasawara-ryū practitioners, and is not typically used in competition or by any other school.

A practitioner's nock and grip of the arrow can be dictated by the glove and bow being used. It is not uncommon for practitioners who have upgraded or downgraded bow weight to continue to use the same glove and not change.

With the exception of the ippongake, the yugake is worn with an underglove called a shitagake (下粉) made of cotton or synthetic cloth, mainly to protect the yugake from sweat which would degrade the deerskin of the glove over time. The shitagake comes in two varieties, three-fingered and four-fingered, depending on whether it is used under the mitsugake or the yotsugake.

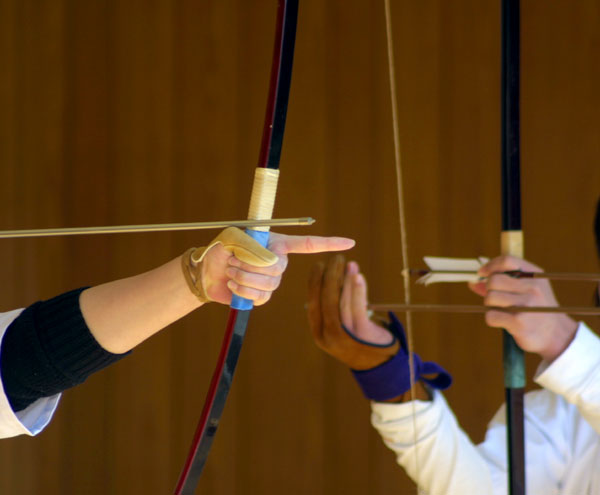
An oshidegake on the bow arm of a kyūdō practitioner

Because of the unique shooting technique of kyūdō, protection on the left (bow) arm is not generally required. The bow string, when properly released, will travel around the bow hand, coming to rest on the outside of the arm. However, on rare occasions a bow hand glove, called an oshidegake (押手弽), is used, which serves to protect the left thumb from injury from the arrow and fletching. A forearm protector can also be worn, primarily by beginners, to protect the left arm from being hit by the string.

Powder made of burnt rice husks called fudeko (筆粉) is applied to the hand that holds the bow to absorb sweat, allowing the bow to turn in the hand.

Female archers also wear a chest protector called a muneate (胸当て) (yumi plastron/chestguard), which is generally a piece of leather or plastic which is designed to protect the breasts from being struck by the bowstring during shooting.

Because repeated usage tends to weaken the bowstring, it is not uncommon for a bowstring to break during shooting. Hence, many archers carry spare strings in what is called a tsurumaki (弦巻; "bow string roll"). Traditional tsurumaki are flat yoyo-shaped carriers made of woven bamboo, typically with a leather strap. Recently, however, plastic tsurumaki are also coming into use.

Many archers also have small containers of fudeko and giriko attached to the end of the tsurumaki strap; these containers are called fudeko-ire (筆粉入れ) and giriko-ire (ぎり粉入れ) and are traditionally made of horn or antler (though many modern archers have fudeko-ire and giriko-ire made of plastic).

== Technique ==
All kyūdō archers hold the bow in their left hand and draw the string with their right, so that all archers face the higher position (kamiza; 上座) while shooting.

Kyūdō archers draw the bow so that the drawing hand is held behind the ear. If done improperly, upon release the string may strike the archer's ear or side of the face.

Resulting from the technique to release the shot, the bow will (for a practised archer) spin in the hand so that the string stops in front of the archer's outer forearm. This action of yugaeri (弓返り) is a combination of technique and the natural working of the bow. It is unique to kyūdō.

Kyūdō technique is meticulously prescribed. Different styles have their own variations from the steps, the most notable difference being between the vertical bow rising shomen (正面) and aslant bow rising shamen (斜面). The hassetsu (or "eight stages of shooting") of the shomen style is described in the Kyudo Kyohon ("Kyudo Manual"):

1. Ashibumi (足踏み), placing the footing. The archer steps onto the line from where arrows are shot (known as the shai; 射位) and turns to face the kamiza, so that the left side of the archer's body faces the target. The archer then sights from the target to the feet and with the feet set apart so that the distance between them is equal to the archer's yazuka, about half his body height, and equal to the length of an arrow. A line drawn between the archer's toes should pass through the target after the completion of the ashibumi. During competition, an archer may have a second set of arrows sitting on the ground at the feet. To be correct in ashibumi, these arrows must not extend in front of or behind the archer's footing stance. The archer's feet are then placed outward at a 60 degree angle from each other, forming a "V", this ensures equal balance to both feet.
2. Dōzukuri (胴造り), forming the body. The archer verifies balance and that the pelvis and the line between the shoulders are parallel to the line set up during ashibumi. During dōzukuri, the kyūdō practitioner will straighten the back and posture, forming a straight line from shoulders to feet. Practically this is to prevent the bowstring from striking the archer's face when shooting.
3. Yugamae (弓構え), readying the bow. Yugamae consists of three phases:
  1. Torikake (取り掛け), gripping of the bowstring with the right hand.
  2. Tenouchi (手の内), the left hand is positioned for shooting on the bow's grip.
  3. Monomi (物見), the archer turns the head to gaze at the target.
4. Uchiokoshi (打起し), raising the bow. The archer raises the bow above the head to prepare for the draw.
5. Hikiwake (引分け), drawing apart. The archer starts bringing down the bow while spreading his arms, simultaneously pushing the bow with the left hand and drawing the string with the right.
  1. Daisan (大三), "Big Three." This forms the midway point in Hikiwake.
6. Kai (会), the full draw. The archer continues the movement started in the previous phase, until full draw is achieved with the arrow placed slightly below the cheekbone or level with the mouth. The arrow points along the line set up during ashibumi.
  1. Tsumeai (詰合い), constructing the vertical and horizontal lines of the body.
  2. Nobiai (伸合い), uniting the expansions of the body.
7. Hanare (離れ), the release. The technique results in the bowstring being released from the right hand and the right arm extending behind the archer.
8. Zanshin (残心), "the remaining body or mind" or "the continuation of the shot". The archer remains in the position reached after hanare while returning from the state of concentration associated with the shot.
  1. Yudaoshi (弓倒し), lowering of the bow.

Throughout the process, the kyūdō practitioner maintains ritual breathing between each action, which creates ma-ai between intervals.

While other schools' shooting also conforms to the hassetsu outlined above, the naming of some steps and some details of the execution of the shot may differ.

== Rankings ==
Kyūdō ranking system was established by the DNBK in 1923, using a system which is now common to modern budō (martial art) practices. Most kyūdō federations periodically hold examinations, which, if the archer passes, permits them to register for a grade, which can be kyū or dan level. Traditional schools, however, often rank students as a recognition of their achievement and as permission to instruct at various levels using the older menkyo (license) system of koryū budō.

One's first shinsa is generally mushitei (unspecified), the performance in which will determine one's first rank. Generally the 3rd, 2nd, and 1-kyū ranks are more common among students, while adults will sometimes skip the kyū ranks entirely and move straight on 1-dan, though this depends significantly on the policy of the regional federation. Dan test frequency also varies depending on location, occurring anywhere as often as 4 times a year to as rarely as only once or twice a year. Such tests are generally held by the prefecture kyūdō federation and the archer may have to travel quite a distance to the prefectural capital or a large city to test. Often testing includes many archers and may take as much as 6 to 8 hours to test all of the different levels, though the COVID-19 pandemic did result in temporary changes in how testing was run. One of these changes was the introduction of video shinsa that could be submitted to reduce the need to travel as well the risk of infection - an approach that was later extended to overseas practitioners testing up to 2-dan.

While kyūdō's system of kyū and dan levels are similar to those of other budō practices, colored belts or similar external symbols of one's level are not worn by kyūdō practitioners.

== Competition ==
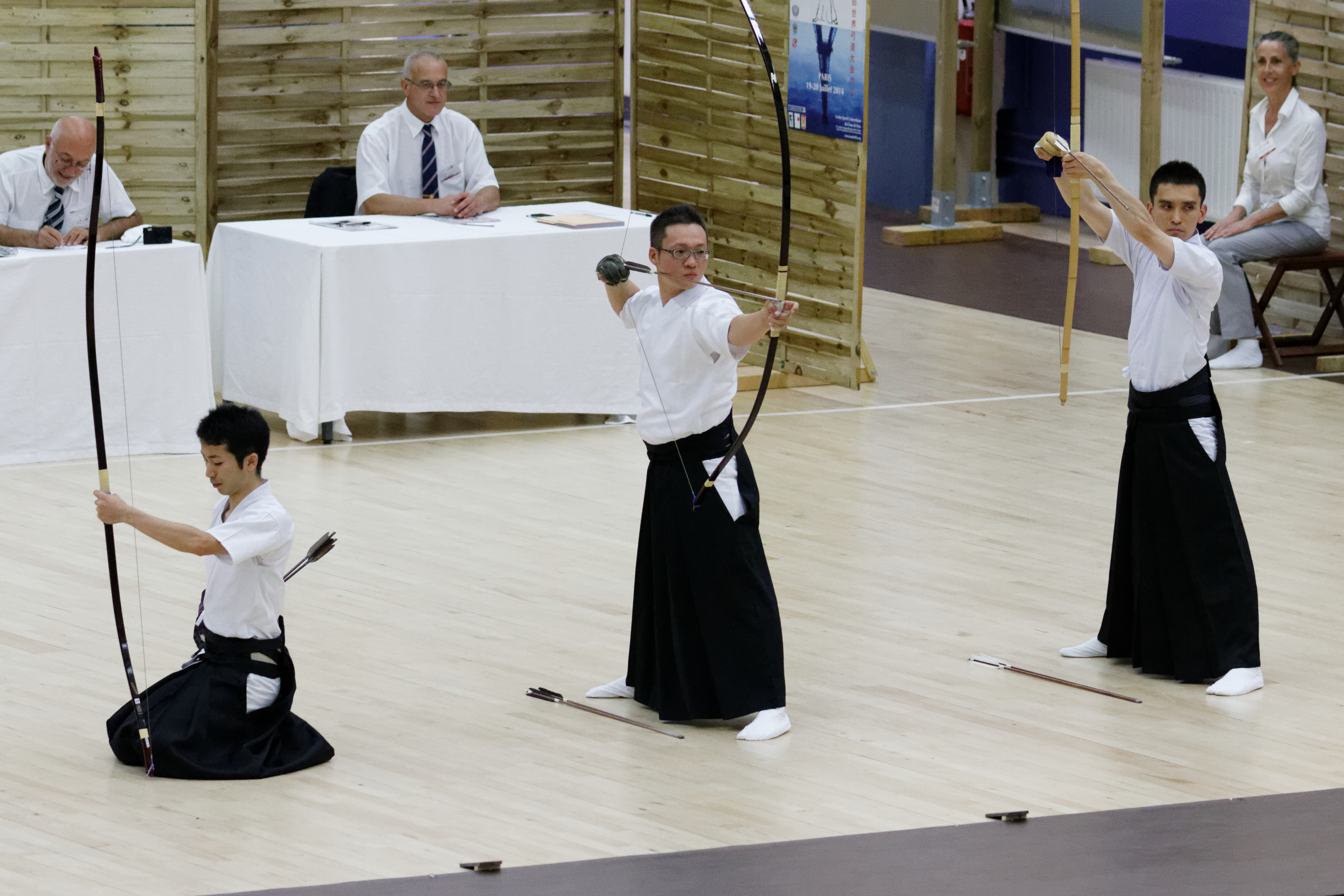
Second 2014 Kyudo World Cup, Paris

While kyūdō is primarily viewed as an avenue toward self-improvement, there are often kyūdō competitions or tournaments whereby archers practise in a competitive style. These tournaments often involve kyūdō practitioners from all ranks and grades, including high school, college and adult participants. Competition is usually held with a great deal more ceremony than the standard dōjō practice. In addition to the hassetsu, the archer must also perform an elaborate entering procedure whereby the archer will join up to four other archers to enter the dōjō, bow to the adjudicators, step up to the back line known as the honza (本坐) and then kneel in a form of sitting known as kiza (跪坐). The archers then bow to the mato in unison, stand, and take three steps forward to the shai (shooting line) and kneel again. The archers then move in lock-step fashion through the hassetsu, each archer standing and shooting one after another at the respective targets, kneeling between each shot, until they have exhausted their supply of arrows (generally four).

In Japanese kyūdō competitions, an archer shoots four arrows in two sets, placing one pair of arrows at his feet and holding the second pair at the ready. One then shoots the haya while clasping the otoya tightly with the last one or two fingers of the gloved hand. The archer then waits until the other archers shoot, then sets the otoya and shoots. Once all the archers have shot, the archer will then pick up the second pair of arrows at the feet and repeat the process, starting with the second flight's haya. During normal competition, this process is done with the archers standing, however, the complete shooting procedure includes having the archer kneel in kiza while waiting between each shot.

For each hit on the mato, the archer is awarded a maru ("circle"; 円) mark. For each miss, the archer is awarded a batsu ("X"; 罰) mark. The goal is to strike the target with all four arrows.

== School clubs ==
Many Japanese high schools and colleges have kyūdō clubs (bukatsu; 部活) in which students gather after regular classes to practise kyūdō. Recently these have begun appearing in junior high schools as well, but it is generally left until high school. In some towns or cities where junior high schools don't have a kyūdō club, a student may wish to enroll in kyūdō lessons outside of school, and to have enough time for practice, opt for a less time-demanding (and usually non-sports related) club at their school.

== Major traditions ==
Mounted archery (Yabusame)

- Takeda-ryū (武田流)
- Ogasawara-ryū (小笠原流)

Foot archery

- Heki-ryū (日置流)
  - Heki-ryū Chikurin-ha (竹林派)
    - Bishū Chikurin-ha (尾州竹林派)
    - Kishū Chikurin-ha (紀州竹林派)
  - Heki-ryū Insai-ha (aka. Heki Tō-ryū) (印西派) (日置当流)
  - Heki-ryū Sekka-ha (雪荷派)
  - Heki-ryū Dōsetsu-ha (道雪派)
- Honda-ryū (本多流)
- Ogasawara-ryū (小笠原流)
- Yamato-ryū (大和流)

== Kyūdō in the west ==
Unlike more common forms of Japanese martial arts (e.g. jūdō, karate), kyūdō is one of the Japanese martial arts that has not seen large amounts of mainstream interest in the West. While kyūdō appeared as early as 1898 in Italy, it has appeared in other western countries only in recent times. Many countries have no kyūdōjō, or only very small groups. Kyūdō is often brought back by westerners returning from Japan, who have studied it there. In some cases, it is supported by Japanese people temporarily living outside Japan. Often practitioners of other martial arts develop an interest in kyūdō.

Kyūdō arrived in America in the early 1900s as members of the Dai Nippon Butoku Kai, first in Hawaii with the Hawaii Kyūdō Kai, and then on the mainland of the U.S. Washington State saw the first group on the mainland, then in San Francisco and San Jose. Next was Los Angeles with a group called the Rafu Kyūdō Kai or Los Angeles Kyūdō Kai ("Rafu" (羅府) was the term the local Japanese used for "Los Angeles"). After Los Angeles, the next group to form was in New York.

When many of the Japanese were interned in camps during World War II, all of the groups (except the Hawaii Kyūdō Kai) disbanded; the Hawaii Kyūdō Kai simply quietly practiced almost in secret.

So, other than the Hawaii Kyūdō Kai, there were no kyūdō groups in America after the war until around 1968, when a small group formed in the basement of a Buddhist church in Los Angeles. The next revival in America was with Koen and Kiomaru Mishima, who practiced with a small group in the basement of a Buddhist church in Los Angeles; they were later joined by Rev. Hirokazu Kosaka. By 1976 (at the request of an original member of the Los Angeles Kyūdō Kai, who belonged to the group in the 1920s), they had renamed their fledgling group 'The Los Angeles Kai'.

Daihonzan Chozen-ji, a Rinzai Zen temple founded in Honolulu in 1972, began kyūdō training in 1979–80, with master Suhara Osho visiting from Japan.

In the 1980s, Kanjuro Shibata XX was invited by Chögyam Trungpa Rinpoche to the Karmê Chöling Tibetan Buddhist monastery in Vermont, where he demonstrated kyūdō for the first time in the United States. This visit and demonstration led to an interest in kyūdō in the Connecticut River Valley, and an active community that has continued until the present.

The official American Kyudo Renmei was founded in 1998, and is the official body recognised by Japan in association with the IKYF for Kyudo in the United States. It is a 501(c)3 non-profit organization dedicated to promoting Japanese archery, kyūdō, in the Americas, and has clubs in nine states, and some connected groups.

There is a growing interest in kyūdō outside Japan, with a number of well-established kyūdōjō practising regularly. The international governing organisation for kyūdō is the International Kyudo Federation (IKYF), based in Japan and founded in 2006. It was formed by the ANKF, gathering practitioners together to form an international body, with the goal to promote the sport internationally, running international seminars and gradings. Initially, it had 17 member countries, and as of 2024 maintains standards for official member national bodies or affiliates in 48 countries.

Many countries in Europe have long established clubs and organisations maintaining Kyudo in those nations, with the European Kyudo Federation as an umbrella organisation overseeing Kyudo in all of Europe.

Several other kyūdō organizations also exist to facilitate the practice of kyūdō, including the Honda-ryū Seikyūkai, Takeda-ryū Yabusame Hozonkai, Kyūbajutsu-Reiho Ogasawara-Kyōjō, Heki-ryū (various ryū-ha), Zen (various ryū-ha), sports yabusame, the (new) Dai Nippon Butoku Kai (hankyū only), the (new) Dai Nippon Kyudo Kai, the Japan Budo International Federation (Serbia), and other independent/non-affiliated kyudo aficionado groups. Many of these organizations are registered in Japan as general incorporated associations (ippan shadan hōjin) or general incorporated foundations (ippan zaidan hōjin), and some also have their own menkyo (rank) systems.

== Gallery ==
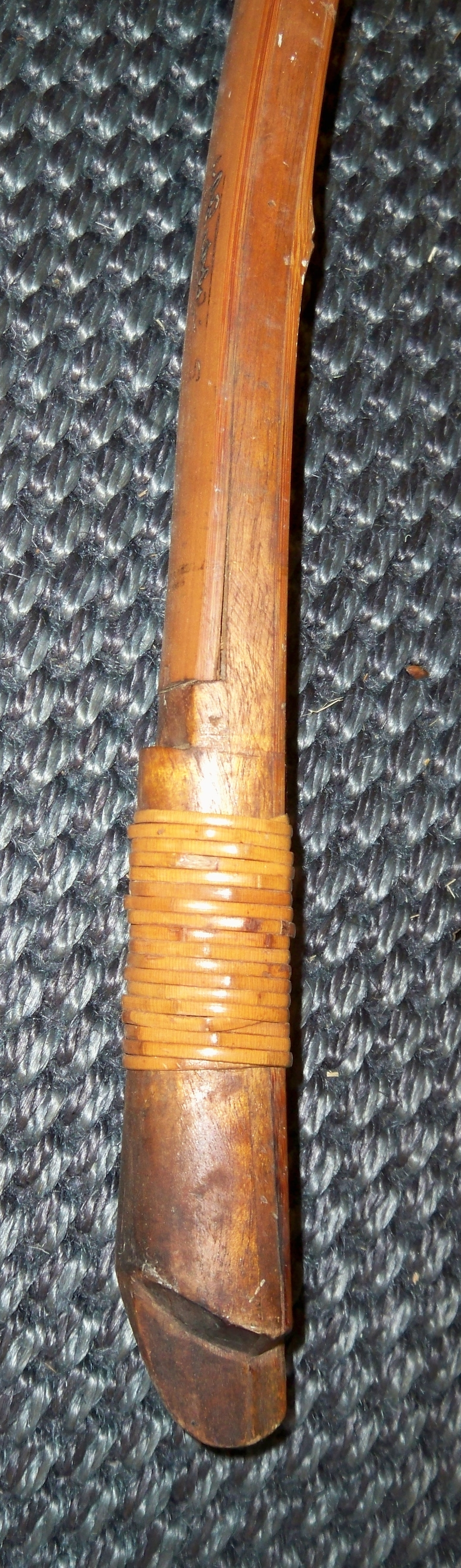
Moto hazu (bottom nock)

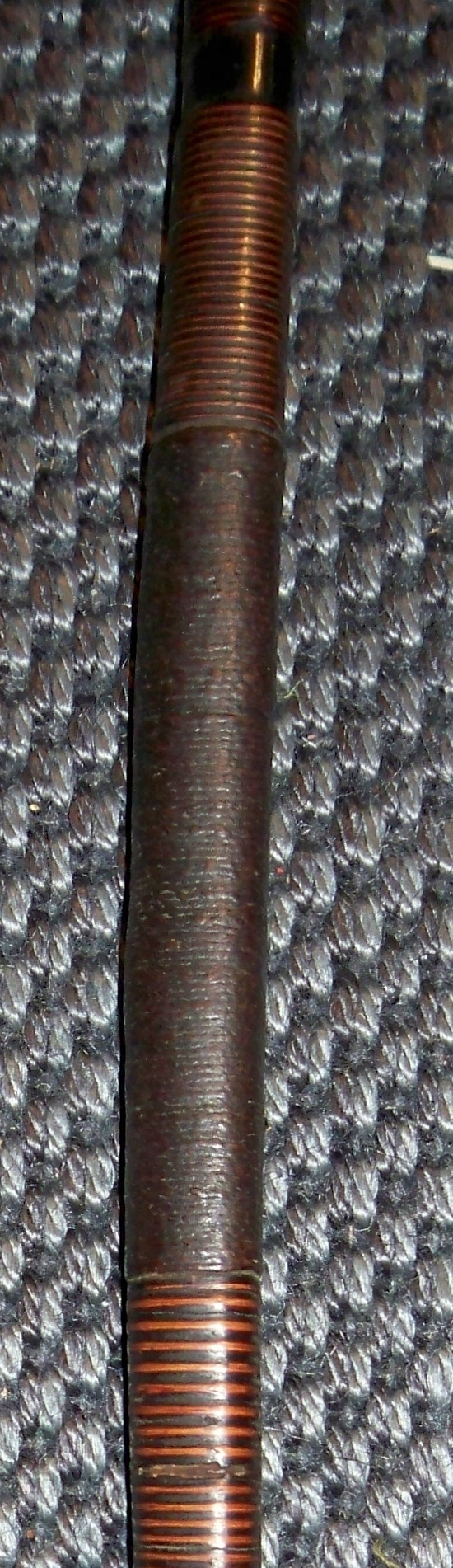
Nigiri (grip)

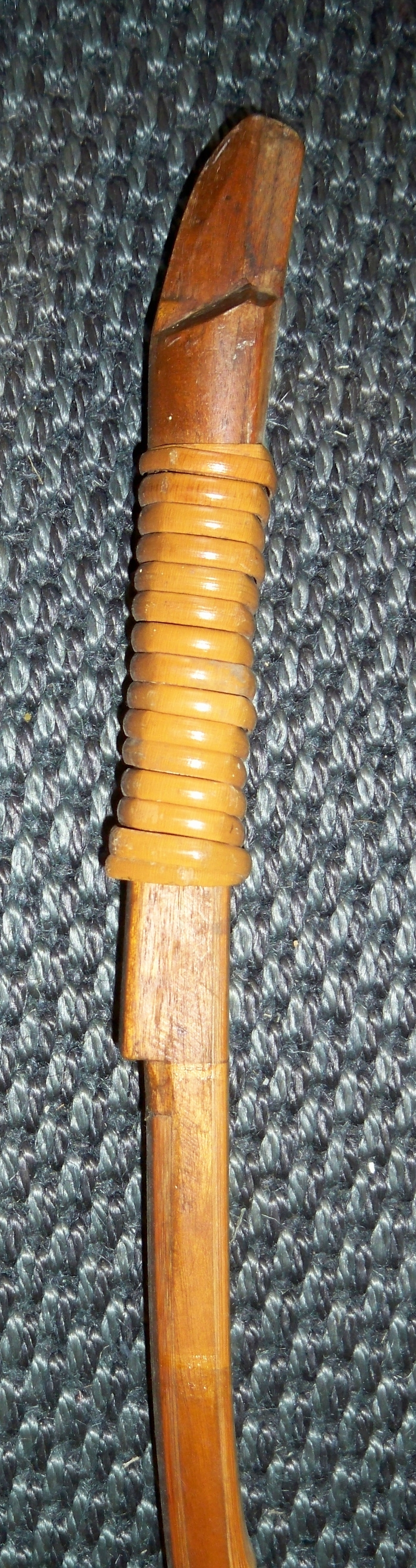
Ura hazu (top nock)

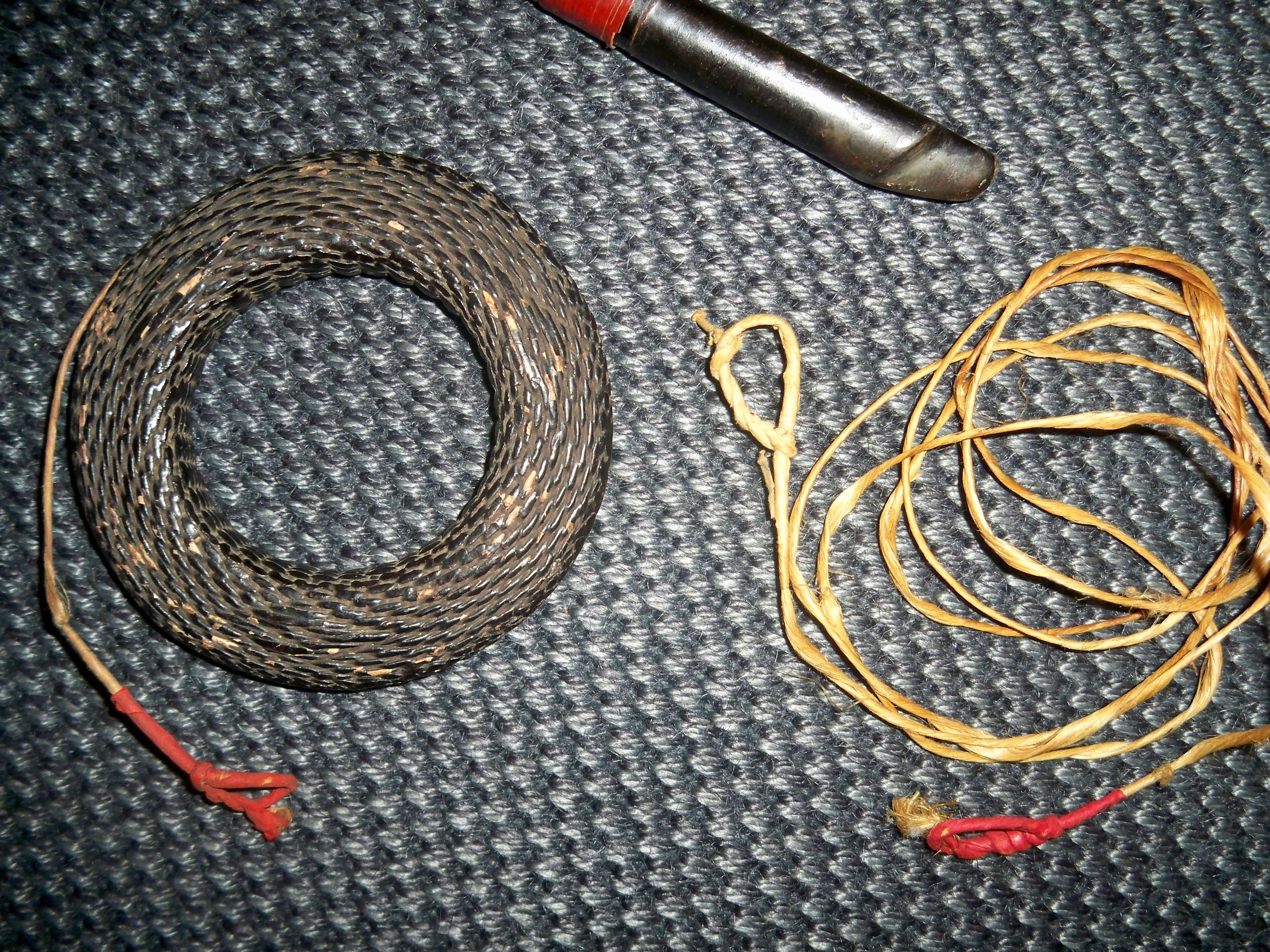
Tsurumaki (string holder) and tsuru (string)

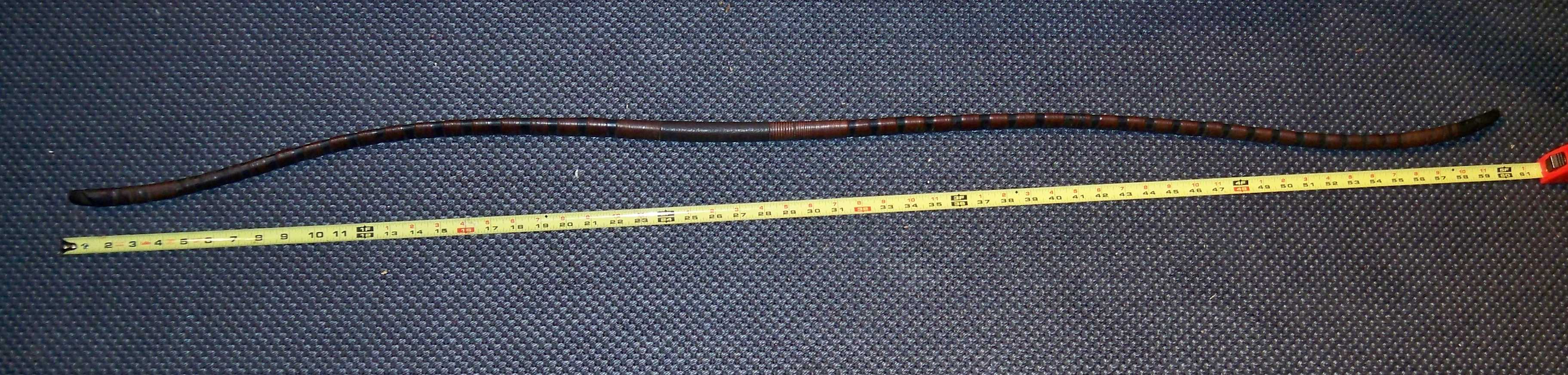
Antique hankyū (small yumi)

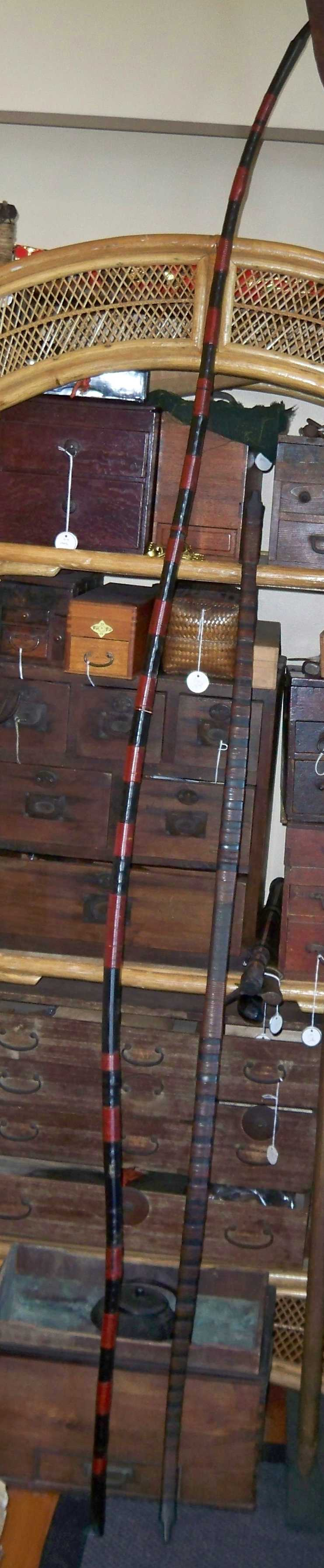
Antique daikyū (large yumi) and hankyū (small yumi)

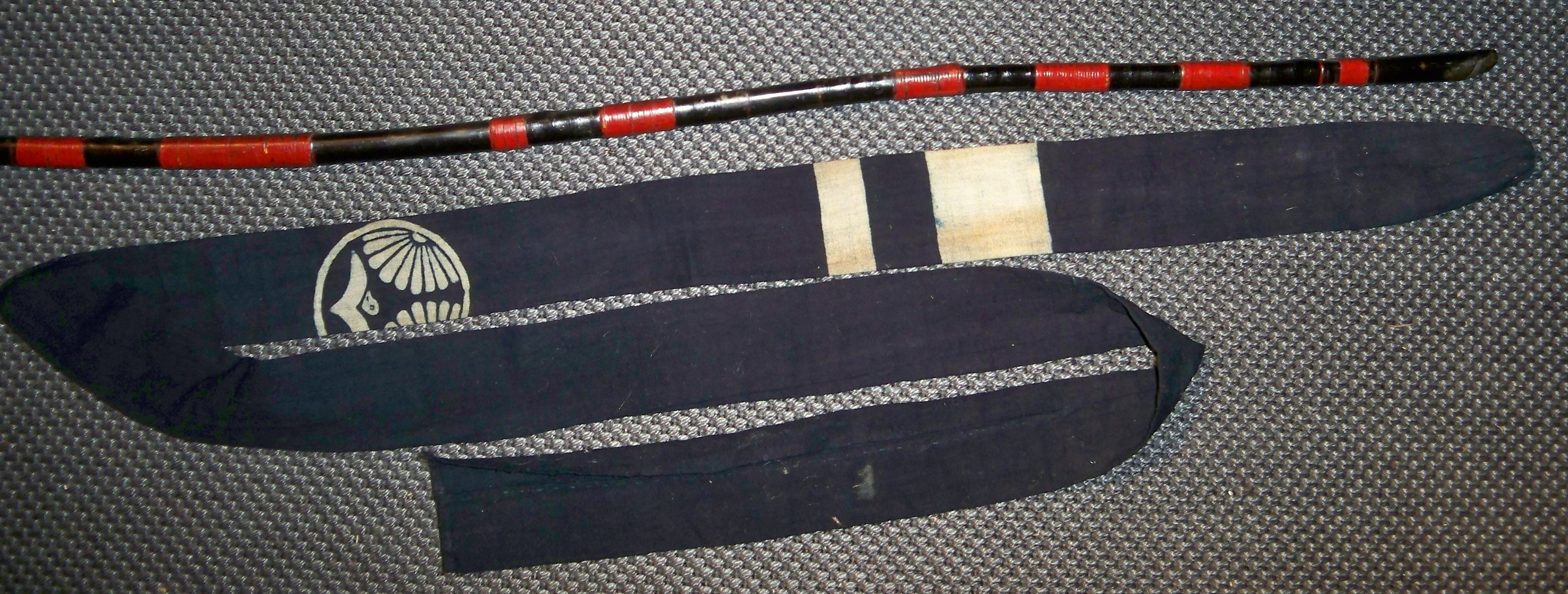
Yumi bukuro (cloth cover)

== See also ==
- Kyūjutsu – Japanese archery technique.
  - Yumi – Traditional Japanese bow.
  - Ya (arrow) – Traditional Japanese arrow.
- Yabusame – Japanese archery involving riding a horse.
- Inuoumono – A Japanese sport that involved mounted archers shooting at dogs. The dogs were released into a circular enclosure approximately 15m across, and mounted archers would fire upon them whilst riding around the perimeter.
- Kasagake – A type of Japanese mounted archery; in contrast to yabusame, the types of targets are various and the archer shoots without stopping the horse. While yabusame has been played as a part of formal ceremonies, kasagake has developed as a game or practice of martial arts, focusing on technical elements of horse archery.
- Tōshiya – The Tōshiya, "passing arrow", or "the arrows which hit the target", was an archery exhibition contest held on the west veranda of Sanjūsangen-dō temple in Kyoto, Japan.
- Shihan Mato – A traditional style of Japanese archery using a short bow from a seated position.
- The Japanese culture and lifestyle television show Begin Japanology aired on NHK World featured a full episode on kyūdō in 2008.
- A European's take on kyūdō in Zen in the Art of Archery.
- Tsurune – A Japanese light novel series about a school kyūdō club, later adapted into an anime in 2018 by Kyoto Animation.
- All Nippon Kyudo Federation - The Main Governing Body for Kyudo in Japan.

== Literature ==
- Herrigel, Eugen (1953). Zen in the Art of Archery. Pantheon.
- Hoff, Feliks (2002). Kyudo: The Way of the Bow (1st ed.). Shambhala Publications. ISBN 1-57062-852-1.
- Kyudo Manual. (1992?) Volume 1. Principles of Shooting (revised ed.). All Nippon Kyudo Federation.
- Triplett, Christoper; Triplett, Katja. "Kyudo - Standing Zen". Archived from the original on 2006-10-25.
- DeProspero, Dan and Jackie (1993). Kyudo: The Essence and Practice of Japanese Archery. Kodansha International. ISBN 4-7700-1734-0.
- Stevens, John (2011). Lo zen, l'arco, la freccia. Edizioni Mediterranee. ISBN 978-88-272-2148-8.
- Accademia Procesi. "1898 The first evidence of Kyudo in Italy". Archived from the original on 2016-12-21.
- Pérez, Belén (2013). La Esencia del Kyudo. El Arte del Tiro con Arco Japonés. Satori Ediciones. ISBN 978-84-941125-5-3.
- Haubner, Johannes (2020). The Power of the Bow - The History of Japanese Archery as Mirrored in Ancient Woodblock Prints. Verlag Angelika Hörnig. ISBN 978-3-938921-75-3.
