= Walker Corporation =

Australian property development company

- Type: Private
- Industry: Property Development
- Founded: 1972
- Founders: Alec Walker; Lang Walker
- Headquarters: Sydney, Australia
- Area served: Australia, United States, Canada, Fiji, Malaysia
- Website: walkercorp.com.au

Walker Corporation is an Australian privately owned property development company.

Most notably, Walker Corporation is responsible for the development and restoration of several significant Australian sites, including King Street Wharf, Finger Wharf, Broadway Shopping Centre and Rhodes Waterside shopping centre in Sydney.

== History ==
Walker Corporation was founded in 1964 by Lang and Alec Walker, initially as an earthmoving and civil engineering business until 1972 when Lang Walker formed The Walker Group and expanded into property development. Walker Corporation was listed on the Australian Securities Exchange in 1994. In 1999, Lang Walker sold his shares in Walker Corporation to Australand (now Frasers Property), reserving the right to reuse the Walker Corporation name after January 2003. Lang Walker exercised that right in 2003, renaming McRoss Developments Pty Ltd to Walker Corporation. In 2006, Walker Corporation sold over A$1.1 billion worth of assets to Mirvac, retaining its industrial and some of its commercial and retail interests.

=== Developments since 2020 ===
In 2011 Walker Corporation began development of Collins Square, then the largest commercial mixed-use development in Australia, with construction completed in 2019.

In 2014 Walker Corporation was selected by the Government of Queensland and Redland City Council as the preferred partner to redevelop Toondah Harbour, a 67-hectare (170-acre) site which the government had declared a Priority Development Area located in Redland City, Queensland. The project was a source of controversy, with parts of the proposed development area covering a Ramsar site. In August 2016 Walker Corporation used a meeting with Federal Minister for the Environment and Energy Josh Frydenberg to lobby for boundary changes to reduce the size of the Ramsar site, described by the company as a matter of “urgent national interest.” The company released revised plans in 2018, reducing the proposed land reclamation area by 12 hectares (30 acres) and reducing the impact on neighbouring Cassim Island. In 2022 the company released the project’s Environmental Impact Statement, which was examined by the Government following public consultation.

In 2015 Walker Corporation released plans for its largest international development Senibong Cove, a 16-hectare (40-acre) development located in Johor Bahru, Malaysia. In 2016 the company's plans for a redevelopment of Adelaide's Festival Plaza were approved by the SA Development Assessment Commission, with revised plans including expansions to the retail component approved in late 2020.

As of October 2021, the company was developing over A$30 billion worth of projects across Australia and Malaysia.

==== Notable projects ====
- Collins Square: Australia’s largest commercial mixed-use development that was completed in 2018, occupying a full Melbourne CBD block.
- Parramatta Square: A $3.2 billion project on a 3-hectare (7.4-acre) site in Parramatta, New South Wales, consisting of four commercial towers, a retail district, and public spaces.
- Riverlea Park: The largest residential development in South Australia’s history, comprising approximately 12,000 homes and expected to take over two decades to complete.
- Maroochydore City Centre: Australia’s largest greenfield CBD located in Maroochydore, Queensland, estimated to take 15-20 years to complete.
- Festival Tower: A $1 billion commercial and retail development and public square in the Adelaide CBD, expected to be completed in late 2023.
- Senibong Cove: A jointly-developed Malaysian masterplanned precinct in close proximity to the Johor-Singapore Causeway, containing over 8,000 homes, a 100-berth marina, and a retail precinct built on over 400 hectares (990 acres) of reclaimed land. Senibong Cove received the South East Asia Property Awards’ ‘Best Villa/Housing Development’ award for multiple consecutive years.
- Kokomo Private Island: A six-star private resort occupying an entire 57-hectare (140-acre) Fijian island, comprising 21 villas and five residences.
- Citiswich Business Park: A $1 billion Ipswich industrial estate covering 350 hectares (860 acres), the largest in Queensland.
- Main Drive Kew: A $400 million residential development on the former Kew Cottages site in the leafy Melbourne suburb of Kew. The project is a joint venture between Walker Corporation and the Victorian Government and has been the subject of several accolades, controversies, allegations, and legal disputes. Construction of stage 1 was completed in 2008 and was followed by several disputes between purchasers, consultants, and developers. The final stage was completed in 2014.

=== Co-founder's death ===
Co-founder Lang Walker died on 27 January 2024, aged 78 years. He was survived by his wife, Suzanne, three children and ten grandchildren.
