= Collins Square =

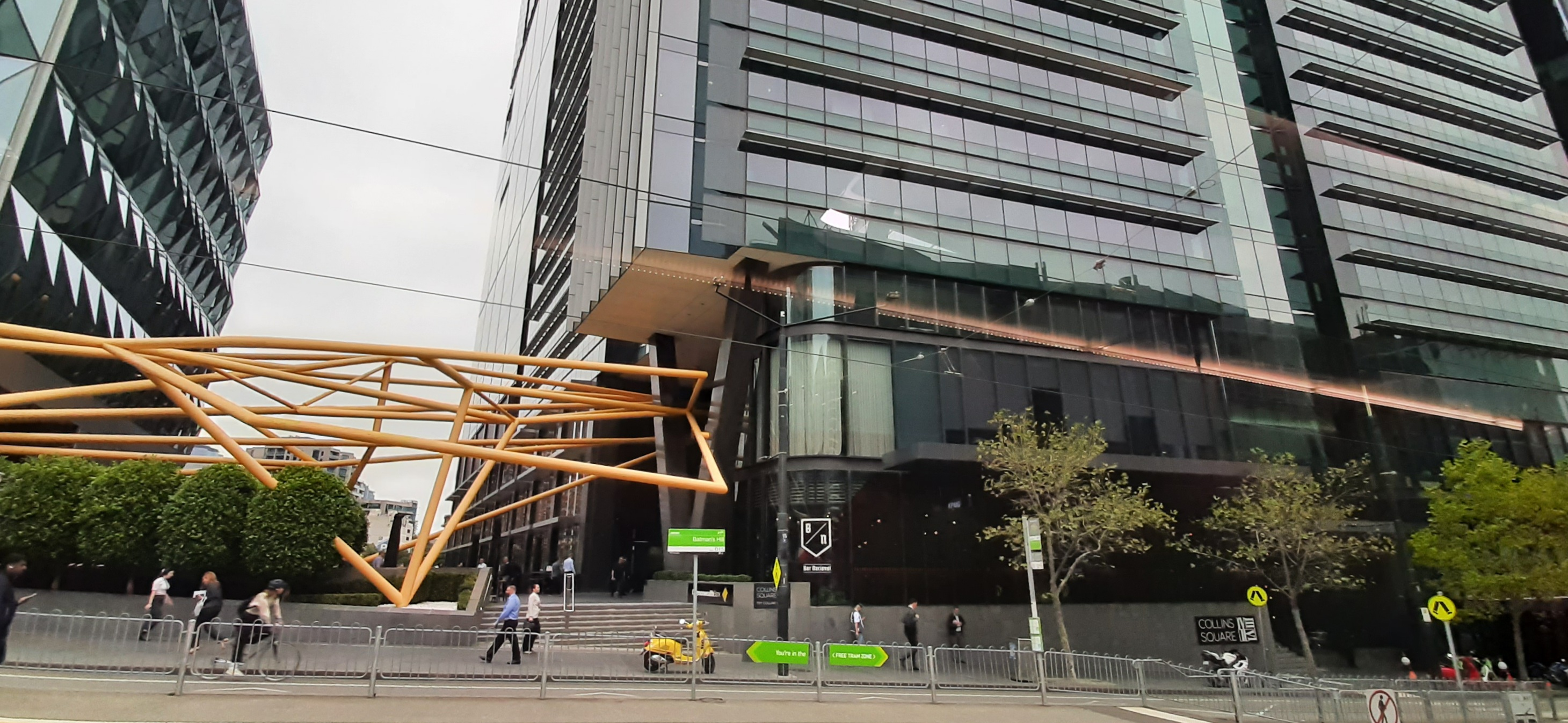
- A 2017 rendering of Collins Square

Project
- Status: Complete
- Developer: Walker Corporation
- Architect: Bates Smart; Buchan; Hassell; Woods Bagot
- Operator: Walker Corporation
- Owner: Walker Corporation; CIMB-Trust Capital Advisors
- Website: www.collinssquare.com.au

Physical features
- Public spaces: Commercial precinct
- Divisions: Melbourne's Docklands
- Streets: Collins Street

Location
- Location in Melbourne
- Coordinates: 37°49′14″S 144°57′01″E
- Country: Australia
- State: Victoria
- City: Melbourne
- Location: Collins Street, Batman's Hill precinct, Melbourne's Docklands
- Address: 717-747 Collins Street, Melbourne

Area
  - Land: 2 ha (4.9 acres)

Collins Square is one of the largest commercial developments in Australia and the largest in the Melbourne central business district of Victoria, covering an area of c. two hectares (five acres).

== Description ==
Located at 717-747 Collins Street, Melbourne in the Batman's Hill precinct in Melbourne's Docklands, Collins Square comprises approximately 260,000 square metres (2,800,000 sq ft) of commercial and retail floor space. The project also includes part of the historic No 2 Goods Shed and Lantern building.

The Collins Square project was developed by Walker Corporation. Walker owns and manages the precinct with the exception of Tower 3, which is owned by CIMB-Trust Capital Advisors. As of October 2018, the project is understood to have had a market value of A$3 billion.

Bates Smart led the design of the Master Plan including the retail podium, and three commercial towers. Buchan provided fine-grain advice on the design of the retail precinct. Hassell designed the third tower, with Woods Bagot designing the final tower. Sissons Architects also provided architectural services to Walker Corporation.

Each of the towers feature artwork by prominent artists; John Olsen was commissioned to paint his 48-square-metre (520 sq ft) 'King Sun' for Tower 1. A large painting by Yannima Tommy Watson features in the lobby of Tower 5.

The first tower was constructed by Built, with Multiplex completing the balance of the project in early 2018. Hutchinson constructed the Lantern Building and refurbished the Goods Shed.

The commercial towers are supported by Cogeneration systems, rainwater harvesting, solar arrays, and regenerative lifts leading to 6 Star NABERS energy ratings.

Collins Square has a number of multi-national companies as tenants; KPMG, AECOM, AUSTRAC, Mercer, Transurban, Grant Thornton, Marsh & McLennan, IWG plc, Pearson Publishing, Pepperstone, BDO Global, Tabcorp, Mott MacDonald the Commonwealth Bank, and the Australian Taxation Office. The 27,000-square-metre (290,000 sq ft) leasing deal with KPMG was touted as the largest leasing transaction in Australia during 2013.
