= International Kyudo Federation =

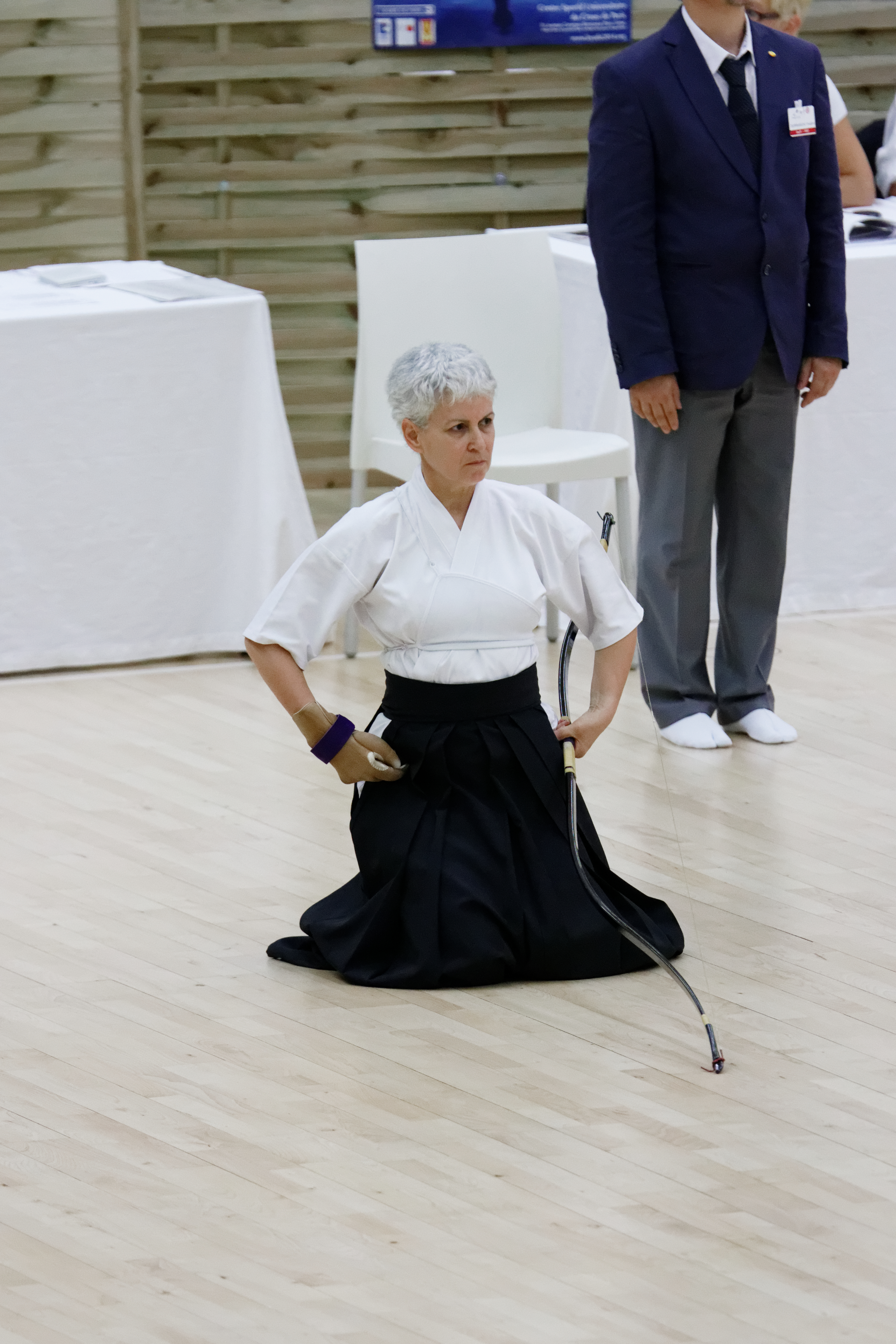
Kyudo practitioner in standard kneeling position (kiza) establishing mindfulness as she pursues the ultimate goal of the Kyudo practitioner, which can be gained when archers shoot correctly (i.e. truthfully) with virtuous spirit and attitudes established through the three main desirable key attributes, (真善美), roughly approximated as "truth-goodness-beauty"; Shin, Zen, Bi.

The International Kyudo Federation (abbreviated as IKYF) is the International body for the Governance of Kyudo Worldwide, establishing standards, grading and competitions throughout the world. The IKYF is a body associated with the All Nippon Kyudo Federation (ANKF) sharing in its role to govern and support Kyudo. While The ANKF governs kyudo within Japan, the IKYF promotes, maintains and educates about kyudo internationally.

== History ==
The IKYF was formed out of the All Nippon Kyudo Federation (ANKF) in May 2006. Unlike other Japanese martial arts, up until the end of the 20th century kyudo had stayed largely in Japan and was active in some countries in Europe. Even so, a couple of these countries, including France, Italy, Germany and The United States had quite a long history of kyudo, with Germany establishing the practice in 1940 and Italy in 1930.

A European Kyudo Federation of 15 member countries was formed initially, and It was then decided in 2006 that an international body needed to be formed to specifically cover the practice of kyudo outside Japan. A number of countries, including the United Kingdom, then became founding members. The organization held its first international competition in 2007.

== Roles ==
Broadly, the ANKF governs Kyudo within Japan, and the IKYF is the connected body governing Kyudo outside Japan. Both work together for the conduct and promotion of Kyudo.

The broad role of the IKYF are to oversee the conduct of kyūdō outside Japan. This includes 7 main responsibilities:

- International promotion of the martial art
- Supporting the formation of international branches
- Establishing rules for Competitions
- Organizing and conducting International Competitions (Taikai)
- Organizing training workshops.
- Disseminating information about Kyudo internationally
- The conduct of shinsa(examination) for its overseas based practitioners.

== The Organizational Structure ==
The organization headquarters are in Tokyo, Japan. Princess Hisako Takamado is Honorary President of the organization, and a Kyudo practitioner.

There are also sub organizations involved in organizing Kyudo to a lesser degree; one in Europe and a South East Asian umbrella organization of eight countries.

== International Gradings ==
The IKYF organizes three annual shinsa for International member countries. One is conducted within North America, for kyudo practitioners based in the Americas. The IKYF importantly keeps the International competitions unified and conducted with the same rules.

== International Taikai ==
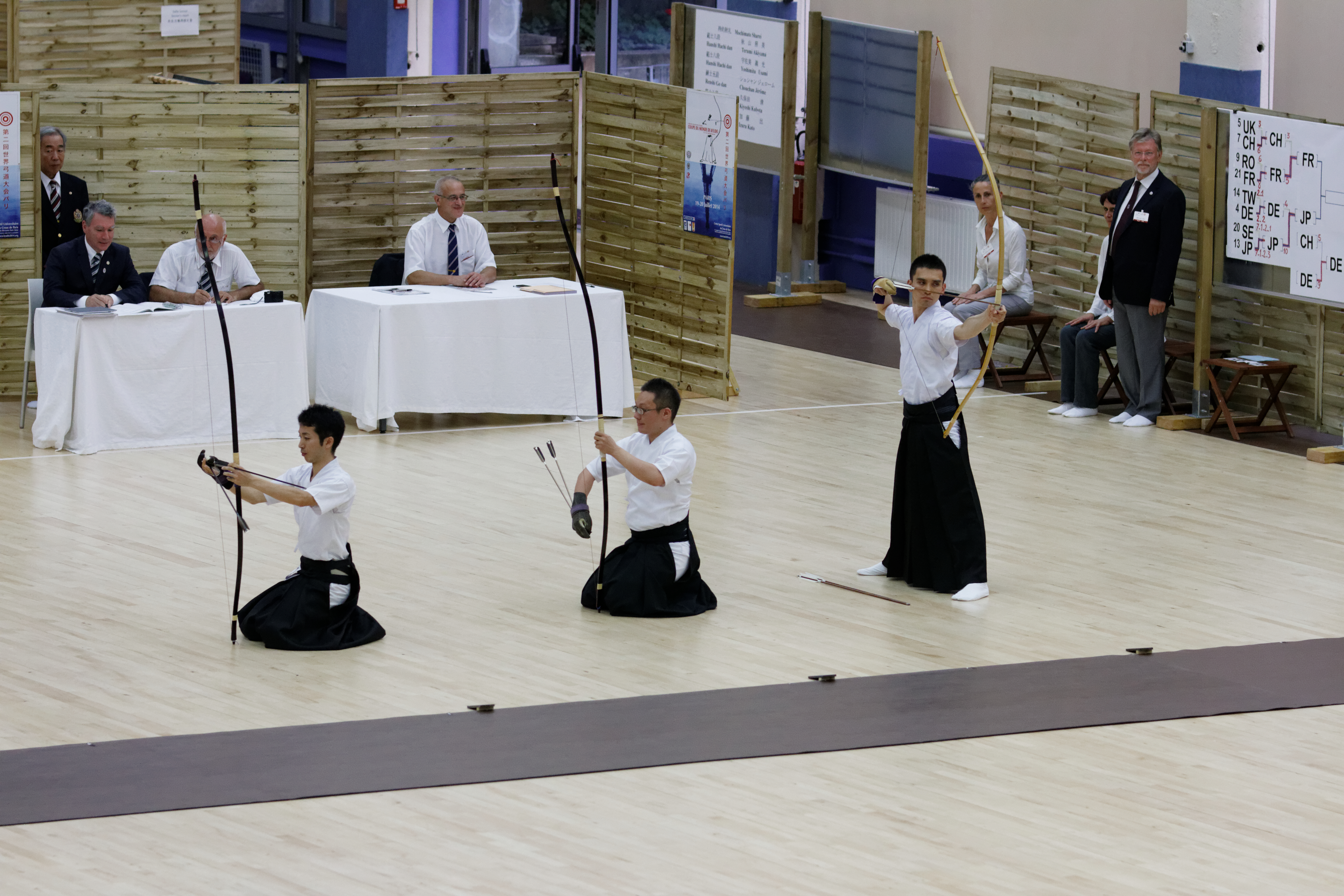
2014 World Taikai. Judges/officiators sit behind tables judging the practitioners form, etiquette and accuracy.

The first international competition was held in 2007. The First World Takai was first held in 2010, and then held every four years after that, either in Japan, or in a city of a member country.

- The First World Takai was held in Tokyo in 2010
- The Second World Taikai was held in Paris in 2014
- The Third World Taikai was held in Tokyo in 2018
- The Fourth World Taikai was held in Tokyo in 2022

== Member countries ==
There are two levels of membership for country level clubs. National associations wishing to join first apply to the IKYF and become affiliate members. This is the status of new national associations, that they are granted while the clubs are forming and the national bodies are establishing themselves and growing. After the National bodies have established themselves, and meet certain criteria, they then apply for full membership. It may take some years for a national body to be a full member countries can join then gradings within Japan.

There are currently 32 member nations, some of which include The United States, Canada, many European countries, Australia, and Taiwan. South Africa is the only African country so far. There are also 16 initiate member countries recognized as having clubs active by the IKYF, but who have not yet become official Member Nations.
