= Eugen Herrigel =

German philosopher

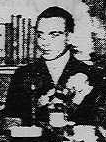
Eugen Herrigel

Eugen Herrigel (German: [ˈhɛʁɪɡl̩]; 20 March 1884 – 18 April 1955) was a German philosopher, born in Lichtenau. He taught philosophy at Tohoku Imperial University in Sendai, Japan, from 1924 to 1929 and introduced Zen to large parts of Europe through his writings.

== Career ==
While living in Japan from 1924 to 1929, he was taught kyūdō, traditional Japanese archery, by Awa Kenzō (阿波研造, 1880–1939), a master of archery and founder of his own religion known as "The Great Doctrine of the Way of Shooting". Herrigel allegedly learned archery in the hope of better understanding Zen. Although Herrigel claimed to have studied archery for six years, he was only in Japan for slightly more than five years and probably only studied archery for three of those years.

In July 1929 he returned to Germany and was given a professorship in philosophy at the University of Erlangen.

In a letter to the magazine Encounter, Gershom Scholem writes: "Herrigel joined the Nazi Party after the outbreak of the war and some of his former friends in Frankfurt, who broke with him over this issue, told me about his career as a convinced Nazi, when I enquired about him in 1946." He also states in the same letter that he thinks this fact is evidence for the claim made by Arthur Koestler in the same magazine that Zen can be used to justify the politics of the Nazi party.

Eugen Herrigel was an active member of the Nazi organization Militant League for German Culture.

== Writings ==
In 1936, he published a 20-page article describing his experiences entitled "Die Ritterliche Kunst des Bogenschiessens" (The Knightly Art of Archery) in the journal, Zeitschrift für Japanologie. This later formed the basis of his most famous work Zen in the Art of Archery (1948), which is perhaps one of the most influential works ever written on Zen in a European language.

Herrigel died in 1955 in Partenkirchen. Among his papers were found voluminous notes on various aspects of Zen. These notes were selected and edited by Hermann Tausend in collaboration with Gusty L. Herrigel, the author's wife (who studied Japanese flower arranging) and were published in German with the title Der Zen-Weg (The Zen-Way). This version was revised and edited by Alan Watts in 1960 and published by Vintage Press as The Method Of Zen.

== Dispute ==
Yamada Shōji has demonstrated that Herrigel's teacher, Awa Kenzō, never practiced Zen or even studied with a Zen master. While John Stevens has reproduced a photograph of a calligraphy by Awa that reads "The Bow and Zen are One.", Yamada quotes Awa's biographer Sakurai Yasunosuke, who wrote "While Kenzō used the phrase 'the bow and Zen are one' and used philosophical language of Mahāyāna Buddhism in particular to describe shadō, he did not approve of Zen unconditionally." Rather, Kenzō emphasized establishing his own religion of archery and claimed he was doing missionary work in promoting it. Herrigel either intentionally or inadvertently misinterpreted Awa's teachings as an expression of Zen.

Herrigel himself never really learned the Japanese language and instead relied on interpreters, who have since confessed that they seldom understood Awa's cryptic phrases. Much of Herrigel's understanding of Zen seems to have derived from the writings of D.T. Suzuki, the great lay popularizer of Zen Buddhism in the West. Suzuki himself seems to have agreed initially with Herrigel's analysis, having written the introduction to an edition of Zen in the Art of Archery, but he wrote later that "Herrigel is trying to get to Zen, but he hasn't grasped Zen itself". Stevens, in his biography and compilation of Kenzō's writings, dismisses these objections : 'More preposterous is the argument that Kenzo’s understanding of Zen was faulty because, it seems, Kenzo never did formal meditation or was certified by a Zen teacher. This is a gross misunderstanding of what Zen is meant to be.'

Volker Zotz revealed in his book, Auf den glückseligen Inseln, concerning Buddhism and German culture, that Eugen Herrigel was a strong advocate of the Nazi party. For his involvement with Nazism he was forbidden to teach at the University for three years after 1945.
