= Zen in the Art of Archery =

1948 book by Eugen Herrige

- Author: Eugen Herrigel
- Language: German
- Genre: Philosophy
- Published: Curt Weller, Konstanz; Pantheon Books, NY; Routledge and Kegan Paul, London
- Publication date: 1948 (Germany), 1953 (United States, United Kingdom), 1955 (Japan)
- Publication place: Germany
- Media type: Print (hardcover)
- Pages: 92 pp (1948 German edition); 109 pp (1953 US edition); 107 pp (1953 UK edition)
- OCLC: 40962313

Zen in the Art of Archery (Zen in der Kunst des Bogenschießens) is a book by German philosophy professor Eugen Herrigel, published in 1948, about his experiences studying Kyūdō, a form of Japanese archery, when he lived in Japan in the 1920s. It is credited with introducing Zen to Western audiences in the late 1940s and 1950s.

== Origin ==
Herrigel (1884–1955) was a German professor of philosophy, with a special interest in mysticism. From 1924 to 1929 he taught philosophy in Japan, and studied Kyūdō (the art of the Japanese bow) under a master named Awa Kenzô. Awa taught kyūdō in a way that was regarded by some as a mystical religion, called Daishadokyo. Daishadokyo was an approach to kyūdō that placed great emphasis on the spiritual aspect and differed from much of the mainstream practice at the time. In 1936, Herrigel wrote a 20-page essay about his experiences, and then in 1948 expanded the essay into a short book. The book was translated into English in 1953 and Japanese in 1955.

== Book ==
The book sets forth theories about motor learning. Herrigel has an accepting spirit towards unconscious control of outer activity that Westerners heretofore considered to be wholly under conscious control. For example, a central idea in the book is how, through years of practice, a physical activity becomes effortless both mentally and physically, as if our physical memory (known today as "muscle memory") executes complex and difficult movements without conscious control from the mind.

Herrigel describes Zen in archery as follows:

(...) The archer ceases to be conscious of himself as the one who is engaged in hitting the bull's-eye which confronts him. This state of unconscious is realized only when, completely empty and rid of the self, he becomes one with the perfecting of his technical skill, though there is in it something of a quite different order which cannot be attained by any progressive study of the art (...)

== Influence ==
Herrigel's book may have inspired Tim Gallwey's 1974 book The Inner Game of Tennis. Both Herrigel and Gallwey approach sport and life as opportunities for learning inner cooperation. Zen in the Art of Archery also relates to the "inner child" idea in humanistic psychology. Later literature either discusses balancing the "inner game" and the "outer game" or counseling approaches to accessing, communicating and collaborating with the inner child beyond sports.

The title "Zen in the Art of Archery" most likely inspired the titles of many other works, either directly or indirectly. Foremost among these is Robert Pirsig's 1974 book Zen and the Art of Motorcycle Maintenance. More than 200 works have been created with similar titles, including Ray Bradbury's 1990 book Zen in the Art of Writing, as well as Zen and the Art of Poker, Zen and the Art of Knitting, Crazy Legs Conti: Zen and the Art of Competitive Eating, and so on.

J. D. Salinger's fictional character Seymour Glass applied one aspect of Zen archery—aiming by deliberately not taking aim—to playing the children's game of marbles.

The wider theme of many of these works is that a regular routine can have a spiritual dimension.

== Criticism ==
Both Arthur Koestler and Gershom Scholem accused Herrigel's book of being influenced by and justifying the politics of the Nazi party on the pages of Encounter magazine. Scholem also accuses Herrigel's widow of editing his writing and hiding the fact that he was an active member of the Nazi party and the Nazi organization the Militant League for German Culture.

Others, such as Shoji Yamada in his book Shots in the Dark, claim that many of the conversations between Herrigel and Awa Kenzo were altered or completely fabricated by the author.
