= All Nippon Kyudo Federation =

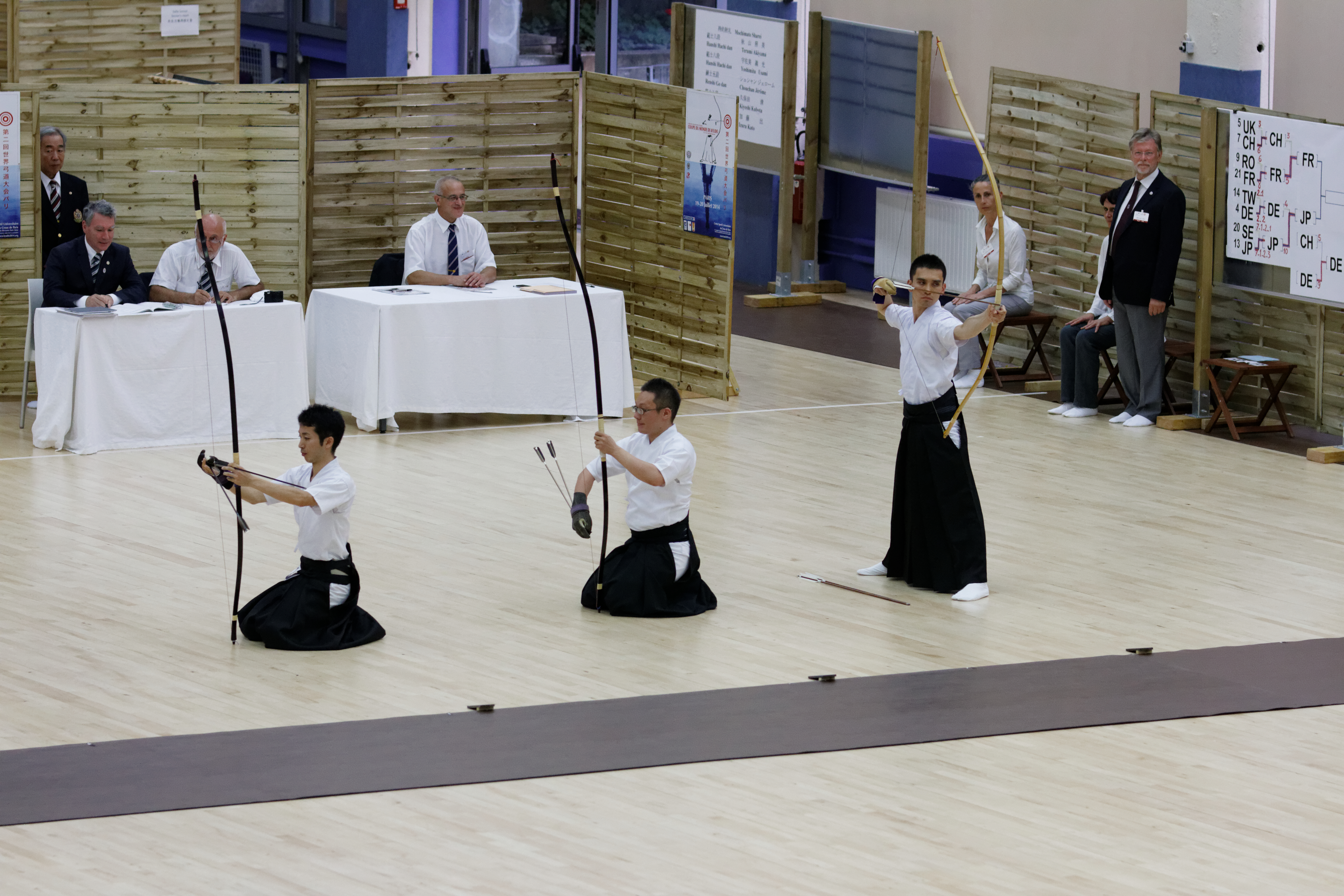
Kyudo World Cup - International Competition, 2014

The All Nippon Kyudo Federation (ANKF) (Japanese: 全日本弓道連盟) (全弓連) is a public interest incorporated foundation and sports governing body that presides over the martial art of Kyūdō in Japan by organising standards seminars and events for the majority of kyudo practitioners in the country.

Until 1968, it was a member of the International Archery Federation (FITA), but due to cost issues, at the end of 1968, it transferred its FITA membership rights to the All Japan Archery Federation.

== History ==
Following the end of World War II, the All Nippon Kyudo Federation formed in 1949. Up until that point, there had been a ban on martial arts under Japan by the Allied occupation forces, and the ANKF worked to get public kyudo practice restarted. As part of this, one of its initial goals was to produce a manual to establish a standardised style. This manual, The Kyudo Kyohon, includes various forms, techniques, terminology and even details on how to conduct a tournament.

The ANKF standardised the basic etiquette and shooting technique for kyudo after the war, drawing on a number of different styles, including the Ogasawara-ryū, Heki-ryū, and Honda-ry ū. The idea was that these standardised shooting forms could be practiced by anyone, so there wouldn't be any more big disputes between the practitioners. There are two options for raising the yumi before drawing, the raising along the centerline of the body (shо̄men uchiokoshi) and raising diagonally off to the side (shamen uchiokoshi).

=== The Kyuhon ===
The Kyuhon manual itself was first published 1953. The document was translated by Liam Kennedy, a Kyudo practitioner from the UK, and then published in 1971. A revised edition was then published in 1994. The book covers the basic postures, movements as well as the core shooting form that is referred to as shahо̄ hassetsu (the eight stages of shooting). Over 500 photos were taken to be incorporated into the manual, with personal oversight by the ANKF president Chiba Tanetsugu. He in particular took interest in overseeing the production of the manual.

== Organisation structure/governance ==
The purpose of the ANKF's founding was to "promote kyudo and foster the improvement of the physical strength of the Japanese citizenry and cultivate a spirit of sportsmanship, thereby contributing to the development of society and culture." Its operations were outlined as the following six items.

- The establishment of general policies for the popularization and promotion of kyudo.
- The hosting of national and international competitions.
- To run assessments for Shо̄gо̄ (titles) and examinations for Dan (ranks).
- To conduct surveys, research, and hold seminars, etc.
- The publication of an institutional magazine and other materials.
- Other business necessary to achieve the purpose of the preceding articles.

The monthly magazine "Kyudo" is currently being published as the institutional magazine of the ANKF.

=== Membership ===
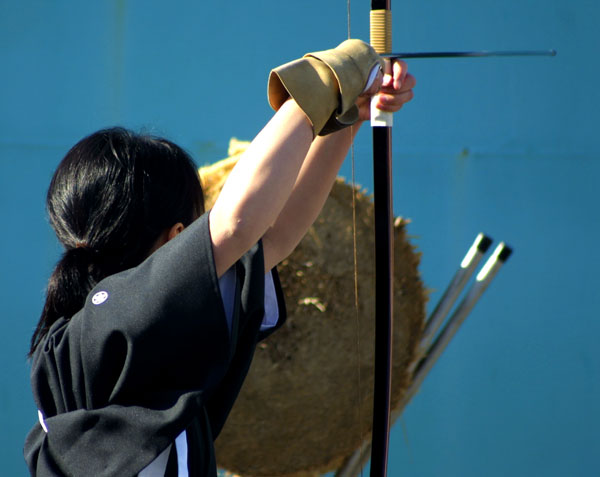
Kyudo practitioner

There are 47 affiliated federations in the prefectures of Japan. Tokyo's federation is split into three parts, known as the Dai-Ichi, Dai-Ni, and Dai-San Districts. Similarly, Hokkaido's federation is split into 6 parts, known as the Chūо̄ (Central), Seibu (Western), Nanbu (Southern), Tobu (Eastern), Chubu (Midland), and Hokubu (Northern) Districts. All other parts of Japan have one regional federation per prefecture.

As of March 31, 2021, the number of members is 135,660, of which 67 people hold the title of Hanshi, 1,942 people hold the title of Kyо̄shi, and 4,691 people hold the title of Renshi.

Additionally, although the ANKF has de facto control of most domestic archery competitions, there are also schools and practitioners who are active without affiliation with the ANKF. Furthermore, there also exists the All Nippon University Kyudo Federation, which is an organization for university student competitions that is independent of the ANKF.

The ANKF is also affiliated with the Japanese Martial Arts Council.

=== IKYF ===
see main article International Kyudo Federation

The International Kyudo Federation is a body associated with the ANKF, sharing in its role to govern and support Kyudo. While The ANKF governs kyudo within Japan, the IKYF promotes, maintains and educates kyudo internationally since 2006.
