= Ogasawara =

Ogasawara (written: 小笠原) is a Japanese surname. It may also refer to:

== Locations ==
- Ogasawara Islands, also known as the Bonin Islands, an archipelago of over 30 islands about 1000 km south of Tokyo, Japan
- Ogasawara National Park, an island national park located on that archipelago
- Ogasawara Subprefecture, a subprefecture of Tokyo, Japan
- Ogasawara, Tokyo, a village in Ogasawara Subprefecture, Tokyo, Japan, that governs the Bonin Islands

== People with the surname ==
- Arisa Ogasawara (小笠原 亜里沙, born 1980), a Japanese voice actress
- Atsushi Ogasawara (小笠原 篤, born 1976), a Japanese anime director from Chiba, Japan
- Ayumi Ogasawara (小笠原 歩, born 1978), a Japanese Olympic Curler
- Michihiro Ogasawara (小笠原 道大, born 1973), a Japanese baseball player
- Miki Ogasawara (小笠原 幹, born 1974), Japanese speed skater
- Mitsuo Ogasawara (小笠原 満男, born 1979), a Japanese football (soccer) player
- Shinnosuke Ogasawara (小笠原 慎之介, born 1997), Japanese baseball player
- Tsuneo Ogasawara (小笠原 恒夫, born 1942), Japanese rower

=== Fictional ===
- Sachiko Ogasawara (小笠原 祥子), a fictional main character in the Maria-sama ga Miteru media series
- Haruka Ogasawara (小笠原 晴香), a character from Hibike! Euphonium

=== Historical ===
- Ogasawara clan (小笠原氏), a Japanese samurai clan
- Ogasawara Nagakiyo (小笠原 長清, 1162–1242), a Japanese retainer of the Minamoto clan during the Heian period
- Ogasawara Nagakuni (小笠原 長国, 1824–1877), the 6th and final daimyō of Karatsu Domain in Hizen Province, Kyūshū, Japan
- Ogasawara Nagamichi (小笠原 長行, 1822–1891), a Japanese samurai and official in the Bakumatsu period Tokugawa Shogunate
- Ogasawara Naganari (小笠原 長生, 1867–1958), an Admiral and naval strategist in the Imperial Japanese Navy in Meiji and Taishō period Japan
- Ogasawara Nagashige (小笠原 長重, 1650–1732), a Japanese daimyo of the mid-Edo period
- Ogasawara Nagatoki (小笠原 長時, 1519–1583), a Japanese daimyo of Shinano Province during the Sengoku Period
- Ogasawara Nagatsune (小笠原 長経, 1179–1247), the eldest son of Ogasawara Nagakiyo
- Ogasawara Tadanobu (小笠原 忠忱, 1862–1897), a Japanese daimyo of the late Edo period who ruled the Kokura Domain
- Ogasawara Tadazane (小笠原 忠真, 1596–1667), Japanese daimyo of the early Edo Period

== Other ==
- 10169 Ogasawara, a Main-belt Asteroid discovered on February 21, 1995
- Ogasawara High School, a public high school on Chichi-jima in Ogasawara, Tokyo, Japan

== See also ==
- Izu–Ogasawara Trench
- Ogasawara Whale Watching Association
