= Ogasawara Heibei Tsuneharu =

Japanese archer

Ogasawara Heibei Tsuneharu (1666–1747) was a Japanese archer responsible for resurrecting the Ogasawara School of Archery during the Tokugawa period.

The Ogasawara School (ryu) was founded in the Kamakura period by Tsuneharu's ancestor, Ogasawara Nagakiyo, and specialised in ceremonial archery. However, its teachings were largely lost by the sixteenth century due to numerous schisms in the Ogasawara family. In 1724, the shōgun Tokugawa Yoshimune ordered Tsuneharu to revive the lost school. In doing so, Ogasawara Tsuneharu became the founder of the modern Ogasawara School, which focuses on ceremonial and ritual archery rather than military practices.

== See also ==
- Ogasawara clan
