= Ashikaga Ujinohime =

6th Kōga Kubō of the Ashikaga shogunate

Ashikaga Ujinohime 足利 氏姫

Koga Kubō(de facto)
- In office 1583–1590
- Preceded by: Ashikaga Yoshiuji

Castellan of Kōnosu Palace (Kitsuregawa clan)
- In office 1590–1620

Personal details
- Spouse(s): Ashikaga Kunitomo; Ashikaga Yoriuji
- Parents: Ashikaga Yoshiuji (father); Jōkō-in (mother)
- Relatives: Hōjō Ujiyasu (grandfather); Lady Hayakawa (aunt); Hōjō Ujimasa (uncle); Hōjō Ujiteru (uncle); Hōjō Ujikuni (uncle); Hōjō Ujinori (uncle)

Military service
- Allegiance: Ashikaga shogunate Toyotomi clan Kitsuregawa clan
- Unit: Koga Kubō

Ashikaga Ujihime (足利 氏姫, 1574 – June 6, 1620), or Ashikaga no Ujihime, Ashikaga Ujinohime was the de facto Koga kubō in Sengoku period. She was the daughter of 5th Koga kubō Ashikaga Yoshiuji and Jōkō-in (a daughter of Hōjō Ujiyasu). She was a woman trained in martial arts and received education from the highest court. In 1583 when Yoshiuji died without a male heir, Ujihime succeeded her father at the early age of nine, she took the title Koga kubō (title equivalent to shōgun in Kantō region) and inherited an area equivalent the Koga domain.

== Life ==
She was de facto the Koga Kubo and the castellan in Koga Castle. Even the Ashikaga shogunate lost its sovereignty, Ujinohime was vital to the administration of the Kantō region, she worked together with the Later Hōjō clan and had her lands protected by her uncle Hōjō Ujimasa.

In 1590, Toyotomi Hideyoshi initiated a campaign to eliminate the Hōjō clan, the last obstacle for Japan to be unified under the name of Hideyoshi. The Toyotomi clan won the siege of Odawara and the Hōjō clan was banished. Ujimasa was ordered to commit seppuku along with his brother Hōjō Ujiteru. The area was awarded to Tokugawa Ieyasu after the defeat of the Hōjō at the siege of Odawara.

After this in the same year, Ujinohime was moved to Kōnosu Palace in currently Ibaraki Prefecture and she became the owner of the palace. In 1591 Toyotomi Hideyoshi ordered her married to Ashikaga Kunitomo. When Kunitomo died in 1593, she was then married to his younger brother Ashikaga Yoriuji (Later known as Kitsuregawa Yoriuji) and give birth to a son. The marriage between Ujinohime and Yoriuji began the formation of a new clan, the Kitsuregawa clan. Yoriuji received a new domain, but Ujinohime declined to change domain. So she continued commanding the Konosu palace and Yoriuji went to another castle.

She and Yoriuji ran the Kitsuregawa clan until the day of her death on June 6, 1620. The clan Ujinohime founded prospered for years and became a fudai daimyo in the Edo period.

After her death, her son Ashikaga Yoshichika remained at Kōnosu until his death in 1627. His son, Sonshin, continued to live there until inheriting the Kitsuregawa domain upon the death of his grandfather, Yoriuji, in 1630. Following Sonshin's relocation, the family line fully shifted its residence to Kitsuregawa. The Tokugawa shogunate then confiscated the remaining 300 koku surrounding the Kōnosu Gosho, converting the area into shogunal land before later incorporating it into the Koga domain.

Ashikaga Ujihime's life marked a period of institutional shift for the lineage. As the last head of the Koga Kubō, she oversaw the end of her family's political independence and their union with the Oyumi branch. By remaining at Kōnosu, she preserved the Ashikaga presence in the Kantō region under Tokugawa rule, maintaining the family's status as a surviving branch of the lineage founded by Ashikaga Takauji.

== See also ==
- List of female castellans in Japan
