= Ogasawara clan castle sites =

- 小笠原氏城跡
- Matsumoto, Nagano, Japan
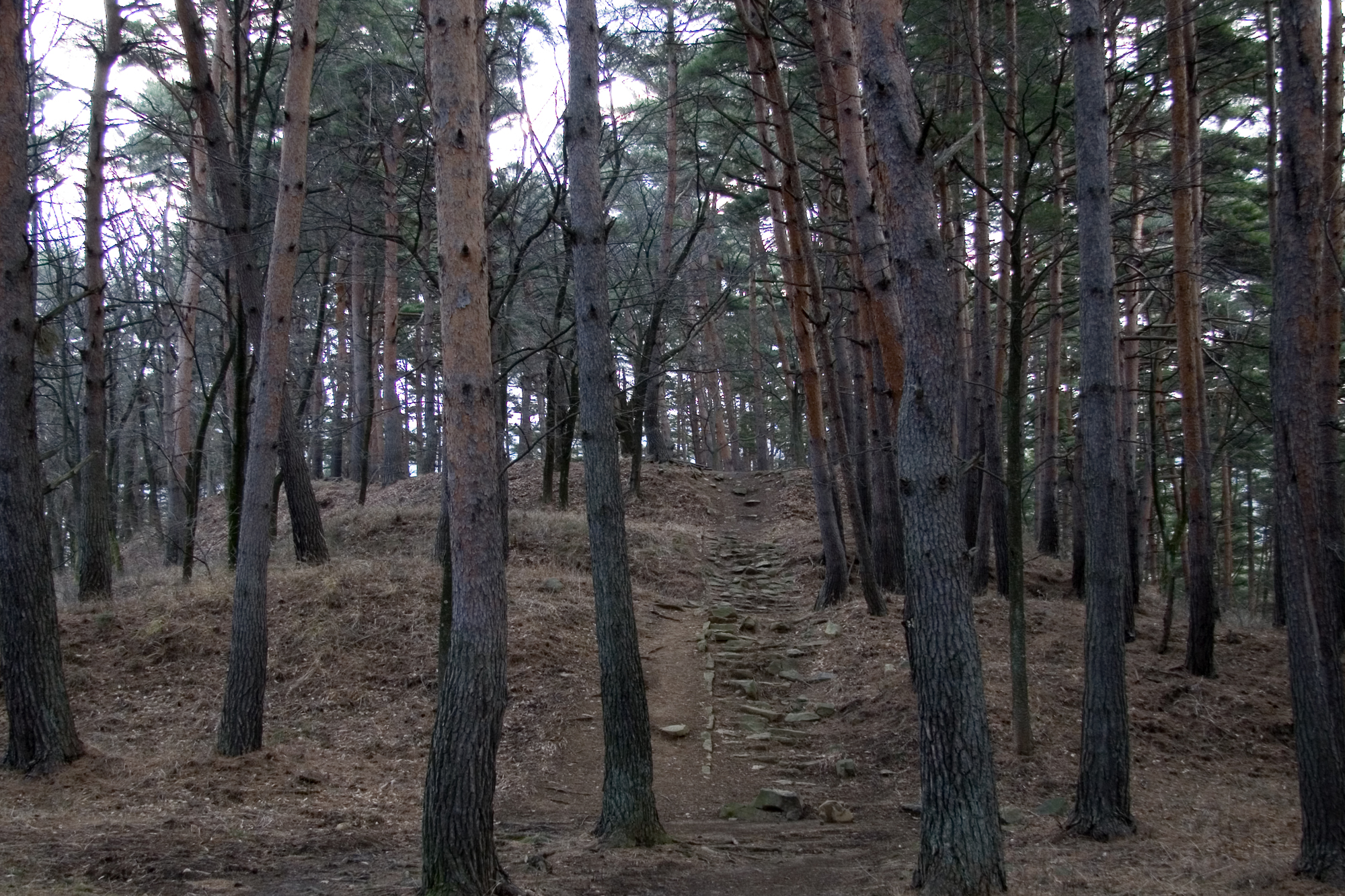
- Site of Hayashi Castle

Site information
- Type: yamashiro-style Japanese castles
- Controlled by: Ogasawara clan
- Condition: Ruins; only earthwork walls and dry moat remain

Location
- Site of Hayashi Castle Ogasawara clan castle sites (Japan)
- Coordinates: 36°13′28″N 138°0′37″E

Site history
- Built by: Ogasawara clan
- In use: until 1590

The Ogasawara clan castle sites (小笠原氏城跡, Ogasawara-shi jō-seki) were a number Sengoku period yamashiro-style Japanese castles located in what is now part of the city of Matsumoto, Nagano prefecture. These fortifications were built in the Muromachi period by the Ogasawara clan, who ruled the area at the time. Two of the castle ruins, that of Igawa Castle and Hayashi Castle, have been protected collectively as a National Historic Sites since 2017.

== Background ==
The Matsumoto Basin, in which the current city of Matsumoto is located, was the historic center (kokufu) of Shinano Province since the Nara period. It is also a natural fortification, protected by the Chikuma Mountains to the east, north and south and by the Azusa River to the west. Under the Muromachi shogunate, a branch of the Ogasawara clan was appointed as shugo over the province and Ogasawara Kiyomune established his headquarters at Igawa Castle in 1334. The clan subsequently built many more fortifications around the Matsumoto Basin, including Hayashi Castle, Kirihara Castle, Yamabe Castle, Haibara Castle and Fukashi Castle (later known as Matsumoto Castle) to protect its territory.

However, the Ogasawara were able to maintain only a tenuous hold over Shinano Province. The province is divided into many small (and easily fortified) basins which were ruled by powerful local clans who strongly resented being ruled by outsiders. The Ogasawara clan itself was also frequently rent by internal political divisions, and proved unable to resist the advance of Takeda Shingen into the province at the start of the Sengoku period. Ogasawara Nagatoki (1514-1583) was defeated by Shingen at the Battle of Shiojiritoge Pass in 1548 despite having more numerous forces, and was forced to abandon Shinano. The Takeda made Matsumoto Castle the seat of their operations against Uesugi Kenshin to the north in Echigo Province, but retained Hayashi Castle and other existing fortifications in the Matsumoto Basin to protect their rear. After the Takeda clan was annihilated by Oda Nobunaga, the area briefly came under the rule of Kiso Yoshimasa until Nobunaga's death in 1582. The Ogasawara took advantage of the confused state of affairs after Nobunaga's assassination to return to Shinano with the support of Tokugawa Ieyasu.

However, Toyotomi Hideyoshi ordered the Tokugawa clan to relocate to the Kantō region in 1590, and the Ogasawara were forced to accompany him, abandoning their castles in Shinano. Subsequently, the Ogasawara rose to the position of daimyō within the Tokugawa shogunate.

== Igawa Castle ==
36°13′20.3″N 137°57′20.3″E

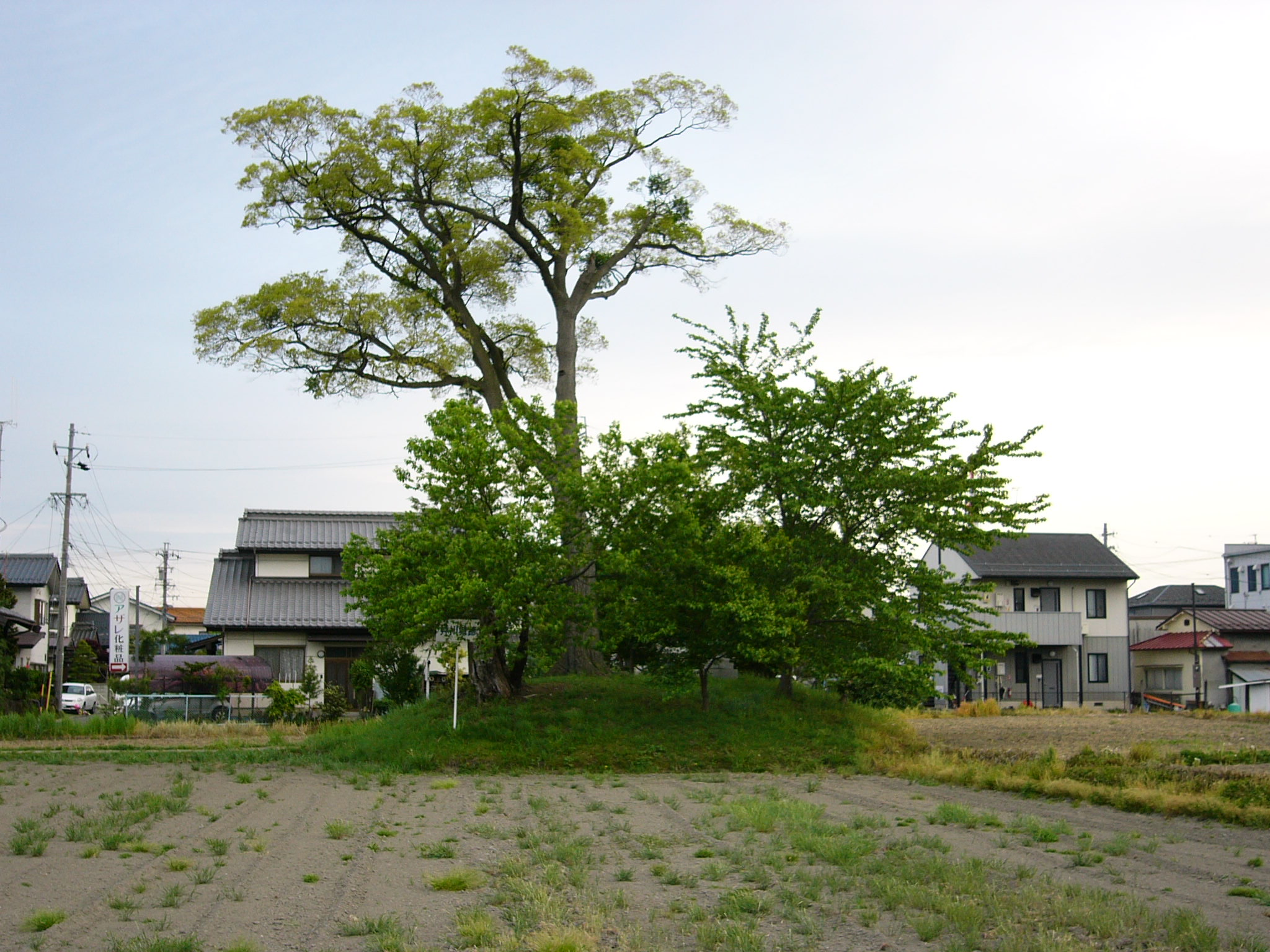
Site of Igawa Castle

Igawa Castle (井川城, Igawa-jō), also known as the Igawa Fortified Residence (井川館, Igawa-no-yakata) was constructed in 1334 when Ogasawara Sadamune was appointed shugo of Shinano. The area was noted for its abundant water supplies, and the castle was a flatland fortification more suitable as a manor house than as a defensive castle. The Ogasawara clan quickly outgrew it, and it was replaced a hundred years later by Hayashi Castle as the clan headquarters, but still existed into the Sengoku period as a secondary fortification.

== Hayashi Castle ==
36°13′28″N 138°0′37″E

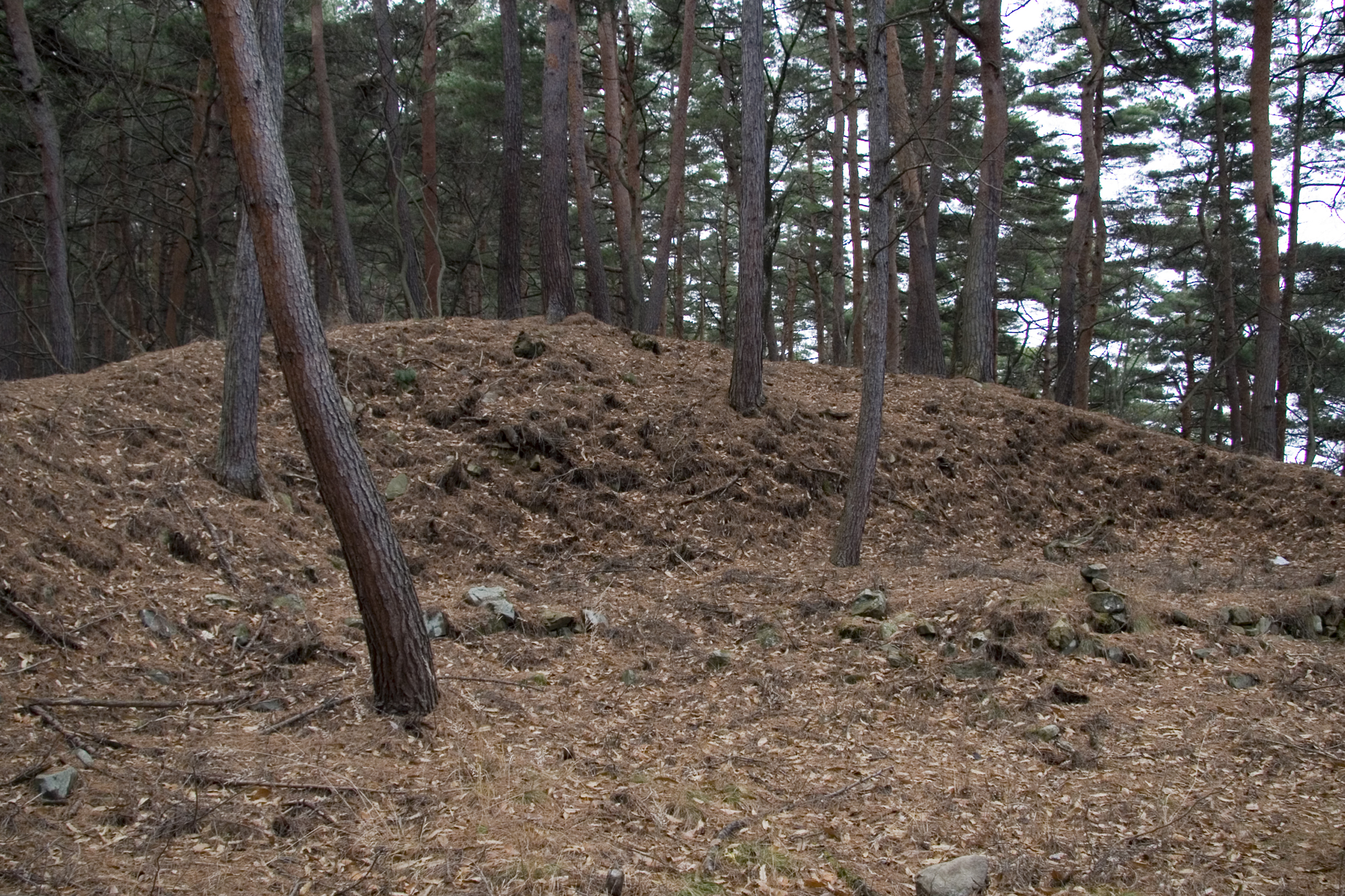
Remnant of rampart of Hayashi Castle

Hayashi Castle (林城, Hayashi-jō) was constructed by Ogasawara Kiyomune in 1459 to replace the smaller Igawa Castle. It is located on a ridge extending northwest from the Takato mountains, in the southeast portion of the modern city of Matsumoto. The castle is actually a double fortification sandwiched in a small valley between two ridges. The northern ridge contained the larger fortification, named the "Hayashi Large Castle" which was the residences of the Ogawasawara lords. The southern ridge was approximately 500 meters away, and contained the smaller fortification, named the "Hayashi Small Castle", which was the main defensive center.

The Hayashi large castle was a flat area at the top of the mountain, approximately 100 square meters, surrounded by clay stone walls. This central area is guarded by terraces in front and dry moats to the rear, but was not readily defensible. The Hayashi small castle was much more heavily fortified, with several terraces at several levels, and stout stone ramparts and dry moats.

Little remains of the castle on the present day site, just some stairs, a well, and some low stone walls.

== See also ==
- List of Historic Sites of Japan (Nagano)
