= Koga Castle =

Japanese castle

Coordinates: 36°11′12.8″N 139°41′43.7″E

Koga Castle 古河城
- Koga, Ibaraki Prefecture, Japan

Site information
- Type: flatland-style Japanese castle
- Condition: ruin

Location

Site history
- Built: Muromachi period
- Built by: Doi clan
- In use: Edo period
- Demolished: 1873

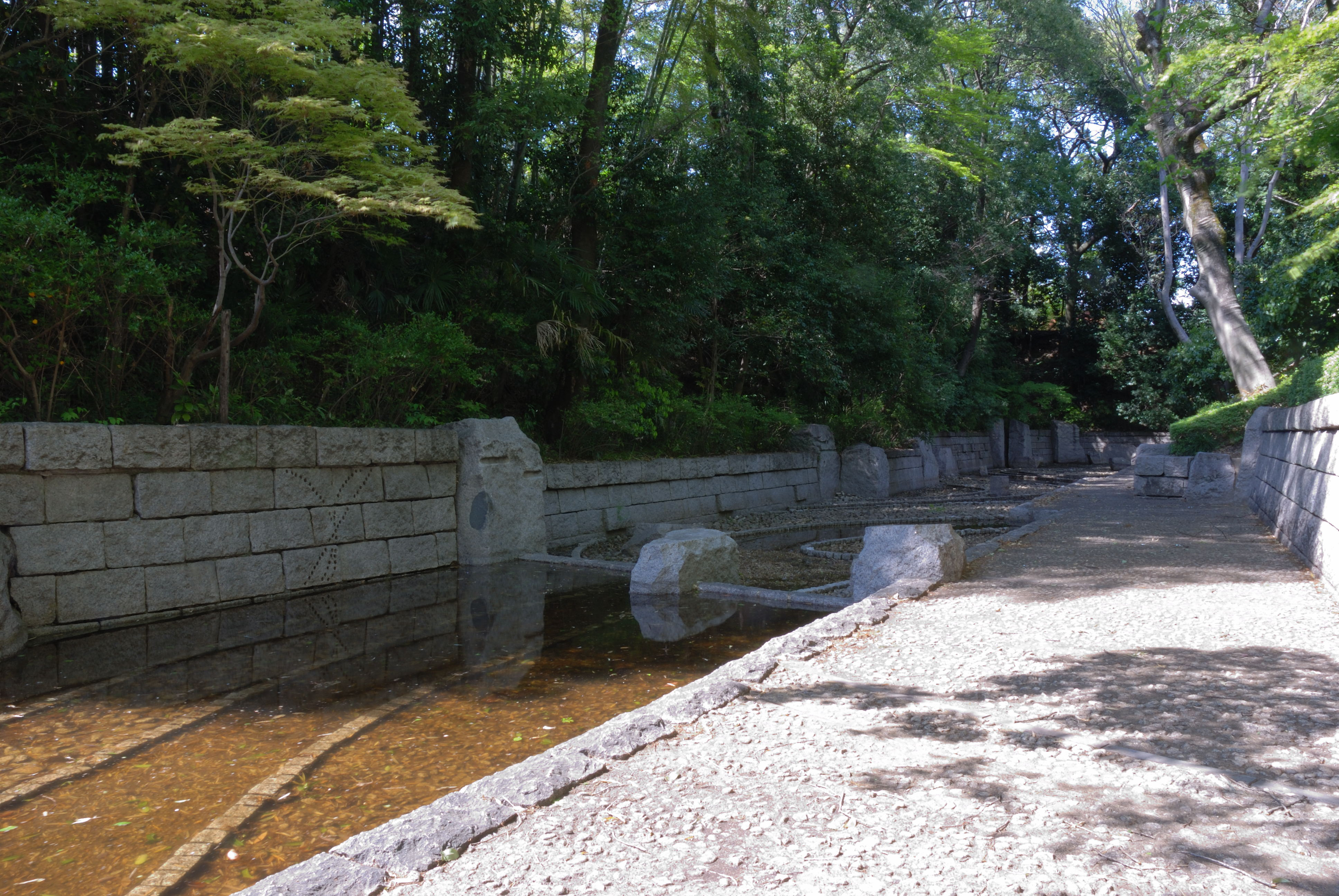
Remaining moat at Suwa Kuruwa

Koga Castle (古河城, Koga-jō) was a Japanese castle located in Koga, Ibaraki Prefecture, Japan. During the Muromachi period, Koga was the seat of the Kantō kubō, under the Ashikaga clan. At the end of the Edo period, Koga Castle was the administrative center of Koga Domain, which was held by a large number of fudai daimyō clans, spending the longest time under the control of the Doi clan (1633-1681, 1762–1871).

== History ==
The fortification at Koga may date to the late Heian period or early Kamakura period, and the Azuma Kagami refers to a fortification in Koga built by Shimokobe Yukihira before 1180, although it is not certain if it was in this location. After the Battle of Uji (1180), the head of Minamoto Yorimasa was brought to Koga by the Shomokobe clan. A Shinto shrine to Minamoto Yorimasa still exists at the present Koga Castle site.

In 1455, the Kantō kubō Ashikaga Shigeuji relocated his seat from Kamakura to Koga. His descendants ruled to 1583, when the castle was taken by the Later Hōjō clan, in the same year Ashikaga Ujinohime took the title Koga kubō. The area was awarded to Tokugawa Ieyasu after the defeat of the Hōjō at the Siege of Odawara (1590) and subsequently became the center of Koga Domain under the Tokugawa shogunate. During the Edo period, much of the castle remained as reconstructed by Doi Toshikatsu in 1633.

Following the Meiji restoration, the structures of the castle were dismantled in 1873. Due to changes in the flow of the Watarase River and flood control work from 1910, almost nothing remains of the castle today.

== Description ==
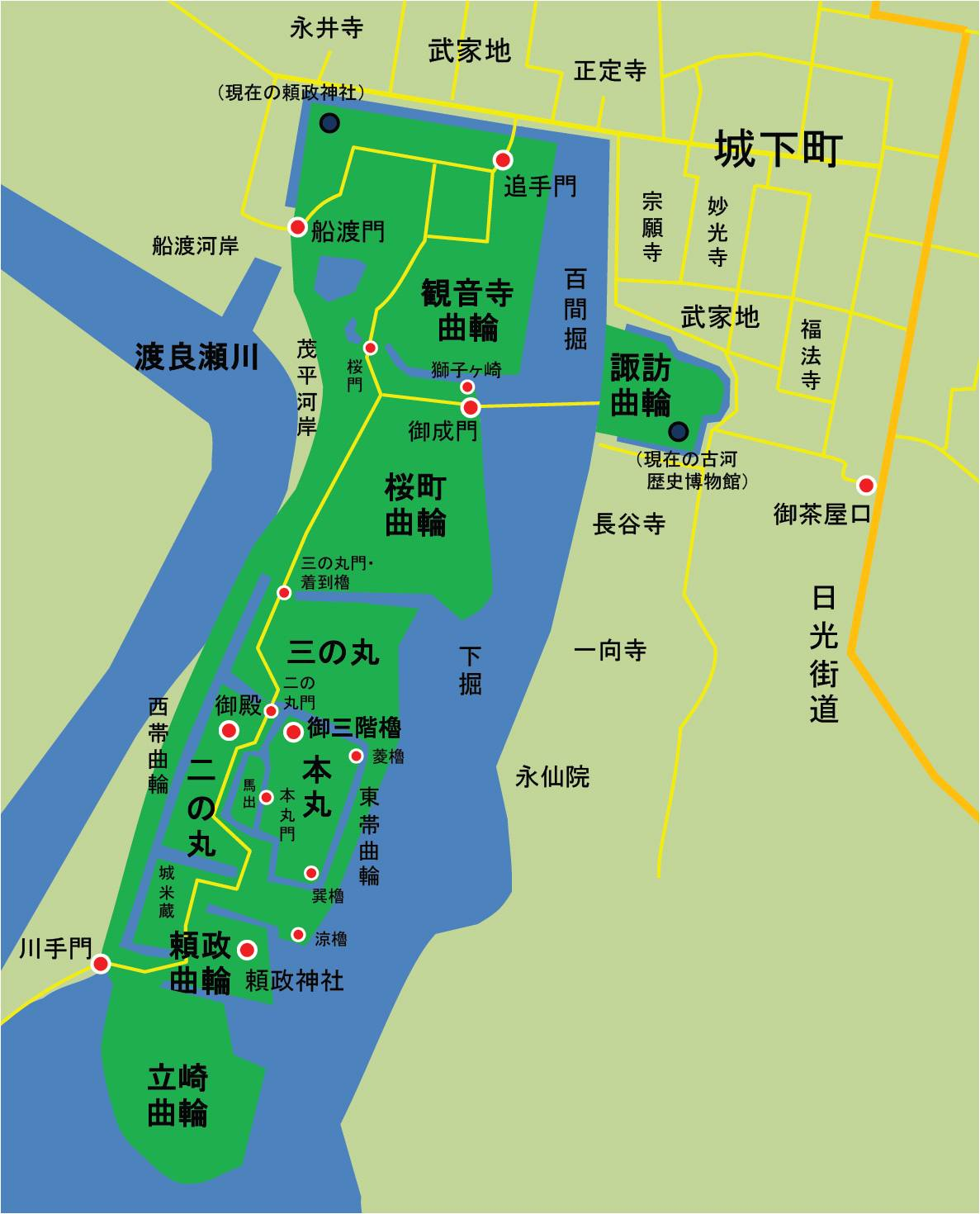
Plan of Koga Castle

Koga Castle was a flatland-style castle built on a long, narrow peninsula in the middle of the Watarase River, with the river itself and wetlands to the east and south forming part of its natural defences. The central bailey Honmaru (本丸) had three-story donjon with a similar size and style as the donjon at Matsue Castle, which was officially styled as a yagura. The Honmaru was protected by the Ni-no-Maru (二の丸) to the west and the San-no-Maru (三の丸) to the north. Further north were two large forecourts: the Marunouchi Kuruwa ( 丸の内曲輪 ) and Kannonji Kuruwa ( 観音寺曲輪 ) and to the east as the long and narrow Higashiobi Kuruwa ( 東帯曲輪), and in the south the Yorimasa Kuruwa ( 頼政曲輪) and the Tatsuzaki Kuruwa ( 辰崎曲輪 ). An additional forecourt, the Suwa Kuruwa (諏訪輪 ) occupied a small area on the opposite bank of the river.

Remaining today are the Yorimasa Jinja shrine on the site of the Yorimasa Kuruwa, and the Koga History Museum on the site of the Suwa Kuruwa, which preserves a fragment of the original moat.

== Literature ==
- Schmorleitz, Morton S. (1974). Castles in Japan. Tokyo: Charles E. Tuttle Co. pp. 144–145. ISBN 0-8048-1102-4.
- Motoo, Hinago (1986). Japanese Castles. Tokyo: Kodansha. p. 200 pages. ISBN 0-87011-766-1.
- Mitchelhill, Jennifer (2004). Castles of the Samurai: Power and Beauty. Tokyo: Kodansha. p. 112 pages. ISBN 4-7700-2954-3.
- Turnbull, Stephen (2003). Japanese Castles 1540-1640. Osprey Publishing. p. 64 pages. ISBN 1-84176-429-9.
