= Ogasawara-ryū =

Japanese system of martial arts and etiquette

The Ogasawara-ryū (小笠原流, "Ogasawara school") is a traditional Japanese system of martial arts and etiquette, formalised and handed down by the Ogasawara clan.

== History ==
The school was originally developed by Ogasawara Nagakiyo during the Kamakura period (1185–1333). It specialised in horsemanship (bajutsu), archery (kyujutsu), mounted archery (yabusame) and etiquette, with an emphasis on ceremonial and ritual practice. Nagakiyo was the first to be called Ogasawara after his own village and was from the Minamoto clan. His father, Minamoto Tomitsu was highly skilled in both literary and military arts. Due to his bravery during the suppression of the Taira Clan, he was given an honorary post.

During the reign of Ashikaga Takauji, the first Ashikaga shōgun, Nagakiyo's descendant Ogasawara Sadamune (1292–1347) was given responsibility for maintaining correct etiquette at Takauji's court, giving the Ogasawara-ryū official sanction. Sadamune was a student of Seisetsu Shōhō (Ch'ing-cho Ch'eng-cheng) and incorporated Seisetsu's Zen practices into the school. Three generations after Sadamune, Ogasawara Nagahide wrote the first manual of courtly etiquette, the Sangi Itto in 1380, after inheriting his father's post. The Sangi Itto also contained the Ogasawara family's teachings on horsemanship and archery. Despite this, the martial aspects of the school's teaching were largely lost by the end of the Muromachi period (1573), and the school survived only as a system of courtly manners. The Ogasawara style of mounted archery was eventually revived in 1724 by Ogasawara Heibei Tsuneharu.

In the 1960s, Tadamune Ogasawara laid claim to the inheritance of the ryū's teachings on formal etiquette, and introduced these elements to the public for the first time. These teachings, under the title of Ogasawara Ryū Reihou, are still in use today. The Lexus auto company trains its salespeople in Ogasawara Ryū Reihou. The Imperial House of Japan uses Ogasawara etiquette and the current master of ceremonies is an heiress of the 52nd Emperor of Japan.

== Etiquette ==
The Ogasawara school laid the foundations for etiquette for the samurai class of Japan. These rules and practices covered bowing (the school's teachings describe nine different ways of performing a bow), eating, marriage and other aspects of everyday life, down to the minutiae of correctly opening or closing a door.
