= Ogasawara Nagahide =

Japanese noble and military commander

Ogasawara Nagahide 小笠原長秀

Shugo of Shinano
- In office 1399–1400
- Preceded by: Shiba Yoshitane
- Succeeded by: none

Personal details
- Born: 18 September 1366
- Died: 15 March 1424 (aged 57) Kyoto
- Relations: Father: Ogasawara Nagamoto; Younger brother: Ogasawara Masayasu

Ogasawara Nagahide (小笠原長秀; September 18, 1366 - March 15, 1424) was a Japanese nobleman and military commander during the Muromachi period (1336 – 1573).

== Sangi ittō ōsōji ==
Nagahide, a scion of the Ogasawara clan, was responsible for codifying the teachings of the Ogasawara-ryū into an anthology titled Sangi ittō ōsōji (三議一統大双紙), " The Three Unified Teachings ". In this work, commissioned by the shōgun Ashikaga Yoshimitsu, he collated his family's practices of horsemanship, archery and etiquette, basing his knowledge on the teachings of his great-grandfather, Ogasawara Sadamune (1294 – 1350). Apart from his role in the compilation of the Sangi ittō ōsōji, Ogasawara was himself an expert at both bajutsu horsemanship and archery.

== Battle of Ōtō ==
Ogasawara, the second son of Ogasawara Nagamoto (1347 – 1407), was appointed shugo (provincial governor) of Shinano Province in 1399 at the age of 33. He entered Shinano in October 1400 and attempted to assume the role of shugo. He was, however, thwarted in the Battle of Ōtō, also called the Insurrection of Shinano, by a combined force of resident ji-samurai led by the Murakami family. The battle was first fought at Shinomiyakawara in present-day Nagano City, but after a loss there Nagahide fled with the remnants of his force of less than 800 horsemen to Shiozaki Castle. Nagahide soon lost Shiozaki Castle and fled to Ōtō Castle, where he suffered a final crushing defeat on October 17, 1400.

== Retreat to Kyoto and death ==
Ōi Mitsunori of the Ōi clan negotiated Nagahide's release from Ōtō Castle, and a despondent Nagahide returned to Kyoto. Ogasawara was dismissed as the shugo governor of Shinano Province, and the control of Shinano Province reverted to local warlords. Nagahide died in 1424 in Kyoto at the age of 59. After his death Nagahide's younger brother Ogasawara Masayasu (1376 – 1442) was appointed shugo of Shinano in 1432 and restored the Ogasawara clan's military power in the region.
