= Tomono clan =

Japanese samurai clan

Tomono clan 伴野氏
- Home province: Shinano
- Parent house: Ogasawara clan

The Tomono clan (伴野氏, Tomono-shi) were a Japanese kin group in Shinano province during the Sengoku Period.

== History ==
The Tomono claim descent from the Ogasawara clan, particularly Ogasawara Nagakiyo.

The clan were weakened after involvement in the Adachi Yasumori affair in 1285. In the Sengoku period they became vassals of Takeda Shingen, but later became retainers of the Tokugawa after the Takeda fell in 1582.
