= Naokatsu =

- Gender: Male

Origin
- Origin: Japanese
- Meaning: Different meanings depending on the kanji used

Naokatsu (written: 直勝) is a masculine Japanese given name. Notable people with the name include:

- Ii Naokatsu (井伊 直勝) (1590–1662), Japanese daimyō
- Nagai Naokatsu (永井 直勝) (1563–1625), Japanese daimyō
