= Nagamichi =

- Gender: Male

Origin
- Origin: Japanese
- Meaning: Different meanings depending on the kanji used

Nagamichi (written: 長礼, 長行 or 長訓) is a masculine Japanese given name. Notable people with the name include:

- Asano Nagamichi (浅野 長訓; 1812–1872), Japanese daimyō
- Nagamichi Kuroda (黒田 長礼; 1889–1978), Japanese ornithologist
- Ogasawara Nagamichi (小笠原 長行; 1822–1891), Japanese samurai
