= Karatsu Domain =

Japanese historical estate in Hizen province

Karatsu Domain 唐津藩
- Domain of Japan
- 1593–1871
- Mon of the Ogasawara clan

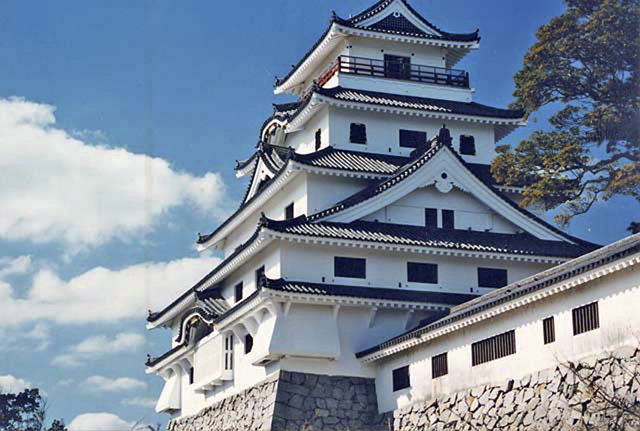
- Donjon of Karatsu Castle
- Capital: Karatsu Castle
- Government
  - Type: Daimyō
- Daimyō
  - 1593-1633: Terazawa Hirotaka (first)
  - 1840-1871: Ogasawara Nagakuni (last)
- Historical era: Edo period
  - Established: 1593
  - Disestablished: 1871
- Today part of: Saga Prefecture
- Location of Kashima Castle Karatsu Domain (Japan)

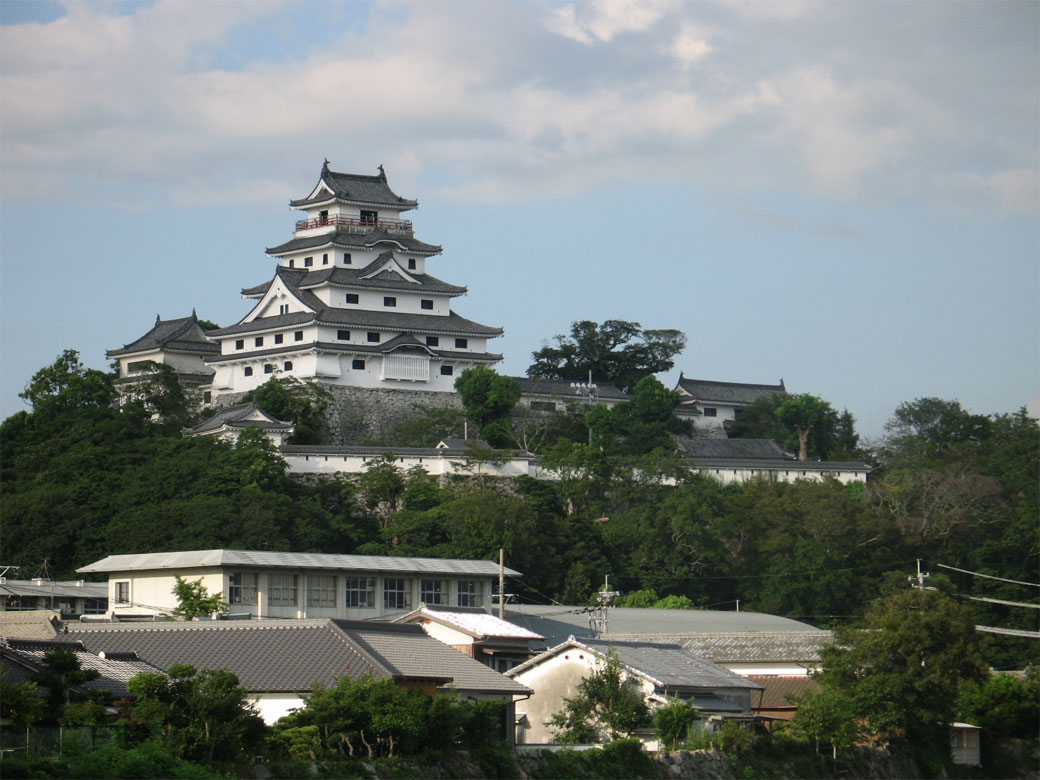
Karatsu Castle

Karatsu Domain 唐津藩 (Karatsu han), located in Hizen Province, was a Japanese domain of the Edo period. It was centered on Karatsu Castle, in what is now the urban center of the city of Karatsu, Saga Prefecture. It was ruled by a number of Fudai daimyō clans in its history, and was controlled in the Bakumatsu period by the Ogasawara clan.

== History ==
Terazawa Hirotaka was a loyal retainer of Toyotomi Hideyoshi and played a significant role during the Japanese invasions of Korea in 1592. Specifically, he worked as a construction worker for Hizen Nagoya Castle and was responsible for managing logistics. In recognition of his contributions, Hideyoshi granted him a commission that included Nagoya in 1593. Additionally, Hirotaka was appointed as the Nagasaki Magistrate and given control over approximately 83,000 koku in the entire Matsura District. He further showcased his capabilities during the Keichō era by actively participating in combat in Korea. Hirotaka's allegiance to the eastern army in the Battle of Sekigahara in 1600 led to being rewarded with an additional 40,000 koku in the Amakusa District, Higo Province by the Tokugawa shogunate. This elevated his status to that of a daimyō with a kokudaka of 123,000 koku, marking the pinnacle of his success. However, following Hirotaka's death, his successor Terazawa Katataka faced challenges during the Shimabara Rebellion. The rebellion spread to Amakusa, and although Katataka was not as strict as Matsukura Katsuie, he implemented harsh policies within his fiefdom. Consequently, the shogunate held him responsible for the rebellion and confiscated his 40,000 koku in Amakusa. Overwhelmed by the stress, Katataka committed seppuku. As he had no heir, the Terazawa clan faced a decline in their fortunes.

Several families were rotated through Karatsu for the next century: two generations of the Ōkubo clan; three generations of the Ogyū-Matsudaira clan, four generations of the Doi clan, and four of the Mizuno clan, including the famous reformer Mizuno Tadakuni. The domain then passed into the hands of Ogasawara Nagamasa, whose family remained until Karatsu domain was abolished in 1871. In 1771, the Niji-no-Matsubara Uprising broke out, triggered by the tax increase imposed on farmers by Mizuno Tadanori, and the farmers were able to bloodlessly reverse the tax increase. Ogasawara Nagayuki, who became the de facto last daimyō of the Karatsu Domain, served as senior councilor and general secretary of foreign affairs during the late Edo period. Moreover, during the Boshin War in 1868, he fought on the side of the former shogunate army all the way to Hakodate, and remained loyal to the shogunate until the end. However, many official documents regard his father, Ogasawara Nagakuni as the last official daimyō as his succession was never officially recognized, and the Karatsu's domain-based administration was forced to pledge military support to the Satchō Alliance of Emperor Meiji.

Ogasawara Naganari, the Meiji period Imperial Japanese Navy admiral, was a descendant of the Ogasawara branch which ruled Karatsu.

== Holdings at the end of the Edo period ==
As with most domains in the han system, Karatsu Domain consisted of several discontinuous territories calculated to provide the assigned kokudaka, based on periodic cadastral surveys and projected agricultural yields.

- Hizen Province
  - 186 villages in Matsura-gun

== List of daimyō ==
	Name	Tenure	Courtesy title	Court Rank	Kokudaka
Terazawa clan, 1593–1647 (Tozama daimyo)
1	Terazawa Hirotaka (寺沢広高)	1593–1633	Shima-no-kami (志摩守)	Junior 4th Rank Lower Grade (従四位下)	83,000 → 123,000 koku
2	Terazawa Katataka (寺沢堅高)	1633–1647	Hyōgo-no-kami (兵庫頭)	Junior 5th Rank Lower Grade (従五位下)	123,000 koku
Ōkubo clan, 1649–1678 (Tozama daimyo)
1	Ōkubo Tadamoto (大久保忠職)	1649–1670	Kaga-no-kami (加賀守)	Junior 4th Rank Lower Grade (従四位下)	83,000 koku
2	Ōkubo Tadatomo (大久保忠朝)	1670–1678	Kaga-no-kami (加賀守)	Junior 5th Rank Lower Grade (従五位下)	83,000 koku
Matsudaira clan, 1678–1691 (Tozama daimyo)
1	Matsudaira Norihisa (松平乗久)	1678–1686	Izumi-no-kami (和泉守)	Junior 4th Rank Lower Grade (従四位下)	70,000 koku
2	Matsudaira Noriharu (松平乗春)	1686–1690	Izumi-no-kami (和泉守)	Junior 4th Rank Lower Grade (従四位下)	70,000 koku
3	Matsudaira Norisato (松平乗邑)	1690–1691	Izumi-no-kami (和泉守)	Junior 4th Rank Lower Grade (従四位下)	60,000 koku
Doi clan, 1678–1691 (Fudai daimyo)
1	Doi Toshimasu (土井利益)	1691–1713	Suō-no-kami (周防守)	Junior 5th Rank Lower Grade (従五位下)	70,000 koku
2	Doi Toshizane (土井利実)	1713–1736	Ōi-no-kami (大炊頭)	Junior 5th Rank Lower Grade (従五位下)	70,000 koku
3	Doi Toshinobu (土井利延)	1736–1744	Ōi-no-kami(大炊頭)	Junior 5th Rank Lower Grade (従五位下)	70,000 koku
4	Doi Toshisato (土井利里)	1744–1762	Ōi-no-kami (大炊頭)	Junior 5th Rank Lower Grade (従五位下)	70,000 koku
Mizuno clan, 1762–1817 (Fudai daimyo)
1	Mizuno Tadatō (水野忠任)	1762–1775	Izumi-no-kami (和泉守)	Junior 5th Rank Lower Grade (従五位下)	60,000 koku
2	Mizuno Tadakane (水野忠鼎)	1775–1805	Ukonoefu (左近将監)	Junior 5th Rank Lower Grade (従五位下)	60,000 koku
3	Mizuno Tadaaki (水野忠光)	1805–1812	Izumi-no-kami (和泉守)	Junior 5th Rank Lower Grade (従五位下)	60,000 koku
4	Mizuno Tadakuni (水野忠邦)	1812–1817	Echizen-no-kami (越前守), Jijū (侍従)	Junior 5th Rank Lower Grade (従五位下)	60,000 koku
Ogasawara clan, 1817–1871 (Fudai daimyo)
1	Ogasawara Nagamasa (小笠原長昌)	1817–1823	Tomoro-no-tsukasa(主殿頭)	Junior 5th Rank Lower Grade (従五位下)	60,000 koku
2	Ogasawara Nagayasu (小笠原長泰)	1823–1833	Iki-no-kami (壱岐守)	Junior 5th Rank Lower Grade (従五位下)	60,000 koku
3	Ogasawara Nagao (小笠原長会)	1833–1836	Noto-no-kami (能登守)	Junior 5th Rank Lower Grade (従五位下)	60,000 koku
4	Ogasawara Nagakazu (小笠原長和)	1836–1840	Sado-no-kami (佐渡守)	Junior 5th Rank Lower Grade (従五位下)	60,000 koku
5	Ogasawara Nagakuni (小笠原長国)	1840–1871	Nakatsukasa daiyū (中務大輔)	Junior 5th Rank Lower Grade (従五位下)	60,000 koku

== See also ==
- List of Han
- Abolition of the han system
