= Koga Domain =

Koga Domain 古河藩
- under Tokugawa shogunate Japan
- 1590–1871
- Capital: Koga Castle
  - Type: Daimyō
- Historical era: Edo period
  - Established: 1590
  - Disestablished: 1871
- Today part of: part of Ibaraki Prefecture

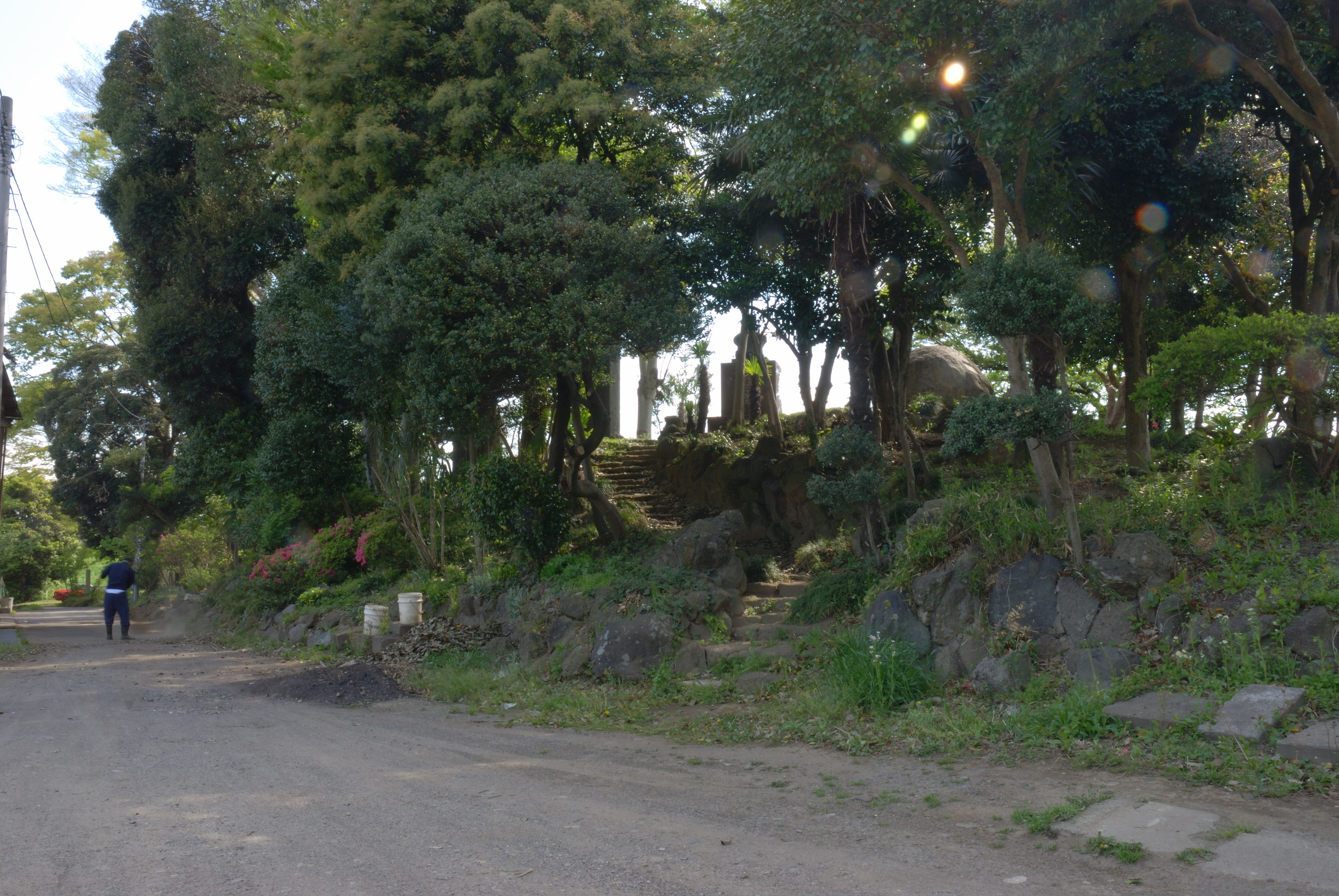
Site of Koga Castle, administrative headquarters of Koga Domain

Koga Domain (古河藩, Koga-han) was a feudal domain under the Tokugawa shogunate of Edo period Japan. It is located in Shimōsa Province, Honshū. The domain was centered at Koga Castle, located in what is the city of Koga in Ibaraki Prefecture.

== History ==
During the Muromachi period, Koga was the seat of the Kantō kubō, under the Ashikaga clan, who vied with the Uesugi clan and with the Later Hōjō clan for control of eastern Japan. Ashikaga Ujinohime was the last Koga-kubo and owner of Koga domain of the Ashikaga lineage.

When Toyotomi Hideyoshi defeated the Hōjō at the Siege of Odawara, the area fell into his hands, and was subsequently assigned (along with the rest of the Kantō region) to Tokugawa Ieyasu. Ieyasu assigned Koga Castle to his grandson-in-law, Ogasawara Hidemasa as daimyō of Koga Domain, with assessed kokudaka of 30,000 koku.

Afterwards, the domain was reassigned every couple of generations to a large number of fudai daimyō clans, spending the longest time under the control of the Doi clan (1633–1681, 1762–1871).

During the Boshin War, the Tokugawa shogunate ordered the domain to provide guards on the foreign settlement at Yokohama. However, the domain capitulated almost immediately on the approach of the imperial forces. The final daimyō of Koga, Doi Toshitomo, served as domain governor until 1871, and was awarded the title of shishaku (marquis) under the kazoku peerage system. Koga Domain subsequently became part of Ibaraki Prefecture.

== Bakumatsu period holdings ==
As with most domains in the han system, Koga Domain consisted of several discontinuous territories calculated to provide the assigned kokudaka, based on periodic cadastral surveys and projected agricultural yields.

- Shimōsa Province
  - 27 villages in Katsushika District
  - 2 villages in Sashima District
- Shimotsuke Province
  - 13 villages in Samukawa District (entire district)
  - 68 villages in Tsuga District
  - 2 villages in Aso District
  - 2 villages in Yanada District
  - 2 villages in Ashikaga District
- Settsu Province
  - 5 villages in Nishinari District
  - 4 villages in Sumiyoshi District
  - 9 villages in Shimashimo
  - 5 villages in Yatabe District
  - 2 villages in Ubara District
- Harima Province
  - 6 villages in Mino District
  - 4 villages in Katō
  - 8 villages in Taka District
  - 2 villages in Kasai District
- Mimasaka Province
  - 30 villages in Kumenanjo District

== List of daimyōs ==
#	Name	Tenure	Courtesy title	Court Rank	kokudaka	Notes
Ogasawara clan (fudai) 1590–1601
1	Ogasawara Hidemasa (小笠原秀政)	1590–1601	Hyōbu-daifu (兵部大輔)	Lower 5th (従五位下)	30,000 koku	transfer to Iida Domain
Toda-Matsudaira clan (fudai) 1602–1612
1	Matsudaira Yasunaga (松平康長)	1602–1612	Tamba-no-kami (丹波守)	Lower 4th (従四位下)	20,000 koku	transfer to Kasama Domain
Ogasawara clan (fudai) 1612–1619
1	Ogasawara Nobuyuki (小笠原信之)	1612–1614	Saemon-no-suke (左衛門佐)	Lower 5th (従五位下)	20,000 koku	transfer from Honjo Domain
2	Ogasawara Masanobu (小笠原政信)	1614–1619	Saemon-no-suke (左衛門佐)	Lower 5th (従五位下)	20,000 koku	transfer to Sekiyado Domain
Okudaira clan (fudai) 1619–1622
1	Okudaira Tadamasa] (奥平忠昌)	1619–1622	Mimasaka-no-kami (美作守)	Lower 4th (従四位下)	110,000 koku	transfer to Utsunomiya Domain
Nagai clan (fudai) 1622–1633
1	Nagai Naokatsu (永井直勝)	1622–1625	Ukon-no-daifu (右近大夫)	Lower 5th (従五位下)	72,000 koku	transfer from Kasama Domain
2	Nagai Naomasa (永井尚政)	1626–1633	Shinano-no-kami (信濃守)	Lower 5th (従五位下)	72,000 koku	transfer to Yodo Domain
Doi clan (fudai) 1633–1681
1	Doi Toshikatsu (土井利勝)	1633–1644	Ooi-no-kami (大炊頭); Jijū (侍従)	Lower 4th (従四位下)	160,000 koku	from Sakura Domain
2	Doi Toshitaka (土井利隆)	1644–1658	Tōtōmi-no-kami (遠江守)	Lower 5th (従五位下)	160,000→130,000 koku	
3	Doi Toshishige (土井利重)	1658–1673	Ooi-no-kami (大炊頭)	Lower 5th (従五位下)	130,000→100,000 koku	
4	Doi Toshihisa (土井利久)	1673–1675	-none-	-none-	100,000→70,000 koku	
5	Doi Toshimasu (土井利益)	1675–1681	Suwo-no-kami (周防守)	Lower 5th (従五位下)	70,000 koku	transfer to Shima Domain
Hotta clan (fudai) 1681–1685
1	Hotta Masatoshi (堀田正俊)	1681–1684	Chikuzen-no-kami (筑前守), Jijū (侍従)	Lower 4th (従四位下)	130,000 koku	transfer from Annaka Domain
2	Hotta Masanaka (堀田正仲)	1684–1685	Shimosa-no-kami (下総守)	Lower 4th (従四位下)	130,000 koku	transfer to Yamagata Domain
Matsudaira (Fujii) clan (fudai) 1685–1693
1	Matsudaira Nobuyuki (松平信之)	1685–686	Hyuga-no-kami (日向守)	Lower 5th (従五位下)	90,000 koku	from Koriyama Domain
2	Matsudaira Tadayuki (松平忠之)	1686–1693	Hyuga-no-kami (日向守)	Lower 5th (従五位下)	90,000 koku	dispossessed
Matsudaira (Nagasawa-Ōkōchi) clan (fudai) 1694–1712
1	Matsudaira Nobuteru (松平信輝)	1694–1709	Izu-no-kami (伊豆守)	Lower 5th (従五位下)	70,000 koku	from Shima-Toba Domain
2	Matsudaira Nobutoki (松平信祝)	1709–1712	Izu-no-kami (伊豆守)	Lower 5th (従五位下)	70,000 koku	to Yoshida Domain
Honda clan (fudai) 1712–1759
1	Honda Tadanaga (本多忠良)	1712–1751	Nakatsukasa-daiyu (中務大輔), Jijū (侍従)	Lower 4th (従四位下)	50,000 koku	from Kariya Domain
2	Honda Tadahisa (本多忠敞)	1751–1759	Nakatsukasa-daiyu (中務大輔)	Lower 5th (従五位下)	50,000 koku	transfer to Hamada Domain
Matsudaira (Matsui) clan (fudai) 1759–1762
1	Matsudaira Mitsuyuki (松平康福)	1759–1762	Suo-no-kami (周防守), Jijū (侍従)	Lower 4th (従四位下)	50,000 koku	transfer to Okazaki Domain
Doi clan (fudai) 1762–1871
1	Doi Toshisato (土井利里)	1762–1777	Ooi-no-kami (大炊頭); Jijū (侍従)	Lower 4th (従四位下)	70,000 koku	
2	Doi Toshichika (土井利見)	1777–1777	Mimasaka-no-kami (美濃守)	Lower 5th (従五位下)	70,000 koku	
3	Doi Toshiatsu (土井利厚)	1777–1822	Ooi-no-kami (大炊頭); Jiju (侍従)	Lower 4th (従四位下)	70,000→80,000 koku	
4	Doi Toshitsura (土井利位)	1822–1848	Ooi-no-kami (大炊頭); Jiju (侍従)	Lower 4th (従四位下)	80,000 koku	
5	Doi Toshinari (土井利亨)	1848–1848	Ooi-no-kami (大炊頭)	Lower 5th (従五位下)	80,000 koku	
6	Doi Toshinori (土井利則)	1848–1867	Ooi-no-kami (大炊頭)	Lower 5th (従五位下)	80,000 koku	
7	Doi Toshitomo (土井利与)	1867–1871	Ooi-no-kami (大炊頭)	Lower 5th (従五位下)	80,000 koku	

== See also ==
- List of Han
