= Nagai Naomasa =

Japanese daimyō

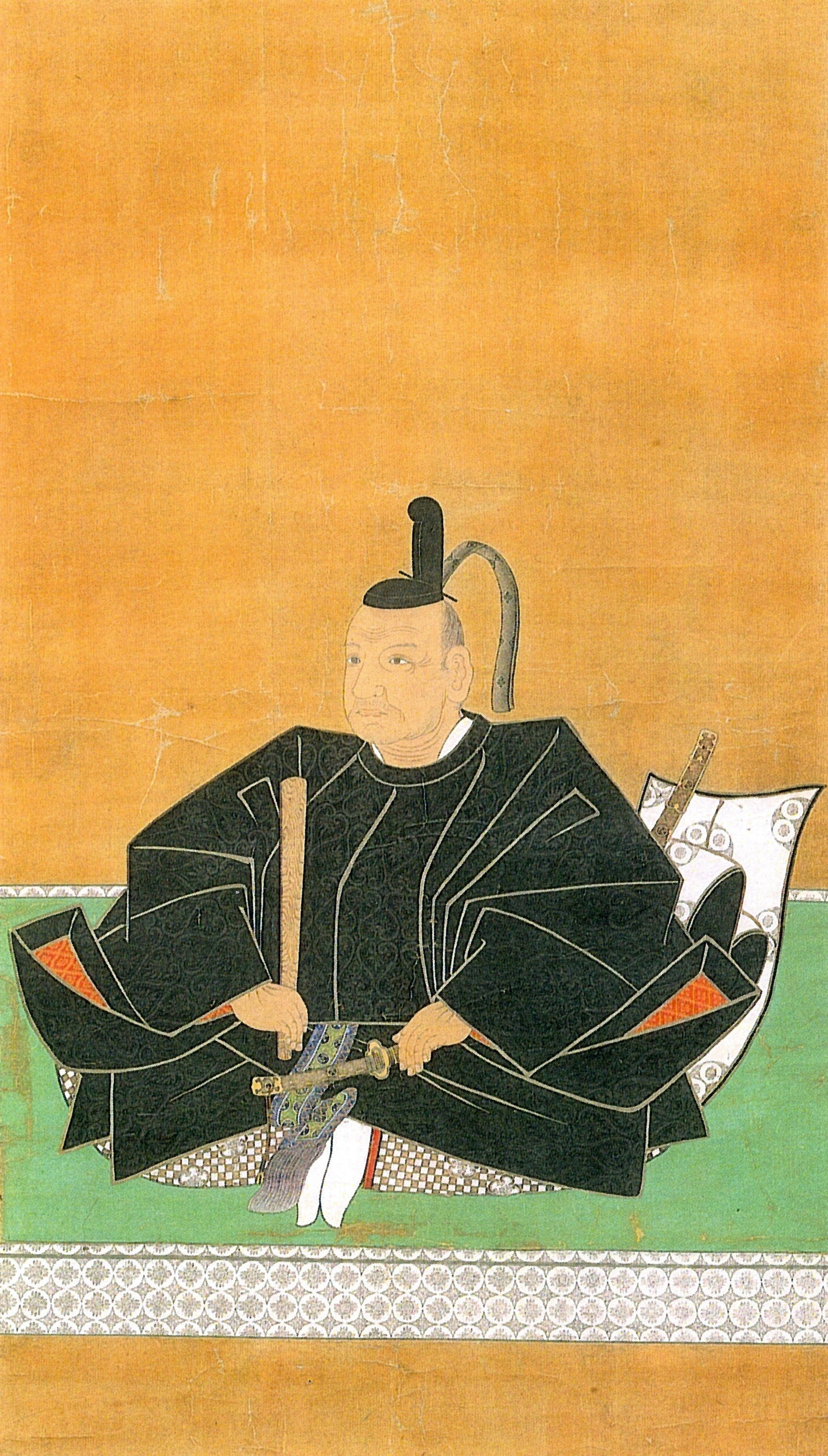

Nagai Naomasa (永井 尚政; 1587 – October 16, 1668) was a Japanese daimyō of the Edo period, who ruled the Uruido, Koga and Yodo Domains. The eldest son of Nagai Naokatsu, he fought at the Battle of Sekigahara and the siege of Osaka. During the Shimabara Rebellion he was assigned to defend Kyoto.

Naomasa held junior 4th court rank, lower grade (従四位下, ju shii no ge) and the title of Shinano no Kami. He retired in early 1658 and became a monk, taking the name Shinsai.

Preceded by none	First Daimyō of Uruido (Nagai); 1619–1626	Succeeded by none
Preceded by Nagai Naokatsu	Second Daimyō of Koga (Nagai); 1626–1633	Succeeded by Doi Toshikatsu
Preceded by Matsudaira Sadatsuna	First Daimyō of Yodo (Nagai); 1633–1658	Succeeded by Nagai Naoyuki
