= Doi Toshisato =

Japanese daimyō

Doi Toshisato (土井 利里; 1722 – September 11, 1777) was a Japanese daimyō of the Edo period, who ruled the Karatsu Domain and later the Koga Domain. He was also an official of the Tokugawa shogunate, and held the post of Kyoto Shoshidai. He died in Kyoto while on duty.

| Preceded by Abe Masachika | 26th Kyoto Shoshidai; 1769–1777 | Succeeded by Kuze Hiroakira |
| Preceded by Doi Toshinobu | 4th Daimyō of Karatsu (Doi); 1744–1762 | Succeeded by Mizuno Tadatō |
