= Ogasawara Nagakuni =

Daimyō of Karatsu, Hizen, Kyūshū, Japan

Ogasawara Nagakuni 小笠原 長国

6th Lord of Karatsu
- In office 1840–1871
- Preceded by: Ogasawara Nagayoshi
- Succeeded by: none

Personal details
- Born: July 9, 1824 Matsumoto, Shinano Province, Japan
- Died: April 23, 1877 (aged 52) Japan

Ogasawara Nagakuni (小笠原 長国; July 9, 1824 – April 23, 1877) was the 6th and final daimyō of Karatsu Domain in Hizen Province, Kyūshū, Japan (modern-day Saga Prefecture). Before the Meiji Restoration, his courtesy titles were title of Sado no Kami and junior 5th, lower grade court rank (ju go i no ge 従五位下).

== Biography ==
Nagakuni was the eldest son of Matsudaira Mitsutsune, the daimyo of Matsumoto Domain in Shinano province. In October 1840, when the 4th daimyo of Karatsu, Ogasawara Nagayoshi died without heirs, the Tokugawa Bakufu selected him as his replacement, and he was posthumously adopted as Nagayoshi’s son.

Nagakuni found his new domain in dire financial straits, and made efforts to avoid bankruptcy through establishment of domain monopolies on whaling and charcoaling. However, Nagakuni was the fourth adopted daimyo in a row in Karatsu domain from the time of Ogasawara Nagamasa, and quickly found his efforts hampered by Ogasawara Nagamichi, a younger son of the first lord who had been bypassed in the succession, but who wielded considerable behind-the-scenes political influence. The domain's government was divided into factions, and Nagakuni, as both an outsider and newcomer had a much weaker position than Nagamichi. Nagakuni attempted to heal the rift by adopting Nagamichi as his heir, but this had the result of all power devolving to Nagamichi, leaving Nagakuni as little more than a figurehead.

In 1868, with the start of the Boshin War, Karatsu domain remained strongly in support of the Tokugawa Bakufu. In the Bakumatsu period, Nagayuki served as a Rōjū in the government, and Karatsu domain itself was a Fudai domain, unlike the neighboring Nabashima domains, which were of Tozama domain status. The Ogasawara remained loyal to the Tokugawa to the end, with many samurai accompanying the remnants of the Tokugawa army north to join the Republic of Ezo and fighting in the Battle of Hakodate.

In June 1869, the title of daimyō was abolished, and Nagakuni was appointed governor of Karatsu domain. However, in 1871, Karatsu domain itself was abolished with the abolition of the han system, and became part of the new Saga Prefecture. Nagakuni retired in September 1873, relocated to Tokyo, and died in 1877.

Preceded by Ogasawara Nagayoshi	6th Lord of Karatsu; 1840-1871	Succeeded by none
