= Doi Toshikatsu =

Daimyo

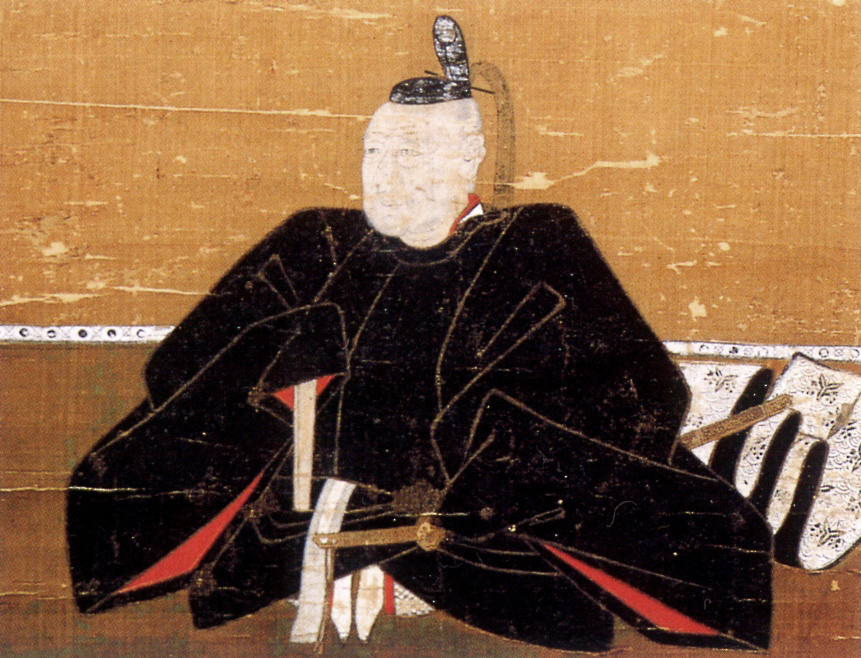
Doi Toshikatsu

Doi Toshikatsu (土井 利勝; April 19, 1573 – August 12, 1644) was a top-ranking official in Japan's Tokugawa shogunate during its early decades, and one of the chief advisors to the second Tokugawa shōgun, Hidetada.

The adopted son of Doi Toshimasa, Toshikatsu is generally believed to be the biological son of Mizuno Nobumoto, though there are some who claim he was an illegitimate son of shōgun Tokugawa Ieyasu. He served the shogunate as an advisor to shōgun Tokugawa Hidetada for many years, and played an important role in communicating and overseeing the enforcement of shogunal policy across the country; Doi also helped oversee trade and diplomatic relations between Japan and the Thai Kingdom of Ayutthaya. He lost much of his influence and power upon Hidetada's death in 1632. Six years later, Doi became one of the first to be appointed to the newly created post of Tairō (Great Elder), and was made daimyō (feudal lord) of Koga Domain in Shimōsa Province, with a revenue of 160,000 koku.

On April 7, 1633, he was transferred to Koga, Shimōsa Province, with an increased fief of 162,000 koku. In 1635, he revised the Buke shohatto law code by adding alternate attendance to the shogunate and increasing the number of articles to 19, solidifying the shogunate's system of control. Shortly after Iemitsu took power, Tokugawa Tadanaga and Kato Tadahiro were stripped of their titles. Toshikatsu, who had been secretly plotting with Iemitsu, pretended to be at odds with Iemitsu and sent letters to the various daimyo warning of rebellion. The other daimyo immediately submitted the letters to Iemitsu, but Tadahiro and Tadanaga did not, which is said to have led to their removal from the ranks.

== See also ==
- Doi clan

Preceded by Matsudaira Tadatoshi	First Daimyō of Omigawa (Doi); 1602–1610	Succeeded by Andō Shigenobu
Preceded by Ogasawara Yoshitsugu	First Daimyō of Sakura (Doi); 1608–1633	Succeeded by Ishikawa Tadafusa
Preceded by Nagai Naomasa	First Daimyō of Koga (Doi); 1633–1644	Succeeded by Doi Toshitaka
