= Ogasawara Nagamichi =

Ogasawara Nagamichi 小笠原 長行
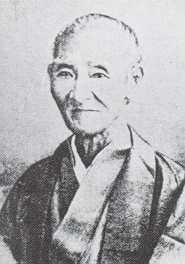
- Ogasawara Nagamichi in his later years

Rōjū
- In office 1862 – 1868; Brief periods of resignation in 1864 and late 1865

Field officer (sanbō) of the Northern Alliance
- In office 1868–1868

Personal details
- Born: June 29, 1822 Karatsu, Hizen Province, Japan
- Died: January 25, 1891 (aged 68) Tokyo, Japan

Ogasawara Nagamichi (小笠原 長行; June 29, 1822 – January 25, 1891) was a Japanese samurai and official in the Bakumatsu period Tokugawa Shogunate. Before the Meiji Restoration, his courtesy title was Iki no Kami and lower 5th Court rank.

== Biography ==
Nagamichi was the eldest son of Ogasawara Nagamasa, the first Ogasawara daimyō of Karatsu Domain in Hizen Province, Kyūshū, Japan (modern-day Saga Prefecture). An infant at the time of his father’s death, he was bypassed in the succession by Ogasawara Nagayasu, originally the son of Sakai Tadaari of Shonai Domain. Nagayasu died without heirs, and was replaced in turn by Ogasawara Nagao, and Ogasawara Nagakazu, each of whom was adopted into the Ogasawara clan as a successor, and each of whom died without heirs.

Nagamichi was never chosen to be daimyō, but developed a political base within Karatsu Domain and was de facto ruler of the domain for much of his adult life. The final daimyō of Karatsu, Ogasawara Nagakuni attempted to end the factionalism in Karatsu by the expediency of adopting Nagakuni as his son and heir; the result was that all power devolved to Nagamachi, leaving Nagamichi as little more than a figurehead.

Nagayuki became a prominent official in the Tokugawa shogunate, with the positions of wakadoshiyori in 1862; rōjū-kaku in 1862-1863 and in 1865; and rōjū in 1865-1866 and in 1866-1868. During these periods, he was primarily involved with foreign affairs, and was one of the senior Japanese officials during negotiations with Great Britain over reparations following the Namamugi Incident. In 1868, with the start of the Boshin War, Karatsu Domain remained strongly in support of the Tokugawa bakufu. Karatsu domain was a fudai domain, unlike the neighboring Nabashima domains, which were of tozama domain status. The Ogasawara remained loyal to the Tokugawa to the end, with Nagamichi and many samurai accompanying the remnants of the Tokugawa army north to join the Northern Alliance and then the Republic of Ezo, fighting in the Battle of Hakodate.

After the war, Nagamichi lived in retirement in Tokyo. In June 1869, the title of daimyō was abolished, and in 1871, Karatsu domain itself was abolished with the abolition of the han system, and became part of the new Saga Prefecture.

His son, Admiral Ogasawara Naganari, became a viscount under the new kazoku peerage system; however, Nagamichi was not awarded a title, perhaps due to his involvement with the pro-Tokugawa side in the Boshin War. However, his lower 5th court rank was raised to 4th court rank in June 1880. He died in Tokyo in 1891.

== See also ==
- Ogasawara clan
