= Hōjō Ujinori =

Hōjō Ujinori (北条 氏規; 1545 – March 22, 1600) was the fourth son of Hōjō Ujiyasu. Very early in his life he became an acquaintance of Tokugawa Ieyasu, because he alike was also at the time a hostage of the Imagawa. Far later in 1590, he was persuaded to surrender when Odawara Castle was attacked by Toyotomi Hideyoshi. He then set off to Odawara in an attempt to negotiate peace.

Tokugawa Ieyasu granted Ujinori the Sayama fiefdom, an estate of ten thousand koku. After Ujinori's death, the legacy of the Hōjō clan will be continued by his son, Hōjō Ujimori.
