= Nagai Naokatsu =

Daimyo

Nagai Naokatsu (永井 直勝; 1563 – March 5, 1625) was a Japanese daimyō of the Azuchi–Momoyama period to early Edo period. He was a retainer of Tokugawa Ieyasu, first serving under Ieyasu's son Nobuyasu.

After Nobuyasu's execution, Naokatsu left Tokugawa service, but later returned, serving at the Battle of Nagakute in 1584. He fought with distinction at Nagakute, personally killing the enemy general Ikeda Nobuteru. In recognition for his service, he received lordship of the Kasama Domain (Hitachi Province) after taking part within the Summer Campaign of Osaka during 1615, and was then transferred to the Koga Domain (Shimōsa) seven years later.

Naokatsu died at age 63 in 1625, and was succeeded by his eldest son Naomasa. Naokatsu's descendants eventually came to rule the Kanō Domain in Mino Province, where they remained until the Meiji Restoration.

Preceded by Matsudaira Yasunaga	First Daimyō of Kasama (Nagai); 1617–1622	Succeeded by Asano Nagashige
Preceded by Okudaira Tadamasa	First Daimyō of Koga (Nagai); 1622–1625	Succeeded by Nagai Naomasa
