= Seisetsu Shōchō =

Chinese Buddhist missionary to Japan

Seisetsu Shōchō (Ch'ing-cho Cheng-ch'eng, 清拙正澄; 1274–1339) was a Chinese Buddhist missionary to Japan.

A disciple of Ku-lin Ch'ing-mao (古林清茂), of the Rinzai school, Seisetsu was an adherent of the gozan movement, which subsumed religious practices to secular authority.

Seisetsu emigrated to Japan from Fuzhou in 1326, with three disciples. Unimpressed with the native Buddhist clergy's adherence to traditional Japanese customs, he instituted major reforms in Zen Buddhism, based on Chinese practices. He travelled widely, visiting Kamakura and Kyoto, and was abbot of Nanzen-ji for a time. He compiled the Daikan Shingi, a treatise on Buddhist practices and etiquette, as a guide for Japanese priests. Seisetsu was also influential in the secular world, being a mentor of Ogasawara Sadamune.
