= Ogasawara Naganari =

Viscount Ogasawara Naganari
- 小笠原 長生
- Born: December 15, 1867; Saga prefecture, Japan
- Died: September 20, 1958 (aged 90)
- Military career
- Allegiance: Empire of Japan
- Branch: Imperial Japanese Navy
- Service years: 1887–1921
- Rank: Vice Admiral
- Conflicts: First Sino-Japanese War; Russo-Japanese War

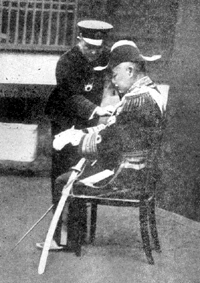
Ogasawara (standing) and Fleet Admiral Tōgō Heihachirō (seated)

Viscount Ogasawara Naganari (小笠原 長生; December 15, 1867 – September 20, 1958) was an Admiral and naval strategist in the Imperial Japanese Navy in Meiji and Taishō period Japan, and a member of the Imperial Japanese Navy General Staff. He was also known as Ogasawara Chōsei, Ogasawara Nagayo.

== Biography ==
Ogasawara was born in Saga prefecture. His father was the Rōjū Ogasawara Nagamichi, a senior retainer of the Tokugawa shogunate. As his father was forced into retirement by the events of the Boshin War of the Meiji Restoration. Ogasawara Naganari succeeded his grandfather to become head of the Ogasawara clan in 1873, and as viscount (shishaku) under the kazoku peerage system. He attended the Gakushuin Peers’ School, and subsequently graduated 35th out of 45 cadets at the 14th class of the Imperial Japanese Naval Academy. One of his classmates was the future Prime Minister of Japan Kantarō Suzuki.

As an ensign, Ogasawara served in combat during the First Sino-Japanese War on the cruiser Takachiho at the Battle of the Yalu River. He was subsequently served on the Amagi before transferred to the Navy General Staff Records Department, and assigned to compile an official record of naval operations during the war (which was published in 1903). Ogasawara continued to serve on the General Staff as a naval intelligence officer through the Russo-Japanese War and World War I, rising to the rank of vice admiral by 1918, aside from a one-year tour of sea duty as executive officer of the Chiyoda in 1903, and as captain of the cruiser Tokiwa and battleship Katori in 1912. He was an expert on codes and ciphers, but by the time he had reached flag rank, he was best known as public relations expert for the navy, with his colorful writings on naval history earning him the nickname of the "literary admiral".

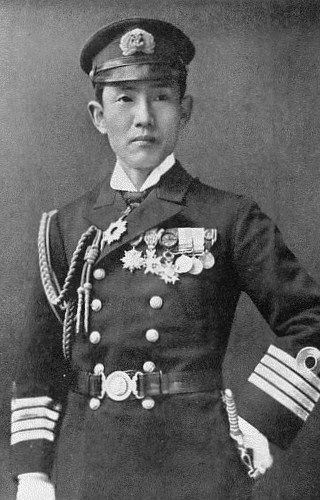
Naganari, c. 1913

Along with Akiyama Saneyuki and Satō Tetsutarō, Ogasawara was a close confidant of Fleet Admiral Tōgō Heihachirō and an early proponent of the naval strategies of Alfred Thayer Mahan. When Admiral Suzuki Kantarō, then an instructor at the Naval Staff College, confessed that the English language original of Mahan’s The Influence of Sea Power upon History was too difficult for him to understand, and further complained that the existing Japanese translation was written in archaic, florid prose barely legible to naval cadets, Ogasawara, then a lieutenant commander, was assigned by Navy Chief of Staff Itō Sukeyuki to write a new translation. The result was a simplified version, On the History of the Imperial Japanese Navy (帝國海軍史論, Teikoku Kaigun Shiron), which explained Mahan’s work using examples from Japanese history, published in 1898. The work was used to win public support for increases in the naval budget and copies were distributed to secondary schools across the empire. Ogasawara used his own experiences in the Battle of the Yalu River validate Mahan’s concept of the command of the sea, and the Triple Intervention as an example of Japan’s maritime vulnerability. Ogasawara was later an instructor at the Naval War College, where he continued to stress the importance of sea power. He went onto the reserve list in 1921, but remained a close confidant of Tōgō, and was strongly opposed to the naval reductions proposed during the 1927 Geneva Naval Conference and 1930 London Naval Treaty.

After his retirement from active duty, he served as an aide de camp to the Imperial Household Agency, supporting the promotion of Prince Fushimi Hiroyasu to the post of Chief of the Navy General Staff and Ōsumi Mineo as Navy Minister. He was also tutor to the Crown Prince (the future Emperor Hirohito) on naval issues.

Ogawasawa was the author of Life of Admiral Togo, a biography of Admiral Heihachiro Togo which was first published in 1921.

His eldest son, Meiho Ogasawara became a movie director, and later a movie producer and his younger son, Shojiro Ogasawara became an actor. In 1930, Nikkatsu Studios released a movie on the Battle of Tsushima in the Russo-Japanese War. Titled Gekimetsu (撃滅), it was written by Ogasawara Naganari, directed by his son Meiho, and had his son Shojiro in its cast.
