= Ogasawara Nagatsune =

Ogasawara Nagatsune (小笠原 長経; May 17, 1179 – November 5, 1247) in the province of Shinano. He was the eldest son of Ogasawara Nagakiyo and the rightful inheritor of the art of Ogasawara-ryu archery and mounted archery.

His wife was a daughter of Takeda Tomonobu. Some of his children were Ogasawara Nagafusa, Akazawa Kiyotsune, Tamura Nagazane, Ueno Morinaga, and Akazato Nagamura among others.
