= Ogasawara clan =

Japanese samurai clan

Ogasawara 小笠原
- The emblem (mon) of the Ogasawara clan
- Home province: Shinano
- Parent house: Takeda clan
- Titles: Shugo; Daimyō
- Founder: Ogasawara Nagakiyo
- Founding year: 13th century
- Dissolution: still extant
- Cadet branches: Miyoshi clan; Mizukami clan; Tomono clan; Hayashi clan (Jōzai)

The Ogasawara clan (Japanese: 小笠原氏, Hepburn: Ogasawara-shi) was a Japanese samurai clan descended from the Seiwa Genji. The Ogasawara acted as shugo (governors) of Shinano Province during the Sengoku period (c. 1185–1600), and as daimyō (feudal lords) of territories on Kyūshū during the Edo period (1600–1867).

During the Kamakura and Muromachi periods, the clan controlled Shinano province, while related clans controlled the provinces of Awa, Bizen, Bitchū, Iwami, Mikawa, Tōtōmi and Mutsu. According to some theories, the Miyoshi clan and the Mizukami clan were descendants of the Ogasawara clan.

The clan developed a number of schools of martial arts during this period, known as Ogasawara-ryū, and contributed to the codification of bushido etiquette.

Towards the end of the Sengoku period (late 16th century), the clan opposed both Toyotomi Hideyoshi and Tokugawa Ieyasu.

During the Edo period, the Ogasawara were identified as one of the fudai or insider daimyō clans which were hereditary vassals or allies of the Tokugawa, in contrast with the tozama or outsider clans.

== Ogasawara clan branches ==
The fudai Ogasawara clan originated in 12th century Shinano Province. They claim descent from Takeda Yoshikiyo and the Seiwa-Genji. Broadly, there are two genealogical lines of the Ogasawara, the Matsuo and the Fukashi, each of which identify places in Shinano. The Matsuo line gave rise to the Ogasawara of Echizen, and the Fukashi line is ultimately established at the Ogasawara of Bunzen.

The great-grandson of Yoshikiyo, Nagakiyo, was the first to take the name Ogasawara. The area controlled by his descendants grew to encompass the entire province of Shinano.

Nagakiyo's descendant, Ogasawara Hidemasa (1569–1615), served Ieyasu; and in 1590, Hidemasa received Koga Domain (20,000 koku) in Shimōsa Province. In 1601, Ieyasu transferred Hidemasa to Iida Domain (50,000 koku) in Shinano; then, in 1613, he was able to return to the home of his forebears, Fukashi Castle (80,000 koku), now known as Matsumoto Castle.

The branches of the fudai Ogasawara clan include the following:

- The senior branch of the Ogasawara from the beginning were daimyō at Fukashi; then, in 1617, the daimyō was transferred to Akashi Domain (120,000 koku) in Harima Province. In the years spanning 1632 through 1868, the descendants of this branch of the Ogasawara were daimyō at Kokura Domain (150,000 koku) in Buzen Province. The head of this clan line was ennobled as a "Count" in 1884.
- A cadet branch of the Ogasawara were daimyō at Chizuka Domain (10,000 koku) in Buzen Province up through the Meiji Restoration. The head of this clan line was ennobled as a "Viscount" in the Meiji period.
- A cadet branch of the Ogasawara were daimyō in 1617 at Tatsuno Domain in Harima Province; and in 1632, they were transferred as daimyō at Nakatsu Domain in Buzen Province. In the period spanning the years 1716 through 1868, the descendants of this branch of the Ogasawara were daimyō at Anshi Domain (10,000 koku) in Harima Province. The head of this clan line was ennobled as a "Viscount" in the Meiji period.
- A cadet branch of the Ogasawara were daimyō in 1632 at Kizuki Domain in Bungo Province; in 1645 at Yoshida Domain in Mikawa Province; in 1697 at Iwatsuki Domain in Musashi Province; in 1711 at Kakegawa Domain in Tōtōmi Province; and in 1747 at Tanakura Domain in Mutsu Province. Finally, in the years spanning 1817 through 1868, the descendants of this branch of the Ogasawara were daimyō at Karatsu Domain (60,000 koku) in Hizen Province. The head of this clan line was ennobled as a "Viscount" in the Meiji period.
- A cadet branch of the Ogasawara claim a line of descent from Takeda Yoshikiyo and also descent from Ogasawara Sadamune who had joined Nitta Yoshisada in overthrowing the Hōjō at Kamakura in the 14th century. This same Sadamune had been a general under Ashikaga Takauji. This branch of the Ogasawara were established in 1590 at Honjō Domain in Musashi Province; in 1608 at Koga Domain in Shimōsa Province; in 1619 at Sekiyado Domain in Shimōsa province; and in 1637 at Takasu Domain in Mino Province. In the years spanning 1691 through 1868, this branch of the Ogasawara were daimyō at Echizen-Katsuyama Domain (22,000 koku) in Echizen Province. The head of this clan line was ennobled as a "Viscount" in the Meiji period.

== Ogasawara-Miyoshi line ==
The Miyoshi clan of daimyō were cadet descendants of the Ogasawara; and through them, they were also descendants of the Seiwa-Genji Minamoto. At the beginning of the 14th century, Ogasawara Nagafusa established himself in Shikoku. Amongst his descendants in the 8th generation was Yoshinaga, who established himself at Miyoshi in Awa province (now Tokushima Prefecture).

Osagawa Yoshinaga took the name Miyoshi Yoshinaga and became a vassal of the Hosokawa clan, who were then the strongest force on the island. Accounts from the late 16th century include mention of Miyoshi Yoshitsugu as the nephew and adopted son of Miyoshi Chōkei. Any remnants of the Miyoshi branch of the Ogasawara clan would have been vanquished by the Chōsokabe clan as they gradually took control of the entire island of Shikoku.

== Notable clan members ==
- Ogasawara Sadamune, 1294–1350.
- Ogasawara Nagaharu, 1299–1369.
- Ogasawara Nagahide, 1366–1424.
- Ogasawara Nagatoki, 1519–1583.
- Ogasawara Ujioki, 1529–1569.
- Ogasawara Nagatada, d. 1590.
- Ogasawara Hidemasa, 1569–1615.
- Ogasawara Sadayori, d. 1625.
- Ogasawara Ichian
- Ogasawara Tadazane, 1596–1667.
- Ogasawara Tadamoto
- Ogasawara Nagashige, 1650–1732. – 11th Kyoto shoshidai.
- Ogasawara Nagamichi, 1822–1891.
  - Miyoshi Yutaka – ??-1869 – brother of Nagamichi; Shinsengumi)
- Ogasawara Tadanobu, 1862–1897.
- Ogasawara Naganari, 1867–1958. – Admiral, Imperial Japanese Navy
- Ogasawara Nagamoto – House of Peers (1925).

== Ogasawara Islands (Bonin Islands) ==
The Ogasawara clan is linked to Japanese discovery of the Bonin Islands, and to Japan's claim over those islands which are now administratively considered part of metropolitan Tokyo:

- Bunroku 1 (1592): Ogasawara Sadayori claims to have discovered the Bonin Islands, and the territory was granted to him as a fief by Toyotomi Hideyoshi. These claims are later proven false and Ogasawara is exiled.
- Kanbun 10 (1670): The islands are discovered by the Japanese when a ship bound for Edo from Kyushu is blown off course by a storm.
- Enpō 3 (1675): The islands are explored by shogunate expedition, following up "discovery" in Kanbun 10. The islands are claimed as a territory of Japan.
- Bunkyū 1 (January 1862): The islands are re-confirmed as a territory of Japan, following "discovery" of the islands in Kanbun 10 (1670) and a shogunate expedition to the islands in Enpō 3 (1675).

== See also ==
- Tomono clan
- Hayashi Castle

== See also ==
- Ogasawara Nagakiyo
- Ogasawara Nagatsune
- Tomono clan
