= Ogasawara Nagakiyo =

Japanese samurai warlord (1162–1242)

Ogasawara Nagakiyo 小笠原長清
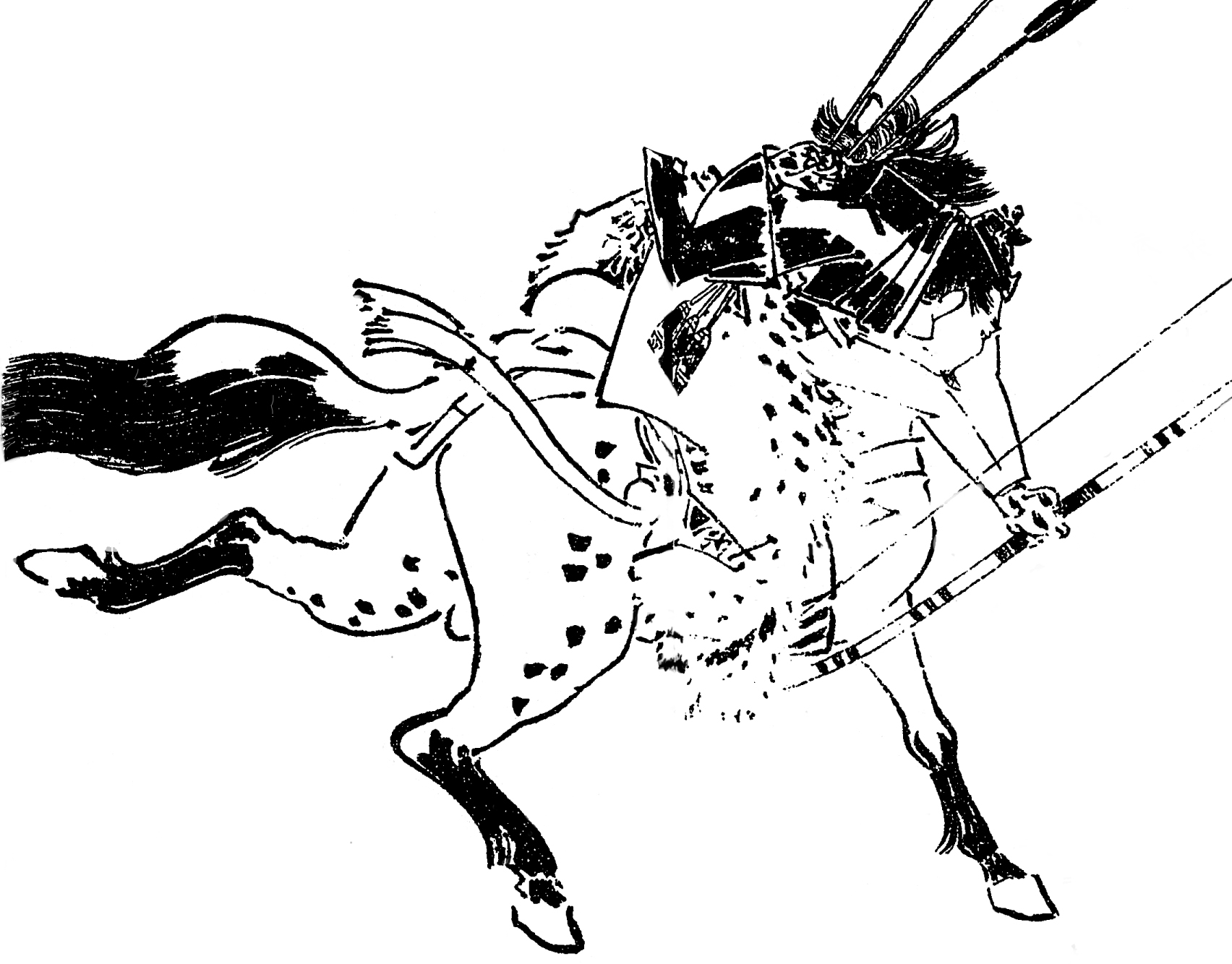
- Ogasawara Nagakiyo performing yabusame
- Born: March 5, 1162
- Died: July 15, 1242 (aged 80)
- Occupation: samurai warlord
- Children: Ogasawara Nagatsune; Tomono Tokinaga; Ōi Tomomitsu
- Father: Kagami Tōmitsu

Ogasawara Nagakiyo (小笠原 長清; March 5, 1162 – July 15, 1242) was a Japanese samurai warlord of the late Heian and early Kamakura period. He is best known as the founder of Ogasawara clan. The history of kyūdō (Japanese archery) begins with this martial arts master.

== Life ==
Nagakiyo was born on March 5, 1162, in Ogasawara, Koma, Kai Province (within present-day Hokuto, Yamanashi Prefecture) at the mansion of Ogasawa Manor as the second son of Kagami Tōmitsu. His father Tōmitsu served Emperor Takakura as an Inner Palace guard (takiguchi no musha). Nagakiyo was the grandson of Takeda Kiyomitsu (1110-1168), and the great-grandson of Minamoto no Yoshikiyo (1075-1149). His eldest brother, Mitsutomo, served the Taira clan and Kiso Yoshinaka, but Nagakiyo served Minamoto no Yoritomo and founded the Ogasawara clan.

In Azuma Kagami, Nagakiyo begins to call himself Ogasawara after 1184. However, until 1195, Kagami and Ogasawara are in mixed use. The name Ogasawara in Koma is known in two places in Yamanashi Prefecture. Nagakiyo's territory of Ogasawara was either the Hara-Ogasawara Manor in present-day Ogasawara, Minami-Alps, or the Yama-Ogasawara Manor in present-day Akeno, Hokuto. There was controversy among researchers as to which one of the two places Nagakiyo's territory of Ogasawara was located in it, but research on ancient documents suggests that the former (Yama-Ogasawara in present-day Akeno, Hokuto) is correct.

When Tōmitsu became the kokushi governor of Shinano Province, and Nagakiyo became the jitō (territory steward) of Tomono Manor in Shinano, Nagakiyo received a reminder of unpaid taxes from Emperor Go-Shirakawa through Minamoto no Yoritomo.

Nagakiyo became the dai-shogun (great general) of Tōsandō during the Jōkyū War in 1221, and fought against the kugyō (court nobles), who were against the shogunate. He defeated the kugyō forces in the territory of Inatsumi Manor, Osemura.

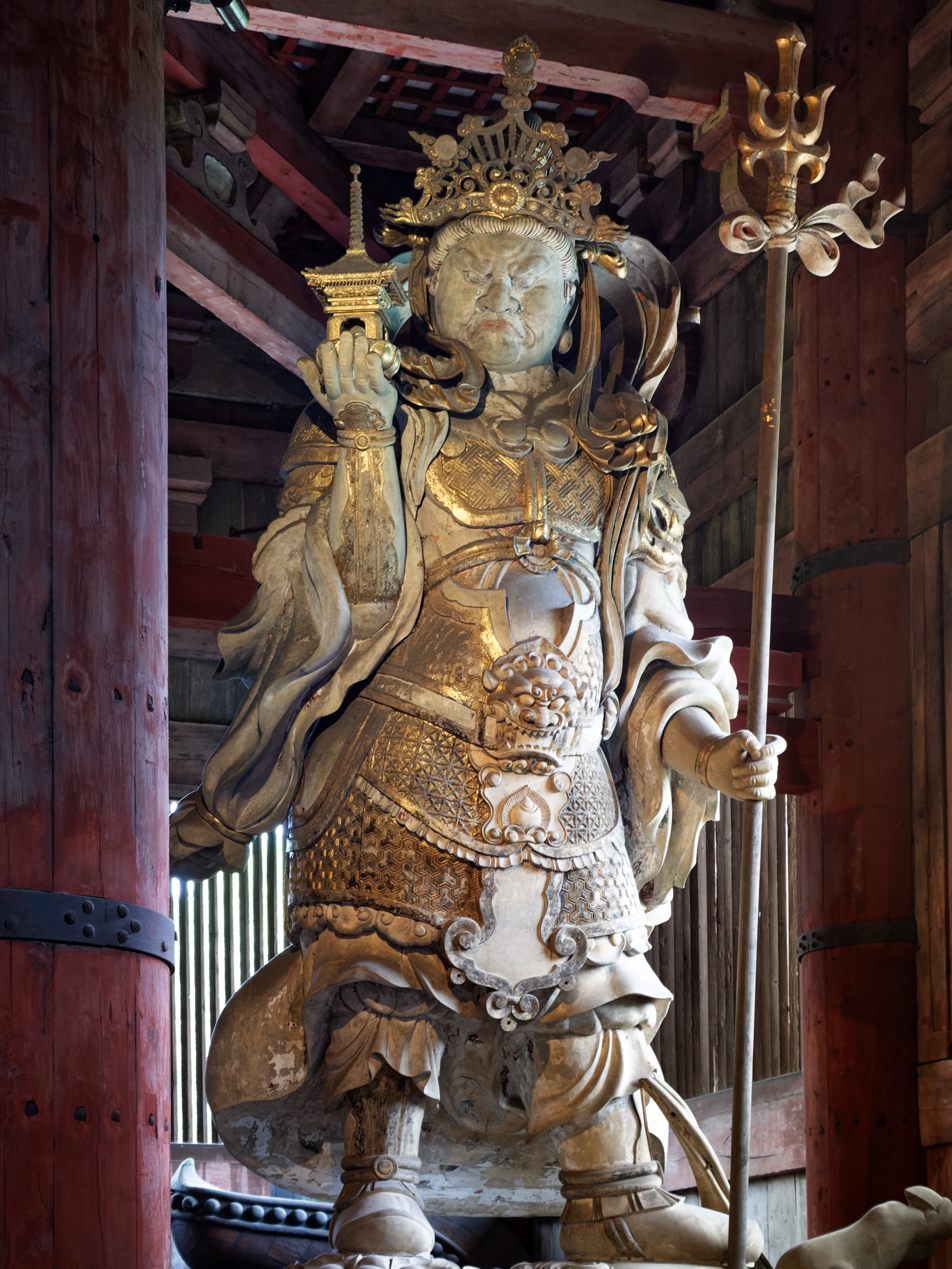
Tamonten statue at Tōdai-ji, Nara in which Nagakiyo led the construction with his vassals.

In 1194, when Minamoto no Yoritomo ordered his gokenin the gathering of timber and the creation of statues for the reconstruction of Tōdai-ji Temple, Nagakiyo was in charge of the Vaiśravaṇa statue.

In 1216, Nagakiyo asked Minamoto no Sanetomo permission for the construction of Yoritomo's Bodhi-devoted Goganji Temple, and was given permission.

Nagakiyo died on July 15, 1242, at the age of 81.

== Genealogy ==
The emblem (mon) of the Ogasawara clan

Nagakiyo's descendants laid the foundation for Shinano's Ogasawara clan centered in Banno Manor and Oi Manor, and the clan members came to be known as masters of horse-riding.

Nagakiyo's sixth generation descendant, Ogasawara Sadamune, founded the way of mounted archery, which became the family art. His archery school became known as Ogasawara-ryū.

== Family ==
- Father: Kagami Tōmitsu
- Mother: Sugimoto Yoshimune's daughter
- Siblings:
  - Brother: Akiyama Mitsutomo
  - Brother: Nanbu Mitsuyuki
  - Brother: Kagami Mitsutsune
  - Sister: Daini-no-tsubone
- First wife: Kazusa Hirotsune's daughter
- Second wife: Fujiwara no Kunitsuna's daughter
- Children:
  - Son: Ogasawara Nagatsune
  - Son: Tomono Tokinaga
  - Son: Ōi Tomomitsu

== Martial arts master ==
Nagakiyo was a martial arts tutor of Minamoto no Yoritomo.

During the Kamakura period, Nagakiyo's skills and training methods were passed on to his son, Ogasawara Nagatsune.

Nagakiyo was called the "Four Heavenly Kings of Archers and Horses" along with Takeda Nobumitsu, Yukiuji Unno, and Shigetaka Mochizuki, and tried to collect and systematize their skills and knowledge.
