= Ogasawara Sadamune =

Japanese noble (1294–1350)

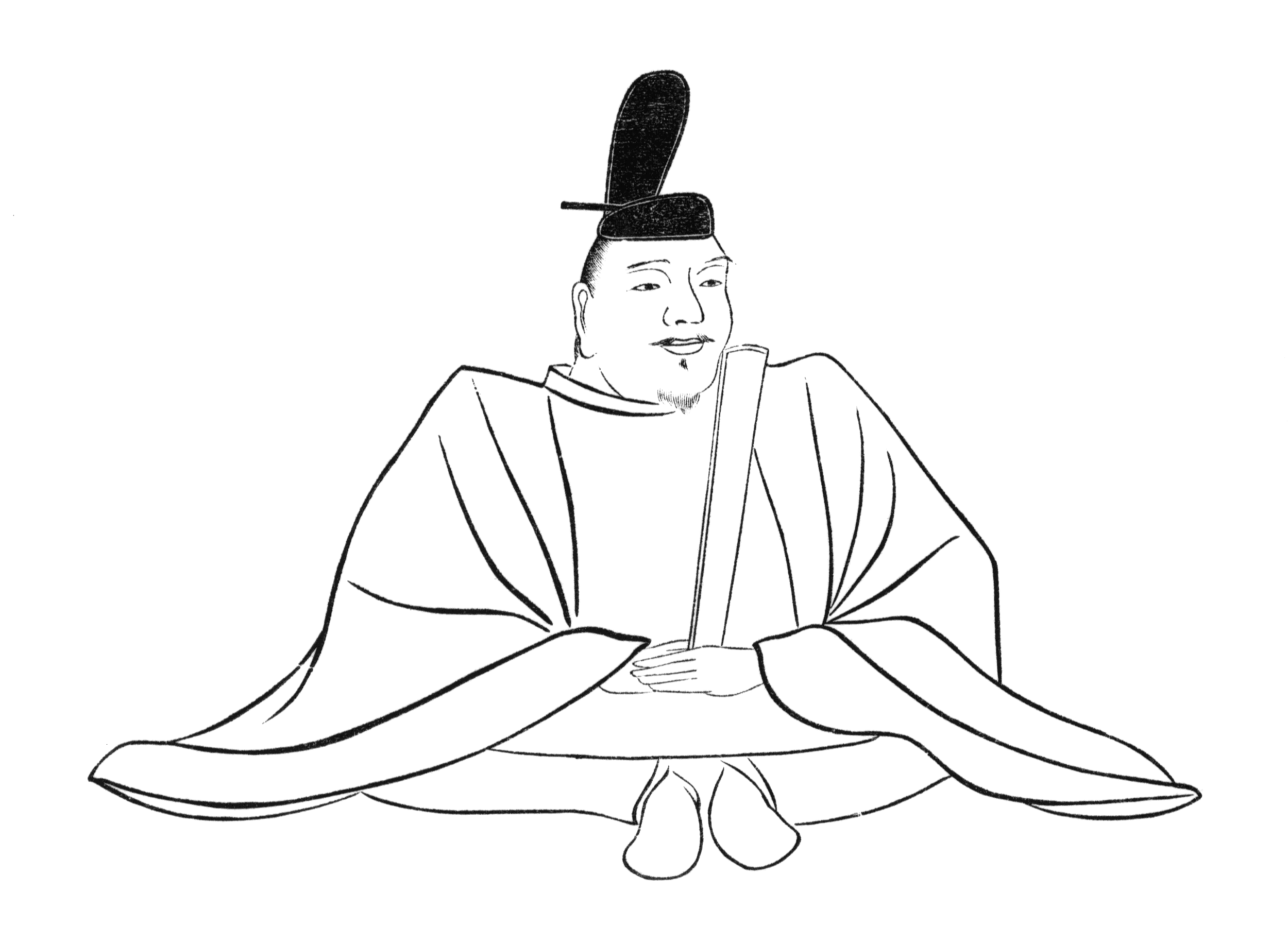
- Ogasawara Sadamune
- Native name: 小笠原貞宗
- Born: 30 April 1292
- Died: 5 July 1347 (aged 55)
- Noble family: Ogasawara clan
- Occupation: Nobleman

Ogasawara Sadamune (小笠原貞宗; 1292–1347) was a Japanese nobleman and a major figure in the formation of the Ogasawara-ryū.

A close ally of Ashikaga Takauji, Ogasawara was placed in charge of court etiquette. His approach to etiquette was influenced by Seisetsu Shōhō (Ch'ing-cho Cheng-ch'eng), with whom Ogasawara studied Zen Buddhism and Chinese literature.

Having inherited the headmastership of his family's school of kyujutsu and yabusame, he was archery instructor to both Takauji and Emperor Go-Daigo. He stressed the importance of inuoumono (dog-shooting) in archery practice, even writing a treatise (the Inuoumono mokuanbumi) on the subject. He also authored the Shinden kyūhō shūshinron, now regarded as a classic text on kyujutsu.

Despite having instructed Emperor Go-Daigo, Ogasawara sided with the Northern Court during the Nanboku-chō period, and was given control the province of Shinano. He was responsible for repelling Prince Muenaga from Kai.

== See also ==
- Ogasawara clan
