= Chōshizuka Kofun (Saga) =

- 銚子塚古墳 (Japanese)
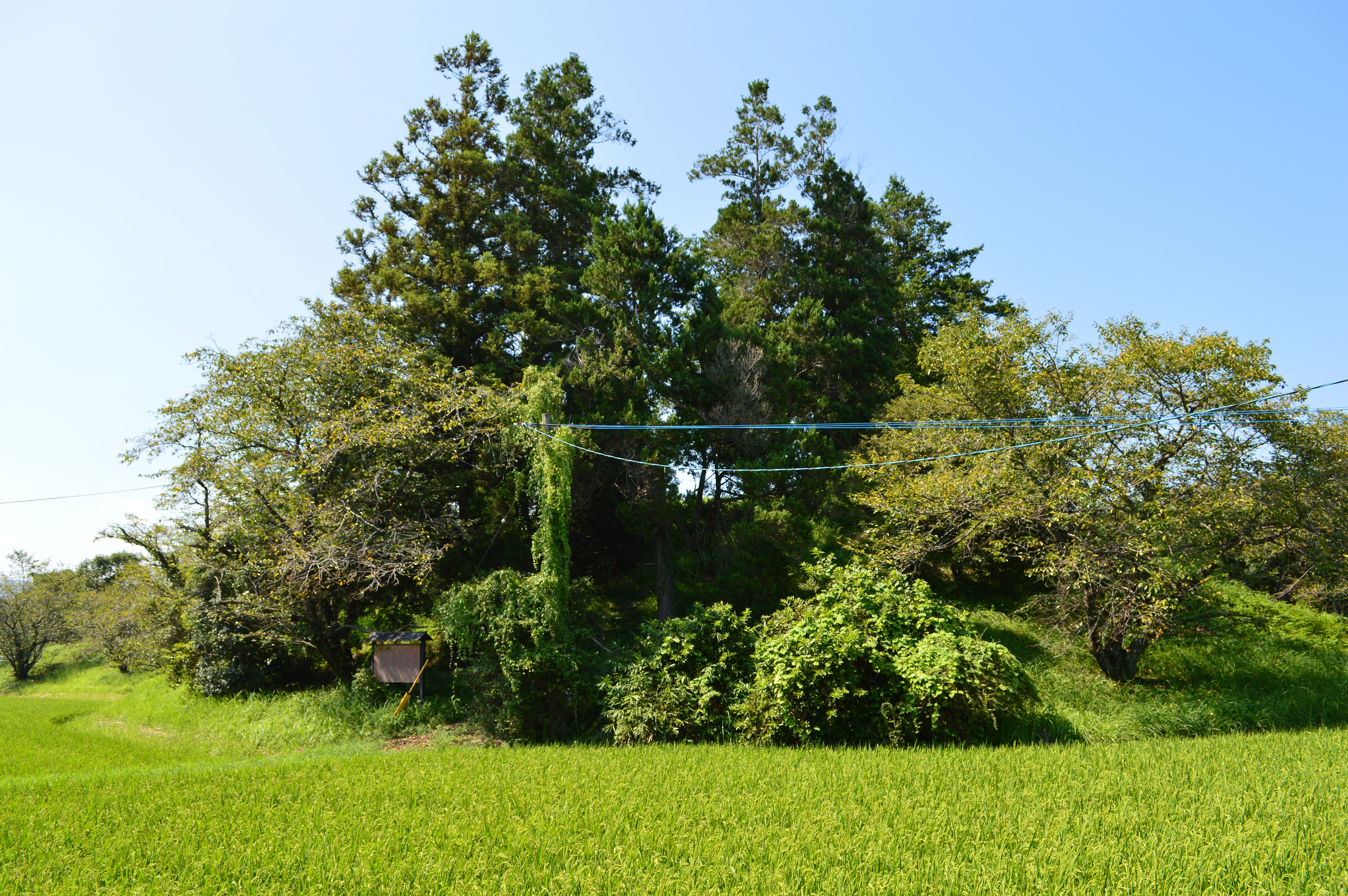
- Chōshizuka Kofun

- Chōshizuka Kofun Chōshizuka Kofun (Saga) (Japan)
- 33°19′4.33″N 130°17′59.4″E
- Type: Kofun
- Periods: Kofun period
- Location: Saga, Saga, Japan
- Region: Kyushu

History
- Built: c.4th - 5th century

Site notes
- Public access: Yes
- National Historic Site of Japan

The Chōshizuka Kofun (銚子塚古墳) is a Kofun period burial mound, located in the Kinryū-chō neighborhood of the city of Saga, Saga Prefecture Japan. The tumulus was designated a National Historic Site of Japan in 1978.

== Overview ==
The Chōshizuka Kofun is a zenpō-kōen-fun (前方後円墳) keyhole-shaped tomb built on flat land at the southern foot of Mt. Kinryū, a peak in the Sefuri mountain range in the northern part of the Saga Plain. The tumulus is large, with a total length of 98 meters and is orientated to the west. The surrounding area includes the presumed site of the Hizen Kokufu (Provincial Capital) and the remains of Hizen Kokubun-ji provincial temple. The posterior circular portion has a diameter of 58 meters and height of eight meters, and the rectangular anterior portion has a maximum width of 32 meters, and a height of 4.8 meters. A moat 16 to 28 meters wide surrounds the entire tumulus, the front part of which partially incorporates the valley topography. The mound is built in two tiers at the front and three at the rear mound, with fukiishi visible. No haniwa have been found, although several jar-shaped earthenware vessels have been collected on the slope connecting the two portions of the tumulus. These pot-shaped earthenware have a curved double rim, a vertical neck, a spherical body, a pointed base with perforations at the bottom that were made before firing, and are painted vermillion. These are old-style Haji ware pottery, very similar to that of a jar-shaped haniwa clay figures.

This tumulus was constructed in the late 4th to early 5th century, and is the second largest in Saga Prefecture. It has not been excavated, so details of the burial chamber and any surviving grave goods is uncertain.

The tumulus is 6.5 kilometers north of Saga Station on the JR Kyushu Nagasaki Main Line.

== See also ==
- List of Historic Sites of Japan (Saga)
