= List of historic sites of Japan (Saga) =

This list is of the historic sites of Japan located within the Prefecture of Saga.

== National Historic Sites ==
As of 1 August 2019, twenty-five Sites have been designated as being of national significance (including three *Special Historic Sites); Kii Castle spans the prefectural borders with Fukuoka.

Site	Municipality	Comments	Image	Coordinates	Type	Ref.
*Yoshinogari Site 吉野ヶ里遺跡; Yoshinogari iseki	Kanzaki, Yoshinogari	fortified Yayoi-period settlement, the subject of extensive excavation from 1986; 2500 burials with ICP grave goods have been uncovered; the site has been reconstructed on the basis of hypotheses drawn from the postholes; now a National Government Park		33°19′31″N 130°23′04″E	1	
*Nagoya Castle ruins 名護屋城跡並陣跡; Nagoya-jō ato narabainijin ato	Karatsu, Genkai	begun in 1591 and completed five months later; extends over 17 ha; stone walls, earthworks, moats, gates and other buildings have been identified; served as the base for Hideyoshi's invasions of Korea between 1592 and 1598; focus of the Saga Prefectural Nagoya Castle Museum		33°31′49″N 129°52′05″E	2	
*Kii Castle ruins 基肄(椽)城跡; Kii-jō ato	Kiyama	its construction in 665 under Baekje guidance, as the castle of Woyogi (椽), is chronicled in Nihon Shoki; formed part of a network of defences dating to the immediate aftermath of the Battle of Hakusukinoe in 663 to protect Dazaifu against the threat of invasion from the Korean peninsula by Silla-Tang forces; the designation includes an area of Chikushino in Fukuoka Prefecture		33°26′36″N 130°30′45″E	2	
Otsuboyama Kōgoishi おつぼ山神籠石; Otsuboyama kōgoishi	Takeo	earthworks stretching 1,866 m, with stone pillar bases and sluice gates; there is a theory that construction was related to defeat at the Battle of Hakusukinoe in 663		33°10′41″N 130°03′23″E	1	
Yasunagata Site 安永田遺跡; Yasunagata iseki	Tosu	Yayoi-period "high-tech factory" (ハイテク工場); bronze-casting site, discovered in 1974 and extending over an area of 4,400 m^{2}, with five moulds for dōtaku (bells) and five for hoko (spears); traces of bronze found on the valley floor suggest this may have been the site of the smelting works		33°23′55″N 130°30′52″E	1	
Yokotashimo Kofun 横田下古墳; Yokotashimo kofun	Karatsu	kofun or burial mound with red walls and three stone sarcophagi in which were found, in 1923, bronze mirrors and cylinders, magatama (comma-shaped beads), iron arrowheads, armour, and Haji ware		33°26′04″N 130°02′01″E	1	
Kakiemon Kiln Site 柿右衛門窯跡; Kakiemon kama ato	Arita	double climbing kiln: A, with 12 firing chambers, a length of 42 metres, and an average incline of 11.5°; and B, with 21 chambers, a length of 83 metres, and an average gradient of 13°; saggars and kiln tools have also been recovered		33°10′51″N 129°52′07″E	6	
Nabatake Site 菜畑遺跡; Nabatake iseki	Karatsu	acclaimed as Japan's first paddy; important for the understanding of the adoption of wet-rice technology, introduced from the continent; focus of the Matsurokan exhibition hall		33°26′55″N 129°57′28″E	1	
Mietsu Naval Dock Site 三重津海軍所跡; Mietsu kaigunsho ato	Saga	inscribed on the UNESCO World Heritage List as one of the Sites of Japan’s Meiji Industrial Revolution: Iron and Steel, Shipbuilding and Coal Mining		33°12′28″N 130°20′24″E	2	
Anegawa Castle ruins 姉川城跡; Anegawa-jō ato	Kanzaki	strategic site under Ryūzōji Takanobu but declined in importance after the unification of Kyūshū by Toyotomi Hideyoshi; the site extends 600 metres E-W and 800 N-S, with related mansions, temples and shrines, and a complex network of moats		33°17′35″N 130°20′54″E	2	
Katsunoo Castle Tsukushi Clan Sites 勝尾城筑紫氏遺跡; Katsuno-jō Tsukushi-shi iseki	Tosu	fortified at the end of the fifteenth century; attacked by the Shimazu clan in 1586 and later abandoned; excavations from 1995 have revealed an extensive site with moats, earthworks, mansions for retainers, temples and shrines		33°24′08″N 130°27′55″E	2	
Nishikuma Kofun 西隈古墳; Nishikuma kofun	Saga	C5 decorated kofun housing a large sarcophagus, with red pigmentation and incised decoration of triangles and circles		33°19′39″N 130°17′36″E	1	
Taku Seibyō 多久聖廟; Taku Seibyō	Taku	a Neo-Confucian school was established by Taku Shigefumi (多久茂文) in 1699; the ICP temple dates to 1708; major repairs at the end of the Shōwa period were completed in 1990		33°15′35″N 130°05′51″E	4	
Obukumayama Kōgoishi 帯隈山神籠石; Obukumayama kōgoishi	Saga	C7 fortifications discovered in 1941, that extend for 2.4 km and include a gate		33°20′01″N 130°20′04″E	1	
Ōkuma Shigenobu Former Residence 大隈重信旧宅; Ōkuma Shigenobu kyū-taku	Saga	birthplace in 1838 of the Meiji statesman and future prime minister; dismantled for repairs in 1968 and open to the public alongside the Ōkuma Memorial Museum (大隈記念館)		33°14′53″N 130°18′31″E	8	
Ōkawachi Nabeshima Kiln Site 大川内鍋島窯跡; Ōkawachi Nabeshima kama ato	Imari	the ceramic craft technique of Nabeshima iro (overglaze) is an Important Intangible Cultural Property		33°13′57″N 129°53′37″E	6	
Taniguchi Kofun 谷口古墳; Taniguchi kofun	Karatsu	seventy-seven metre, keyhole-shaped kofun with two stone chambers, boat-shaped sarcophagi, and grave goods that include mirrors, stone combs, items made of iron, and haji ware, dated to the end of the fourth century		33°27′10″N 130°03′16″E	1	
Chōshizuka Kofun 銚子塚古墳; Chōshizuka kofun	Saga	large early kofun, 98 metres long and dating to the second half of the fourth century		33°19′04″N 130°17′58″E	1	
Tashiroōta Kofun 田代太田古墳; Tashiroōta kofun	Tosu	triple-chambered, 42 metre decorated kofun with red ochre, carbon black and green earth paintings of triangles, concentric circles, boats, humans with outstretched arms, and figures on horseback, concentrated on the rear wall of the burial chamber		33°23′42″N 130°30′55″E	1	
Habu Site 土生遺跡; Habu iseki	Ogi	Yayoi settlement discovered in 1971 during works to remedy environmental damage caused by mining; evidence uncovered of houses (some now reconstructed), storage pits, and wells, along with the first mould for a yari ganna (spear-plane), tools of stone and wood, and ceramics		33°16′33″N 130°12′02″E	1	
Karatsu Matsuura Tomb Sites 唐津松浦墳墓群; Karatsu Matsuura funbo-gun	Karatsu	designation includes the Hayamajiri Dolmen Cluster (葉山尻支石墓群) (Jōmon-period cemetery discovered in 1951 and excavated in 1952/3; six dolmens, twenty-six jar burials, and one kofun identified), Ōdomo Site (大友遺跡), Moritashi Dolmen Cluster (森田支石墓群), and Sakura no Baba Site (桜馬場遺跡)		33°24′37″N 130°01′18″E	1	
Higashimyō Site 東名遺跡; Higashimyō iseki	Saga	Jōmon period settlement and shell midden site		33°15′48″N 130°18′03″E	1	
Hizen Provincial Headquarters ruins 肥前国庁跡; Bizen koku-chō ato	Saga	ruins of the Nara- and early Heian-period administrative centre of Hizen Province, extending 105 metres N-S and 77 metres E-W, with similarities to Dazaifu		33°19′01″N 130°16′26″E	2	
Hizen Porcelain Kiln Sites 肥前磁器窯跡; Bizen-jiki kama ato	Arita, Takeo, Ureshino	designation includes the Tengudani Kiln Site (天狗谷窯跡), Yamabeta Kiln Site (山辺田窯跡), Haraake Kiln Site (原明窯跡), Hyakken Kiln Site (百間窯跡), Fudōyama Kiln Site (不動山窯跡), and the site of the Izumiyama Clayworks (泉山磁石場跡)		33°11′39″N 129°54′36″E	6	
Hizen Pottery Kiln Sites 肥前陶器窯跡; Bizen-tōki kama ato	Takeo, Karatsu, Taku	active from the late C16/early C17		33°14′08″N 129°59′07″E	6	

== Prefectural Historic Sites ==
As of 1 August 2019, forty-seven Sites have been designated as being of prefectural importance.

Site	Municipality	Comments	Image	Coordinates	Type	Ref.
Funazuka 船塚; Funazuka	Saga			33°18′48″N 130°14′29″E		
Isezuka 伊勢塚; Isezuka	Kanzaki			33°20′48″N 130°22′52″E		
Udono Stone Buddhas 鵜殿石仏群; Udono sekibutsu-gun	Karatsu			33°20′55″N 130°00′08″E		
Daiganji Haiji Site 大願寺廃寺跡; Daiganji Haiji ato	Saga			33°19′01″N 130°15′05″E		
Teraura Haiji Pagoda Site and Foundation Stones 寺浦廃寺塔跡ならびに礎石; Teraura Haiji tō ato narabini soseki	Ogi			33°17′56″N 130°10′53″E		
Sekigyōmaru Kofun 関行丸古墳; Sekigyōmaru kofun	Saga			33°19′53″N 130°19′40″E		
Shimadazuka 島田塚; Shimadazuka	Karatsu			33°26′02″N 130°00′45″E		
Itō Genboku Former Residence 伊東玄朴旧宅; Itō Genboku kyūtaku	Kanzaki			33°21′22″N 130°21′51″E		
Himekata Site 姫方遺跡（雌塚、方形周溝墓、環状列石土壙墓） Himekata iseki (Mezuka, hōkeishū-kōbo, retsujō resseki dokōbo)	Miyaki	three burials are preserved, one with a stone circle		33°21′07″N 130°26′44″E		
Tsurugizuka 剣塚; Tsurugizuka	Tosu			33°23′57″N 130°31′26″E		
Koshindōzuka 庚申堂塚; Koshindōzuka	Tosu			33°23′45″N 130°30′47″E		
Kojima Kofun 小島古墳; Kojima kofun	Imari			33°19′21″N 129°48′50″E		
Himezuka 姫塚; Himezuka	Ogi			33°18′33″N 130°13′53″E		
Ryūōzaki Kofun Cluster 龍王崎古墳群; Ryūōzaki kofun-gun	Shiroishi			33°08′13″N 130°07′15″E		
Onizuka 鬼塚; Onizuka	Kashima			33°05′51″N 130°06′00″E		
Hoshirō Kiln Site 保四郎窯跡; Hoshirō kama ato	Taku			33°15′42″N 130°05′21″E		
Shiomi Kofun 潮見古墳; Shiomi kofun	Takeo			33°10′28″N 130°02′42″E		
Yanoura Kofun 矢ノ浦古墳; Yanoura kofun	Takeo			33°11′28″N 130°01′53″E		
Tsutsue Kiln Site 筒江窯跡; Tsutsue kama ato	Takeo			33°13′24″N 129°55′12″E		
Futatsukayama-Gohondani Site 二塚山五本谷遺跡; Futatsukayama-Gohondani iseki	Kamimine			33°20′40″N 130°25′10″E		
Shirohebiyamaiwa Site 白蛇山岩陰遺跡; Shirohebiyamaiwa iseki	Imari			33°16′18″N 129°50′12″E		
Funaishi Site 船石遺跡; Funaishi iseki	Kamimine			33°20′32″N 130°25′35″E		
Kodaru No.2 Kiln Site 小樽2号窯跡; Kodaru nigō kama ato	Arita			33°11′21″N 129°54′20″E		
Kayanotani No.1 Kiln Site 茅ノ谷1号窯跡; Kayanotani ichigō kama ato	Imari			33°16′17″N 129°56′12″E		
Akasaka Kofun 赤坂古墳; Akasaka kofun	Tosu			33°24′01″N 130°31′31″E		
Himekata Keyhole Mound 姫方前方後円墳; Himekata zenpōkōen-fun	Miyaki			33°20′53″N 130°26′54″E		
Tamashima Kofun 玉島古墳; Tamashima kofun	Takeo			33°10′02″N 130°03′17″E		
Tsutsumi Earthworks 堤土塁跡; Tsutsumi dorui ato	Kamimine			33°20′50″N 130°25′24″E		
Shishiga Castle Site 獅子城跡; Shishiga-jō ato	Karatsu			33°18′44″N 130°02′30″E		
Chasenzuka Kofun 茶筅塚古墳; Chasenzuka kofun	Ogi			33°17′26″N 130°11′45″E		
Takayanagi Ōtsuka 高柳大塚; Takayanagi ōtsuka	Miyaki			33°21′28″N 130°25′50″E		
Gongenyama Keyhole Mound and No.2 Mound 権現山前方後円墳及び2号墳（円墳） Gongenyama zenpōkōen-fun oyobi nigō-fun (en-fun)	Ogi			33°18′20″N 130°13′09″E		
Maruyama Kofun 円山古墳; Maruyama kofun	Ogi			33°18′19″N 130°13′22″E		
Taijako Kofun 多蛇古古墳（1号墳） Taijako kofun (ichigō-fun)	Takeo			33°12′19″N 130°01′43″E		
Tsumayama Kofun Cluster No.4 Mound 妻山古墳群4号墳; Tsumayama kofun-gun yongō-fun	Shiroishi	decorated kofun		33°11′16″N 130°05′52″E		
Yoshinogari Site 吉野ヶ里遺跡; Yoshinogari iseki	Kanzaki	area surrounding the Special Historic Site		33°19′19″N 130°22′53″E		
Kishitake Castle Site 岸岳城跡; Kishitake-jō ato	Karatsu			33°21′24″N 129°58′40″E		
Kogumayama Kofun 小隈山古墳; Kogumayama kofun	Saga			33°19′11″N 130°15′21″E		
Sayantani Kofun 道祖谷古墳; Sayantani kofun	Shiroishi			33°10′45″N 130°04′42″E		
Takashi Jinja Site 高志神社遺跡; Takashi Jinja iseki	Kanzaki			33°16′59″N 130°23′14″E		
Chirikudoi 千栗土居; Chirikudoi	Miyaki			33°19′32″N 130°28′32″E		
Saga Castle Site 佐賀城跡; Saga-jō ato	Saga			33°14′43″N 130°18′08″E		
Hisagozuka Kofun 瓢塚古墳; Hisagozuka kofun	Karatsu			33°33′49″N 129°53′06″E		
Kishidake Old Kiln Site 岸岳古窯跡 （道納屋窯跡） Kishidake koyō ato (Michinaya kama ato)	Karatsu			33°21′28″N 129°58′13″E		
Nita Haniwa Kiln Site 仁田埴輪窯跡; Nita haniwa kama ato	Karatsu			33°27′21″N 130°03′00″E		
Kurisōzui Kofun 久里双水古墳; Kurisōzui kofun	Karatsu			33°23′49″N 129°59′11″E		

== Municipal Historic Sites ==
As of 1 May 2018, a further eighty-one Sites have been designated as being of municipal importance.

== See also ==
- Cultural Properties of Japan
- Hizen Province
- Saga Domain
- Saga Prefectural Museum
- List of Cultural Properties of Japan - paintings (Saga)
- List of Places of Scenic Beauty of Japan (Saga)
