= Yokotashimo Kofun =

- 横田下古墳 (Japanese)
- Yokotashimo Kofun Yokotashimo Kofun (Japan)
- Interactive map of Yokotashimo Kofun
- 33°26′04″N 130°02′01″E
- Type: Kofun
- Periods: Kofun period
- Location: Karatsu, Saga, Japan
- Region: Kyushu

History
- Built: c.4th century

Site notes
- Public access: Yes

The Yokotashimo Kofun (横田下古墳) is a Kofun period burial mound, located in the Hamatama neighborhood of the city of Karatsu, Saga Prefecture Japan. The tumulus was designated a National Historic Site of Japan in 1951.

== Overview ==
The Yokotashimo Kofun is an enpun (円墳)-style circular burial mound, with an estimated diameter of about 30 meters, located on a hill about 60 meters above sea level at the eastern foot of Mount Kagamiyama, which is located almost in the center of the Karatsu Plain facing Karatsu Bay. It was discovered in 1924 when the owner of the land dug up the passage to the stone chamber while clearing a forest, and discovered the grave goods when he opened the sarcophagus inside. The horizontal-type stone burial chamber opens to the south and is divided into a passageway and a rear chamber. The rear chamber is about 4 meters long, 2.25 meters wide and 2.34 meters high and gradually narrows towards the top, reaching a ceiling on consisting of three huge stones. It was constructed using broken basalt stones and granite, and the entire wall is painted with red pigment. Part of the western wall of the passageway has been destroyed, but what is thought to be the gate remains in its original state and is blocked by a single slab of stone. Inside the burial chamber are three stone sarcophagi made of flat slabs, with the first stone sarcophagus adjacent to the back wall having a cover stone, and the stone on the south side forming the northern wall of the second stone sarcophagus which is parallel to it, and the third stone sarcophagus placed separately, parallel to the western wall of the antechamber. Grave goods include a round and a square bronze mirror, magatama in the first sarcophagus, cylindrical copperware, iron arrowheads, and a short armor in the second sarcophagus, and Haji ware pottery in the third sarcophagus, as well as the bones of eight people. The burial mound is of a common form, but the style of the burial chamber and layout of the stone coffins is unique in kofun which have been excavated to date. The grave goods designated are a Saga Prefectural Tangible Cultural Property.

The tumulus is about a 25-minute walk from Hamasaki Station on the JR Kyushu Chikuhi Line.

== See also ==
- List of Historic Sites of Japan (Saga)
