= Obukumayama Kōgoishi =

Castle ruins in Saga, Japan

- 帯隈山神籠石
- Saga (city), Japan
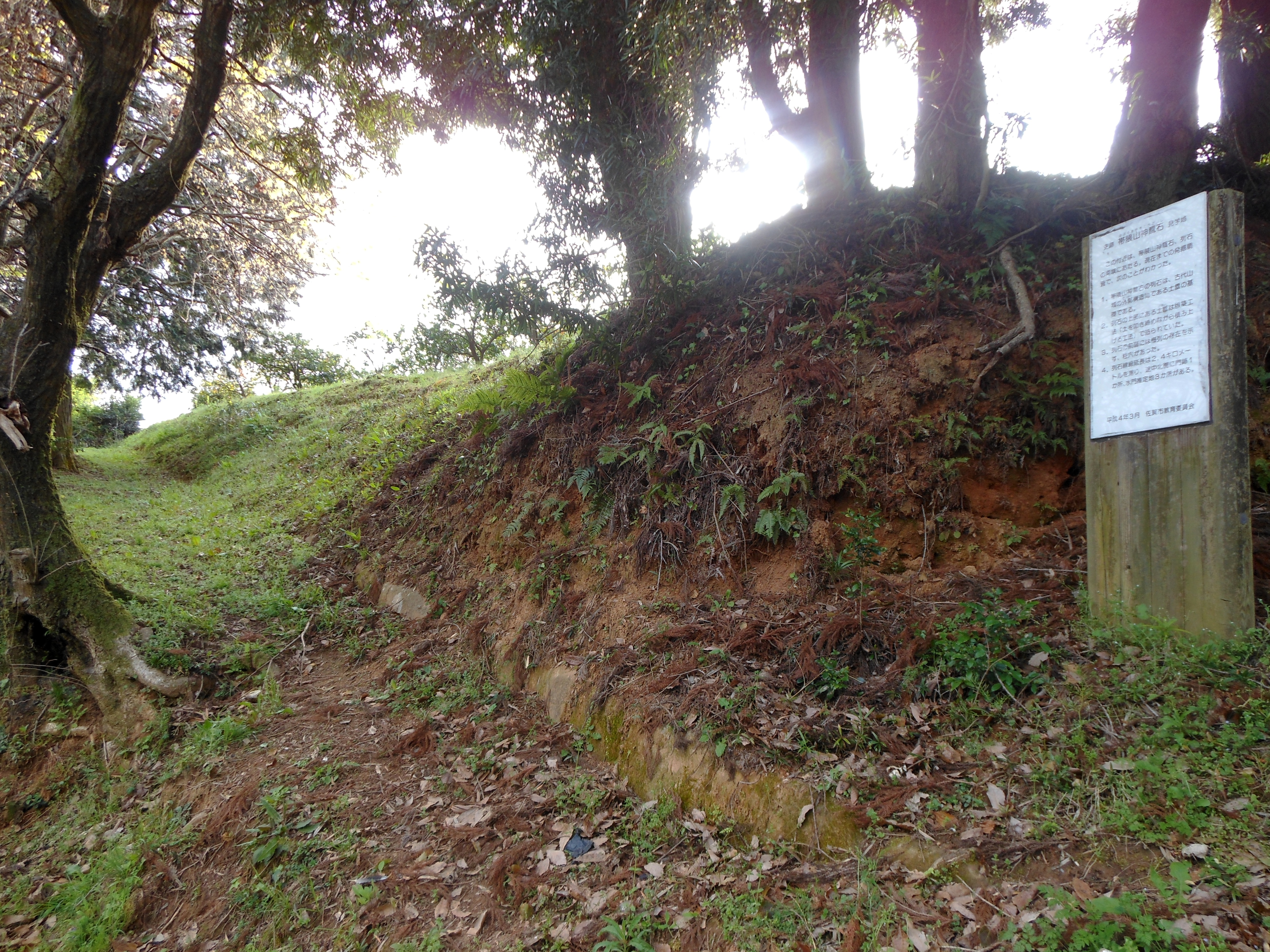
- Remnant of stone wall at Obukumayama Kōgoishi

Site information
- Type: Korean-style fortress
- Condition: ruins

Site history
- Built: Asuka period
- Built by: Yamato court
- Obukumayama Kōgoishi (Fukuoka Prefecture) Obukumayama Kōgoishi (Japan) National Historic Site of Japan

Obukumayama Kōgoishi (帯隈山神籠石) was an ancient Korean-style fortress located in the Kuboizumimachi neighborhood of Saga, Saga Prefecture, Japan. Its ruins have been protected as a National Historic Site since 1951.

== History ==
After the defeat of the combined Baekje and Yamato Japan forces, at the hands of the Silla and Tang China alliance at the Battle of Hakusukinoe in 663, the Yamato court feared an invasion from either or both Tang or Silla. In response, a huge network of shore fortifications was constructed throughout the rest of the 600s, often with the assistance of Baekje engineers, generals and artisans. Unaware of the outbreak of the Silla-Tang War (670–676), the Japanese would continue to build fortifications until 701, even after finding out that Silla was no longer friendly with Tang. The name "kōgoishi" means "stones of divine protection," a name given them by the Meiji period archaeologist Tsuboi Shōgorō, who conjectured that they served as spiritual or practical protection for sacred sites. Scholars after Tsuboi determined that the structures are most likely the remains of practical, military fortifications, and were unlikely to have significant spiritual connections, although much remains unknown about these structures and there is very little contemporary documentary evidence.

Obukumayama Castle is located around Mount Obikuma, 177.3 meters above sea level, south of the Sefuri mountain range, which runs from east to west, north of the Saga Plain. It was discovered in 1941. The fortifications span three valleys, with a total length of about 2,400 meters. The stone rows are made of cut granite stones about 60-centimeters high, and although there are missing portions, the line of the stone rows can be traced for the most part. There is a flat area in the north, and remains that are thought to be the remains of a gate. In the southwestern valley, there is a site that is thought to be a water gate.

Archaeological excavations were conducted in 1964, and have revealed that the rows of stones are the foundations of an earthwork, with a 2-3 meter high earthwork built using tamped earth behind them and wooden fences erected at approximately 3 meter intervals on the flat area in front of the stone wall. No traces of buildings have been found within the enclosed area.

The site is approximately 18 minutes by car from Kanzaki Station on the JR Kyushu Nagasaki Main Line.

== See also ==
- List of Historic Sites of Japan (Saga)
- List of foreign-style castles in Japan
- Kōgoishi

== Literature ==
- De Lange, William (2021). An Encyclopedia of Japanese Castles. Groningen: Toyo Press. pp. 600 pages. ISBN 978-9492722300.
