= Nishikuma Kofun =

- 西隈古墳 (Japanese)
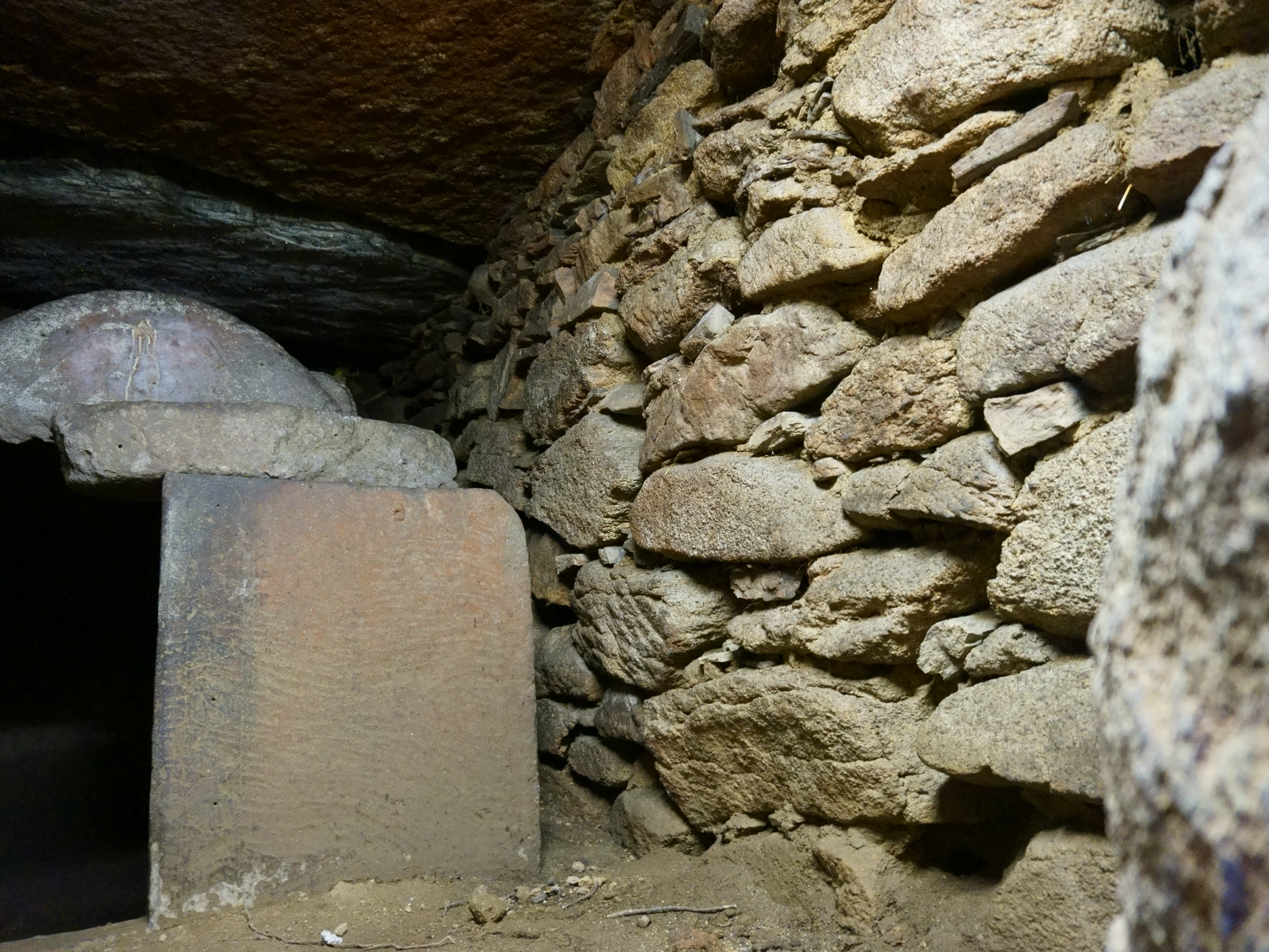
- Nishikuma Kofun

- Nishikuma Kofun Nishikuma Kofun (Japan)
- Interactive map of Nishikuma Kofun
- 33°19′39″N 130°17′36″E
- Type: Kofun
- Periods: Kofun period
- Location: Saga, Saga, Japan
- Region: Kyushu

History
- Built: c.5th century

Site notes
- Public access: Yes

The Nishikuma Kofun (西隈古墳) is a Kofun period burial mound, located in the Kinryumachi neighborhood of the city of Saga, Saga Prefecture Japan. The tumulus was designated a National Historic Site of Japan in 1975.

== Overview ==
The Nishikuma Kofun is located on a plateau at the southern foot of the Sefuri mountain range, in the northern part of the Saga Plain. It is a two-tiered circular enpun (円墳)-style tumulus with a diameter of about 30 meters and a height of about four meters, built in two tiers, and the presence of fukiishi and figurative and cylindrical haniwa has been confirmed. The surrounding area of the tumulus has been eroded by urban encroachment and farmland.The horizontal-type stone burial chamber is orientated to the west. The burial chamber is 3.3 meters long, 1.5 meters wide, and 17 meters high, and the surrounding walls are topped with a waist stone at the base, with slightly flattened blocks of stone piled on top of that. Outside the entrance, there is a vestibule side wall that is 2.8 meters long and 1.1 to 1.4 meters wide. All of the stones used are granite, and the interior of the burial chamber is painted with vermilion pigment. The stone sarcophagus inside the burial chamber is made of tuff from Mount Aso, and is placed in the direction of the chamber's main axis. It is 2 meters long, 1.1 meters wide, and 1.3 meters high, and is made of four stone slabs combined, with no bottom stone.The sarcophagus lid has a hipped roof, and there are two ring-shaped rope hanging protrusions on each of its long sides. The edges of the sarcophagus body and lid facing the entrance are engraved with circular and consecutive triangular patterns that leave compass marks, and the parts other than the patterns are painted with vermillion pigment. This tomb had previously been the victim of grave robbery, and only a few grave goods such as armor fragments and iron arrowheads have been excavated. However, judging from the structure of the burial chamber and sarcophagus, it is estimated to have been built around the end of the 5th century.

The tumulus is approximately 8.2 kilometers north of Saga Station on the JR Kyushu Nagasaki Main Line.

== See also ==
- List of Historic Sites of Japan (Saga)
- Decorated kofun
