= Tashiroōta Kofun =

- 田代太田古墳 (Japanese)
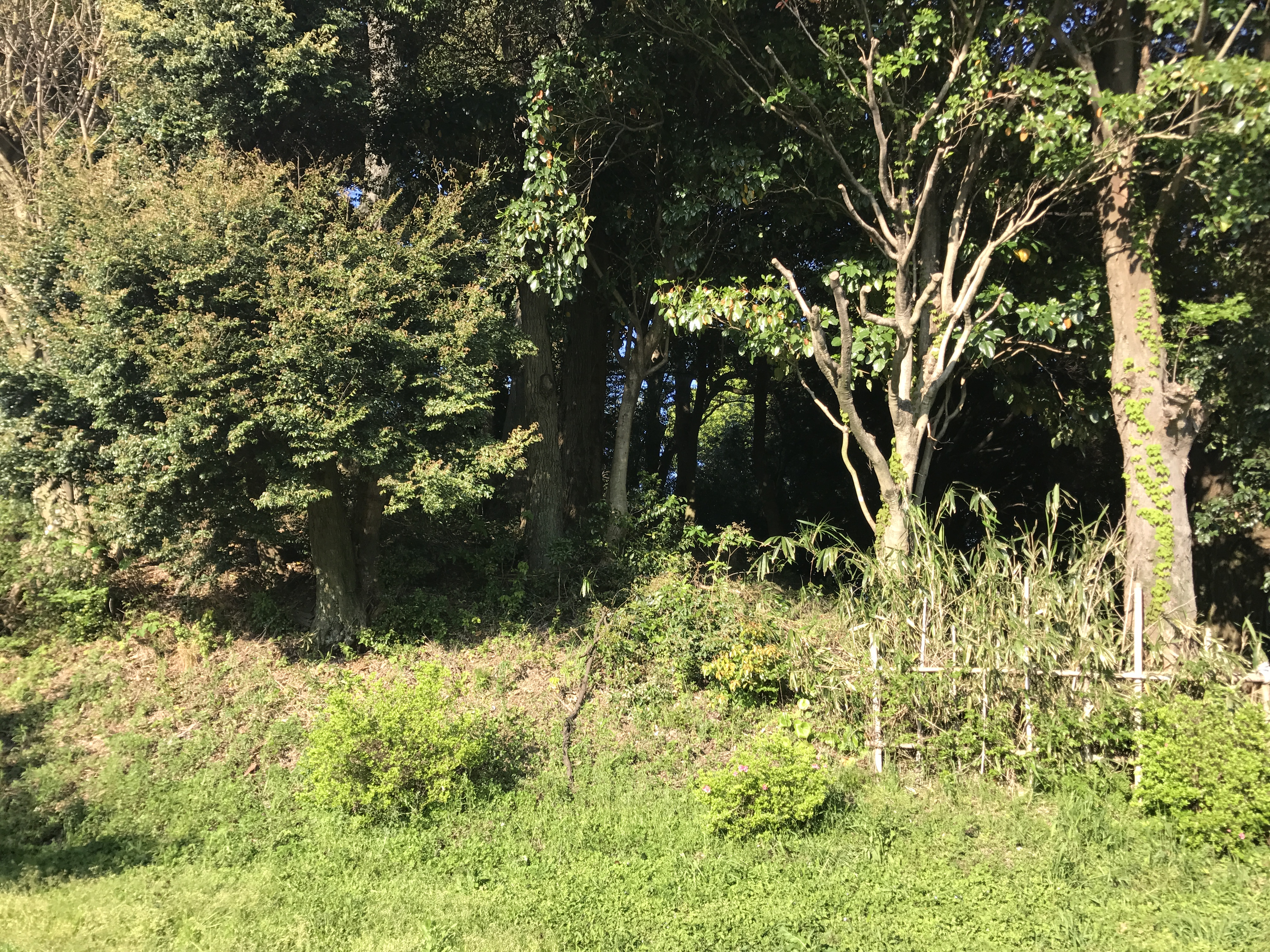
- Tashiroōta Kofun

- Tashiroōta Kofun Tashiroōta Kofun (Japan)
- Interactive map of Tashiroōta Kofun
- 33°23′41.3″N 130°30′54.6″E
- Type: Kofun
- Periods: Kofun period
- Location: Tosu, Saga, Japan
- Region: Kyushu

History
- Built: c.6th century

Site notes
- Public access: Yes

The Tashiroōta Kofun (田代太田古墳) is a Kofun period burial mound, located in the Tashirohonmachi neighborhood of the city of Tosu, Saga Prefecture Japan. The tumulus was designated a National Historic Site of Japan in 1926. Because the burial mound is located on the grounds of a private house, and there are preservation issues, it is closed to the public except for a special exhibition held once a year.

== Overview ==
The Tashiroōta Kofun is located on a hill between the Oki River and the Yamashita River, about 51 meters above sea level. The hill extends southeast from the 312.3 meter Shashigamine, which is a tributary peak of the Sefuri Mountains. It is a round enpun (円墳)-style tumulus with a dimater of 42-meters and a height of six meters, constructed in two tiers. However, due to urban encroachment, part of the tumulus was destroyed, so much remains unknown regarding its form and scale. In the surrounding area are many zenpō-kōen-fun (前方後円墳) keyhole-shaped tumuli.

A fragment of a cylindrical haniwa has been found on the tumulus. The burial chamber is a horizontal entry structure, consisting of a front chamber, a middle chamber, and a rear chamber, orientated to the south. It has a length of approximately nine meters, and contains corpse beds for three bodies in the rear chamber and two bodies in the middle chamber. X-ray fluorescence analysis has revealed that the deceased were laid down without using wooden coffins. The front chamber appears to have originally been a passageway, but was modified at some unknown time. It has a flat ceiling, whereas the middle and rear chambers have a high, dome-shaped ceiling.

The 2.3 meter wide and 1.1 meter high waist stone on the back wall of the burial chamber and the wall on the right side of the middle chamber are decorated with continuous triangular patterns, using the three colors of red, black, and green on the granite rock surface. The drawings also depict people, ships, shields, takatsuki (tall cups), bracken (warabi) patterns, concentric circles, and flowers. Grave goods included beads, pieces of iron arrowheads, pieces of horse harnesses, shards of Sue ware, and Haji ware. From these artifacts, it is estimated that the tumulus was built in the latter half of the 6th century.

From Tosu Station on the JR Kagoshima Main Line, get off at Nishitetsu Bus "Tashiro Koen Iriguchi" and walk 5 minutes.

== See also ==
- List of Historic Sites of Japan (Saga)
- Decorated kofun
