= Katsunoo Castle =

Castle ruins in Tosu, Saga, Japan

- 勝尾城
- Tosu, Saga Japan
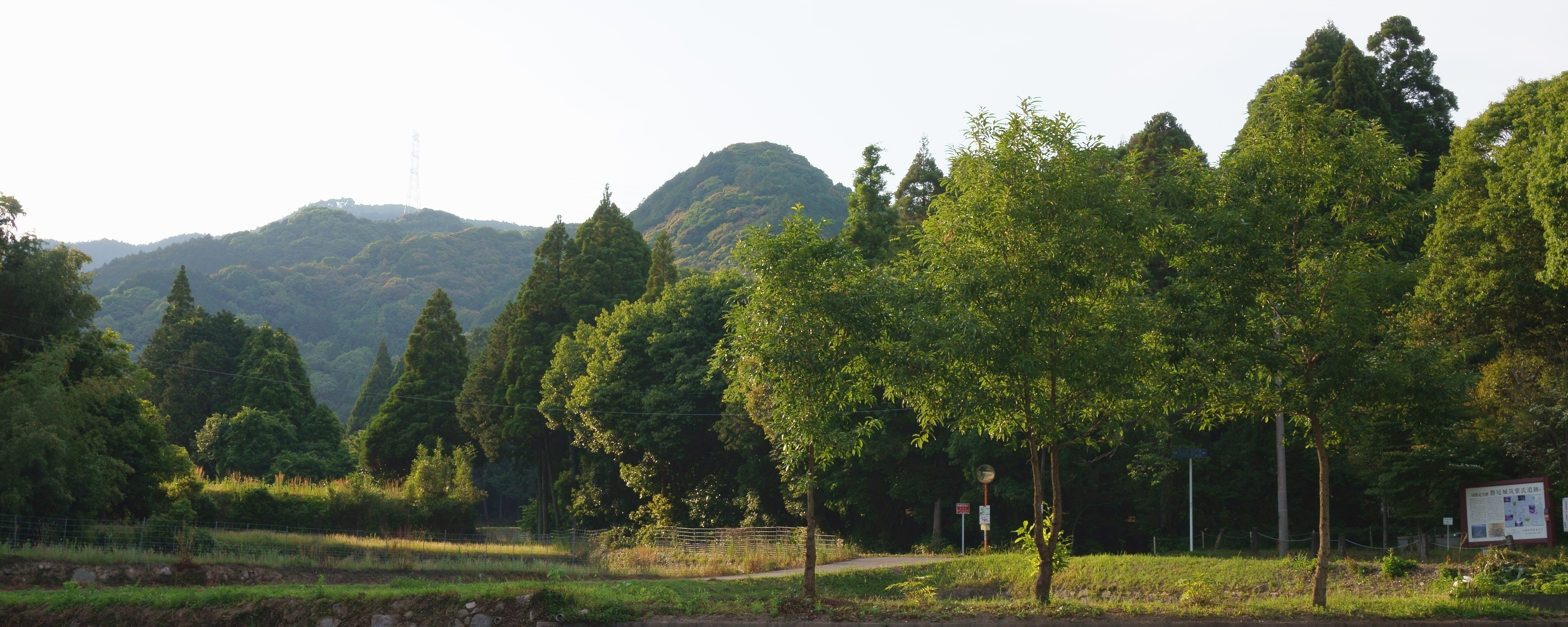
- Katsunoo Castle from below

Site information
- Type: yamajiro-style Japanese castle
- Controlled by: Tsukushi clan
- Open to the public: yes
- Condition: Archaeological and designated national historical site; castle ruins

Location
- Coordinates: 33°24′07.4″N 130°27′54.2″E

Site history
- Built: c.1423
- In use: Muromachi to Sengoku period
- National Historic Site of Japan

Katsunoo Castle (勝尾城, Katsuno'o-jō) was a Muromachi to Sengoku period yamajiro-style Japanese castle located in the city of Tosu, Saga Prefecture, Japan. Its ruins have been protected as a National Historic Site since 2006, with the designation expanded in 2010 to become the collective designation Katsuno'o Castle Tsukushi clan ruins (勝尾城筑紫氏遺跡, Katsuno-jō Tsukushi-shi iseki), which includes the ruins of Oniga Castle (鬼ヶ城), Takatori Castle (高取城), Katsurago Castle (葛籠城), Kagami Castle (鏡城), Wakayama Fort (若山砦等), the remains of the clan's head residence, the remains of the vassals' houses, the remains of temples and shrines, and the remains of town houses.

== Overview ==
Katsunoo Castle is located on the top of Mount Shiroyama at an elevation of 501.3 meters It is a sandwiched between the valley of the Ara River and its tributary, the Shioya River. This area was a key transportation point bordering Hizen, Chikuzen and Chikugo Provinces. Per the "Hizen Kokushi" (肥前国史) Shibukawa Yoshitoshi constructed a castle at this site in 1423, but the "Rekidai Chinzei Yoraku" (代鎮西要略) states that it was built by Shibukawa Yoshimoto in 1491. As he castle is located at the crossroads of north–south and east–west traffic in Kyushu, it was a battleground between the Shibukawa and Shōni clans for a long time. Eventually, the Shōni clan, with the assistance of the Ōuchi clan defeated the Shibukawa, and in 1521 appointed a cadet member of the clan, Tsukushi Mitsukado, as castellan.

In 1586, the Shimazu clan, which had swept across southern Kyushu, began their invasion of Chikuzen Province. Although the Tsukushi clan had cooperated with the Shimazu clan two years before, they had surrendered to the Ōtomo clan just before the Shimazu invasion, making Katsunoo Castle, a strategic target in the Shimazu's plans to conqueror Chikuzen. The castle was attacked by Shimazu Tadanaga, and the main fortress at the foot of the mountain was broken on July 6 of the same year, and the castle fell on July 11. The lord of the castle, Tsukushi Hirokado, surrendered and was temporarily imprisoned at the temple of Daizen-ji in Chikugo, but in August of the same year, he raised an army and recaptured Katsunoo Castle. Afterwards, the castle was abandoned after Toyotomi Hideyoshi relocated the Tsukushi clan to an 18,000 koku domain in Kamitsuma County, Chikugo Province.

In 1988 and from 1995 to 2004, archaeological excavations confirmed that the castle site extended over an area of approximately 400 meters east-to-west and 600 meters north-to-south. The mountaintop is the main enclosure, and stone walls are built around it throughout the castle grounds. In particular, the remains of the former Ninomaru on the east side has a continuous stone wall made of small piled stones, and a compound gate with an inner square. In addition, the Aragawa River, its tributary, the Shiaya River, and the surrounding mountains were incorporated in the outlying fortifications, with a fortified castle town in the valley, with vassal residences, temples, shrines, and town houses, and each was divided by a long moat and earthen ramparts. Smaller castles and forts were built on the surrounding mountains, and the ridges were used as a defense line. These structures are similar to those of the Ichijōdani Asakura Family Historic Ruins in structure and size. Excavations have unearthed a large number of artifacts, including imported and domestic ceramics, roof tiles, Haji ware, and Chinese coins.

The castle sites are located approximately four kilometers north-northwest from Shin-Tosu Station on the Kyushu Shinkansen.

== See also ==
- List of Historic Sites of Japan (Saga)

== Literature ==
- Benesch, Oleg and Ran Zwigenberg (2019). Japan's Castles: Citadels of Modernity in War and Peace. Cambridge: Cambridge University Press. p. 374. ISBN 9781108481946.
- De Lange, William (2021). An Encyclopedia of Japanese Castles. Groningen: Toyo Press. pp. 600 pages. ISBN 978-9492722300.
