= Karatsu Matsuura Tomb Sites =

Karatsu Matsuura Sites
- 唐津松浦墳墓群 (Japanese)
- Karatsu Matsuura Sites Hayamajiri Dolmen Clusteru (Japan)
- Interactive map of Karatsu Matsuura Sites
- 33°24′37.1″N 130°1′17.7″E
- Periods: Yayoi period
- Location: Saga, Saga, Japan
- Region: Kyushu

Site notes
- Public access: Yes (no public facilities)

The Karatsu Matsuura Sites (唐津松浦墳墓群, Karatsu Matsuura funbo-gun) is a group of mostly Yayoi Period archaeological sites, located in the city of Karatsu, Saga Prefecture, Japan. The Hayamajiri Dolmen Cluster was designated a National Historic Site of Japan in 1966, and three more locations were added in 2014.

== Hayamajiri Dolmen Cluster ==
The Hayamajiri Dolmen Cluster (葉山尻支石墓群, Hayamajiri Shisekibo-gun) is a group of dolmen graves in the Handa neighborhood of the city of Karatsu, Saga Prefecture Japan. The cluster is located at the northern end of a hill about 30 meters above sea level that extends north from Mount Iimoriyama. The site is consisted mainly of dolmens and jar burial mounds from the end of the Late Jōmon period to the middle Yayoi period. It was discovered in 1951, and archaeological excavations began the following year, resulting in the confirmation of six dolmens, 26 jar burial mounds, and one kofun burial mound. The dolmens all have granite upper stones supported by six to eight supporting stones, and the interiors consist of pit graves and jar burials. Dolmen No. 1, the northernmost of the cluster, contains six jar burial mounds from the middle Yayoi period, and tubular beads were found as grave goods. This site was the first dolmen to be academically surveyed in Japan, and was designated a National Historic Site in 1966 due to its importance in researching the connection between the Yayoi period burial customs and those of the Korean Peninsula, as the dolmen burial system is thought to have been introduced to the Japanese archipelago from Korea. The site is about a 10-minute drive from Karatsu Station on the JR Kyushu Karatsu Line.

== Ōdomo Site ==
The Ōdomo Site (大友遺跡, Ōdomo iseki) is located on top of sand dunes facing the Genkai Sea in the Ōdomo, Yobuko-cho neighborhood of the city of Karatsu. It is a cemetery dating from the beginning of the Yayoi period to the following Kofun period. It was discovered in 1967 by a junior high school student who was swimming in the sea, and nine excavations have been carried out up until 2004. As a result of the excavations, over 210 tombs, including dolmens, pit tombs, jar tombs, and stone coffin tombs, which were introduced via the Korean Peninsula at the beginning of the Yayoi period, were confirmed. Shell bracelets, which are ornaments made from shells from the Amami Islands or Okinawa, were also found, suggesting that the people buried here had extensive interactions with the Korean Peninsula and the Nansei Islands. It has also been noted that the human bones found in the dolmens were not typical of so-called "immigrant people," but rather had "Jōmon" characteristics, such as low, flat cheekbones and wide noses.

== Morita Dolmen Cluster ==
The Morita Dolmen Cluster (森田支石墓群, Morita Shisekibo-gun) is located in the Uki neighborhood of the city of Karatsu, on the eastern foot of Mount Yuhi, overlooking the Karatsu Plain, on the east side of the Matsuura River. Excavations have been conducted three times, in 1966, 1995, and 2005. The 1966 excavation was conducted jointly by Kyushu University and the École française d'Extrême-Orient. At the time, it was rare for a foreign research institute to participate in a Japanese archaeological excavation. As a result of three excavations, 16 dolmens were identified. Of these, only three dolmens (No. 1, 4, and 8) were excavated, excluding the upper stones and including the lower structure. The rest are preserved on-site, unsurveyed, in order to prioritize the preservation of the remains. During the survey in 1995, a jar coffin thought to have been made in the late Jōmon period was unearthed next to a dolmen.

== Sakura no Baba Site ==
The Sakura no Baba Site (桜馬場遺跡), Sakuranobaba iseki) is located between the Hirano-cho and Yamashita-cho neighborhoods of the city of Karatsu, southwest of the sand dune area north of Karatsu city. The jar coffins at this site date to the late Yayoi period. It was discovered when a jointed earthenware coffin was excavated during construction of an air raid shelter. Excavations were carried outiin 1945–1946, and in 1955. Inside the coffin were two bronze mirrors with square grid patterns, 26 bronze bracelets of two types with hooks, three bronze objects of two types in the shape of a tomoe, a fragment of an iron sword, and a very large number of jade magatama, glass tubular beads, and small glass beads, totaling more than 2,400 items.The circumstances of the excavation are unclear, but a fragment of a wide bronze spearhead and a fragment of a Chogi Shisonai flower pattern mirror have been found nearby. While major archaeological sites from the middle Yayoi period, where Korean-made bronze products were found as grave goods, are mainly found on the east bank of the Matsuura River, this suggests that this area may have been the base of Matsurokoku, a country described in Wajinden, Liangshu and History of the Northern Dynasties, as is the first place where in Wa where emissaries from Wei, landed on the mainland of Japan. In 1955, a stone-lidded earthenware coffin and three types of earthenware were subsequently excavated The artifacts from this site are currently kept at the Saga Prefectural Museum.

== See also ==
- List of Historic Sites of Japan (Saga)
