= Anegawa Castle =

Castle in Kanzaki, Saga, Japan

Coordinates: 33°17′37.3″N 130°20′56.6″E

- 姉川城
- Kanzaki, Saga Japan
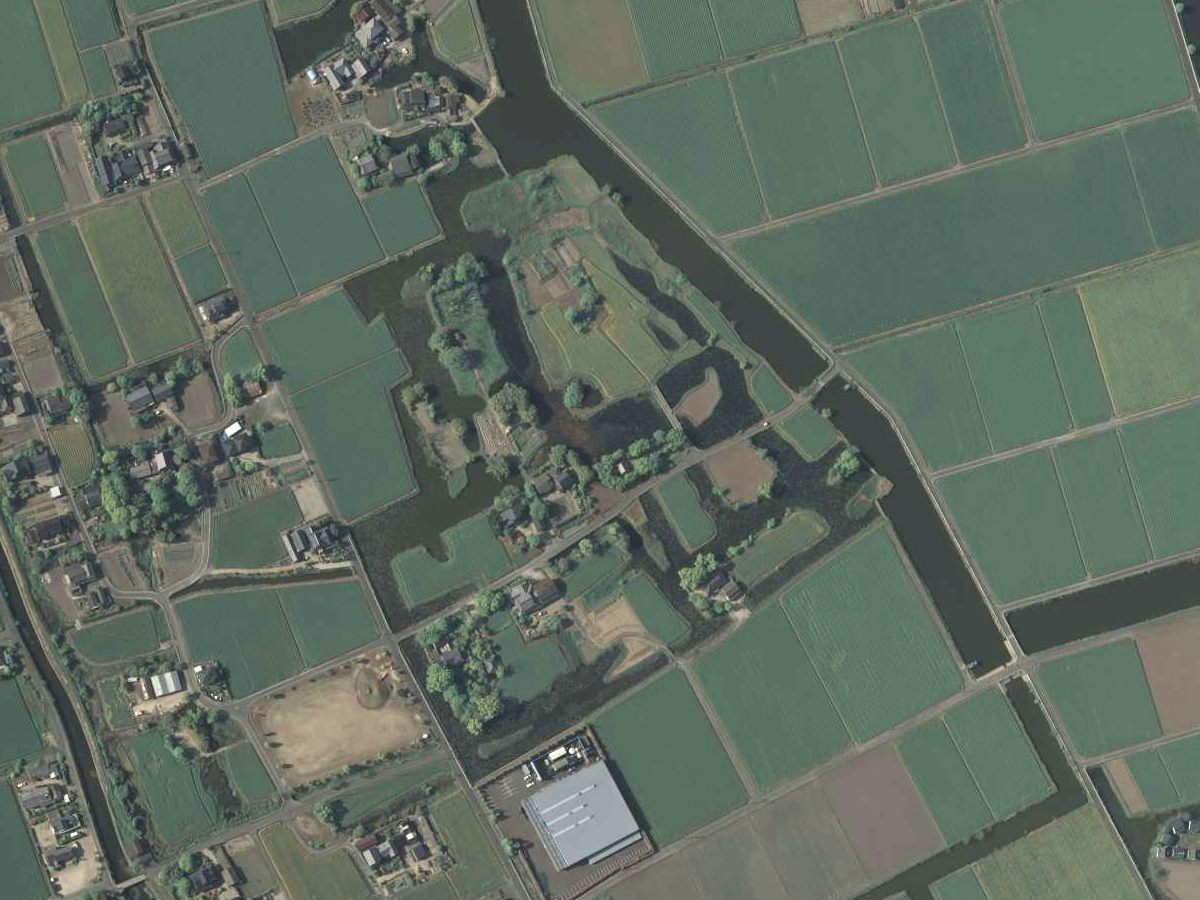
- Anegawa Castle Ruin Aerial Photo 2008

Site information
- Type: hirayama-style Japanese castle
- Open to the public: yes
- Condition: Archaeological and designated national historical site; castle ruins

Location
- Location within Saga Prefecture Location within Japan

Site history
- Built: c.1360
- In use: Sengoku
- National Historic Site of Japan

Anegawa Castle (姉川城, Anegawa-jō) was a hirayama-style Japanese castle located in the city of Kanzaki, Saga Prefecture, on the island of Kyushu, Japan. During the Sengoku period, it was the stronghold of Ryūzōji Takanobu. The castle site has been a National Historic Site since 2010.

== History ==
Anegawa Castle was located on the left bank of the Nakachie River, which flows through the eastern part of the Saga Plain, in an alluvial plain about three meters above sea level, in a rice paddy field area. It is a unique castle with a settlement-like structure, protected primarily by a network of moats. It was built by the Kikuchi clan around 1360, and later became the castle of a cadet branch, the Anegawa clan. During the Sengoku period, it was subordinate to the Ryūzōji clan, and was abandoned after Toyotomi Hideyoshi's conquered Kyushu from 1586 to 1587. The fortifications measure about 800 meters north-to-south and 550 meters east-to-west, and consists of many islands separated by water moats. The extent of the fortifications gradually grew from the 14th century to the latter half of the 16th century. On the island that was the inner bailey, the remains of a boat dock and earthworks can be seen, and excavated remains of post-hole buildings, bridges, wells, and other structures have been unearthed. The castle ruins are about a ten-minute drive from Kanzaki Station on the JR Kyushu Nagasaki Main Line.

Although it is a national historic site, it has not been particularly maintained, and the islands that were once enclosures are now farmland, housing sites, temple grounds, and shrine grounds. However, the remnants of the moats remain extensive.

== Literature ==
- Benesch, Oleg and Ran Zwigenberg (2019). Japan's Castles: Citadels of Modernity in War and Peace. Cambridge: Cambridge University Press. p. 374. ISBN 9781108481946.
- De Lange, William (2021). An Encyclopedia of Japanese Castles. Groningen: Toyo Press. pp. 600 pages. ISBN 978-9492722300.

== See also ==
- List of Historic Sites of Japan (Saga)
