= Higashimyō Site =

Jōmon period archaeological site in Saga, Saga, Japan

Higashimyō ruins
- 東名遺跡 (Japanese)
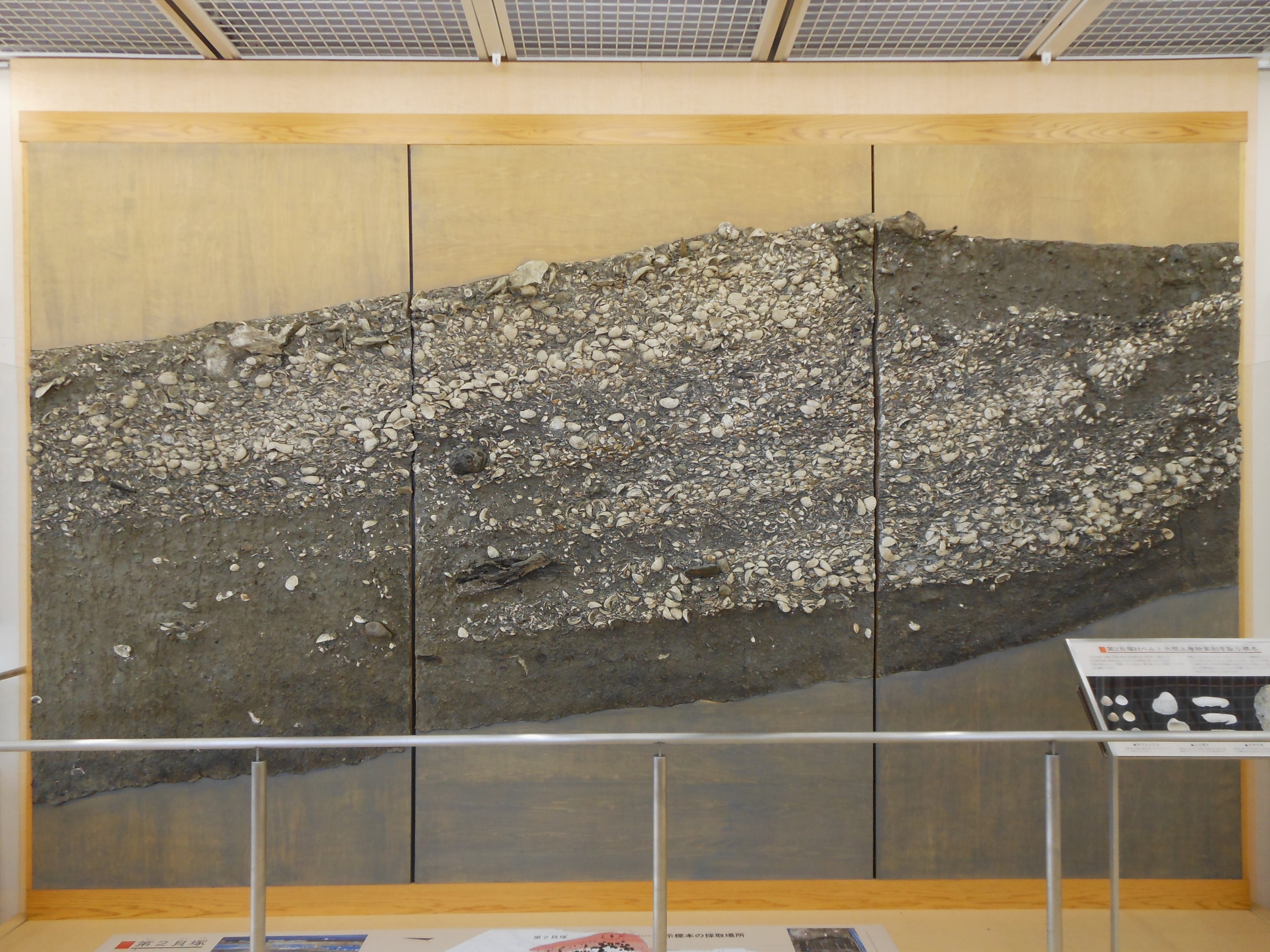
- Cross-section of shell midden from Higashimyō Site

- Higashimyō ruins Higashimyō Site (Japan)
- Interactive map of Higashimyō ruins
- 33°17′39″N 130°18′32″E
- Type: settlement, midden
- Periods: Jōmon period
- Location: Saga, Saga, Japan
- Region: Kyushu

Site notes
- Public access: Yes (museum)

The Higashimyō ruins (東名遺跡, Higashimyō iseki) is an archaeological site containing the ruins of a late early Jōmon period settlement and shell mound located in what is now the Chifu, Kinryū neighborhood of the city of Saga, Saga Prefecture, Japan. The site was designated a National Historic Site of Japan in 2016 and is where the oldest woven baskets, combs, wooden plates, and organic remains yet discovered in Japan have been found.

== Overview ==
The Higashimyō site is located on a low-lying marshland in the central Saga Plain, north of the modern Saga city. It is about 12 kilometers inland from the current coastline, but the coastline at the time of the Jōmon Maximum Transgression, about 7,000 years ago was near the site, and there is a large river nearby, and the site is estimated to be on the left bank of that river. The surrounding area of the site is tidal flats and reed fields, and it is thought that the environment was similar to the current Ariake Sea coast. The Hisadomi Nihonsugi Site (久富二本杉遺跡), which is associated with a shell mound from the same period, is located 300 meters northwest of this site.

The Jōmon transgression lasted from 16,000 to 7,000 years ago, and the coastline continued to move during this period. It is believed that the area around this site became a coastline about 8,000 years ago, and the Jōmon people who sought seafood established a settlement here. The age of the excavated remains is limited to about a 500 to 600-year period. Since a thick clay layer of over five meters, which was created by the accumulation of floating mud (clay) carried by the flood tide in addition to the sediment carried by the river (just like the current coast of the Ariake Sea) has been deposited on top, it is believed that the area sank below sea level and became uninhabitable. After that, the sea gradually receded and the area became land again, but the groundwater level remained high. The remains were first discovered in 1990 as part of construction work on a flood control project. Archaeological excavations were conducted from 1990 to 1996, during which time the remains of numerous hearths, Jōmon pottery, stone tools (arrowheads, harpoons, awls, scrapers, grinding stones), animal bones, and a concentration of human bones that appears to be a cemetery were discovered. Eight bodies were excavated in what is thought to be the cemetery. All were buried in a flexed position. Isotopic analysis of the remains suggests that the diet consisted mainly of terrestrial plants, with seafood as a secondary protein source.

In 2003, a shell mound was discovered and subsequent investigations revealed six shell mounds at levels of two meters below sea level. The second phase of excavations from 2004 to 2007 focused on the No.1 and No. 2 shell middens, which are geographically in the middle of the six mounds. Numerous mammal and fish bones, as well as bone and horn tools, were excavated. Numerous prehistoric storage pits were also discovered, mainly around the second shell mound, from which acorns that were not very decomposed and many woven baskets were excavated, and various wooden products such as plates, bowls, paddles, and combs were found in good condition from the clay layer that was a wetland at the time. These included some of the oldest in Japan, and the woven baskets with various weaving patterns and antler accessories at different stages of production, which gave a rare glimpse into the pattern culture of the time, as most prehistoric sites in Japan are prone to deterioration due to acidic soil, and there are few sites where the artifacts are well preserved. The remaining four shell middens, the third to sixth, were preserved by filling without being excavated.

The main excavated artifacts are on display at the Higashimyō Jōmon Museum, located in the Kosegawa Reservoir Management Building. Plans exist to open the site to the public by 2027. The site is approximately 15 minutes by car form JR Kyushu Saga Station.

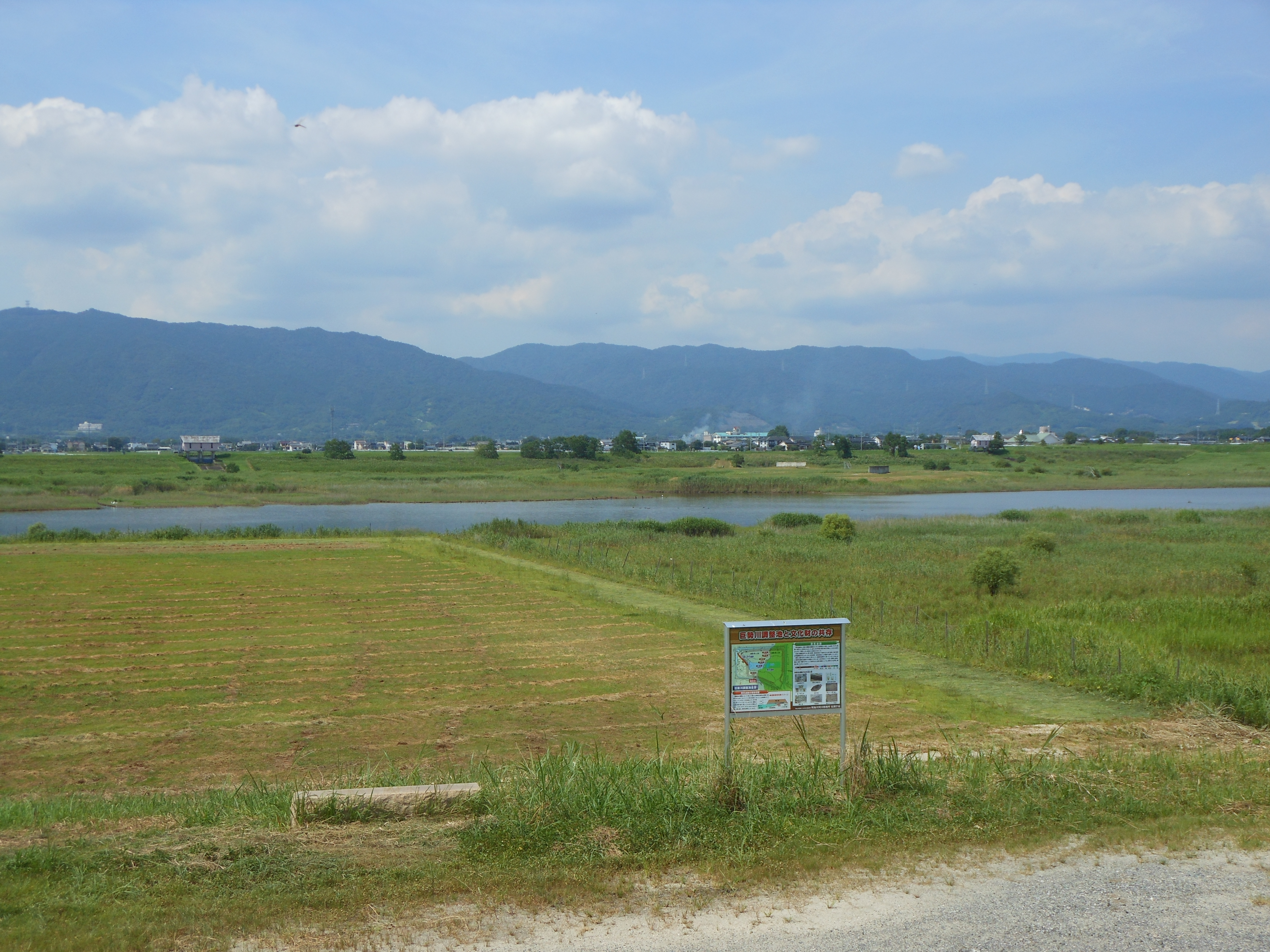
View of the Higashimyō Site

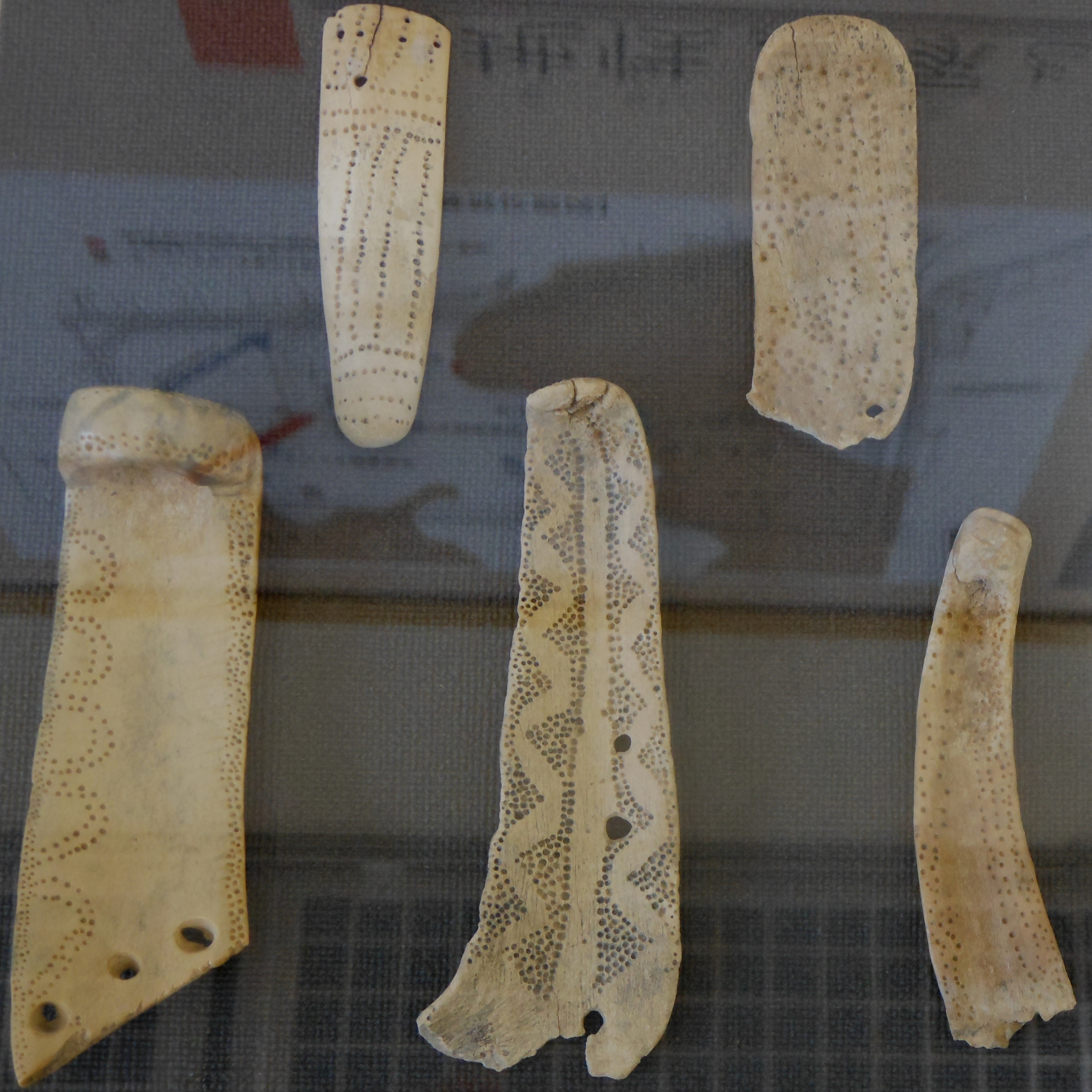
Deer horn accessories from the Higashimyō Site

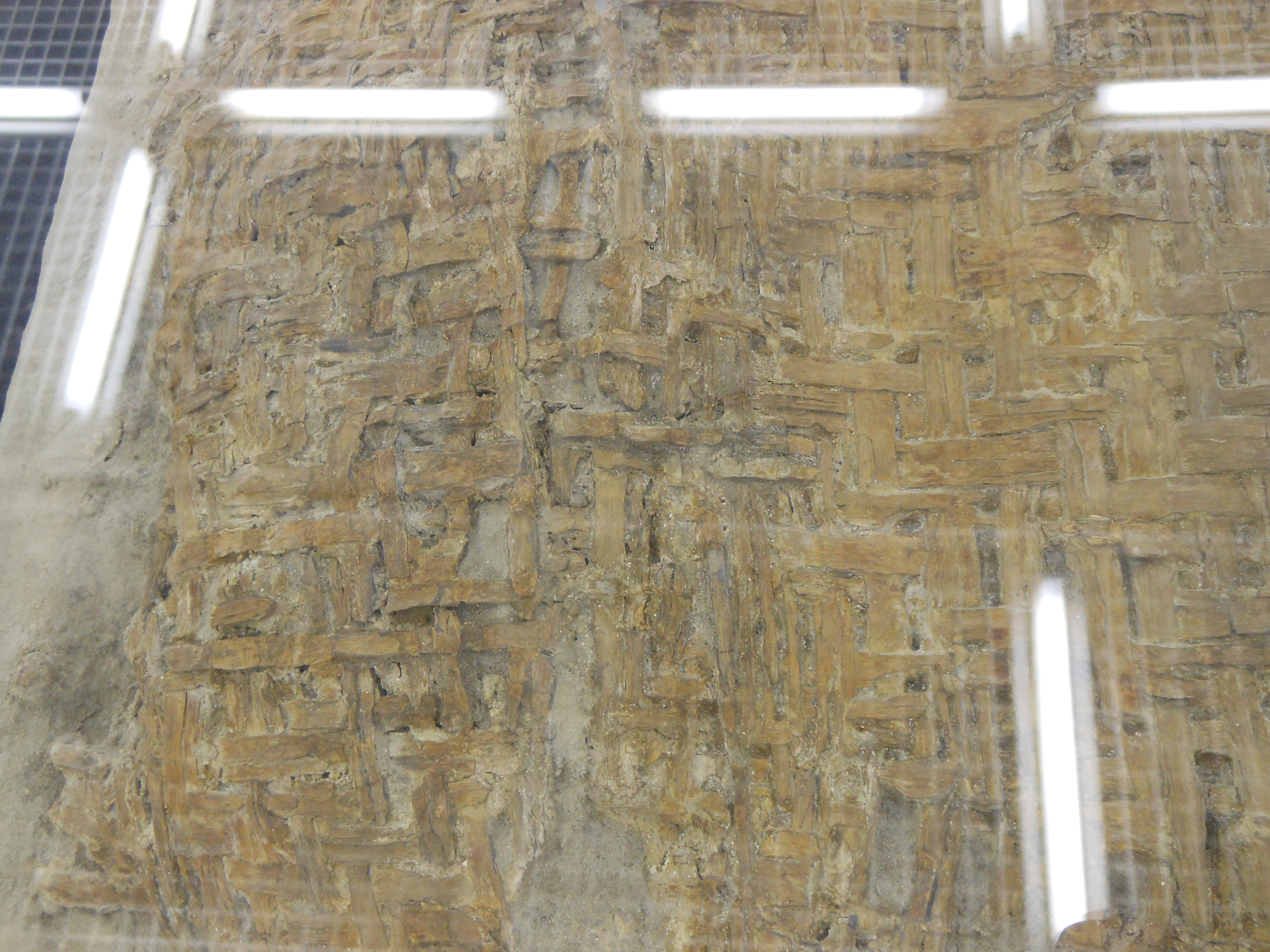
Jomon period basket from Higashimyō Site

== See also ==
- List of Historic Sites of Japan (Saga)
