= Hizen Pottery Kiln Sites =

- 肥前陶器窯跡 (Japanese)
- Hizen Pottery Kiln Sites Hizen Pottery Kiln Sites (Japan)
- Interactive map of Hizen Pottery Kiln Sites
- 33°14′08″N 129°59′07″E
- Type: Kiln ruins
- Periods: Edo period
- Location: Karatsu, Takeo, Taku, Saga, Japan
- Region: Kyushu

History
- Built: 16th-19th century

Site notes
- Public access: Yes

The Hizen Pottery Kiln Sites (肥前陶器窯跡) refers to Edo Period kilns located in the cities of Takeo, Taku and Karatsu, Saga Prefecture, Japan. Four of these sites were collectively designated a National Historic Sites in 1940, and an additional six sites were added in 2005.

== Overview ==
Hizen Province was a prominent pottery manufacturing location from the late 16th century.The history of Hizen's pottery industry began in the 1580s, when kilns for producing pottery (Karatsu ware), using techniques imported from the Korean Peninsula, were established around Kishitake Castle (Kitahata, Karatsu).

Various feudal lords, most notably Gotō Ienobu, lord of Takeo, brought potters back from the Korean Peninsula during the Japanese invasion of Korea from 1592-1598, leading to production areas expanding throughout Hizen. The base of Mount Takekoba, in what is now the city of Takeo, became the main center of production, with about 90 kilns remaining to this day.

=== Originally designated sites ===
Four kilns were designated a National Historic Site in 1940. All are split-bamboo or multi-chambered climbing kilns that originated from techniques imported from the Korean Peninsula.

- Sabiya Kiln Site (錆谷窯跡) - Products at this location were mainly bowls and small plates. There are few products with ironwork decorations, but whale skin pattern products were also relatively common. Operation began around the early 17th century.
- Kotoge Kiln Site (小峠窯跡) - Products at this site featured ironwork decorations, brushstrokes, inlays, and stencil printing, and attempts were made to produce celadon and blue-and-white porcelain. The site was in operation from the early 17th century to the first half of the 18th century.
- Otani Kiln Site (大谷窯跡) - Production at this site mainly consisted of large plates and bowls, with brushed and two-color decorations. Other products included porcelain and Kyoto-style pottery. The end of operation was in the late 17th century.
- Hashiba Monoharayama Site (土師場物原山) - This is where defective products fired in various kilns were dumped, and they have piled up in a small mound about 110 meters deep. Products include black-glazed and blue-glazed teapots. Most appear to date to the mid- to late Edo period. It is an important archaeological site for learning about early Karatsu ware.

=== Later designated sites ===
In 2005, five more sites were added: all located at the foot of Mount Kishi in Kitahata in Karatsu City. Based on the characteristics of their products and kiln structure, such as the glazes, molding techniques, and kiln loading methods, these kiln sites are thought to date back to the late 16th century, making them some of the earliest kiln sites. In addition, the Ochakama Kiln Site in Machida, also within Kusatsu City, and the Tojinkoba Kiln Site in Taku City, were also added to the list.

- Sarayakami Kiln Site (皿屋上窯跡)
- Saraya Kiln Site (皿屋窯跡)
- Hobashira Kiln Site (帆柱窯跡)
- Handogamegami Kiln Site (飯洞甕上窯跡)
- Hando Mikashita Kiln Site (飯洞甕下窯跡)
- Tojinkoba Kiln Site (唐人古場窯跡) - This site is located to the west of the Taku Basin, upstream the Ushizu River, is the which, according to Taku family documents, was first built by Yi Sam-pyeong, who was brought to Japan during Hideyoshi's invasion of Korea. It is believed to have been in operation between the 16th and early 17th centuries. The kiln structure with no steps between firing chambers and the product features reminiscent of porcelain production techniques are similar to those of the Korean Peninsula.
- Ochawan Kiln Site (御茶窯跡) - Located in the Machida neighborhood of Karatsu, was an official kiln that was in continuous use from the Edo period until the Meiji restoration and continued into the Taisho era. This was a multi-chambered climbing kiln with at least seven firing chambers. It was used as an official kiln for Karatsu Domain from the mid- to late Edo period, and was subsequently used by the Nakazato family until the Taisho era. Products from this official kiln are known as "presented Karatsu" and include a variety of tableware in addition to tea ware.

== Access ==
The Kotoge Kiln Site is about a 30-minute drive from Takeo-Onsen Station on the JR Kyushu Sasebo Line.

== See also ==
- List of Historic Sites of Japan (Saga)
