= Taniguchi Kofun =

Kofun period burial mound in Karatsu, Saga, Japan

- 谷口古墳 (Japanese)
- Taniguchi Kofun Taniguchi Kofun (Japan)
- Interactive map of Taniguchi Kofun
- 33°27′10″N 130°03′16″E
- Type: Kofun
- Periods: Kofun period
- Location: Karatsu, Saga, Japan
- Region: Kyushu

History
- Built: c.4th century

Site notes
- Public access: Yes

The Taniguchi Kofun (谷口古墳) is a Kofun period burial mound, located in the Hamatama neighborhood of the city of Karatsu, Saga Prefecture Japan. The tumulus was designated a National Historic Site of Japan in 1941.

== Overview ==
The Taniguchi Kofun is a zenpō-kōen-fun (前方後円墳), which is shaped like a keyhole, having one square end and one circular end, when viewed from above. It is located on a hill 20–40 meters above sea level, which branches off from the 535-meter Mount Tonbo at the eastern end of the Karatsu Plain, at the southeastern edge of Matsuura Bay. The tumulus has an overall length of 77 meters and is orientated to the southwest. The posterior circular portion is 30-meters in diameter, and the width of the anterior rectangular portion is 24 meters. Fukiishi and fragments of haniwa have been found. In an archaeological excavation in 1908, the rear mound was excavated and two stone side-entry pit-style burial chambers with chest-shaped stone sarcophagi were discovered. The western stone chamber was badly damaged and was backfilled after the sarcophagus was removed, so the details are unknown, but the eastern stone chamber, which remains intact, measures 2.9 x 1.6 meters and has a unique structure with four corbel walls and no ceiling stone frame. The chest-shaped stone sarcophagus, which was dug into the floor, has rope-hanging protrusions on the short sides and a stone pillow carved into the top of the bottom stone. Grave goods include seven bronze mirrors, eleven stone bracelets, ironware, and jewels, which indicate a strong influence from the Kinai region of Japan. A separate burial with a boat-shaped stone sarcophagus in the anterior rectangular portion. A fragment of a cylindrical haniwa found during a 1989 excavation indicates that the tumulus was built around the end of the 4th century.

The tumulus is about a 20-minute walk from Hamasaki Station on the JR Kyushu Chikuhi Line.

== See also ==
- List of Historic Sites of Japan (Saga)
