= Kyushu Ryukoku Junior College =

Private junior college in Saga, Japan

Coordinates: 33°21′42″N 130°28′38″E

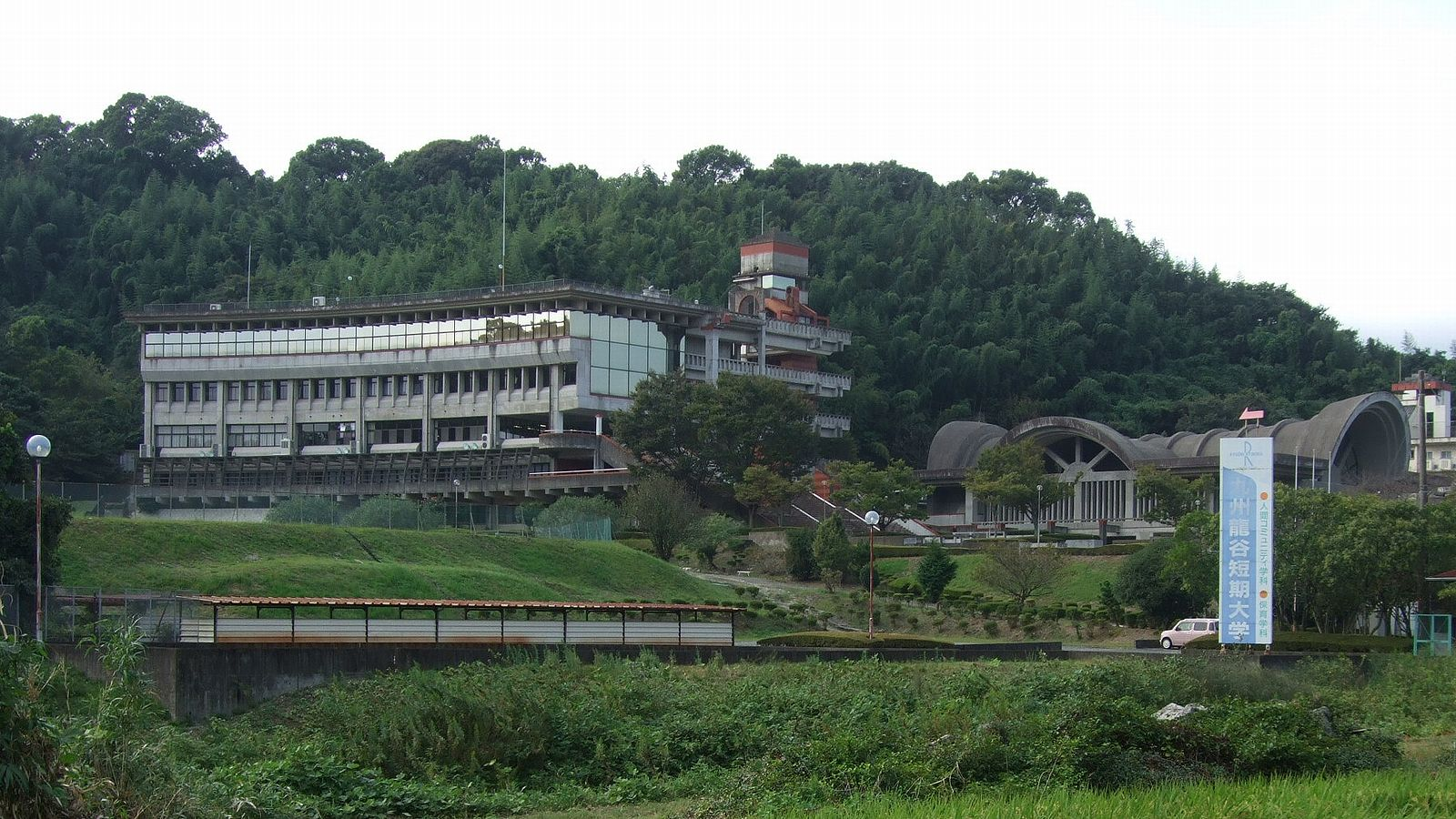
Kyushu Ryukoku Junior College

Kyushu Ryukoku Junior College (九州龍谷短期大学, Kyūshū ryūkoku tanki daigaku) is a private junior college in Tosu, Japan, established in 1952. The college moved to its present site in 1985. The predecessor of the school was founded in 1878.

On 29 January 2024, a board of directors meeting decided that the school would suspend new admissions from 2025.
