= Hizen Porcelain Kiln Sites =

- 肥前磁器窯跡 (Japanese)
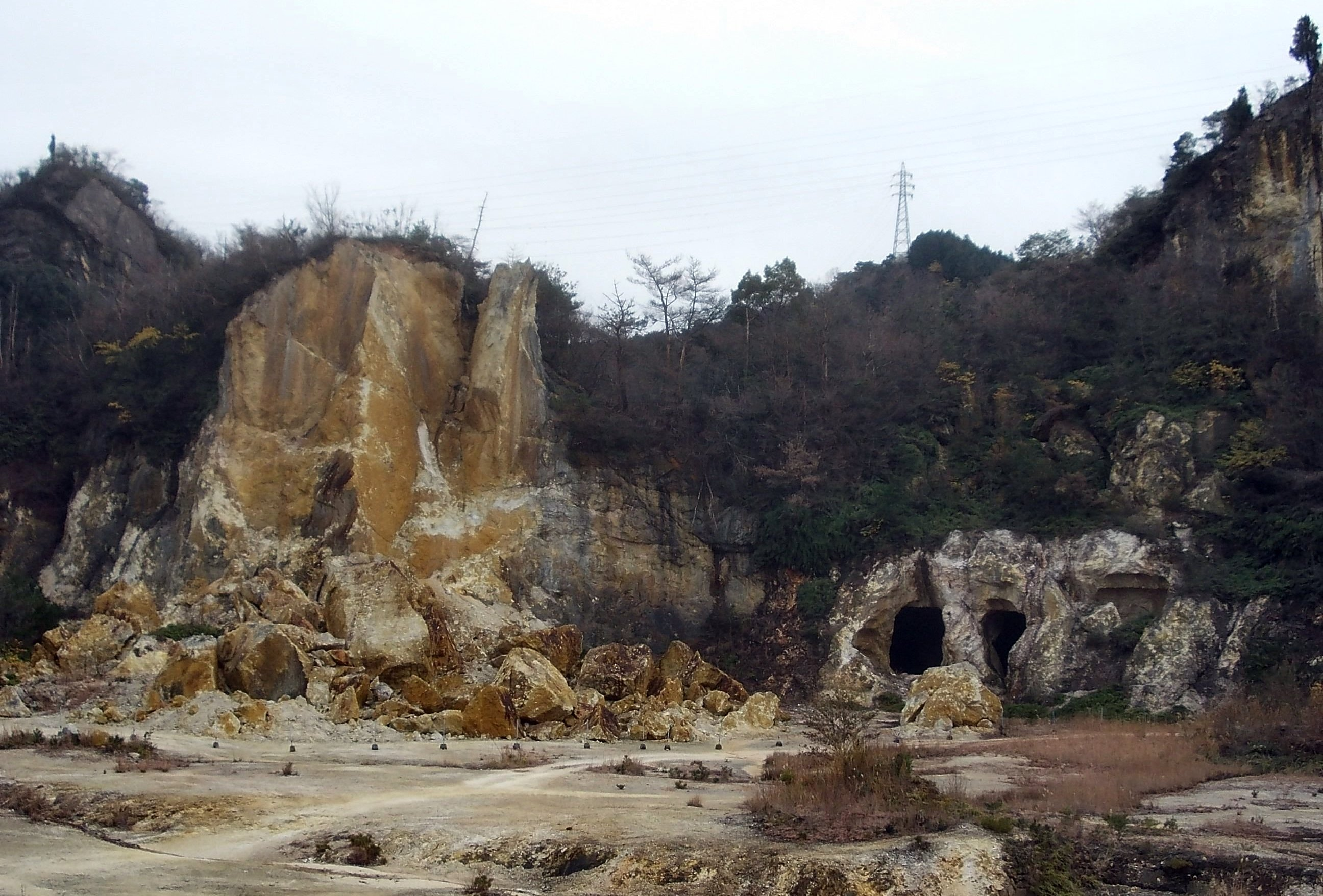
- Izumiyama clay mine

- Hizen Porcelain Kiln Sites Hizen Porcelain Kiln Sites (Japan)
- Interactive map of Hizen Porcelain Kiln Sites
- 33°11′39″N 129°54′36″E
- Type: Kiln ruins
- Periods: Edo period
- Location: Arita, Takeo, Ureshino, Saga, Japan
- Region: Kyushu

History
- Built: 17th century

Site notes
- Public access: Yes

The Hizen Porcelain Kiln Sites (肥前磁器窯跡) refers to Edo Period kilns located in the town of Arita and cities of Takeo and Ureshino, Saga Prefecture, Japan which were designated National Historic Sites in 1980, and were re-designated as a single collective National Historic Site in 1981.

== Overview ==
The Hizen Porcelain Kiln Sites are located in former Hizen Province and are important kiln sites for understanding the transition of porcelain production in the development of early Arita ware and Imari ware. At the end of the Edo period, there were more than 100 climbing kilns of various sizes, but most of them have been lost today, and only about 66 kiln sites have been confirmed. The National Historic Site designation covers:

=== Izumiyama Jiseki Baato (泉山磁石場跡) ===
According to tradition, the Korean potter Yi Sam-pyeong (d. 1655), or Kanagae Sanbee (金ヶ江三兵衛), often considered the father of Arita ware porcelain, first discovered porcelain clay at this location in what is now part of the town of Arita.

=== Tengudani Kiln Ruins (天狗谷窯跡) ===
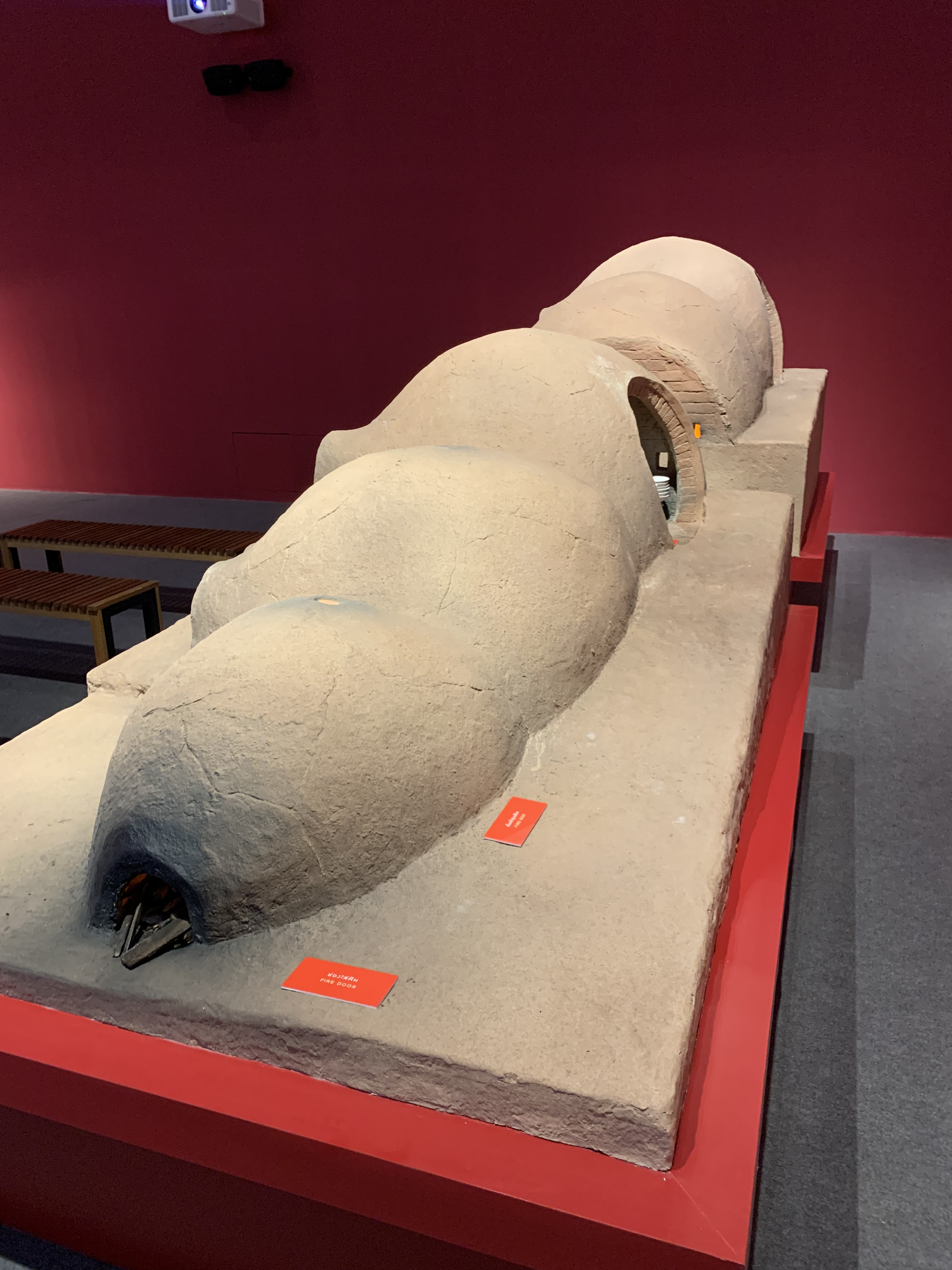
A scaled replica of Japanese climbing kiln from Tengudani Kiln Ruins, display at a temporary exhibition in Bangkok National Museum

The first Arita ware kilns were built at Tengudani in what is now the Shirakawadani neighborhood of the town of Arita by Yi Sam-pyeong due to its proximity to the Izumiyama quarry and the availability of water and firewood for fuel. The site was in use from about 1630 to the 1660s When the kiln was first built, porcelain and earthenware were made together here, but later only porcelain was produced, and it is now Arita's oldest dedicated porcelain kiln. Tengudani was the first of 66 kiln sites to be investigated by 20th century archaeologists in Arita, and was excavated in 1965-1970 and again in 1999–2001. The first was the first early modern ceramic kiln site to be excavated in Arita, and was a landmark for art history and geology. These excavations uncovered the remains of at least four climbing kilns. The heat of firing caused the chambers inside the kilns to gradually collapse, and replacement kilns were built in succession. The kiln that remains at this site is the best-preserved of the four, and was therefore chosen for preservation and public display. Known as "B" kiln because it was the second to be discovered, it is believed to have been in use between the 1640s and 1650s. At around 70 metres long and with 21 chambers, it was very large for its time. Managed by Saga Domain, the kiln used a lottery system to determine which chamber in the kiln each porcelain producer would use. Because the fire was fired from the bottom of the slope, the lower rooms were at risk of becoming too hot, while the higher rooms were often too cold and did not fire properly. Many shards of broken and discarded porcelain pieces have been found around the kiln ruins. A model based on the Tengudani Kiln's climbing kiln is on display at the Arita Town History and Folklore Museum.The Tengudani Kiln Site is about a 20-minute drive from Arita Station on the JR Kyushu Sasebo Line.

=== Yamabeta Kiln Ruins (山辺田窯跡) ===
The Yamabeda Kiln Site was located in the Kuromuta neighborhood, northwest of Arita. It was in operation from the 1590s to the 1660s and at its height had up to 30 workshops with a round 300 craftsmen. Excavations conducted in 1972-1975 uncovered the remains of nine kilns on the hills next to the rice paddies, and porcelain shards trace the transition of porcelain from Imari to the Kokutani styles. The oldest kiln, No. 4, mainly produced ceramic bowls and large plates, with iron painting. The kiln had been in operation before porcelain production began. Kiln No.7 likewise produced both pottery and porcelain, mostly large blue-and-white plates. Around this time, Arita saw a major turning point in the ceramic industry, with a policy to consolidate kilns being implemented by Saga Domain from 1637 as the number of kilns and potters in Arita had increased, raising concerned about the indiscriminate felling of trees for firing the kilns. While many of the kilns in western Arita that fired ceramics were forced to close, Yamabeda Kiln is a rare example of a kiln that avoided closure and continued to operate. One of the reasons for this is its specialization in the production of large plates. From kilns No. 3, 6, and 9, blue and white porcelain products as well as colored enamel bases were excavated. Large plates were also found, indicating that from the 1640s onwards, large colored enamel plates were being produced in addition to blue and white porcelain. The later No. 1 and No. 2 kilns are thought to have produced items for overseas export. The Yamabeda Kiln closed around the same time, in the late 1650s to 1660s, and it is believed that this was due to the shift in the Imari ware production system and the change in the style required.

=== Haraake Kiln Ruins (原明窯跡) ===
The Haraake site consists of four kilns and a waste dump located in western Arita. It was excavated in 1974-1975 and 1993. Only pottery was found in the lowest layers whereas a mixture of pottery and porcelain was found in the upper layers. The kiln was founded in the 1600s to 1630s, and is thought to be one of the earliest kilns in Arita to produce porcelain.

=== Hyakken Kiln Ruins (百間窯跡) ===
The Hyakken Kiln was located in former Yamauchi town, now part of the city of Takeo. It was a stepped, multi-chambered climbing kiln that climbs from east to west up the western slope of the Itanokawauchi ridge, and the size of the firing chamber confirmed by excavation surveys was 3.6 meters wide and 1.6 meters deep. The fired products include porcelain such as white porcelain and celadon, mainly with blue-and-white porcelain, as well as inlaid and two-colored pottery. The kiln is known for its wide variety of products, including bowls, plates, bowls, jars, and water jars, and is thought to have been in operation in the first half of the 17th century.

=== Fudoyama Kiln Ruins (不動山窯跡) ===
The Fudoyama Kiln was located in the Sarayadani neighborhood of the city of Ureshino. Died hand plates and celadon and white porcelain shards have been excavated.

== See also ==
- List of Historic Sites of Japan (Saga)
