= Habu Site =

Archaeological site in Japan

- 土生遺跡 (Japanese)
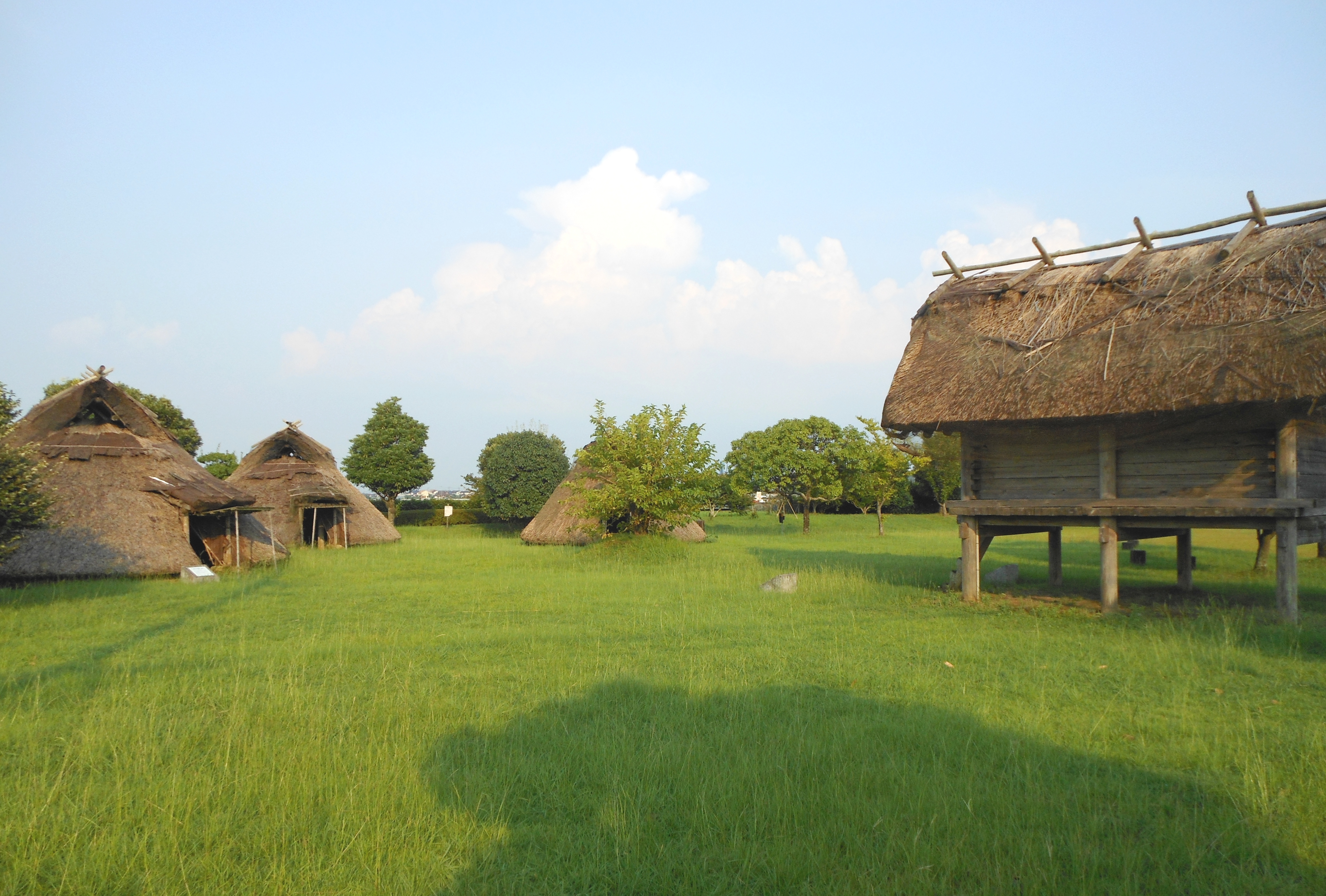
- Habu Site

- Habu Site Site Habu Site (Japan)
- 33°16′33″N 130°12′03″E
- Type: settlement
- Periods: Yayoi period
- Location: Ogi, Saga, Japan
- Region: Kyushu

Site notes
- Public access: Yes (no facilities)
- National Historic Site of Japan

Habu Site (土生遺跡, Habu iseki) is an archaeological site with a Yayoi period settlement trace located in the Mikazuki neighborhood of the city of Ogi, Saga Prefecture Japan. It was designated as a National Historic Site in 1973.

== Overview ==
The Habu site is located on the edge of the alluvial fan formed by the Gion River and the Hareki River, which run south through the northwestern part of the Saga Plain and flow into the Ariake Sea. This area is dotted with remains of settlements and tombs from the Yayoi to Kofun periods. The site was discovered in 1971 during ecological restoration work on paddy fields that had been damaged by coal mining runoff, and was excavated in 1972. At the Habu site, numerous wooden farming tools, stone tools, and Yayoi pottery have been excavated around the traces of five structures, and are considered important in elucidating Yayoi Period agricultural societies and exchanges with the Korean Peninsula. Because this site is located at a high groundwater level, an abundance of organic matter such as wood products and plant seeds has been excavated. Wooden products include farm tools such as hoes (two two-pronged and one three-pronged), four hollowed-out containers, and one black lacquered bowl. Plant-based remains include carbonized rice, and plum, peach, and gourd seeds. Based on the style of pottery excavated, it is believed to be the remains date from the early to middle of the Yayoi period. The site measures approximately 150 meters from north-to-south and 250 meters from east-to-west.

The 15 wooden pillar foundations associated with the remains of the dwellings are around 30-centimetersi n diameter, and have holes at the bottom which would have allowed them to be joined into a raft for river transportation.

Currently, three pit dwellings and one raised-floor storehouse have been restored as an archaeological park. The site is about a 15-minute walk from Ogi Station on the JR Kyushu Karatsu Line.

== See also ==
- List of Historic Sites of Japan (Saga)
