= Yasunagata Site =

Yayoi period archaeological site in Japan

- 安永田遺跡 (Japanese)
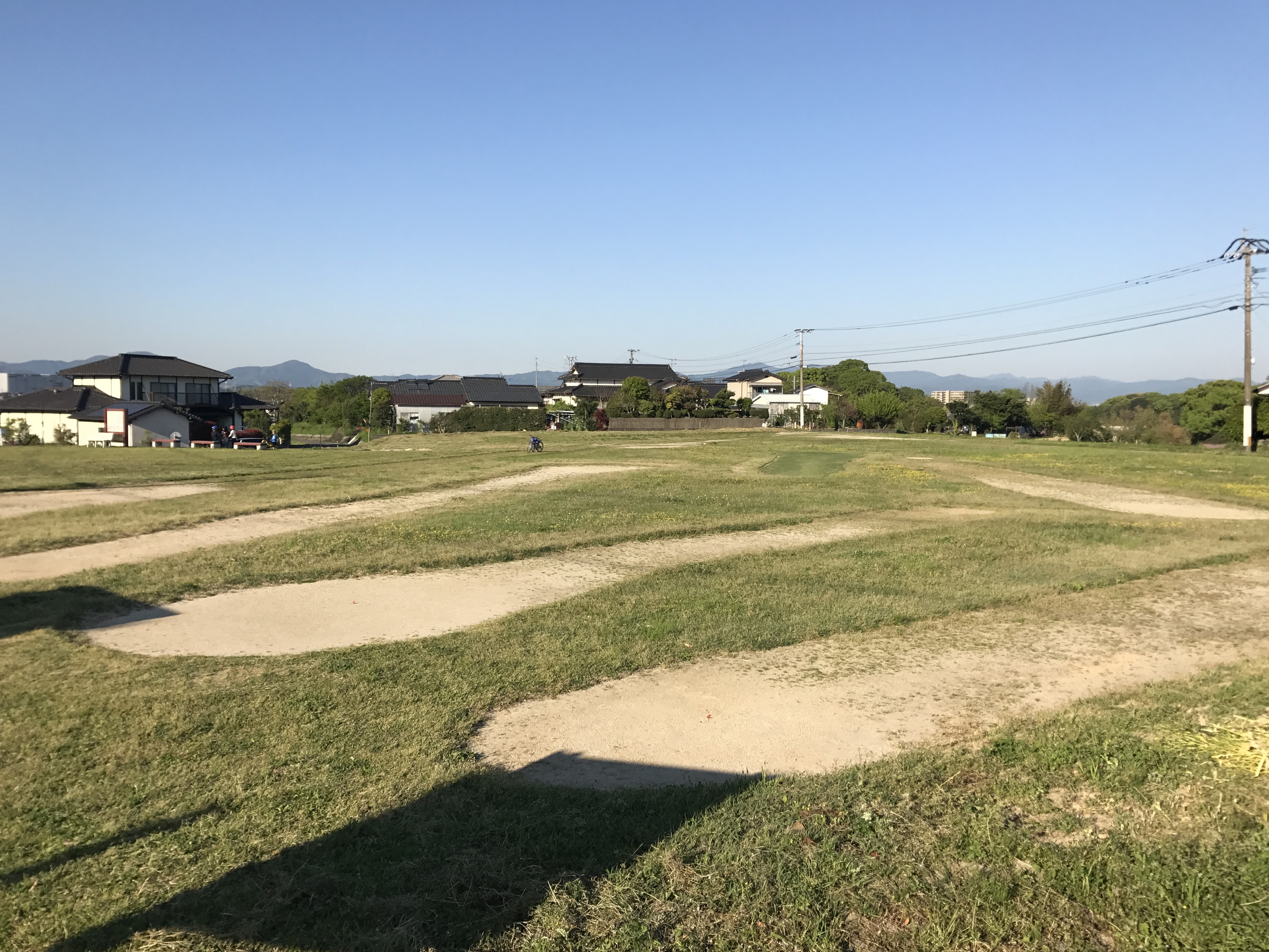
- Yasunagata Site Park

- Yasunagata Site Yasunagata Site (Japan)
- Interactive map of Yasunagata Site
- 33°23′55″N 130°30′52″E
- Type: Settlement
- Periods: Yayoi period
- Location: Tosu, Saga, Japan
- Region: Kyushu

History
- Built: c.2nd century

Site notes
- Public access: Yes (no facilities)

The Yasunagata Site (安永田遺跡) is an archaeological site with the traces of a Yayoi period settlement and bronze casting center, located in the Yubi neighborhood of the city of Tosu, Saga Prefecture, Japan. The site was designated a National Historic Site of Japan in 1982.

== Overview ==
The Yasunagata site is located within the Yubi ruins, which are situated on a fluvial terrace in the northeastern part of the city. The ruins are spread across an area of approximately 6,000 hectares and include approximately 30 separate ruins from the Yayoi period and later. A survey to confirm the area in 1979 unearthed fragments of a bronze dōtaku mold, attracting attention, and archaeological excavations conducted the following year uncovered remains and artifacts related to bronze casting from the middle to late Yayoi period. Dōtaku are bell-shaped objects cast from relatively thin sheets of bronze, whose exact purpose is unknown, bu which appear to have been used for ceremonial or religious purposes. First discovered in Shiga Prefecture, they have been found mainly in western Honshu, the Tōkai region, Shikoku, and the Kansai region. The discovery of the dōtaku mold fragments at this location overturned the conventional view that the bronze spear and sword cultural area was centered in northern Kyushu, whereas the dōtaku cultural area centered in the Kinki region. The five dōtaku molds and five bronze spear molds excavated at the Yasunagata site were subsequently designated National Important Cultural Properties.

At the Yasunaga Site, traces of 49 pit dwellings and 37 jar burial tombs, as well as artifacts such as bronze bells, bellows nozzles, whetstones, and stone knives have been excavated in addition to a large amount of Yayoi pottery. The site has been backfilled and is now a park. It is about a ten-minute drive from Tosu Station on the JR Kyushu Kagoshima Main Line.

== See also ==
- List of Historic Sites of Japan (Saga)
