= Tosu, Saga =

Tosu 鳥栖市
- City
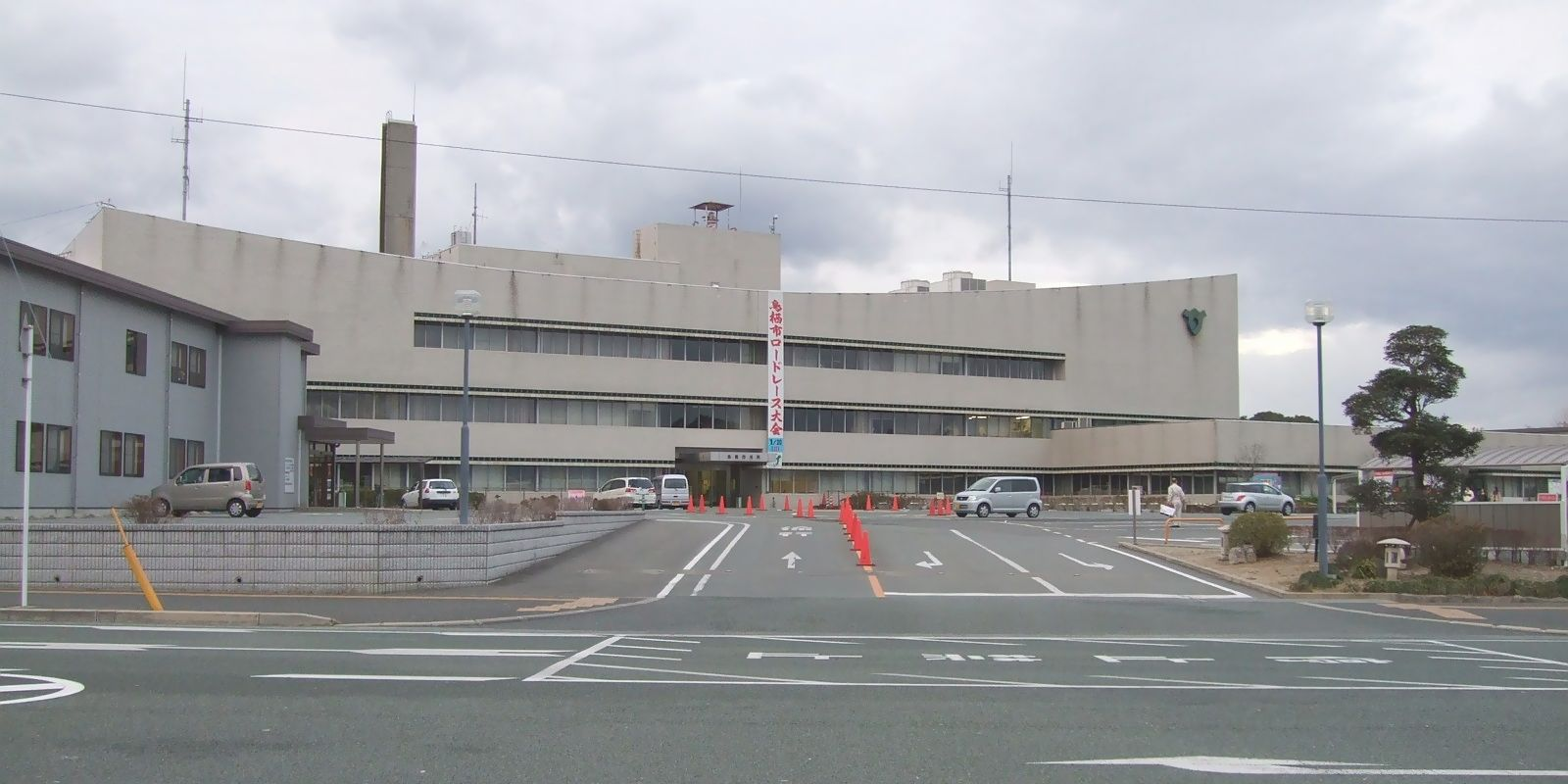
- Tosu City Hall

- Flag Seal
- Location of Tosu in Saga Prefecture

- Location in Japan
- Coordinates: 33°23′N 130°30′E
- Country: Japan
- Region: Kyushu
- Prefecture: Saga

Government
  - Mayor: Yasushi Hashimoto (since March 2007)

Area
  - Total: 71.72 km^{2} (27.69 sq mi)

Population (April 30, 2024)
  - Total: 74,334
  - Density: 1,036/km^{2} (2,684/sq mi)
- Time zone: UTC+09:00 (JST)
- City hall address: 1118 Shukumachi, Tosu-shi, Saga-ken 841-8511
- Website: Official website
- Symbols
- Bird: Japanese white-eye
- Flower: Japanese iris
- Tree: Round leaf holly

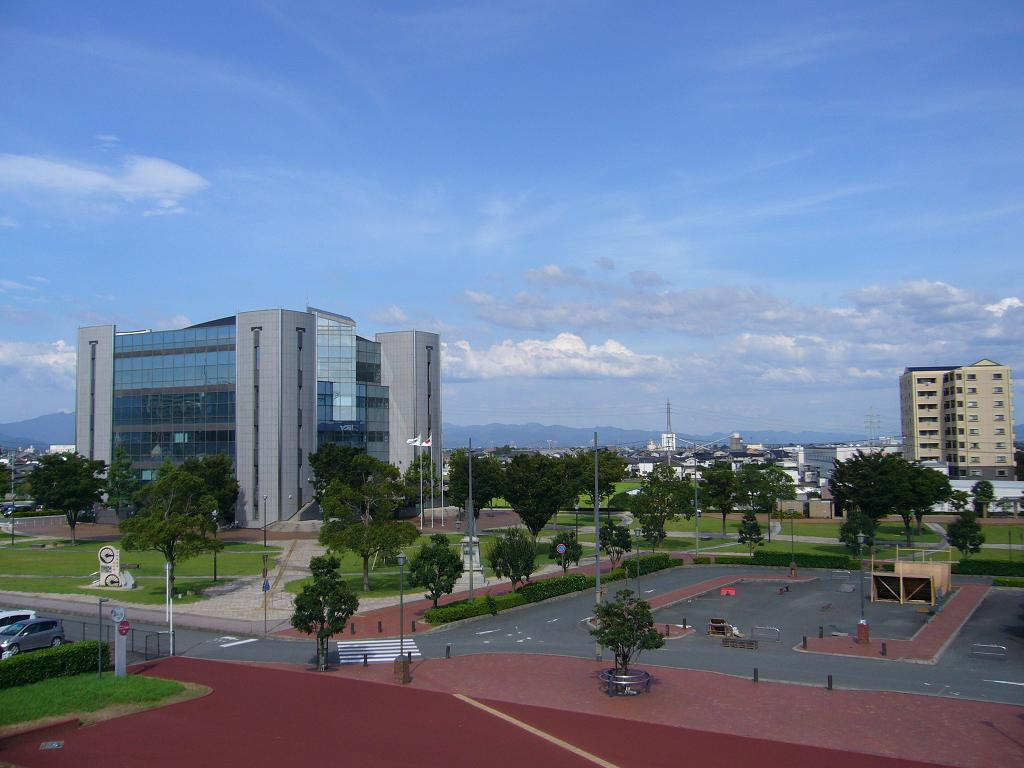
Sun Messe Tosu

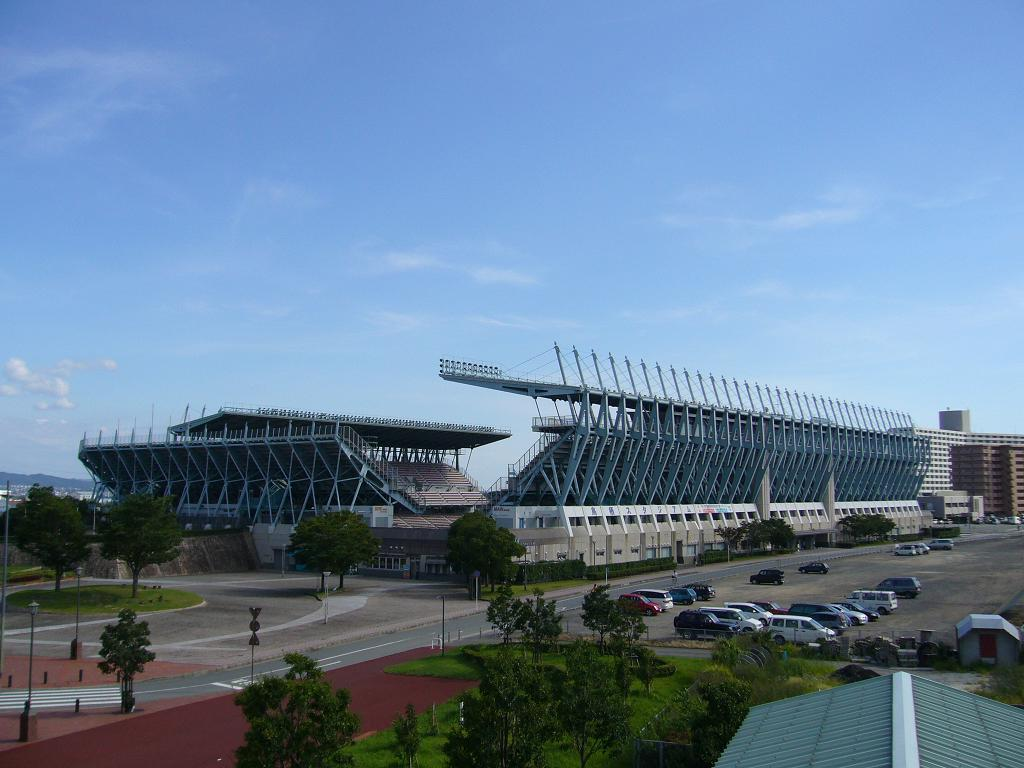
Tosu stadium

Tosu (鳥栖市, Tosu-shi) is a city located in the eastern part of Saga Prefecture on the island of Kyushu, Japan. As of 30 April 2024, the city had an estimated population of 74,334 in 33597 households, and a population density of 1000 persons per km^{2}. The total area of the city is 71.72 km^{2} (27.69 sq mi).

== Geography ==
Located in the Saga Plains, the Chikushi River runs along the southern border of Tosu. The lowlands are used for paddy fields and is where the urban center is located. The northwestern part of the city is in the eastern part of the Sefuri Mountaians.

=== Mountains ===
- Mount Ishidani (754 m)
- Mount Kusenbu (848 m)
- Shiroyama (501 m)

=== Rivers ===
- Akimitsu River
- Ara River
- Chikugo River
- Daigi River
- Hōman River
- Yamashita River

=== Dams ===
- Kawachi Dam

=== Adjoining municipalities ===
Fukuoka Prefecture

- Chikushino
- Kurume
- Nakagawa
- Ogōri

Saga Prefecture

- Kiyama
- Miyaki

=== Climate ===
Tosu has a humid subtropical climate (Köppen Cfa) characterized by warm summers and cool winters with light to no snowfall. The average annual temperature in Tosu is 15.1 °C. The average annual rainfall is 1766 mm with September as the wettest month. The temperatures are highest on average in August, at around 26.2 °C, and lowest in January, at around 4.3 °C.

=== Demographics ===
Per Japanese census data, the population of Tosu is as shown below.

Historical population
Year	Pop.	±%
1940	31,401	—
1950	39,781	+26.7%
1960	41,870	+5.3%
1970	47,369	+13.1%
1980	54,254	+14.5%
1990	55,877	+3.0%
2000	60,726	+8.7%
2010	69,074	+13.7%
2020	74,196	+7.4%

== History ==
The area of Tosu was part of ancient Hizen Province, and during the Edo period was an exclave of Tsushima-Fuchū Domain under the Tokugawa shogunate. Tashiro-juku was home to the taxation rice storehouse and magistrate's office of the domain. It was also a stopping place for Joseon missions to Japan. The Sō clan prospered from its knowledge of Chinese traditional medicine and access to supplies imported from Korea, and the region was considered one of the four major pharmaceutical centers in pre-modern Japan. Following the Meiji restoration, the area was the center of the 1874 Saga Rebellion, and a battle between the government troops and the rebel army occurred on Mount Asahi. The villages Asahi, Fumoto, Kizato, Tashiro and Todoroki were created on April 1, 1889 with the establishment of the modern municipalities system. Todoroki was elevated to town status on March 19, 1907 and renamed Tosu. Tashiro was elevated to town status on March 11, 1936. On April 1, 1954 Tosu merged with Tashiro and the villages of Asahi, Fumoto and Kizato and was raised to city status.

== Government ==
Tosu has a mayor-council form of government with a directly elected mayor and a unicameral city council of 22 members. Tosu contributes three members to the Saga Prefectural Assembly. In terms of national politics, the city is part of the Saga 1st district of the lower house of the Diet of Japan.

== Economy ==
Tosu is a regional commercial center and logistics and distribution hub, due to its location at the intersection of several major highways and rail line. The local economy remains centered on agriculture, food processing and light manufacturing. Hisamitsu Pharmaceutical is headquartered in Tosu.

== Education ==
Tosu has eight public elementary schools and five public junior high schools operated by the city government, and three public high schools operated by the Saga Prefectural Board of Education.

=== Junior colleges ===
- Kyushu Ryukoku Junior College

=== Senior high schools ===
- Tosu Commercial High School
- Tosu Senior High School
- Tosu Technical High School

=== Junior high schools ===
- Kizato Junior High School
- Kounan Junior High School
- Tashiro Junior High School
- Tosu Junior High School
- Tosu Nishi Junior High School

=== Elementary schools ===
- Asahi Elementary School
- Fumoto Elementary School
- Kizato Elementary School
- Tashiro Elementary School
- Tosu Elementary School
- Tosu Kita Elementary School
- Wakaba Elementary School
- Yayoigaoka Elementary School

== Transport ==
Tosu is one of the major transportation hubs of Kyushu. Its main train station is Tosu Station which connects the Nagasaki Main Line and the Kagoshima Main Line. There is also a junction connecting the Kyūshū Expressway, Nagasaki Expressway and Ōita Expressway. Economically it is part of the Fukuoka metropolitan area, and according to a 2000 census about 5% of the total population of Tosu commute to work or school in Fukuoka.

=== Rail ===
JR Kyushu - Kyushu Shinkansen

Shin-Tosu

JR Kyushu - Kagoshima Main Line

JB Yayoigaoka - Tashiro - Tosu - Hizen-Asahi

JR Kyushu - Nagasaki Main Line

JH Tosu - Shin-Tosu - Hizen-Fumoto

=== Highways ===
- Kyushu Expressway (Tosu Junction and Tosu Interchange)
- Nagasaki Expressway (Tosu Junction and Tosu Interchange)
- Ōita Expressway (Tosu Junction)
- National Route 3
- National Route 34
- National Route 500

== Sister cities ==
- Zeitz, Saxony-Anhalt, Germany.

== Local attractions ==
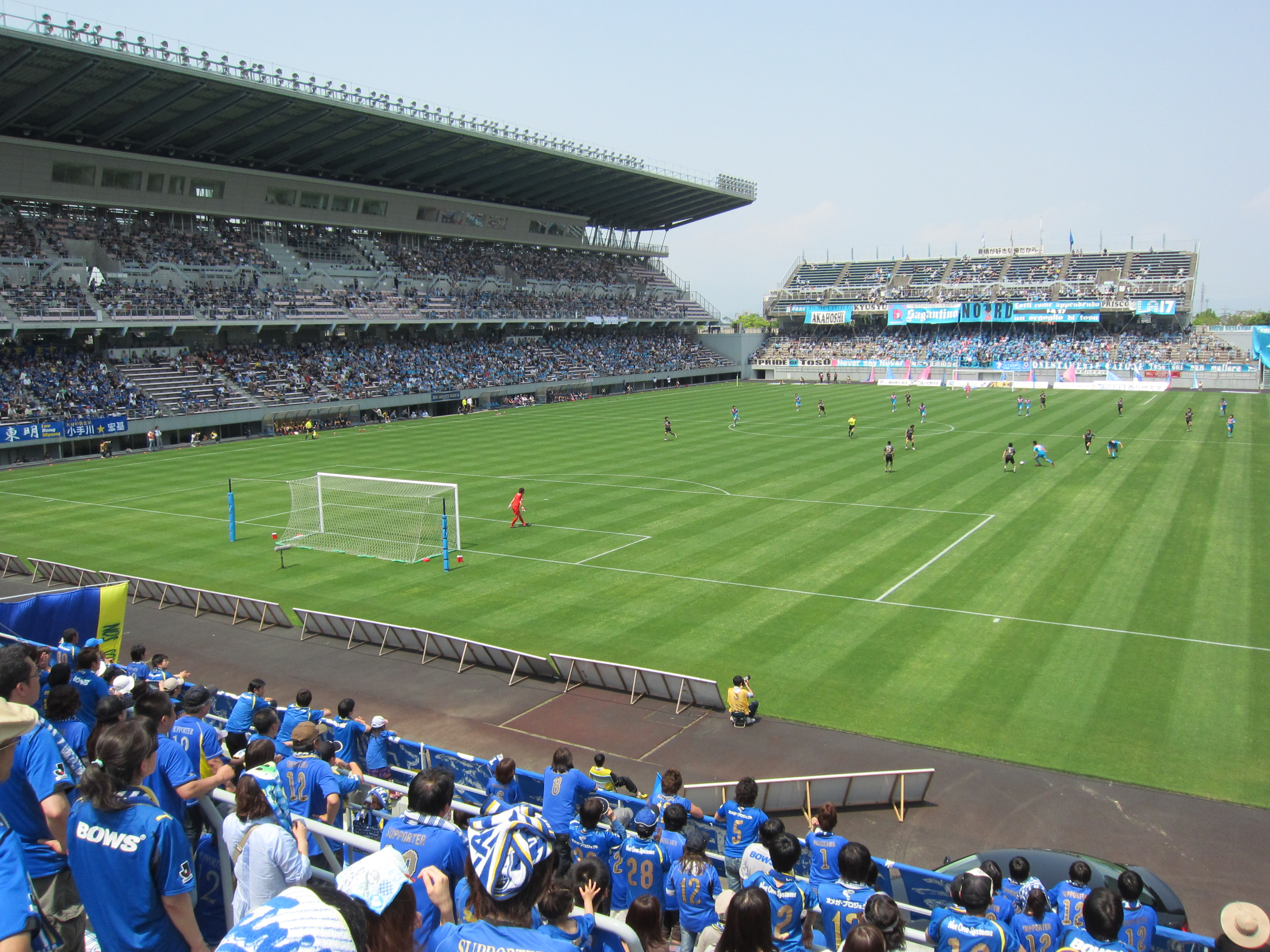
Tosu Football Stadium

- Best Amenity Stadium
- Katsunoo Castle ruins
- Mount Asahi castle ruins
- Tashiroōta Kofun
- Yasunagata Site

=== Sightseeing spots ===
- Azumaya
- Kawachi Dam area
  - Torigoe and Yamabiko mountain retreats
  - Shimin no mori
  - Kawachi swimming pool
- Mount Asahi Park
- Mount Kusenbu
  - Kyushu Nature Walk
- Nakatomi Commemorative Medicine Museum
- Ochōzu waterfall
  - Numakawa swimming pool
- Saga racecourse
- Tashiro Park
- Tosu Premium Outlets

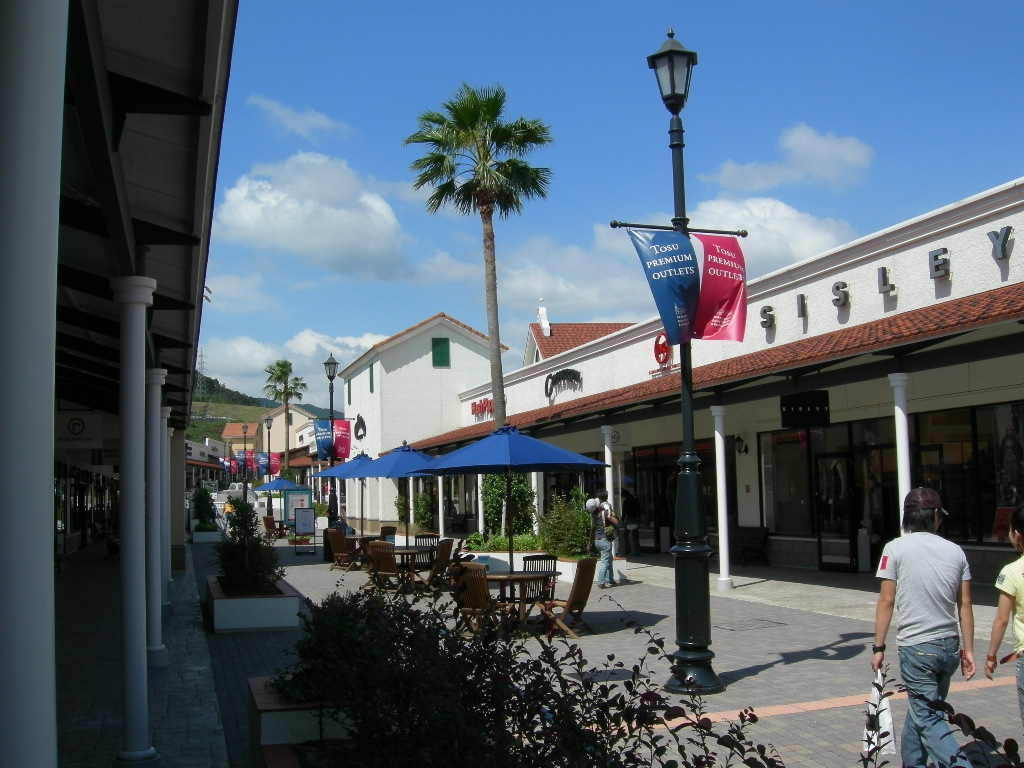
Tosu Premium Outlets

=== Festivals and events ===
- Tosu Yayoi Matsuri (last Sunday of March)
- Hana no hi (May 4)
- Tori no hi (Sunday between May 10 and May 16)
- Matsuri Tosu (last Sunday of July)
- Tosu Yamakasa (first Saturday and Sunday of summer vacation)
- Doyō Yoichi (Saturday night market, end of July)

== Sports ==
- Hisamitsu Springs - in V. League volleyball
- Sagan Tosu - in J. League football
- Yuka Kobayashi - in Girls Keirin keirin

== Notable people from Tosu ==
- Yuga Kawada - jockey
- Koichi Ogata - pro baseball player
- Masayoshi Son - businessman, founder of SoftBank
