= Mount Sefuri =

Mountain in Fukuoka and Saga, Japan

- 脊振山
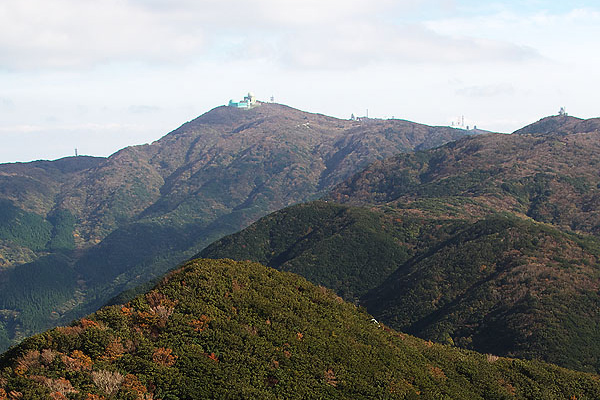
- Mount Sefuri as seen from the west

Highest point
- Elevation: 1,054.6 m (3,460 ft)
- Listing: List of mountains and hills of Japan by height
- Coordinates: 33°26′11″N 130°22′7″E

Naming
- Language of name: Japanese
- Pronunciation: [seɸɯɾisaɴ]

Geography
- Location within Japan
- Location: Kyūshū, Japan
- Parent range: Sefuri Mountains

Geology
- Mountain type: massif

Mount Sefuri (脊振山, Sefuri-san) is a 1,054.6 m (3,460 ft) peak of the Sefuri Mountains, which are located on the border of Fukuoka, Fukuoka Prefecture, and Kanzaki, Saga Prefecture, Japan.

== Outline ==
This mountain is the tallest peak of the Sefuri Mountain range between Fukuoka Prefecture and Saga Prefecture on the island of Kyūshū. Before the Meiji Restoration, this mountain was a center of the Shugendō religion in this region, along with Mount Hiko. Mount Sefuri is the location where the Buddhist priest Eisai first planted tea after his return to Japan from Song dynasty China in the Kamakura period.

== Facilities ==
On the top of Mount Sefuri, there is a military site, a radar site operated by the Japan Air Self-Defense Force. The communications station operated by the United States Air Force in Japan was closed in 1991.

== Routes ==
The most popular route to climb this mountain is from Shiiba Bus Stop of Nishitetsu Bus. It takes about from two and half hours to three hours to the top.

== Gallery ==
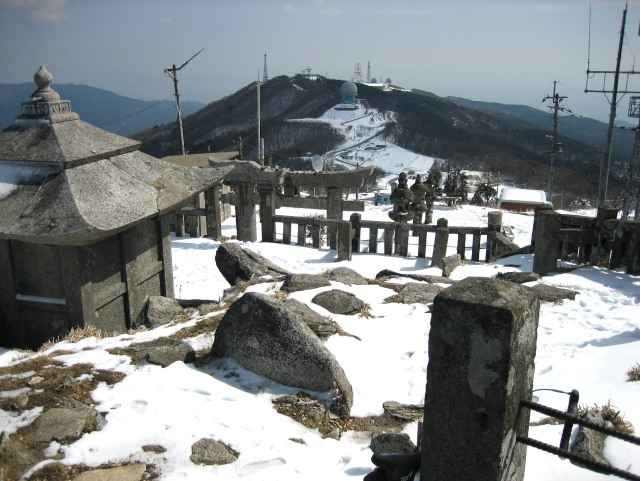
From summit

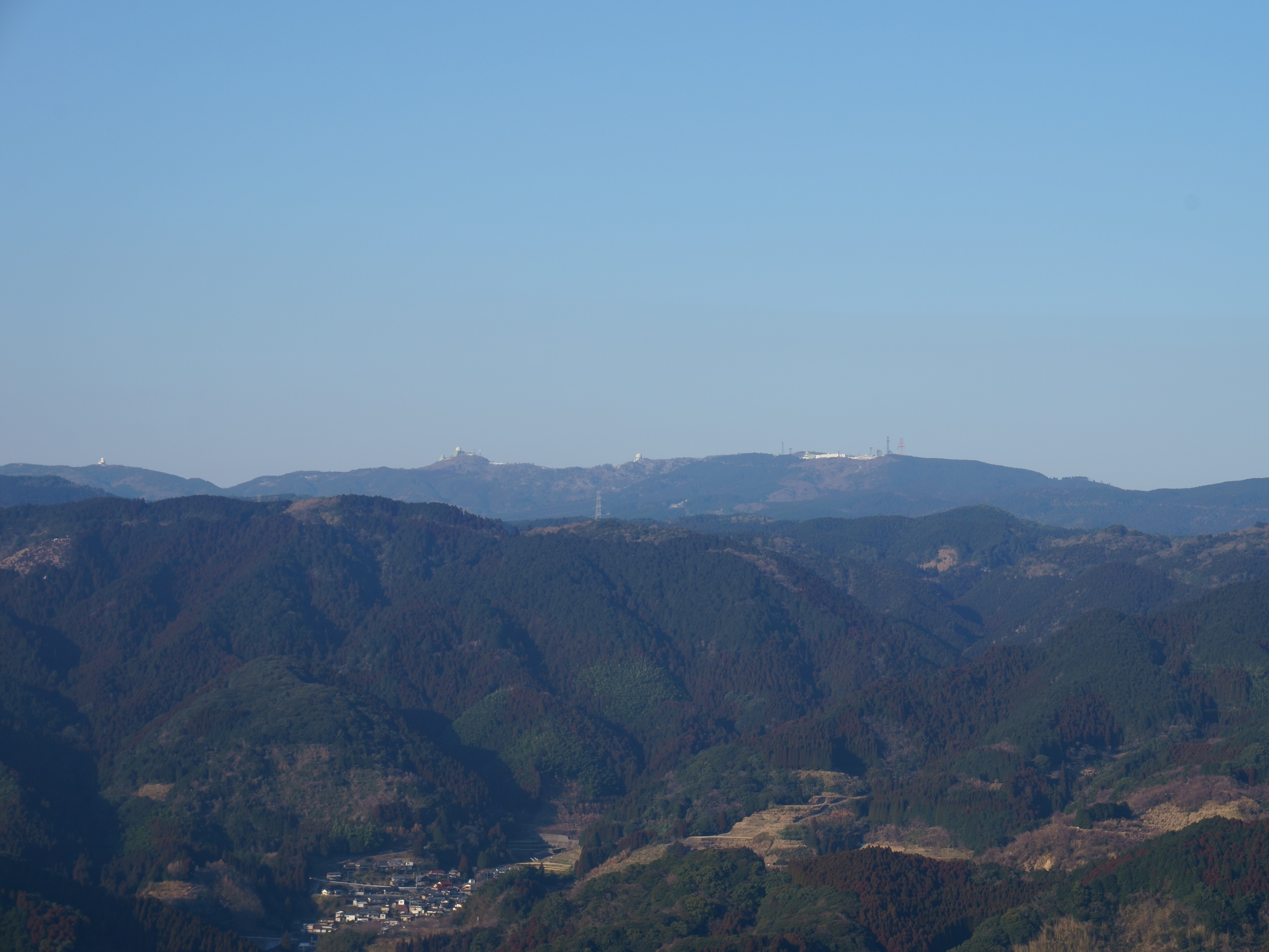
Mount Sefuri's main ridge seen from the SSW in the inmost
