= Haji pottery =

Japanese pottery

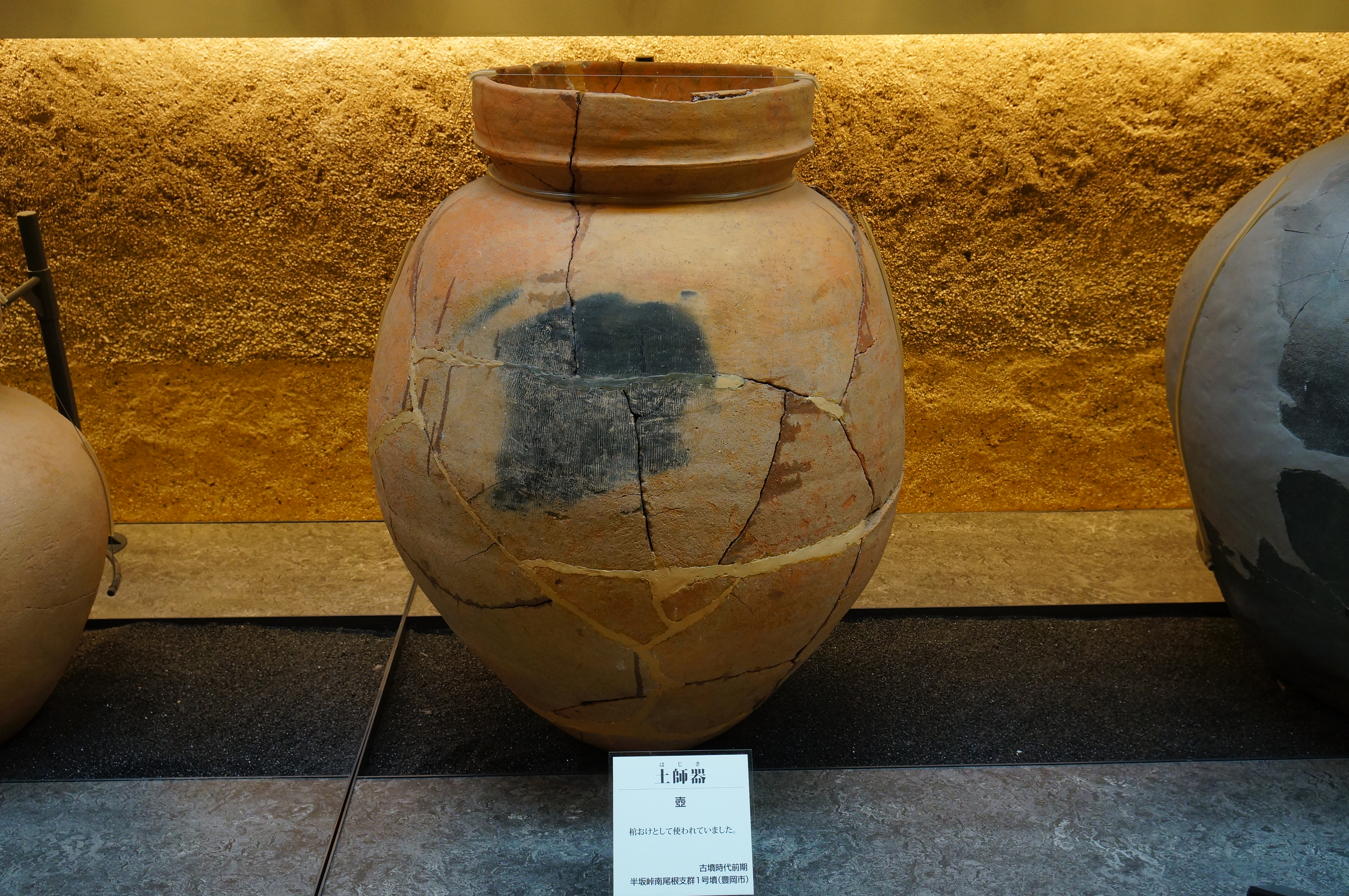
Large Haji pottery jar

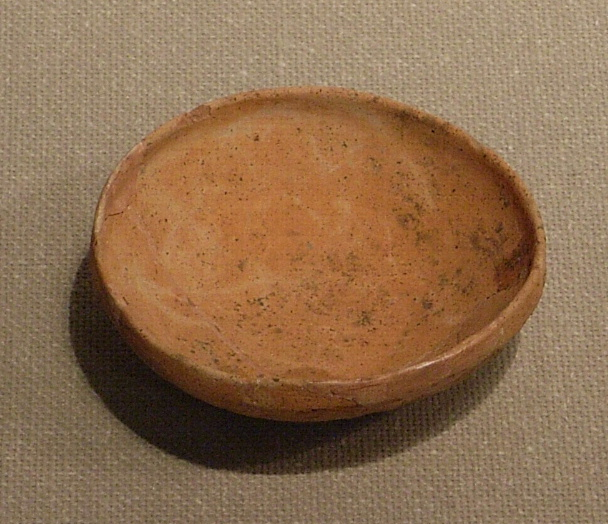
Haji plate, Kōriyama site, Sendai, Miyagi

Haji pottery (土師器, Hajiki) is a type of plain, unglazed, reddish-brown Japanese pottery or earthenware that was produced during the Kofun, Nara, and Heian periods of Japanese history. It was used for both ritual and utilitarian purposes, and many examples have been found in Japanese tombs, where they form part of the basis of dating archaeological sites.

== History ==
Haji ware evolved in the 4th century AD (during the Tumulus period) from the Yayoi pottery of the preceding period. The ornate decorations of Yayoi pottery were replaced by a plain, undecorated style, and the shapes began to become standardized. Great amounts of this pottery were produced by dedicated craft workshops in what later became the provinces of Yamato and Kawachi, and spread from there throughout western Japan, eventually reaching the eastern provinces. Some Haji ware pottery has been found in the enormous tombs of the Japanese emperors. By the end of the 5th century, Haji pottery was imitating Sue ware forms.

Also during this time, the Haniwa clay figurines were produced.

In the Nara period, Haji ware was often burnished and smoke-blackened by being fired in an oxygen-reduction atmosphere but at low temperatures. This sub-style is known as kokushoku-doki.

Haji ware came to an end with the development of glazes and ceramics in the late Heian period.

During a 2007 underwater archaeology survey on Ojikajima by the Asian Research Institute of Underwater Archaeology, examples of Chinese ceramics and Haji ware were recovered.

== Characteristics ==
Haji ware is typically a rust-red pottery, made of clay that was built up in rings or coils, rather than being thrown on a potter's wheel. The exterior and usually the interior surfaces were finished by scraping smooth with a piece of wood. It was fired at temperatures below 1000 deg C in surface fires or oxidizing fires rather than kilns.

Most of Haji ware is undecorated and has wide rims. However, ritual and funerary objects were also made in the form of houses, boats, animals, women, hunters, musicians, and warriors, which were often placed inside tombs On occasion, these objects were placed outside the tomb to guard it. One pot that was found at an archaeological site in Hachiōji, Tokyo has a globular body, averted mouth, rounded base, solid triangular handle, painted in dark grey pigment on one side with a human face painted on the front.
