= Balloon Saga Station =

Railway station in Saga, Saga Prefecture, Japan

Coordinates: 33°15′28″N 130°14′56″E

Balloon Saga Station バルーンさが駅
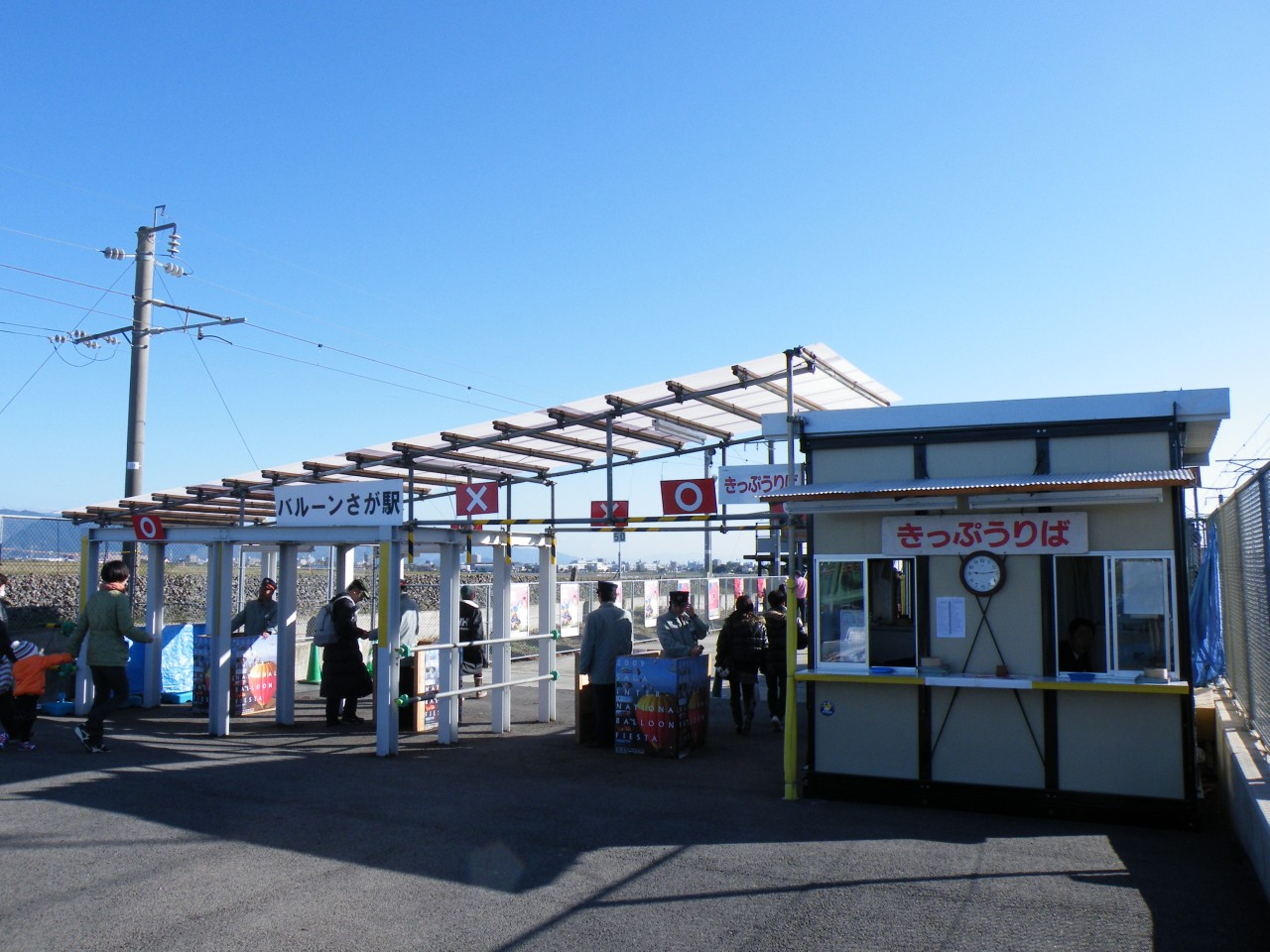
- The station entrance in November 2009

General information
- Location: Ogino, Kasemachi, Saga-shi, Saga-ken 840-0864; Japan
- Operator: JR Kyushu
- Line: ■ Nagasaki Main Line
- Distance: 29.8 km from Tosu
- Platforms: 2 side platforms
- Tracks: 2

Other information
- Status: Seasonal operation

History
- Opened: 18 November 1989
Location
- Location within Saga Prefecture Location within Japan

Balloon Saga Station (バルーンさが駅, Barūn-Saga-eki) is a railway station on the Nagasaki Main Line in Saga, Saga Prefecture, Japan, operated by Kyushu Railway Company (JR Kyushu). It is a seasonal station and is only operational during the Saga International Balloon Fiesta (held around the end of October/beginning of November).

== Layout ==
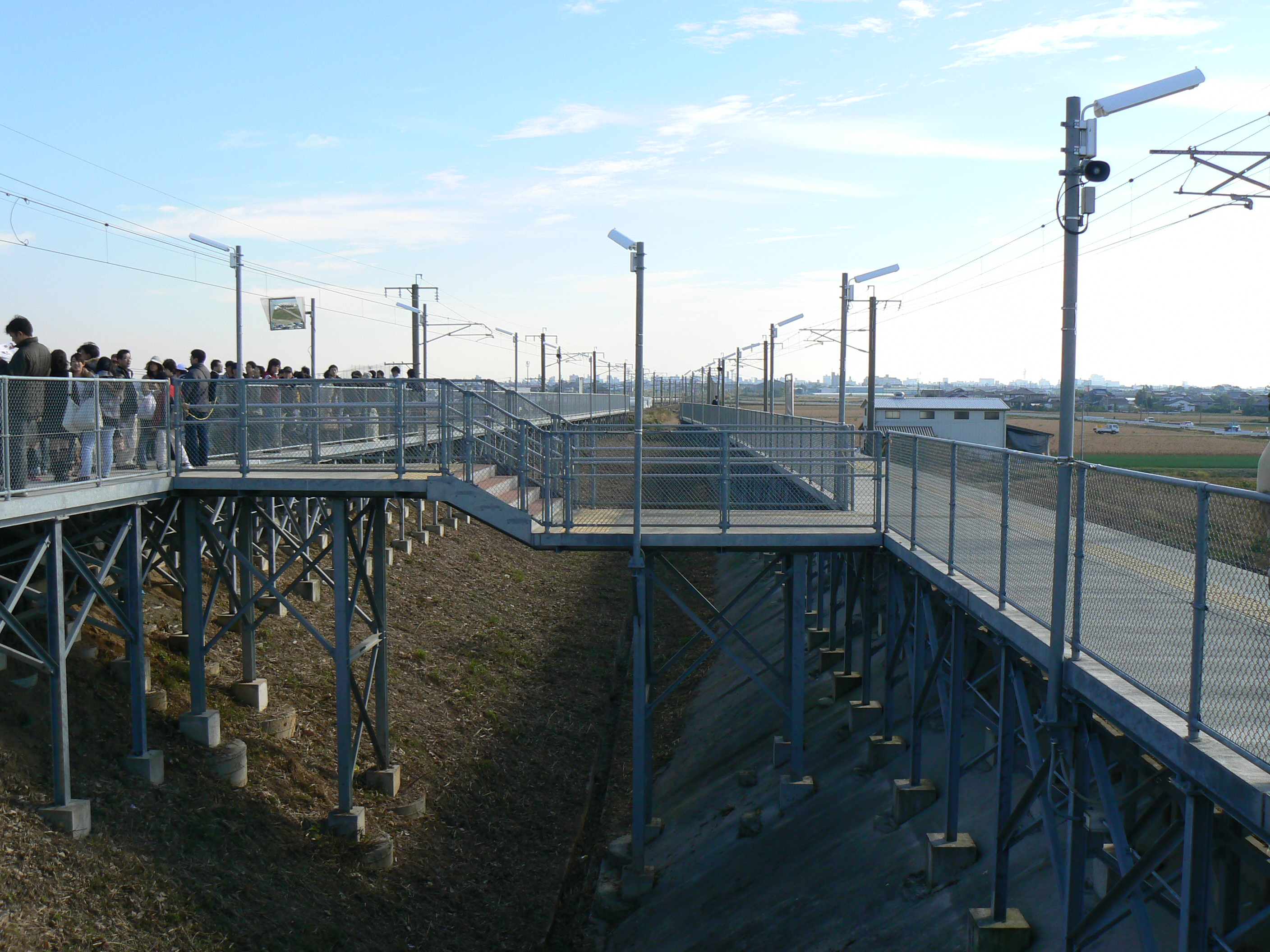
The platforms in November 2007

The station consists of two outward-facing side platforms serving two tracks. The two platforms are linked by walkways.

== Adjacent stations ==
| « | Service | » |
Nagasaki Main Line
| Kubota | - | Nabeshima |

== History ==
The station opened on 18 November 1989. Permanent platform structures were built in 2002.

== Surrounding area ==
The station lies east of the Kase River and mainly surrounded by fields, with few homes or businesses in the area. The Saga International Balloon Fiesta brings many tourists to the area. National Route 34 (Saga Bypass) lies 1 km to the north.

== See also ==
- List of railway stations in Japan
- Saga International Balloon Fiesta
