= Kanzaki Station (Saga) =

Railway station in Kanzaki, Saga Prefecture, Japan

JH 06 Kanzaki Station 神埼駅
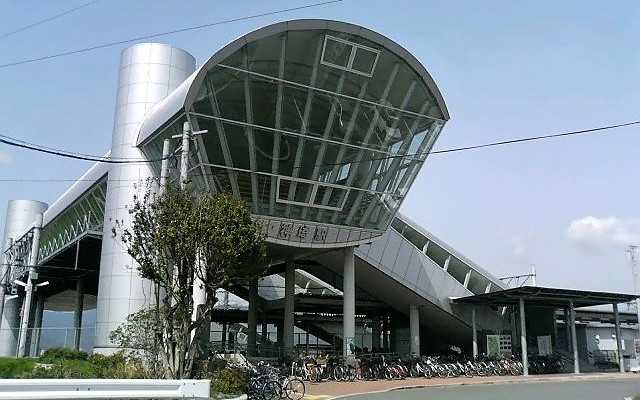
- Kanzaki Station in 2006

General information
- Location: Kanzakimachi Tamichigari, Kanzaki-shi, Saga-ken 842-0002; Japan
- Coordinates: 33°18′57″N 130°22′30″E
- Operator: JR Kyushu
- Line: JH Nagasaki Main Line
- Distance: 15.7 km from Tosu
- Platforms: 1 side + 1 island platforms
- Tracks: 3

Construction
- Structure type: At grade
- Cycle facilities: Bike shed
- Accessible: Yes - elevators available

Other information
- Status: Staff ticket window (outsourced)
- Website: Official website

History
- Opened: 20 August 1891
- Former names: Kanzaki (神崎) (different kanji, until 1 November 1907); Kanzaki (神埼) (present name, until 1 May 1945); Hizen-Kanzaki (肥前神埼) (until 10 April 1956)

Passengers
- FY2022: 1,274 daily
- Rank: 116th (among JR Kyushu stations)

Services
Preceding station	JR Kyushu	Following station
Igaya towards Nagasaki	Nagasaki Line	Yoshinogari-Kōen towards Tosu
Location
- Location within Saga Prefecture Location within Japan

Kanzaki Station (神埼駅, Kanzaki-eki) is a passenger railway station located in the city of Kanzaki, Saga Prefecture, Japan. It is operated by JR Kyushu and is on the Nagasaki Main Line.

== Lines ==
The station is served by the Nagasaki Main Line and is located 15.7 km from the starting point of the line at Tosu.

== Station layout ==
The station consists of a side platform and an island platform serving three tracks. The station building is a modern design built of steel and glass and is an elevated structure where the passenger facilities such as the ticket window and waiting area are housed in a bridge which spans the tracks. From the station forecourt on the south side of the tracks, there is, in addition to steps, a ramp which leads to an elevator which gives access to the facilities on the bridge. Besides a flight of steps, the island platform is also served by an elevator from the bridge. Platform 1 (the side platform) is not served by an elevator but there is a direct entrance from the station forecourt which staff can open for wheelchair users. It is also possible to enter the station bridge structure from the north side of the tracks using steps or an elevator.

Management of the station has been outsourced to the JR Kyushu Tetsudou Eigyou Co., a wholly owned subsidiary of JR Kyushu specialising in station services. It staffs the ticket window which is equipped with a POS machine but does not have a Midori no Madoguchi facility.

=== Platforms ===
1	■ JH Nagasaki Main Line	for Saga and Nagasaki
2	■ JH Nagasaki Main Line	for Tosu

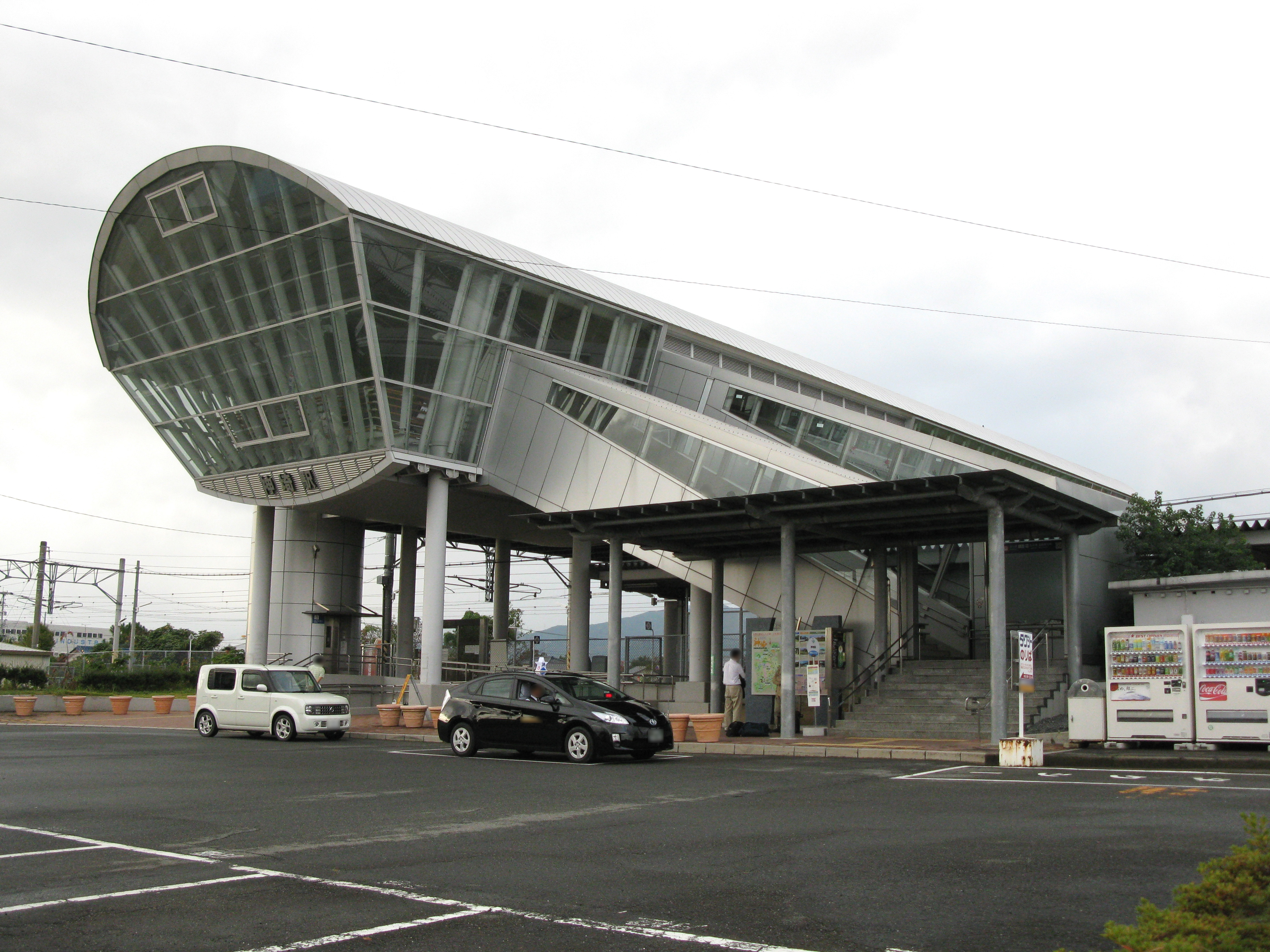
A view of the main (south) entrance of the station. Note the ramp which leads to an elevator and the direct entrance to platform 1.

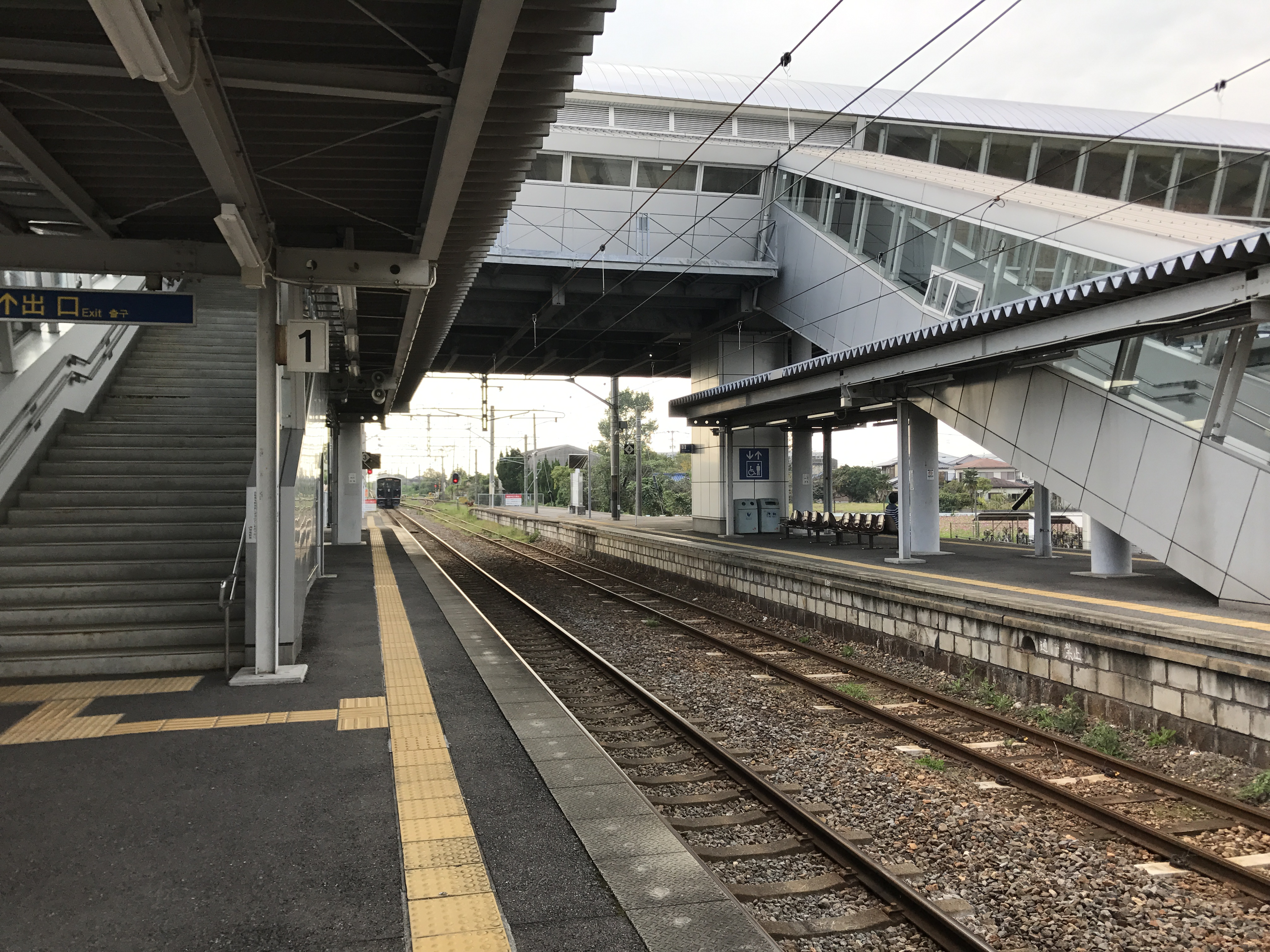
A view of the platforms and tracks from platform 1. Note the elevator serving platforms 2 and 3.

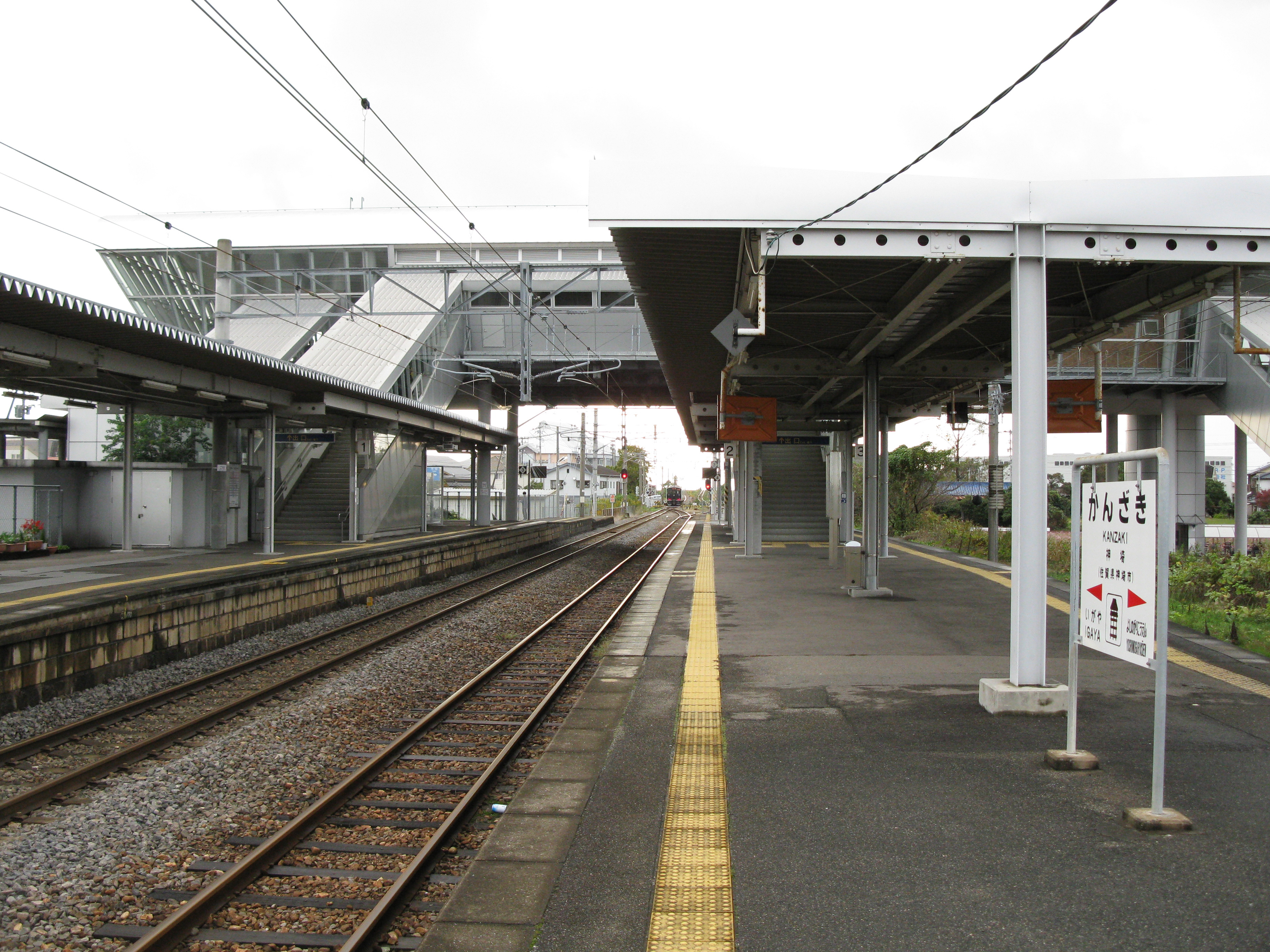
A view from platform 2. Note the direct entrance to platform 1 which is located near the base of the steps.

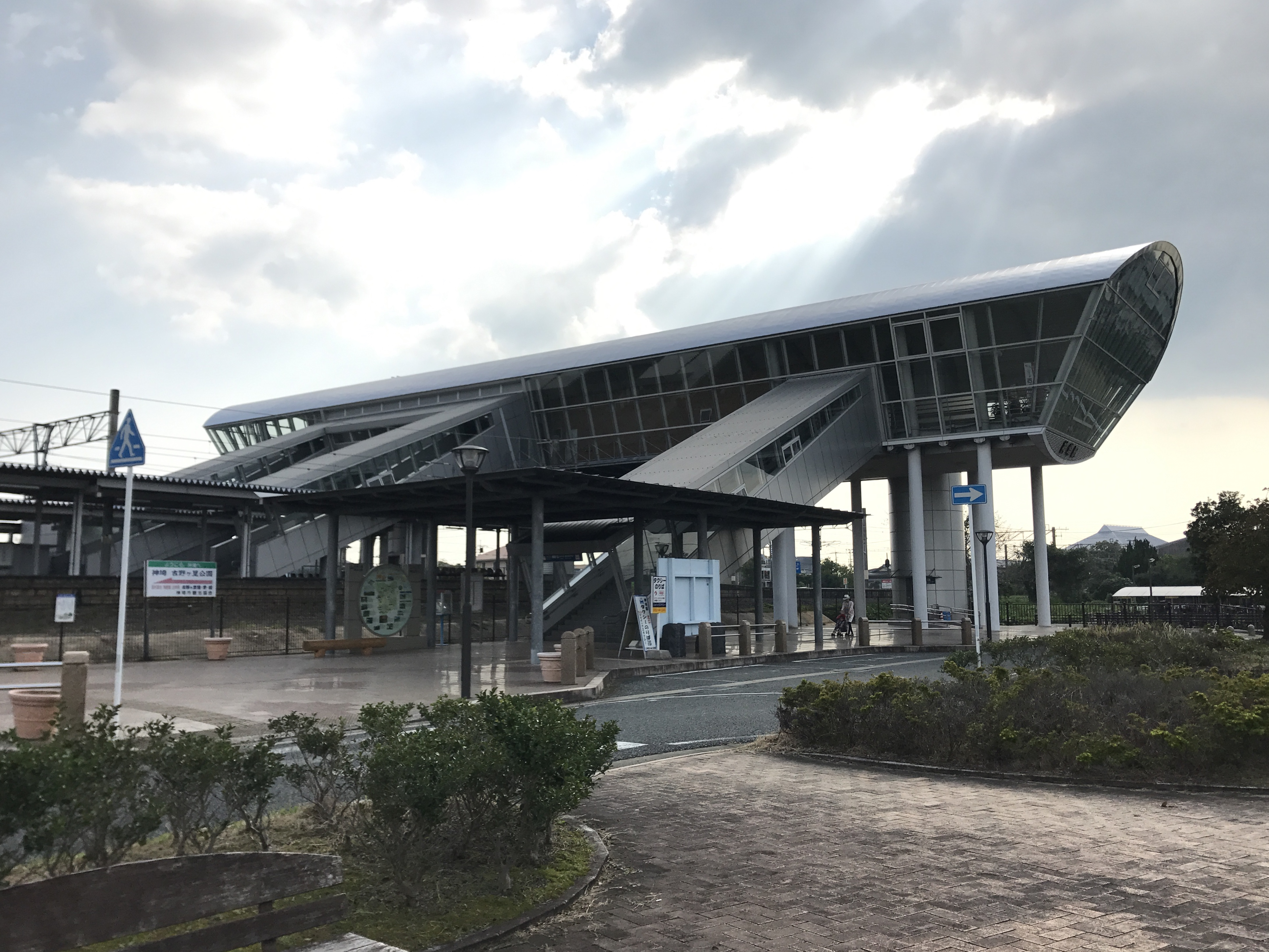
The north entrance to the station. Note the steps and elevator shaft.

== History ==
The station was opened with the name Kanzaki (神崎) (a different second word in kanji but the same reading) on 20 August 1891 by the private Kyushu Railway as an intermediate station on a stretch of track which it laid from Tosu to Saga. When the Kyushu Railway was nationalized on 1 July 1907, Japanese Government Railways (JGR) took over control of the station. On 1 November 1907, the station name was changed to Kanzaki (神埼). On 12 October 1909, the station became part of the Nagasaki Main Line. On 1 May 1945 the station name was changed to Hizen-Kanzaki (肥前神埼) and on 10 April 1956 back to Kanzaki (神埼) again. With the privatization of Japanese National Railways (JNR), the successor of JGR, on 1 April 1987, control of the station passed to JR Kyushu and JR Freight. Freight services were discontinued on 22 May 1997.

== Passenger statistics ==
In fiscal 2020, the station was used by an average of 1,274 passengers daily (boarding passengers only), and it ranked 116th among the busiest stations of JR Kyushu.

== Surrounding area ==
- Kanzaki City Hall
- Saga Prefectural Kanzaki High School
- Japan National Route 34
- Kanzaki Junior High School
- Yoshinogari Ruins
- Kanzaki Onsen

== See also ==
- List of railway stations in Japan
