= Hizen Provincial Capital =

Archaeological site in Saga, Japan

Coordinates: 33°19′1.0″N 130°16′26.4″E

Hizen Provincial Capital Site
- 肥前国庁跡 (Japanese)
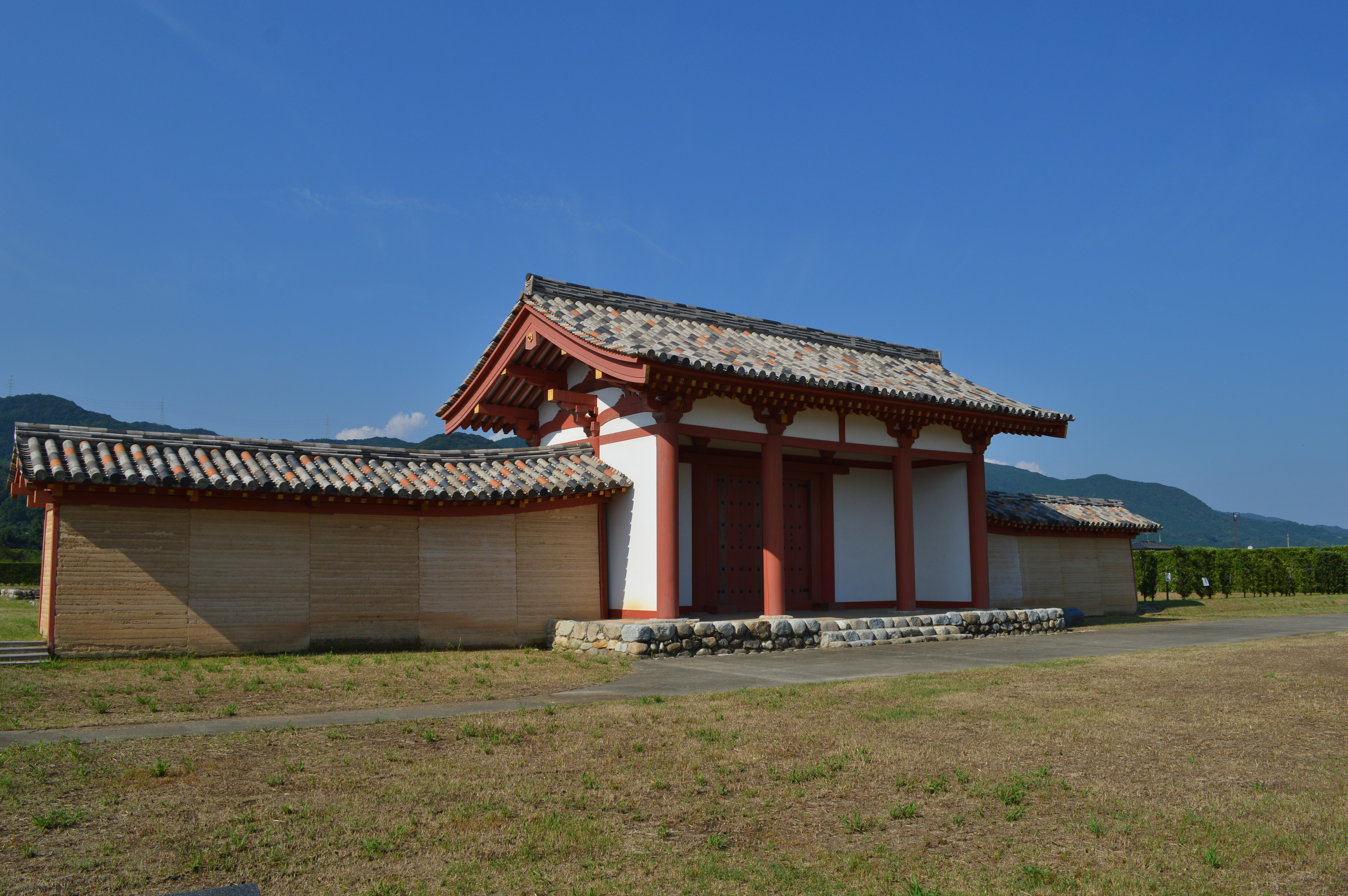
- Hizen Provincial Capital Site

- Hizen Provincial Capital Site Hizen Provincial Capital (Japan)
- Interactive map of Hizen Provincial Capital Site
- Type: Settlement
- Location: Saga, Saga, Japan
- Region: Kyushu

History
- Built: Nara - Heian period

Site notes
- Condition: ruins
- Public access: Yes (museum)

The Hizen Provincial Capital site (肥前国庁跡, Hizen Kokuchō ato) is an archaeological site consisting of the ruins of the Nara period to early Heian period Provincial Capital of Hizen Province, located in the Yamato neighborhood of the city of Saga, San'yō region of Japan. The site was designated a National Historic Site of Japan in 1989.

== Overview ==
Following the Taika Reform (645 AD) which aimed at a centralization of the administration following the Chinese model (ritsuryō), provincial capitals were established in the various provinces, headed by an official titled kokushi, who replaced the older Kuni no miyatsuko. With a square layout, the provincial capitals were patterned after the Capital of Japan, first Fujiwara-kyō and then Heijō-kyō, which in turn were modelled on the Tang capital Chang'an, but on a much, much smaller scale. Each had office buildings for administration, finance, police and military and the official building of the governor, as well as granaries for tax rice and other taxable produce. In the periphery there was the provincial temple (kokubun-ji), and nunnery (kokubun-niji) and the garrison. This system collapsed with the growth of feudalism in the Late Heian period, and the location of many of the provincial capitals is now lost.

The Hizen Provincial Capital was located on an alluvial terrace formed by the Kase River, which originates in the Sefuri Mountains in the western part of the Chikushi Plain. Archaeological excavations were carried out over a ten-year period starting in 1975, and the scale and internal structure of the provincial office from the early 8th century to the early 10th century has become clear. The provincial office measured 77.2 meters east-to-west and 104.5 meters north-to-south. Only the foundations of the south gate has been discovered, which measured approximately 9.7 by 5.3 meters and was 6.8 meters tall. It has been rebuilt twice, initially as a post-hole building but eventually converted into a stone-foundation building. All the buildings discovered within the provincial office grounds are post-hole buildings. Relics discovered include a large amount of earthenware such as sue ware and haji ware, as well as roof tiles. Although some pottery dating from the latter half of the 7th century has been excavated, the overwhelming majority of the remains are from the 8th century, especially the latter half, with not many from the 9th or 10th centuries. The layout of the buildings resembles that of the Dazaifu complex on a smaller scale, with the front hall, main hall, and rear hall lined up on the central north–south axis, and two side halls are located on each side of the front hall. Corridors are attached to the east and west of the main hall, dividing the bailey into north and south, and the south gate is an eight-legged gate that bends the embankment inward. Currently, the site has been developed as a park, and the south gate and earthen walls (10 meters on both wings) have been restored. There is also a museum on site.

Around the Hizen Provincial Office ruins, there are numerous other contemporary ruins, including the foundations for a cluster of buildings thought to be the taxation storehouses, buildings thought to be the provincial governor's residence, and a government office-related building group consisting of three long podium-based buildings.

== See also ==
- List of Historic Sites of Japan (Saga)
