= Igaya Station =

Railway station in Saga, Saga Prefecture, Japan

JH 07 Igaya Station 伊賀屋駅
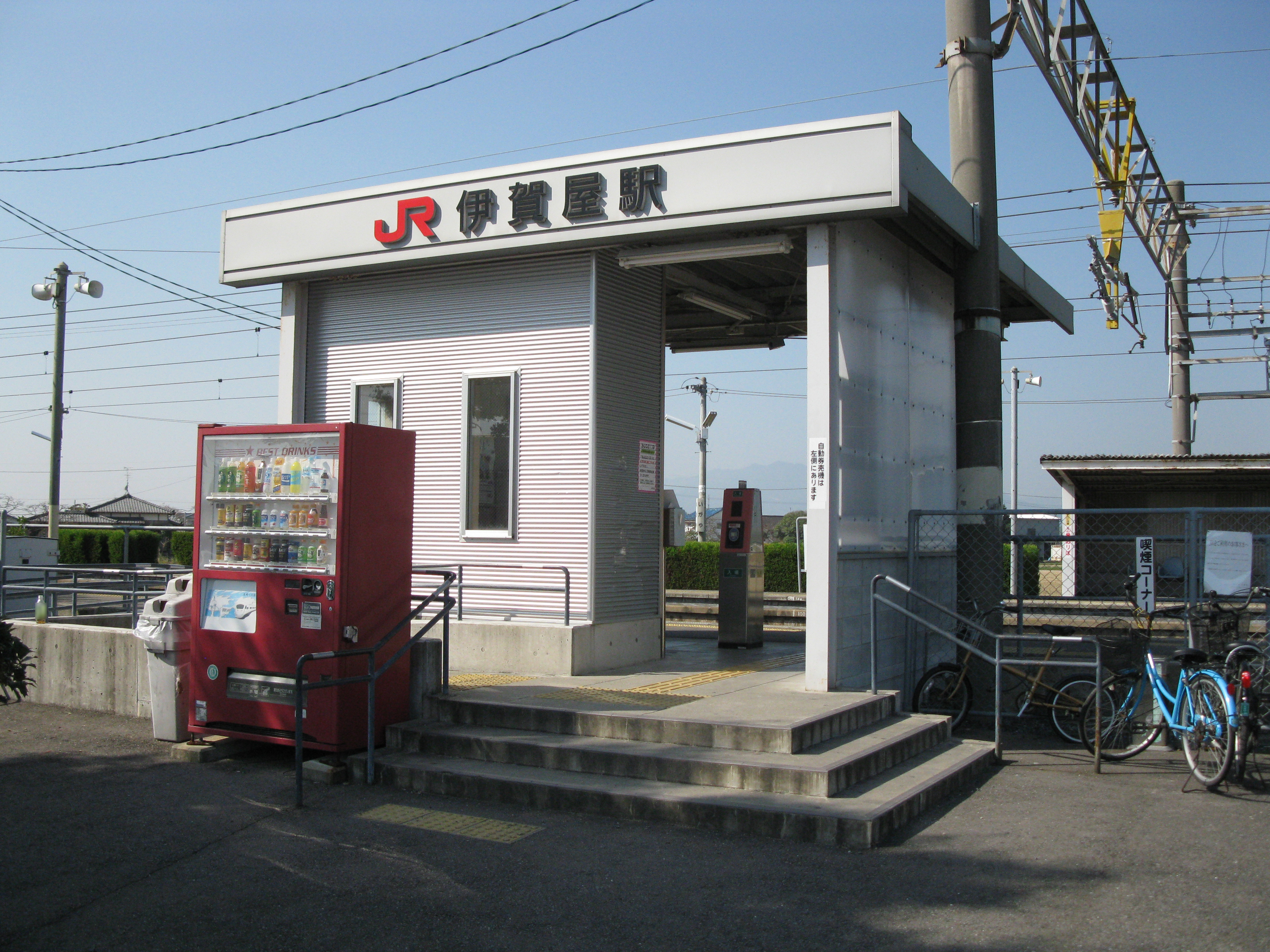
- Igaya Station in 2009

General information
- Location: 1740 Wakamiya Hyōgomachi, Saga-shi, Saga-ken 849-0911; Japan
- Coordinates: 33°17′24″N 130°20′13″E
- Operator: JR Kyushu
- Line: JH Nagasaki Main Line
- Distance: 20.2 km from Tosu
- Platforms: 2 side platforms
- Tracks: 2

Construction
- Structure type: At grade

Other information
- Status: Unstaffed
- Website: Official website

History
- Opened: 1 December 1928

Passengers
- FY2011: 253 daily

Services
Preceding station	JR Kyushu	Following station
Saga towards Nagasaki	Nagasaki Line	Kanzaki towards Tosu
Location
- Location within Saga Prefecture Location within Japan

Igaya Station (伊賀屋駅, Igaya-eki) is a passenger railway station located in the Hyōgo neighborhood of the city of Saga, Saga Prefecture, Japan. It is operated by JR Kyushu and is on the Nagasaki Main Line.

== Lines ==
The station is served by the Nagasaki Main Line and is located 20.2 km from the starting point of the line at Tosu.

== Station layout ==
The station, which is unstaffed, consists of two side platforms serving two tracks. A small station building of simple concrete construction, serves as a waiting room and houses an automatic ticket vending machine. Access to the opposite side platform is by means of a footbridge.

=== Platforms ===
1	■ JH Nagasaki Main Line	for Saga and Nagasaki
2	■ JH Nagasaki Main Line	for Tosu

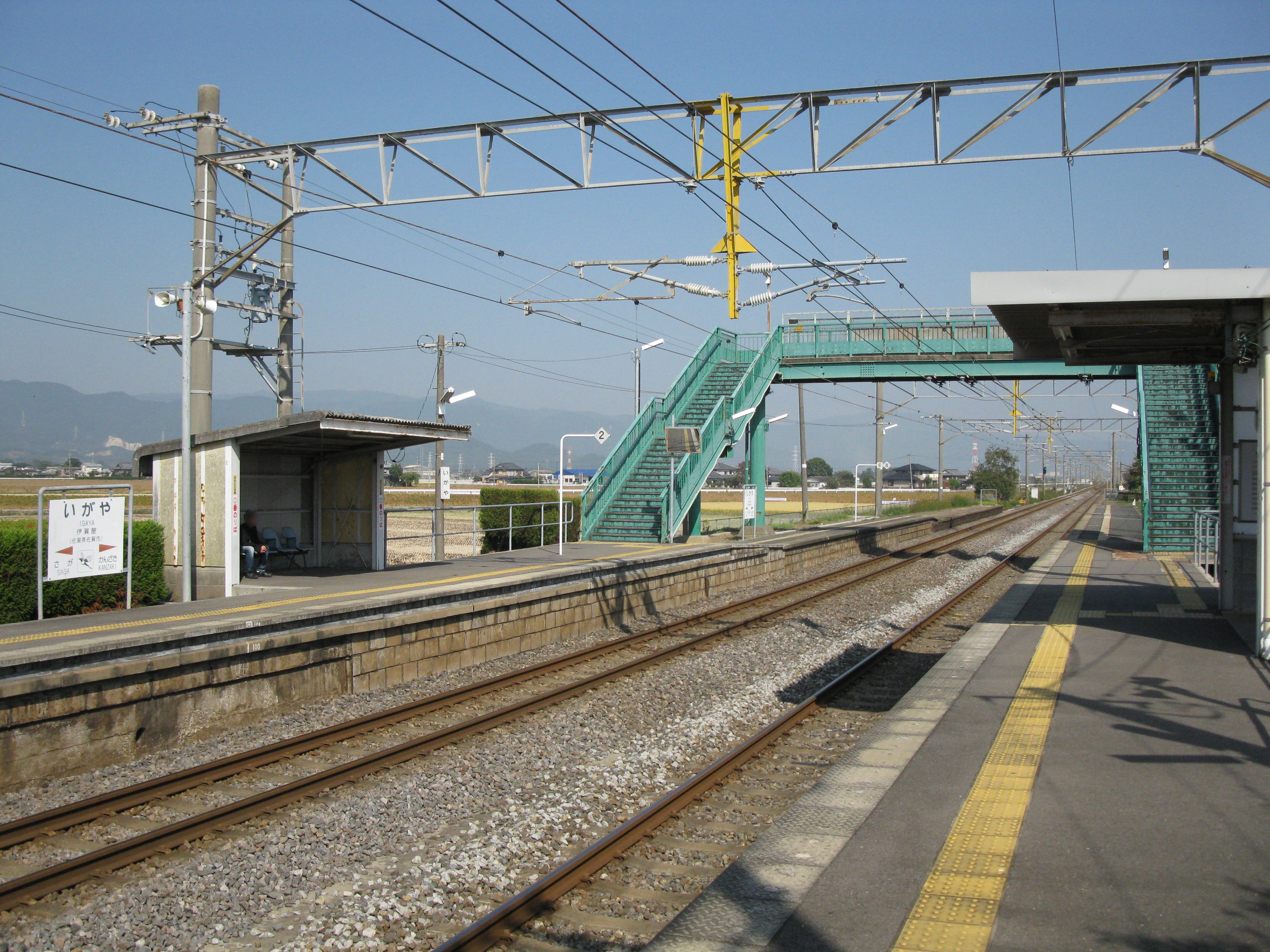
View of the platforms and tracks.

== History ==
Japanese Government Railways (JGR) opened the station on 1 December 1928 as an additional station on the existing track of the Nagasaki Main Line. With the privatization of Japanese National Railways (JNR), the successor of JGR, on 1 April 1987, control of the station passed to JR Kyushu.

== Passenger statistics ==
In fiscal 2011, the daily average number of passengers using the station (boarding passengers only) was 253.

== Surrounding area ==
- Saga Vocational Ability Development Promotion Center
- Igaya Tenman-gu

== See also ==
- List of railway stations in Japan
