= Saga International Balloon Fiesta =

Annual festival in Saga Prefecture, Japan

Saga International Balloon Fiesta 佐賀インターナショナルバルーンフェスタ
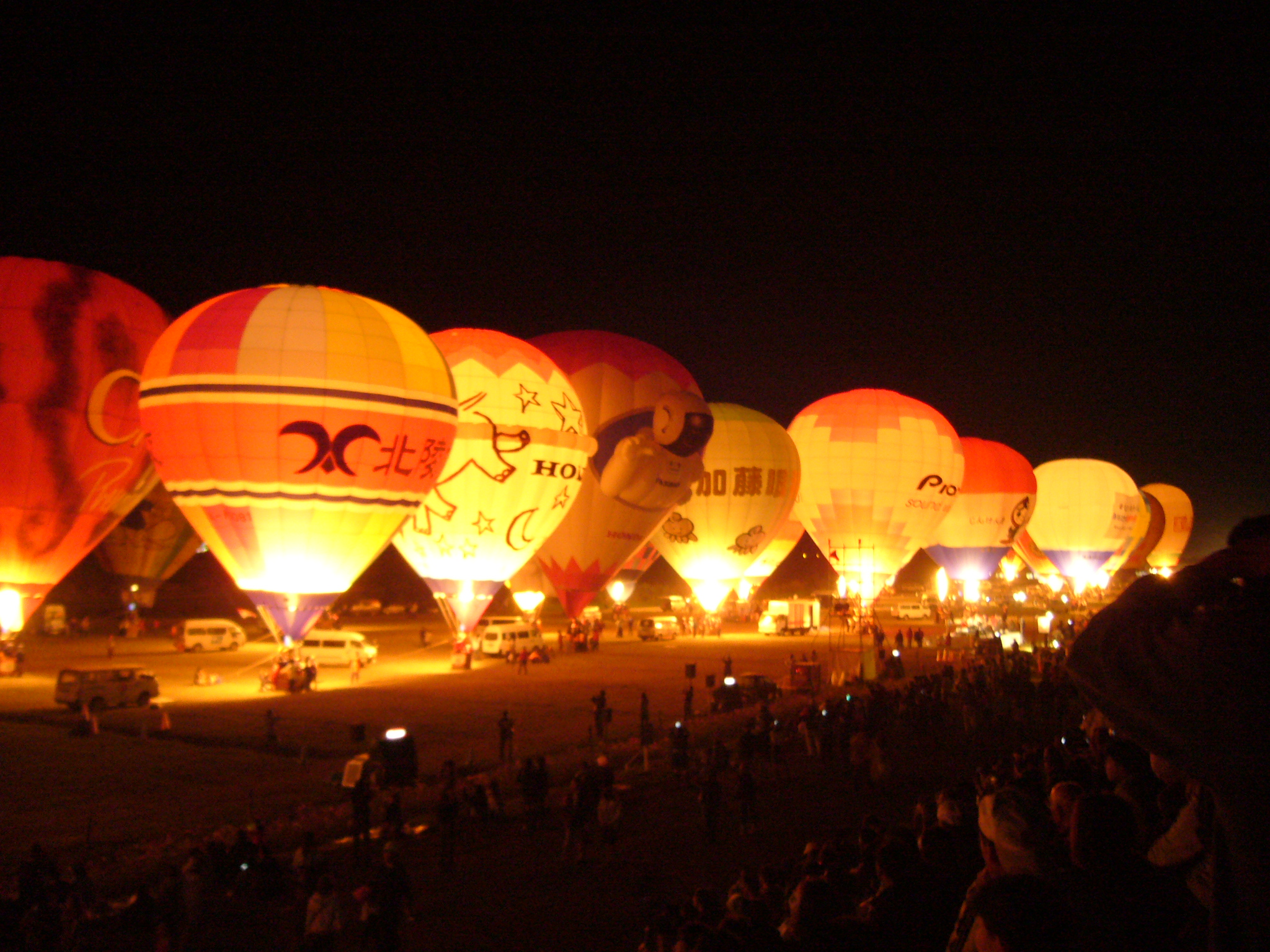
- Genre: Hot Air Balloon Festival
- Date: Late October–Early November
- Begins: 1978
- Frequency: Annually
- Venue: Kase River
- Locations: Saga, Saga
- Country: Japan
- Years active: 1978–1979 (in Amagi); 1980–present (in Saga)
- Previous event: 2023
- Next event: 2024
- Attendance: about 907,000 (2023)
- Area: Saga
- Website: www.sibf.jp

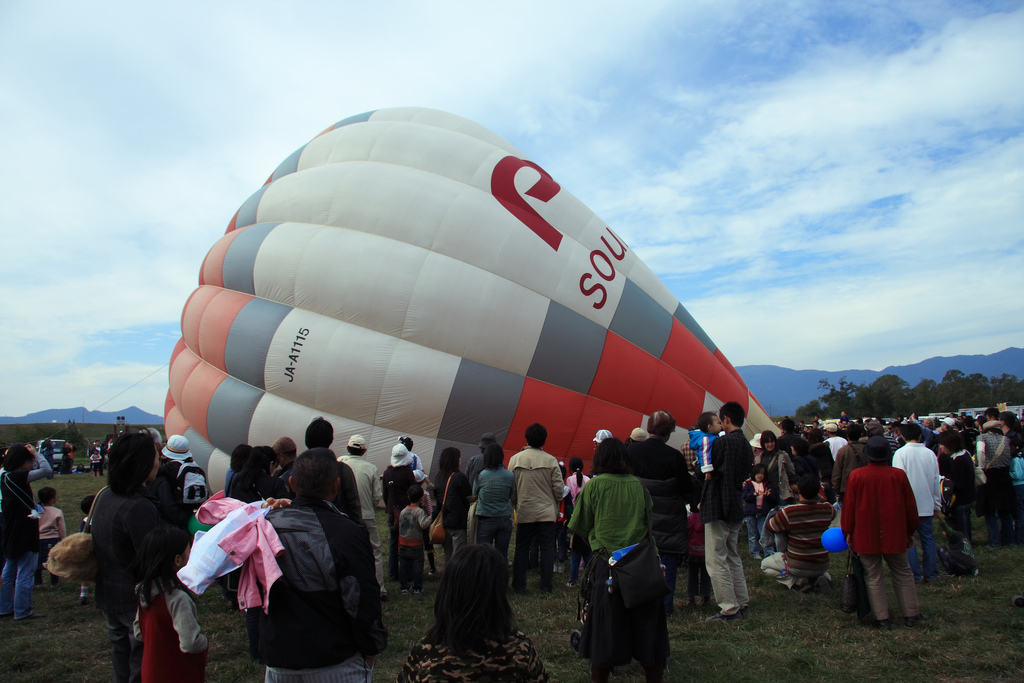

The Saga International Balloon Fiesta (佐賀インターナショナルバルーンフェスタ, Saga Intānashonaru Barūn Fesuta) is held at the beginning of November every year in Saga Prefecture, Japan. In 2014 it took place between October 30 and November 3.

The fiesta is held just outside Saga City, along the Kase River. It has grown from a gathering of 5 hot air balloons to a competition where over 3500 people volunteer, and has gained a reputation as one of the top ballooning competitions in the world. It is also a popular time for tourists as the Karatsu Kunchi Festival is held at the same time in Karatsu. Since 1980 the launch site has been visited by over 10 million spectators.

For the duration of the event, a temporary JR station (Balloon Saga Station) ferries passengers between Saga City and Kubota.

== History ==
The fiesta started in 1978 in Amagi City, Fukuoka Prefecture, as a smaller ballooning event, the Balloon Fiesta in Kyushu. In 1980 the Fiesta was moved to the outskirts of Saga City, where there is more room. In 1984 it became an international competition and was given its present name; in the same year the first Japanese National Hot Air Balloon Championship was held, and balloonists from all over Japan came to the grounds.

Since 1984 there have been approximately 640 balloons from overseas participants (nearly 3000 crew and pilots). In 1990 the first Pacific Championship was held in Saga. Between 1990 and 1996 women from around the world gathered to participate in the Ladies World Cup. Saga was the first place to have a competition of this kind.

Beginning in 1992 a category for special shaped balloons, called Balloon Fantasia was created. Also started at this time was the La Montgolfier Nocturne (The Night of Hot Air Balloons); tethered inflated balloons light their burners in a choreographed manner, illuminating their unique shapes. This is a highlight of the fiesta.

In November 1997 the 13th Hot Air Balloon World Championships were again held in Saga. With numbers rarely seen outside of the United States, this event was attended by over 38 countries and territories. There were 112 balloons present for the World Championship and together with the balloons that were competing in the Honda Grand Prix Final Battle, Balloon Fantasia, and official balloons there were 170 balloons flying through the skies of Saga.

In 1997, special days during the Fiesta were established for people to experience the balloons. These include Heartful Day, a day geared toward handicapped members of the community; and Kids Day, a hot air balloon classroom for children.

The fiesta was canceled for 2020, with the 2021 event taking place without spectators, and the 2022 event having spectators.

== See also ==
- Saga Ballooners
- Balloon Saga Station
- List of hot air balloon festivals
- World Hot Air Ballooning Championships
