= Mietsu Naval Dock =

- 三重津海軍所跡 (Japanese)
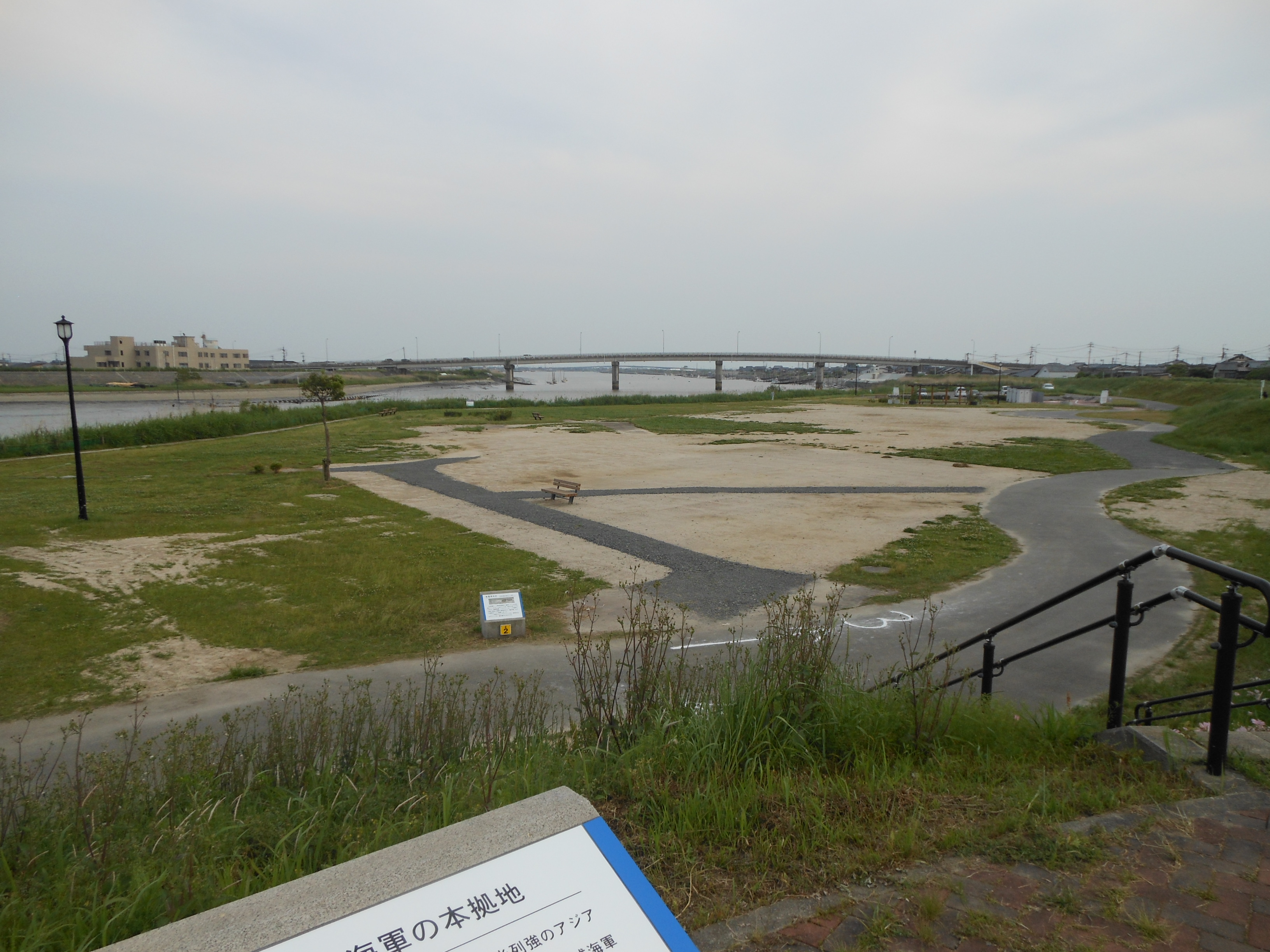
- Mietsu Naval Dock

- Mietsu Naval Dock Mietsu Naval Dock (Japan)
- Interactive map of Mietsu Naval Dock
- 33°12′26″N 130°20′23″E
- Periods: Bakumatsu period
- Location: Saga, Saga, Japan
- Region: Kyushu

Site notes
- Public access: Yes (museum)

UNESCO World Heritage Site
- Type: Cultural
- Criteria: Cultural: (ii), (iv)
- Designated: 2015
- Reference no.: 1484

The Mietsu Naval Dock (三重津海軍所, Mietsu Kaigunsho) was a Bakumatsu period repair and shipbuilding facility, located in what is now the Hayatsue, Kawasoe-machi, neighborhood of the city of Saga, Saga Prefecture Japan. Established by Saga Domain in 1858, it also served as an educational and training institute for the operation of Western ships. It site was designated a National Historic Site of Japan in 2013 In 2015, it was registered as a World Heritage Site as part of the "Meiji Industrial Revolution Heritage Sites of Japan".

== Overview ==
The Mietsu site is located at the mouth of the Hayatsue River, a tributary of the Chikugo River that flows along the border between Saga Prefecture and Fukuoka Prefecture, and was thus at the southeastern edge of Saga Domain's territory. The facility was established in 1858 at the recommendation of Sano Tsunetami, an advisor to the Nabeshima clan, and noted rangaku (western learning) scholar, by expanding an existing naval training center. In 1859, following the closure of the Nagasaki Naval Training Center by the Tokugawa shogunate, the facility was expanded in scope and function to continue the officer training of the many Saga Domain samurai who had been studying there, and to provide a repair facility for the domain's Western ships. The school provided courses and technical education in areas such as navigation, shipbuilding, and artillery, and also repaired and manufactured steamships. Ships in operation by the Saga Domain navy included the Dutch-made wooden sailing ship Hiunmaru, the wooden screw sloop Denryu-maru, and the wooden paddle steamer Kankō-maru as well as the wooden sailing ship Senpu-maru, which had built by Saga samurai at the Nagasaki Naval Training School. In 1865, the first practical steamship made in Japan, the Ryōfū-maru, was completed at the Mietsu Naval Dock.

Archaeological excavations carried out continuously from 2009 to 2014 have confirmed that the Mietsu facility was divided into three areas:, the Funaya area, the Practice area, and the Repairing area. The Funaya area was the original facility and included a small workshop and lumber yard. The "Practice Area" was a training facility for artillery. The "Covering Area" was made up of the "Manufacturing Area" where metal parts for Western-style ships were manufactured and the "Covering Area" where a dry dock was located. From "Manufacturing Area", the foundations of production facilities, such as a square furnace, a crucible furnace, and a casting shop as well as a large amount of iron rivets, metal slag, charcoal, furnace walls, tuyere, molds, crucibles, and forging flakes have been found, indicating that iron forging and the casting of ship parts was actively carried out here. Of these, the large iron rivets were likely used to press the iron plates of steam boilers. The large number of damaged products excavated, where the heads were removed with a chisel because the iron rivets could not be pressed to the iron plate, are indicative of the difficulties faced by Japanese technicians who had not yet mastered western technologies. Chemical analysis was conducted on both the iron rivets and bolts, and it was found that they were made of Western iron, and therefore were imported parts.

A stepped dry dock wall was discovered with a wooden framework made of logs, wooden stakes, and planks in a complex combination vertically, horizontally, and vertically. The dry dock was about 3.5 meters deep, about 24.5 meters wide, and over 60 meters long with a ramp for loading and unloading equipment to the bottom of the dock.

The end of the Mietsu Naval Dock is unclear. There are records indicating that it became a boarding point for soldiers of the Saga Domain who were dispatched to the Boshin War in 1867. There is also a record that in 1871, the remains of Nabeshima Naomasa, 10th and final daimyō of Saga Domain who had died in Tokyo that year, arrived at "Mietsu" and were transferred to Saga Castle. After the naval yard was closed, the Saga Maritime Training School was established in 1902, and was renamed as the Prefectural Merchant Marine Technical School from 1906 to 1932. The Sano Tsunetami Memorial Museum now stands on the site. The museum is 9.7 kilometers southeast of Saga Station on the Kyushu Shinkansen.

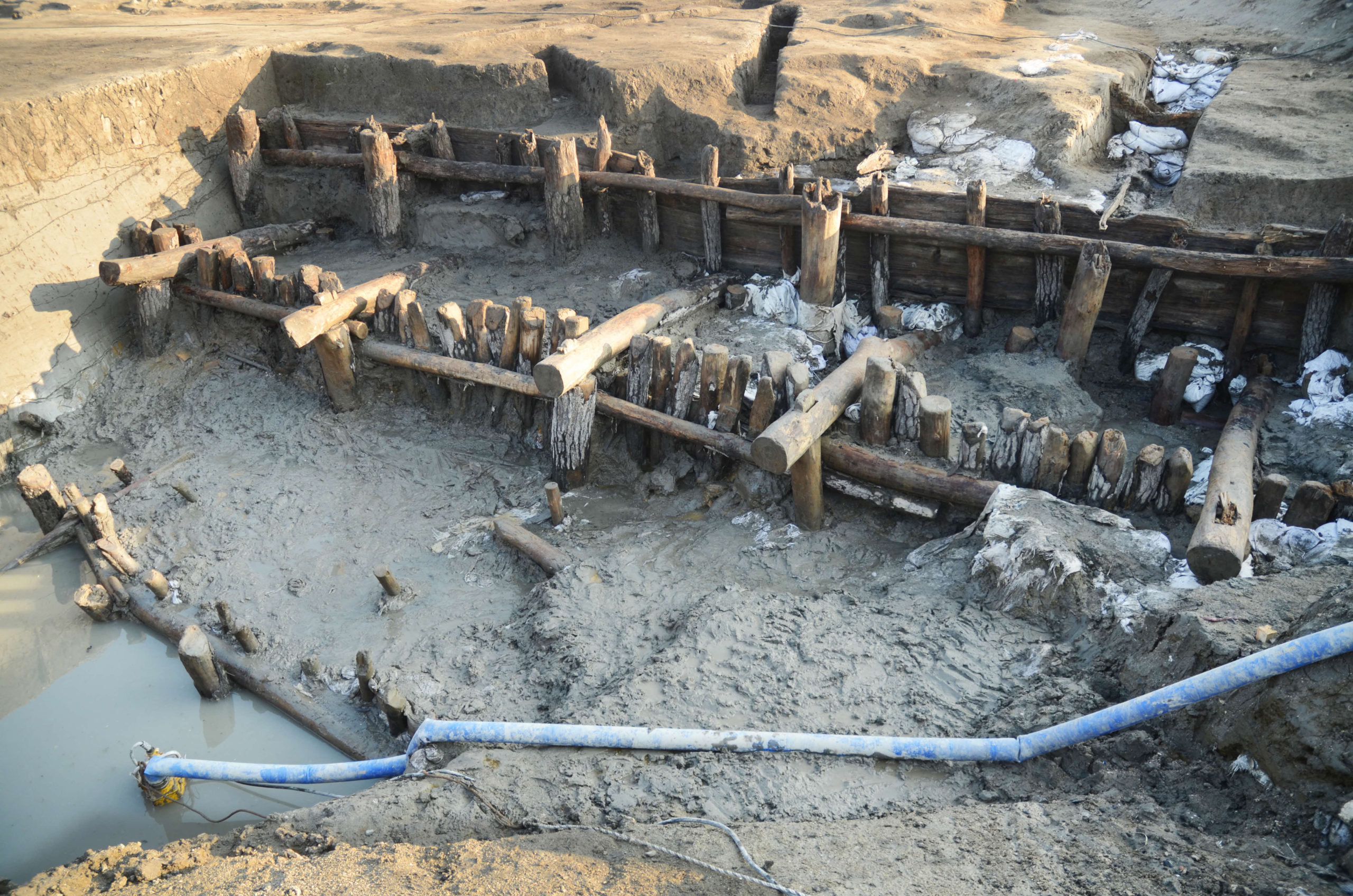
remains of dry dock

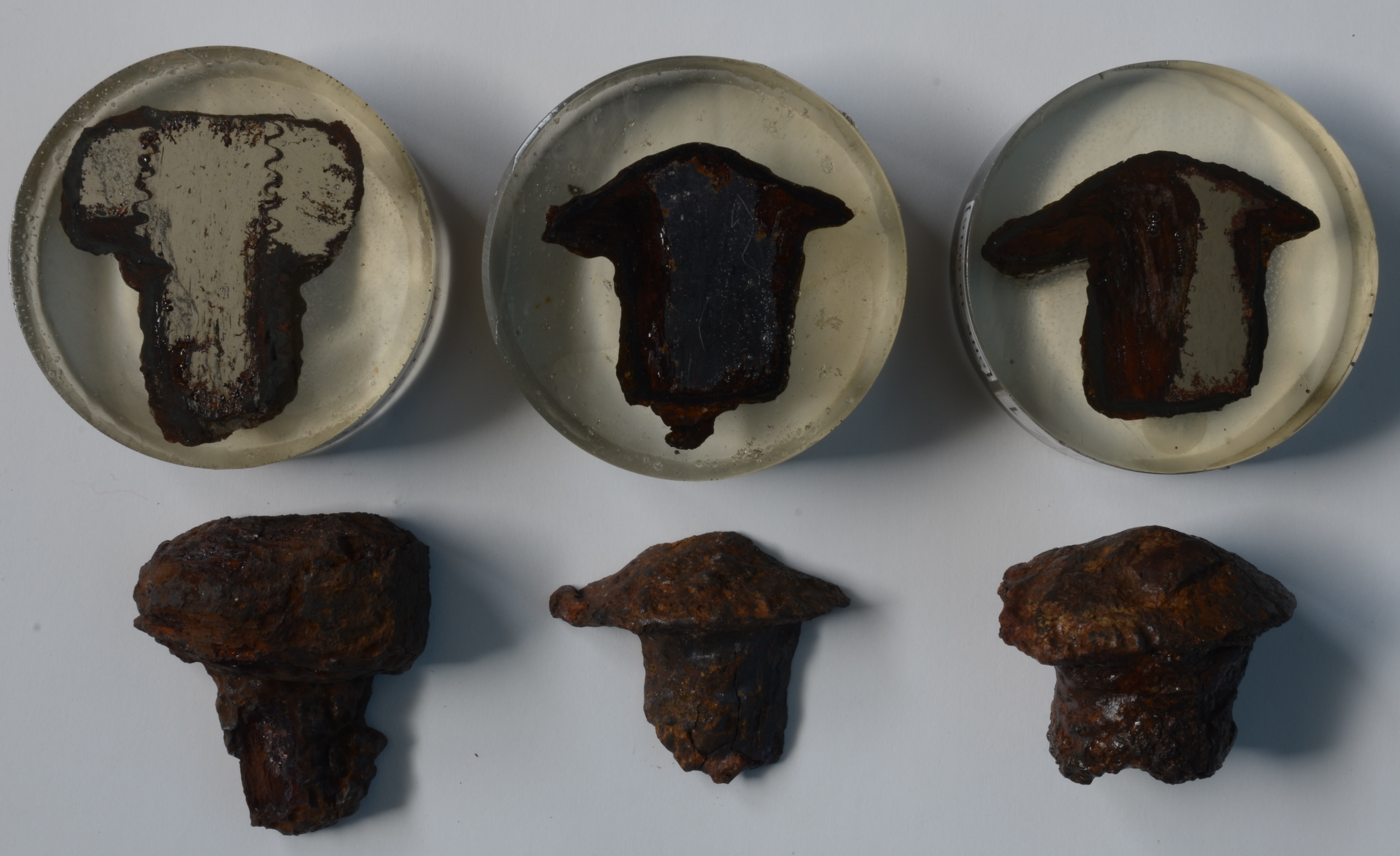
Rivets found at site

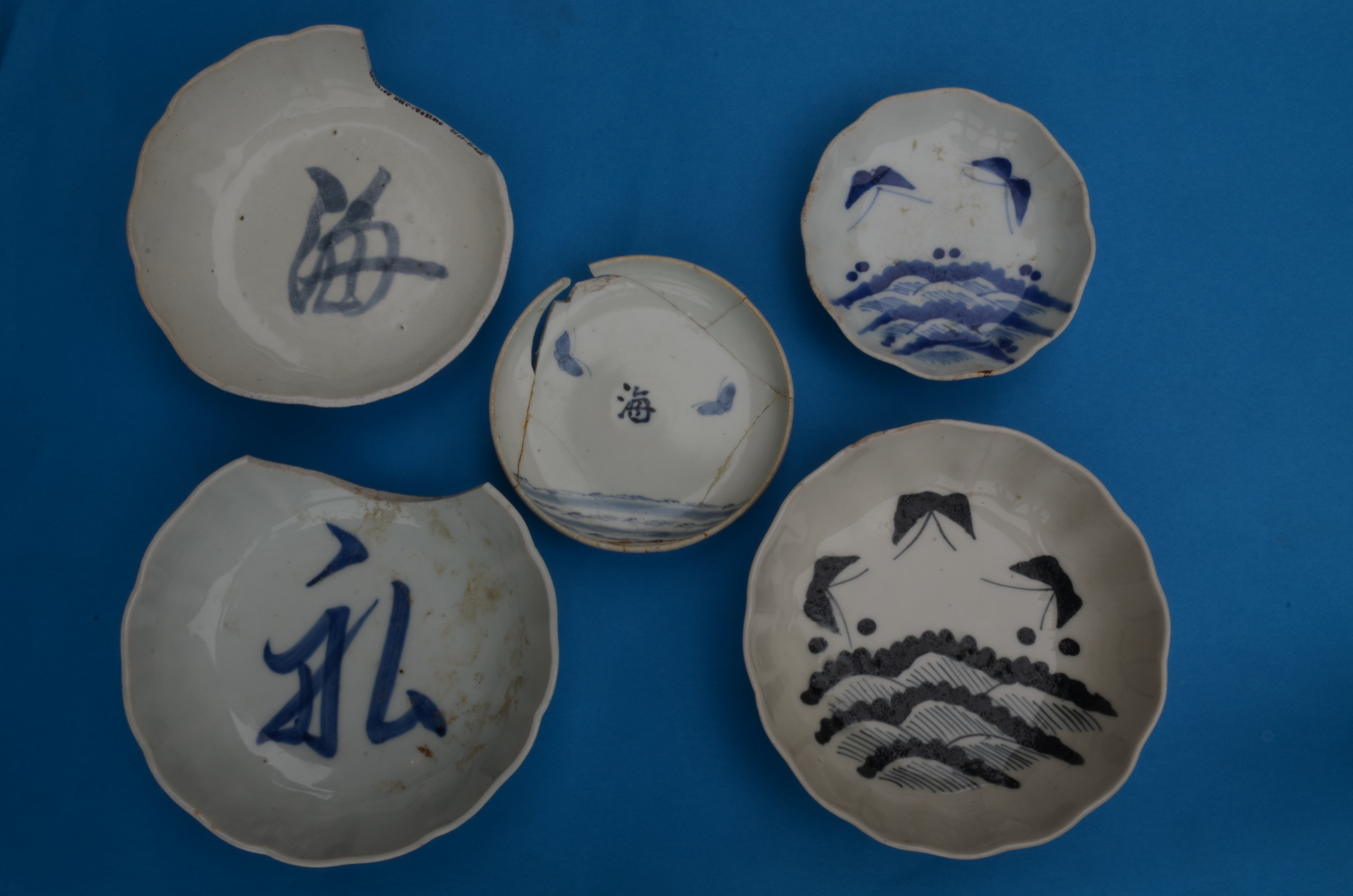
Ceramics with naval markings

== See also ==
- List of Historic Sites of Japan (Saga)
