= Nishikyushu University Junior College =

Private junior college in Saga, Japan

Coordinates: 33°16′17.8″N 130°17′1.9″E

- 西九州大学短期大学部
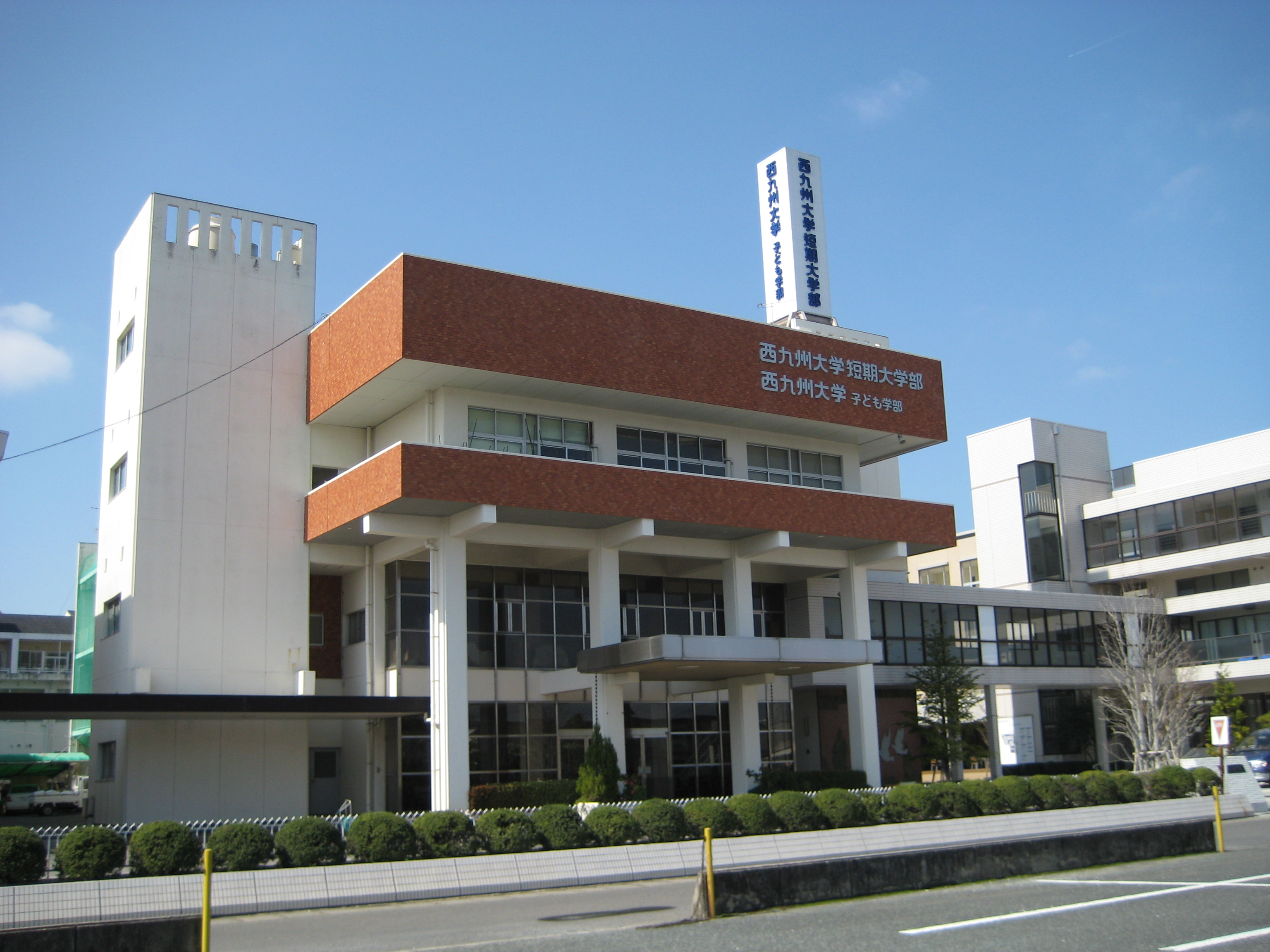
- 270px
- Established: 1963
- Academic staff: Food and Nutrition Studies
- Location: Saga, Saga, Japan

Nishikyushu University Junior College (西九州大学短期大学部, Nishikyūshū daigaku tanki daigakubu) is a private junior college in Saga, Saga, Japan.

== History ==
The school was founded in 1946 as Saga Academy of Nutrition (佐賀栄養専門学院, Saga eiyō senmon gakuin). It was chartered as a college in 1963 and renamed Saga Junior College (佐賀短期大学, Saga tanki daigaku) with the Department of Food and Nutrition Studies. In 1968 the college foundation, Nagahara Educational Corporation, established Saga Kasei University (renamed Nishikyushu University in 1974). In April 2009 the junior college was renamed Nishikyushu University Junior College.
