= Saga (city) =

Saga 佐賀市
- Prefecture capital and Special city
- Saga City
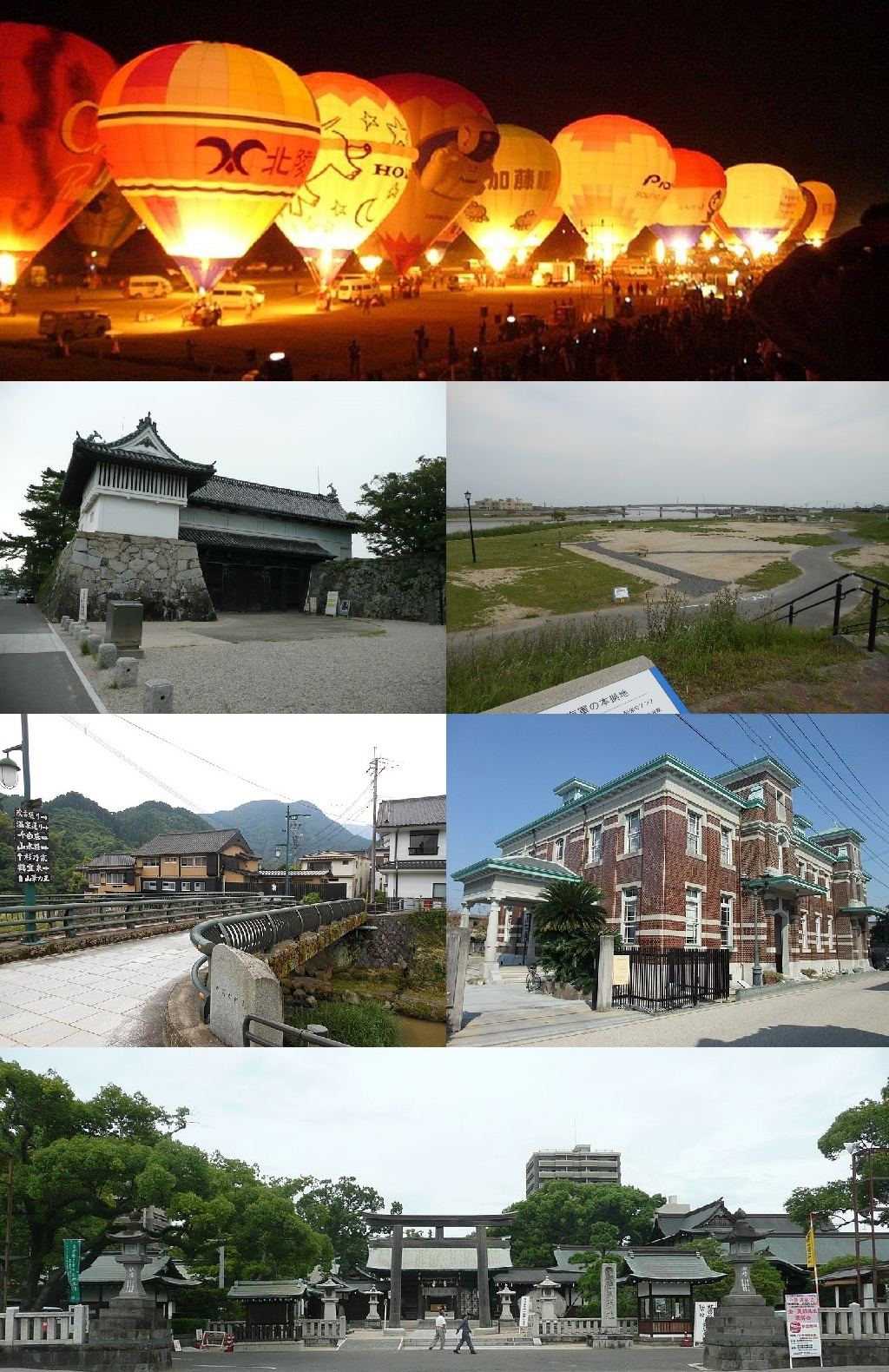
- Top:Saga International Balloon Fiesta. Second:Saga Castle, A heritage site of Mietsu Naval Dock, Third:Furuyu Spa, Saga Historial Folk Museum, Bottom:Saga Shrine, (all item from left to right)

- Flag

- Location of Saga in Saga Prefecture

- Location within Japan
- Coordinates: 33°15′49″N 130°18′03″E
- Country: Japan
- Region: Kyushu
- Prefecture: Saga

Government
  - Mayor: Toshiyuki Hideshima

Area
  - Total: 431.81 km^{2} (166.72 sq mi)

Population (April 30, 2024)
  - Total: 227,138
  - Density: 526.01/km^{2} (1,362.4/sq mi)
- Time zone: UTC+9 (Japan Standard Time)
- Tree: Ginkgo
- Flower: Cherry blossom (sakura)
- Address: 1-1 Sakaemachi, Saga-shi, Saga-ken 840-8501
- Website: Official website

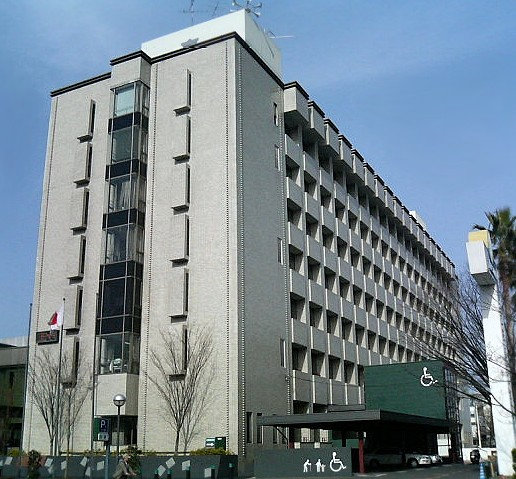
Saga City Hall

Saga (佐賀市, Saga-shi; Japanese pronunciation: [sä́.ɡä̀, -ŋä̀, sä̀.ɡä́.ɕì, -ŋä́-]) is the capital city of Saga Prefecture, located on the island of Kyushu, Japan. As of 30 April 2024, the city had an estimated population of 227,138 in 104,354 households, and a population density of 530 persons per km^{2}. The total area of the city is 431.81 km^{2} (166.72 sq mi).

== Geography ==
Saga City is located in the southeast portion of Saga Prefecture. After the 2005 merger, the city became very long north to south. It now borders the Ariake Sea to the south and Fukuoka Prefecture to the southeast and north. The northern half of the city is mountainous and undulating, and is part of the Sefuri Mountains, which are part of the Chikushi Mountains that run east to west through northern Kyushu. The southern half of the city is the Saga Plain, which is part of the western part of the Chikushi Plain that stretches along the north shore of the Ariake Sea, and is a low-lying area with almost no undulations. The urban area is located near the center of the Saga Plain. Mergers with surrounding towns and villages in 2005 and 2007 expanded the city area more than fourfold from 104 km^{2} (40 sq mi) to 431 km^{2} (166 sq mi), making it the second largest municipality in the prefecture after Karatsu City. Saga can also be regarded as within the Greater Fukuoka metropolitan area, and by extension, Fukuoka-Kitakyushu Metropolitan Area.

=== Adjoining municipalities ===
Fukuoka Prefecture

- Itoshima
- Ōkawa
- Sawara-ku, Fukuoka
- Yanagawa

Saga Prefecture

- Kanzaki
- Karatsu
- Ogi
- Taku

=== Climate ===
Saga has a humid subtropical climate (Köppen climate classification Cfa). The annual average precipitation ranges from about 1800 mm (71 in) in the city center to about 2400 mm (94 in) in Mitsuse. The annual average temperature ranges from about 13 °C (55 °F) in Mitsuse to 17 °C (63 °F) in the city center.

Climate data for Saga (1991−2020 normals, extremes 1890−present)
Month	Jan	Feb	Mar	Apr	May	Jun	Jul	Aug	Sep	Oct	Nov	Dec	Year
Record high °C (°F)	21.1 (70.0)	23.1 (73.6)	25.9 (78.6)	30.8 (87.4)	35.8 (96.4)	37.1 (98.8)	39.6 (103.3)	40.2 (104.4)	37.9 (100.2)	33.6 (92.5)	29.6 (85.3)	24.6 (76.3)	40.2 (104.4)
Mean maximum °C (°F)	15.5 (59.9)	18.7 (65.7)	22.1 (71.8)	27.0 (80.6)	31.4 (88.5)	33.0 (91.4)	36.1 (97.0)	36.8 (98.2)	34.2 (93.6)	29.6 (85.3)	24.0 (75.2)	18.3 (64.9)	37.1 (98.8)
Mean daily maximum °C (°F)	10.1 (50.2)	11.8 (53.2)	15.2 (59.4)	20.7 (69.3)	25.6 (78.1)	28.0 (82.4)	31.6 (88.9)	32.9 (91.2)	29.4 (84.9)	24.3 (75.7)	18.2 (64.8)	12.4 (54.3)	21.7 (71.1)
Daily mean °C (°F)	5.8 (42.4)	7.0 (44.6)	10.4 (50.7)	15.3 (59.5)	20.0 (68.0)	23.5 (74.3)	27.2 (81.0)	28.2 (82.8)	24.5 (76.1)	19.1 (66.4)	13.3 (55.9)	7.8 (46.0)	16.9 (62.4)
Mean daily minimum °C (°F)	1.8 (35.2)	2.6 (36.7)	5.7 (42.3)	10.2 (50.4)	15.2 (59.4)	19.9 (67.8)	24.0 (75.2)	24.6 (76.3)	20.7 (69.3)	14.7 (58.5)	8.9 (48.0)	3.6 (38.5)	12.7 (54.9)
Mean minimum °C (°F)	−2.8 (27.0)	−2.2 (28.0)	−0.2 (31.6)	3.7 (38.7)	9.8 (49.6)	15.2 (59.4)	20.5 (68.9)	21.1 (70.0)	15.6 (60.1)	8.6 (47.5)	2.7 (36.9)	−1.4 (29.5)	−3.4 (25.9)
Record low °C (°F)	−6.9 (19.6)	−6.2 (20.8)	−4.1 (24.6)	−1.1 (30.0)	3.7 (38.7)	8.2 (46.8)	14.3 (57.7)	16.2 (61.2)	9.4 (48.9)	1.8 (35.2)	−1.3 (29.7)	−6.5 (20.3)	−6.9 (19.6)
Average precipitation mm (inches)	54.1 (2.13)	77.5 (3.05)	120.6 (4.75)	161.7 (6.37)	182.9 (7.20)	327.0 (12.87)	366.8 (14.44)	252.4 (9.94)	169.3 (6.67)	90.1 (3.55)	89.4 (3.52)	59.5 (2.34)	1,951.3 (76.82)
Average snowfall cm (inches)	2 (0.8)	1 (0.4)	0 (0)	0 (0)	0 (0)	0 (0)	0 (0)	0 (0)	0 (0)	0 (0)	0 (0)	1 (0.4)	4 (1.6)
Average precipitation days (≥ 0.5 mm)	9.0	9.2	11.1	10.3	9.5	13.8	13.0	11.4	10.2	6.6	8.4	8.1	120.7
Average relative humidity (%)	69	67	65	65	66	74	76	73	72	68	70	70	70
Mean monthly sunshine hours	128.2	139.5	169.0	186.7	197.1	131.4	164.8	200.4	174.1	188.0	153.2	137.9	1,970.5
Source: Japan Meteorological Agency

=== Demographics ===
Per Japanese census data, the population of Saga is as shown below.

Historical population
Year	Pop.	±%
1940	198,243	—
1950	206,639	+4.2%
1960	215,000	+4.0%
1970	236,029	+9.8%
1980	243,726	+3.3%
1990	243,076	−0.3%
2000	237,501	−2.3%
2010	237,506	+0.0%
2020	233,301	−1.8%

== History ==
The area of Saga was settled in the Jōmon and Yayoi periods and was part of ancient Hizen Province. The ruins of the Hizen Provincial Capital have been located in the former Yamato neighborhood of the city. In the Sengoku period, the area was controlled by the Ryūzōji clan, but in 1608 the clan was replaced by their senior retainer, Nabeshima Naoshige, who became daimyō of Saga Domain under the Tokugawa shogunate. Saga, formerly a small town centered on water transportation and agriculture, developed into the castle town of the domain after the construction of Saga Castle, and commerce and industry flourished. The domain due to its proximity to Nagasaki, it actively introduced Western science and technology, and in the Bakumatsu period was one of the main centers involved in the Meiji restoration.

=== Municipal timeline ===
- April 1, 1889 - The modern municipal system was established and the city of Saga is founded. At the same time, the current city region is occupied by 21 villages from three districts.
  - Kanzaki District: Hasuike and Mitsuse.
  - Ogi District: Kitayama and Nanzan.
  - Saga District: Higashikawasoe, Honjō, Hyōgo, Kamino, Kase, Kasuga, Kawakami, Kinryū, Kitakawasoe, Kose, Kuboizumi, Matsuume, Nabeshima, Nikita, Nishiyoka, Oseki and Takakise.
- June 6, 1899 - Kose changed the kanji of its name.
- October 1, 1922 - Kamino was incorporated into Saga.
- November 3, 1935 - Hasuike was elevated to town status.
- March 31, 1954 - Hyōgo, Kase, Kose, Nishiyoka and Takakise were all incorporated into Saga.
- October 1, 1954 - Honjō, Kinryū, Kitakawasoe, Kuboizumi and Nabeshima were all incorporated into Saga.
- March 1, 1955 - Higashikawasoe and Nikita were merged to create the town of Morodomi.
- October 1, 2005 - The towns of Fuji, Morodomi and Yamato (all from Saga District) and the village of Mitsuse (from Kanzaki District) merged with Saga. (population: 206,967; area: 355.15 km^{2})
- October 1, 2007 - The towns of Higashiyoka, Kawasoe, and Kubota (all from Saga District) were all incorporated into Saga. (population: roughly 240,000; area: 431.42 km^{2}) Saga District was dissolved as a result of this merger.

== Government ==
Saga has a mayor-council form of government with a directly elected mayor and a unicameral city council of 36 members. Saga contributes 11 members to the Saga Prefectural Assembly. In terms of national politics, the city is part of the Saga 1st district of the lower house of the Diet of Japan.

== Economy/Industry ==
In the areas surrounding the city, the agricultural industry focuses on planting grains that make use of water. The fishery centers on seaweed cultivation using the Ariake Sea.

Originally one of the largest rice-producing areas, a large farmland has been converted it into a vegetable field in response to changes in the environment surrounding agriculture. In terms of industry, the terrain is facing the Ariake Sea, but since it is a shallow area where large vessels cannot navigate, heavy industry has not developed much. In addition, in the first half of the 20th century, coal and prefecture western flourished because there was not much competition.

On the other hand, the food industry and the textile industry have developed throughout the late 20th century. Although the food industry is still strong, the textile industry has been the main industry since the 1970s. However, since the 1990s the automobile parts industry has been growing due to the accumulation of automobiles and parts industry in northern Kyushu.

Although it is located at the prefecture capital and the service industry accounts for a large number of employees, the shipping industry in commerce is not particularly large compared to other cities of the same size. Currently, three large suburban commercial facilities with a sales floor area of 50,000 m^{2} are in competition with each other, and there is an unbalanced demand for supply.

The number of companies with head offices and main offices in the city is the largest in the prefecture, but it is not that much compared to the neighboring prefectures. There is also the tendency of branch offices to be in urban cities, which is often prefecture capitals.

In terms of percent by industry, the tertiary industry exceeds 70%, but it is the lowest among the seven prefectures of Kyushu. The proportion of secondary industries is small, while the proportion of primary industry is relatively high. (Census data: October 1, 2005)

== Education ==
=== Colleges and universities ===
- Nishikyushu University Junior College
- Saga University
- Saga Women's Junior College

=== Primary and secondary education ===
Saga has 35 public elementary schools operated by the city government and one by the national government. The city has 18 public junior high schools operated by the city government and one by the national government, and two private junior high schools. There are also two private combined junior/senior high schools and one combined junior/high school operated by the Saga Prefectural Board of Education. The prefecture operates six public high schools and there are five private high schools in addition to the above-mentioned combined junior/senior high schools.

== Transportation ==
=== Airports ===
- Saga Airport, located in the former town of Kawasoe. Before the opening of Saga Airport, both Fukuoka Airport and Nagasaki Airport was the nearest airport. However, many people in Saga still use these airports due its greater number of routes and flights offered. There is an express bus which connects the two airports.

=== Railway ===
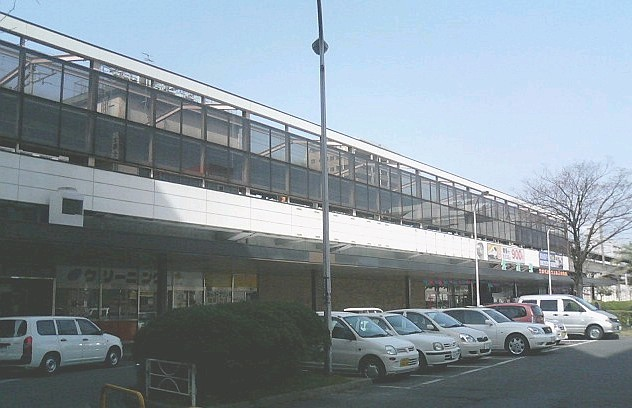
The south exit of Saga Station

JR Kyushu - Nagasaki Main Line

JH Igaya - Saga - Nabeshima - Balloon Saga (only in operation during the Saga International Balloon Fiesta) - Igaya - Kubota

JR Kyushu - Karatsu Line

JK Kubota

=== Highways ===
  - Nagasaki Expressway (Saga Yamato Interchange, Kinryū Service Area )
- National Route 34("Hokubu Bypass")
- National Route 207
- National Route 208 ("Nambu Bypass")
- National Route 263 (Mitsuse Tunnel); (Yamato Roadside Station)
- National Route 264
- National Route 323
- National Route 444

== Sister cities ==
Saga is twinned with:

- Cussac-Fort-Médoc, France
- Glens Falls, New York, United States, since 1988
- Lianyungang, China
- Warren County, New York United States, since 1988
- Yeonje District, South Korea

== Local attractions ==
- Kakurintei Tea House located in the grounds of Kono Koen is a very quaint and picturesque Japanese tea house overlooking a pond.
- Saga Castle - Standing out from many cultural assets is the plains castle within the city, Saga Castle. It is one of the rare castles in Japan surrounded by a wall rather than built on one. First built between 1591 and 1593, there was a fire in 1726. Renovated in 1728, there was yet another fire in 1835. Nabeshima Naomasa, daimyō of the Nabeshima clan, renovated it within two years and moved in. In 1874 it was a court building and a prefectural office. 1883 saw it become a junior school. The buildings were eventually replaced by modern school buildings.

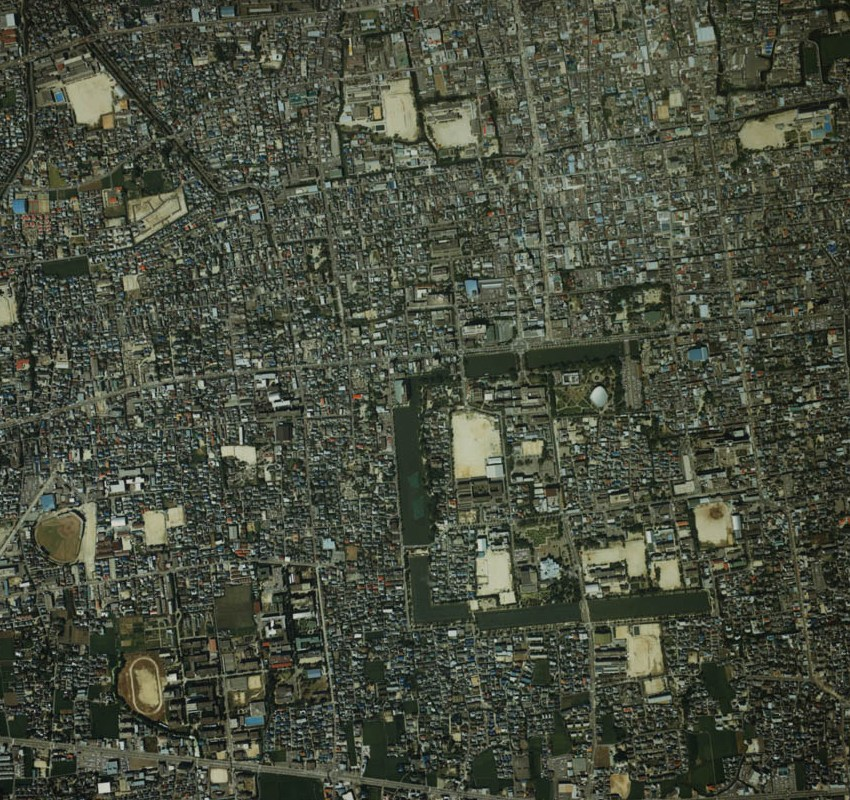
Around Saga Castle

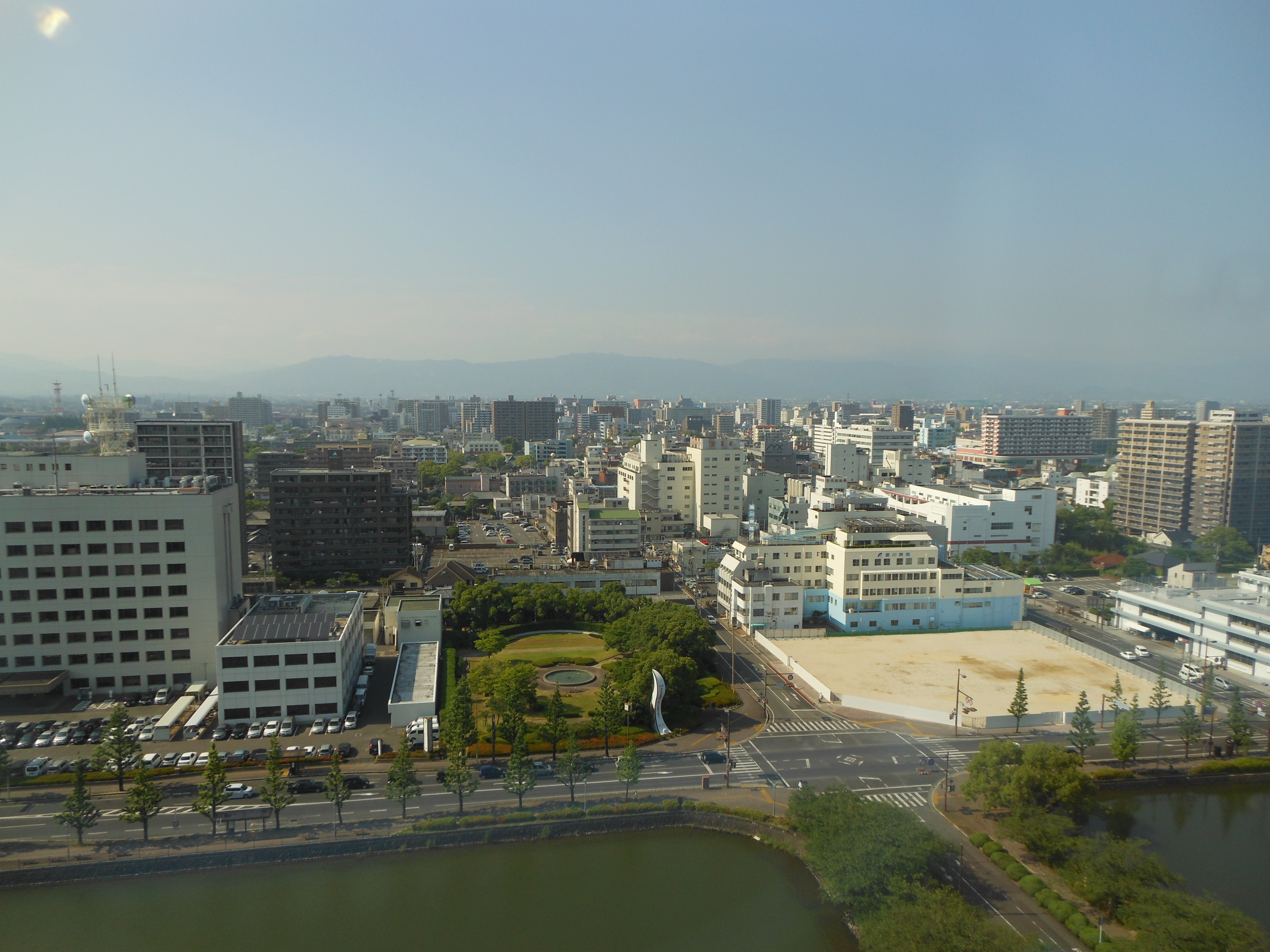
Northward view of downtown Saga

- "Saga International Balloon Fiesta" held every autumn in the dry riverbed of the Kase River. A quarter of the visitors are from Saga. The number of visitors was about 15 million in 2005. Hot air balloonists from many countries enter this event.

=== National Historic Sites ===
- Chōshizuka Kofun (Saga)
- Higashimyō Site
- Hizen Provincial Capital ruins
- Mietsu Naval Dock Site, also a World Heritage Site
- Nishikuma Kofun
- Obukumayama Kōgoishi
- Ōkuma Shigenobu Former Residence

== Notable people from Saga ==
- Egashira 2:50, a comedian
- Hanawa, singer and comedian. He released a CD about Saga city
- Yasuko Matsuyuki, singer and actress known for her glamorous and sophisticated personality. She is mentioned in Hanawa's song as being one of the celebrities that won't admit being from Saga. She moved away from Saga at the age of 19 to be a model.
- Noriko Nakagoshi, an actress
- Saburō Sakai, Japanese naval aviator and flying ace
- Rikako Sakata, actress known for Miu Kazashiro in Kamen Rider Fourze
- Shigeo Shingo, an industrial engineer who distinguished himself as one of the world's leading experts on manufacturing practices.
- Ikumi Yoshimatsu, Miss International 2012
