= Shimabara-Funatsu Station =

Railway station in Shimabara, Nagasaki Prefecture, Japan

Shimabara-Funatsu Station (Note: Platform signage displays the romanised spelling of this station as Shimabarafunatsu, though Shimabara-Funatsu is also common usage.) 島原船津駅
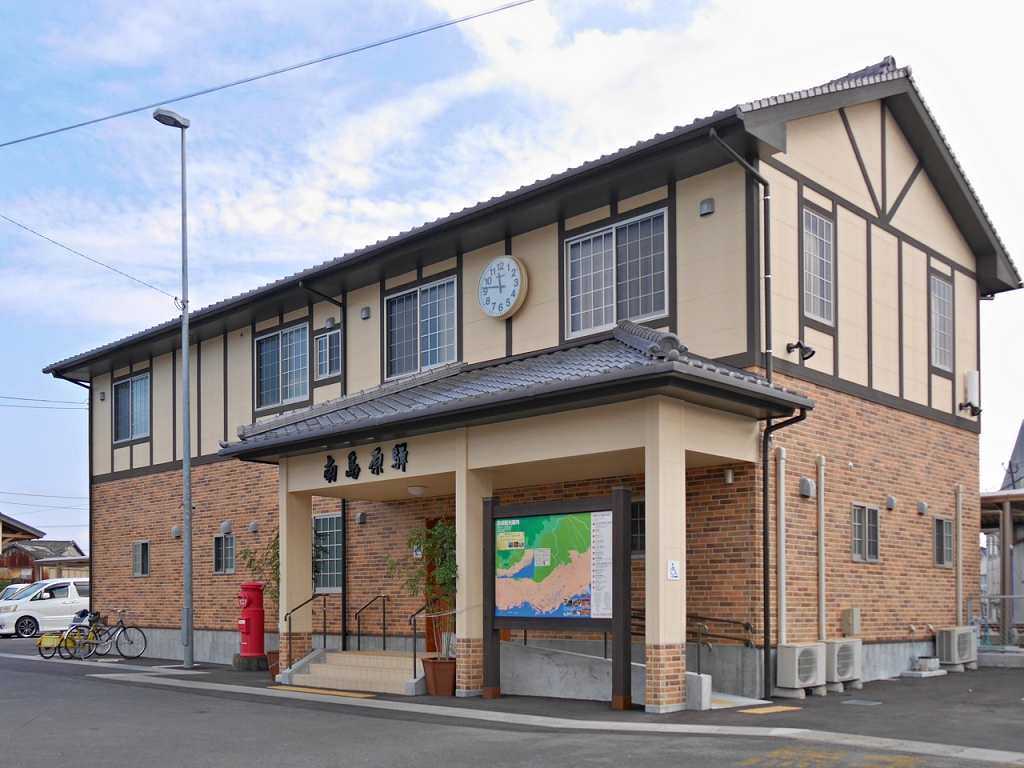
- Station building rebuilt in 2015

General information
- Location: 409-1 Tsumachi, Shimabara-shi, Nagasaki-ken 855-0814; Japan
- Coordinates: 32°46′32.0″N 130°22′32.1″E
- Operator: Shimabara Railway
- Line: ■ Shimabara Railway Line
- Distance: 42.3 km from Isahaya
- Platforms: 1 side + 1 island platforms

Construction
- Accessible: Wheelchair accessible with ramps

Other information
- Status: Staffed
- Website: Official website

History
- Opened: 24 September 1913; 112 years ago
- Former names: Minato-Shinchi (to 1918); Shimabara Minato (to 1960); Minami-Shimabara (to 2019)

Passengers
- FY2018: 25 daily

Services
| Preceding station | Shimabara Railway | Following station |
|---|---|---|
| Reikyūkōen-Taiikukan towards Isahaya | Shimabara Railway Line | Shimabarakō Terminus |
Location
- Location within Nagasaki Prefecture Location within Japan

Shimabara-Funatsu Station (島原船津駅, Shimabara-funatsu-eki) is a passenger railway station in located in the city of Shimabara, Nagasaki. It is operated by third-sector railway company Shimabara Railway.

== Lines ==
The station is served by the Shimabara Railway Line and is located 42.3 km from the starting point of the line at Isahaya.

== Station layout ==
The station is on the ground level with one side platform and one island platform with two tracks. There is a train depot, and since many trains turn around at this station, there are several sidings and trains are kept overnight. The platform closest to the sidings is rarely used and is often used for storing trains. In addition, when there is no train exchange, both up and down trains stop at the platform on the station building side. There is a retractable refueling facility between the up and down main tracks in front of the main building. Before the section to Katsusa Station was abolished, diesel railcars on this line were often refueled while stopped at this station. The original station building was a two-story wooden structure built in 1913. It was used for over 100 years after the station was first opened, but due to the surrounding road construction and deterioration, it was decided to rebuild it. The new station building retains the old station building's design in details, such as the station name written in old calligraphy on the front, a round clock, and high windows that stretch horizontally, and the main entrance has been made barrier-free.

=== Platforms ===
| 1 | ■ ■ Shimabara Railway Line | for Shimabara and Isahaya |
| 2 | ■ ■Shimabara Railway Line | for Shimabarakō |
| 3 | ■ ■Shimabara Railway Line | for Shimabara and Isahaya starting trains |

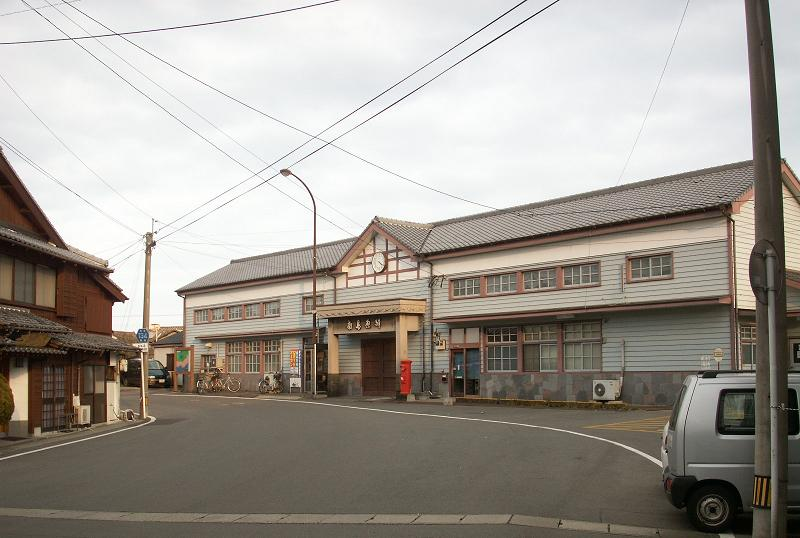
Former main station building in 2007

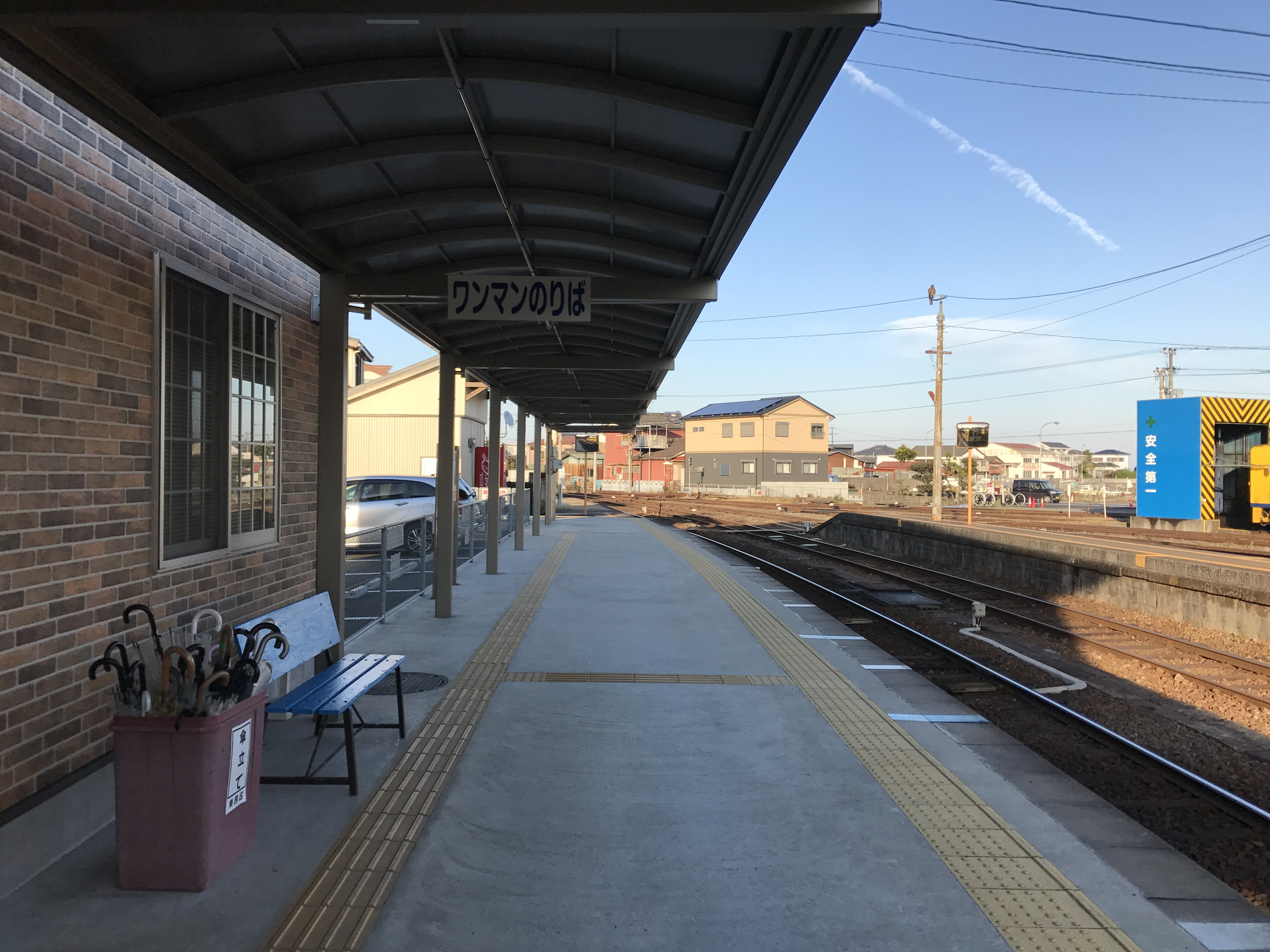
Station platform

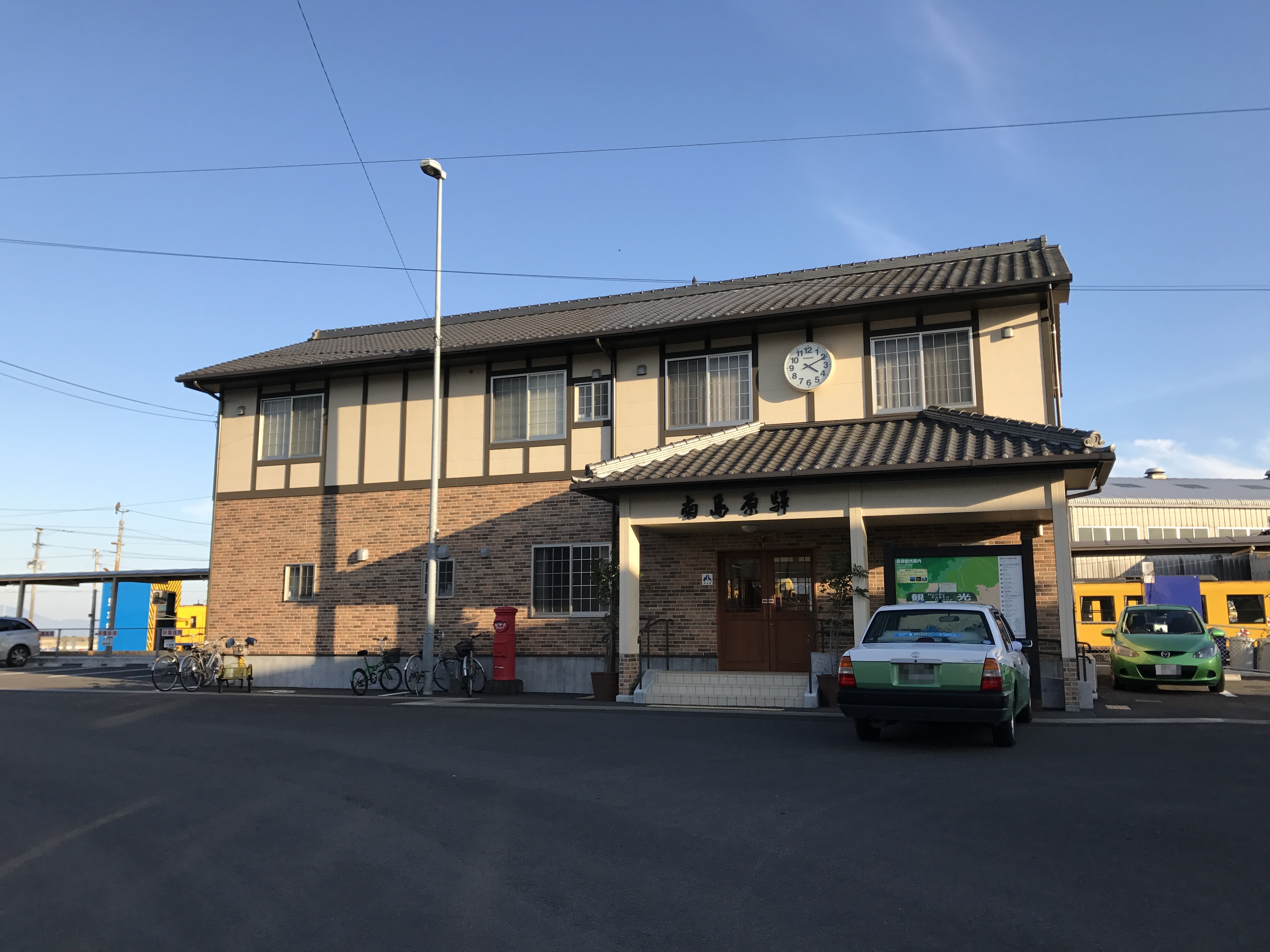
New station building with Shimbara Railway carriage (far right)

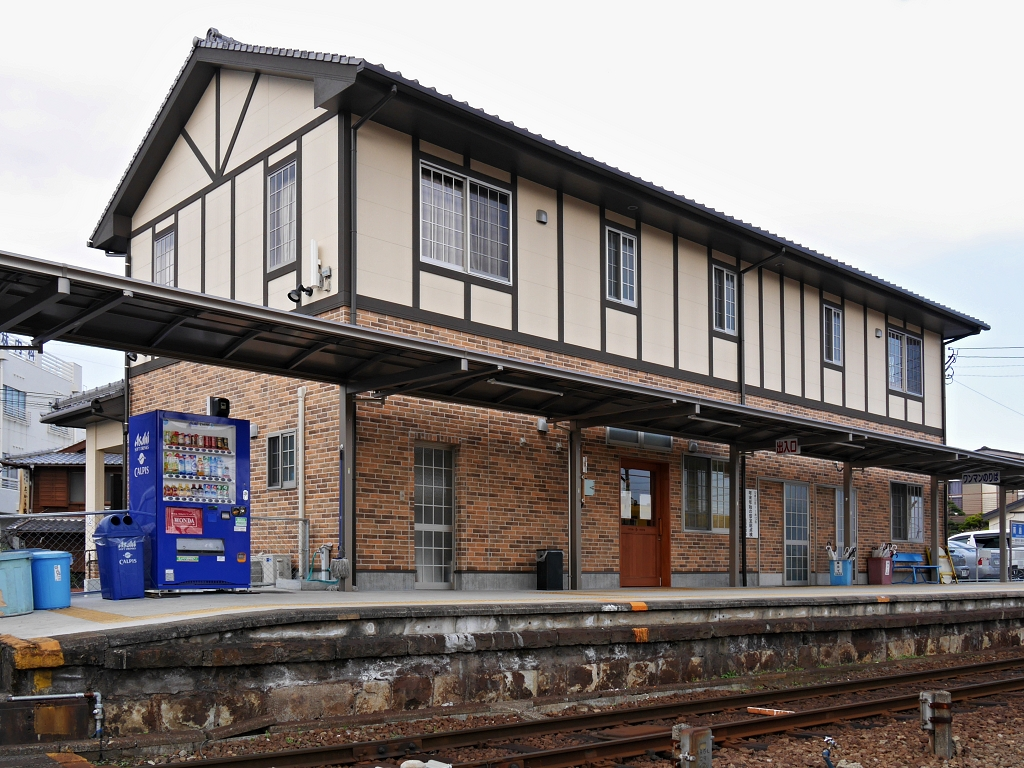
Station building from middle island platform

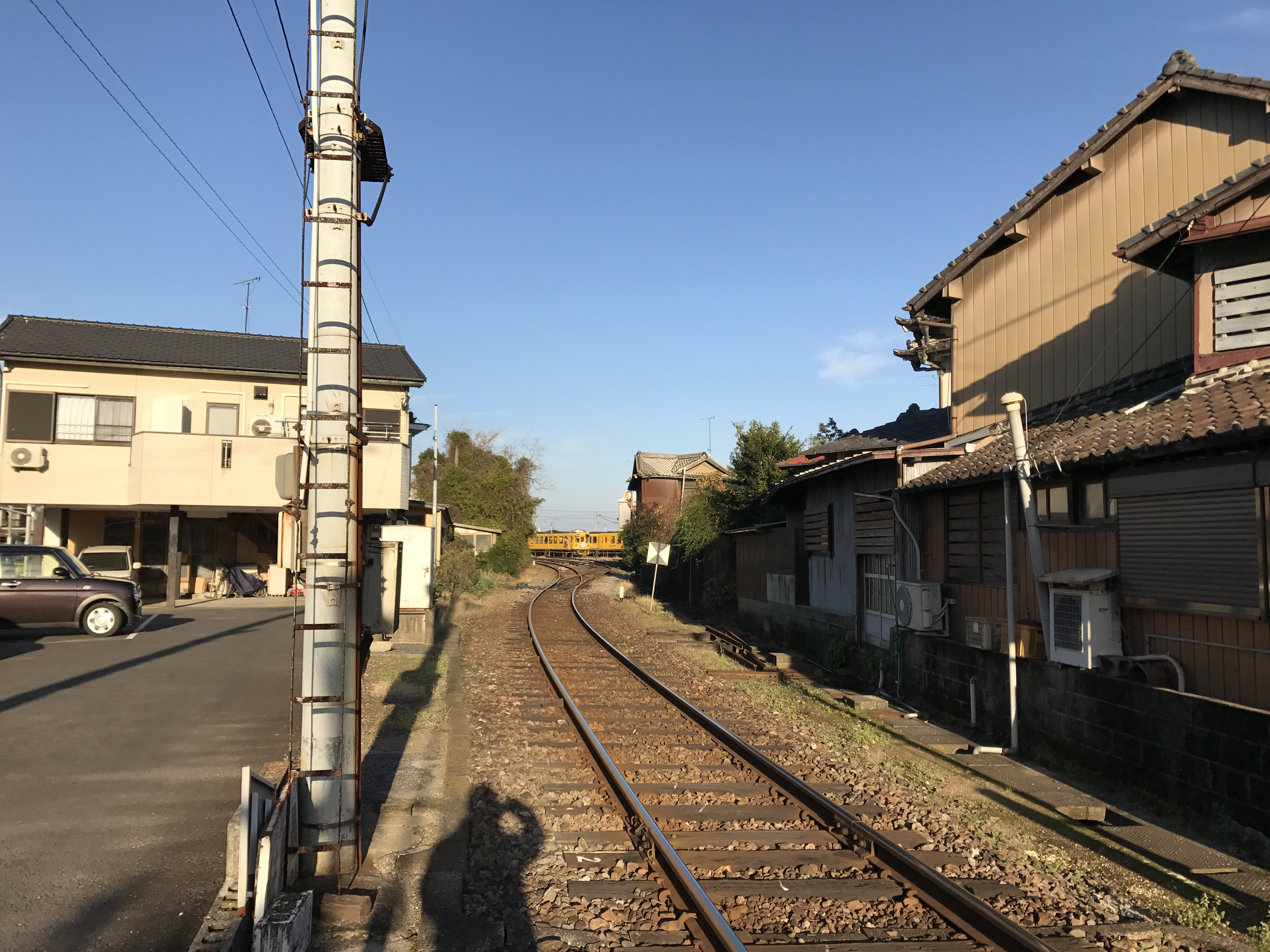
Shimabara Railway carriages and station from Shinchibashi

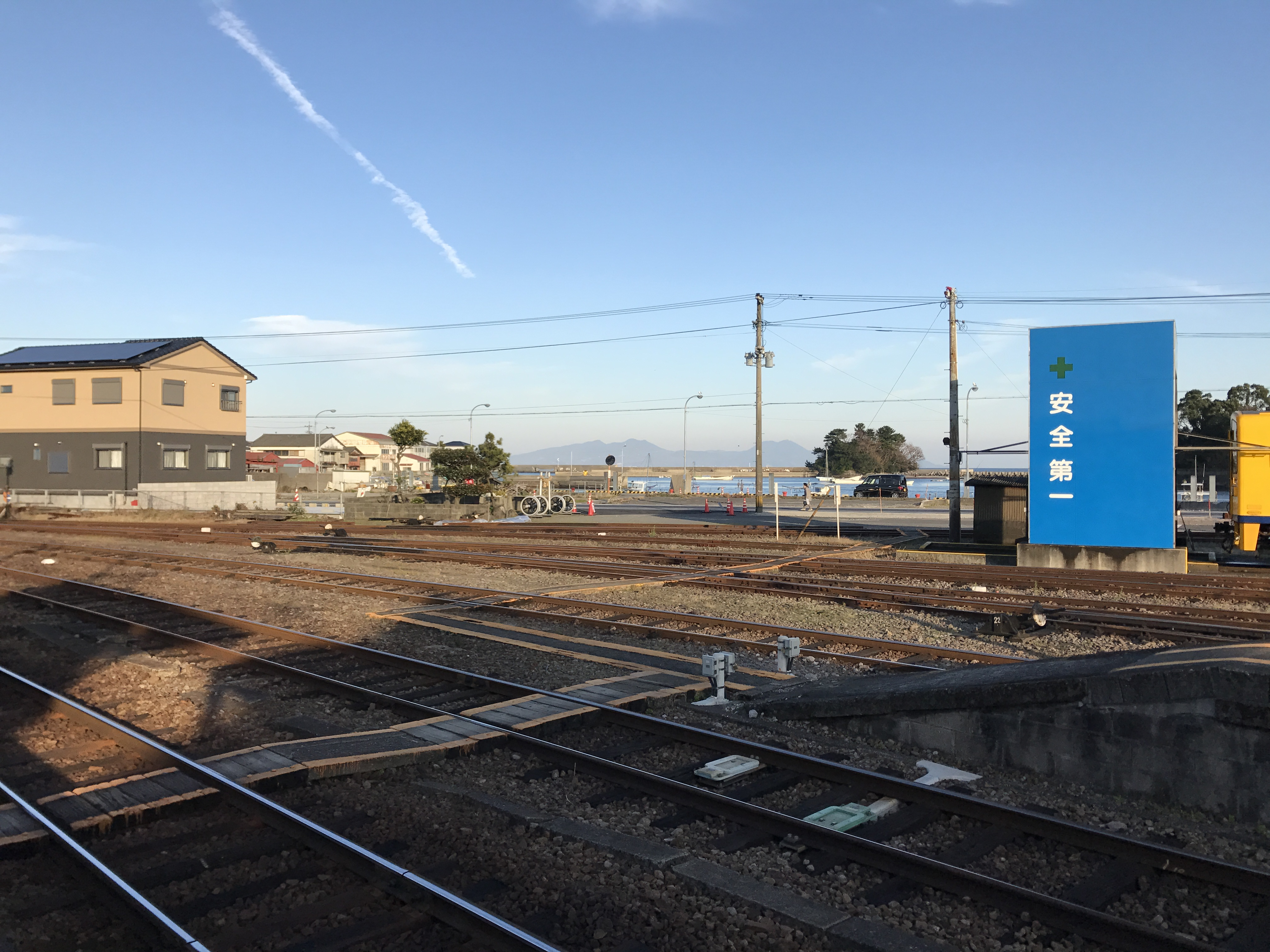
View of the bay from the station platform

== History ==
Shimabara-Funatsu Station was opened on 24 September 1913 as Minato-Shinchi Station (湊新地駅). The station was renamed Shimabara Minato Station (島原湊駅) on 16 July 1918 and renamed again to Minami-Shimabara Station (南島原駅) on 5 November 1960. It was renamed to its present name on 1 October 2019.

== Passenger statistics ==
In fiscal 2018, there were a total of 9,132 boarding passengers, given a daily average of 25 passengers.

== Surrounding area ==
- National Route 251
- Shimabara Port
- Shimabara City Third Elementary School

== See also ==
- List of railway stations in Japan
