= Ōmisaki Station =

Railway station in Shimabara, Nagasaki Prefecture, Japan

Ōmisaki Station 大三東駅
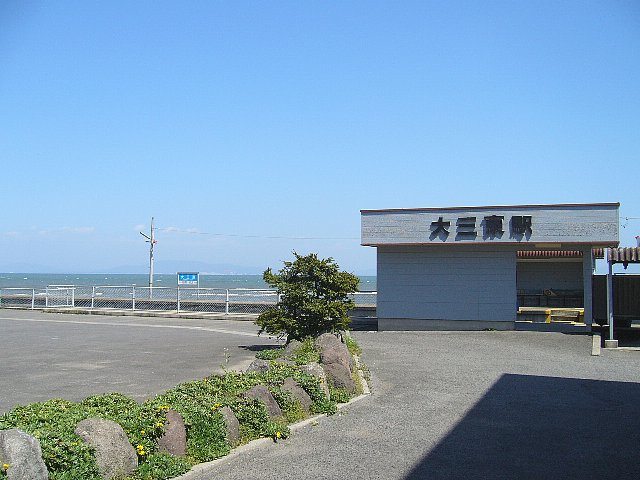
- Ōmisaki Station

General information
- Location: Ariake-chō, Shimabara-shi, Nagasaki-ken 859-1413; Japan
- Coordinates: 32°50′37.43″N 130°20′40.77″E
- Operator: Shimabara Railway
- Line: ■ Shimabara Railway Line
- Distance: 34.2 km from Isahaya
- Platforms: 2 side platforms

Other information
- Status: Unstaffed
- Website: Official website

History
- Opened: 10 May 1913

Passengers
- FY2018: 30 daily

Services
Preceding station	Shimabara Railway	Following station
Ariake-Yue towards Isahaya	Shimabara Railway Line	Matsuo towards Shimabarakō
Location
- Location within Nagasaki Prefecture Location within Japan

Ōmisaki Station (大三東駅, Ōmisaki-eki) is a passenger railway station in located in the Ariake neighborhood of the city of Shimabara, Nagasaki. It is operated by third-sector railway company Shimabara Railway. The station is believed to be the closest railway station to the seas around Japan.

== Lines ==
The station is served by the Shimabara Railway Line and is located 34.1 km from the starting point of the line at Isahaya.

== Station layout ==
The station is on the ground level with two opposing unnumbered side platforms and two tracks. Both platforms are connected by a level crossing. It is an unattended station. There is a covered seating area surrounded on three sides on the outbound platform..

=== Platforms ===
station side (west)	■ ■ Shimabara Railway Line	for Isahaya
opposite side (east)	■ ■Shimabara Railway Line	for Shimabara and Shimabarakō

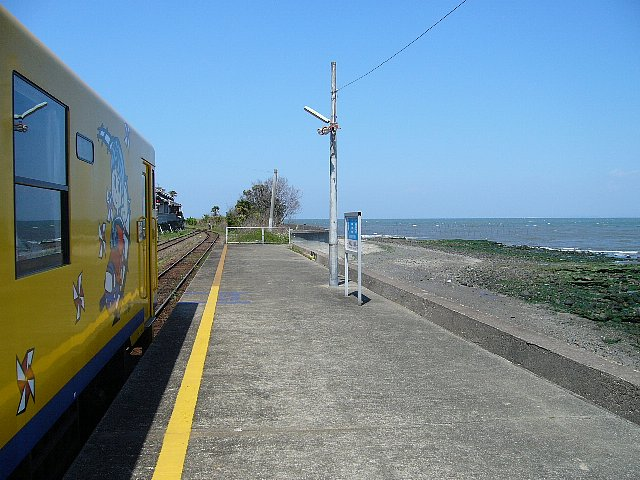
Platforms

== History ==
Ōmisaki Station was opened on 10 May 1913. The current station building was rebuilt in September 1983.

== Passenger statistics ==
In fiscal 2018, there were a total of 10,999 boarding passengers, given a daily average of 30 passengers.

== Surrounding area ==
- National Route 251
- Shimabara City Daisan Higashi Elementary School

== See also ==
- List of railway stations in Japan
