= Taira Station =

Railway station in Unzen, Nagasaki Prefecture, Japan

Taira Station 多比良駅
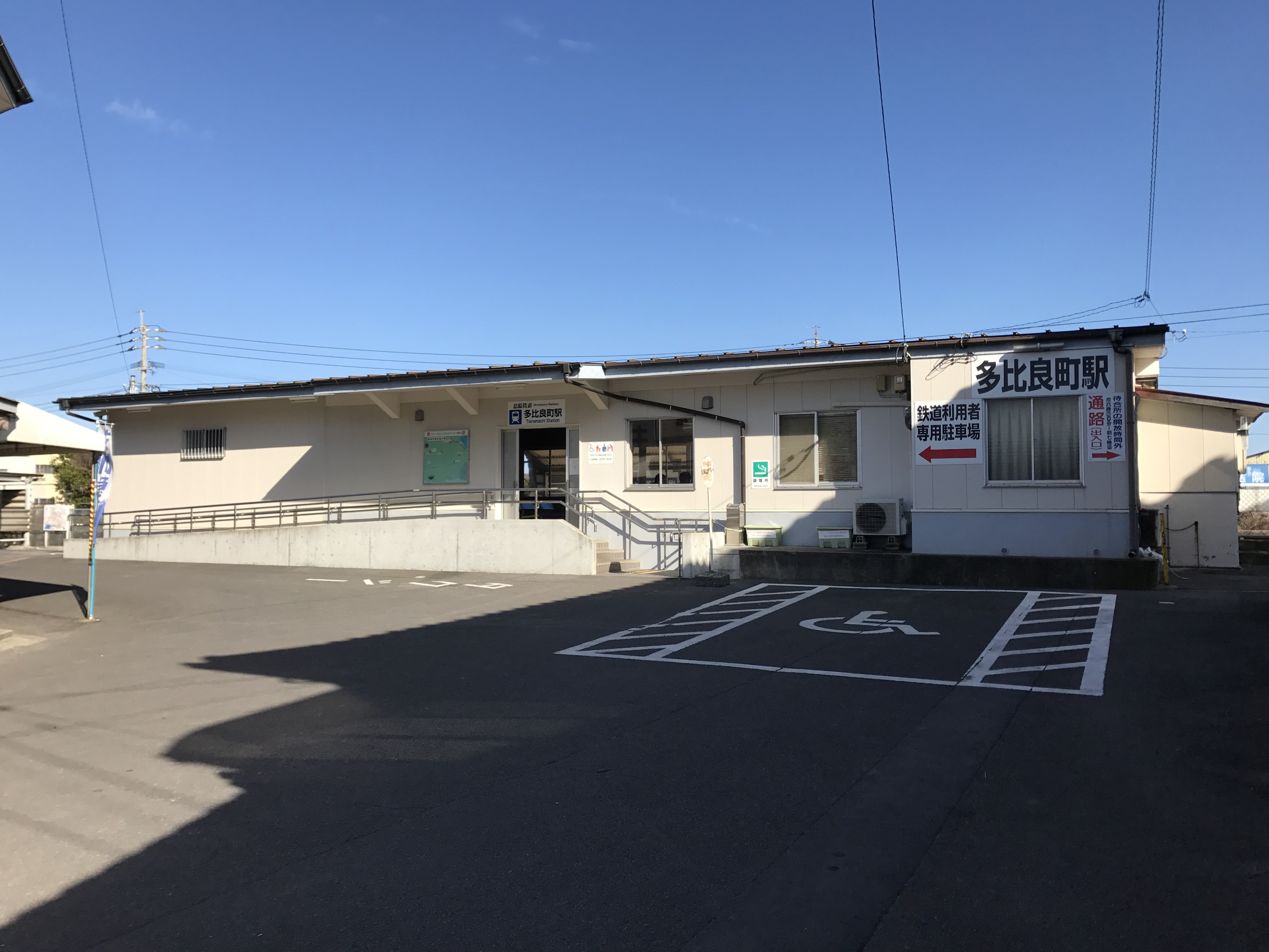

General information
- Location: Kunimi-chō, Unzen-shi, Nagasaki-ken859-1322; Japan
- Coordinates: 32°52′18.41″N 130°18′32.21″E
- Operator: Shimabara Railway
- Line: ■ Shimabara Railway Line
- Distance: 29.4 km from Isahaya
- Platforms: 2 side platforms

Other information
- Status: Staffed
- Website: Official website

History
- Opened: 10 May 1913
- Former names: Tairamachi (to 2019)

Passengers
- FY2018: 179 daily

Services
Preceding station	Shimabara Railway	Following station
Kōjiro towards Isahaya	Shimabara Railway Line	Ariake-Yue towards Shimabarakō
Location
- Location within Nagasaki Prefecture Location within Japan

Taira Station (多比良駅, Taira-eki) is a passenger railway station in located in the city of Unzen, Nagasaki. It is operated by third-sector railway company Shimabara Railway.

== Lines ==
The station is served by the Shimabara Railway Line and is located 29.4 km from the starting point of the line at Isahaya.

== Station layout ==
The station is on the ground level with two opposing staggered side platforms. The station building is located adjacent to the south side of the south platform, facing the waiting room located in the middle of the south platform. There are two level crossings connecting the two platforms, the front of the station building, the waiting room, the end of the north platform, and the center of the south platform. The two internal crossings do not have gates or alarms. The station building is a single-story building, and inside it are the station office and a waiting room for passengers. There are no automatic ticket vending machines with tickets being sold at the counter in the waiting room.

=== Platforms ===
1	■ ■ Shimabara Railway Line	for Isahaya
2	■ ■Shimabara Railway Line	for Shimabara and Shimabarakō

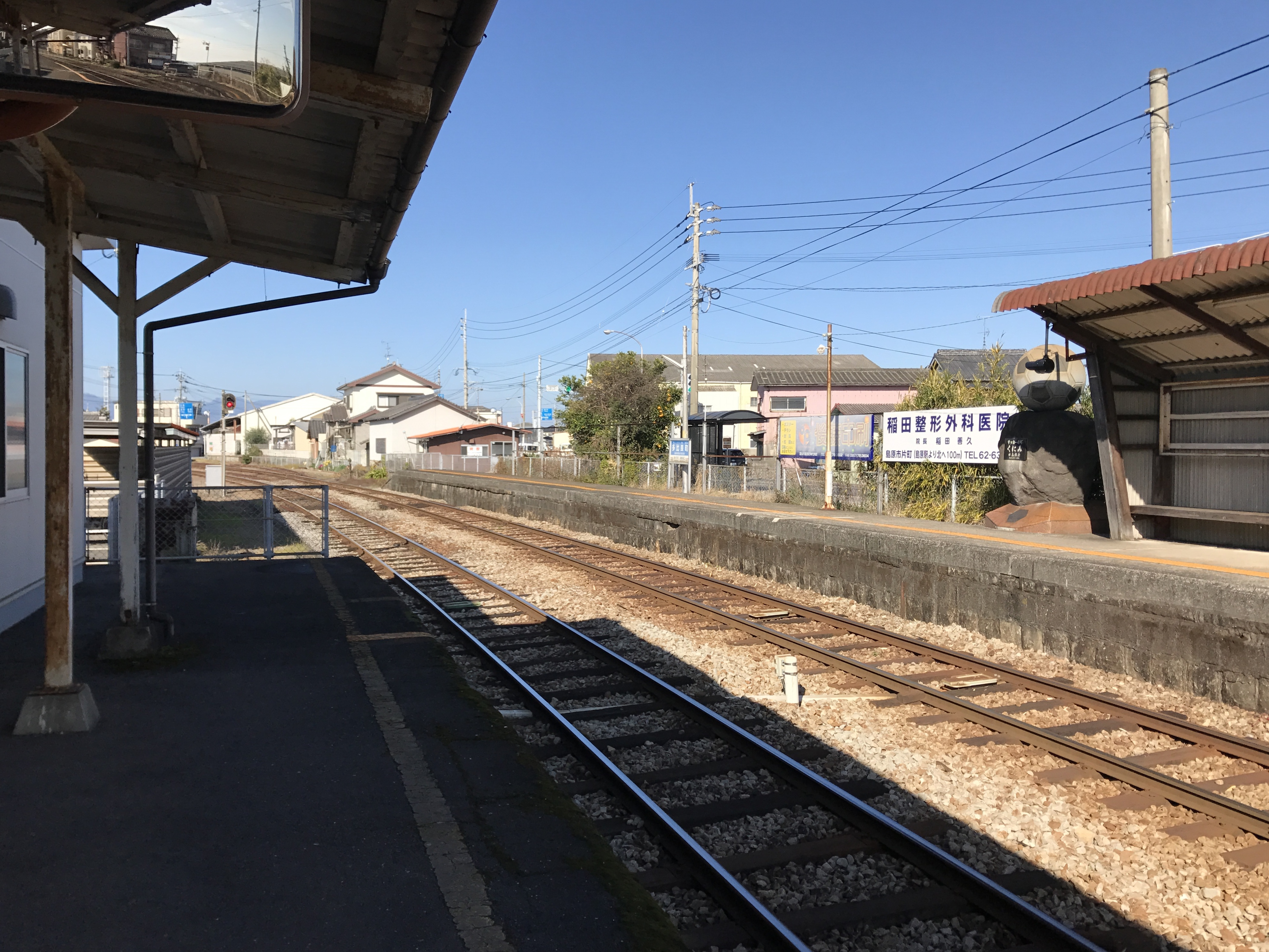
Platforms

== History ==
Taira Station was opened on 10 May 1913 as Tairamachi Station (多比良町駅). The station was renamed to its present name on 1 October 2019.

== Passenger statistics ==
In fiscal 2018, there were a total of 65,356 boarding passengers, given a daily average of 179 passengers.

== Surrounding area ==
- National Route 251
- Unzen City Kunimi General Branch Office (former Kunimi Town Hall)
- Unzen City Kunimi Town Cultural Center

== See also ==
- List of railway stations in Japan
