= Saigō Station =

Railway station in Unzen, Nagasaki Prefecture, Japan

Saigō Station 西郷駅
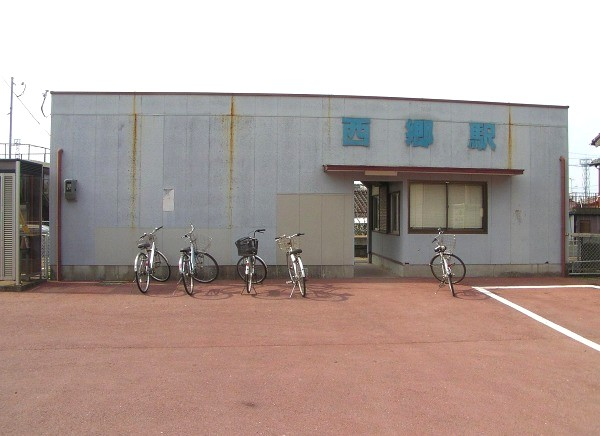
- Saigō Station

General information
- Location: Mizuho-chō, Unzen-shi, Nagasaki-ken 859-1206; Japan
- Coordinates: 32°52′22.03″N 130°14′38.18″E
- Operator: Shimabara Railway
- Line: ■ Shimabara Railway Line
- Distance: 23.0 km from Isahaya
- Platforms: 2 side platforms

Other information
- Status: Unstaffed
- Website: Official website

History
- Opened: 10 October 1912

Passengers
- FY2018: 64 daily

Services
Preceding station	Shimabara Railway	Following station
Taishō towards Isahaya	Shimabara Railway Line	Kōjiro towards Shimabarakō
Location
- Location within Nagasaki Prefecture Location within Japan

Saigō Station (西郷駅, Saigō-eki) is a passenger railway station in located in Mizuho neighborhood of the city of Unzen, Nagasaki. It is operated by third-sector railway company Shimabara Railway.

== Lines ==
The station is served by the Shimabara Railway Line and is located 23.0 km from the starting point of the line at Isahaya.

== Station layout ==
The station is on the ground level with two opposing unnumbered side platforms and two tracks. The two platforms are staggered, with the south platform slightly offset toward Jindaicho and the north platform slightly offset toward Taisho. The two platforms are connected by a level crossing (without barriers or alarms. The station building is adjacent to the south platform, and a waiting room is located on the north platform. The station building is a single-story building, and inside there are toilets, a waiting room, and a station office. It is an unstaffed station.

=== Platforms ===
station side (south)	■ ■ Shimabara Railway Line	for Isahaya
opposite side (north)	■ ■Shimabara Railway Line	for Shimabara and Shimabarakō

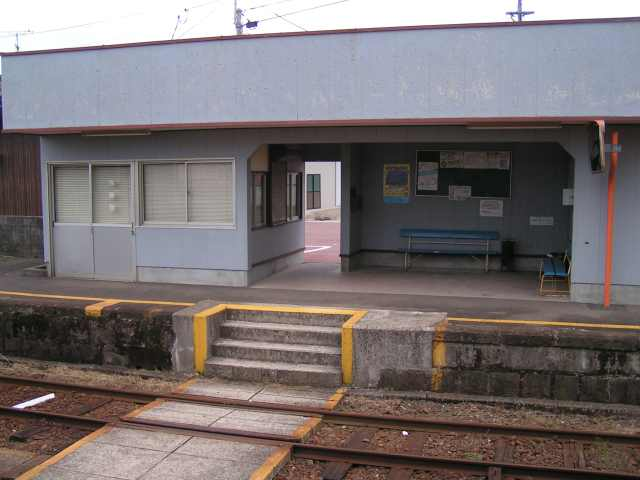
Level crossing

== History ==
Saigō Station was opened on 10 October 1912.

== Passenger statistics ==
In fiscal 2018, there were a total of 23,530 boarding passengers, given a daily average of 64 passengers.

== Surrounding area ==
- National Route 251
- Unzen City Mizuho General Branch Office (formerly Mizuho Town Hall)

== See also ==
- List of railway stations in Japan
