= Kōjiro Station (Nagasaki) =

Railway station in Unzen, Nagasaki Prefecture, Japan

Kōjiro Station 神代駅
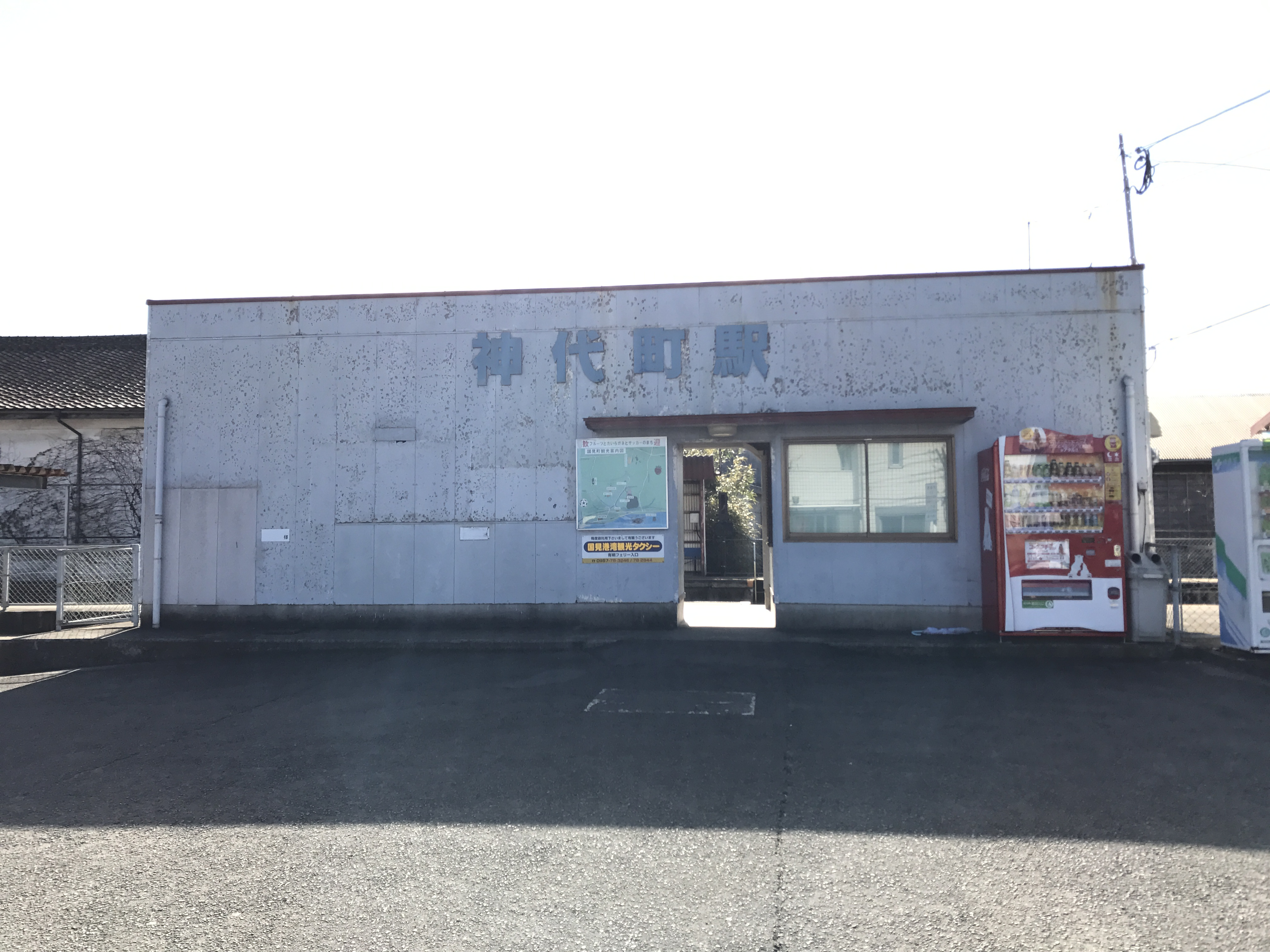
- Kōjiro Station

General information
- Location: Otsu Kunimi-chō Kojiro, Unzen-shi, Nagasaki-ken 859-1302; Japan
- Coordinates: 32°52′17.82″N 130°16′11.16″E
- Operator: Shimabara Railway
- Line: ■ Shimabara Railway Line
- Distance: 25.5 km from Isahaya
- Platforms: 2 side platforms

Other information
- Status: Unstaffed
- Website: Official website

History
- Opened: 10 October 1912
- Former names: Kōjiromachi (to 2019)

Passengers
- FY2018: 195 daily

Services
Preceding station	Shimabara Railway	Following station
Saigō towards Isahaya	Shimabara Railway Line	Taira towards Shimabarakō
Location
- Location within Nagasaki Prefecture Location within Japan

Kōjiro Station (神代駅, Kōjiro-eki) is a passenger railway station in located in the city of Unzen, Nagasaki. It is operated by third-sector railway company Shimabara Railway.

== Lines ==
The station is served by the Shimabara Railway Line and is located 25.5 km from the starting point of the line at Isahaya.

== Station layout ==
The station is on the ground level with two opposing unnumbered side platforms. The tracks run roughly east-west, and the station building is located on the north side of the north platform. The two platforms are connected by level crossing (without barriers or alarms) that runs in front of the station building. A waiting room is located on the south platform, facing the station building across the level crossing. Inside the station building there is a station office, a waiting room, and a toilet. It is an unattended station,.

=== Platforms ===
statuion side (north)	■ ■ Shimabara Railway Line	for Shimabara and Shimabarakō
opposite side (south)	■ ■Shimabara Railway Line	for Isahaya

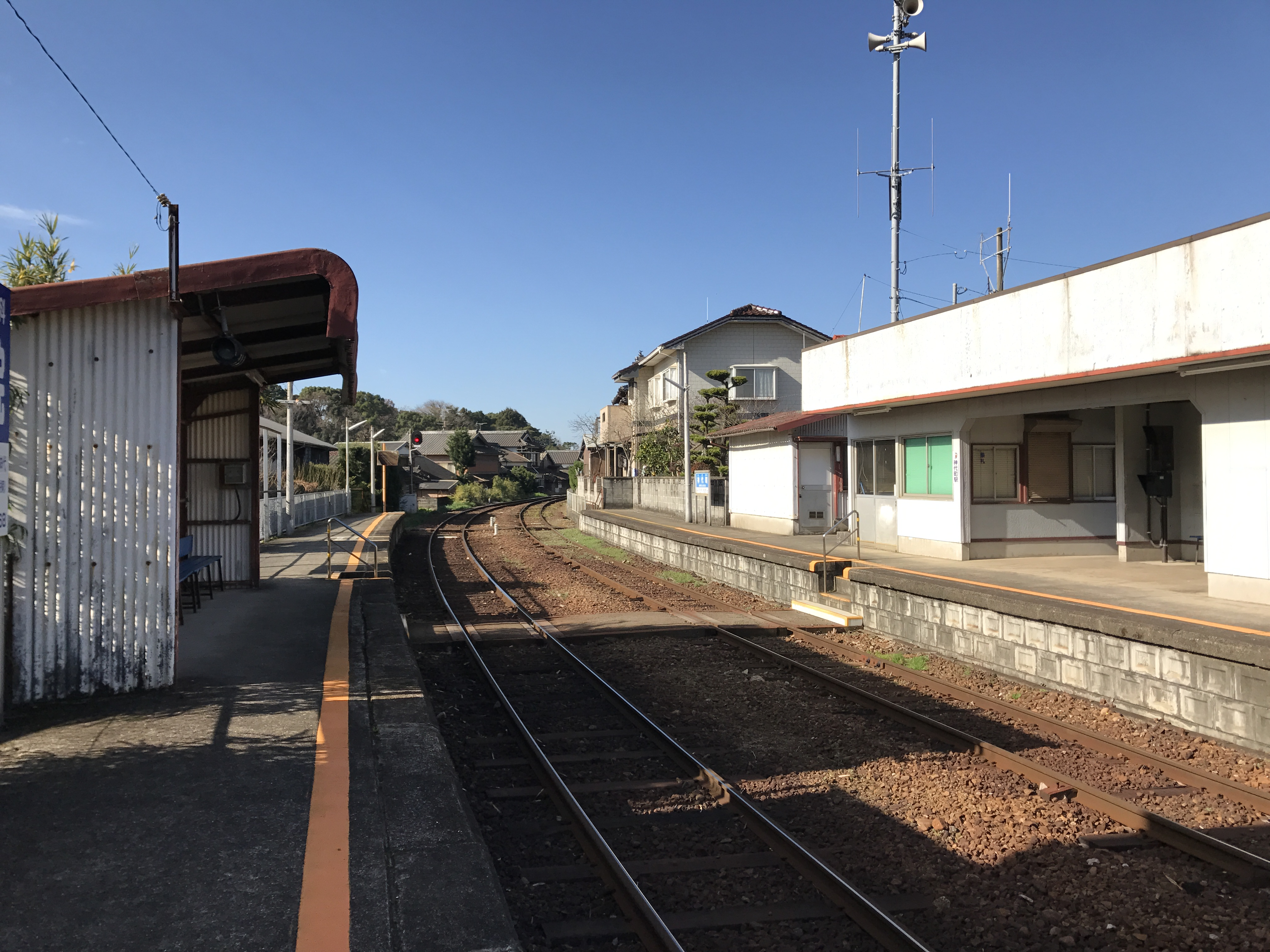
Level crossing

== History ==
Kōjiro Station was opened on 10 October 1912 as Kōjiromachi Station (愛野村駅). The station was renamed to its present name on 1 October 2019.

== Passenger statistics ==
In fiscal 2018, there were a total of 24,399 boarding passengers, given a daily average of 67 passengers.

== Surrounding area ==
- National Route 251
- Unzen City Jindai Elementary School
- Tsurukame Castle Ruins
- Jindai-koji District (Important Preservation District for Groups of Traditional Buildings)

== See also ==
- List of railway stations in Japan
