= Matsuo Station (Nagasaki) =

Railway station in Shimabara, Nagasaki Prefecture, Japan

Matsuo Station 松尾駅
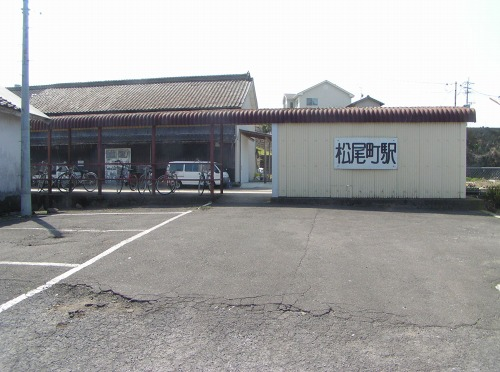
- Station platform in March 2007

General information
- Location: Ko Ariakecho Omisaki, Shimabara-shi, Nagasaki-ken 859-1411; Japan
- Coordinates: 32°50′3.06″N 130°20′51.76″E
- Operator: Shimabara Railway
- Line: ■ Shimabara Railway Line
- Distance: 35.2 km from Isahaya
- Platforms: 1 side platform

Other information
- Status: Unstaffed
- Website: Official website

History
- Opened: 1 May 1931
- Former names: Matsuomachi to 2019

Passengers
- FY2018: 9 daily

Services
Preceding station	Shimabara Railway	Following station
Ōmisaki towards Isahaya	Shimabara Railway Line	Mie towards Shimabarakō
Location
- Location within Nagasaki Prefecture Location within Japan

Matsuo Station (松尾駅, Taira-eki) is a passenger railway station in located in the city of Shimabara, Nagasaki. It is operated by third-sector railway company Shimabara Railway.

== Lines ==
The station is served by the Shimabara Railway Line and is located 35.2 km from the starting point of the line at Isahaya.

== Station layout ==
The station is on the ground level with one side platform and one track. It is an unattended station with no station building. There is a building on the platform that combines a waiting room and bicycle parking area.

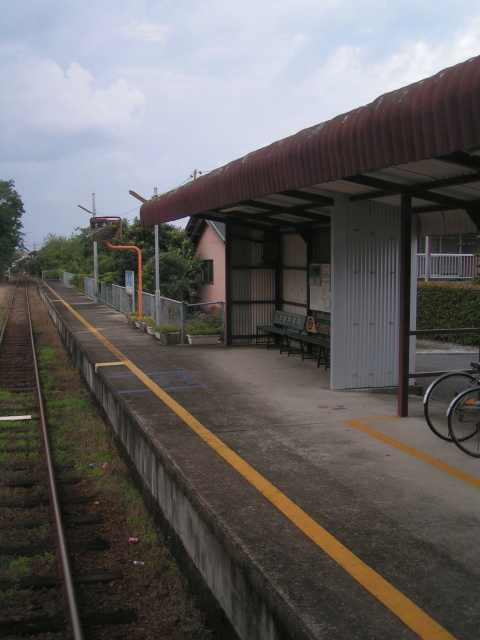
Platforms

== History ==
Matsuo Station was opened on 1 May 1931 as Matsuomachi Station (松尾町駅). The station was renamed to its present name on 1 October 2019.

== Passenger statistics ==
In fiscal 2018, there were a total of 3,310 boarding passengers, given a daily average of 9 passengers.

== Surrounding area ==
- National Route 251
- Matsuo Fishing Port

== See also ==
- List of railway stations in Japan
