= Mie Station =

Railway station in Shimabara, Nagasaki Prefecture, Japan

Mie Station 三会駅
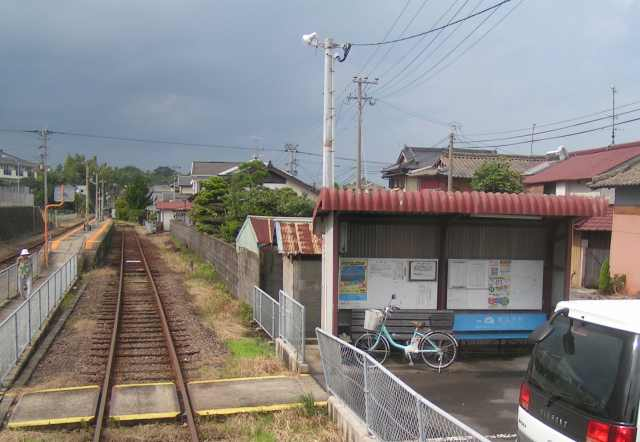
- Narrow station platform (far left) and waiting shelter (right) in March 2007

General information
- Location: Otebaramachi, Shimabara-shi, Nagasaki-ken 855-0012; Japan
- Coordinates: 32°48′54.23″N 130°21′25.96″E
- Operator: Shimabara Railway
- Line: ■ Shimabara Railway Line
- Distance: 37.5 km from Isahaya
- Platforms: 1 island platforms

Other information
- Status: Unstaffed
- Website: Official website

History
- Opened: 24 September 1913

Passengers
- FY2018: 22 daily

Services
Preceding station	Shimabara Railway	Following station
Matsuo towards Isahaya	Shimabara Railway Line	Shimabara towards Shimabarakō
Location
- Location within Nagasaki Prefecture Location within Japan

Mie Station (三会駅, Mie-eki) is a passenger railway station in located in the city of Shimabara, Nagasaki. It is operated by third-sector railway company Shimabara Railway.

== Lines ==
The station is served by the Shimabara Railway Line and is located 37.5 km from the starting point of the line at Isahaya.

== Station layout ==
The station is on the ground level with one island platform and two tracks. The platform is narrow, and there are two benches on the platform. From the Shimabara end of the platform to the east side of the station, there is a level crossing (without alarms or barriers), which serves as the entrance and exit to the station. A covered waiting room is located next to the tracks just outside the level crossing..

=== Platforms ===
1	■ ■ Shimabara Railway Line	for Shimabara and Shimabarakō
2	■ ■Shimabara Railway Line	for Isahaya

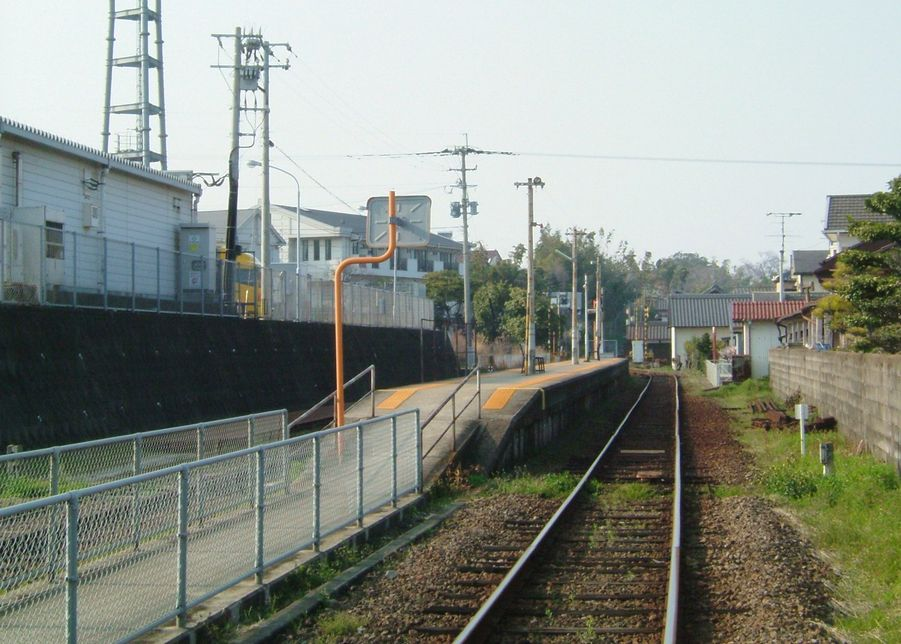
Platform

== History ==
Mie Station was opened on 24 September 1913.

== Passenger statistics ==
In fiscal 2018, there were a total of 8,184 boarding passengers, given a daily average of 22 passengers.

== Surrounding area ==
- National Route 251
- Shimabara Mie Industrial Park

Shimabara City Hall Mie Branch Office Shimabara City Mie Elementary School Shimabara City Mie Junior High School

== See also ==
- List of railway stations in Japan
