= Kantakunosato Station =

Railway station in Isahaya, Nagasaki Prefecture, Japan

Kantakunosato Station 干拓の里駅
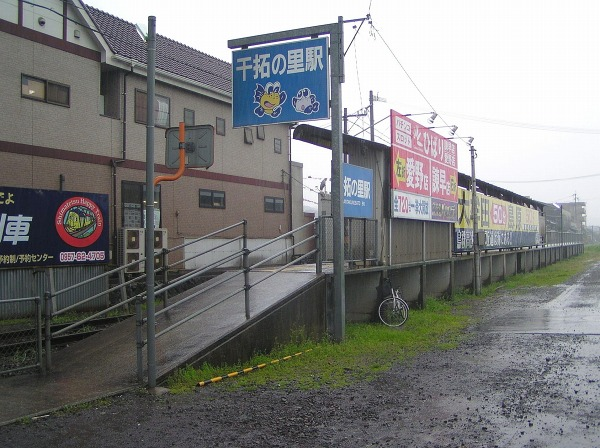
- Kantakunosato Station

General information
- Location: Ono-machi, Isahaya-shi, Nagasaki -ken 854-0034; Japan
- Coordinates: 32°50′10.48″N 130°5′36.31″E
- Operator: Shimabara Railway
- Line: ■ Shimabara Railway Line
- Distance: 5.5 km from Isahaya
- Platforms: 1 side platform

Other information
- Status: Unstaffed
- Website: Official website

History
- Opened: 20 April 1995

Passengers
- FY2018: 47 daily

Services
Preceding station	Shimabara Railway	Following station
Ono towards Isahaya	Shimabara Railway Line	Moriyama towards Shimabarakō
Location
- Location within Nagasaki Prefecture Location within Japan

Kantakunosato Station (干拓の里駅, Kantakunosato-eki) is a passenger railway station in located in the city of Isahaya, Nagasaki. It is operated by third-sector railway company Shimabara Railway.

== Lines ==
The station is served by the Shimabara Railway Line and is located 5.5 km from the starting point of the line at Isahaya.

== Station layout ==
The station consists of one side platform located on the north side of a single track. There is no station building, but there is a roof over the platform. Part of the space under the platform is also used as a bicycle parking area. The station is unattended..

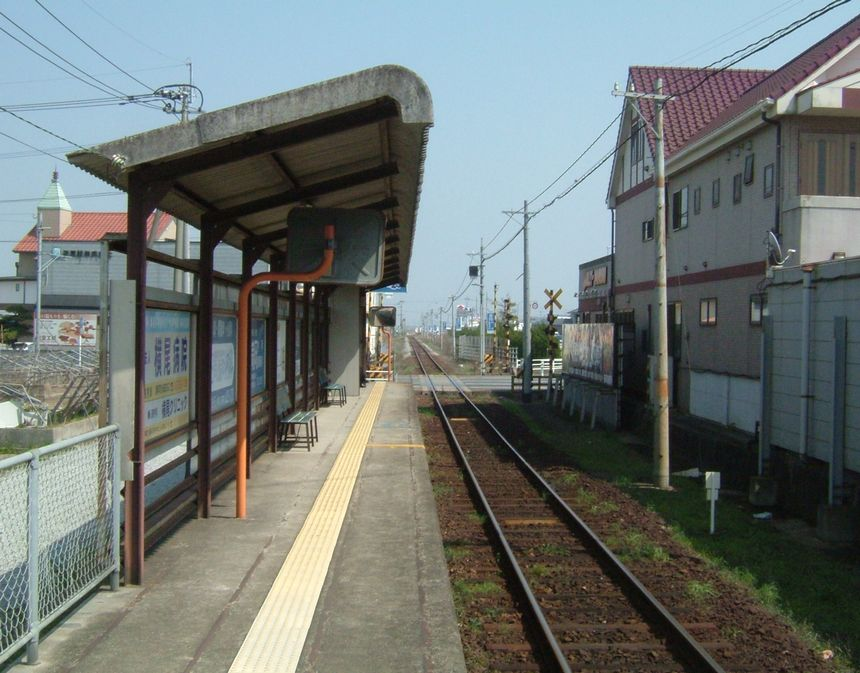
Platform

== History ==
Kantakunosato Station was opened on 20 April 1995.

== Passenger statistics ==
In fiscal 2018, there were a total of 16983 boarding passengers, given a daily average of 47 passengers.

== Surrounding area ==
- Isahaya City Ono Junior High School
- Isahaya City Hall Ono Branch Office

== See also ==
- List of railway stations in Japan
