= Isahaya-higashi-kōkō Station =

Railway station in Isahaya, Nagasaki Prefecture, Japan

Isahaya-higashi-kōkō Station 諫早東高校駅
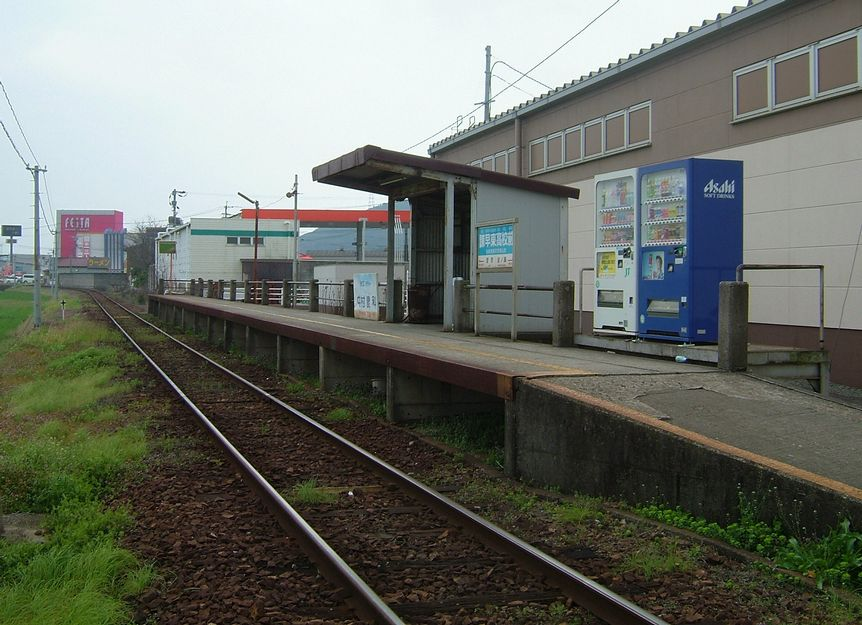
- March 2008

General information
- Location: Moriyamacho Sugitani, Isahaya-shi, Nagasaki-ken 854-0205; Japan
- Coordinates: 32°49′25.21″N 130°8′56.85″E
- Operator: Shimabara Railway
- Line: ■ Shimabara Railway Line
- Distance: 11.4 km from Isahaya
- Platforms: 1 side platform

Other information
- Status: Unstaffed
- Website: Official website

History
- Opened: 12 November 1984
- Former names: Isahaya-higashi-kōkōmae to 2019

Passengers
- FY2018: 124 daily

Services
Preceding station	Shimabara Railway	Following station
Kamanohana towards Isahaya	Shimabara Railway Line	Aino towards Shimabarakō
Location
- Location within Nagasaki Prefecture Location within Japan

Isahaya-higashi-kōkō Station (諫早東高校駅, Isahaya-higashi-kōkō-eki) is a passenger railway station in located in the city of Isahaya, Nagasaki. It is operated by third-sector railway company Shimabara Railway.

== Lines ==
The station is served by the Shimabara Railway Line and is located 11.4 km from the starting point of the line at Isahaya.

== Station layout ==
The station consists of one side platform located on the west side of a single track. There is no station building, but a simple waiting room installed on the platform The station is unattended.

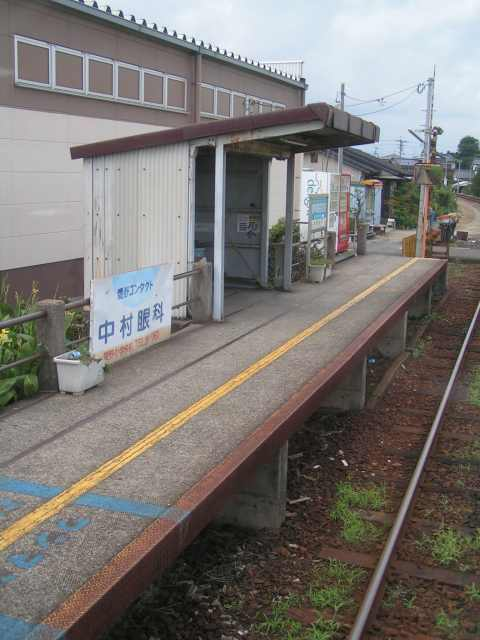
Platform

== History ==
Isahaya-higashi-kōkō Stationwas opened as Isahaya-higashi-kōkōmae Station on 12 November 1984, and was renamed to its present name on 1 October 2019.

== Passenger statistics ==
In fiscal 2018, there were a total of 45,218 boarding passengers, given a daily average of 124 passengers.

== Surrounding area ==
- Nagasaki Prefectural Isahaya Higashi High School

== See also ==
- List of railway stations in Japan
