= Reikyūkōen-Taiikukan Station =

Railway station in Shimabara, Nagasaki Prefecture, Japan

Reikūkōen-Taiikukan Station (Note: Platform signage displays the romanised spelling of this station as Reikūkōentaiikukan, though Reikūkōen-Taiikukan is also common usage.) 霊丘公園体育館駅
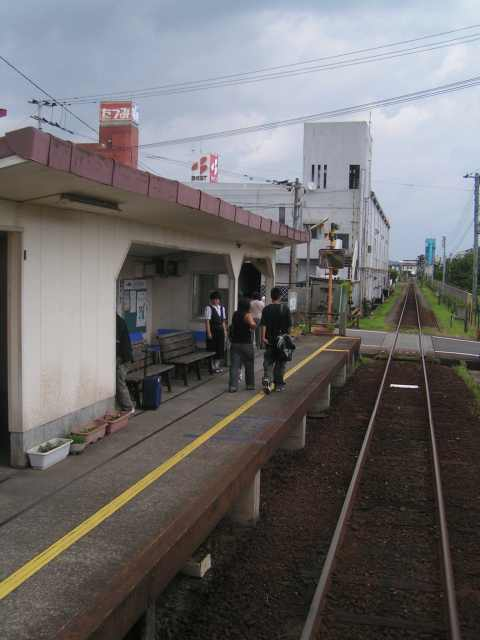
- Station platform in August 2006

General information
- Location: 2 Chome Bentenmachi, Shimabara-shi, Nagasaki-ken 855-0802; Japan
- Coordinates: 32°46′56.2″N 130°22′27.1″E
- Operator: Shimabara Railway
- Line: ■ Shimabara Railway Line
- Distance: 41.5km from Isahaya
- Platforms: 1 side platform

Other information
- Status: Unstaffed
- Website: Official website

History
- Opened: 13 November 1984
- Former names: Shimatetsu Honshamae (to 2019)

Passengers
- FY2018: 44 daily

Services
Preceding station	Shimabara Railway	Following station
Shimabara towards Isahaya	Shimabara Railway Line	Shimabara-Funatsu towards Shimabarakō
Location
- Location within Nagasaki Prefecture Location within Japan

Reikūkōen-Taiikukan Station (霊丘公園体育館駅, Reikūkōen-taiikukan-eki) is a passenger railway station in located in the city of Shimabara, Nagasaki. It is operated by third-sector railway company Shimabara Railway.

== Lines ==
The station is served by the Shimabara Railway Line and is located 41.5 km from the starting point of the line at Isahaya.

== Station layout ==
The station is on the ground level with oneside platform serving a single bi-directional track. The station building is located on the platform, and the station is unattended.

== History ==
Reikūkōen-Taiikukan Station was opened on 12 November 1984 as Shimatetsu Honshamae Station (島鉄本社前駅). The station was renamed to its present name on 1 October 2019.

== Passenger statistics ==
In fiscal 2018, there were a total of 16,054 boarding passengers, given a daily average of 44 passengers.

== Surrounding area ==
- Shimabara Tax Office
- Shimabara City Arima Martial Arts Hall
- Shimabara City Reikyu Park Gymnasium

== See also ==
- List of railway stations in Japan
