= Saigō =

Saigō may refer to:

== Places ==
- Saigō, Shimane a town located on the island of Dōgo in Oki District
- Saigō Station a passenger railway station in located in Mizuho
- Saigō, Miyazaki a village located in Higashiusuki District, Miyazaki Prefecture

== People ==
- Saigō-no-Tsubone (Lady Saigō) (1552–1589), consort of Tokugawa Ieyasu, the samurai lord and shōgun
- Saigō Jūdō (西郷 従道; 1843–1902), Japanese politician and admiral
- Shiro Saigo (西郷四郎; 1866–1922), one of the earliest disciples of Judo
- Saigō Takamori (西郷 隆盛; 1828–1877), Japanese samurai and politician
- Saigō Tanomo (西郷 頼母; 1830–1903), Japanese samurai
- Teruhiko Saigō (西郷 輝彦; 1947–2022), Japanese singer and actor
