= Kōjiro Station =

Kōjiro Station may refer to:

- Kōjiro Station (Yamaguchi) in Iwakuni, Yamaguchi, Japan
- Kōjiro Station (Nagasaki) in Unzen, Nagasaki, Japan
