= Shimabara Railway Line =

Railway line in Nagasaki Prefecture, Japan

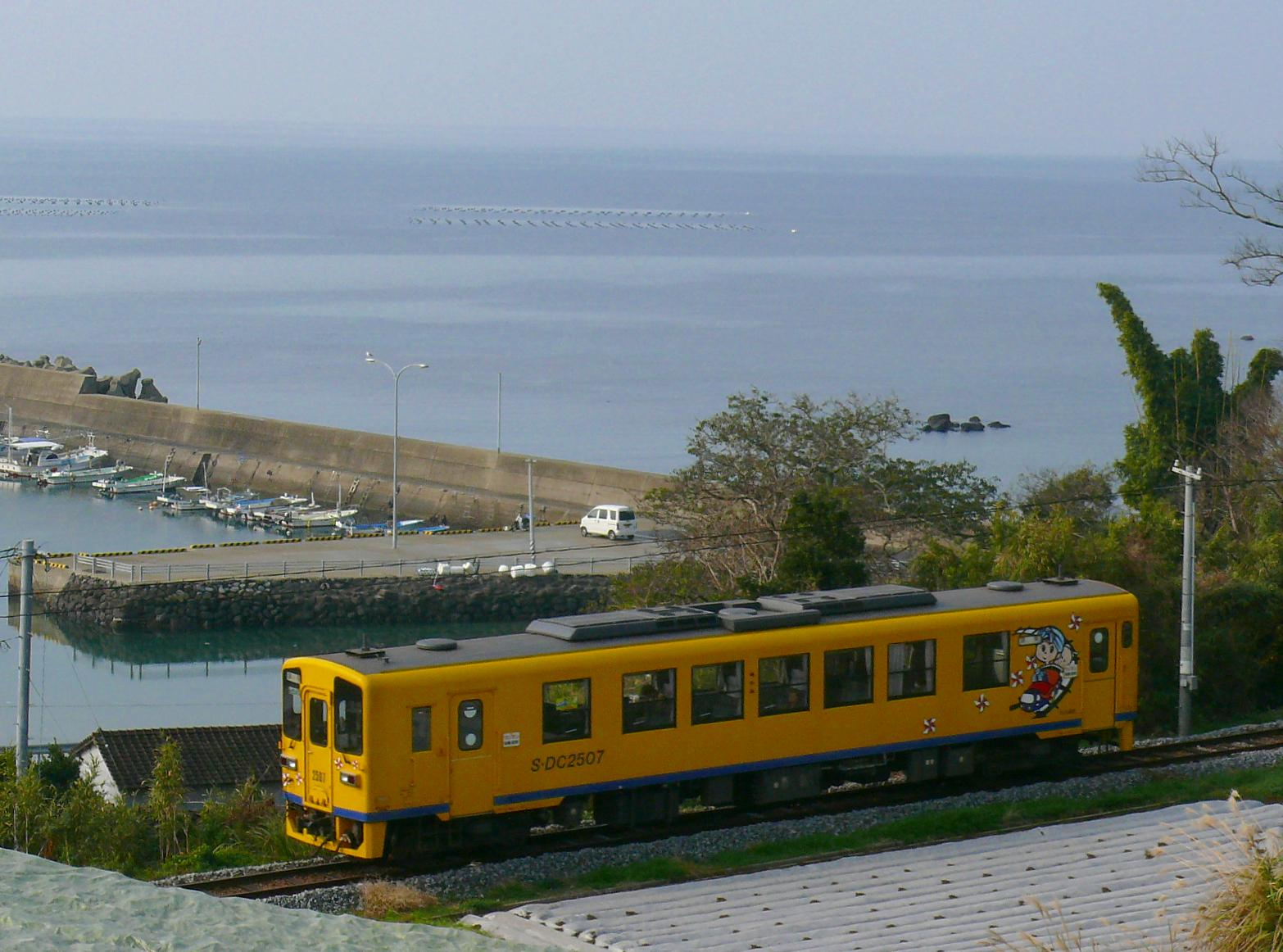
- Train on the Shimabara Railway Line at Shirahama Beach, 2008

Overview
- Locale: Shimabara Peninsula, Nagasaki Prefecture, Japan
- Termini: Isahaya; Shimabarakō
- Stations: 24

Service
- Rolling stock: KiHa 2500

History
- Opened: 20 June 1911; 114 years ago
- Shimabarakō – Kazusa closed: 1 April 2008

Technical
- Line length: 43.2 km (26.8 mi)
- Number of tracks: 1
- Track gauge: 1,067 mm (3 ft 6 in)

The Shimabara Railway Line (Japanese: 島原鉄道線, Hepburn: Shimabara Tetsudō-sen) is a Japanese railway line in Nagasaki Prefecture connecting Isahaya Station in Isahaya and Shimabarakō Station in Shimabara. The line parallels the coast of the Shimabara Peninsula. The third-sector railway company Shimabara Railway owns the line and also operates buses and ferries.

== History ==
Shimabara Railroad was established in 1908. Shimabara Railroad acquired permit to operate the railway line in 1909 and began constructing it in 1910. The company opened the Isahaya – Aino section on 20 June 1911, extending the line to Minami-Shimabara in 1913.

The Kuchinotsu Railway Co. opened the Minami-Shimabara – Dozaki section in 1922, extending the line to Harajo in 1926 and Kazusa two years later.

Diesel power was introduced by the Kuchinotsu Railway Co. in 1930, and by the Shimabara Railway Co. in 1934. In 1943 the two companies merged under the name Shimabara Railway Co.

In 1958 direct services to/from Nagasaki were introduced, operating until 1980.

The portion of the line between Shimabarakō and Kazusa had few passengers and closed on 1 April 2008.

Until 2008 the line used the older diesel-powered KiHa 20 series diesel railcars which were developed in the mid-1950s. Because of the line's vintage trains which maintained the old Japanese National Railways colors of red and beige, it remained popular among train enthusiasts.

=== Former connecting lines ===
- The Hizen Obama Railway Co. opened a 17 km line from Aino station to Unzen Obama between 1923 and 1927. Direct services from the Shimabara line operated from 1927 until 1932. The line closed in 1938.

=== Volcanic disruptions ===
Services were disrupted for six months in 1991 owing to lava flows from Mount Unzen, which also caused a one-month service disruption the following year.

In 1993 a major lava flow forced the closure of the line between Shimabarakō and Fukae, and services did not resume on that section until 1997.

== Infrastructure ==
=== Stations list ===
Legend:

●	All trains stop
▲	Some trains stop
｜	All trains pass

Station	Distance (km)	Local	Express	Connecting lines	Location	
Isahaya	0.0	●	●	Nishi Kyushu Shinkansen; Nagasaki Line; Ōmura Line	Isahaya	Nagasaki; Prefecture
Hon-Isahaya	1.5	●	●		Isahaya	Nagasaki; Prefecture
Saiwai	2.9	●	▲		Isahaya	Nagasaki; Prefecture
Ono	4.8	●	▲		Isahaya	Nagasaki; Prefecture
Kantakunosato	5.5	●	▲		Isahaya	Nagasaki; Prefecture
Moriyama	7.5	●	▲		Isahaya	Nagasaki; Prefecture
Kamanohana	9.6	●	▲		Isahaya	Nagasaki; Prefecture
Isahaya-higashi-kōkō	11.4	●	▲		Isahaya	Nagasaki; Prefecture
Aino	12.4	●	●		Unzen	Nagasaki; Prefecture
Abozaki	14.4	●	｜		Unzen	Nagasaki; Prefecture
Azuma	16.6	●	●		Unzen	Nagasaki; Prefecture
Kobe	19.6	●	｜		Unzen	Nagasaki; Prefecture
Taishō	20.8	●	｜		Unzen	Nagasaki; Prefecture
Saigō	23.0	●	●		Unzen	Nagasaki; Prefecture
Kōjiro	25.5	●	●		Unzen	Nagasaki; Prefecture
Taira	29.4	●	●		Unzen	Nagasaki; Prefecture
Ariake-Yue	31.8	●	｜		Shimabara	Nagasaki; Prefecture
Ōmisaki	34.1	●	●		Shimabara	Nagasaki; Prefecture
Matsuo	35.2	●	｜		Shimabara	Nagasaki; Prefecture
Mie	37.5	●	｜		Shimabara	Nagasaki; Prefecture
Shimabara	40.5	●	●		Shimabara	Nagasaki; Prefecture
Reikyūkōen-Taiikukan	41.5	●	●		Shimabara	Nagasaki; Prefecture
Shimabara-Funatsu	42.3	●	●		Shimabara	Nagasaki; Prefecture
Shimabarakō	43.2	●	●		Shimabara	Nagasaki; Prefecture

=== Rolling stock ===
KiHa 2500 series diesel railcar operates in the line with 15 railcars manufactured by Niigata Iron Works between 1994 and 2011.

== See also ==
- List of railway companies in Japan
- List of railway lines in Japan
