= Shimabara Station =

Railway station in Shimabara, Nagasaki Prefecture, Japan

Shimabara Station 島原駅
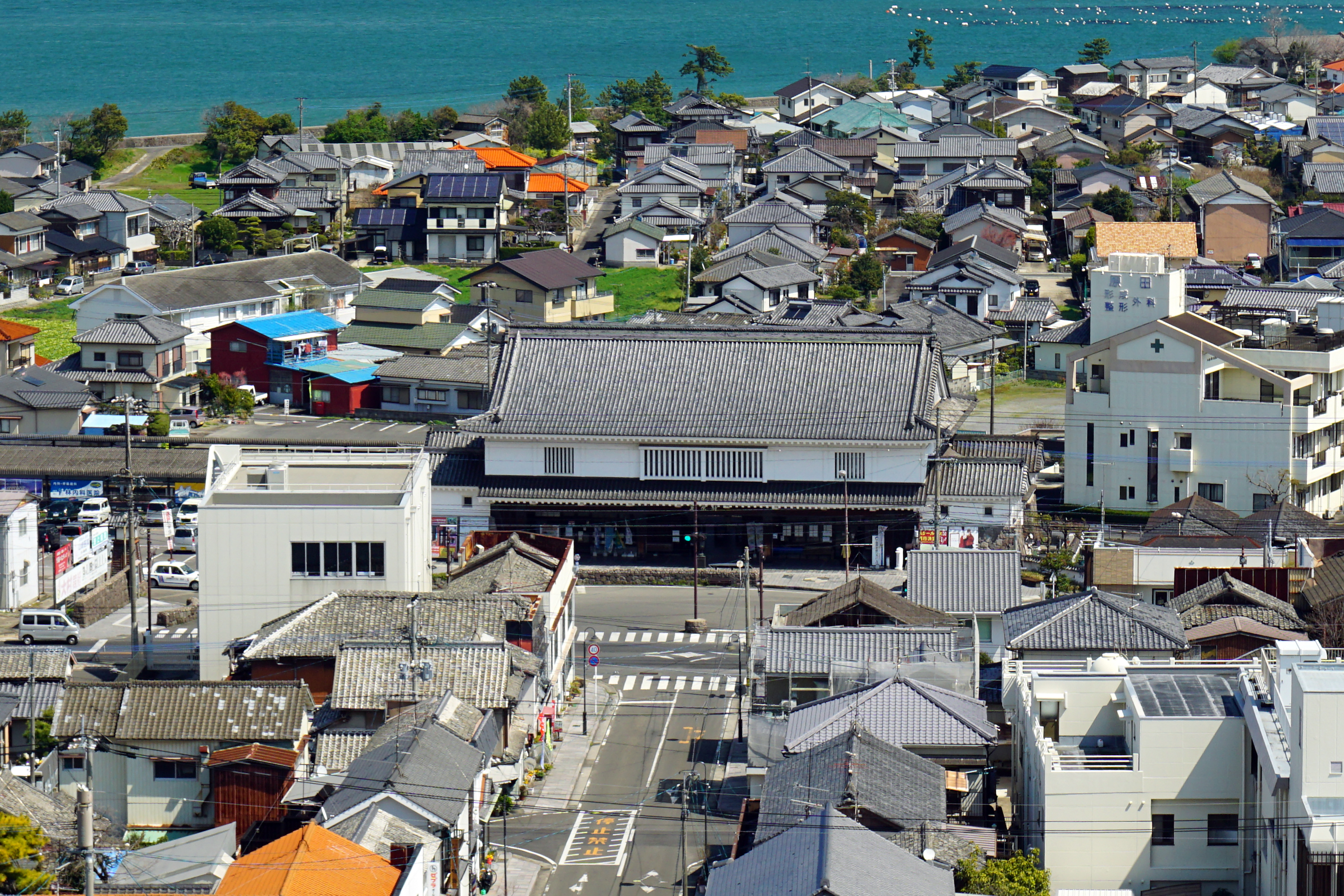
- Shimabara Station

General information
- Location: 577-1 Katamachi, Shimabara-shi, Nagasaki-ken; Japan
- Coordinates: 32°47′24.53″N 130°22′13.98″E
- Operator: Shimabara Railway
- Line: ■ Shimabara Railway Line
- Distance: 40.5 km from Isahaya
- Platforms: 2 side platforms

Other information
- Status: Staffed
- Website: Official website

History
- Opened: 24 September 1913

Passengers
- FY2018: 438 daily

Services
Preceding station	Shimabara Railway	Following station
Mie towards Isahaya	Shimabara Railway Line	Reikyūkōen-Taiikukan towards Shimabarakō
Location
- Location within Nagasaki Prefecture Location within Japan

Shimabara Station (島原駅, Taira-eki) is a passenger railway station in located in the city of Shimabara, Nagasaki. It is operated by third-sector railway company Shimabara Railway.

== Lines ==
The station is served by the Shimabara Railway Line and is located 40.5 km from the starting point of the line at Isahaya.

== Station layout ==
The station is on the ground level with two opposing side platforms and two tracks. The distinctive station building is modeled after the Otemon Gate of Shimabara Castle. As a directly managed station, it has automatic ticket vending machines and a ticket window. Connecting tickets are also sold. The platform and station building are connected by level crossing equipped with an alarm..

=== Platforms ===
1	■ ■ Shimabara Railway Line	for Isahaya
2	■ ■Shimabara Railway Line	for Shimabarakō

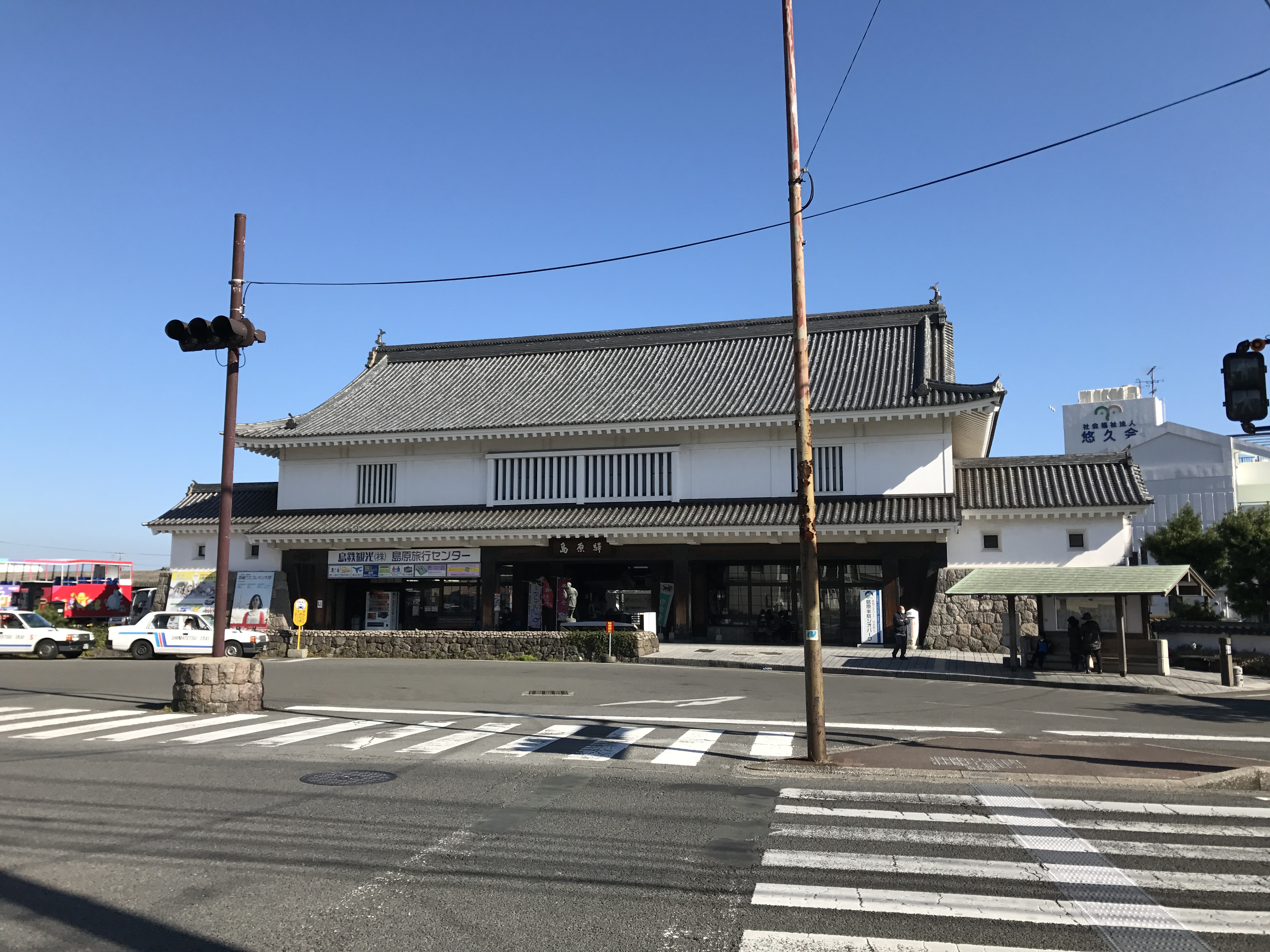
Station building

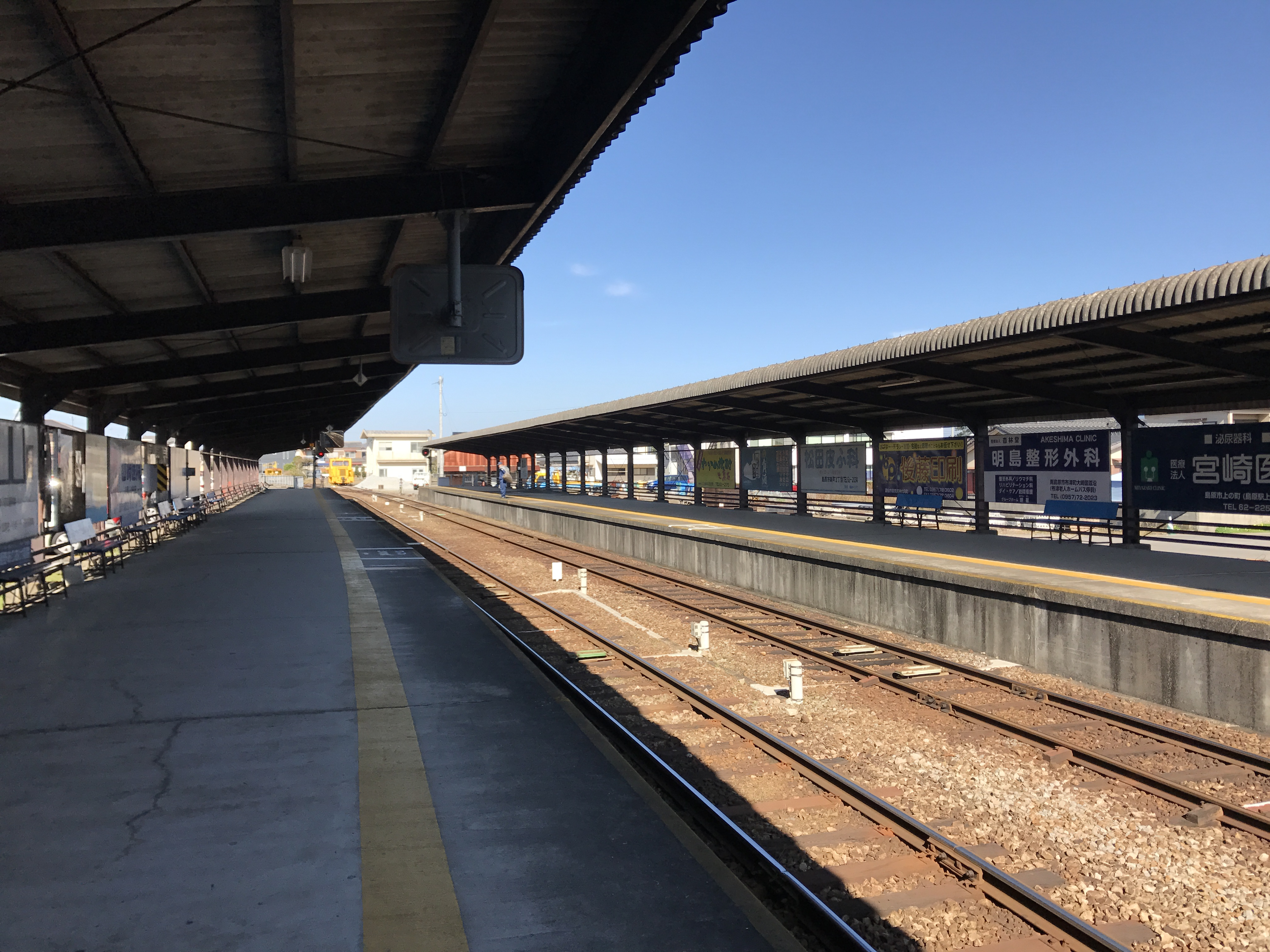
Platform

== History ==
Shimabara Station was opened on 24 September 1913. The current station building was completed in December 1989.

== Passenger statistics ==
In fiscal 2018, there were a total of 159,737 boarding passengers, given a daily average of 438 passengers.

== Surrounding area ==
- National Route 251
- Shimabara City Office
- Shimabara Post Office
- Shimabara Castle

== See also ==
- List of railway stations in Japan
