= Shimabarakō Station =

Railway station in Shimabara, Nagasaki Prefecture, Japan

Shimabarakō Station 島原港駅
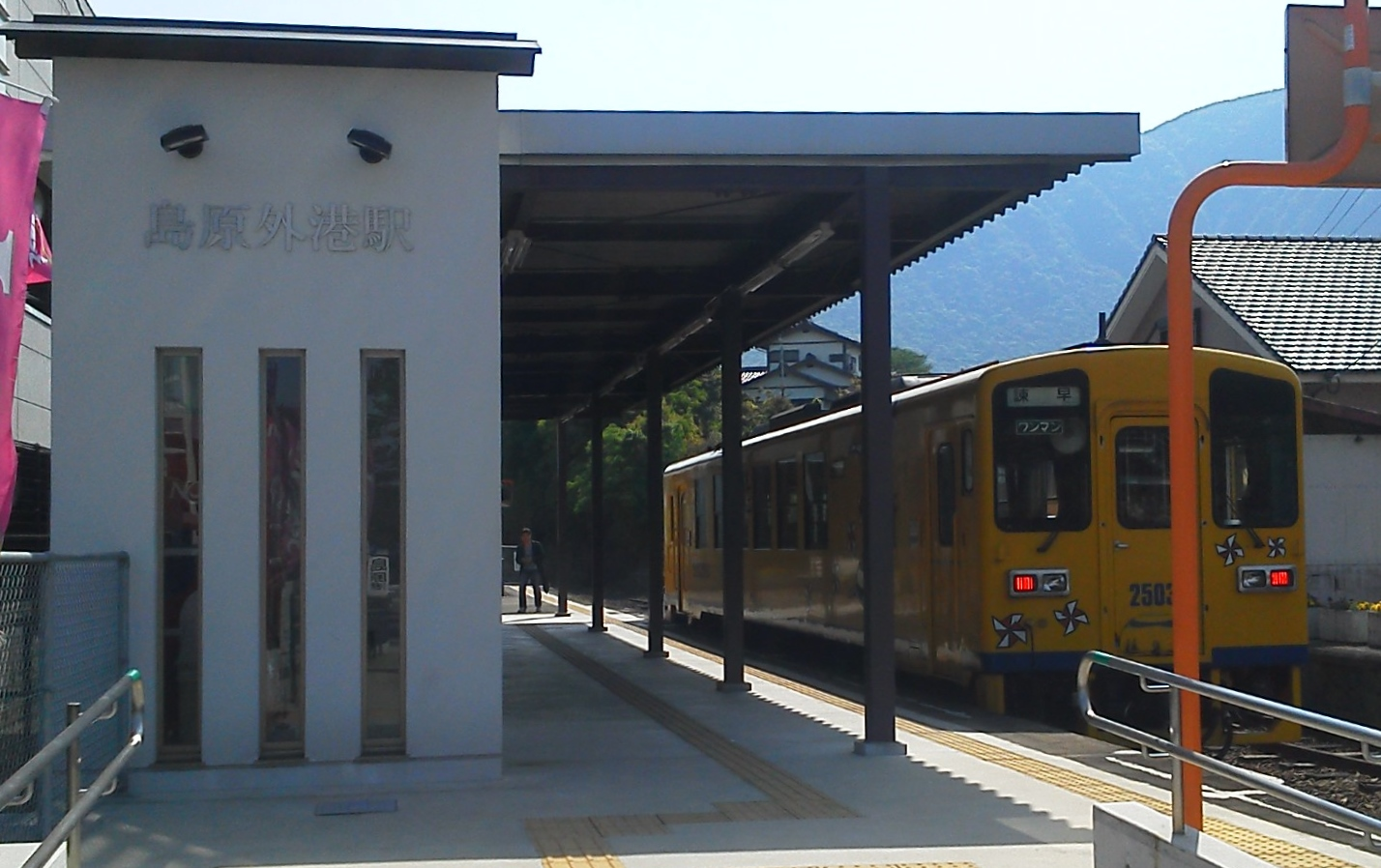
- Station platform in April 2013

General information
- Location: Shimokawashirimachi, Shimabara-shi, Nagasaki-ken 855-0861; Japan
- Coordinates: 32°46′7.9″N 130°22′13.8″E
- Operator: Shimabara Railway
- Line: ■ Shimabara Railway Line
- Distance: 43.2 km from Isahaya
- Platforms: 1 side platform

Construction
- Accessible: Wheelchair accessible with ramps

Other information
- Status: Unstaffed
- Website: Official website

History
- Opened: 11 November 1960
- Former names: Shimabara Gaikō (to 2019)

Passengers
- FY2018: 68 daily

Services
Preceding station	Shimabara Railway	Following station
Reikyūkōen-Taiikukan towards Isahaya	Shimabara Railway Line	Terminus
Location
- Location within Nagasaki Prefecture Location within Japan

Shimabarakō Station (島原港駅; Shimabarakō-eki) is a passenger railway station in located in the city of Shimabara, Nagasaki. It is operated by third-sector railway company Shimabara Railway.

== Lines ==
The station is the terminus of the Shimabara Railway Line and is located 43.2 km from the opposing terminus of the line at Isahaya.

== Station layout ==
The station is on the ground level with one side platform and one track. It is an unattended station and does not have automatic ticket vending machines. Before the switching facilities were abolished in 1997, there were two opposing side platforms and two tracks. The unused platform and tracks still exist, but the level crossing between the station building and the station building has been filled in, making it impossible to enter, and the switch part of the track has been removed.

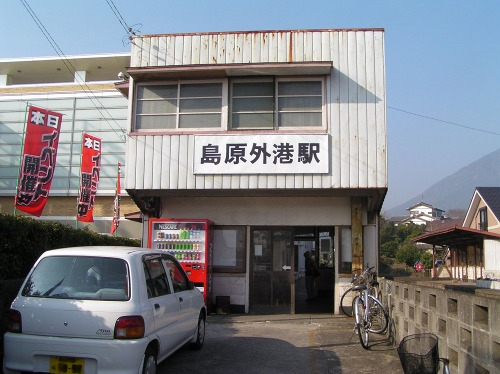
Station entrance in August 2007

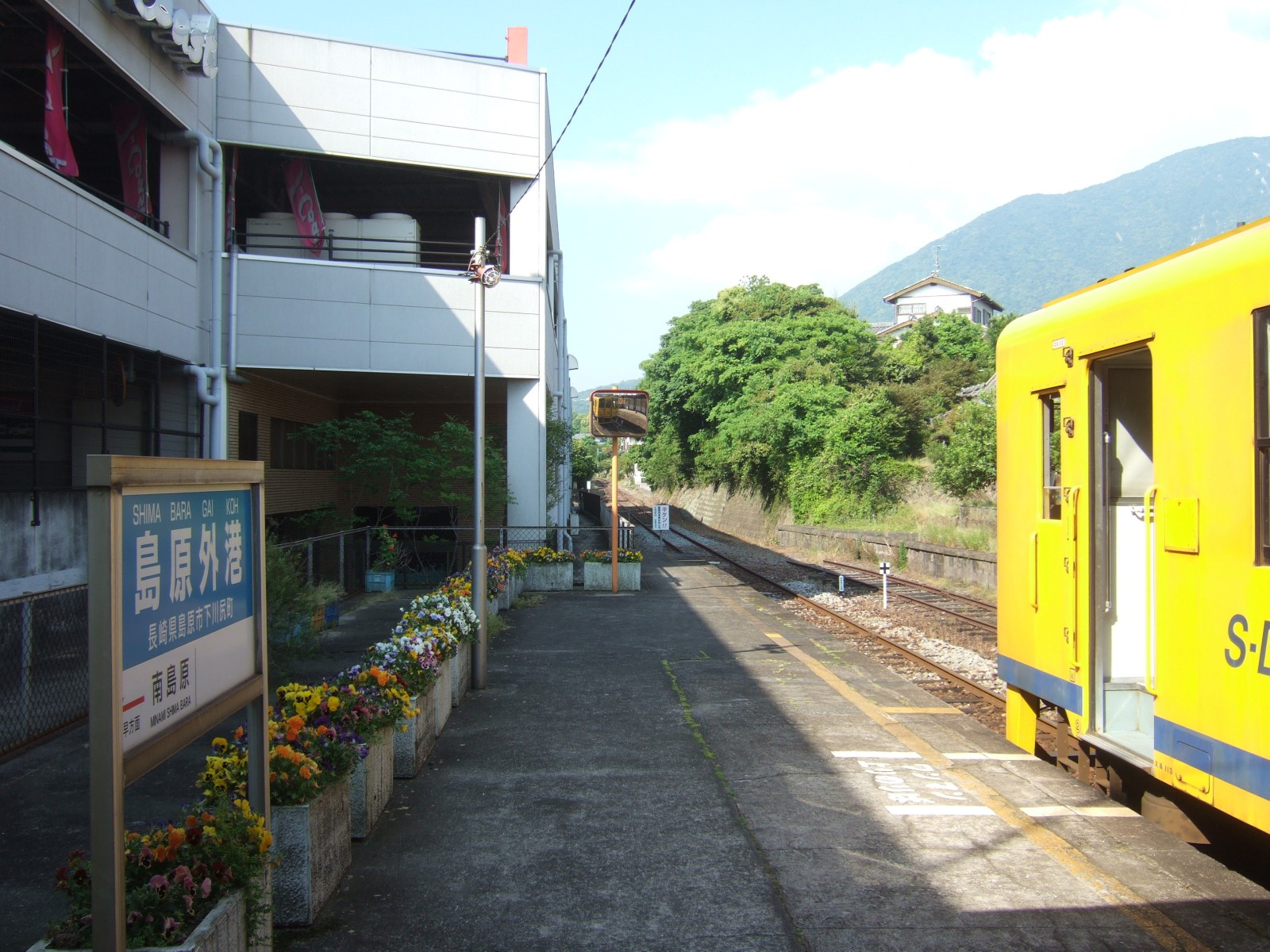
View of now-closed section of the line in 2010

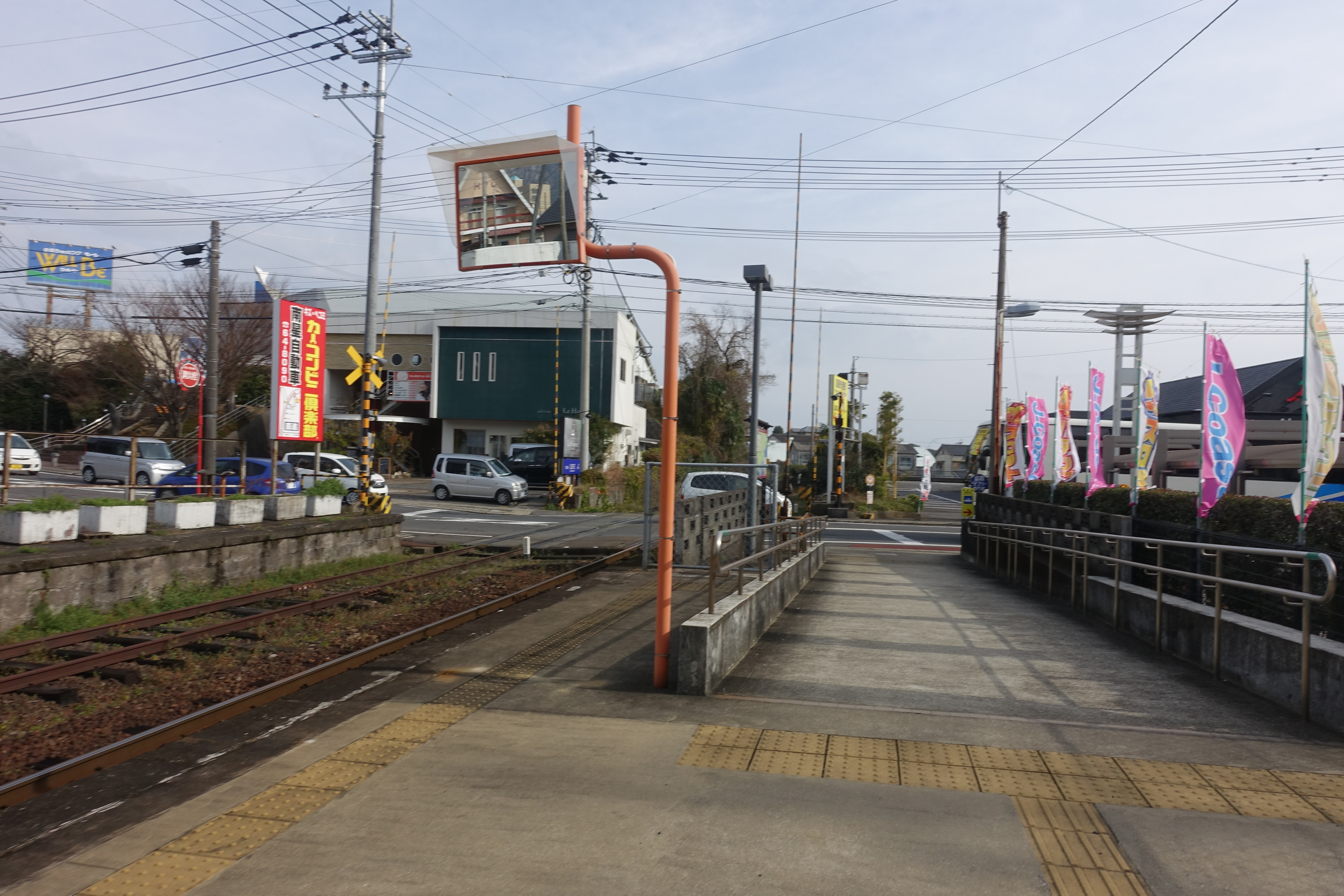
View back towards the street in February 2017

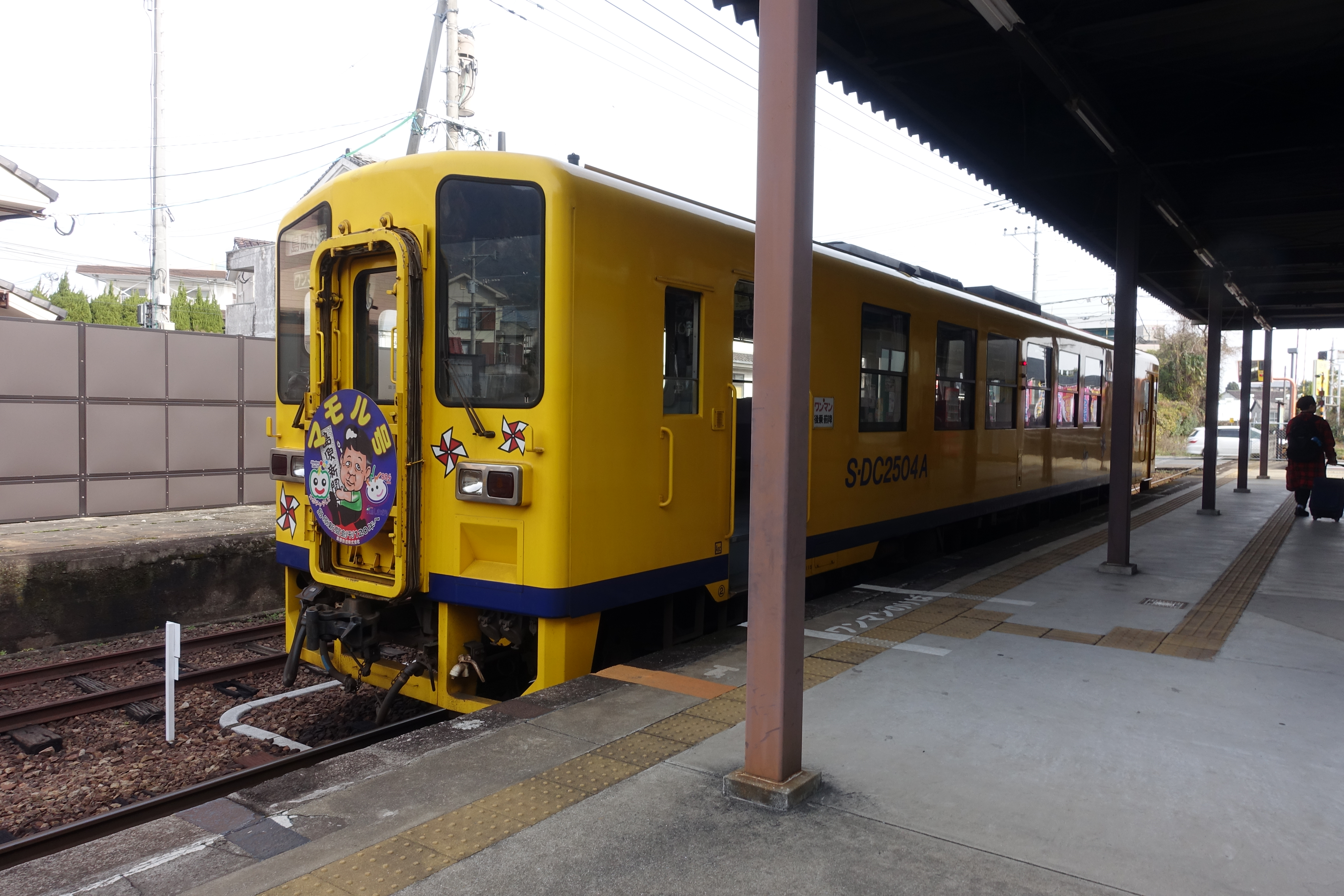
Colourful Shimabara Railway railcar at the station February 2017

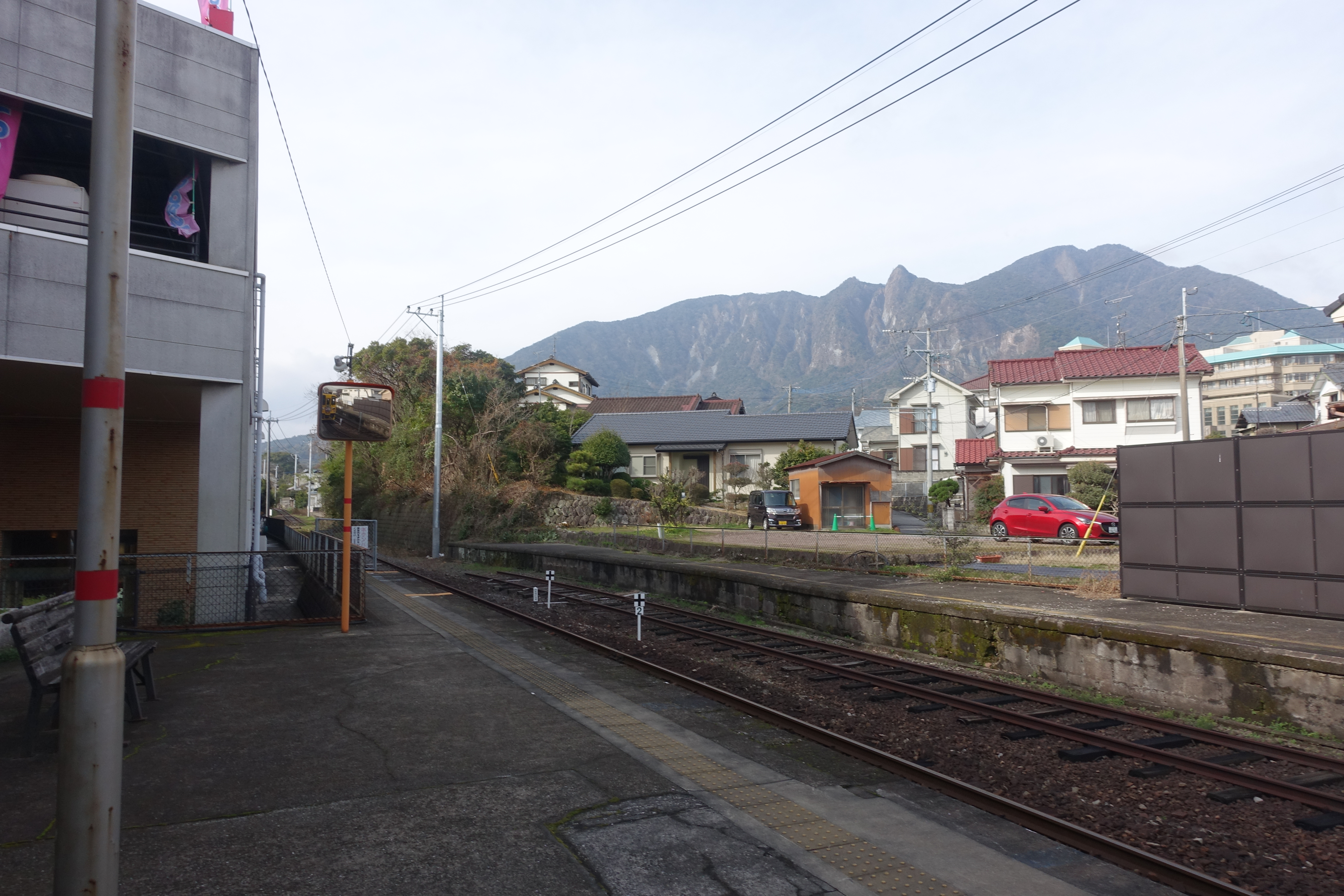
Outer platform in February 2017

== History ==
Shimabarakō Station was opened on 11 November 1960 as Shimabara Gaikō Station (島原外港駅). The original station building was completely destroyed by fire on 2 November 2010. The station was renamed to its present name on 1 October 2019.

== Passenger statistics ==
In fiscal 2018, there were a total of 24,905 boarding passengers, given a daily average of 68 passengers.

== Surrounding area ==
- National Route 251
- Shimabara Port
- Nagasaki Prefectural Shimabara Hospital (formerly Nagasaki Prefectural Shimabara Onsen Hospital)
- Shimabara City Second Junior High School

== See also ==
- List of railway stations in Japan
