= Japan National Route 251 =

Road in Nagasaki prefecture, Japan

National Route 251
- 国道251号
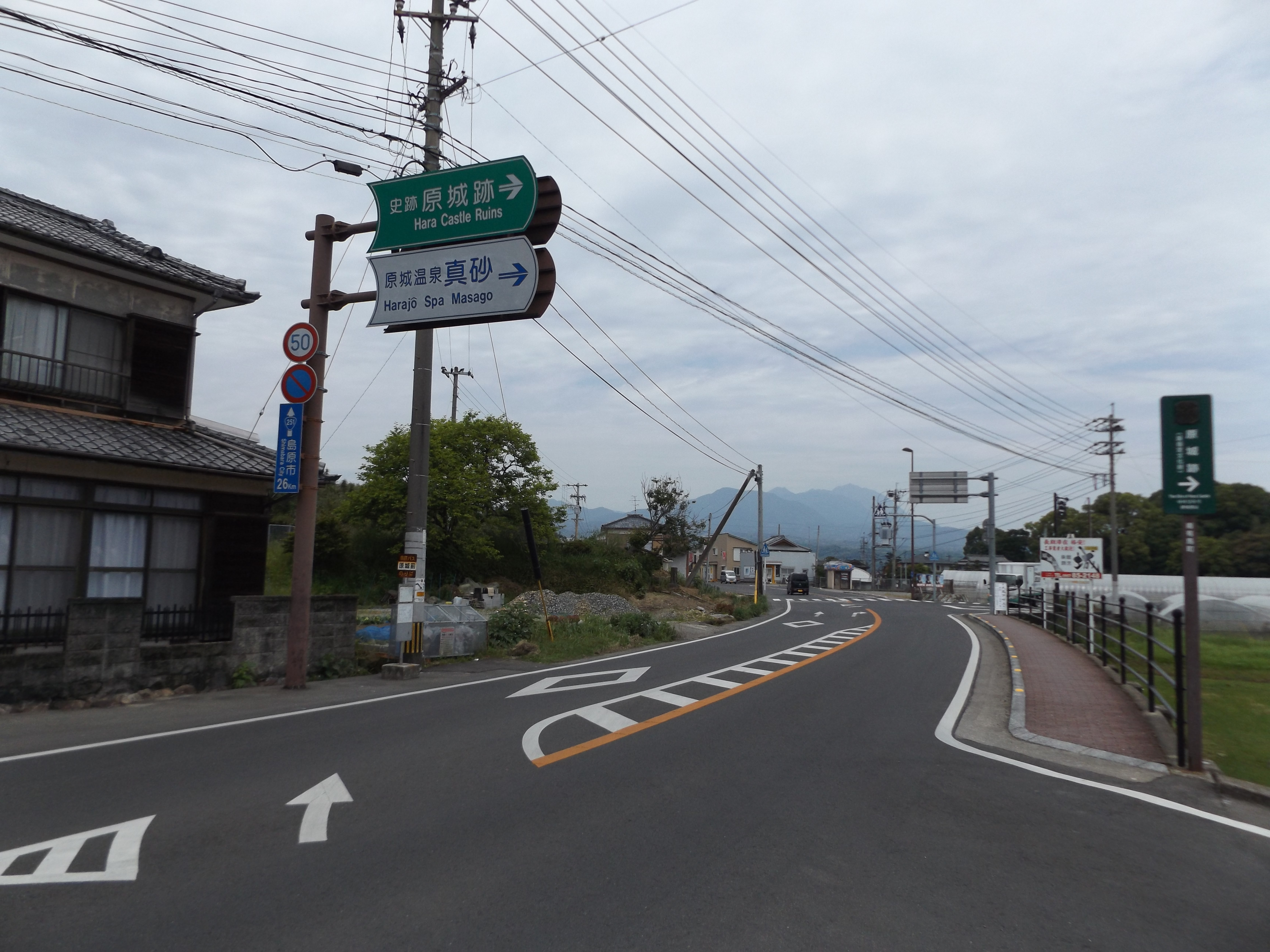

Route information
- Length: 148.2 km (92.1 mi)
- Existed: 10 July 1956–present

Location
- Country: Japan

Highway system
- National highways of Japan; Expressways of Japan
← National Route 250	→ National Route 252

National Route 251 is a national highway of Japan connecting Nagasaki, Nagasaki and Isahaya, Nagasaki in Japan, with a total length of 148.2 km (92.09 mi).
