= Isahaya Station =

Railway station in Isahaya, Nagasaki Prefecture, Japan

Isahaya Station 諫早駅
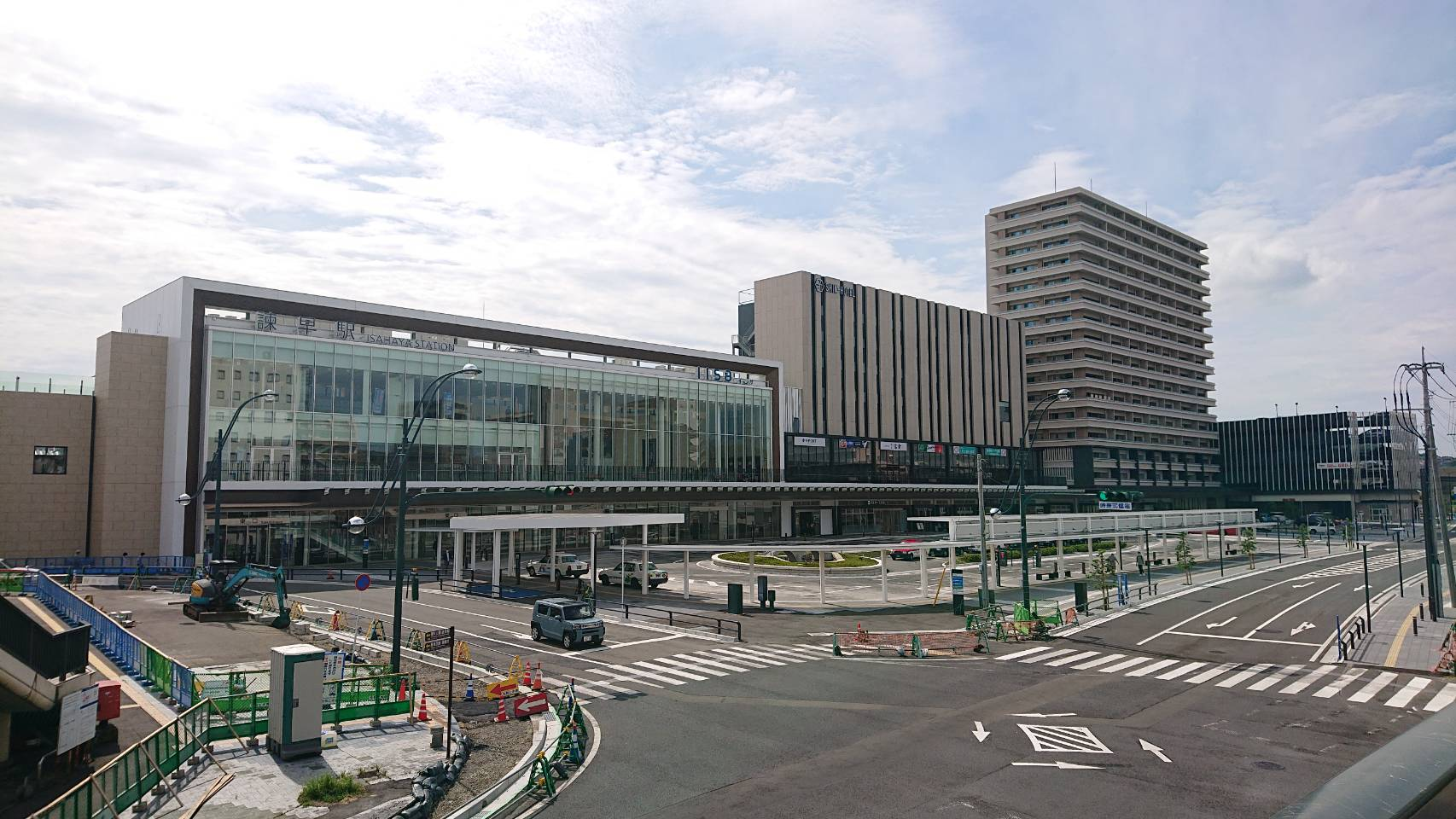
- Station in July 2022

General information
- Location: Eishō-chō; Isahaya, Nagasaki; Japan
- Coordinates: 32°51′7″N 130°2′29″E
- Operator: JR Kyushu; Shimabara Railway
- Distance: Nagasaki Line: 100.4 km (62.4 mi) from Tosu; Nishi Kyushu Shinkansen: 21.2 km (13.2 mi) from Nagasaki; Ōmura Line: 36.2 km (22.5 mi) from Haiki; Shimabara Railway Line: 43.2 km (26.8 mi) from Shimabarakō
- Platforms: 2 side platforms, 1 island platform
- Tracks: 5 + 2 sidings/passing loops
- Connections: Bus terminal

Construction
- Structure type: At grade
- Accessible: Yes, platforms served by elevators

Other information
- Status: JR ticket window (Midori no Madoguchi); Shimabara Railway ticket window
- Website: JR Isahaya; Shimabara Railway

History
- Opened: 27 November 1898; 127 years ago

Passengers
- 3990 daily (JR Kyushu FY2020); 977 daily (Shimabara FY2014)
- Rank: 35th (among JR Kyushu stations)

Services
| Preceding station | JR Kyushu | Following station |
|---|---|---|
| Nagasaki Terminus | Nishi Kyushu Shinkansen Kamome | Shin-Ōmura towards Takeo-Onsen |
| Terminus | Ōmura Line | Iwamatsu towards Haiki |
| Nishi-Isahaya towards Nagasaki | Nagasaki Line | Higashi-Isahaya towards Tosu |
| Preceding station | Shimabara Railway | Following station |
| Terminus | Shimabara Railway Line | Hon-Isahaya towards Shimabarakō |
Location
- Location within Nagasaki Prefecture Location within Japan

Isahaya Station (Japanese: 諫早駅, Hepburn: Isahaya-eki) is a junction passenger railway station located in Eishō-chō, Isahaya, Nagasaki, Japan. It is owned by Kyushu Railway Company (JR Kyushu) and the third-sector Shimabara Railway.

== Lines ==
The station is served by the JR Nagasaki Main Line and is located 100.4 km from the starting point of the line at Tosu. It is also the eastern terminus of the JR Ōmura Line, 36.2 km from the starting point at Haiki and the western terminus and starting point for the 43.2 kilometer third-sector Shimabara Railway Line. to Shimabarakō Besides the local services on the line, the JR Kyushu rapid Seaside Liner service between Sasebo and Nagasaki stops at the station. This station is also served by the Nishi Kyushu Shinkansen.

== Station layout ==
The station consists of three side platforms and two island platforms serving seven tracks. Track/platform 0 is a dead-end siding which juts into the platform 1 (the side platform) and is used exclusively by the trains of the Shimabara Railway Line. Platform 2 is a second side platform serving track 2 while tracks 3 and 4 are served by the island platform. Platform 11 and 12 are for the Nishi Kyushu Shinkansen and they have two side platforms. Since 18 June 2016, Isahaya has operated out of a temporary station building while the construction of a new station building is in progress. The temporary building houses a JR Kyushu ticket counter with a (Midori no Madoguchi) facility as well as a Shimabara Railway ticket window. From the station building there is direct access to platform 0 while access to the other platforms is by means of an underpass which is served by steps and elevators.

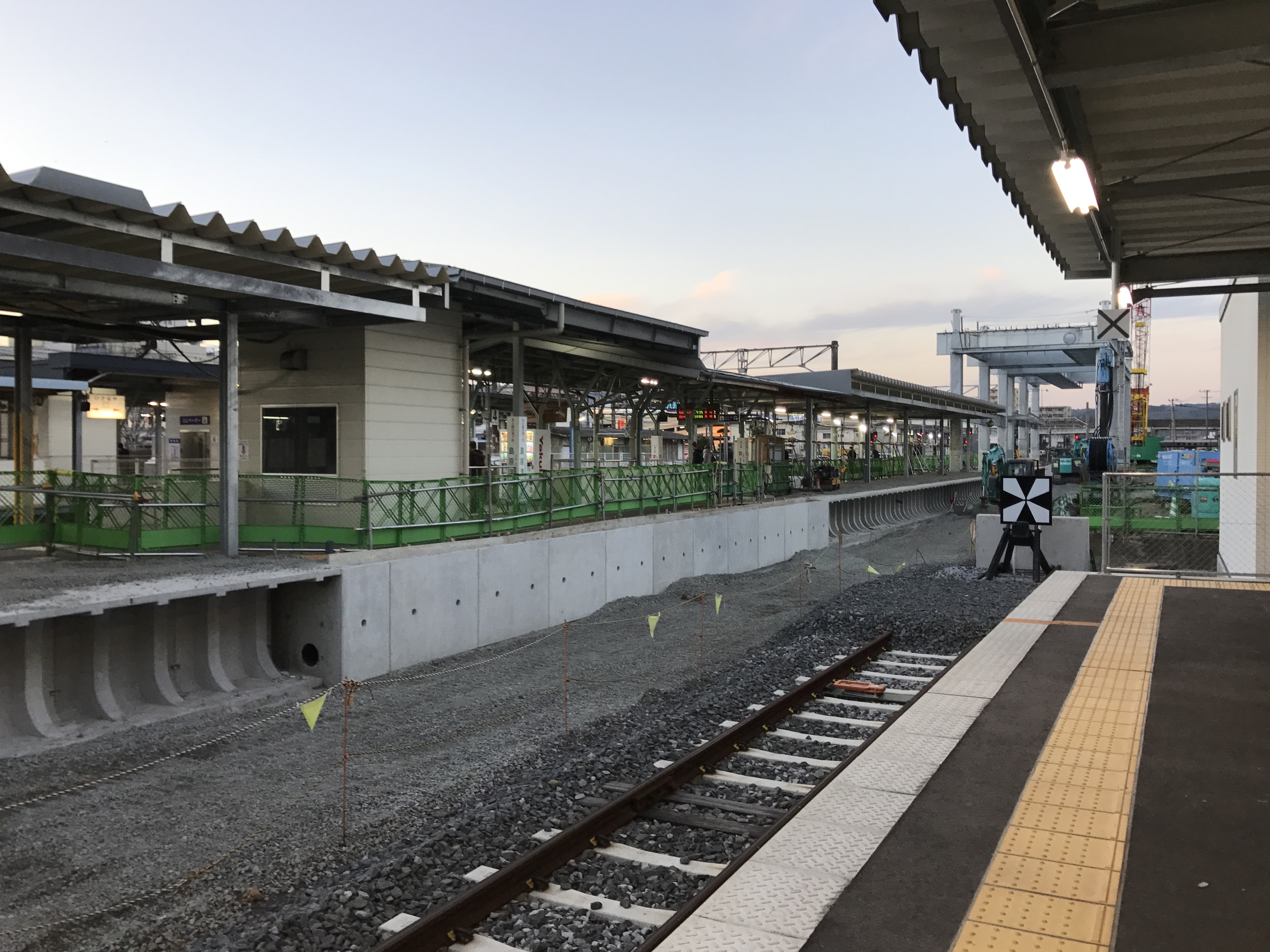
A view of platform 0 used by the Shimabara Railway. Note construction work for the new station building in the background.

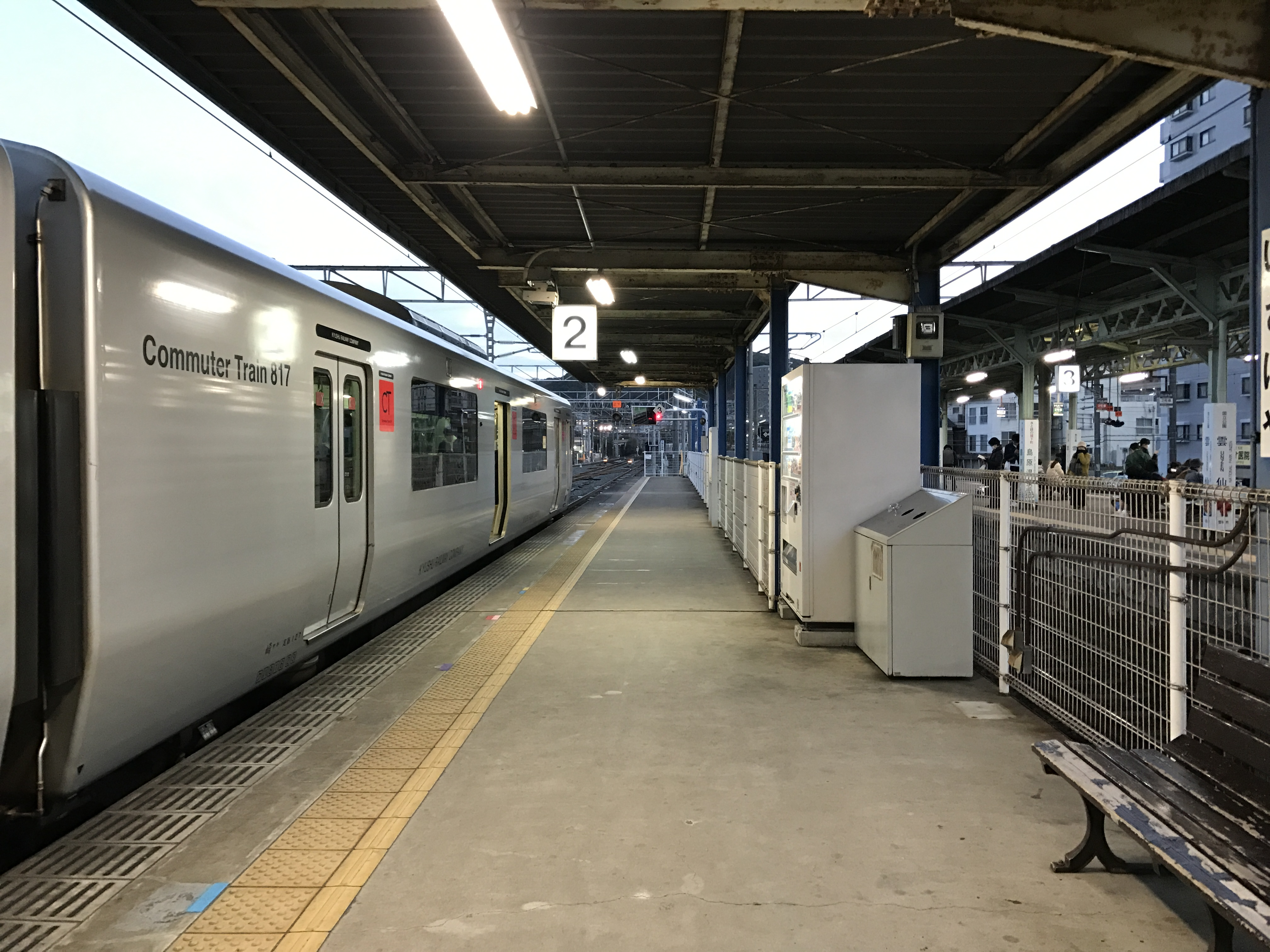
Platform 2 is also a side platform. Note track/platform 3 is on the other side but they are separated by a fence.

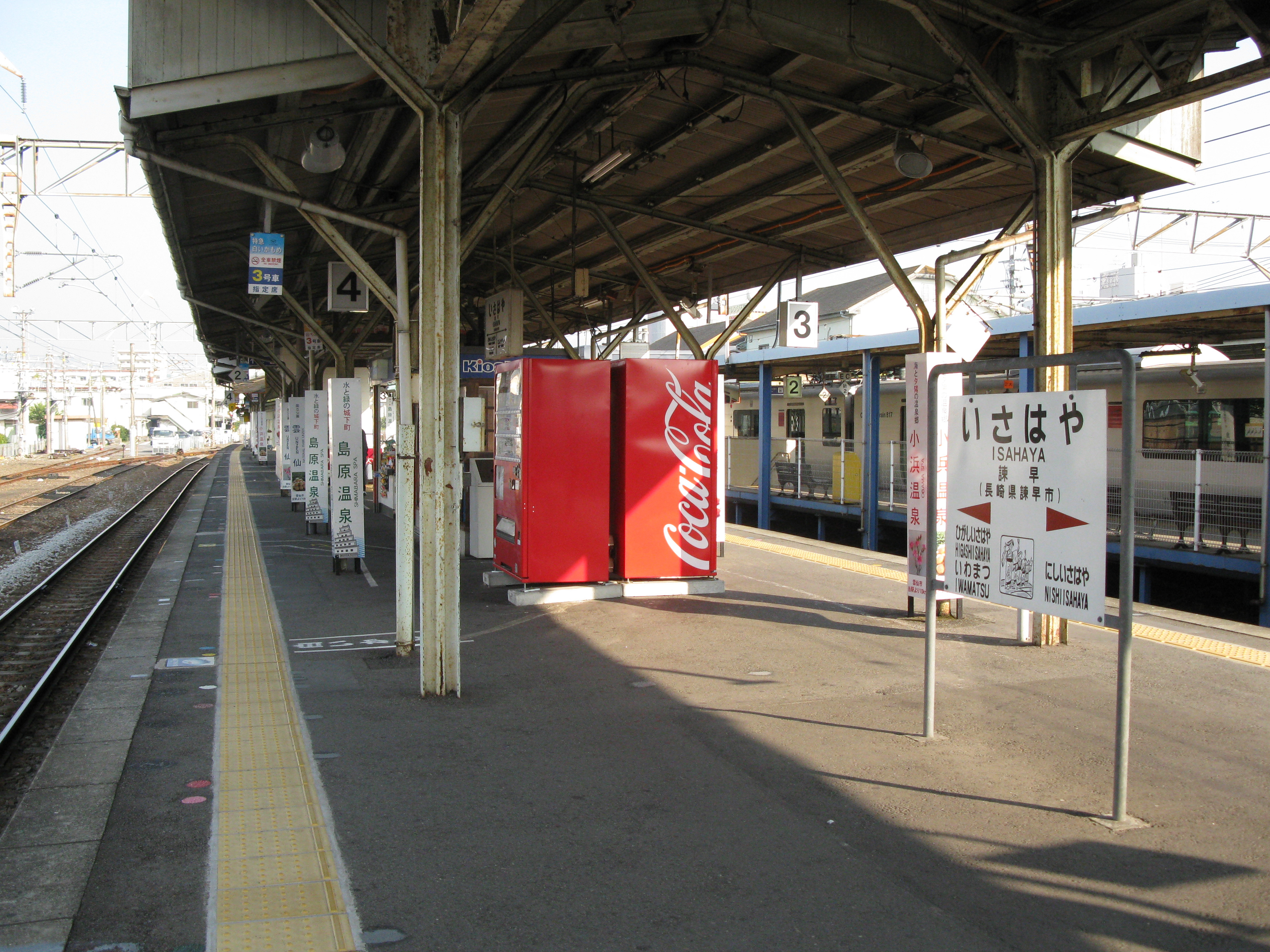
Platforms 3 and 4 are on an island. Note there is a kiosk on the platform. There are sidings to the extreme left.

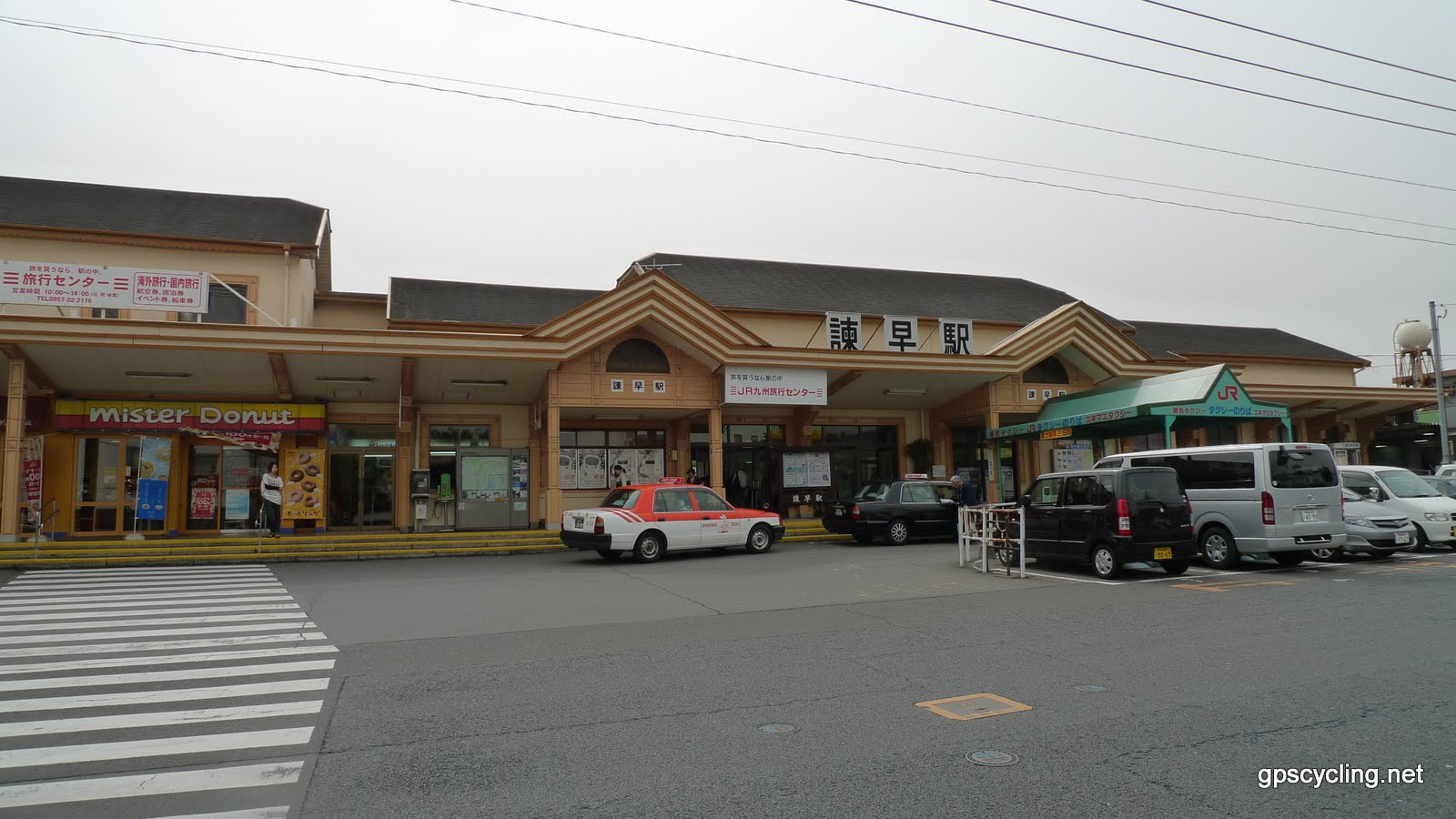
The old station building as seen in 2011.

=== Platforms ===
This station has a side platform for the Shimabara Railway line. The JR Kyushu has 2 island platform serving four tracks. The Nishi Kyushu Shinkansen has 2 side platforms serving two tracks, totaling to 7 tracks at this station.

| 0 | ■Shimabara Railway Line | for Hon-Isahaya, Shimabara, Shimabarakō |
| 1 | ■Rapid Seaside Liner | for Kikitsu, Urakami, and Nagasaki |
| 1 | ■Nagasaki Main Line | for Kikitsu, Ichinuno (Nagayo), Urakami, and Nagasaki |
| 2/3 | ■Nagasaki Main Line | for Ichinuno(Nagayo), Nagasaki, Yue, Kōhoku, and Tosu |
| 2/3 | ■Ōmura Line | for Ōmura, Haiki, Sasebo |
| 4 | ■Express Seaside Liner | for Ōmura, Haiki, and Sasebo |
| 4 | ■Nagasaki Main Line | for Yue, Kōhoku, and Tosu |
| 4 | ■Ōmura Line | for Ōmura, Haiki, and Sasebo |
| 4 | 11 | Nishi Kyushu Shinkansen | for Shin-Omura, Takeo-Onsen |
| 12 | 11 | Nishi Kyushu Shinkansen | for Nagasaki |

== History ==
The private Kyushu Railway, had opened a track from Tosu to Saga by 5 May 1895, and thereafter expanding southwards in phases, as part of the construction of a line to Nagasaki. Separately, a track was laid from Urakami (then known as Nagasaki) north to Nagayo, which opened on 22 July 1897 as the terminus. On 27 November 1898 a link up was achieved with the track from Tosu which had expanded south to Ōmura and Nagayo, allowing through traffic from Tosu to Nagasaki. Isahaya was opened on the same day as an intermediate station on the track between Ōmura and Nagayo.

When the Kyushu Railway was nationalized on 1 July 1907, Japanese Government Railways (JGR) took over control of the station. On 12 October 1909, track from Tosu through Haiki, Ōmura, Isahaya, Nagayo to Nagasaki was designated the Nagasaki Main Line.

On 21 August 1911, the Shimabara Railway Line from Isahaya to Hon-Isahaya was opened.

On 24 March 1934, a track was opened from Isahaya to Yue, known as the Ariake Nishi, as part of the development of an alternative route for the Nagasaki Main Line along the coast of the Ariake Sea. By 1 December 1934, a link up was achieved between the Ariake Nishi Line at Yue and the Ariake Higashi Line which had been extended south from Hizen-Yamaguchi to Tara. The Ariake Nishi and Ariake Higashi Lines were then designated as part of the Nagasaki Main Line. The line from Haiki to Isahaya was separated to become the Ōmura Line.

With the privatization of Japanese National Railways (JNR), the successor of JGR, on 1 April 1987, control of the station passed to JR Kyushu.

In June 2016, work began on the construction of a new station building at Isahaya. The old station building, a timber structure in western style built in 1935, was noted for its role as a receiving station for relief trains carrying the injured from the atomic bomb at Nagasaki. This would be replaced by a new building scheduled to be completed in 2020, in time for the commencement of Shinkansen services to the station.

The Nishi Kyushu Shinkansen opened for service on 23 September 2022.

== Passenger statistics ==
In fiscal 2020, the JR station was used by an average of 3,990 passengers daily (boarding passengers only), and it ranked 39th among the busiest stations of JR Kyushu.

For the Shimabara Railway station, in fiscal 2014, there were a total of 356,467 boarding passengers, given a daily average of 977 passengers.

== Surrounding area ==
- Bus terminal for Nagasaki Kenei Bus and Shimabara Railway Bus
- Nagasaki Prefectural Isahaya Commercial High School
- Chinzei Gakuin University
- Chinzei Gakuin High School
