= Shimabara Railway =

Railway company in Nagasaki, Japan

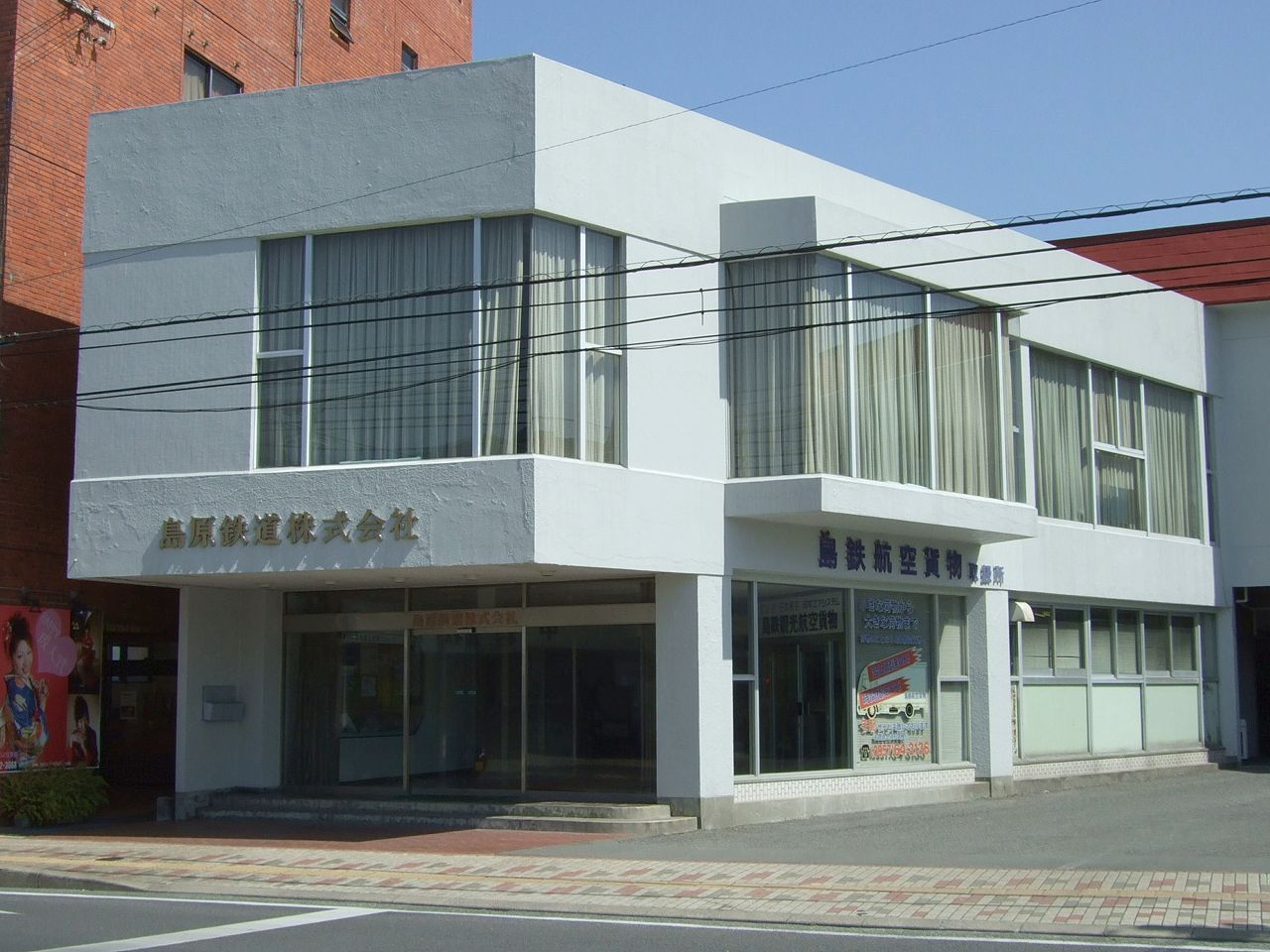
- Shimabara Railway head office
- Native name: 島原鉄道
- Romanized name: Shimabara Tetsudō
- Company type: Third-sector
- Industry: Transportation
- Founded: 5 May 1908; 118 years ago
- Headquarters: Bentenmachi, Shimabara, Nagasaki
- Website: Official website

Shimabara Railway (島原鉄道, Shimabara Tetsudō), known as Shimatetsu (島鉄) for short, is a third-sector railway company in Nagasaki, Japan.

Shimabara Railway also operates buses, taxis and passenger ferries; as well as other non-transport ventures.

Nagasaki Prefecture and Cities in Shimabara area came to hold stocks in the company after an eruption disaster of Unzen Fugen-dake in an effort to increase capital.

== Line ==
- Shimabara Railway Line

== History ==
- May 5, 1908: Shimabara Railway Co., Ltd. established.
- 1911:
  - April 1: Line opened with a JGR Class 150 locomotive (built 1871) from the Ministry of Railways.
  - June 20: Line from Hon-Isahaya to Ainomura (now Aino) opened.
- September 24, 1913: Line from Isahaya to Shimabara Minato (now South Shimabara) opened.
- April 10, 1919: Kuchinotsu Railway Co., Ltd. established.
- April 22, 1922: Kuchinotsu Railway line from Shimabara Minato to Dozaki opened.
- March 1, 1928: Kuchinotsu Railway line from Kazusa to Shimabara Minato opened.
- December 5, 1930: Shimabara Railway bus service established.
- June 1, 1935: Shimabara Railway line to Unzen opened (discontinued 1938).
- 1935: Kuchinotsu Railway bus service established.
- 1938: Kuchinotsu Railway buys Oniike route.
- July 1, 1943: Shimabara and Kuchinotsu Railway companies merge.
- July 1956 Island Tourist Rail Co., Ltd. established.
- March 1966 Island Rail Taxi Co., Ltd. established.
- July 1978 Isahaya Terminal Hotel opened.
- November 1990-June 1991: Eruption of Mount Unzen; service from Fukae to Shimabara discontinued.
- October 1995: Nagasaki and cities and towns along the line increase their stock holdings in the company.
- April 1, 1997: Fukae-Shimabara service resumed after reconstruction work. Tourist tram train operation started.
- August 1997: Shimabara - Omuta route opened; Shimatetsu high speed passenger ship service began.
- April 1, 2008 - Rail service from Shimabara-Gaikō to Kazusa discontinued.

Current (October 2015) capital of 300 million yen.
