= Kyushu Expressway =

Expressway in Kyushu, Japan

Kyushu Expressway
- 九州自動車道

Route information
- Part of AH1
- Length: 346.2 km (215.1 mi)
- Existed: 1971–present

Major junctions
- From: Moji Interchange in Kitakyushu, Fukuoka; Kita-Kyushu Expressway; AH1 Kanmon Bridge
- To: Kagoshima Junction in Kagoshima, Kagoshima; Minami-Kyushu Expressway; Ibusuki Skyline

Location
- Country: Japan
- Major cities: Fukuoka, Dazaifu, Tosu, Kurume, Kumamoto, Yatsushiro, Kirishima

Highway system
- National highways of Japan; Expressways of Japan

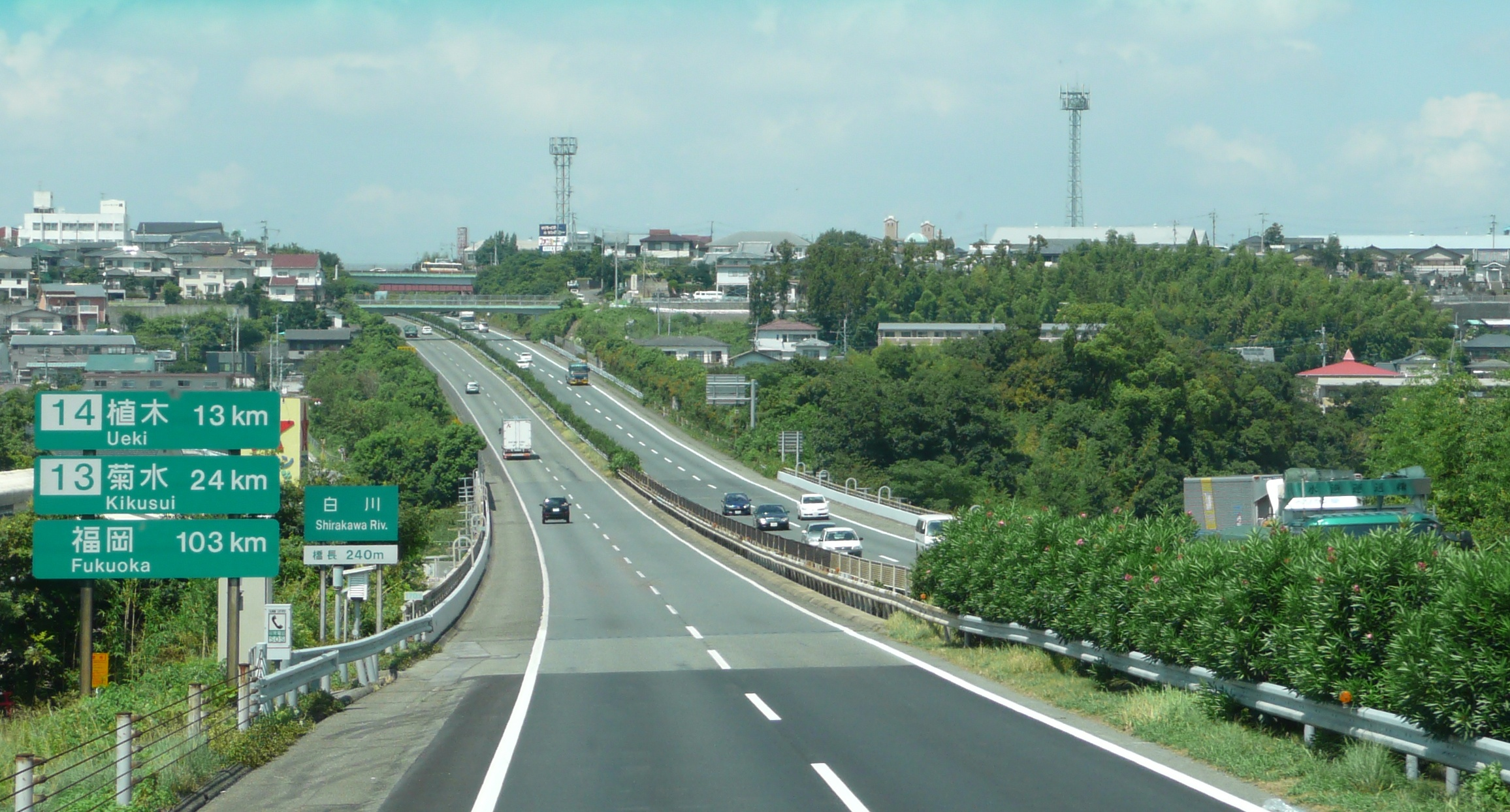
Kumamoto, Japan

Kyushu Expressway (九州自動車道, Kyūshū Jidōsha-dō) (Asian Highway Network AH1) is one of the Expressways of Japan from Kitakyūshū (and the bridge to Honshū) to west of Kagoshima linking with the Higashikyushu Expressway and the Ibusuki Skyline. It runs through the prefectures of Fukuoka, the eastern half of the Saga, Kumamoto, Miyazaki (Ebino only) and the Kagoshima prefectures. The freeway runs entirely on the island of Kyūshū. The total length is 346.2 km. It does not cover Ōita or Nagasaki.

== History ==
- June 30, 1971, a section from Ueki to Kumamoto was opened to traffic
- October 21, 1972, a section from Nankan to Ueki opened to traffic
- November 16, 1973, Tosu Interchange and Junction to Nankan was opened to traffic
- December 13, 1973, Kajiki Interchange to Satsuma-Yoshida was opened to traffic
- March 13, 1975, Koga Interchange to Tosu Junction was opened to traffic
- March 4, 1976, Ebuno Junction with the Miyazaki Expressway to Ebuno Interchange was opened.
- November 26, 1976, The section was opened to traffic from Kumatoto to Mifune Interchanges
- November 29, 1976, a section from Mizobe Kagoshimna Airport to Kajiki Interchanges was opened
- July 21, 1977, a section from Wakamiya to Koga was open to traffic
- November 15, 1977, a section from Satsuma-Yoshida to Kagoshima-Kita Interchanges was opened
- December 15, 1978, a section from Mifune to Matsubase Interchanges was opened
- March 8, 1979, a section from Wakamiya to Yahata Interchanges was opened
- March 12, 1980, a section from Matsubase to Yatsushiro Interchanges was opened
- March 22, 1980 a section from Kurino to Mizobe-Kagoshima Airport was opened
- October 1, 1981, a section from Ebuno Junction to Kurino Interchange opened made that section ran from Ebuno to Kagoshima-Kita interchanges that time
- March 27, 1984, a section from Moji to Kokura-Higashi was opened which made access to the bridge with Honshū
- March 28, 1985, the Tosu Junction in the west was opened.
- February 5, 1987, the Tosu Junction in the east was opened.
- March 29, 1988, a section from Kagoshima-Kita to Kagoshima was opened with an interchange with the expressway.
- March 31, 1988, a section from Kokura-Higashi to Yahata was opened to traffic
- October 19, 1988, a section in the Kagoshima Interchange with the Minami Kyushu Expressway was opened
- December 7, 1989, a section from Yatsushiro to Hitoyoshi was opened to traffic
- March 25, 1992, a section in the Kajiki Interchange with the road was opened
- March 31, 1993, the Shin-Moji Interchange was opened
- July 27, 1995, a section from Hitoyoshi to Ebuno was opened to traffic which made the Kyushu Expressway from Moji to Kagoshima fully accessible with no gaps.
- April 20, 1998, the Yatsushiro Junction was opened to traffic with another freeway
- December 19, 2001, Kajiki Junction was opened to traffic
- December 12, 2004, the tunnel from Hitoyoshi to Ebino Interchanges which made Kyushu Expressway with four lanes now being connected with no gaps
- February 26, 2006, Kitakyushu Junction was opened to traffic with another freeway
- March 29, 2009, the Miyama-Yanagawa Interchange was opened
- February 19, 2011, the Kurate Interchange was opened
- April 14, 2016, Many sections of the expressway were damaged during the 2016 Kumamoto earthquakes.
- April 29, 2016, The expressway reopened.

== List of interchanges and features ==
- IC - interchange, SIC - smart interchange, JCT - junction, SA - service area, PA - parking area, BS - bus stop, TN - tunnel, TB - toll gate, BR - bridge
- Bus stops labeled "○" are currently in use; those marked "◆" are closed.

Number	Name	Connections	Distance from Moji(Km)	Bus Stop	Notes	Location	
Through to Kanmon Bridge
1	Moji IC	Kitakyushu Expressway 4 Pref. Route 72 (Kurokawa Shiranoe Higashihonmachi Route)	0.0			Moji-ku, Kitakyūshū	Fukuoka
-	Hata BS	-	4.1	◆		Moji-ku, Kitakyūshū	Fukuoka
1-1	Shin-Moji Interchange	Pref. Route 71 (Shin-Moji Port Dairi Route)	4.4		Only accessible for Fukuoka	Moji-ku, Kitakyūshū	Fukuoka
-	Kishi PA	-	6.2			Moji-ku, Kitakyūshū	Fukuoka
-	Kuzuhara BS	-	11.2	◆		Kokuraminami-ku, Kitakyūshū	Fukuoka
2	Kokura-Higashi IC	Kitakyushu Expressway 1 National Route 10 (Sone Bypass)	13.4			Kokuraminami-ku, Kitakyūshū	Fukuoka
2-1	Kitakyushu JCT	Higashikyushu Expressway	16.5			Kokuraminami-ku, Kitakyūshū	Fukuoka
3	Kokura-Minami IC	National Route 322	20.2	○		Kokuraminami-ku, Kitakyūshū	Fukuoka
4	Yahata IC	Kitakyushu Expressway 4 National Route 200 (Nogata Bypass)	31.4	○	Kitakyushu Expressway←→Hiroshima: no access	Yahatanishi-ku, Kitakyūshū	Fukuoka
-	Nogata PA	-	34.9	○	Only accessible for Hiroshima	Nogata	Fukuoka
4-1	Kurate IC	Pref. Route 472 (Nogata Kurate Route)	36.1			Kurate	Fukuoka
-	Kurate PA	-	36.3		Only accessible for Fukuoka	Kurate	Fukuoka
4-2	Miyata SIC	Pref. Route 9 (Muroki Shimoariki Wakamiya Route) via Miyawaka city road	42.1		Only accessible for Fukuoka	Miyawaka	Fukuoka
5	Wakamiya IC	Pref. Route 9 (Muroki Shimoariki Wakamiya Route)	45.2	○		Miyawaka	Fukuoka
-	Koga SA	-	54.5			Koga	Fukuoka
6	Koga IC	National Route 3 (Kashii Bypass); Pref. Route 35 (Chikushino Koga Route)	57.7			Koga	Fukuoka
-	Aoyagi BS	-	58.7	○		Koga	Fukuoka
-	Tachibanayama BS	-	62.9	○		Shingu	Fukuoka
-	Tachibanayama BS	-	62.9	○		Hisayama	Fukuoka
7	Fukuoka IC	Fukuoka Expressway 4 National Route 201	68.3	◆		Higashi-ku, Fukuoka	Fukuoka
7-1	Sue PA/SIC	Pref. Route 91 (Shime Sue Route)	73.4	◆		Sue	Fukuoka
-	Umi BS	-	75.4	○		Umi	Fukuoka
8	Dazaifu IC	Fukuoka Expressway 2 National Route 3 (Fukuoka-Minami Bypass)	80.1	◆		Dazaifu	Fukuoka
-	Chikushino BS	-	84.9	○		Chikushino	Fukuoka
8-1	Chikushino IC	Pref. Route 7 (Chikushino Interchange Route)	86.9			Chikushino	Fukuoka
-	Kiyama PA	-	90.8	○		Kiyama	Saga
9	Tosu JCT/IC	Nagasaki Expressway; Ōita Expressway; National Route 3 / National Route 34	96.1			Tosu	Saga
-	Ajisaka SIC				Planned	Ogōri	Fukuoka
-	Miyanojin BS	-	102.5	○		Kurume	Fukuoka
10	Kurume IC	National Route 3 (Tosu Kurume Road); National Route 322	105.4	○		Kurume	Fukuoka
10-1	Hirokawa IC	Pref. Route 84 (Hirokawa Jōyō Route)	113.2	○	Bus stop: northbound only	Hirokawa	Fukuoka
-	Hirokawa SA	-	113.6	○	Bus stop: southbound only Hirokawa IC←→SA: no access	Hirokawa	Fukuoka
11	Yame IC	National Route 442 (Yame Chikugo Bypass)	118.4	○		Yame	Fukuoka
11	Yame IC	National Route 442 (Yame Chikugo Bypass)	118.4	○		Chikugo	Fukuoka
-	Setaka BS	-	122.4	○		Miyama	Fukuoka
11-1	Miyama-Yanagawa IC	Pref. Route 775 (Motoyoshi Ogawa Route)	125.6			Miyama	Fukuoka
-	Yamakawa PA	-	128.0	○		Miyama	Fukuoka
12	Nankan IC	Pref. Route 5 (Omuta Nankan Route); Pref. Route 10 (Nankan Omuta-Kita Route)	135.0			Nankan	Kumamoto
-	Kobaru BS	-	138.8	○		Nankan	Kumamoto
-	Tamana PA	-	142.7			Nankan	Kumamoto
13	Kikusui IC	Pref. Route 16 (Tamana Yamaga Route)	146.6	○		Nagomi	Kumamoto
-	Kaou BS	-	153.6	○		Yamaga	Kumamoto
14	Ueki IC	National Route 3	157.3	○		Kita-ku, Kumamoto	Kumamoto
14-1	Kita-Kumamoto SIC	Pref. Route 30 (Ozu Ueki Route) via Kumamoto city road	162.0			Kita-ku, Kumamoto	Kumamoto
-	Kita-Kumamoto SA	-	162.2			Kita-ku, Kumamoto	Kumamoto
-	Nishi-Kōshi BS	-	165.7	○		Kōshi	Kumamoto
-	Musashigaoka BS	-	169.0	○		Kita-ku, Kumamoto	Kumamoto
15	Kumamoto IC	National Route 57 (Kumamoto-Higashi Bypass)	171.2			Higashi-ku, Kumamoto	Kumamoto
-	Takuma PA	-	174.3			Higashi-ku, Kumamoto	Kumamoto
15-1	Mashiki-Kumamoto Airport IC	Pref. Route 36 (Kumamoto Mashiki Ozu Route)	176.4			Mashiki	Kumamoto
-	Mashiki BS	-	177.5	○		Mashiki	Kumamoto
15-2	Kashima JCT	Kyushu Chūō Expressway	180.7			Mifune	Kumamoto
16	Mifune IC	National Route 445	183.1	◆		Mifune	Kumamoto
-	Midorikawa PA	-	186.7			Minami-ku, Kumamoto	Kumamoto
-	Midorikawa PA	-	186.7			Kōsa	Kumamoto
16-1	Jōnan BS/ SIC	Pref. Route 38 (Uto Kōsa Route)	189.0	○		Minami-ku, Kumamoto	Kumamoto
17	Matsubase IC	National Route 218	195.1	◆		Uki	Kumamoto
17-1	Hikawa Takatsuka BS/Uki Hikawa SIC	National Route 3 via Hikawa town road	204.0	◆		Hikawa	Kumamoto
-	Miyahara SA	-	208.8	○		Hikawa	Kumamoto
18	Yatsushiro IC	National Route 3	213.5	○		Yatsushiro	Kumamoto
18-1	Yatsushiro JCT	Minamikyushu Expressway	214.6		Only accessible for Fukuoka	Yatsushiro	Kumamoto
-	Sakamoto PA	-	222.1	◆		Yatsushiro	Kumamoto
-	Ayugaeri BS	-	230.2	◆		Yatsushiro	Kumamoto
-	Higo TN	-			Length 6,340m Dangerous goods forbidden	Yatsushiro	Kumamoto
-	Higo TN	-			Length 6,340m Dangerous goods forbidden	Yamae	Kumamoto
-	Koduru BS	-	242.4	◆		Yamae	Kumamoto
-	Yamae SA	-	248.0	◆		Yamae	Kumamoto
19	Hitoyoshi IC	Pref. Route 54 (Hitoyoshi Interchange Route)	252.0	○		Yamae	Kumamoto
19	Hitoyoshi IC	Pref. Route 54 (Hitoyoshi Interchange Route)	252.0	○		Hitoyoshi	Kumamoto
-	Hitoyoshi TB	-	252.1		Abandoned on July 27, 1995	Hitoyoshi	Kumamoto
19-1	Hitoyoshi-Kuma SIC	National Route 219	256.2	-	incl. Hitoyoshi-Minami Bus Stop; BS location TBD	Hitoyoshi	Kumamoto
-	Hitoyoshi Temporary Interchange	National Route 219	256.2		Abandoned on July 27, 1995	Hitoyoshi	Kumamoto
-	Hitoyoshi-Minami BS	-	256.4	◆	closed by replacement	Hitoyoshi	Kumamoto
-	Kakutō TN	-			Length 6,264m Dangerous goods forbidden	Hitoyoshi	Kumamoto
-	Kakutō TN	-			Length 6,264m Dangerous goods forbidden	Ebino	Miyazaki
-	Ebino PA	-	271.9			Ebino	Miyazaki
20	Ebino IC	National Route 268	274.3	○		Ebino	Miyazaki
21	Ebino JCT	Miyazaki Expressway	276.4			Ebino	Miyazaki
-	Yoshimatsu PA	-	281.6	○		Yūsui	Kagoshima
22	Kurino IC	Pref. Route 55 (Kurino Kajiki Route)	290.0			Yūsui	Kagoshima
23	Yokogawa IC	Pref. Route 55 (Kurino Kajiki Route)	296.0			Kirishima	Kagoshima
-	Mizobe PA	-	302.7			Kirishima	Kagoshima
-	Kagoshima Airport-Minami BS	-	308.6	○		Kirishima	Kagoshima
24	Mizobe-Kagoshima Airport IC	National Route 504	309.8			Kirishima	Kagoshima
25-1 25	Kajiki JCT; Kajiki IC	Higashikyushu Expressway; National Route 10 (Kajiki Bypass); Pref. Route 55 (Kurino Kajiki Route)	317.5			Aira	Kagoshima
-	Chōsa BS	-	322.2	○		Aira	Kagoshima
25-2	Sakurajima SA/SIC		323.6		SIC:Only accessible for Kagoshima	Aira	Kagoshima
26	Aira IC	Pref. Route 57 (Fumoto Shigetomi Teishajō Route)	326.2			Aira	Kagoshima
-	Honjō BS	-	330.6	◆		Kagoshima	Kagoshima
27	Satsuma-Yoshida IC	Pref. Route 16 (Kagoshima Yoshida Route)	334.8			Kagoshima	Kagoshima
-	Kagoshima TB	-	336.7		Toll Barrier	Kagoshima	Kagoshima
28	Kagoshima-Kita IC	National Route 3 Pref. Route 18 (Kagoshima-Kita Interchange Route)	341.9			Kagoshima	Kagoshima
-	Ishiki BS	-	342.0	○		Kagoshima	Kagoshima
29	Kagoshima IC	Minamikyushu Expressway; National Route 3 (Kagoshima Bypass)	346.2			Kagoshima	Kagoshima
Through to Ibusuki Skyline

- The section between Yatsushiro Junction and Ebino Interchange consists of tunnels that run in the mountainous areas; vehicles carrying dangerous goods are forbidden from travelling through these tunnels and must use alternate routes.

== Lanes ==
- 6-lane, Dazaifu to Kurume Interchanges
- 4-lane, Moji to Dazaifu Interchange and from Kurume to Kagoshima Interchanges
