= Kiyama Parking Area =

Rest area in Saga and Fukuoka prefectures, Japan

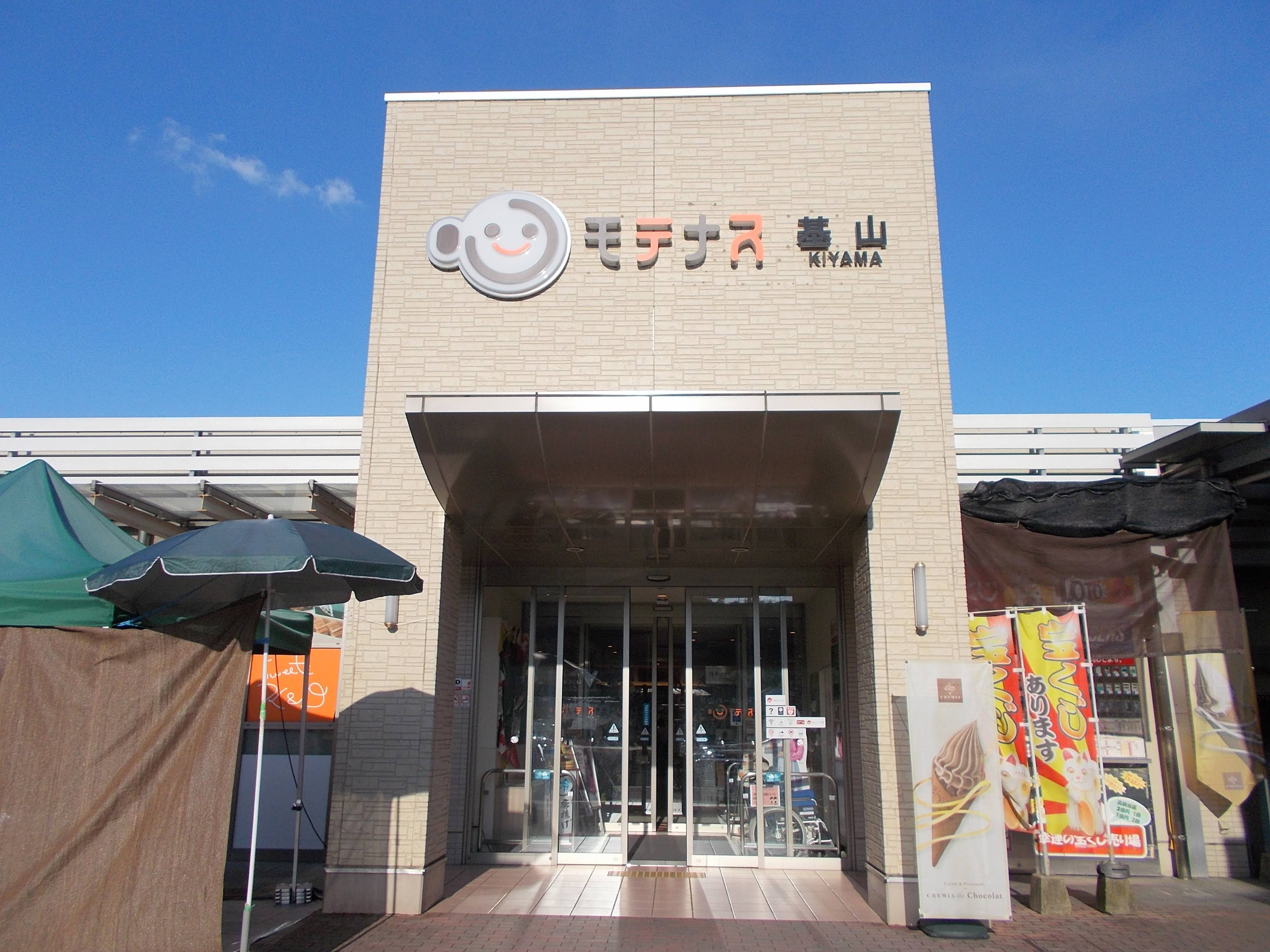

Information
- Native name: 基山パーキングエリア
- Road: Kyushu Expressway
- Location: 1318 Haruda, Chikushino, Fukuoka, Japan (southbound); 2097-1 Kokura, Kiyama, Miyaki District, Saga, Japan (northbound)
- Coordinates: 33°26′29.9″N 130°31′53.34″E
- Date opened: 1975

The Kiyama Parking Area (基山パーキングエリア) is a rest area of the Kyushu Expressway between Chikushino, Fukuoka and Kiyama, Saga, Japan, with an expressway bus stop.

== History ==
The Parking Area opened on March 13, 1975.

== Bus stop ==
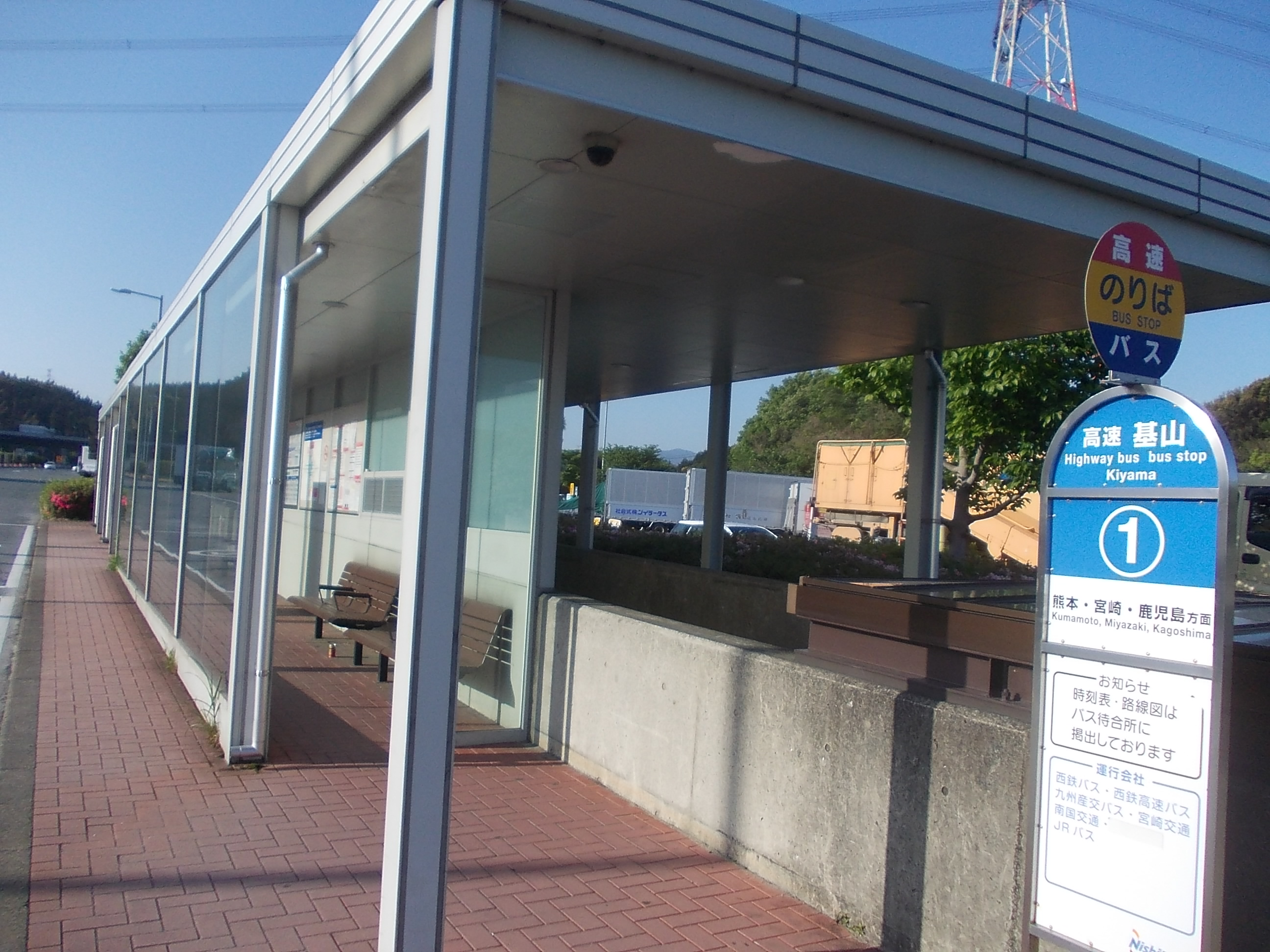
Kiyama Bus Stop on the southbound line

Kiyama Bus Stop (基山バスストップ, Kiyama basu suttopu) is a bus stop, located in the Kiyama Parking Area, managed by West Nippon Expressway Company.

== Outline ==
The bus stop has two platforms, one in each direction. The southbound platform branches off in different directions.

From July 1, 2007, most highway bus services within Kyushu stop here where riders can transfer to destinations across Kyushu.

== Bus services ==
For bus timetable, see

- Expressway bus

=== Southbound directions ===
Nickname	Destination	Major stops	Operation
Fukuoka Airport-Kurume Line	JR Kurume Station	Nishitetsu Kurume Station	Nishi-Nippon Railroad
Fukuoka Airport-Arao Line	Greenland	Yame IC, Nishitetsu Yanagawa Station, Ōmuta Station, Arao Station	Nishitetsu Bus Ōmuta
Wakakusu	Saga Second Government Building	Kanzaki Bus Stop, Saga Station Bus Center	Nishi-Nippon Railroad
Fukuoka Airport-Saga Line	Saga Second Government Building	Kanzaki Bus Stop, Yoshinogari site, Saga Station Bus Center	Nishi-Nippon Railroad
Kyushu	Nagasaki Station	Ureshino IC, Ureshino Bus Terminal, Ōmura IC, Isahaya IC, Showamachi	Kyushu Kyuko Bus
Dejima	Nagasaki Station	Kanzaki Bus Stop, Ōmura IC, Isahaya IC, Bypass Tarami, Showamachi, Hamaguchimachi	Nagasaki Prefecture Transportation Bureau
Sasebo	Saza Bus Center	Hasami-Arita IC, Sasebo Bus Center, Matsuurachō	Nishi-Nippon Railroad Saihi Motor
Fukuoka-Huis Ten Bosch Line	Huis Ten Bosch	direct	Nishi-Nippon Railroad Saihi Motor
Shimabara	Shimatetsu Bus Terminal	Isahaya Station, Hon-Isahaya Station, Aino Station, Tairamachi Station, Shimabara Station	Nishi-Nippon Railroad Shimabara Railway
Hinokuni	Kumamoto Kotsu Center	Yame IC, Nishikōshi Bus Stop, Musashigaoka Bus Stop, Kumamoto Prefectural Office	Nishi-Nippon Railroad Kyushu Sanko Bus
Aso Express	Uchinomaki Onsen	Aso Cuddly Dominion, Aso Station	Nishi-Nippon Railroad Kyushu Sanko Bus
Fukuoka-Kurokawa Line	Kurokawa Onsen	Tsuetate Onsen, Michinoeki Yu Station Oguni, Minamioguni Town Hall	Kyushu Sanko Bus Hita Bus
Hita	Hita Bus Head Office	Tachiarai Bus Stop, Amagi IC, Jōnai-Mameda Iriguchi, Hita Bus Center	Nishi-Nippon Railroad Hita Bus
Yufuin	Yufuin Station	Amagase-Takatsuka Bus Stop, Kusu IC, Kokonoe IC	Nishi-Nippon Railroad Hita Bus Kamenoi Bus
Toyonokuni	Oita Shinkawa; Beppu Kitahama Bus Center	Shiizako, Ōita Station; Beppuwan Service Area/Ritsumeikan Asia Pacific University, Kannawa Onsen	Nishi-Nippon Railroad Oita Kotsu Oita Bus Kamenoi Bus
Gokase	Nobeoka Station	Yamato, Gokase Town Hall, Takachiho Bus Center	Nishi-Nippon Railroad Miyazaki Kotsu
Tokubetsu Bin (Note: Services normally operate on weekends, and additional days, such as school holidays.)	Miyakō City Bus Center	Nobeoka Station, Hyūga IC, Sadowara Station, Miyazaki Station	Nishi-Nippon Railroad Miyazaki Kotsu
Phoenix	Miyazaki Station	Hitoyoshi IC, Kobayashi IC, Miyakonojō Kita Bus Stop, Miyakō City Bus Center, Tachibana-dōri 1 Chome, Carino Miyazaki-mae	Nishi-Nippon Railroad Kyushu Sanko Bus Miyazaki Kotsu JR Kyushu Bus
Sakurajima	Kagoshima Port High-speed craft Terminal	Kagoshima Airport, Chōsa Bus Stop, Kagoshima-Chūō Station, Tenmonkan	Nishi-Nippon Railroad Nangoku Kotsu Kagoshima Kotsu Kagoshima Kotsu Kanko Bus JR Kyushu Bus

=== Northbound directions ===
Nickname	Destination	Major stops	Operation
Fukuoka Airport-Kurume Line	Fukuoka Airport	Chikushino Bus Stop	Nishi-Nippon Railroad
Fukuoka Airport-Arao Line	Fukuoka Airport	Chikushino Bus Stop	Nishitetsu Bus Ōmuta
Wakakusu	Tenjin Highway Bus Terminal	direct	Nishi-Nippon Railroad
Fukuoka Airport-Saga Line	Fukuoka Airport	Chikushino Bus Stop	Nishi-Nippon Railroad
Dejima	Sunatsu	Umi Bus Stop, Wakamiya Bus Stop, Nōgata Bus Stop, Hikinoguchi, Mihagino, Kokura Station	Nagasaki Prefecture Transportation Bureau
Shimabara	Hakata Bus Terminal	Chikushino Bus Stop, Tenjin Highway Bus Terminal	Nishi-Nippon Railroad Shimabara Railway
Hinokuni	Tenjin Highway Bus Terminal	Chikushino Bus Stop, Fukuoka Airport, Hakata Bus Terminal	Nishi-Nippon Railroad Kyushu Sanko Bus
Hita	Tenjin Highway Bus Terminal	Chikushino Bus Stop, Fukuoka Airport, Hakata Bus Terminal	Nishi-Nippon Railroad Hita Bus
