= Araho Shrine =

Shrine in Kiyama, Saga

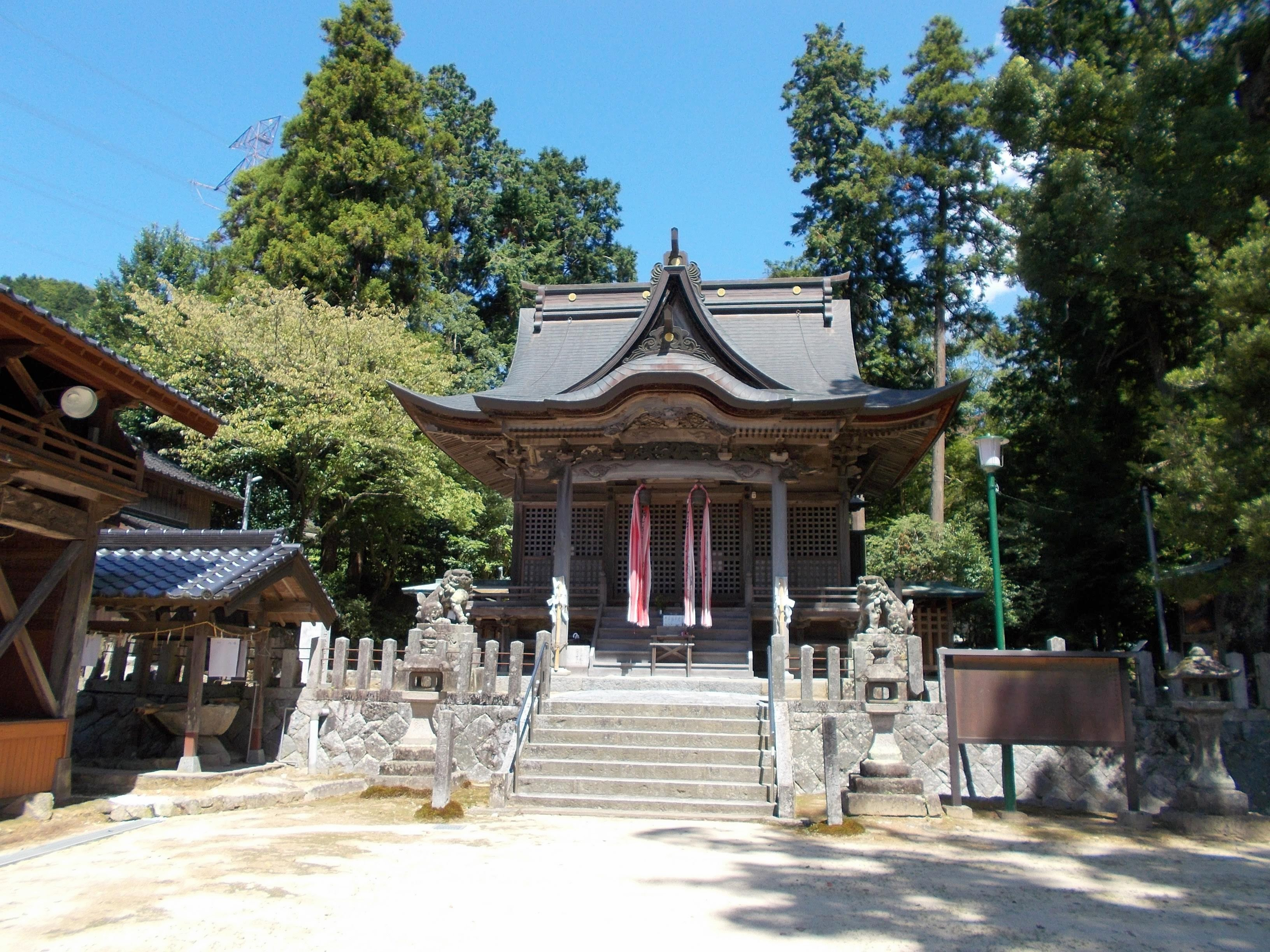
- Araho Shrine worship hall

- Location within Japan

Religion
- Affiliation: Shinto

Location
- Location: 2050, Miyaura, Kiyama; Miyaki District; Saga Prefecture 841-0204
- Interactive map of Araho Shrine
- Coordinates: 33°26′1.9″N 130°30′34.4″E

Architecture
- Founder: Emperor Kōtoku
- Established: Unknown

Araho Shrine (荒穂神社, Araho Jinja) is a Shinto shrine located in Kiyama, Saga Prefecture, Japan.

== History ==
The temple is said to have been built in the 7th century CE, during the reign of Emperor Kōtoku.

The shrine stands on the southern foot of Mount Kizan, which is the site of Kii Castle, a nationally designated historic site. Records from The Three Major Records of Japan (日本三大実録, Nihon Sandai Jitsuroku) of 860 mention that Araho was among a select number of shrines which had been granted a degree of the fifth highest rank. In the Engishiki, a document about royal ceremony in the Heian Period, this shrine is counted as one of the four National shrines of the Third (lowest) Rank (国幣小社, Kokuhei Chūsha) in the Hizen Province.

== Gallery ==
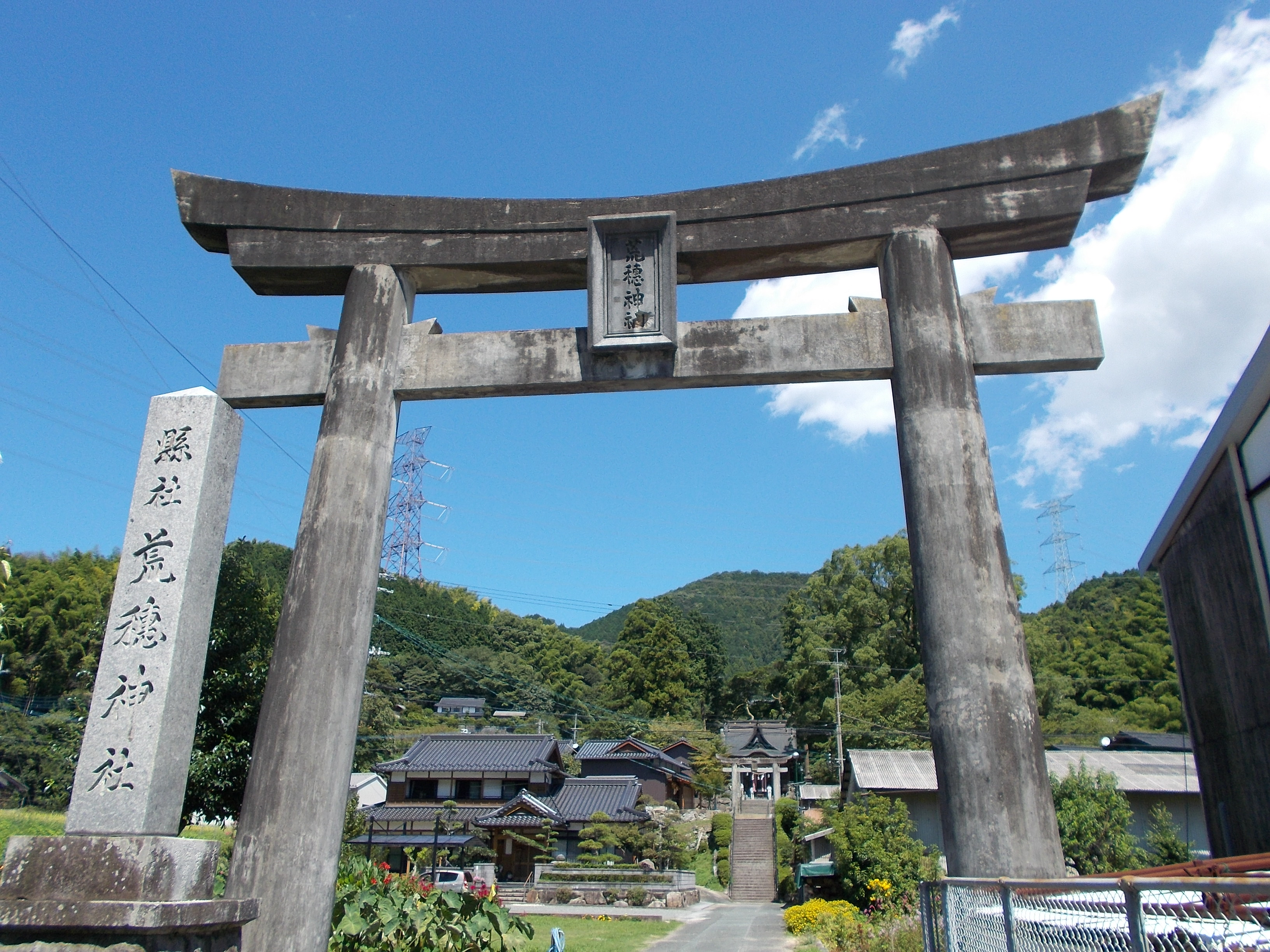
Torii at Araho Shrine entrance.

== See also ==
- Kii Castle
