= Taisho Station =

Taishō Station (大正駅, Taishō-eki) may refer to:

- Taishō Station (Osaka), either of two train stations in Taishō-ku, Osaka, Japan: one on the West Japan Railway Company (JR West) Osaka Loop Line and the other on the Osaka Municipal Subway Nagahori Tsurumi-ryokuchi Line
- Taishō Station (Nagasaki), a train station on the Shimabara Railway in Unzen, Nagasaki Prefecture, Japan
- Tosa-Taishō Station, a train station on the Shikoku Railway (JR Shikoku) Yodo Line in Shimanto, Kochi Prefecture, Japan
