= E3A =

E3A may refer to:

- Y-DNA haplogroup E3a
- Ubiquitin protein ligase E3A
- Boeing E-3 Sentry, an American military aircraft
- Minamikyushu Expressway, route E3A in Japan.
