= Aino Station =

Aino Station is the name of three train stations in Japan:

- Aino Station (Hyōgo) (相野駅) in Hyōgo Prefecture
- Aino Station (Nagasaki) (愛野駅) in Nagasaki Prefecture
- Aino Station (Shizuoka) (愛野駅) in Shizuoka Prefecture
