= Taishō (disambiguation) =

Taishō or Taisho may refer to:

- Emperor Taishō of Japan (1879–1926), reigned 1912–1926
- Taishō era (大正時代), a period in the history of Japan
- Taishō-ku, Osaka, a ward in the city of Osaka, Japan
- Taishō Station, one of three railway stations in Japan:
  - Taishō Station (Osaka), jointly operated by JR West and Osaka Metro
  - Taishō Station (Nagasaki), operated by Shimabara Railway
  - Tosa-Taishō Station in Kōchi Prefecture, operated by JR Shikoku
- Taisho Pharmaceutical, a pharmaceutical company
- Taisho (solar term) (大暑), solar term in East Asia
- Taishō, the Japanese word for the military rank of general officer (大将)
- Taishō, Kōchi, a former town in Kōchi Prefecture
- Taisho University, a private university in Toshima, Tokyo
- Taishō Tripiṭaka, a definitive edition of the Chinese Buddhist canon and its Japanese commentaries

== See also ==
- Daishō (大小), paired Japanese swords of usually a katana and wakizashi
- Taishou, China's commaderial office
