= Daikōzen-ji (Saga) =

Tendai Buddhist temple in Japan

Coordinates: 33°25′45″N 130°29′46″E

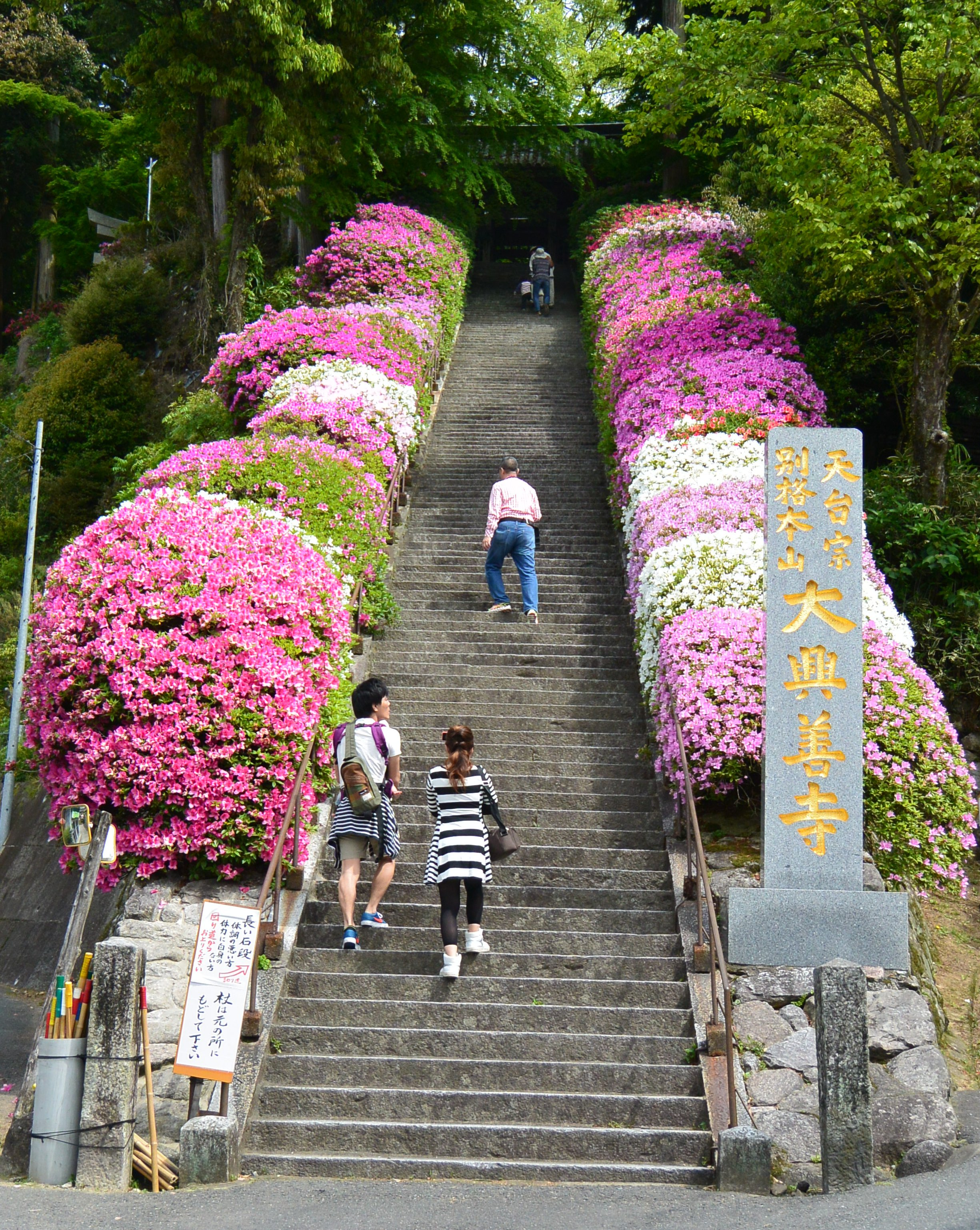
A sando in the spring

Daikōzen-ji (大興善寺) is a Tendai temple in Kiyama, Saga Prefecture, Japan. Its honorary sangō prefix is Komatsuzan (小松山).

== History ==
The temple was founded by Gyōki in 717 A.D. It was razed in 835 A.D., however, it was restored by the Buddhist priest Ennin in 847. In the Kyōroku era around the year 1530 A.D., the temple was burnt down in a war. In 1542, however, the main hall was rebuilt by Tsukushi Korekado (筑紫惟門) who ruled the area. Later, in the Edo period, Kiyama became a part of Tsushima Province, and Sō Yoshinari, the feudal lord of Tsushima Domain helped rebuilt the temple in 1624.

== The Eleven-Faced Kannon ==
The Statue of the Eleven-Faced Kannon (Guanyin or the Goddess of Mercy) is said to have been carved by a priest known as Gyōki. As a "hidden Buddha," it is concealed and can only be seen during the year of the horse every 12 years.

== The Garden ==
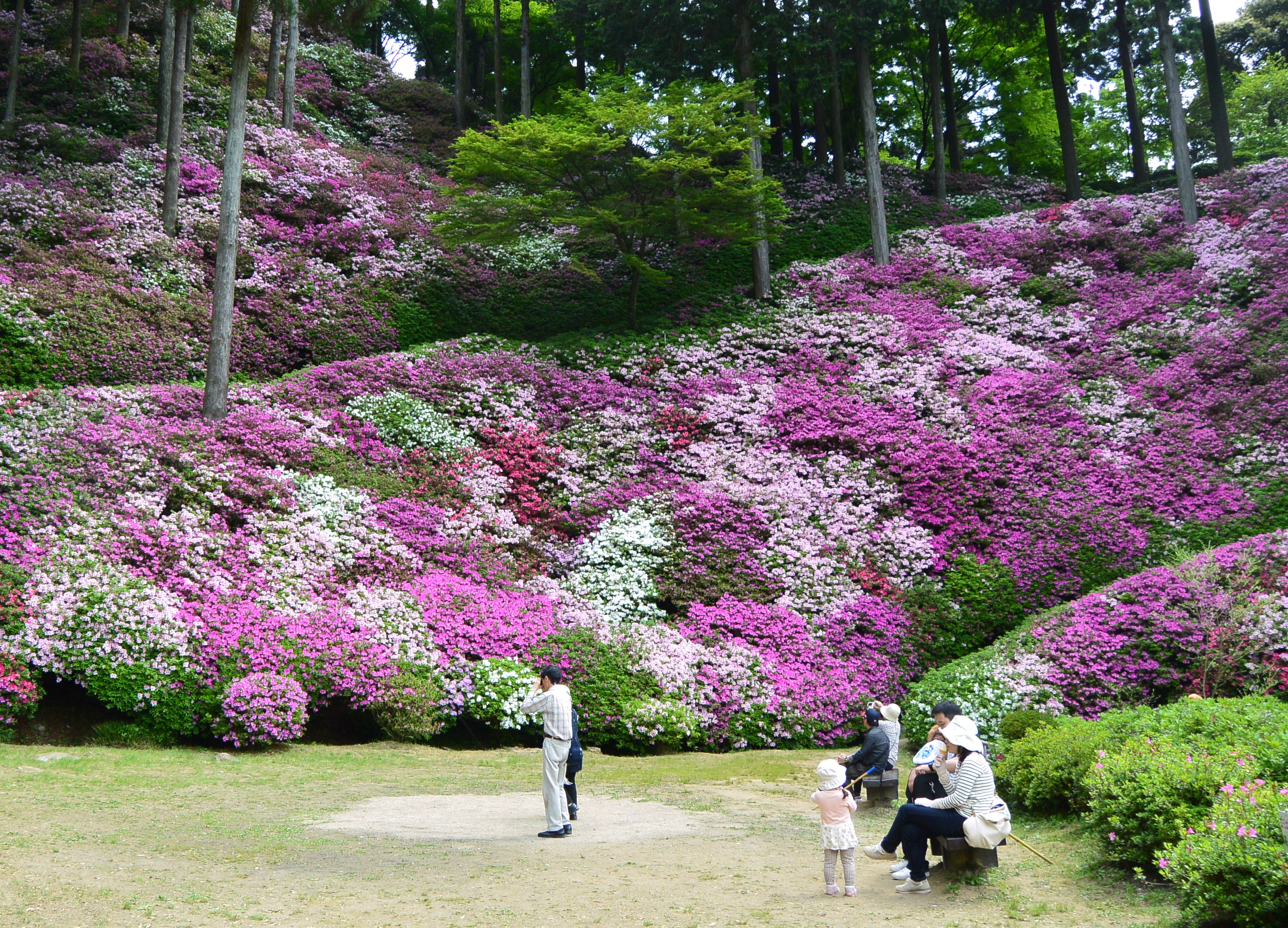
Azalea Garden at Daikōzen-ji

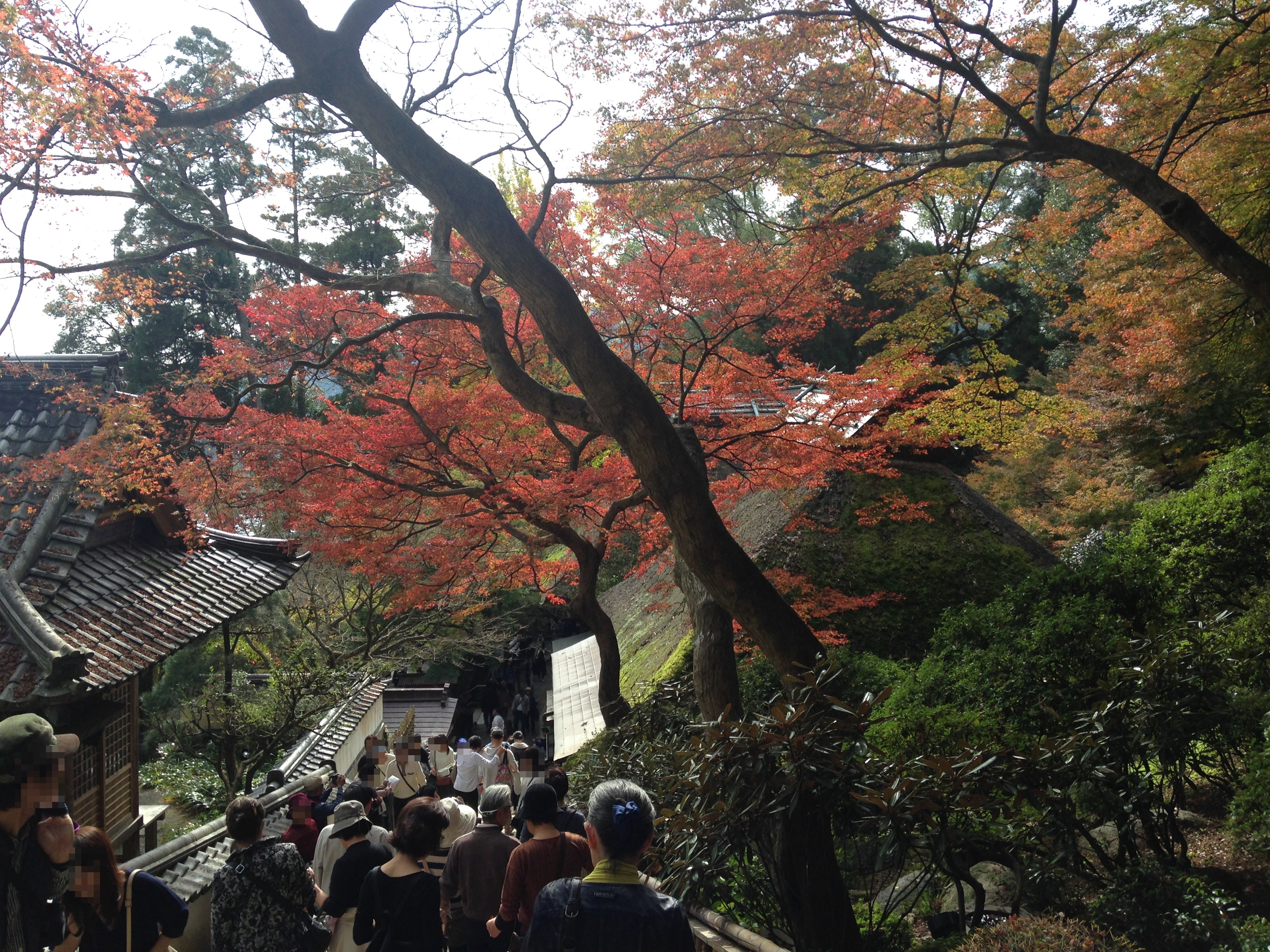
Autumn foliage on the grounds of Daikōzen-ji

The Chigiri-en (契園), behind the main hall, is a forested botanical garden at the foot of Mount Chigiri on the border between Chikushino in Fukuoka Prefecture and Kiyama in Saga Prefecture. In the gardens, in the latter half of April and the early half of May about 50,000 azalea plants are in bloom here in a whirl of color attracting hundreds of flower lovers.
