= Kobe Station (Nagasaki) =

Railway station in Unzen, Nagasaki Prefecture, Japan

Kobe Station 古部駅
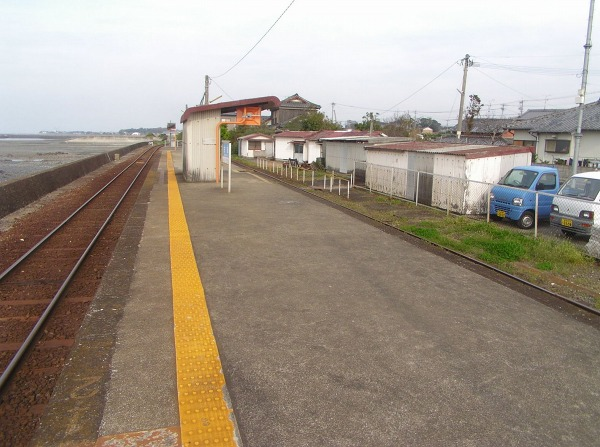
- Kobe Station (Nagasaki)

General information
- Location: Mizuho-chō, Kobe, Unzen-shi, Nagasaki-ken 859-1216; Japan
- Coordinates: 32°51′23.62″N 130°12′49.23″E
- Operator: Shimabara Railway
- Line: ■ Shimabara Railway Line
- Distance: 19.6 km from Isahaya
- Platforms: 1 island platform

Other information
- Status: Unstaffed
- Website: Official website

History
- Opened: 10 October 1912

Passengers
- FY2018: 25 daily

Services
Preceding station	Shimabara Railway	Following station
Azuma towards Isahaya	Shimabara Railway Line	Taishō towards Shimabarakō
Location
- Location within Nagasaki Prefecture Location within Japan

Kobe Station (古部駅, Kobe-eki) is a passenger railway station in located in the city of Unzen, Nagasaki. It is operated by third-sector railway company Shimabara Railway.

== Lines ==
The station is served by the Shimabara Railway Line and is located 19.6 km from the starting point of the line at Isahaya.

== Station layout ==
The station is on the ground level with one side platform. It is an unattended station with no station building. There is a waiting room in the middle of the platform, with a level crossing (without barriers or alarms) south to the outside of the station. There are two bicycle parking lots on either side of the exit to the level crossing, and six sheds used for track maintenance. are located on the south side of the station and to the east of the bicycle parking lot. The north side of the station faces the Ariake Sea.

=== Platforms ===
1	■ ■ Shimabara Railway Line	for Isahaya
2	■ ■Shimabara Railway Line	for Shimabara and Shimabarakō

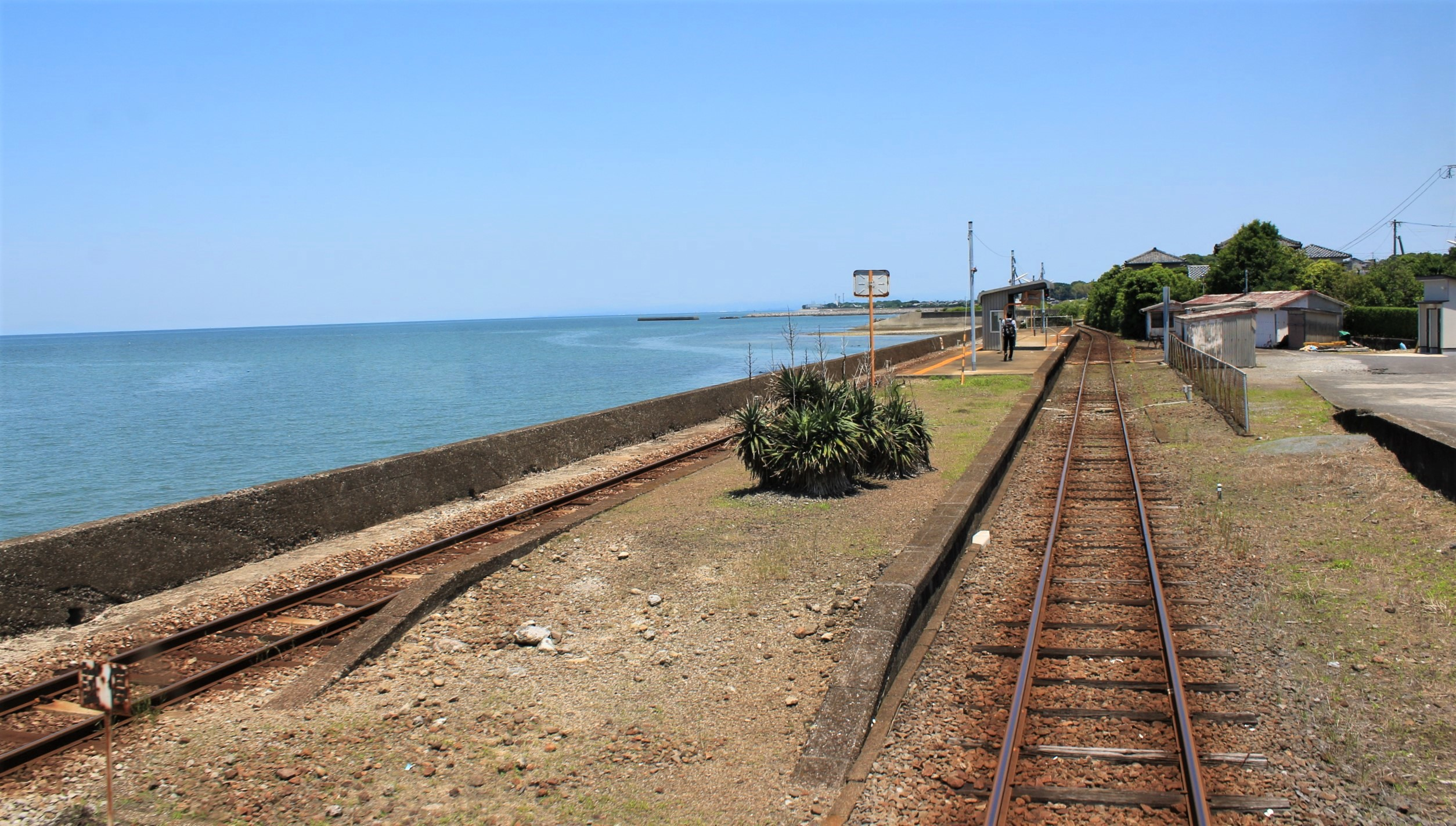
Platform

== History ==
Kobe Station was opened on 10 October 1912.

== Passenger statistics ==
In fiscal 2018, there were a total of 9,113 boarding passengers, given a daily average of 25 passengers.

== Surrounding area ==
- National Route 251

== See also ==
- List of railway stations in Japan
