= Minamikyushu Expressway =

Expressway in Kumamoto and Kagoshima Prefectures, Japan

Minamikyushu Expressway
- 南九州自動車道

Route information
- Length: 140 km (87 mi)
- Existed: 1988–present

Major junctions
- From: Yatsushiro Junction in Yatsushiro, Kumamoto; Kyushu Expressway
- To: Kagoshima Junction in Kagoshima, Kagoshima; Kyushu Expressway; Ibusuki Skyline

Location
- Country: Japan
- Major cities: Minamata, Izumi, Akune, Satsumasendai, Ichikikushikino, Hioki

Highway system
- National highways of Japan; Expressways of Japan

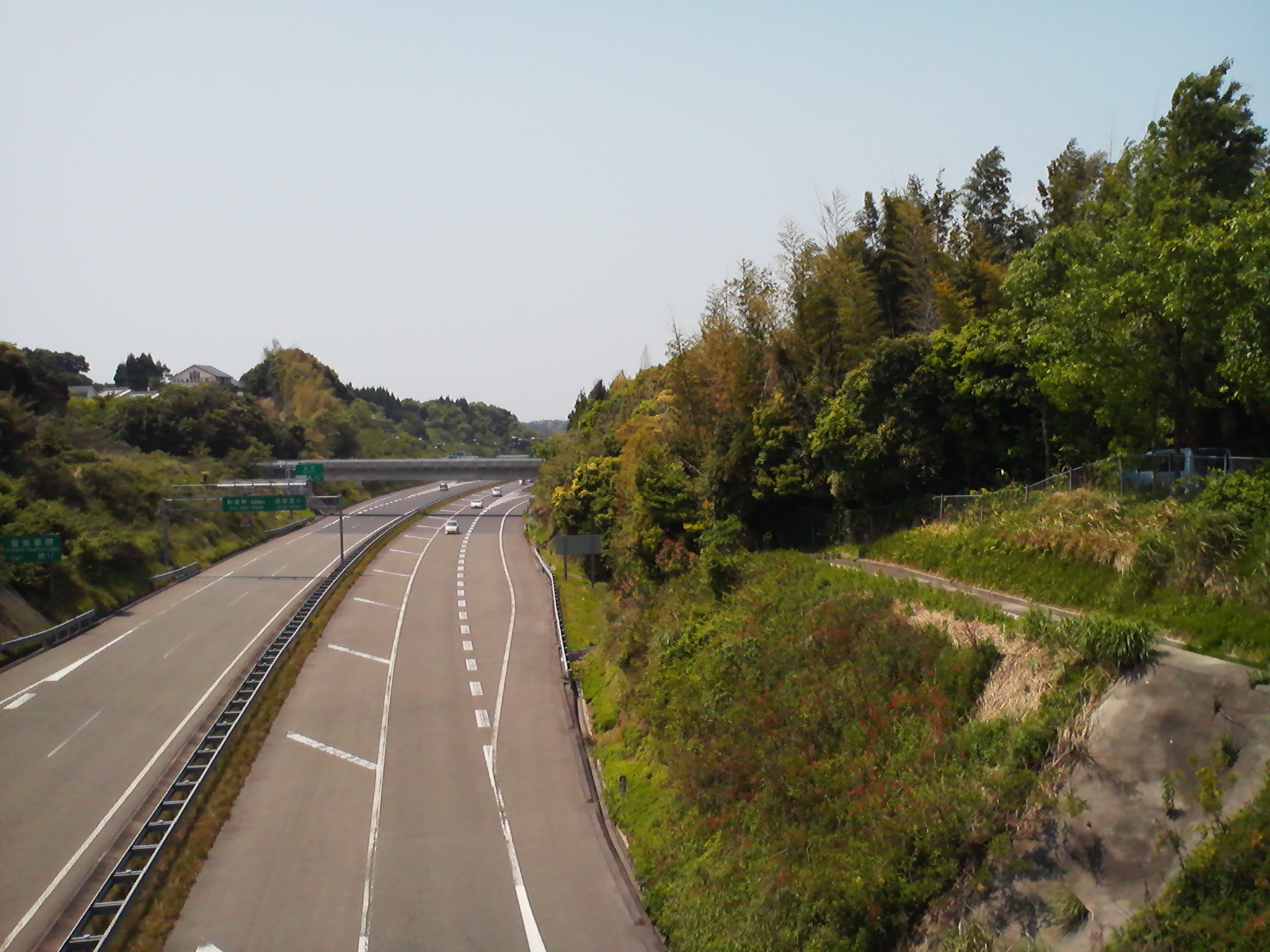
Kagoshima, Japan

Minamikyushu Expressway (南九州自動車道, Minami-Kyūshū jidōshadō) is one of the Expressways of Japan from Yatsushiro to Kagoshima linking with the Kyushu Expressway. It runs through the southern half of Kumamoto prefecture, and the northern half of the Kagoshima prefecture. The total length is 140 km.

== Overview ==
The first section of the expressway was opened to traffic in 1988. As of March 2007 the expressway incomplete in many areas. The next sections are scheduled to open in 2009 (Tanoura Interchange to Ashikita Interchange). After this, Most of the incomplete areas will be built according to the New Direct Control System, whereby the burden for construction costs will be shared by the national and local governments and no tolls will be collected. Currently the section between Hinagu Interchange and Tsunagi Interchange, Noda Interchange and Akune Interchange, and Satsumasendai-Mizuhiki Interchange and Ichiki Interchange operates according to this principle.

The route parallels the Kagoshima Main Line of Kyushu Railway Company and National Route 3 for much of its length.

== History ==
- October 19, 1988, a section from Kagoshima-nishi to Kagoshima Interchange was opened to traffic.
- March 26, 1998, a section from Ijuin to Kagoshima-nishi Interchanges was opened to traffic.
- April 20, 1998, a section from Yatsushiro Junction to Yatsushiro-minami Interchange was opened to traffic.
- October 6, 2001, a section from Yatsushiro-minami to Hinagu Interchange was opened to traffic.
- April 6, 2002, a section from Ichiki to Ijuin Interchanges was opened to traffic.
- February 27, 2005, a section from Hinagu to Tanoura Interchange was opened to traffic.
- March 13, 2005, a section from Kushikino to Ichiki Interchange was opened to traffic.
- March 3, 2007, a section from Satsumasendai-Miyako to Kushikino Interchange was opened to traffic.
- March 31, 2008, the Miyama Interchange was opened.
- April 29, 2009, a section from Tanoura to Ashikita Interchange was opened to traffic.
- March 10, 2013, a section from Satsumasendai-Mizuhiki to Satsumasendai-Takae Interchange was opened to traffic.
- March 7, 2015, a section from Satsumasendai-Takae to Satsumasendai-Miyako Interchange was opened to traffic.
- March 29, 2015, a section from Akune-kita to Akune Interchange was opened to traffic.
- December 19, 2015, a section from Noda to Akune-kita Interchange was opened to traffic.
- February 27, 2016, a section from Ashikita to Tsunagi Interchange was opened to traffic.
- March 11, 2017, a section from Tanaono-kita to Noda Interchange was opened to traffic.
- November 12, 2017, a section from Izumi to Tanaono-kita Interchange was opened to traffic.
- March 2, 2019, a section from Tsunagi to Minamata Interchange was opened to traffic.

== Interchanges ==
- IC - interchange, JCT - junction, SA - service area, PA - parking area, BS - bus stop, TN - tunnel, BR - bridge, TB - toll gate
- Bus stops labeled "○" are currently in use; those marked "◆" are closed.

No.	Name	Connections	Dist. from Origin	Dist. from Terminus	Bus stop	Notes	Location	
(18-1)	Yatsushiro JCT	Kyushu Expressway	0.0	141.9		Only accessible for Kumamoto and Fukuoka	Kumamoto	Yatsushiro
1	Yatsushiro-Minami IC	National Route 3	6.6	135.3			Kumamoto	Yatsushiro
TB	Hinagu TB		10.4	131.5			Kumamoto	Yatsushiro
2	Hinagu IC	National Route 3	12.0	129.9			Kumamoto	Yatsushiro
3	Tanoura IC	National Route 3	20.8	121.1			Kumamoto	Ashikita
4	Ashikita IC	Pref. Route 27 (Ashikita Kuma Route)	28.8	113.1			Kumamoto	Ashikita
5	Tsunagi IC	National Route 3	36.5	105.4			Kumamoto	Tsunagi
6	Minamata IC	National Route 3 National Route 268	42.1	99.8			Kumamoto	Minamata
<7>	Fukuro IC	National Route 3	49.5	92.4		Planned	Kumamoto	Minamata
<8>	Izumi-Kita IC		53.9	88.0		Planned	Kagoshima	Izumi
9	Izumi IC	National Route 328	58.4	83.5			Kagoshima	Izumi
10	Takaono-Kita IC	Pref. Route 374 (Izumi Takaono Route)	62.3	79.6			Kagoshima	Izumi
11	Noda IC	Pref. Route 368 (Arasaki Tashiro Route)	65.1	76.8			Kagoshima	Izumi
12	Akune-Kita IC	National Route 3 National Route 389; Hokusatsu-Odan Road (planned)	69.1	72.8			Kagoshima	Akune
13	Akune IC	Pref. Route 46 (Akune Togo Route)	73.3	68.6			Kagoshima	Akune
<14>	Nishime IC	National Route 3	77.4	64.5		Planned	Kagoshima	Akune
<15>	Okawa IC	National Route 3	82.7	59.2		Planned	Kagoshima	Akune
<16>	Yuda-Nishikata IC		90.5	51.4		Planned	Kagoshima	Satumasendai
17	Satsumasendai-Mizuhiki IC	National Route 3	95.7	46.2			Kagoshima	Satumasendai
18	Satsumasendai-Takae IC	Pref. Route 43 (Sendai Kushikino Route)	99.2	42.7			Kagoshima	Satumasendai
19	Satumasendai-Miyako IC	National Route 3 (Kumanojō Bypass)	105.9	36.0			Kagoshima	Satumasendai
TN	Miyako Tunnel		106.6	35.3			Kagoshima	Satumasendai
TN	Kinzan Tunnel		111.1	30.8			Kagoshima	Ichikikushikino
20	Kushikino IC	Pref. Route 39 (Kushikino Hiwaki Route)	112.4	29.5			Kagoshima	Ichikikushikino
BS	Ichiki BS		115.9	26.0	◆		Kagoshima	Ichikikushikino
TN	Osato Tunnel		116.9	25.0			Kagoshima	Ichikikushikino
21	Ichiki IC	National Route 3	119.7	22.2			Kagoshima	Ichikikushikino
BS	Higashi-Ichiki BS		120.7	21.2	○		Kagoshima	Hioki
22	Miyama IC		124.7	17.2		Only accessible for Kagoshima	Kagoshima	Hioki
PA	Miyama PA		124.7	17.2			Kagoshima	Hioki
TB	Miyama TB		124.9	17.0			Kagoshima	Hioki
BS	Ijuin BS		129.3	12.6	○		Kagoshima	Hioki
23	Ijuin IC	Pref. Route 206 (Tokushige Yokoi Kagoshima Route)	130.8	11.1			Kagoshima	Hioki
24	Matsumoto IC/TB	Pref. Route 210 (Koyamada Taniyama Route)	135.6	6.3			Kagoshima	Kagoshima
BS	Matsumoto BS		136.3	5.6	◆		Kagoshima	Kagoshima
25	Kagoshima-Nishi IC	Pref. Route 24 (Kagoshima Higashiichiki Route)	141.0	0.9			Kagoshima	Kagoshima
(29)	Kagoshima IC/JCT	Kyushu Expressway Ibusuki Skyline	141.9	0.0			Kagoshima	Kagoshima
Kagoshima Tozai Doro

== Lanes ==
- 2-lane

== See also ==
- Kyushu Expressway
- Japan National Route 3
- Kagoshima Main Line
- West Nippon Expressway Company
