= Abozaki Station =

Railway station in Unzen, Nagasaki Prefecture, Japan

Abozaki Station 阿母崎駅
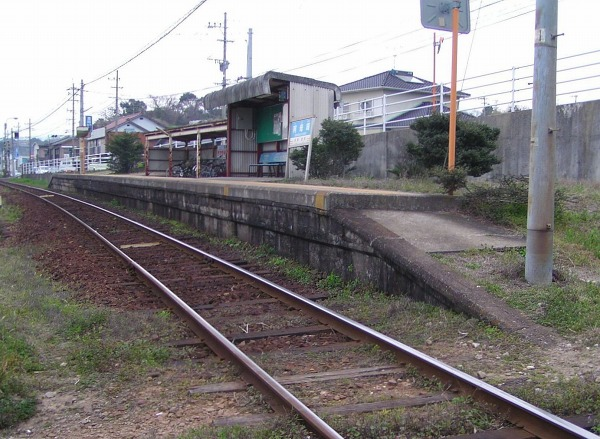
- Abozaki Station

General information
- Location: Azuma-chō, Abomyo, Unzen-shi, Nagasaki-ken 859-1116; Japan
- Coordinates: 32°49′47.95″N 130°10′13.74″E
- Operator: Shimabara Railway
- Line: ■ Shimabara Railway Line
- Distance: 14.4 km from Isahaya
- Platforms: 1 side platform

Other information
- Status: Unstaffed
- Website: Official website

History
- Opened: 9 March 1955
- Former names: Azumazaki (to 1960)

Passengers
- FY2018: 34 daily

Services
Preceding station	Shimabara Railway	Following station
Aino towards Isahaya	Shimabara Railway Line	Azuma towards Shimabarakō
Location
- Location within Nagasaki Prefecture Location within Japan

Abozaki Station (阿母崎駅, Abozaki-eki) is a passenger railway station in located in the city of Unzen, Nagasaki. It is operated by third-sector railway company Shimabara Railway.

== Lines ==
The station is served by the Shimabara Railway Line and is located 14.4 km from the starting point of the line at Isahaya.

== Station layout ==
The station is on the ground level with one side platform and one track. It is an attended station and does not have a station building. There is a waiting room and bicycle parking area on the platform, but the platform itself is slightly curved (as the station is located on a curve).

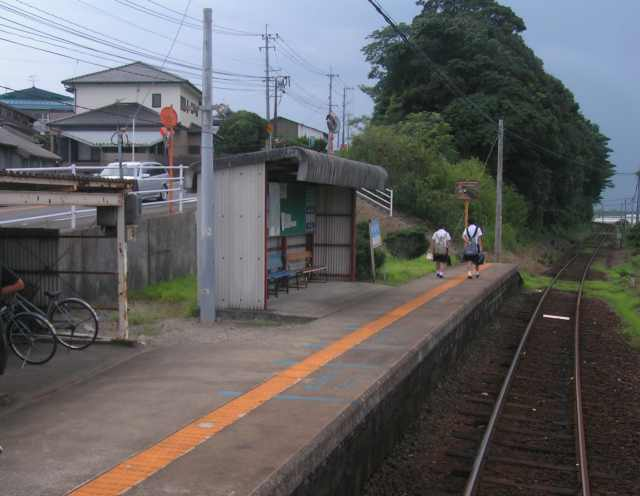
Platform

== History ==
Abozaki Station was opened on 9 March 1955 as Azumazaki Station (吾妻崎駅). The station was renamed on 5 November 1960.

== Passenger statistics ==
In fiscal 2018, there were a total of 12,278 boarding passengers, given a daily average of 34 passengers.

== Surrounding area ==
- National Route 251

== See also ==
- List of railway stations in Japan
