= Azuma Station =

Railway station in Unzen, Nagasaki Prefecture, Japan

Azuma Station 吾妻駅
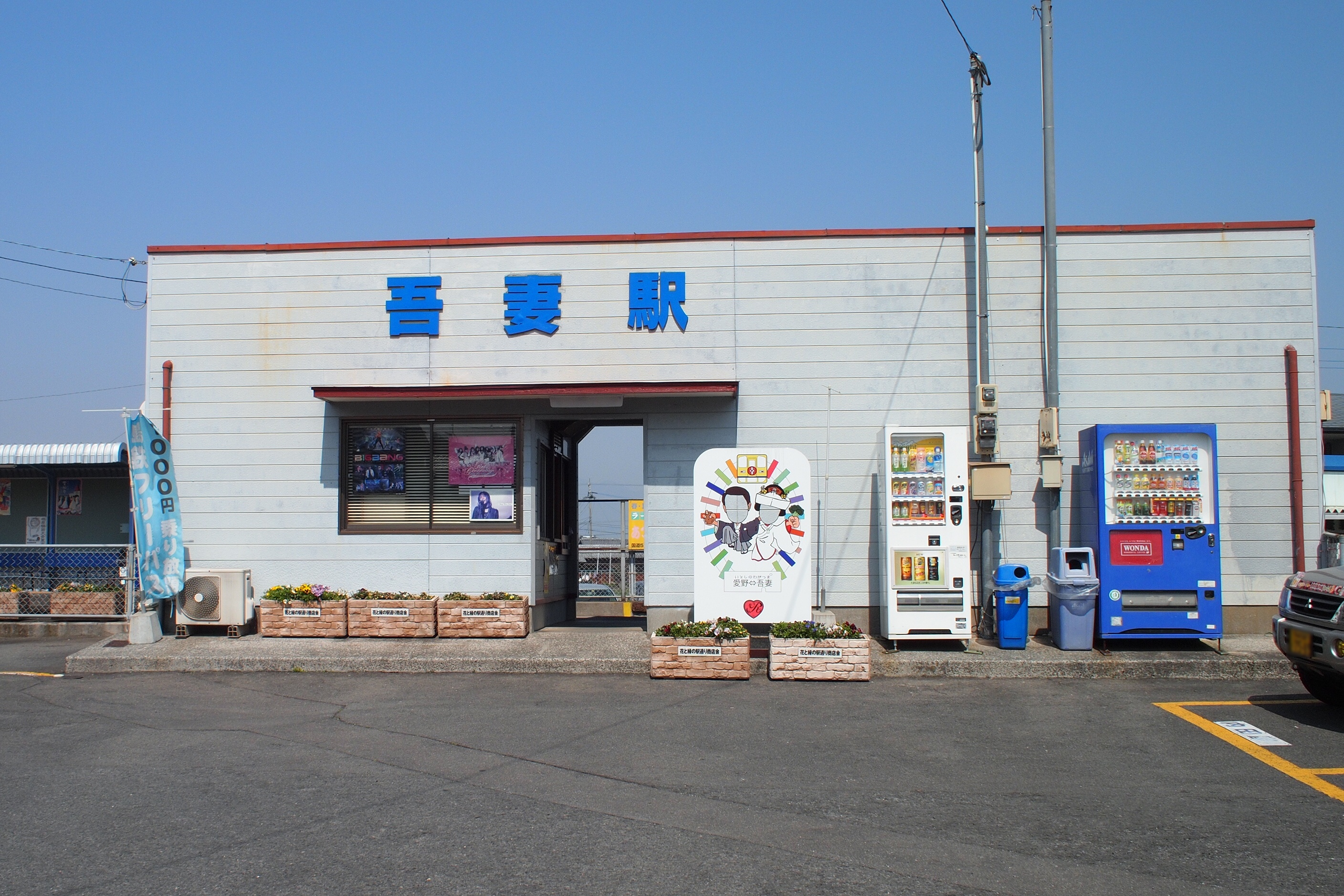
- Azuma Station

General information
- Location: Azuma-chō, Ushiguchimyo, Unzen-shi, Nagasaki-ken 859-1107; Japan
- Coordinates: 32°50′25.5″N 130°11′23.71″E
- Operator: Shimabara Railway
- Line: ■ Shimabara Railway Line
- Distance: 16.6 km from Isahaya
- Platforms: 2 side platforms

Other information
- Status: Staffed
- Website: Official website

History
- Opened: 10 October 1912
- Former names: Yamadamura (to 1960)

Passengers
- FY2018: 96 daily

Services
Preceding station	Shimabara Railway	Following station
Abozaki towards Isahaya	Shimabara Railway Line	Kobe towards Shimabarakō
Location
- Location within Nagasaki Prefecture Location within Japan

Azuma Station (吾妻駅, Azuma-eki) is a passenger railway station in located in the city of Unzen, Nagasaki. It is operated by third-sector railway company Shimabara Railway.

== Lines ==
The station is served by the Shimabara Railway Line and is located 16.6 km from the starting point of the line at Isahaya.

== Station layout ==
The station is on the ground level with two opposing staggered side platforms. The station building is adjacent to the south side of the south platform facing Abozaki, and a waiting room is located in the middle of the north platform.

=== Platforms ===
1	■ ■ Shimabara Railway Line	for Isahaya
2	■ ■Shimabara Railway Line	for Shimabara and Shimabarakō

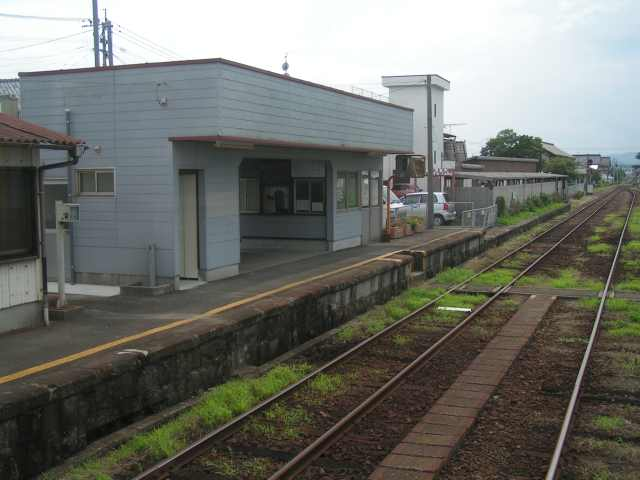
Platforms

== History ==
Azuma Station was opened on 10 October 1912 as Yamadamura Station (山田村駅). The station was renamed on 5 November 1960. In September 1986 the existing station building was completed.

== Passenger statistics ==
In fiscal 2018, there were a total of 35,047 boarding passengers, given a daily average of 96 passengers.

== Surrounding area ==
- Unzen City Hall
- Unzen City Tsuruta Elementary School
- Unzen City Otsuka Elementary School
- Unzen City Azuma Junior High School

== See also ==
- List of railway stations in Japan
