= Kiyama, Saga =

Kiyama 基山町
- Town
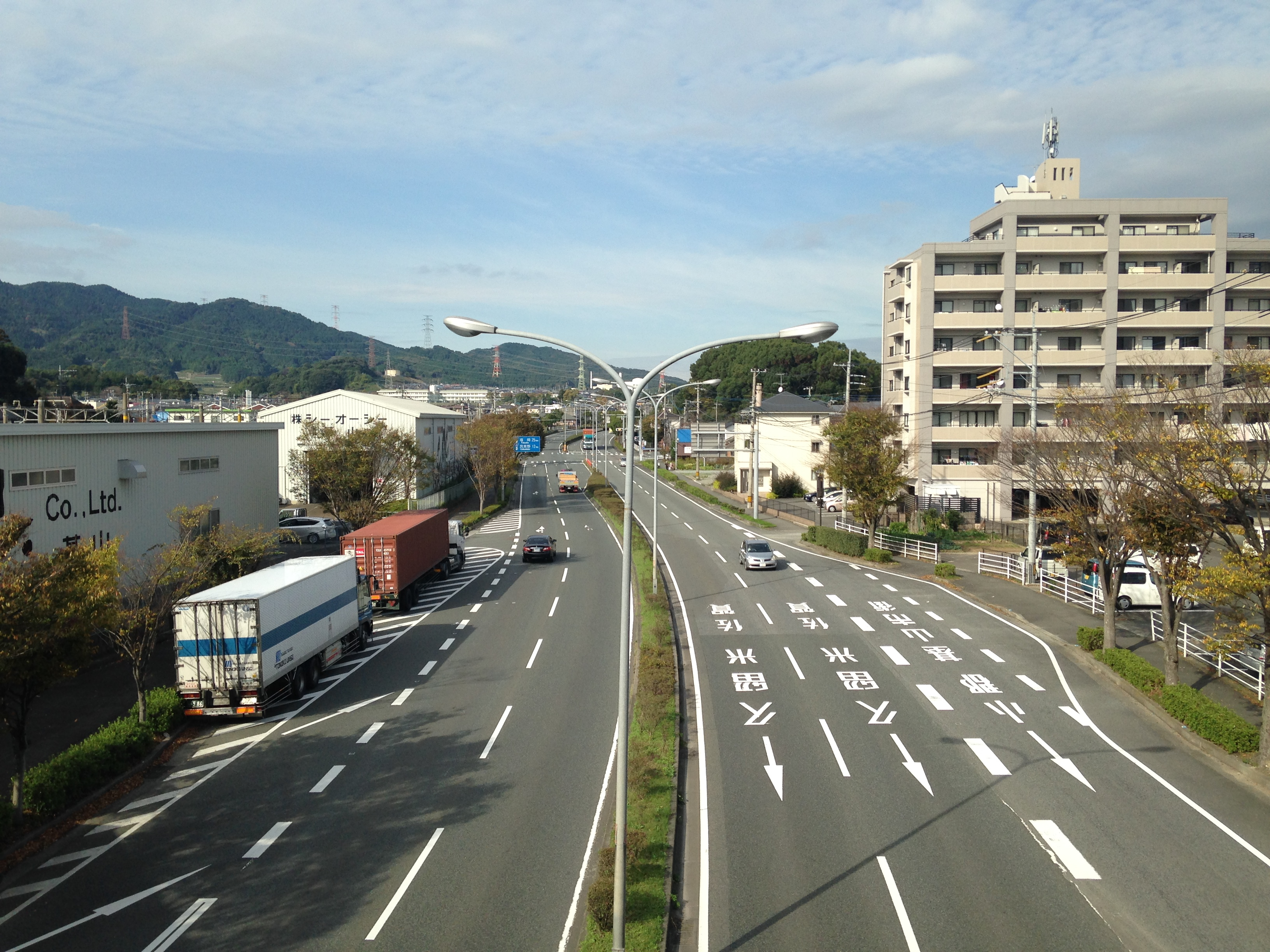
- Japan National Route 3 from footbridge of Kiyama Station

- Flag Emblem
- Interactive map of Kiyama
- Location in Japan
- Coordinates: 33°25′37″N 130°31′23″E
- Country: Japan
- Region: Kyushu
- Prefecture: Saga
- District: Miyaki

Area
  - Total: 22.15 km^{2} (8.55 sq mi)

Population (April 30, 2024)
  - Total: 17,559
  - Density: 792.7/km^{2} (2,053/sq mi)
- Time zone: UTC+09:00 (JST)
- City hall address: 666 Ōaza Miyaura, Kiyama-chō, Miyaki-gun, Saga-ken 841-0204
- Website: Official website
- Symbols
- Flower: Azalea
- Tree: Azalea

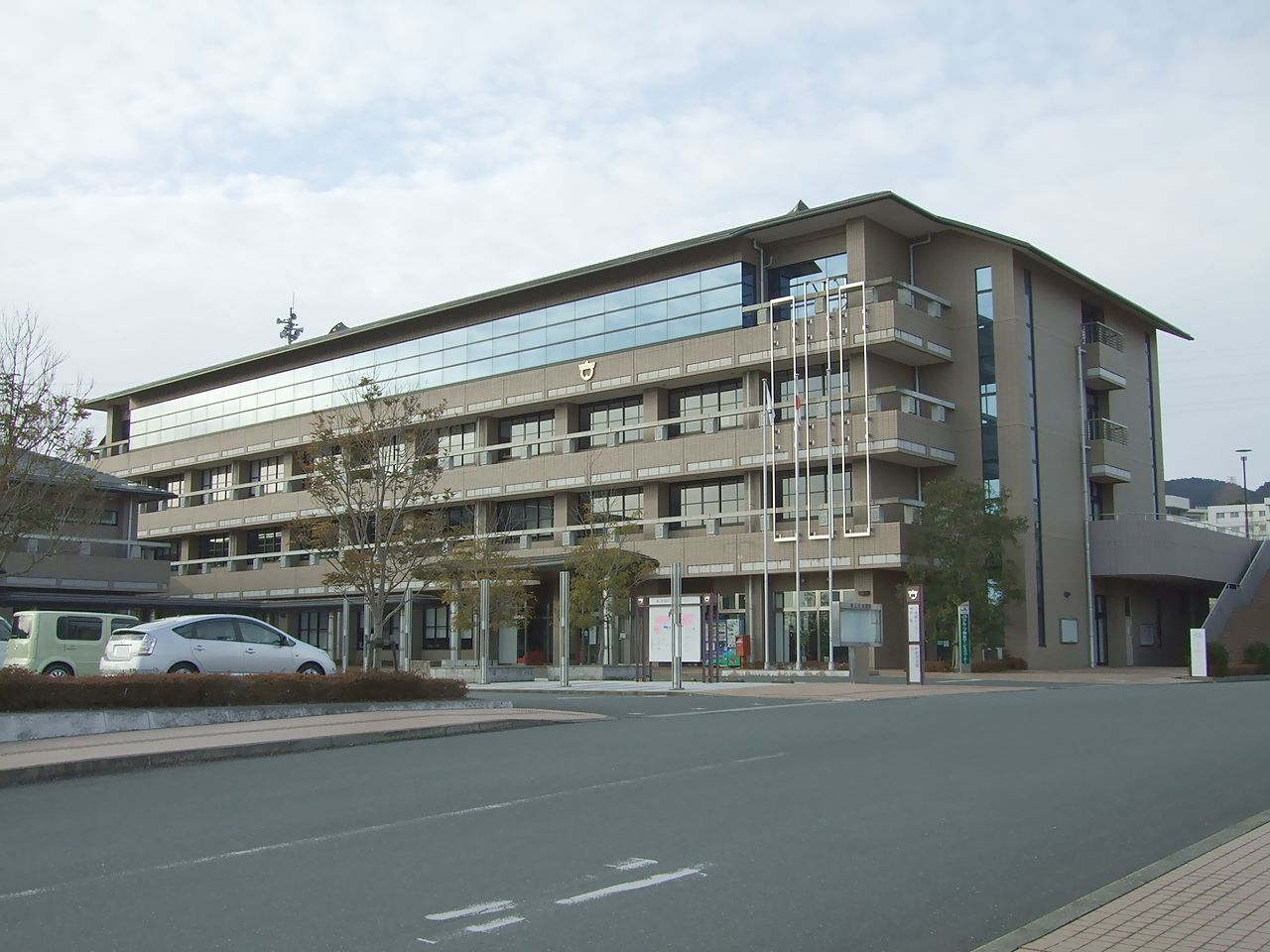
Kiyama Town Office

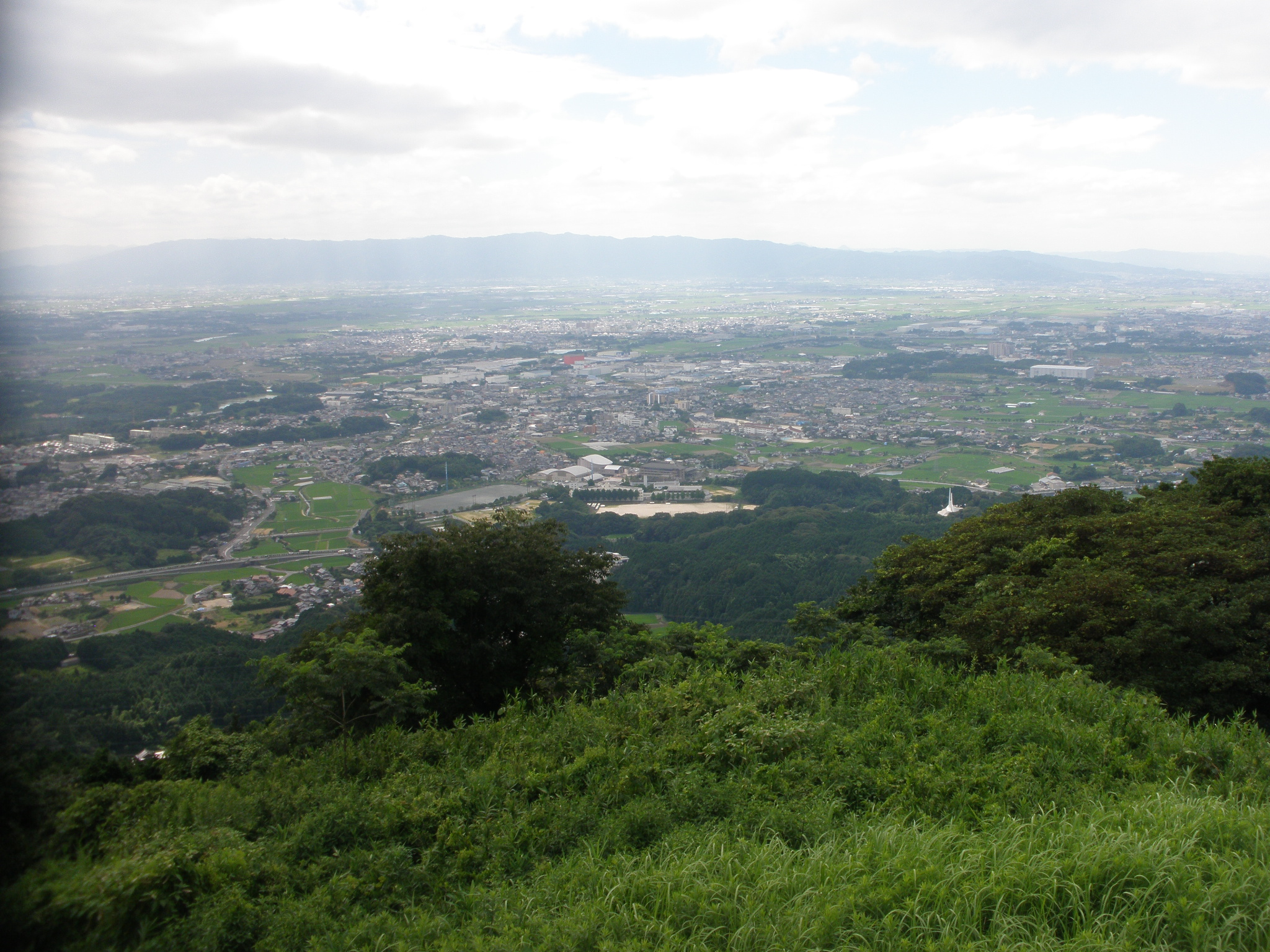
View of Kiyama from the south

Kiyama (基山町, Kiyama-chō) is a town located in Miyaki District, Saga Prefecture, Japan on the island of Kyūshū. As of 31 March 2024, the town had an estimated population of 17,559 in 7508 households, and a population density of 750 persons per km^{2}. The total area of the town is 22.15 km^{2} (8.55 sq mi).

== Geography ==
Kiyama is located on the eastern end of Saga Prefecture. It shares its southern border with Tosu and the rest of the town borders Fukuoka Prefecture.

=== Adjoining municipalities ===
Fukuoka Prefecture

- Chikushino
- Ogōri

Saga Prefecture

- Tosu

=== Climate ===
Kiyama has a humid subtropical climate (Köppen Cfa) characterized by warm summers and cool winters with light to no snowfall. The average annual temperature in Kiyama is 15.1 °C. The average annual rainfall is 1766 mm with September as the wettest month. The temperatures are highest on average in August, at around 26.2 °C, and lowest in January, at around 4.3 °C.

=== Demographics ===
Per Japanese census data, the population of Kiyama is as shown below.

Historical population
Year	Pop.	±%
1940	7,153	—
1950	8,952	+25.2%
1960	9,458	+5.7%
1970	9,735	+2.9%
1980	11,501	+18.1%
1990	14,455	+25.7%
2000	19,176	+32.7%
2010	17,837	−7.0%
2020	17,250	−3.3%

== History ==
The area of Kiyama is part of ancient Hizen Province. After the defeat of the combined Baekje and Yamato Japan forces, at the hands of the Silla and Tang China alliance at the Battle of Hakusukinoe in 663, the Yamato court feared an invasion from either or both Tang or Silla. In response, a huge network of fortifications was constructed, one of which was Kii Castle, intended to protect regional administration center of Dazaifu. During the Sengoku period, the Tsukushi clan, a member of the Shōni clan, ruled this area. In 1587, after Toyotomi Hideyoshi conquered Kyushu, this area became the territory of Kobayakawa Takakage. After that, the land became an enclave territory of the Sō clan of Tsushima-Fuchū Domain until the Meiji restoration. The village of Kiyama was established on April 1, 1889, with the creation of the modern municipalities system. Kiyama gained town status on January 1, 1939.

== Government ==
Kiyama has a mayor-council form of government with a directly elected mayor and a unicameral town council of 13 members. Kiyama, together with the other municipalities in Miyaki District contributes two members to the Saga Prefectural Assembly. In terms of national politics, the town is part of the Saga 1st district of the lower house of the Diet of Japan.

== Economy ==
Kiyama can be considered part of an economic sphere with nearby cities Tosu in Saga Prefecture and Ogōri and Kurume in Fukuoka Prefecture. Approximately 10 percent of the population of Kiyama works or goes to school in the city of Fukuoka and as such Kiyama can be considered a part of the Fukuoka metropolitan area. It is also known as a commuter town for Kurume. The city is attracting factories by taking advantage of its location near the Kyushu Expressway, the main artery of Kyushu, and Japan National Route 3.

== Education ==
Kiyama has two public elementary schools and one public junior high schools operated by the town government. The town does not have a high school, but there is one private junior high school and one private combined Junior/Senior high school.

== Transportation ==
=== Railway ===
JR Kyushu - Kagoshima Main Line

JB Keyakidai - Kiyama

Amagi Railway Amagi Line

- Kiyama - Tateno

=== Highways ===
- Kyushu Expressway
- National Route 3

== Local attractions ==
- Araho-jinja, a Shinto shrine
- Daikōzenji (in the later half of April and the early half of May about 50,000 azaleas are in bloom here)
- Kii Castle (National Historic Site)
- Ryūkōtokuji, a temple of Shingon Buddhism

== Notable people from Kiyama ==
- Yasuhisa Hara, manga artist
