= Japan National Route 219 =

Road in Japan

National Route 219
- 国道219号
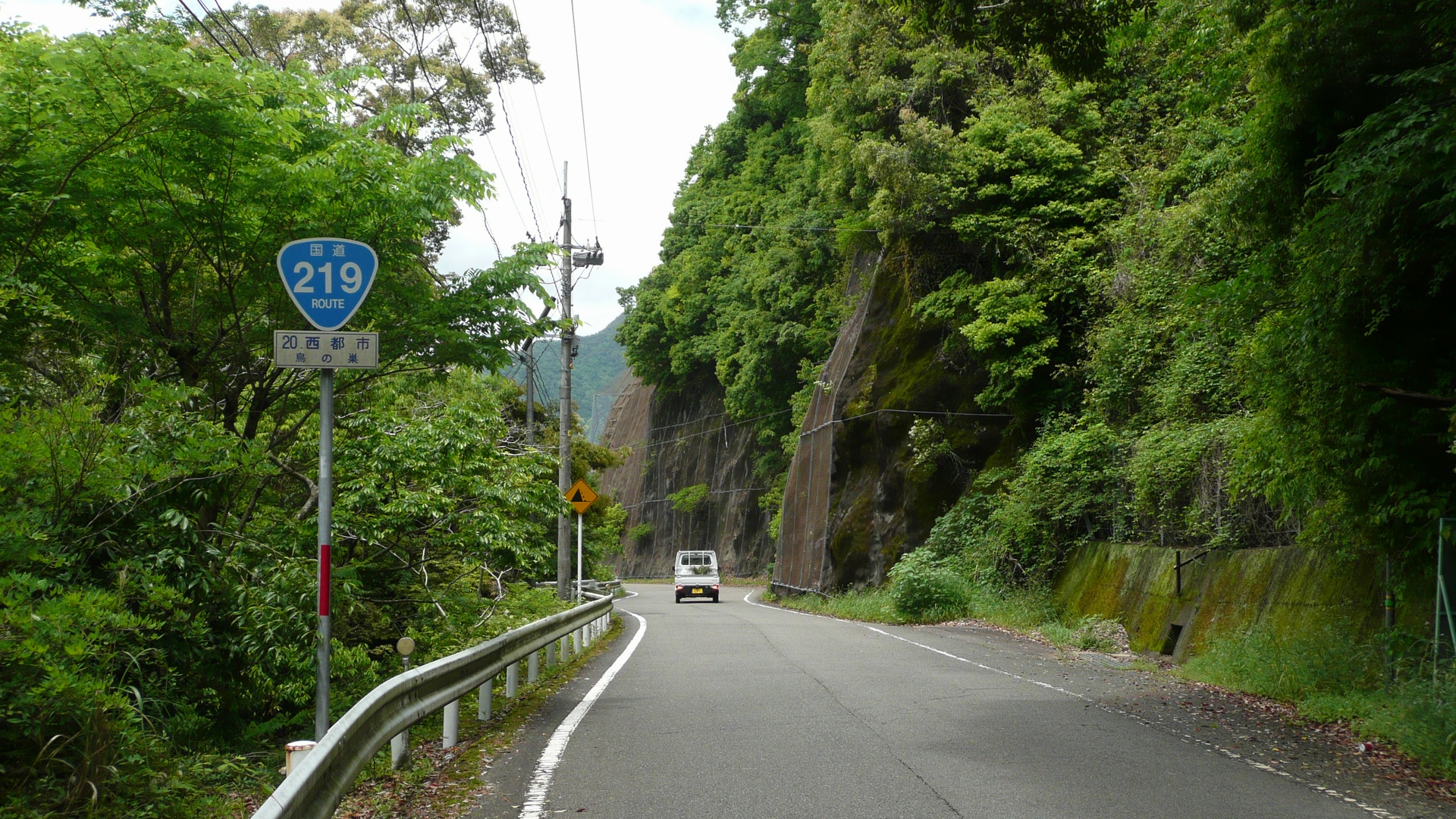

Route information
- Length: 170.4 km (105.9 mi)
- Existed: 18 May 1953–present

Major junctions
- North end: National Route 3 in Chūō-ku, Kumamoto
- South end: National Route 10 in Miyazaki

Location
- Country: Japan

Highway system
- National highways of Japan; Expressways of Japan
← National Route 218	→ National Route 220

National Route 219 is a national highway of Japan connecting Chūō-ku, Kumamoto, and Miyazaki in Japan, with a total length of 170.4 km (105.88 mi).
