= Japan National Route 218 =

Road in Japan

National Route 218
- 国道218号
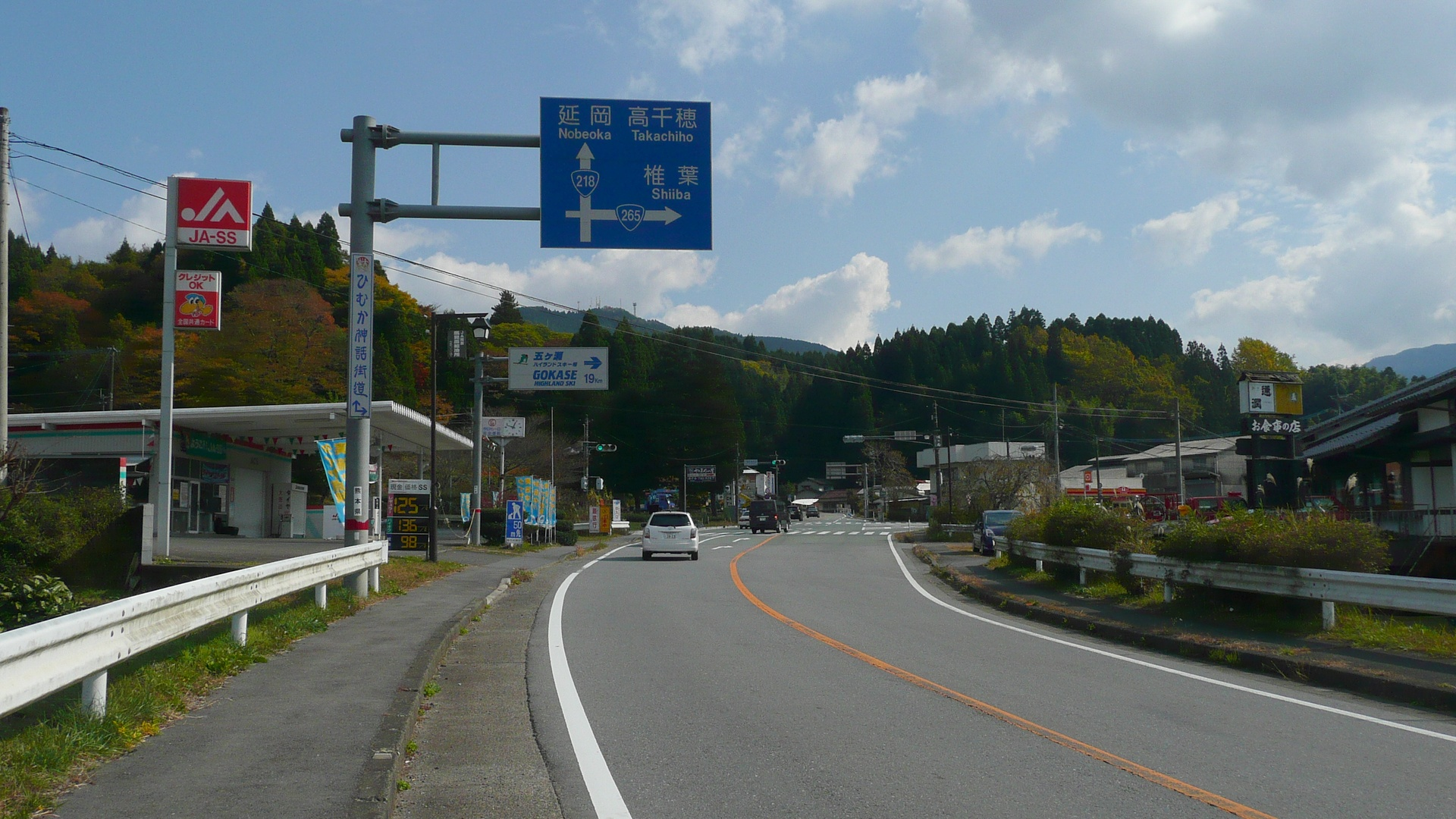

Route information
- Length: 145.9 km (90.7 mi)
- Existed: 18 May 1953–present

Major junctions
- West end: National Route 3 in Chūō-ku, Kumamoto
- East end: National Route 10 in Nobeoka

Location
- Country: Japan

Highway system
- National highways of Japan; Expressways of Japan
← National Route 217	→ National Route 219

National Route 218 is a national highway of Japan connecting Chūō-ku, Kumamoto and Nobeoka, with a total length of 145.9 km (90.66 mi).
