= Japan National Route 3 =

National highway in Japan

National Route 3
- 国道3号

Route information
- Length: 392.1 km (243.6 mi)
- Existed: 4 December 1952–present

Major junctions
- South end: National Route 10 in Kagoshima, Kagoshima
- North end: National Route 2 in Moji-ku, Kitakyushu

Location
- Country: Japan

Highway system
- National highways of Japan; Expressways of Japan
← National Route 2	→ National Route 4

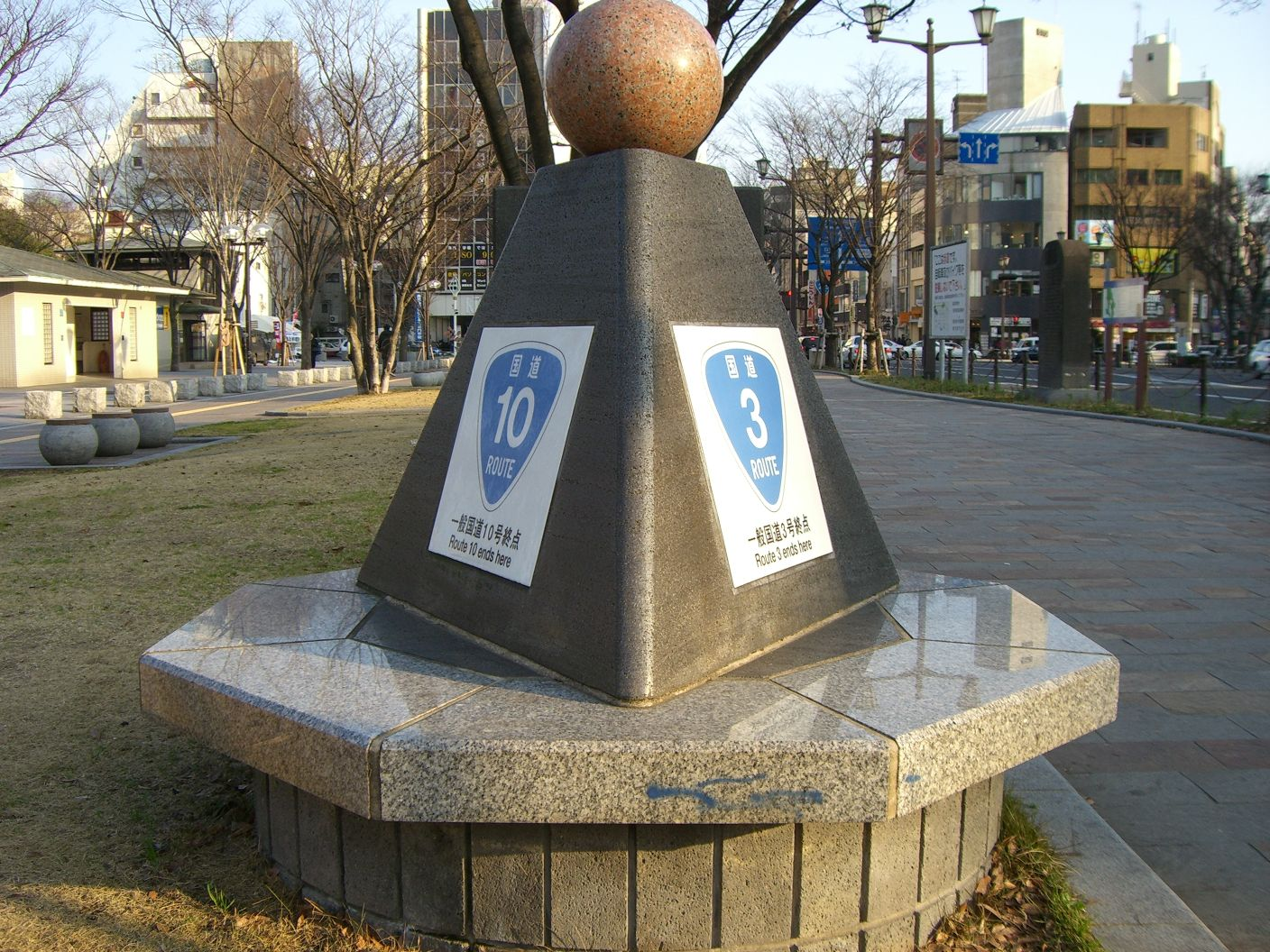
Ending milestone of Route 3, Route 10 and Route 225 at the central park in the city of Kagoshima

National Route 3 (国道3号, Kokudō San-gō) is a major highway on the island of Kyūshū in Japan. It connects the prefectural capital cities of Kagoshima (Kagoshima Prefecture), Kumamoto (Kumamoto Prefecture), and Fukuoka (Fukuoka Prefecture), passing through Kurume as well.

Its northern terminus is Moji-ku, Kitakyushu, where it meets National Route 2.

The total length of National Route 3 is 392.1 km.

== Route data ==
- Length: 392.1 km (243.7 mi)
- Origin: Moji-ku, Kitakyūshū (originates at the terminus of Route 2)
- Terminus: Kagoshima (ends at the terminus of Routes 10, 224, 225 and 226 and the origins of Route 58)
- Major cities: Kitakyūshū, Fukuoka, Kurume, Kumamoto, Kagoshima

== History ==
- 4 December 1952 - First Class National Highway 3 (from Kitakyūshū to Kagoshima)
- 1 April 1965 - General National Highway 3 (from Kitakyushu to Kagoshima)

== Overlapping sections ==
- From Moji-ku, Kitakyushu (Oimatsu-Park intersection) to Kokurakita-ku, Kitakyūshū (Mihagino intersection): Route 10
- From Kurume to Yamaga (Chuo Street intersection): Route 325
- From Yamaga (Nishiue-machi intersection) to Yamaga (Chuo Street intersection): Route 443
- From Kita-ku, Kumamoto (Ueki-machi Mouno intersection) to Chūō-ku, Kumamoto (Suido-cho intersection): Route 208
- From Minami-ku, Kumamoto (Chikami-machi intersection) to Uto (Matsuwara intersection): Route 57
- From Chūō-ku, Kumamoto (Suido-cho intersection) to Uki (Matsubase-machi Kugu): Route 218
- From Chūō-ku, Kumamoto (Suido-cho intersection) to Yatsushiro (Hagiwara-machi intersection): Route 219
- From Kagoshima Koyamada-chō (Koyamada-chō intersection) to Kagoshima Shiroyama-chō (Terukuni Shrine intersection): Route 328

== Municipalities passed through ==
- Fukuoka Prefecture
  - Kitakyūshū - Mizumaki - Onga - Okagaki - Munakata - Fukutsu - Koga - Shingu - Fukuoka - Onojō - Dazaifu - Chikushino - (via Saga Prefecture) - Kurume - Hirokawa - Yame
- Saga Prefecture
  - Kiyama - Tosu
- Kumamoto Prefecture
  - Yamaga - Kumamoto - Uto - Uki - Hikawa - Yatsushiro - Ashikita - Tsunagi - Minamata
- Kagoshima Prefecture
  - Izumi - Akune - Satsumasendai - Ichikikushikino - Hioki - Kagoshima
