= Taishō Station (Nagasaki) =

Railway station in Unzen, Nagasaki Prefecture, Japan

Taishō Station 大正駅
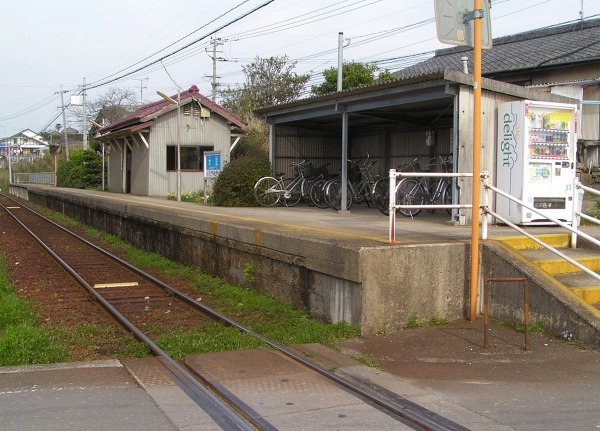
- Taishō Station (Nagasaki) in 2007

General information
- Location: Mizuho-chō, Unzen-shi, Nagasaki-ken 859-1215; Japan
- Coordinates: 32°51′23.62″N 130°12′49.23″E
- Operator: Shimabara Railway
- Line: ■ Shimabara Railway Line
- Distance: 20.8 km from Isahaya
- Platforms: 1 side platform

Other information
- Status: Unstaffed
- Website: Official website

History
- Opened: 9 March 1955

Passengers
- FY2018: 26 daily

Services
Preceding station	Shimabara Railway	Following station
Kobe towards Isahaya	Shimabara Railway Line	Saigō towards Shimabarakō
Location
- Location within Nagasaki Prefecture Location within Japan

Taishō Station (大正駅, Taishō-eki) is a passenger railway station in located in the city of Unzen, Nagasaki. It is operated by third-sector railway company Shimabara Railway.

== Lines ==
The station is served by the Shimabara Railway Line and is located 20.8 km from the starting point of the line at Isahaya.

== Station layout ==
The station is on the ground level with one side platform and one track. It is an attended station and does not have a station building. In October of 2023, the station building burned down due to a careless smoker. His case was subsequently sent to prosecutors on negligence charges.

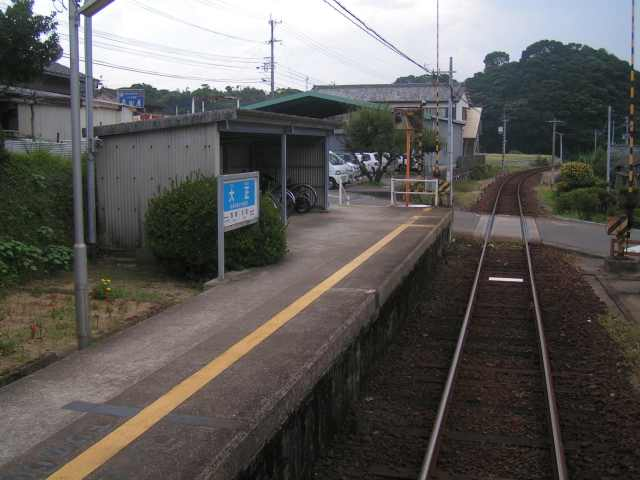
Platform

== History ==
Taishō Station was opened on 9 March 1955.

== Passenger statistics ==
In fiscal 2018, there were a total of 9,372 boarding passengers, given a daily average of 26 passengers.

== Surrounding area ==
- National Route 251
- Mizuho Economic Agricultural Management Center
- Unzen City Taisho Elementary School
- Taisho Fishing Port

== See also ==
- List of railway stations in Japan
