= Aino Station (Nagasaki) =

Railway station in Unzen, Nagasaki Prefecture, Japan

Aino Station 愛野駅
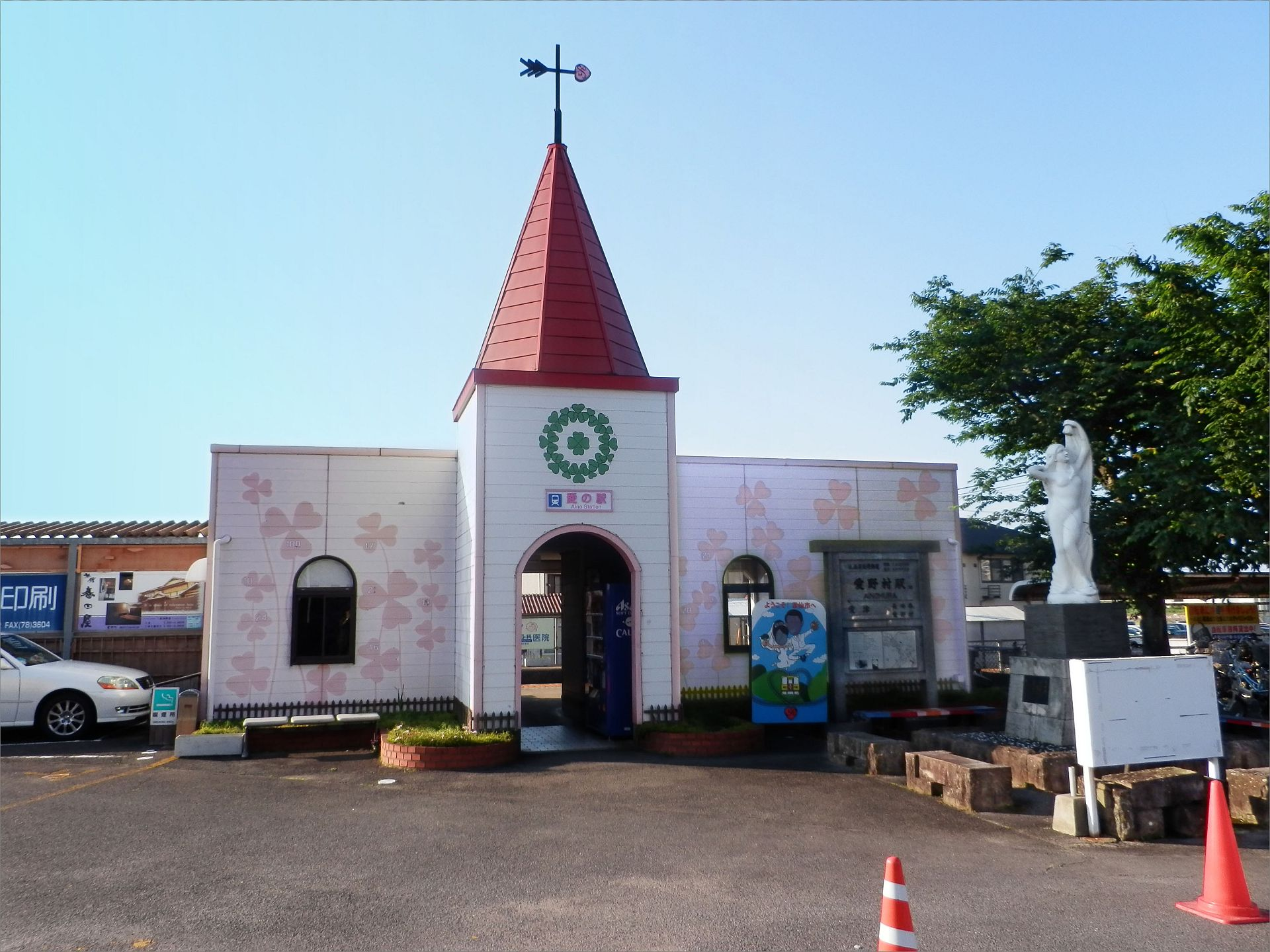
- Aino Station

General information
- Location: Ainomachiko, Unzen-shi, Nagasaki-ken 854-0301; Japan
- Coordinates: 32°49′8.18″N 130°9′21.71″E
- Operator: Shimabara Railway
- Line: ■ Shimabara Railway Line
- Distance: 12.4 km from Isahaya
- Platforms: 2 side platforms

Other information
- Status: Staffed
- Website: Official website

History
- Opened: 20 June 1911
- Former names: Ainomura (to 1960)

Passengers
- FY2018: 195 daily

Services
Preceding station	Shimabara Railway	Following station
Isahaya-higashi-kōkōmae towards Isahaya	Shimabara Railway Line	Abozaki towards Shimabarakō
Location
- Location within Nagasaki Prefecture Location within Japan

Aino Station (愛野駅, Aino-eki) is a passenger railway station in located in the city of Unzen, Nagasaki. It is operated by third-sector railway company Shimabara Railway.

== Lines ==
The station is served by the Shimabara Railway Line and is located 12.4 km from the starting point of the line at Isahaya.

== Station layout ==
The station is on the ground level with two opposing side platforms. The station building faces the south platform and has a church-like exterior with a cross on top. The building is equipped with a station office, waiting room, flush toilets, and vending machines. A covered waiting room is installed on the north platform.

=== Platforms ===
1	■ ■ Shimabara Railway Line	for Isahaya
2	■ ■Shimabara Railway Line	for Shimabara and Shimabarakō

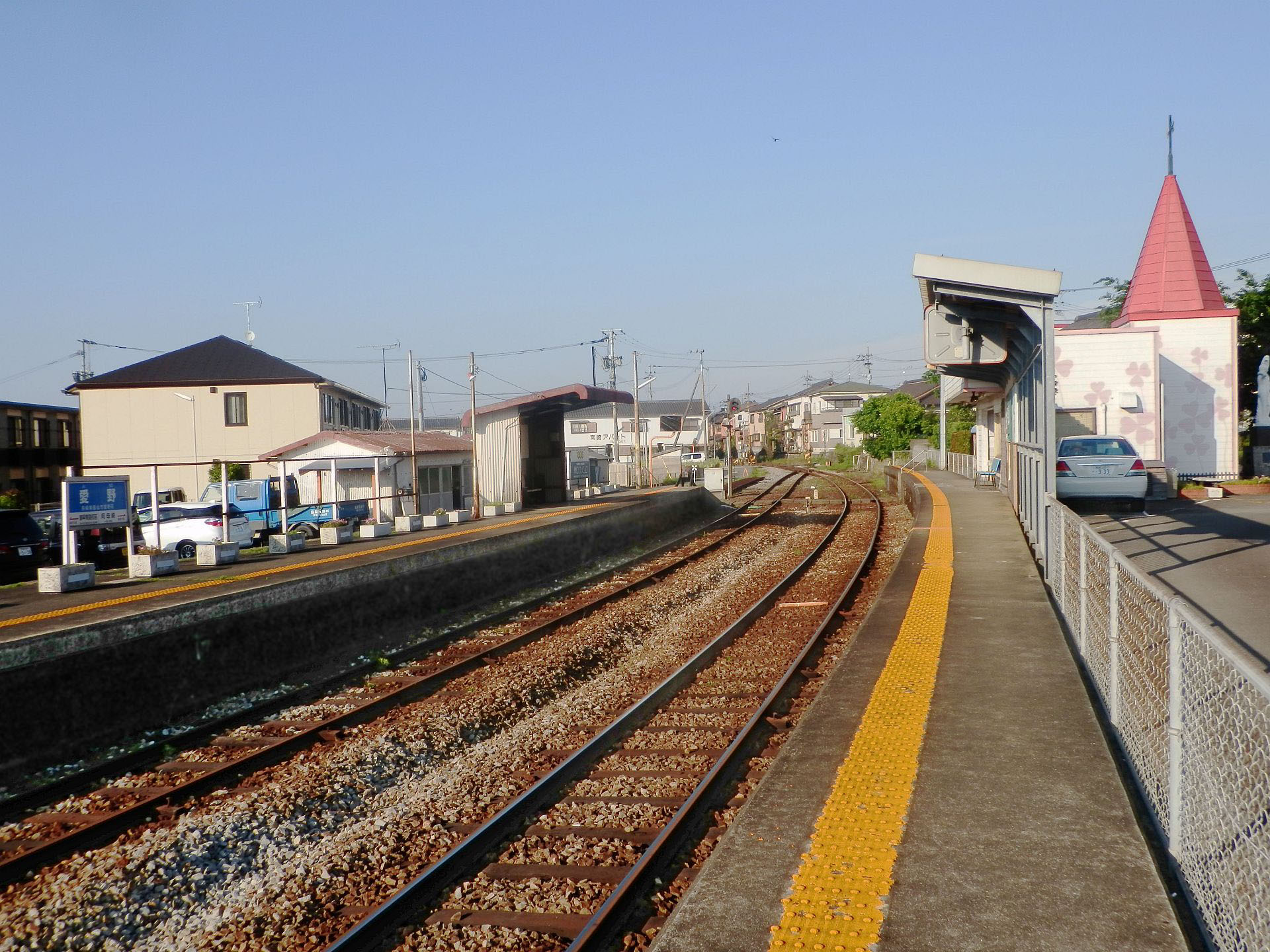
Platforms

== History ==
Aino Station was opened on 20 June 1911 as Ainomura Station (愛野村駅). The station was renamed on 5 November 1960. In September 1986 the existing station building was completed.

== Passenger statistics ==
In fiscal 2018, there were a total of 71,137 boarding passengers, given a daily average of 195 passengers.

== Surrounding area ==
- Unzen City Aino General Branch Office (formerly Aino Town Hall)
- Unzen City Aino Junior High School
- Unzen City Aino Elementary School

== See also ==
- List of railway stations in Japan
