= Public–private partnerships by country =

== Countries ==
=== Australia ===
A number of Australian state governments have adopted systematic programmes based on the Private Finance Initiative. The first, and the model for most others, is Partnerships Victoria. While some PPP projects have proceeded smoothly, others have been highly controversial. Australian examples include the Airport Link, the Cross City Tunnel, and the Sydney Harbour Tunnel, all in Sydney; the Southern Cross station redevelopment in Melbourne; and the Robina hospital in Queensland.

In the 2010s, the States of New South Wales, Queensland and Victoria implemented policies to encourage market-led proposals, where potential private partners can pitch PS projects for consideration by the government.

=== Bangladesh ===
In Bangladesh, the Infrastructure Investment Facilitation Center facilitates private sector investment. As a result of their efforts, the telecom sector has become a very active private investment area.

=== Canada ===
In Canada, public–private partnerships have become significant in both social and infrastructure development. PPP Canada Inc. was created as a Crown corporation with an independent board of directors reporting through the Minister of Finance to Parliament. Its mandate is to improve the delivery of public infrastructure by achieving better value, timeliness and accountability to taxpayers, through P3s. The Corporation became operational in February 2009 with the appointments of a chair of the board of directors and a chief executive officer.

PPPs exist in a variety of forms in British Columbia through the focused efforts of Partnerships BC, a company registered under the Business Corporations Act, that is wholly owned by the province of British Columbia and reports to its shareholder the Minister of Finance. Projects include the Canada Line rapid transit line, the Abbotsford Hospital and Cancer Centre and the Sea-to-Sky Highway project. In Quebec, PPPs include the McGill University Health Centre, the new western extension of Autoroute 30 and Université de Montréal's Hospital Research Center.

=== China ===
The PPP model has been adapted to China, where there were 9,575 PPP projects with a total value of 15 trillion RMB in the country as of May 2020. The Chinese government particularly promotes the use of PPP in infrastructure development. In the Chinese PPP model, many of the "private partners" are state-owned enterprises, often local government financing vehicles. PPP projects in China involving privately held "private partners" are typically comparatively small projects like sewage works or garbage facilities.

=== European Union ===
The European Commission sees Investments in public-sector infrastructure are seen as an important means of maintaining economic activity. As a result of this increase in the role played by PPPs in new public-sector infrastructure projects and the complexity of PPP contracts, the European PPP Expertise Centre (EPEC) was established to support the public sector's capacity to implement PPPs and help overcome problems common across Europe in PPPs.

From 1990 to 2009, nearly 1,400 PPP deals were signed in the European Union, representing a capital value of approximately €260 billion. On the onset of the financial crisis in 2008, estimates suggest that the number of PPP deals closed has fallen more than 40 percent that year.

A study, conducted by the European Court of Auditors of the European Union, examined 12 public-private partnerships in France, Greece, Ireland and Spain, in road transport and information and communications technology. It concluded that the partnerships were characterized by "widespread shortcomings and limited benefits" and underlined "considerable inefficiencies in the form of delays during construction and major cost increases".

==== Greece ====
The Greek Inter-Ministerial PPP Committee authorized two Public-Private Partnership projects in September 2017 and October 2018, including eight schools in the Cretan Municipality of Chania and 13 schools on the island of Rhodes.

==== Netherlands ====
The Netherlands Financial Sector Development Exchange (NFX) is a platform of ING, Rabobank, ABN AMRO, Fortis, Triodos Bank, FMO (Dutch development bank) and the Dutch Ministries of Foreign Affairs, Economic Affairs and Finance to stimulate financial sector development in developing countries and emerging markets.

==== Poland ====
In July 2017, the Polish Council of Ministers approved the Policy for the Development of Public-Private Partnerships. In 2019, the Ministry offered public authorities with information and guidance on public-private partnerships. Poland is developing PPP Guidelines, following the path of the UK and other nations burdened by PPPs. In September 2018, the first installment on PPP Project Preparation was released.

==== Spain ====
In his paper on P3s in Spain, José Francisco Bellod Redondo notes that one of the main drivers for PFI in Spain is compliance with the fiscal restrictions imposed under the Maastricht Treaty and Stability and Growth Pact, which set concrete limits to the national debt. Examples of PFI projects in Spain include Parque de Valdebebas in Madrid, Ciutat de la Justicia in Barcelona, the Autovia de Noroeste in Murcia, and the Hospital Puerta de Hierro in Majadahonda.

=== India ===
The Government of India defines a P3 as "a partnership between a public sector entity (sponsoring authority) and a private sector entity (a legal entity in which 51% or more of equity is with the private partner/s) for the creation and/or management of infrastructure for public purpose for a specified period of time (concession period) on commercial terms and in which the private partner has been procured through a transparent and open procurement system."

The union government has estimated an investment of $320 billion in infrastructure in the 10th plan. The major infrastructure development projects in the Indian state of Maharashtra (more than 50%) are based on the P3 model. In the 2000s, other states such as Karnataka, Madhya Pradesh, Gujarat and Tamil Nadu also adopted this model. Sector-wise, road projects account for about 53.4% of the total projects in numbers, and 46% in terms of value. Ports come in second place and account for 8% of the total projects (21% of the total value). Other sectors including power, irrigation, telecommunication, water supply and airports, have gained momentum through the P3 model. As of 2011, these sectors were expected to get an investment of Rs. 2,027,169 crore (according to 2006–2007 WPI). Recent failures of the major PPPs in India, such as the Tata Mundra Ultra Mega Power Project and the Khandwa Water Supply Augmentation Project, are now questioning the ability of PPPs to deliver on the Sustainable Development Goals.

In India, public–private partnerships have been extremely successful in developing infrastructure, particularly road assets under the National Highways Authority of India and Midday Meal Scheme with Akshaya Patra Foundation.

=== Israel ===
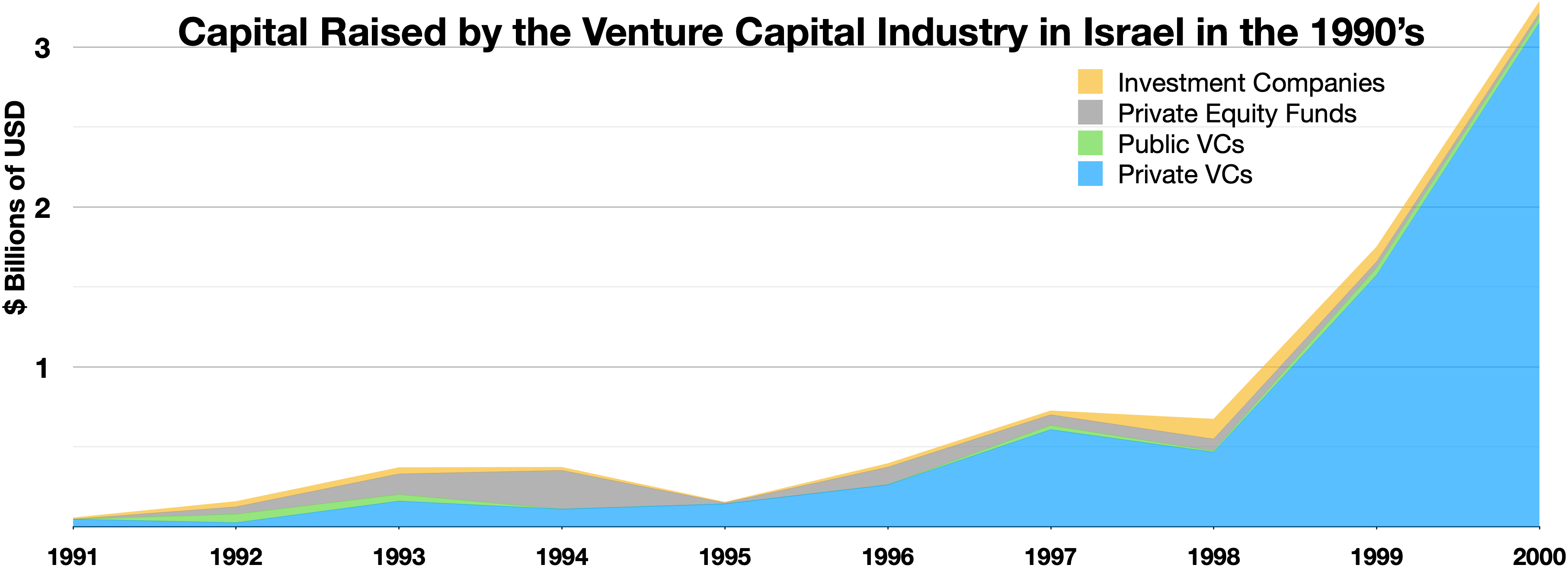
Capital raised by year in the venture capital industry in Israel during the 1990’s, ~$8 billion raised total.

The Yozma Program that started in Israel in 1993 kick-started the venture capital scene with public incentives, Israel is now know as the Start-up Nation.

=== Japan ===
In Japan since the 1980s, the third sector (第三セクター, daisan sekutā) refers to joint corporations invested in by both public and private sectors.

In rail transport terms, a third-sector railway line is a short line or network of lines operated by a small operating company jointly owned by a prefectural/municipal government and smaller private interests. Third-sector lines are generally former JR Group – or, before 1987, Japanese National Railways (JNR) – lines that have been divested from those larger companies.

Most third-sector railway lines in Japan, especially those located in rural areas, operate in a somewhat similar fashion to that of community rail in the United Kingdom.

=== Pakistan ===
The PPP model developed in Pakistan is built around this approach, structured to provide a parallel alternatives to traditional healthcare using corporate infrastructures which has been packaged as corporate social responsibility.

=== Philippines ===
The Philippine Government (Filipino Pag tutulungan ng Pampubliko – at Pribadong Sektor) maintains an online list of PPP projects. Wikipedia articles on specific PPP projects in the Philippines are categorized into Category:Proposed infrastructure in the Philippines.

The Philippine BOT Law, Republic Act No. 6957 has been passed on May 5, 1994, and had been subsequently amended by RA 7718 with the Revised 2022 IRR of the BOT Law in 2012.

On December 5, 2023, President Bongbong Marcos signed Republic Act 11966 or the PPP Code of the Philippines. The PPP Code of the Philippines incorporates the best practices and lessons learned from over 33 years of experience in implementing PPPs in the country to ensure that present and future PPP projects are of high quality and can mitigate risks during implementation. The PPP Code of the Philippines also strengthens and institutionalizes PPPs in the country with a unified legal framework for both at the national and local levels by streamlining requirements, procedures, and regulatory approvals to create a more stable policy environment for all PPP projects; clarifying ambiguities in the existing BOT Law; reducing transaction costs with predictable tariff regime that safeguards public interests; and improving ease of doing business for PPPs.

On March 21, 2024, the implementing rules and regulations was signed by Government officials led by Arsenio Balisacan at The Mega Tower, Mandaluyong. "This pivotal moment underscores the Marcos administration's commitment to its Build Better More program of building and realizing high-quality, game-changing infrastructure projects that enable socioeconomic transformation," Balisacan said. "The PPP Code and its IRR aim to strengthen and institutionalize PPPs in the country by providing a unified legal framework for all PPPs at both national and local levels," he explained. It clarifies the ambiguities in the Build–operate–transfer Law, last amended in 1994, and other existing PPP legal frameworks.

=== Russia ===
Nowadays there are special laws about PPP in 69 subjects of Russian Federation. But the biggest part of them are just declarations. Besides PPP in Russia is also regulated by Federal Law #115-FZ (21.07.2005) "On concessional agreements" and Federal Law #94-FZ (21.07.2005) "On Procurement of Goods, Works and Services for State and Municipal Needs". In some ways PPP is also regulated by Federal Law No.116-FZ (22.07.2005) "On special economic zones" (in terms of providing business benefits on special territories – in the broadest sense it is a variation of PPP).

Still all those laws and documents do not cover all possible PPP forms.

In February 2013 experts rated subjects of Russian Federation according to their preparedness for implementing projects via public–private partnership. The most developed region was Saint Petersburg (with rating 7.8), the least Chukotka (rating 0.0).

By 2013 there were almost 300 public–private partnership projects in Russia.

=== United Kingdom ===
In 1992, the Conservative government of John Major in the UK introduced the PFI, the first systematic program aimed at encouraging public-private partnerships. The 1992 program focused on reducing the public-sector borrowing requirement, although, as already noted, the effect on public accounts was largely illusory. The Labour government of Tony Blair, elected in 1997, expanded the PFI initiative but sought to shift the emphasis to the achievement of "value for money", mainly through an appropriate allocation of risk. However, it has since been found that many programs ran dramatically over budget and have not provided value for money for the taxpayer, with some projects costing more to cancel than to complete. An in-depth study conducted by the National Audit Office of the United Kingdom concluded that the private finance initiative model had proved to be more expensive and less efficient in supporting hospitals, schools, and other public infrastructure than public financing.

In the UK, two-thirds of the London Underground PPP was taken back into public control in July 2007 after only four and a half years at an estimated cost of £2 billion and the remaining one-third was taken back into public control in May 2010 after seven and a half years for a purchase price of £310 million. The government had paid advisers £180 million for structuring, negotiating and implementing the PPP and had reimbursed £275 million of bid costs to the winning bidders. The 30-year PPP contract for the refurbishment of the Ministry of Defence Main Building in London was estimated to give a saving of £100,000 as compared to the £746.2 million cost of public procurement. The refinancing of the Fazakerley Prison PFI contract following the completion of construction delivered an 81% gain to the private sector operator. The NATS PPP saw 51% of the UK's air traffic control service transferred to the private sector; however, following the decline in air traffic after the September 11 attacks, the government and BAA Limited each invested £65 million in the private sector operator in 2003.

=== United States ===
Public-private partnerships in America have existed in one form of another since the beginning of the colonial period, as colonial charters were based on a partnership between the British Crown and a company responsible for colonisation. In the United States, they mostly took the form of toll roads concessions, which emerged in the mid to late nineteenth century.

In recent years, there has been interest in expanding P3s to multiple infrastructure projects, such as schools, universities, government buildings, waste and water. In the early 2000s, P3s were implemented sporadically by different States and municipalities with little federal guidance. However, during Obama's second term, multiple policies were adopted to facilitate P3 projects, and Congress passed bills in that direction with overwhelming bipartisan support.

=== Vietnam ===
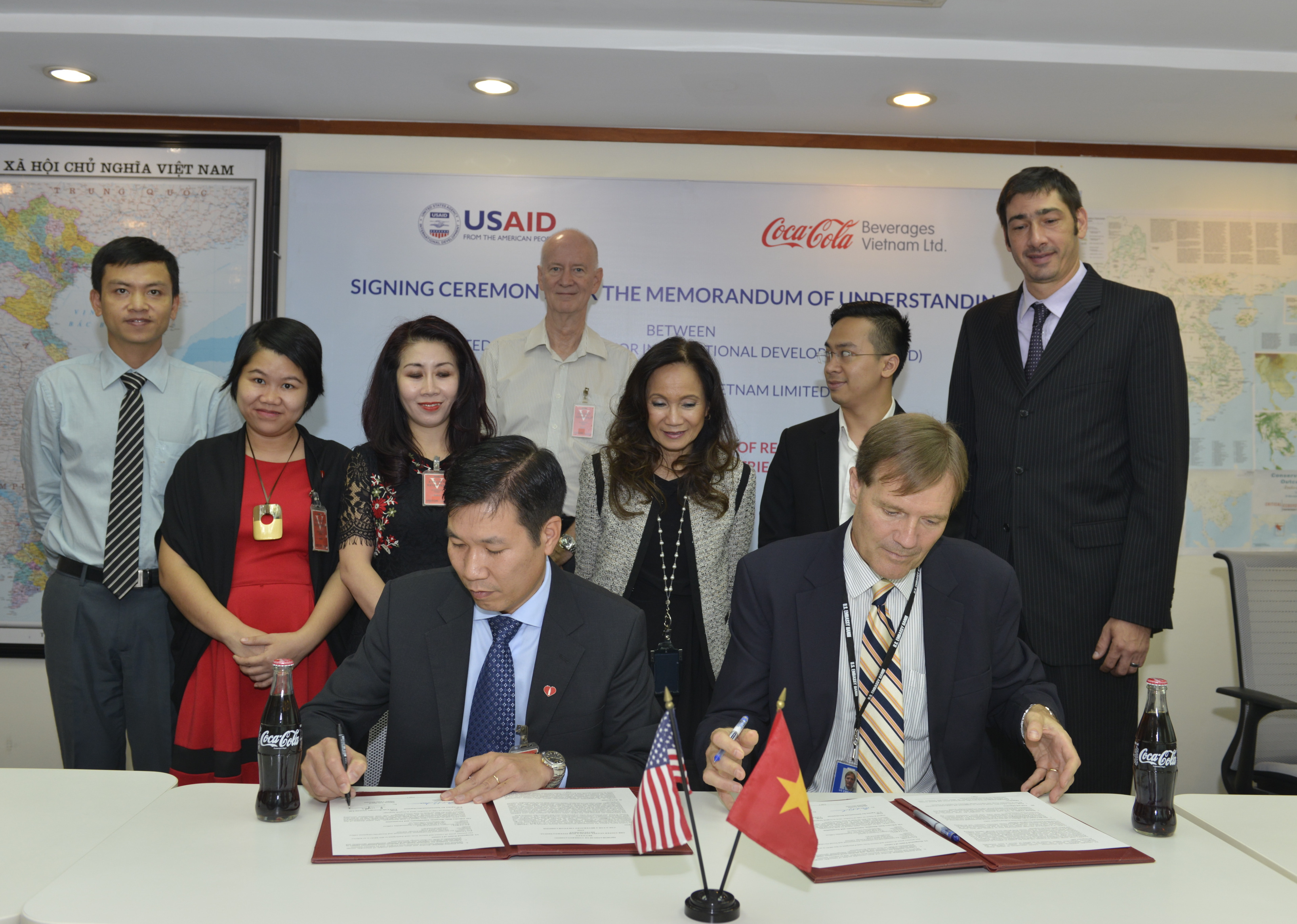
USAID and Coca-Cola Public-Private Partnership to Boost Renewable Energy and Energy Efficiency in Vietnam

P3s were introduced in Vietnam in 2010, with the goal of attracting private investments for the country's infrastructure projects. This development was encouraged by the World Bank. By 2016, Vietnam had introduced 101 P3 projects, totaling $18.5 billion. In 2019, Vietnam adopted its first P3 law, which was drafted in collaboration with the United States Agency for International Development (USAID).

== PPP units by country ==
Country	Territory	PPP unit	Duration
Australia	New South Wales	NSW Public–private partnerships	
Australia	Queensland	Projects Queensland	
Australia	(Victoria (state)) Victoria	Partnerships Victoria	1999–present
Bangladesh	National	Infrastructure Investment Facilitation Center	1999–present
Bangladesh	National	Public–Private Partnership Authority	2010–present
Belgium	Flanders	Flemish PPP Knowledge Center	
Belgium	Wallonia	Financial Information Cell	
Brazil	Federal	PPP Unit	
Brazil	Bahia	PPP Unit	
Brazil	Espírito Santo	PPP Unit	
Brazil	Minas Gerais	PPP Unit	
Brazil	Pernambuco	PPP Unit	
Brazil	(São Paulo (state)) São Paulo	PPP Unit	
Brazil	Rio Grande do Sul	PPP Unit	
Canada	Federal	PPP Canada	2009–2018
Canada	British Columbia	Partnerships BC	2002–present
Canada	New Brunswick	Partnerships New Brunswick	
Canada	Ontario	Infrastructure Ontario	2005–present
Canada	Quebec	Quebec Agency for Public–Private Partnerships	2004–2009
Canada	Saskatchewan	Saskbuilds	2012–present
China	National	Public–private partnerships Center	
China	Hong Kong	Hong Kong Efficiency Unit	
Croatia	National	Agency for Public–Private Partnerships	
Czech Republic	National	PPP Association	
Denmark	National	Danish Business Authority	
Egypt	National	PPP Central Unit	
Estonia	National	Public Procurement Center	
France	National	Mission d'Appui aux Partenariats Public–Privés	2004–2017
Germany	Lower Saxony	PPP Task Force	
Germany	North Rhine-Westphalia	PPP Task Force	
Ghana	National	PPP Advisory Units	
Greece	National	Secret Secretariat for PPPs	
Honduras	National	Commission for the Promotion of Public–Private Partnerships	
Hungary	National	Hungary Central PPP Unit	2003–present
(Republic of Ireland) Ireland	National	Central PPP Policy Unit	
Israel	National	PPP Unit (Ministry of Finance)	
India	Federal	Department of Economic Affairs PPP Cell	2006–present
India	Andhra Pradesh	Urban Finance and Infrastructure	
India	Assam	Assam PPP	
India	Bihar	Infrastructure Development Authority	
India	Karnataka	Infrastructure Development Department	
India	Maharashtra	Region Development Authority	
India	Odisha	PPP Unit	
India	Punjab	Infrastructure Development Board	
India	Uttarakhand	PPP cell	
Indonesia	Federal	Indonesia Infrastructure Guarantee Fund	
Indonesia	Federal	PPP Directorate of Bappenas	
Italy	National	Project Finance technical unit	
Jamaica	National	National Investment Bank of Jamaica	1980–present
Japan	National	PFI Promotion Office	
Kazakhstan	National	Kazakhstan PPP Center	
Kenya	National	PPP Unit	
Kosovo	National	Partnership Kosovo	
Kuwait	National	Partnerships Technical Bureau	
Latvia	National	Central Finance and Contracting Agency	
Lebanon	National	Higher Council for Privatization and Partnerships	
Malawi	National	Public Private Partnership Commission	
Malaysia	National	PPP Unit	
Mauritius	National	PPP Unit	
Mexico	Federal + Regional	Program for the Promotion of Public–Private Partnerships in Mexican States	2007–present
Namibia	National	PPP Unit	
Nigeria	National	Infrastructure Concession Regulatory Commission	
New Zealand	National	National Infrastructure Unit	
Pakistan	Federal	Private Power Infrastructure Board	
Pakistan	Federal	Infrastructure Project Development Facility	
Pakistan	(Punjab, Pakistan) Punjab	PPP Cell	
Pakistan	Sindh	PPP Unit	
Peru	National	ProInversion	
Philippines	National	Public-Private Partnership Center (PPP Center)	1999–present
Poland	National	The department for PPP in the Ministry of Funds and Regional Policy	
Portugal	National	Project Monitoring Technical Unit	2012–present
Russia	Federal	PPP Development Center	
Senegal	National	Agence nationale chargée de la promotion des investissements et des grands travaux	
Senegal	National	Unité Nationale d'Appui aux Partenariats Public–Privés	
Serbia	National	Commission for Public Private Partnerships	
South Africa	Federal	South African Treasury PPP Unit	2000–present
South Korea	National	Private Infrastructure Investment Management Centre	2005–present
Sri Lanka	National	Utilities Commission of Sri Lanka, Board of Investment	
Uganda	National	PPP Unit (MoFPED)	
United Arab Emirates	(Emirate of Dubai) Dubai	PPP Unit	2015–present
United Kingdom	National	Treasury Task Force for PPP	1997–1998
United Kingdom	National	Partnerships UK	1998–2011
United Kingdom	National	Local Partnerships	2009–present
United Kingdom	Northern Ireland	Strategic Investment Board	
United Kingdom	Scotland	Scottish Futures Trust	2008–present
United States	Puerto Rico	PPP Authority	
Uruguay	National	Public–Private Participation Unit	2009–present

Source: World Bank
