= Sabia =

Sabia may refer to:

== People ==
- Donato Sabia (1963–2020), runner
- Eli Sabia (born 1988), footballer
- Laura Sabia (1916–1996), social activist
- Michael Sabia (born 1953), executive
- Joe Sabia, digital remix artist
- Vilmar da Cunha Rodrigues (born 1982), also known as Sabia, Brazilian footballer

== Music ==
- "Sabiá" (song), also known as "The Song of the Sabiá", a song by Antônio Carlos Jobim and Chico Buarque

== Science ==
- Sabia (gastropod), a genus of hoof snails
- Sabia (plant), a genus of flowering plant
- Mimosa caesalpiniifolia, also known as sabiá, a tree native to Brazil
- Sabiá virus, the cause of Brazilian hemorrhagic fever
