= Public–private partnership unit =

A Public–private partnership unit (PPP unit) is an organisation responsible for promoting, facilitating and/or assessing Public-private partnerships (PPP, P3, 3P) in their territory. PPP units can be government agencies, or semi-independent organizations created with full or partial government support. Governments tend to create a PPP unit as a response to prior criticisms of the implementation of P3 projects in their country. In 2009, 50% of OECD countries had created a centralized PPP unit, and many more of these institutions exist in other countries.

== Definition ==
There is no widely accepted definition of what a PPP unit is. The World Bank defines a PPP Unit as an organization that “promotes or improves PPPs. It may manage the number and quality of PPPs by trying to attract more PPPs or trying to ensure that the PPPs meet specific quality criteria such as affordability, value for money, and appropriate risk transfer.” Heather Whiteside describes them as "quasi-independent" institutions operating at "arm's length" from the government, and "created to promote, evaluate and develop P3 projects and policies."

== Overview ==
Different governments have encountered different institutional challenges in the PPP procurement process which justified the creation of a PPP Unit. Hence, these centralized PPP units need to address these issues by shaping their functions to suit their government's needs. The function, location (within government), and jurisdiction (i.e., who controls it) of dedicated PPP units may differ among countries, but generally, they include:

- Policy guidance and advice on the content of national legislation. The guidance also includes defining which sectors are eligible for PPPs, as well as which PPP methods and schemes can be carried out.
- Approving or rejecting proposed PPP projects (e.g., playing a gatekeeper role at any stage of the process, such as the initial planning or final approval stage).
- Providing technical support to government organizations at the project identification, evaluation, procurement, or contract-management phase.
- Capacity building (e.g., training of public-sector officials that are involved in PPP programs or interested in the PPP process).
- Promoting PPPs within the private sector (e.g., PPP market development).

The United Kingdom's PPP units, the Treasury Task Force on PPP (1997) and later Partnerships UK (1998) were staffed with people linked with the City of London, and accountancy and consultancy firms who had a vested interest in the success of the country's PPP policy: Private Finance Initiative. This helped the government override the public sector's opposition to expanding P3s. These institutions played a central role in establishing P3s as the "new normal" for public infrastructure procurements in the country. In contrast, the Infrastructure Investment Facilitation Center (1999) suffered from a lack of formal or informal power, and so was involved in less than half of the 3P projects developed in the country.

== Effectiveness ==
A 2013 review of research into the value of centralized PPP units (and not looking at the value of PPPs in general or any other type of PPP arrangement, as it was aimed at providing evidence needed to decide whether or not to set up a centralized PPP unit) found:

- No quantitative evidence: There is very little quantitative evidence of the value of centralized PPP coordination units vis-à-vis ministries or government agencies individually procuring PPP projects. Most of the studies conducted on PPP units focus on their role and carry out only brief descriptive analyses of their value.
- Limited authority: The majority of the PPP units reviewed in the literature do not play a particularly important role in approving or rejecting PPP programs or projects. While their advice is used in the decision-making process by other government bodies, the majority do not actually have any executive power to make such decisions themselves. Hence, when they have more authority, their value is seen to be higher.
- PPP units differ by country and sector: Government failures, in regards to PPP units, vary by government. The requirements for PPPs also vary by country and sector, as do the risks involved (financial, social, etc.) for the country government. Hence, PPP units need to be tailored to solve these failures and properly assess risks and need to be located in the correct government departments, where they can command the most power. PPP units can play a number of important roles in the PPP process, but not all such units will play the same role, as their functions have been tailored to the individual country's needs. In some cases, limits on their authority have curtailed their effectiveness.
- Implicit value: The lack of rigorous evidence does not prove that PPP units are not an important contributor to the success of a country's PPP program. The literature review does show that while there is no quantitative data to this effect, there are widespread perceptions about the importance of a well-functioning PPP unit for the success of a country's PPP program.

The author of the 2013 review found no literature that rigorously evaluates the usefulness of PPP units. The literature does show that PPP units should be individually tailored to different government functions, address different government failures, and be appropriately positioned to support the country's PPP program. Where these conditions seem to have been met, there is a consensus that PPP units have played a positive role in national PPP programs.

== Criticism ==
Centralized PPP units have been criticized for structuring their project assessments with a bias in favor of PPPs over traditional procurement methods, especially if Promoting PPPs as part of their mandate. As P3 units are usually staffed with people linked with private financial, consultancy and accountancy firms who have a vested interest in the success of P3 policies, this creates an apparent conflict of interest.

Some PPP units have been criticized for paying their executive staff well above the public sector's standard pay rate, which was deemed necessary for enticing people with financial experience to work for them.

Some have questioned the usefulness of creating P3 units, as everything in their mandate could theoretically be accomplished by the government ministry responsible for public infrastructure.

== List of PPP Units ==
Country	Territory	PPP unit	Duration
Australia	New South Wales	NSW Public–private partnerships	
Australia	Queensland	Projects Queensland	
Australia	(Victoria (state)) Victoria	Partnerships Victoria	1999–present
Bangladesh	National	Infrastructure Investment Facilitation Center	1999–present
Bangladesh	National	Public–Private Partnership Authority	2010–present
Belgium	Flanders	Flemish PPP Knowledge Center	
Belgium	Wallonia	Financial Information Cell	
Brazil	Federal	PPP Unit	
Brazil	Bahia	PPP Unit	
Brazil	Espírito Santo	PPP Unit	
Brazil	Minas Gerais	PPP Unit	
Brazil	Pernambuco	PPP Unit	
Brazil	(São Paulo (state)) São Paulo	PPP Unit	
Brazil	Rio Grande do Sul	PPP Unit	
Canada	Federal	PPP Canada	2009–2018
Canada	British Columbia	Partnerships BC	2002–present
Canada	New Brunswick	Partnerships New Brunswick	
Canada	Ontario	Infrastructure Ontario	2005–present
Canada	Quebec	Quebec Agency for Public–Private Partnerships	2004–2009
Canada	Saskatchewan	Saskbuilds	2012–present
China	National	Public–private partnerships Center	
China	Hong Kong	Hong Kong Efficiency Unit	
Croatia	National	Agency for Public–Private Partnerships	
Czech Republic	National	PPP Association	
Denmark	National	Danish Business Authority	
Egypt	National	PPP Central Unit	
Estonia	National	Public Procurement Center	
France	National	Mission d'Appui aux Partenariats Public–Privés	2004–2017
Germany	Lower Saxony	PPP Task Force	
Germany	North Rhine-Westphalia	PPP Task Force	
Ghana	National	PPP Advisory Units	
Greece	National	Secret Secretariat for PPPs	
Honduras	National	Commission for the Promotion of Public–Private Partnerships	
Hungary	National	Hungary Central PPP Unit	2003–present
(Republic of Ireland) Ireland	National	Central PPP Policy Unit	
Israel	National	PPP Unit (Ministry of Finance)	
India	Federal	Department of Economic Affairs PPP Cell	2006–present
India	Andhra Pradesh	Urban Finance and Infrastructure	
India	Assam	Assam PPP	
India	Bihar	Infrastructure Development Authority	
India	Karnataka	Infrastructure Development Department	
India	Maharashtra	Region Development Authority	
India	Odisha	PPP Unit	
India	Punjab	Infrastructure Development Board	
India	Uttarakhand	PPP cell	
Indonesia	Federal	Indonesia Infrastructure Guarantee Fund	
Indonesia	Federal	PPP Directorate of Bappenas	
Italy	National	Project Finance technical unit	
Jamaica	National	National Investment Bank of Jamaica	1980–present
Japan	National	PFI Promotion Office	
Kazakhstan	National	Kazakhstan PPP Center	
Kenya	National	PPP Unit	
Kosovo	National	Partnership Kosovo	
Kuwait	National	Partnerships Technical Bureau	
Latvia	National	Central Finance and Contracting Agency	
Lebanon	National	Higher Council for Privatization and Partnerships	
Malawi	National	Public Private Partnership Commission	
Malaysia	National	PPP Unit	
Mauritius	National	PPP Unit	
Mexico	Federal + Regional	Program for the Promotion of Public–Private Partnerships in Mexican States	2007–present
Namibia	National	PPP Unit	
Nigeria	National	Infrastructure Concession Regulatory Commission	
New Zealand	National	National Infrastructure Unit	
Pakistan	Federal	Private Power Infrastructure Board	
Pakistan	Federal	Infrastructure Project Development Facility	
Pakistan	(Punjab, Pakistan) Punjab	PPP Cell	
Pakistan	Sindh	PPP Unit	
Peru	National	ProInversion	
Philippines	National	Public-Private Partnership Center (PPP Center)	1999–present
Poland	National	The department for PPP in the Ministry of Funds and Regional Policy	
Portugal	National	Project Monitoring Technical Unit	2012–present
Russia	Federal	PPP Development Center	
Senegal	National	Agence nationale chargée de la promotion des investissements et des grands travaux	
Senegal	National	Unité Nationale d'Appui aux Partenariats Public–Privés	
Serbia	National	Commission for Public Private Partnerships	
South Africa	Federal	South African Treasury PPP Unit	2000–present
South Korea	National	Private Infrastructure Investment Management Centre	2005–present
Sri Lanka	National	Utilities Commission of Sri Lanka, Board of Investment	
Uganda	National	PPP Unit (MoFPED)	
United Arab Emirates	(Emirate of Dubai) Dubai	PPP Unit	2015–present
United Kingdom	National	Treasury Task Force for PPP	1997–1998
United Kingdom	National	Partnerships UK	1998–2011
United Kingdom	National	Local Partnerships	2009–present
United Kingdom	Northern Ireland	Strategic Investment Board	
United Kingdom	Scotland	Scottish Futures Trust	2008–present
United States	Puerto Rico	PPP Authority	
Uruguay	National	Public–Private Participation Unit	2009–present

Source: World Bank

== See also ==
- Public-private partnerships by country
- Public-private partnerships in Canada
- Public-private partnerships in India
- Public-private partnerships in the United States
- Public–private partnership in transition economies
- Privatization
