= Canada Infrastructure Bank =

Federal Crown Corporation of Canada

- Native name: Banque de l'infrastructure du Canada
- Company type: Crown corporation
- Industry: Public Private Partnership - Infrastructure
- Founded: June 22, 2017; 8 years ago
- Headquarters: Canada
- Key people: Ehren Cory (CEO); Gregor Robertson (minister responsible)
- Total assets: CA$17,663,062,000 (December 31, 2025)
- Owner: Government of Canada
- Number of employees: 149 (March 2025)
- Website: cib-bic.ca

The Canada Infrastructure Bank (CIB; French: Banque de l'infrastructure du Canada) is a federal Crown Corporation of Canada tasked with financially supporting revenue-generating infrastructure projects that are "in the public interest" by catalyzing private investment through methods such as direct investment and public-private partnerships.

The bank was set up in coordination with equity investors such as BlackRock and Canada's largest pension funds. The CIB was officially established in June 2017. Its inaugural chairperson was former Royal Bank of Canada CAO and CFO Janice Fukakusa. The CIB functionally replaced PPP Canada, which was dismantled in 2018.

The CIB's stated purpose is to support the government of Canada's official infrastructure priorities, such as investing in public transit, trade and transportation, and green infrastructure.

The bank's role and operations have been criticized by a wide variety of associations, scholars, and opposition parties from its early beginnings. Critics have decried the CIB's lack of transparency, poor efficiency, and high costs. In May 2022, the House of Commons transport committee recommended that the bank be abolished.

== History ==
The Canada Infrastructure Bank was announced by the Finance Minister, Bill Morneau, during the 2016 fall economic update. This was based on a campaign promise made by the Liberal Party during the 2015 Canadian federal election. The bank was officially established in June 2017, when the Canada Infrastructure Bank Act received royal assent. The bank's website previously stated that it "was established in response to a market gap between government-funded and privately funded infrastructure projects". Some speculated that the bank's creation was a way for the government to sidestep the Committee on Monetary and Economic Reform's lawsuit.

A Canadian investment banker working for Bank of America Merrill Lynch helped design and set up the Canada Infrastructure Bank. In November 2016, the government held high-level meetings concerning the bank's structure behind closed doors with private consultants from McKinsey, major equity investors such as BlackRock, and Canada's largest pension funds.

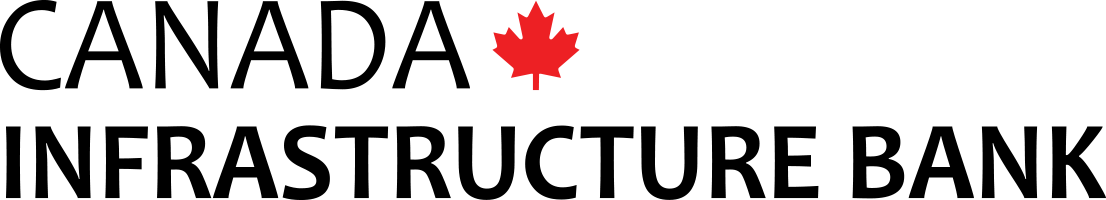
First logo of the Canada Infrastructure Bank, used from July 2017 to January 2021

The creation of the Canada Infrastructure Bank coincides with the dissolution of PPP Canada and the PPP Canada fund, which were created under Prime Minister Stephen Harper to fund infrastructure projects using public-private partnerships.

Janice Fukakusa was appointed as the CIB's inaugural chairperson of the board of directors in July 2017. She was joined in May 2018 by Pierre Lavallée, the CIB's first president, chief financial officer (CFO), and chief executive officer (CEO).

The first few years of the bank's existence were mired in controversy related to the fact that some of its main projects would be funded mainly by user fees. Both the Conservative Party and the New Democratic Party vowed to wind down the bank if elected. Amid widespread criticism of the bank's operations, both Fukakusa and Lavalée resigned from their positions in April 2020. Upon his resignation, Lavallée was awarded a bonus worth $720,000, or 120% of his annual salary. In October 2020, he was replaced by former McKinsey & Company partner Ehren Cory.

In January 2021, Tamara Vrooman was selected as the new chair of the bank. In July, Vrooman reported that the CIB "has funded and financed about $13.9 billion in projects, over 70 per cent of those in the last six months alone, with almost 70 per cent of that financing coming from the private sector."

The House of Commons transport committee oversaw a review of the bank, and held hearing on its operation in 2021. In May 2022, the committee released a report based on these findings with one recommendation: "That the Government of Canada abolish the Canada Infrastructure Bank".

== Mandate ==
The 2017 Canada Infrastructure Bank Act sets out the corporation's mandate to invest, and seek to attract investment from private-sector investors and institutional investors, in revenue-generating infrastructure projects that are "in the public interest".

The CIB uses financial instruments including loans, equity, and, where appropriate, loan guarantees to deliver federal support to projects to make them commercially viable. The CIB provides financing and investment using a combination of these instruments depending on a project's characteristics. The model is to use private and institutional capital to finance projects up front, while the public sector and users fund the private return on investment over time.

The Government of Canada sets the high-level policy priorities for the CIB, which include projects that:

- support the government's current priorities to invest in public transit, trade and transportation, and green infrastructure;
- contribute to the objectives of the Investing in Canada Plan and the Pan-Canadian Framework on Clean Growth and Climate Change; and
- are generally eligible for cost sharing under federal infrastructure support programs.

Consideration is given to potential projects appropriate for the new partnership- and revenue-based funding model.

The CIB reports to Parliament through the Minister of Infrastructure and Communities.

== Funding ==
The Canadian Parliament has authorized appropriations of $CDN35 billion covering the 11-year period that ends in fiscal year 2027–2028. This includes $CDN15 billion for the fiscal framework. This financial support is not earmarked for projects directly, but to "mobilize private investment" in projects that would otherwise have no private investment. This may be in the form of "financial instruments" or "loans, equity investments, and loan guarantees."

=== User fees ===
CIB projects are paid for through user fees. In a September 2017 keynote address to the Canadian council for public-private partnerships, CIV chair Janice Fukakusa affirmed that infrastructure projects financed through the CIB would be outside the public balance sheet. She then stated that projects could generate revenues "in many different forms, including fees, tolls, fares, tariffs, and mechanisms based on appreciating land value". In a 2018 interview with B2B magazine IPE Real Assets, CIB CEO Pierre Lavallée clarified that "when it is operational, users will fund the bulk of the operations".

=== Public–private partnerships ===
Since its inception, the CIB has promoted public-private partnerships for infrastructure procurement. In July 2022, six months after becoming chairperson of the CIB, Tamara Vrooman told the Toronto Region Board of Trade that she was a "big fan of public-private partnerships".

Public-private partnerships are generally more expensive than publicly financed projects. This is in part due to the use of private-sector financing, which comes at a higher interest rate than public financing. The CIB subsidizes this higher borrowing cost, making CIB projects more profitable for the private partners but more expensive for taxpayers and/or users. The bank also charges local governments for their services.

== Governance ==
The bank's chair is a Governor in Council appointment made of the advice of the minister of infrastructure and communities. Tamara Vrooman was appointed chair on January 27, 2021. Ehren Cory is the bank's chief executive officer and president, and Annie Ropar is the CIB's chief administrative officer (CAO) and chief financial officer (CFO).

Most of the board members are investors who have had careers in major banks or pension funds. More than half of members have ties to the Liberal Party, including former Calgary mayor and past Liberal donor Dave Bronconnier.

Political scientist Heather Whiteside predicted that the board of director's private-sector majority would mostly be concerned with projects' profitability and would disregard the government's other infrastructure priorities. Indeed, in its 2022 report of the bank's operations, the House of Commons transport committee expressed concerns about the bank's decisions on which projects to fund. The report noted that many citizens believed that it did not align with the needs of their community.

=== Oversight ===
The bank is not subject to the Government of Canada's strong accountability and transparency rules, and the Auditor General of Canada has limited oversight over the bank and its projects. Under Ehren Cory, the bank streamlined its approval process. From 2021 onwards, the federal government stopped reviewing individual projects and began approving CIB investments by sector.

In January 2020, following numerous criticism of the bank's operations, the House of Commons commissioned an audit of federal infrastructure projects (worth over $186.7 billion) and a complete review of the bank.

The Parliamentary Budget Office (PBO) reviewed the CIB's announcements as of April 2021, and compared them with the track records of similar institutions. It concluded that the CIB is likely to spend only $16 billion of its $35 billion total budget over the course of its 11-year mandate.

In March 2021, the Canadian House of Commons Standing Committee on Transport, Infrastructure and Communities unanimously requested that the CIB provide the committee with "all documents detailing the bonus policies and payment of bonuses to executives and the board of directors since the bank's inception". The bank's 157-page response to this request did not include the details of its executive bonuses, citing "competitive and privacy considerations". Opposition members of the committee strongly criticized the bank for this omission.

=== Leadership history ===
Chairperson

1. Janice Fukakusa (July 2017–April 2020)
2. Michael Sabia (April 2020–January 2021)
3. Tamara Vrooman (January 2021 – January 2024)
4. Jane Bird (interim) (January 2024 – present)

CEO

1. Pierre Lavallée (May 2018–April 2020)
2. Annie Ropar (Interim) (April 2020–October 2020)
3. Ehren Cory (October 2020 – present)

== Reception ==
Since its inception, the bank has received sharp criticism from public-sector unions such as the Canadian Union of Public Employees (CUPE), which characterized the CIB as a "Bank of privatization" and a "Jackpot for corporations".

According to CUPE, the CIB's structure represents a betrayal of Prime Minister Justin Trudeau's campaign promises concerning infrastructure. Campaigning in 2015, Trudeau argued that the government could fund infrastructure projects by leveraging the public sector's low interest rates. Combined with his promise to run modest deficits, his rhetoric was distinctly anti-austerity. Some argue this was a bait-and-switch because the CIB is designed to promote public–private partnerships and asset recycling (the selling of existing public infrastructure to fund new projects). As such, Trudeau's "efforts to transfer public assets to private actors display a degree of finesse and deception far beyond the Conservative approach to infrastructure privatization."

After two years of operation, in 2019, the private sector was displeased by the Bank's slow pace of project approval. According to Conservative infrastructure critic Matt Jeneroux, the CIB "was supposed to be a new way to build infrastructure, but we're still faced with the same delays, and the issues of actually building infrastructure have gotten worse when we're tying up this much money in the bank."

Both the Conservative Party, led by Andrew Scheer, and the New Democratic Party (NDP), led by Jagmeet Singh, promised to wind down the CIB if they were elected to form government in the 2019 Canadian federal election. The Bloc Québécois also opposed the CIB on the grounds that any federal funds transferred to Quebec should have no strings attached. In the election, the Liberals retained government, albeit with minority status, downgraded from a previous majority government.

The opposition's displeasure with the bank continued through 2021. Conservative infrastructure critic and former leader Andrew Scheer called the CIB "a lemon of an institution" due to its failure to complete projects, while NDP infrastructure critic Taylor Bachrach criticized the bank's focus on attracting private institutional investments and argued for a return to the traditional public infrastructure funding model.

In February 2022, NDP MP Niki Ashton introduced a bill to rewrite the CIB's mandate to focus on projects that tackle the impacts of climate change, to fund publicly owned infrastructure instead of trying to involve private finance, and to invest more heavily in infrastructure in Indigenous and northern communities.

== Projects ==
Name	Partner	Location	Sector	Investment	Status
Réseau express métropolitain (REM)	Government of Quebec, CDPQ Infra	Montreal, Quebec	Public Transit	$1.28 billion (15-year senior secured loan)	Under construction
GO Expansion - On Corridor	Infrastructure Ontario and Metrolinx	Greater Toronto and Hamilton Area, Ontario	Public Transit	Up to $2 billion	Ongoing
Via Rail High Frequency Rail Project	Via Rail and Transport Canada	Ontario and Quebec	Public Transit	$55 million	Ongoing
Mapleton Water and Wastewater	Township of Mapleton	Mapleton, Ontario	Green Infrastructure	Up to $20 million	Cancelled
Lulu Island District Energy	City of Richmond, Lulu Island Energy Company	Richmond, British Columbia	Green Infrastructure		Memorandum of Understanding
Contrecoeur Port Terminal	Montreal Port Authority	Montreal, Quebec	Trade and Transportation	Up to $300 million	Ongoing
Taltson Hydroelectricity Expansion	Government of Northwest Territories	Northwest Territories	Green Infrastructure	Advisory Services	Ongoing
Pirate Harbour Wind Farm	Port Hawkesbury Paper	Point Tupper, Nova Scotia	Green Infrastructure		Memorandum of Understanding
Kivalliq Hydro-Fibre Link	Kivalliq Inuit Association, Sakku Investment Corporation, Anbaric Development Partners and Ontario Teachers' Pension Plan	Nunavut and Manitoba	Broadband Infrastructure		Memorandum of Understanding
Calgary-Banff Rail	Government of Alberta	Calgary International Airport to the Town of Banff, Alberta	Public Transit		Memorandum of Understanding
Alberta Irrigation	Government of Alberta	Southern Alberta	Trade and Transportation	$466 million	Ongoing
Oneida Energy Storage	Oneida Energy Storage LP	Southwestern Ontario	Clean power	$170 million	Memorandum of Understanding
New Westminster Rail Bridge	Public Services and Procurement Canada, Transport Canada and Housing, Infrastructure and Communities Canada	New Westminster, British Columbia	Trade and Transportation		Project Acceleration
Highway 697 Toll Bridge	Government of Alberta	Mackenzie County, Alberta	Trade and Transportation		Project Acceleration
Southern Manitoba Fibre	Valley Fiber Limited, DIF Capital Partners	Southern Manitoba	Broadband Infrastructure	$164 million	Ongoing
Lake Erie Connector	ITC Investment Holdings	Nanticoke, Ontario and Erie, Pennsylvania	Clean Power	$655 million	Ongoing
Montréal-Trudeau International Airport REM Station	Government of Canada, Government of Québec, Aéroports de Montréal	Greater Montreal Area, Québec	Public Transit	Up to $300 million	Ongoing
MD of Acadia and Special Areas Irrigation	Government of Alberta, Municipal District of Acadia No. 34, Special Areas Board	Southern Alberta	Trade and Transportation		Project Acceleration
Toronto Western Hospital Retrofit	VanCity Community Investment Bank, Noventa Energy Partners, Enbridge, Environment and Climate Change Canada, University Health Network (UHN)	Toronto, Ontario	Green Infrastructure	$19.3 million	Under Construction
Ontario Rural Broadband	Innovation, Science and Economic Development Canada (Universal Broadband Fund)	Ontario	Broadband	$1.3 billion	Final due diligence in progress

=== Cancelled waste and wastewater infrastructure project in Mapleton, Ontario ===
On July 15, 2019, the CIB made a $CDN20 million investment commitment in a water and wastewater project in the township of Mapleton, Ontario. The financing came in the form of a "standardized debt financing package" intended to "attract private capital expertise". Mapleton, with a rural population of 11,000, has been seeking a public-private partnership to "design, build, finance, operate and maintain" a proposed 20-year project to improve and expand" the township's publicly owned water and wastewater infrastructure".

The CIB said that the project is a potential pilot and model that could demonstrate to Canadian municipalities—including smaller communities—with water and wastewater challenges how the CIB can assist them in attracting private-sector capital for financing to improve publicly owned water and wastewater systems. While the water and wastewater systems will continue to be publicly owned, concerns have been raised by organizations, such as the Canadian Union of Public Employees (CUPE), that smaller communities may become locked into lengthy agreements with private financiers that result in higher user fees for water and wastewater services.

The proposal attracted international attention due to the project's unique financing model. However, in August 2020, after reviewing financial analyses of the main proposals, the township opted to cancel the project. A report showed that self-financing the project would be more advantageous for Mapleton than using the CIB's model.

== Acts ==
The CIB was established by the Canada Infrastructure Bank Act (CIB Act), an Act of Parliament on June 22, 2017.
