= Public–private partnership in Canada =

Alternative service delivery

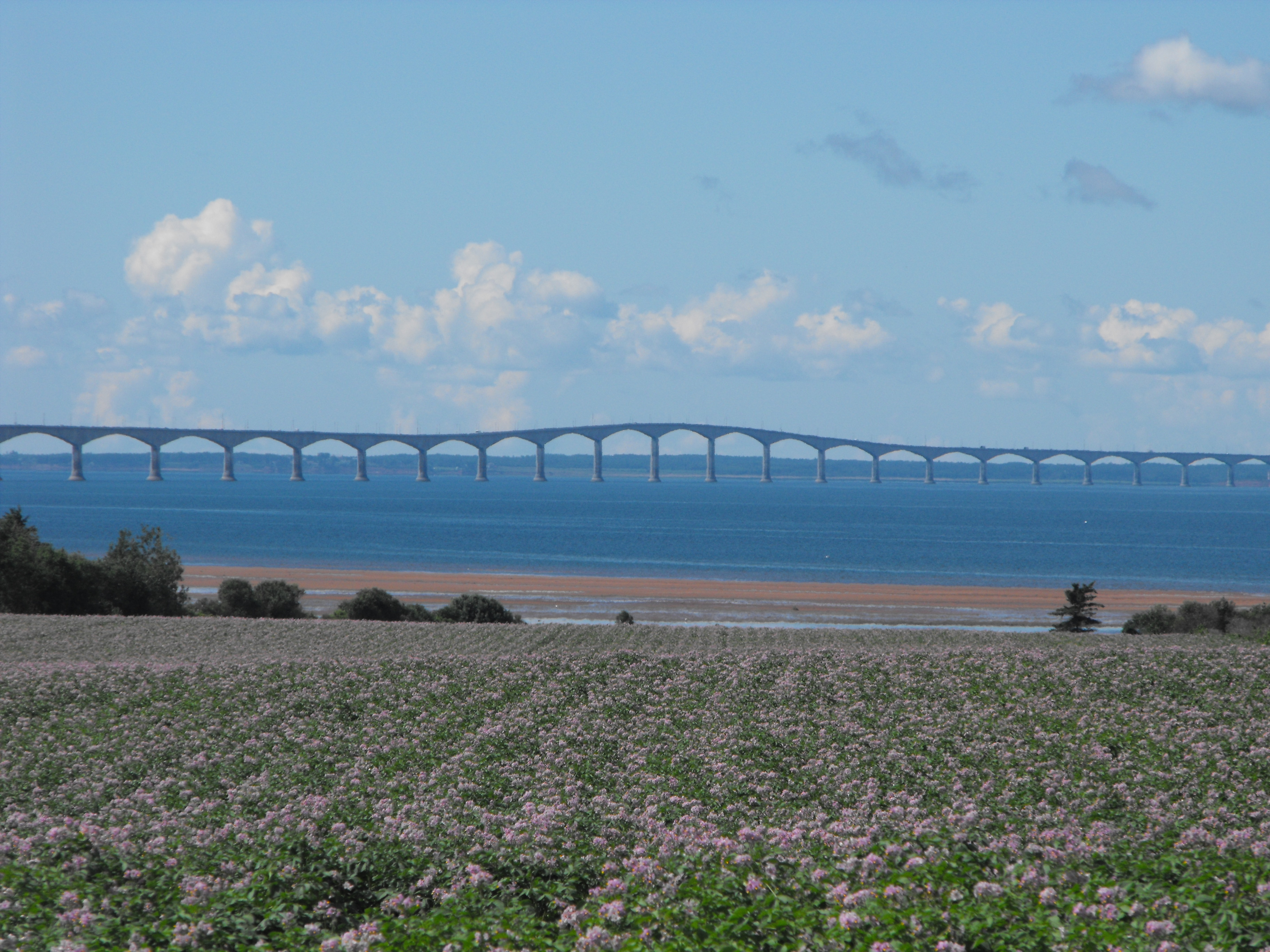
Confederation Bridge is an example of an infrastructure project financed through a P3 in Canada.

Public–private partnership (PPP or P3) in Canada is a form of alternative service delivery that involves a formal, collaborative arrangement between the public and private sectors, typically of a long-term nature. Public–private partnerships are commonly used for infrastructure projects related to healthcare, transportation, the environment, justice and correction, recreation and culture, and education.

The history of P3 projects in Canada can be divided into two waves: 1990–2000 and 2000–present. Over 220 P3 projects have been undertaken in Canada. The earliest and most commonly known examples of P3 projects are Highway 407 in Ontario, the Royal Ottawa Hospital, and the Confederation Bridge linking New Brunswick and Prince Edward Island.

The original rationale for P3s was to provide cities with top-quality infrastructure without creating more direct public-sector debt; they allowed governments to make off-balance-sheet investments in infrastructure. Advocates argue that P3s make use of the expertise and innovation of the private sector and the incentive of capital market to enhance public projects. They argue that P3s provide better value for money than traditional procurement methods because they transfer a project's risk from the public to the private sector. Indeed, under P3s, financial responsibility for a project can either be shared or transferred to the private sector. PPP Canada was a Crown corporation with the duty of contracting out several services to the private sector, as well as providing funding at both the federal and provincial levels.

P3s in Canada have received notable criticism from scholars, stakeholders, and the media. Complaints revolved around the issues of accountability, higher costs, loss of democratic control over public services, and the user fee rates of some projects. Discrepancies between steering and rowing, level of public interest, labour relations, autonomy and accountability, and savings and performance are often topics of P3 debates. Some critics question how the conflicting values and operations of the public and private sectors affect the ability to achieve desired goals efficiently. A common area of debate concerns how the goal of economic gain in private-sector values interacts with the public-sector value of public good. There is evidence both in favour of and against P3s.

== Definition ==
There is no consensus about how to define a PPP. The term can cover hundreds of different types of long-term contracts with a wide range of risk allocations, funding arrangements, and transparency requirements.

The Canadian Council for Public-Private Partnerships, a longstanding promoter of P3s in Canada, defines a P3 as "a cooperative venture between the public and private sectors, built on the expertise of each partner, that best meets clearly defined public needs through the appropriate allocation of resources, risks, and rewards".

According to Simon Fraser University professor Aidan R. Vining, "a P3 typically involves a private entity financing, constructing, or managing a project in return for a promised stream of payments directly from government or indirectly from users over the projected life of the project or some other specified period of time". York University scholar Daniel Cohn defines P3s as "instruments for meeting the obligations of the state that are transformed so as to involve private property ownership as a key element in the operation of that instrument."

The Ontario Hospital Association describes P3s as "a relationship structured between a government entity and a private entity whereby the private entity assumes a defined level of responsibility for the provision and/or operation of a facility or service which has previously been the sole responsibility of government".

=== Privatization? ===
There is a debate on whether P3s constitute privatization or not. Some argue that P3s are not privatization because the government retains ownership of the asset and remains responsible for public service delivery. Others argue that P3s exist on a continuum of privatization, P3s being a more limited form of privatization than the outright sale of public assets, but more extensive than simply contracting out government services.

Supporters of P3s, such as former finance minister Jim Flaherty, generally take the position that P3s do not constitute privatization. Meanwhile, P3 opponents argue that they are a form of privatization. The Canadian Union of Public Employees, a major institutional opponent of P3s, describes them as "privatization by stealth".

== History ==
Since the 1990s, over 220 P3 projects have been initiated in Canada. The provinces that started and have most used P3s are Ontario, British Columbia, Alberta, and Quebec.

=== First wave ===
P3 projects in Canada can be categorized into two waves or phases. The first wave of P3s in Canada were initiated and launched between the 1990s and early 2000s. Notable projects from this time include Highway 407 in the Greater Toronto Area, Yonge–Dundas Square (now Sankofa Square) in downtown Toronto, the Royal Ottawa Hospital in Ontario, the Brampton Civic Hospital in Ontario, and the Confederation Bridge linking Prince Edward Island and New Brunswick. The development of a number of schools in Nova Scotia and New Brunswick also followed a P3 BOOT model. Near the end of the first wave, many new P3 projects included water treatment plants and municipal sports complexes.

The outcomes of the first wave of P3s failed to meet the public's expectations, and the projects were scrutinized by scholars, stakeholders, the media, and auditors. Criticisms revolved around topics such as complex concessions, lack of transparency and accountability, and the high private cost of capital.

=== Second wave ===
The second wave of P3s has occurred between early 2000s and the present. The heavy scrutiny of the first wave of P3s led to a greater emphasis on meeting expectations and making P3s more politically acceptable to stakeholder groups (especially the public). The main argument used in the second phase to promote P3s in Canada is that they provide better value for money than traditional government procurement.

In 2002, British Columbia created the Capital Asset Management policy, a framework that was adopted by other provincial governments across the country. Under the framework, the government must always consider using P3s for infrastructure projects costing above a given threshold. The policy also states that special P3 agencies should be created to advocate for and deliver P3 projects in Canada. The provincial governments lead the P3 initiative in the second wave, using the model for projects such as healthcare facilities, justice facilities, roads, and bridges.

In 2009, Stephen Harper initiated the federal government's commitment to P3 infrastructure by creating a Crown corporation, PPP Canada Inc. PPP Canada aimed to invest in public infrastructure though P3s to contribute to long-term economic benefits and maximize value to appeal to public interest. The corporation also had a P3 Canada fund, under which provinces, territories, and municipalities could apply for funding from the federal government. Since its creation, P3 projects have been more commonly used for infrastructure such as local roads, public transit, and wastewater systems. P3s have also been used in projects such as brownfield redevelopment, national highways, green energy, regional and local airports, water systems, and solid waste management systems.

In 2014, the Government of Alberta cancelled plans to construct 19 P3 schools after discovering that they would cost $14 million more than regular schools.

=== Trudeau era ===
Justin Trudeau is in favor of public-private partnerships. However, during his premiership, the federal government removed the P3 screen as a condition for federal funding for infrastructure projects in order speed up funding approvals for "strategic and trade-enabling" projects. This does not mean that infrastructure projects cannot be funded by P3s, simply that they do not have to consider the P3 model.

In 2017, the Government of Canada created the Canada Infrastructure Bank, a federal Crown Corporation tasked with financially supporting revenue-generating infrastructure projects that are in the public interest through public-private partnerships.

In 2018, the Government of Canada dissolved PPP Canada. The minister of Infrastructure and Communities, Amarjeet Sohi, justified the decision by claiming that PPP Canada had achieved its mandate of making P3s common practice across Canada and was no longer needed.

== Types ==
There are several subcategories of P3s. The forms of P3s in Canada include build–operate–transfer (BOOT), company-owned-government-operated (COGO), and government-owned-company-operated (GOCO).

=== Common public-private partnership models ===
While there are many types or models of PPPs, the following are some of the most common designs in Canada:

- Operation and maintenance contract (O&M): A private economic agent, under a government contract, operates a publicly owned asset for a specified period of time. Formal ownership of the asset remains with the public entity. In terms of private-sector risk and involvement, this model is on the lower end of the spectrum.
- Build-finance (BF) model: The private actor builds the asset and finances the cost during the construction period, then responsibility is handed over to the public entity. In terms of private-sector risk and involvement, this model is again on the lower end of the spectrum.
- Design-build-finance-maintain (DBFM) model: "The private sector designs, builds and finances an asset and provides hard facility management (hard FM) or maintenance services under a long-term agreement." This model lies in the middle of the spectrum for private-sector risk and involvement.
- Design-build-finance-maintain-operate (DBFMO) model: In this model, the private partner is responsible for the entire project ranging from design to construction, operation and maintenance of the infrastructure, including fundraising. This model lies on the higher end for private-sector risk and involvement.
- Concession: "A private sector concessionaire undertakes investments and operates the facility for a fixed period of time after which the ownership reverts to the public sector." In terms of private-sector risk and involvement, this model is very high.

== Sectors ==
=== Transportation ===
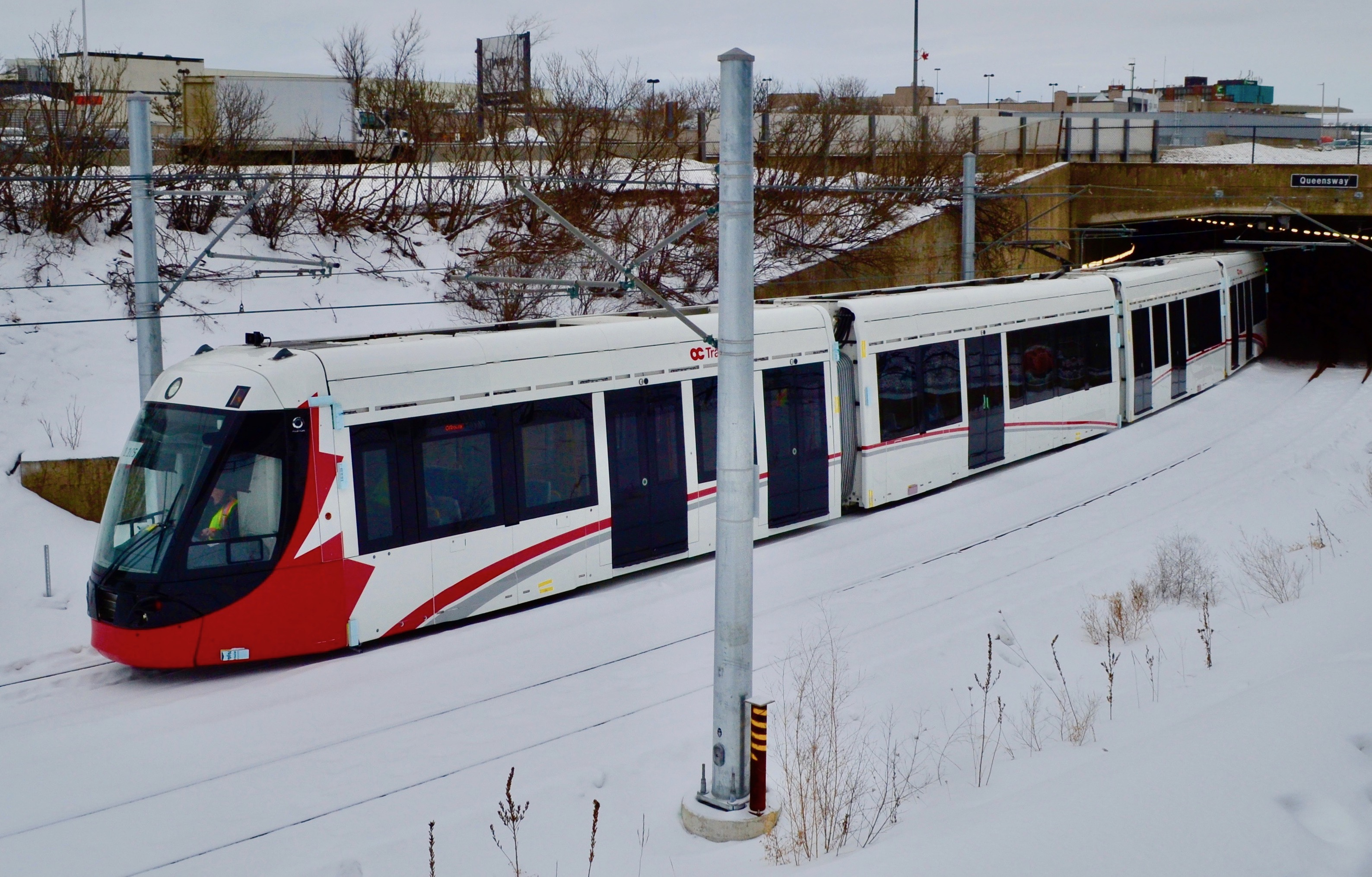
The Confederation Line train testing outside the St-Laurent station. The Ottawa light rail train is prone to [power] failures during "wet or inclement weather", as well as in heavy snow.

P3s have increasingly been used to build roads, bridges, and public transit infrastructure. The Confederation Bridge connecting Prince Edward Island to New Brunswick was one of the first PPPs in Canada. Notable P3 public transit projects include the Confederation Line in Ottawa, the Viva Rapid Transit in Ontario's York region, and the Canada Line rapid transit service in Metro Vancouver. Toll highways created through a P3 include the Sea-to-Sky Highway in British Columbia, the western extension of Autoroute 30 in Quebec, and Ontario Highway 407 near Toronto, discussed below.

==== Ontario Highway 407 ====
Ontario Highway 407 is a tolled 400-series highway that spans the Greater Toronto Area (GTA) in Ontario. When the Ontario government started planning the project, its normal process for highway construction was not possible given the financial constraints of the recession of the early 1990s. The Peterson government sought out public-private partnerships. Two firms bid on the project, with Canadian Highways International Corporation being selected as the operator of the highway. The highway was to be financed through user tolls for 35 years, after which it would return to the provincial system as a toll-free 400-series highway.

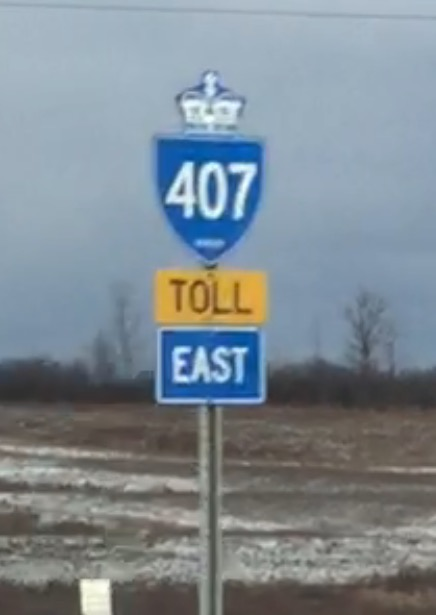
Highway 407 shield in Oshawa

The highway was then privatized by Premier Mike Harris in the year leading up to the 1999 provincial election. It was leased to a conglomerate of private companies called 407 International Inc., initially owned by the Spanish multinational Cintra Infrastructure (43.23%) and various subsidiaries of the Canada Pension Plan Investment Board (40%) and the Montreal-based engineering firm SNC-Lavalin (16.77%). The deal included a 99-year lease agreement with unlimited control over the highway and its tolls, dependent on traffic volume; however, the government maintains the right to build a transport system within the highway right-of-way. The highway is today described as a "value generating monster" and "cash cow" for SNC-Lavalin and one of the "worst financial missteps" from any government in Ontario's history.

Although the original plan was for the tolls to end after the construction cost was paid off, after about 35 years, there is no indication that the private owners will eliminate the tolls. Although Harris promised that tolls would not rise by more than 30%, as of 2015 they had risen by over 200%, from about 10 cents to over 30 cents per kilometre. Another criticism is that, a part of the contractual agreement with the government, the Ministry of Transportation is required to deny licence plate validation stickers to drivers who have an outstanding 407 ETR bill over 125 days past due.

In 2002, just three years after the highway's sale for C$3.1 billion, Macquarie Infrastructure Group, an Australian investment firm, estimated that it was worth four times that price. By 2019, the estimated value had risen to C$30 billion. Both the length of the lease and the fact that the road is controlled by private corporations mean that decisions about the road and the tolls are less accountable to the public. The Harris government failed to put any restrictions on toll increases (as long as the road attracted a certain volume of cars). As a result, commuters will have no protection against rising tolls on the highway during the 99-year lease term. The public has accused the 407 ETR of predatory billing practices, including false billing and continued plate denial after bankruptcy. In 2016, after a four-year legal battle, consumers won an $8 million class action lawsuit.

=== Schools ===
In the 1990s, the cash-strapped governments of Nova Scotia and New Brunswick decided to use P3s to finance the construction of much-needed schools, including 39 in Nova Scotia. The governments were ideologically inclined to support expanding the private sector. P3s allowed them to pay for the schools "off-balance-sheet, as the private sector would initially finance the projects while the public sector would pay for them every year through the operation phase. This allowed the governments to avoid counting these projects in their public debts and made them look more fiscally responsible. However, auditor general's reports from the end of the decade revealed that these funding arrangements made the projects more expensive overall, and barred future governments from using such accounting fallacies to fund infrastructure projects.

On top of being more expensive for taxpayers, the P3 school projects had significant negative consequences. Contractors cutting corners led to leaky roofs and unusable sports fields. Community needs were not incorporated into school designs, and community groups were charged exorbitant fees to rent the facilities after hours. In Halifax, rental rates at P3 school facilities were 10 times the rate of public school facilities. School grass and walls were designated as private assets, and artwork could not be hung on school walls without the owners' approval. The owners also demanded a share of proceeds from fundraising events on school property.

Similar issues emerged in Alberta P3 schools build in the 2000s, leading the government to cancel the development of an additional 19 P3 schools in 2014.

=== Healthcare ===
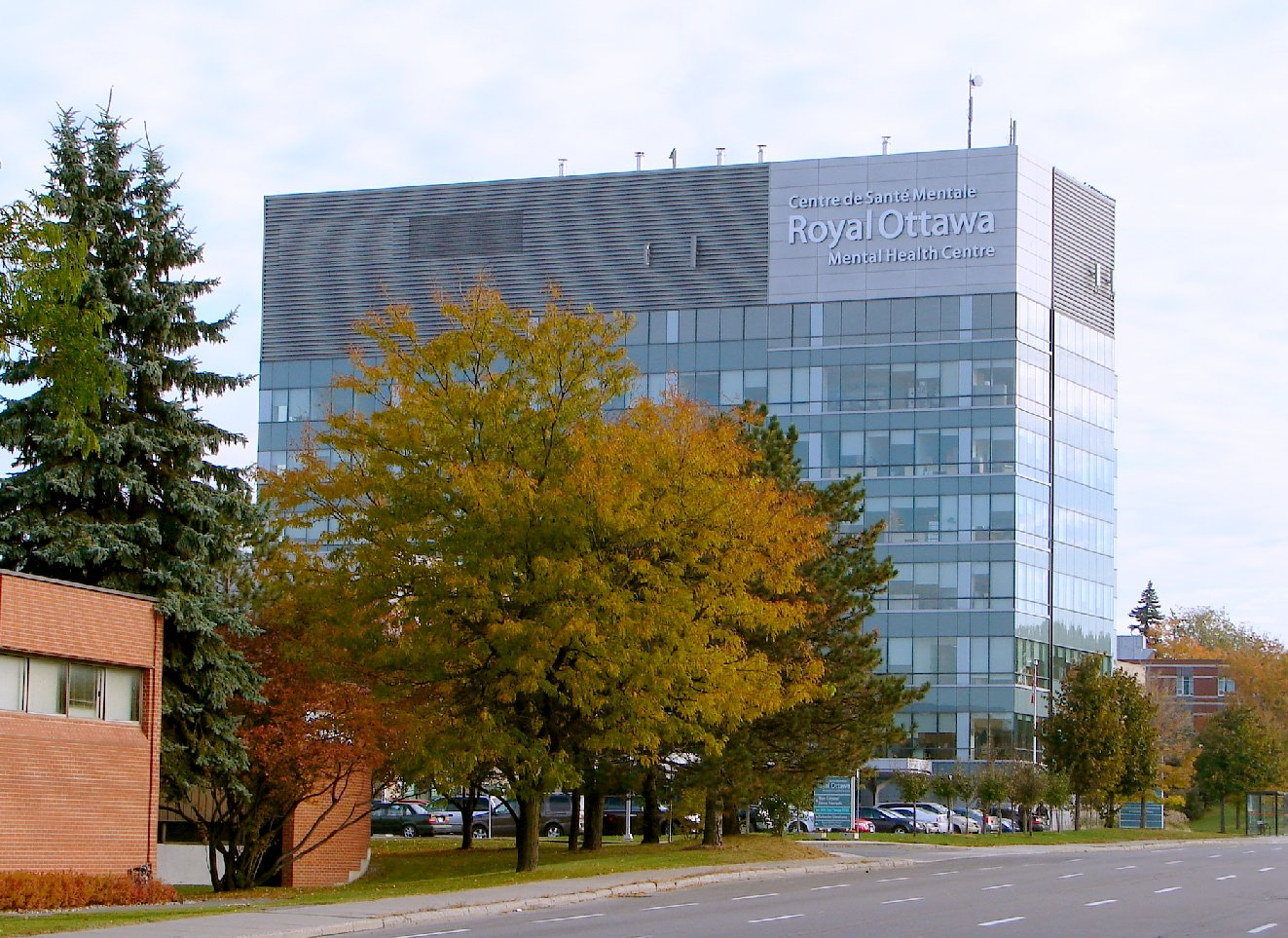
Royal Ottawa Hospital

The Royal Ottawa Hospital (reopened in 2006) and the Brampton Civic Hospital (opened in 2007) are some of Canada's first public hospitals to be designed, built, financed, and maintained as private-public partnerships. They were built by a joint venture of Carillion and EllisDon. The Brampton Civic Hospital is one of Canada's first public hospitals to be designed, built, financed, and maintained under a private-public partnership. The Government of Ontario decided to build them as P3s in November 2001. The projects were "highly politicized, offered poor value for money, and came in much later and at a higher price than originally promised".

Public service unions and public healthcare advocates contested the projects from the start, their fight culminating in a 2003 judgement that saw the courts decide to uphold the government's decision to procure the projects as P3s. This was followed by another four-year legal battle to force the government to publish financial details of these P3 projects. The Supreme Court ordered their release, but the reports came out heavily redacted.

Nevertheless, healthcare PPPs spread to other Canadian provinces in the following years. Some examples include the Abbotsford Hospital and Cancer Centre and the Université de Montréal's Hospital Research Center.

== Debates over P3s ==
P3s have been highly controversial as funding tools, largely over concerns that public return on investment is lower than returns for the private funder. The lack of a shared understanding of what a P3 is and the secrecy surrounding their financial details makes it complex to evaluate whether P3s have been successful. The rationales used to promote P3s have changed over the years, leading some to ask if P3s are “A policy in search of a rationale”. P3 advocates hold that private-sector firms working under market conditions are more efficient, more innovative, and better at allocating resources than government. Under this paradigm, P3s are a way to reduce the role of the state in infrastructure projects.

The first wave of P3s in Canada was implemented in multiple sectors across different provinces with little federal coordination. The rationales used for each project, sectors, and regions varies, but four main arguments have been used to promote them.

=== Finding funds ===
The first argument is that P3s attract new money for infrastructure. By granting a concession to a private investor in an infrastructure project, a P3 brings the funding required to complete the project and generate a return on investment when the structure is operational. These returns can come from either user fees or government payments. Toll roads and bridges were uncommon in Canada until the advent of P3s. Critics of P3s have also pointed out that, for projects where user fees cannot be charged, P3s do not alleviate financial pressures on governments.

=== Off-balance-sheet accounting ===
A second rationale is that P3s enable off-balance-sheet accounting of infrastructure. They allow governments to continue investing in infrastructure without adding to the public debt. This practice has been criticized by auditors general as an accounting fallacy, as the costs of the projects must still be paid in full by the government through deferred payments. Such schemes can misallocate the risk between partners or increase project costs for governments in the long run. In the second wave, P3s were all crafted on balance sheet.

=== Decentralization ===
A third argument is that P3s restructure the provision of public service. They decentralize infrastructure planning away from elected officials and toward independent agencies and consultants. This has been touted as a negative by critics, who point out that overreliance on consultants leads to a privatization of public policy development. P3 advocates, however, see the introduction of market forces into infrastructure planning positively, arguing that it brings about more innovation and better risk management. Critics disagree that these goals are achieved, as there is little competition in the P3 marketplace.

=== Value for money ===
The final and today most common rationale for P3s is that they provide better value for money than traditional public delivery methods. "Value for money" does not mean that the project is of better quality or lower costs. According to its advocates, drivers of value for money in P3s include "stimulating innovation during the project planning process, encouraging lifecycle asset management, and transferring construction and operations risk to the private sector".

Of these, the transfer of risk is the most important driver of value for money in P3s. However, not all of the project risk is transferred to the private sector; only those risks that the private sector can bear, as outlined in the contract. Auditors general of Quebec, Ontario, and New Brunswick have questioned P3 rationales based on a transfer of risk, the latter stating he was "unable to develop any substantive evidence supporting risk transfer decisions". Furthermore, many P3 concessions proved to be unstable and required to be renegotiated in ways that favoured the contractor.

== Criticism ==
The main criticisms of P3s relate to the associated costs of P3s. There are systemic factors that increase the cost of P3s as opposed to a public option. These are the private sector's higher cost of capital, higher transactions fees associated with longer and more complex contract negotiations, and the private sector's required return on investment, usually paid by the government. Researchers at the University of Toronto studied 28 P3 projects developed in Ontario from 2002 to 2012 and found that "the base cost of delivering each project is invariably lower (on average 16% less) when delivered through a traditional procurement rather than a PPP".

Another prominent criticism is the loss of accountability and transparency associated with P3s. P3s in Canada offer service delivery at an "arm's length" from the government for greater flexibility in various aspects of service delivery. The public sector has mechanisms to keep governmental actors accountable, but if something were to go wrong in a P3 project, accountability is blurred between private and public entities. Most financial details of P3 projects are confidential and thus unavailable to the public.

Some argue that the public interest can be hindered when the private sector is involved because of its profit-driven approach. If the profit motive is not balanced with the public interest, too much emphasis is put on user responsiveness, and efforts are targeting the bottom line. Although these goals can benefit society, the government's effort to further the public interest may not be achieved efficiently.

There are also potential labour issues with P3s. Using the P3 model usually replaces long-term workers with contract workers. Using a temporary workforce can result in very little loyalty to the employer and reduce the number of public-sector workers needed.

Public-sector unions such as the Canadian Union of Public Employees and some centre-left political parties such as the NDP argue that P3s negatively affect wages and working conditions for public servants. They also claim that P3s usually involves the participation of multinational corporations, which can take business away from local contractors.

== P3 units ==
To respond to critics of the over political and lack of expertise in negation of the public sector between P3 agreements, six provinces have created P3 units: government agencies or Crown corporations responsible for promoting and facilitating P3s in their jurisdictions. These agencies are staffed with professionals specialized in areas such as law, consultancy, business management, accountancy, and finance. The creation of PPP Canada, the federal government's P3 unit, furthers this rationale. PPP Canada explicitly outlines when P3s are the "right alternative" for certain projects. This crown corporation's arguments for recommending P3s were that its benefits are greater than its costs through calculations of risk, expectation, and value for money analysis.

PPP units in Canada have been criticized for having a structural bias in favor of public-private partnerships, especially if promoting PPPs as part of their mandate. As such, some of them have developed project assessment methodologies that were skewed in favor of P3s over a public delivery model. Quebec's PPP unit was dissolved in 2009 following an auditor general's report detailing how its assessment methodology was biased toward P3s. Partnerships BC operates more like a business than a government agency. As per example, they refer to other government agencies and ministries as its clients despite being a crown corporation and under the responsibility of the Ministry of Finance.

Canada's P3 units are:

- Partnerships BC (Province of British Columbia) (2002–present)
- Agence des partenariats public-privé du Québec (Province of Quebec) (2004–2009)
- Infrastructure Ontario (Province of Ontario) (2005–Present)
- PPP Canada (Federal) (2009–2018)
- Saskbuilds (Province of Saskatchewan) (2012–Present)

A few other provinces have teams within their ministry responsible for public infrastructure dedicated to a similar role as these P3 units. PPP Canada's mandate was essentially transferred to the Canada Infrastructure Bank when it was created in 2017.

== Private partners ==
There are three kinds of public sector partners in Canadian P3s, building and engineering firms, maintenance service firms, and financiers. For the majority of P3 projects, EllisDon and/or SNC-Lavalin represent the building and engineering private partner firms. Operation and maintenance partners for P3 hospitals were most often the multinational corporations of Sodexo and Carillion. Local companies are rarely involved as partners in P3 projects.

Financier Partners secure funding for P3s by offering loans to construction companies; they are creditors to the project. Financiers can include wealthy individuals interested in infrasture, but they are most often institutional investors like pension funds, life insurance companies, sovereign wealth and superannuation funds, and banks. Public infrastructure is a relatively low-risk, high-reward investment, and as such P3 financing attract a lot of pensions funds, such as the Ontario Municipal Employees Retirement System (OMERS) and the Ontario Teachers' Pension Plan. OMERS came to own 65% stake in the Private partner responsible for Confederation Bridge. Wall Street firms and Banks around the world are investing in P3 projects in Canada, with Wall street being more interested in P3s since the 2008 financial crisis. The Dutch state-owned banked ABN Amro has financed many P3 projects in Canada.

== Canadian Council for Public-Private Partnerships ==
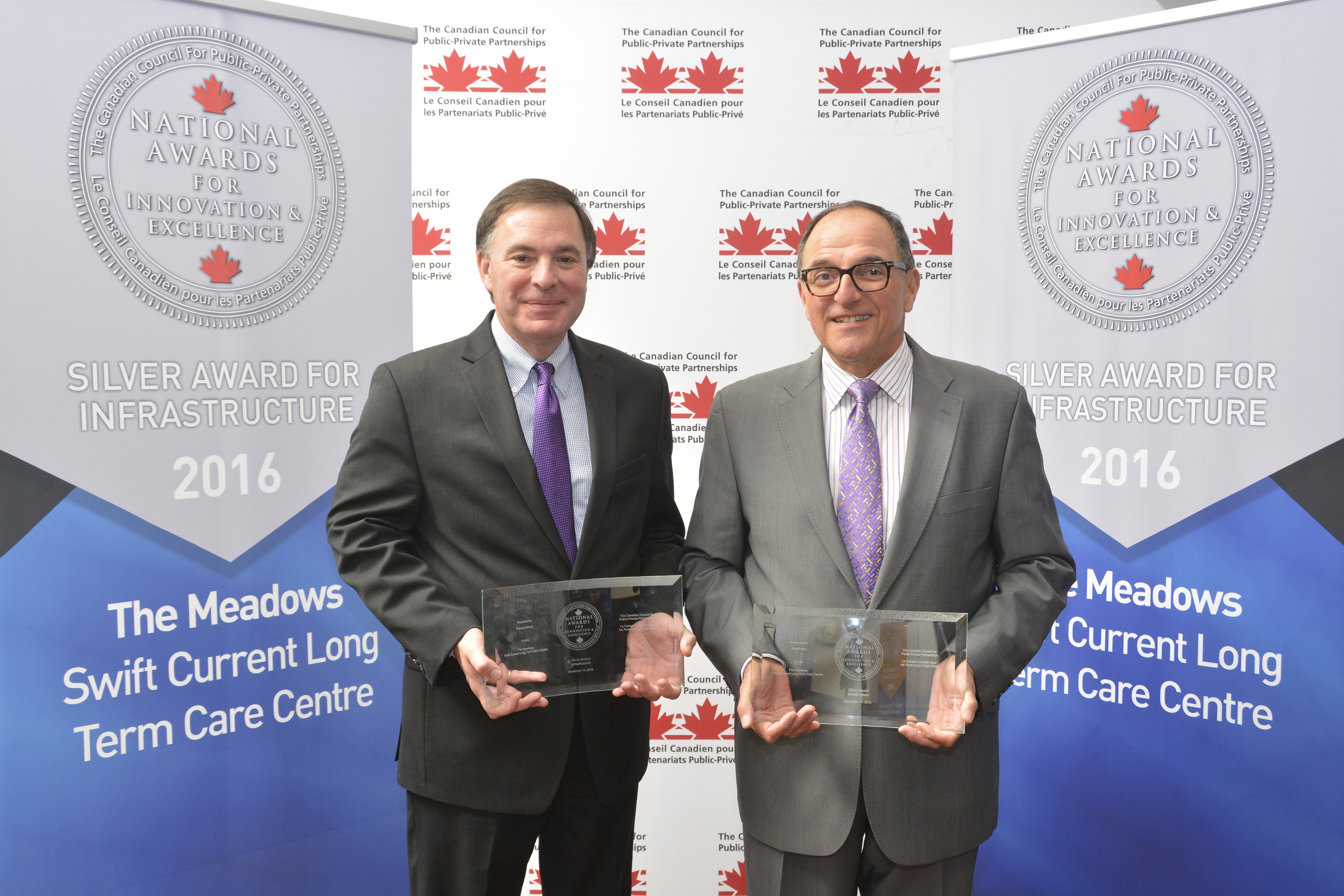
Saskatchewan minister of Saskbuilds Gordon Wyant accepting the CCPPP Award for a long-term care facility in Swift Current, Saskatchewan

The Canadian Council for Public-Private Partnerships (CCPPP) is a pan-Canadian organization founded in 1993 to promote public-private partnerships. The organization self-describes as a "member-driven organization". However, its board of directors contains representation from companies who directly benefit from the implementation of P3s, such as PricewaterhouseCoopers, Macquarie Group, Fengate, OMERS and EllisDon.

== Political, economic, and societal influence ==
Usually Canadian political parties that support neoliberalism favor P3 initiatives. Political ideology is one of the main reasons P3s were created. Some research has been done on how the increase use of P3s in Canada effects public policy. A common public policy concern is environmental legislation. There is research supporting that traditionally the private sector has always put profit over environmental factors, so the introduction of P3s may lead to less concern for environmentally friendly projects. Environmental initiative projects are sometimes not as profitable. There is also supporting evidence that shows climate action plans are not constrained by P3 initiatives because of the capacity of public sector leadership to engage in contractual agreements outlining environmental policy priorities.

Despite the 2008 financial crisis, which resulted in a decline of P3s worldwide, P3s have continued to be promoted and expanded in Canada, making it an exception. Other policies relating to the political economy restrict some of the freedom that may be necessary to improve on the social benefits of the P3 model. Consumers are paying for these projects either through taxes or through user fees.

P3s continue to be a subject of controversy and debate in Canadian politics. There has been pressure in the past put on governments by users to “buy out” the P3 operators, while at the same time, non-user taxpayers have paid no attention to P3 predicaments. The P3 model is intertwined with issues surrounding politics, privatization, financial, and social welfare issues.

== 2013 Regina Referendum on Wastewater Plant Funding ==
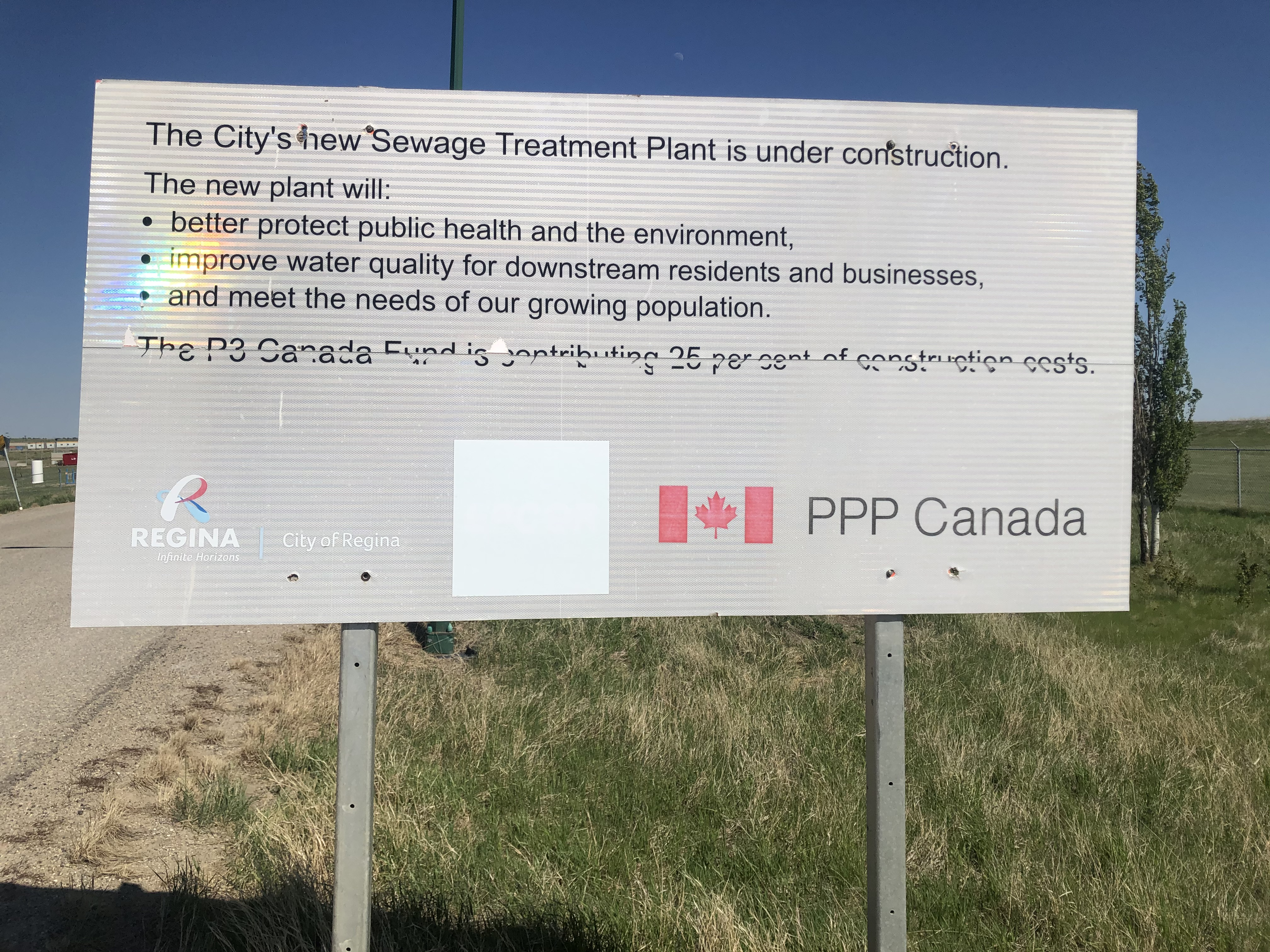
Sign at the entrance of the Regina Wastewater Treatment Plant

A city-wide referendum on a new waste water treatment facility was held in Regina, Saskatchewan on September 25, 2013. The issue of the referendum was whether the facility would be financed through a design-bid-build (DBB) approach or through a public-private partnership (P3).

The "Yes" side was directed by the citizens' group Regina Water Watch, while the "No" campaign was run by the City of Regina and was led by Regina Mayor Michael Fougere. The "Yes" campaign received assistance from the Canadian Union of Public Employees. They published the report "Flushing money away: Why the Privatization of Wastewater Treatment Plant is a bad idea", which estimates that a P3 funding scheme would cost the city $61 million more than a DBB. The "No" side received assistance from the Regina Chamber of Commerce and federal finance minister Jim Flaherty, who expressed support for the goal of the campaign in an op-ed entitled "Why I'm giving Regina $58.5 million", in reference to his government's promise of funding part of the costs of the plant if the P3 option was selected.

The result was 57% against the DBB approach, and the treatment plant ended up being financed by a P3.
