= Ariake-Yue Station =

Railway station in Shimabara, Nagasaki Prefecture, Japan

Ariake-Yue Station 有明湯江駅
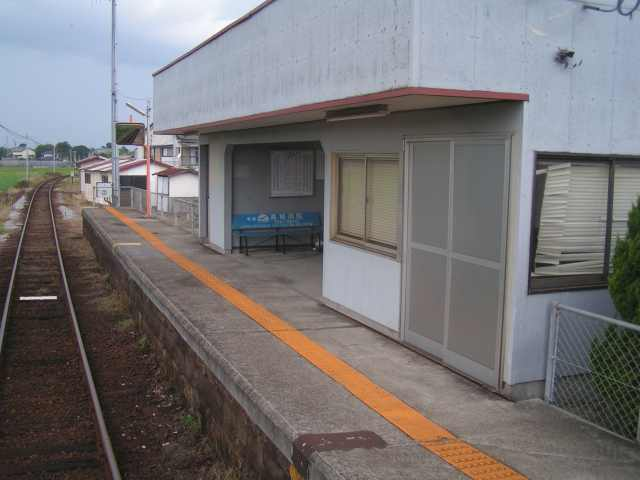
- Ariake-Yue Station

General information
- Location: Ariake-chō, Shimabara-shi, Nagasaki-ken 859-1401; Japan
- Coordinates: 32°51′29.68″N 130°19′41.66″E
- Operator: Shimabara Railway
- Line: ■ Shimabara Railway Line
- Distance: 31.8 km from Isahaya
- Platforms: 1 side platform

Other information
- Status: Unstaffed
- Website: Official website

History
- Opened: 6 May 1919
- Former names: Yue (to 1936); Shimatetsu-Yue (to 2019)

Passengers
- FY2018: 49 daily

Services
Preceding station	Shimabara Railway	Following station
Taira towards Isahaya	Shimabara Railway Line	Ōmisaki towards Shimabarakō
Location
- Location within Nagasaki Prefecture Location within Japan

Ariake-Yue Station (有明湯江駅, Ariake-Yue-eki) is a passenger railway station located in the Ariake neighborhood of Shimabara Nagasaki. It is operated by third-sector railway company Shimabara Railway.

== Lines ==
The station is served by the Shimabara Railway Line and is located 31.8 km from the starting point of the line at Isahaya.

== Station layout ==
The station is on the ground level with one side platform and one track. The track runs from northwest to southeast, and the platform is on the northeast side of the track. The one-story station building is located towards the center of the platform, adjacent to the north side. Inside the station there are toilets, a waiting room, and a station office. It is an unattended station.

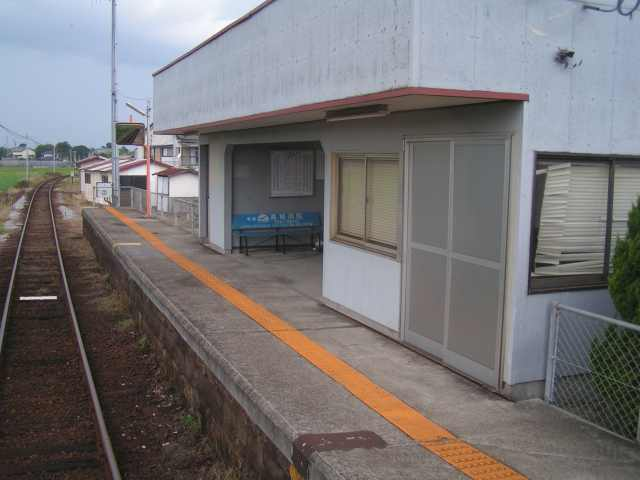
Platforms

== History ==
Ariake-Yue Station was opened on 6 May 1919 as Yue Station (湯江駅, Yue-eki). It was renamed Shimatetsu-Yue Station (島鉄湯江駅, Shimatetsu-Yue-eki) in 1934. The station was renamed to its present name on 1 October 2019.

== Passenger statistics ==
In fiscal 2018, there were a total of 17,778 boarding passengers, given a daily average of 49 passengers.

== Surrounding area ==
- National Route 251
- Shimabara City Yue Elementary School

== See also ==
- List of railway stations in Japan
