= Fatima Yasmin =

Bangladeshi bureaucrat and vice-president of the Asian Development Bank

Fatima Yasmin is a Bangladeshi bureaucrat and vice-president of the Asian Development Bank (ADB). She served as senior secretary of the Finance Division. She is the first female Secretary of finance division in the history of Bangladesh. Before promoted to senior secretary to the Finance division, she has served as secretary at Economic Relations Division since Feb. 23, 2020. Prior to this position, she was Vice-Chairman, Export Promotion Bureau (EPB), Ministry of Commerce and Director General, Institute of Public Finance (IPF), Ministry of Finance.

== Early life and education ==
Yasmin joined Bangladesh civil service as a 9th batch officer of the administration cadre at 1991. She completed her MBA from Institute of Business Administration, University of Dhaka in 1991 and a master’s in development economics from Australian National University, Canberra in 1995.

== Career ==
Yasmin worked in different capacities for agriculture, women and children affairs and defence ministry in her job life. She is experienced to work for Asian Development Bank, European Union, and the UN’s International Jute Organization. On 16 June 2022 she has been promoted to the rank of Senior Secretary. She is the Chairperson of Infrastructure Investment Facilitation Company. She has been appointed the first Bangladeshi vice-president of the Asian Development Bank (ADB) in June, 2023. She is serving as Vice-President for sectors, themes at ADB since August, 2023.
