= CityStudio Vancouver =

- Company type: Public
- Founded: 2010
- Founder: Duane Elverum; Dr. Janet Moore
- Headquarters: Vancouver, British Columbia, Canada
- Number of employees: 9
- Website: citystudiovancouver.com

CityStudio Vancouver is an innovation hub where university students, citizens, and City of Vancouver staff collaborate on Vancouver related projects. CityStudio operates a full-time studio course and coordinates a network of campus courses at Vancouver universities and colleges.

== History ==
In 2010, the City of Vancouver set the goal of becoming the greenest city in the world by the end of the decade (2020). In July 2010, the City of Vancouver launched the "Talk Green To Us" initiative, where citizens suggested ideas and voted on them. In October 2010, the city held the Greenest City Idea Slam, where the top four voted ideas were presented to the Mayor and a panel including Councillor Andrea Reimer, Deputy City Manager Sadhu Johnston, Arran Stephens, President of Nature's Path Foods; Tamara Vrooman, chief executive officer of Vancity; Janet Austin, chief executive officer of YWCA Vancouver; Matt O'Grady, Editor of BC Business Magazine; Greenest City Action Team member Cheeying Ho, executive director of the Whistler Centre for Sustainability; Paula V. Murillo of Latincouver; and Emily Jubenvill of the Vancouver Public Space Network.

CityStudio Vancouver was selected by the Mayor to move forward as a pilot program. Four months later, the Presidents and Vice Presidents involved in the Campus-City Collaboration (C3 - BCIT, ECUAD, Langara, SFU, UBC, VCC) met with the Mayor and approved CityStudio as a project of the City of Vancouver to engage staff, community members and students in collaborative city building.

Since 2011, CityStudio has engaged 75 city staff and 3500 students from 6 universities, contributing 195 projects on the ground, 96,000 hours of training, research, and action for collaborative city building supporting the Greenest City Action Plan, and the Healthy City and Engaged City Strategies.
