= Janice Fukakusa =

Canadian businesswomen and executive

Janice Fukakusa CM
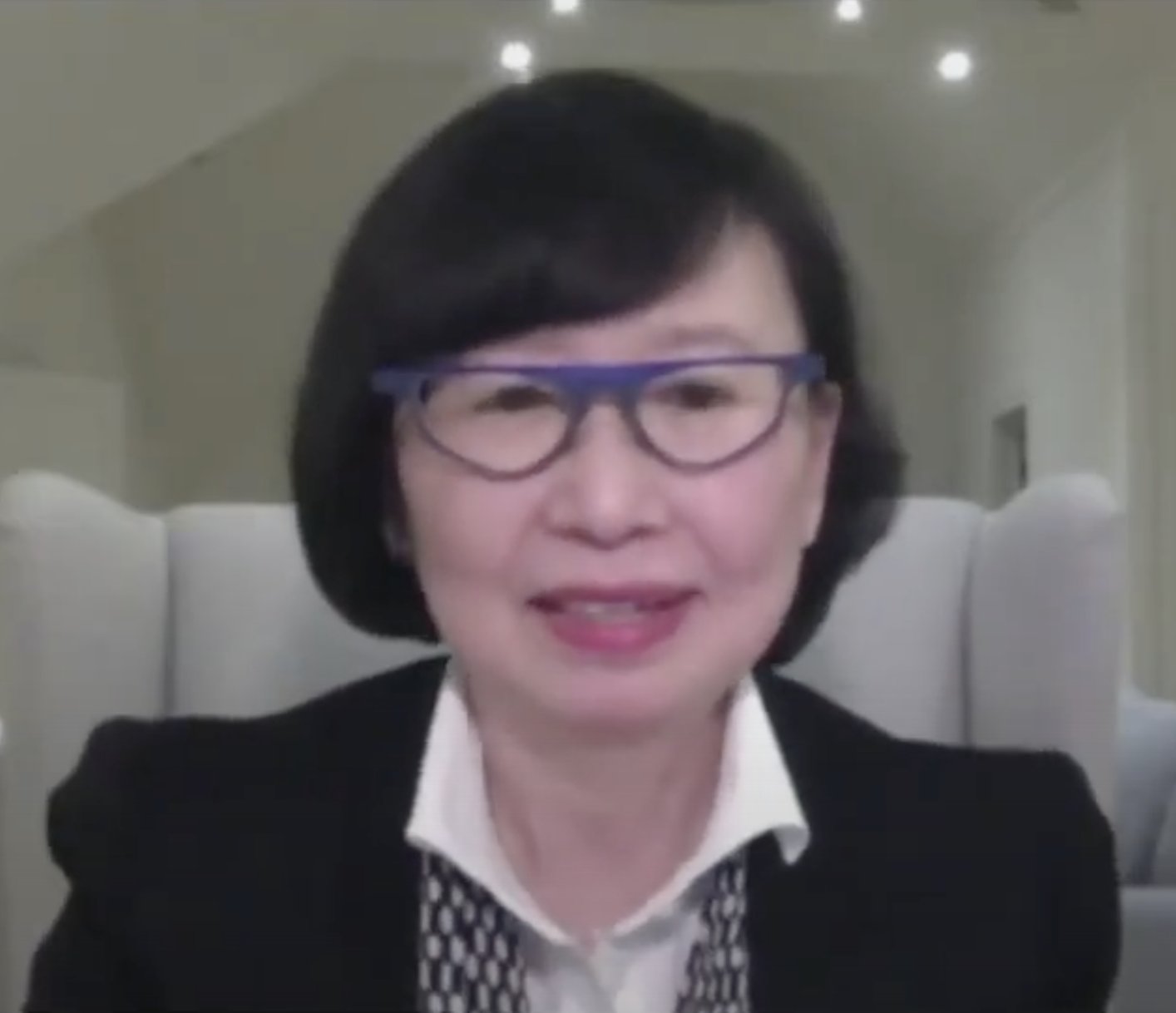
- Janice Fukakusa in March 2021

5th Chancellor of Toronto Metropolitan University
- In office October 10, 2018 (Note: Prior to 2022, Fukakusa was the Chancellor of Ryerson University) – October 10, 2024
- President: Mohamed Lachemi
- Preceded by: Lawrence Bloomberg
- Succeeded by: Donette Chin-Loy Chang

Personal details
- Born: 1955 (age 70–71)
- Education: University of Toronto (BA); York University (MBA)
- Occupation: Business executive, University chancellor
- Known for: Former CFO of RBC, Founding chairperson of the Canada Infrastructure Bank, Chancellor of Toronto Metropolitan University

Janice R. Fukakusa CM (born 1955) is a Canadian business executive and was chancellor of Toronto Metropolitan University from 2018 to 2024. She was both the chief financial officer and the chief administrative officer of the Royal Bank of Canada for 8 years. Following her retirement from the bank in 2017 after a 31-year career, she was appointed to 15 corporate, non-profit or government boards. She was notably the Canada Infrastructure Bank's founding chairperson, a position she held from 2017 to 2020.

== Early life and education ==
Janice Fukakusa was born in 1955 in a family of 8 children. Her parents were Japanese immigrants to Canada, and her father was an entrepreneur. Her first job was as a cashier at a dry cleaning business.

Fukakusa studied at the University of Toronto where she received a Bachelor of Arts in political science and philosophy. She then studied to become a chartered accountant and obtained a Master of Business Administration at York University's Schulich School of Business in 1979.

== Career ==
=== PricewaterhouseCoopers (PWC) ===
After her studies, Janice Fukakusa worked in the auditing then business valuation departments of PricewaterhouseCoopers. She describes the latter job as a "pretty good springboard for me into the financial services and banking sector".

=== RBC ===
In 1985, Fukakusa started to work at the Royal Bank of Canada (RBC) in mergers and acquisitions. Over the years, she worked in retail banking, corporate finance, business banking and treasury within RBC. In 2004, she was appointed chief financial officer of the bank, and also became chief administrative officer in 2009. She says that, in these roles, she worked to diversify the upper echelons of the bank to include more women and people of diverse backgrounds, and coached multiple women to take leadership roles at RBC.

In 2007, Fukakusa was inducted into Canada's Most Powerful Women Hall of Fame. In 2013, Fukakusa took part in the administration of RBC's acquisition of Ally Canada, the Canadian operations of Ally Financial, which were fully integrated into RBC. In 2014, she was nominated as Canada's CFO of the Year by Financial Executives Canada, PricewaterhouseCoopers and Robert Half. That year, she earned C$4.96 million in compensation excluding pension, the highest she made in one year.

For four consecutive years from 2013 to 2016, the American Banker magazine named Fukakusa one of the 25 Most Powerful Women in Banking. She retired from RBC on January 31, 2017, after a 31-year career at the bank. Upon her retirement, she was Canada's highest-paid female banking executive, with revenues of C$4.67 million in 2016.

== Board member ==
Following her retirement from RBC, Janice Fukakusa has been part of 15 corporate, non-profit and government boards.

=== Canada Infrastructure Bank ===
In July 2017, Fukakusa became the founding chairperson of the board of directors of the Canada Infrastructure Bank (CIB). She says she "spent a lot of the first six months just setting up base infrastructure, premises, governance in place, all of that". She also took part in selecting the rest of the board of directors, executives, and investment staff.

The CIB came under heavy criticism during Fukakusa's tenure as chairperson of the bank. Some right-wing groups criticized its slow approval process, while left-wing organisations objected to its mandate of promoting public–private partnerships. Both the Conservative Party and the New Democratic Party, Canada's two main opposition parties, promised to wind it down if they were elected in the 2019 Canadian federal election. That fall, Fukakusa announced her intention to step down from the bank leadership. She eventually left the CIB in April 2020.

=== Toronto Metropolitan University ===
In 2018, Janice Fukakusa became Ryerson University's fifth chancellor, the first woman in that position. Under her chancellorship, the university changed its name to Toronto Metropolitan University in 2022. She completed her tenure in September 2024.

=== Other ===
As of 2021, Janice Fukakusa is notably part of the board of directors of Loblaw Companies, Brookfield Asset Management, RioCan Real Estate Investment Trust, the Schulich School of Business and Cineplex Entertainment. In the latter position, she earns C$120,000 per year as the Independent Director of Cineplex.

== Notes ==
Preceded by Position created	Chairperson of the Canada Infrastructure Bank; July 2017 – April 2020	Succeeded by Michael Sabia

Academic offices
Preceded by Lawrence Bloomberg	Chancellor of Ryerson University/Toronto Metropolitan University; 2018–2024	Succeeded by Donette Chin-Loy Chang
