= Partnerships UK =

Partnerships UK plc (PUK) was a centralized unit responsible for furthering public-private partnerships in the United Kingdom. It was a public limited company formed in 2000, owned jointly by HM Treasury and the private sector. It ceased activity in 2011.

== Origins ==
In July 1997 a Private Finance Initiative (PFI) taskforce was established within the Treasury to provide central co-ordination for the roll-out of PFI. Known as the Treasury Taskforce (TTF), its main responsibilities were to standardise the procurement process and train staff throughout government in the ways of PFI, especially in the private finance units of other government departments. The TTF initially consisted of a policy arm staffed by five civil servants, and a projects section employing eight private sector executives led by Adrian Montague, formally co-head of Global Project Finance at investment bank Dresdner Kleinwort. In 1999 the policy arm of TTF was moved to the Office of Government Commerce (OGC), but it was subsequently moved back to the Treasury.

== Formation of Partnerships UK ==
The projects section of the TTF was part-privatised and became Partnerships UK (PUK) in 2000. The Treasury retained a 49% 'golden share' in PUK managed by the Shareholder Executive, while the majority stake in the company was owned by private sector investors. PUK was staffed almost entirely by private sector procurement specialists such as corporate lawyers, investment bankers and consultants. It took the lead role in promoting PFI and other public–private partnership variants within government, and was in control of the policy's day-to-day implementation.

== Closure ==
In June 2010, Infrastructure UK (IUK) was established as a separate unit within the Treasury to work alongside the private sector on major infrastructure projects. As a result, it was announced in May 2011 that PUK was to be dissolved. Some PUK assets, services, data and staff moved to IUK and Local Partnerships (a joint venture between PUK and the Local Government Association) with other assets being sold during 2011.

== See also ==
- Partnerships for Health
- Partnerships for Schools
