= Tamara Vrooman =

Canadian businesswoman

Tamara Vrooman OBC
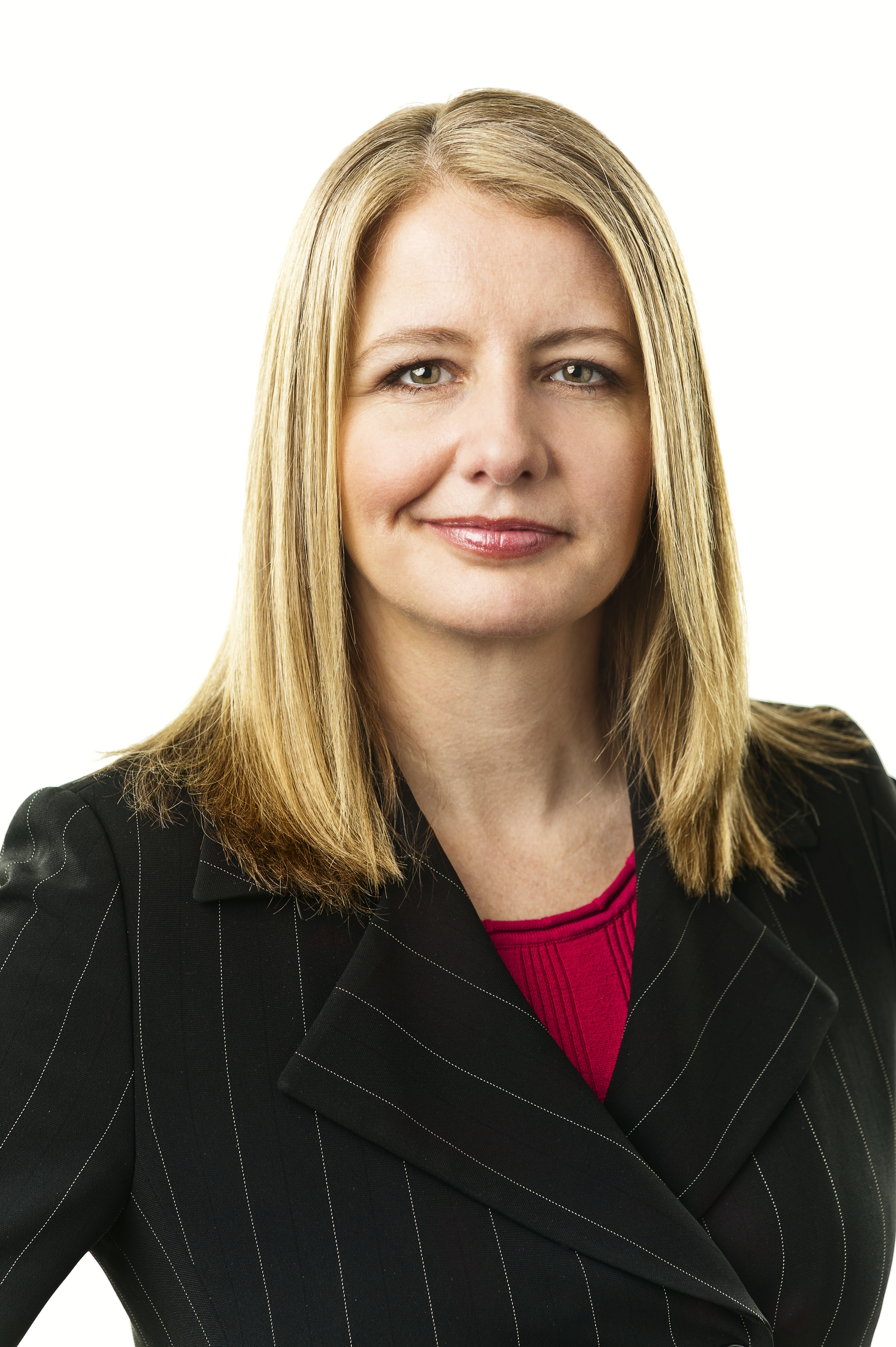
- Vrooman in 2016
- Born: June 1968 (age 58); Victoria, British Columbia, Canada
- Education: University of Victoria
- Occupations: Business executive, university chancellor
- Years active: 2004–2007 (Deputy minister); 2007–present
- Known for: Former CEO of Vancity Credit Union
- Spouse: Gregg
- Children: 1

Tamara Rowanne Vrooman, OBC (born June 1968), is a Canadian businesswoman and civil servant. From 2007 until July 2020, she was the CEO of Vancity Credit Union. In May 2020, Vrooman left Vancity to accept a position as the president and CEO of Vancouver International Airport and the 12th chancellor of Simon Fraser University. Vrooman was British Columbia's first and youngest female deputy minister of Finance. Additionally, she was the chairperson of the Canada Infrastructure Bank from 2021 to 2024.

== Early life ==
Vrooman was born in Victoria, British Columbia, in June 1968. She attended Kamloops High School, where she played string bass for the school band.

== Career ==
In 1992, Vrooman attempted to earn a position with the British Columbia's Ministry of Finance but was rejected because her interviewers assumed she had poor mathematical skills. As a result, she enrolled at the University of Victoria where she took finance courses. Twelve years later, she became British Columbia's first and youngest female deputy minister of finance. While in this role, she won the 2007 Knowledge and Leadership Award from the Association of Women in Finance and the 2003 Queen's Golden Jubilee Medal for outstanding contributions to B.C.'s public service. She also became the first deputy minister in B.C. to take maternity leave.

Vrooman stayed in her role as Deputy Minister of Finance for three years before leaving in 2007 to become CEO of Vancity Credit Union. She replaced Dave Mowat, who had held the position for seven years. The following year, Vancity became the first carbon-neutral credit union in North America. During the 2010 fiscal year, Vancity hit a financial high and Vrooman was named Canada's most powerful woman in the corporate executives category by the Women's Executive Network. By 2011, Vancity became the largest Canadian organization to adopt a living wage policy and she was appointed to sit on the Board of Vancouver Airport Authority. Vrooman received a 2011 YWCA Women of Distinction Award and was also honoured with a Distinguished Alumni Award from the UVic Alumni Association.

As CEO and president of Vancity, Vrooman helped develop and chair Canada's first Schedule 1 bank focused on impact in the Greater Toronto Area, called the Vancity Community Investment Bank. In 2016, Simon Fraser University honoured her with an honorary degree of Doctor of Laws. By 2018, she was selected by the Federal Government to co-chair a panel on climate change. A year later, she was the recipient of the Order of British Columbia for "contributing to a better quality of life in B.C. and beyond." She was also awarded the 2019 PEAK Award from the Association of Women in Finance.

In May 2020, it was announced that Vrooman would be leaving her role at Vancity to become the new president and CEO of Vancouver International Airport, effective July 1. In June, she was named the 12th chancellor of SFU. While in these roles, she was appointed chair of the Canada Infrastructure Bank (CIB) in January 2021. This position is a Governor in Council appointment made of the advice of the minister of infrastructure and communities. She left the CIB board in January 2024.

Preceded by Michael Sabia	Chairperson of the Canada Infrastructure Bank; January 27, 2021 - Present	Succeeded by Jane Bird (interim)
