= Lake Erie Connector =

Planned electrical transmission connection between Ontario and Pennsylvania

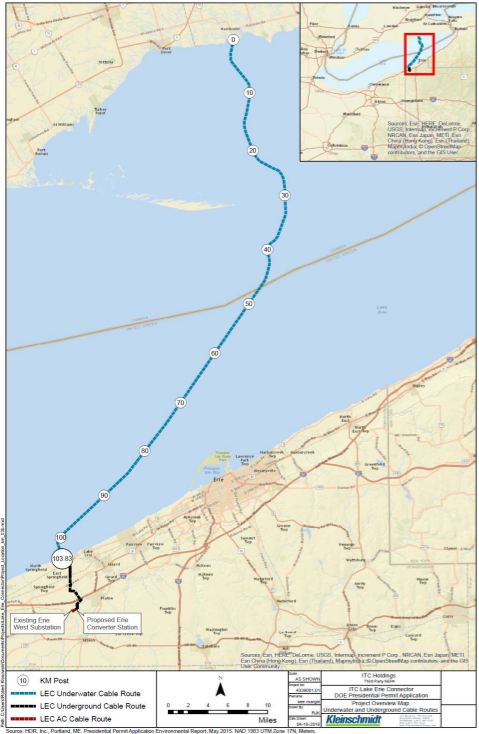
- Map of Lake Erie Connector

Location
- Country: Canada; United States
- From: Nanticoke, Ontario
- To: Erie, Pennsylvania

Ownership information
- Owner: NextEra Energy

Technical information
- Current type: HVDC
- Total length: 117 km (73 mi)
- Capacity: 1000 MW

The Lake Erie Connector is a planned underwater electric transmission line that would run under Lake Erie to connect the power grids of the Canadian province of Ontario with the American state of Pennsylvania. The 117 kilometres (73 mi) high-voltage direct current line will carry up to 1000 MW and run from Nanticoke, Ontario to Erie County, Pennsylvania.

The connector is budgeted at US$1 billion.

Energy planners first started to work on the project in 2004.

The Lake Erie Connector will use high-voltage DC technology and will be completely buried under the lake bed. NextEra Energy Transmission claims that the project would enhance grid reliability, increase access to renewable energy sources and create economic benefits for both regions.

However, on July 26, 2022, ITC Investment Holdings Inc. decided to "suspend all project development activities and commercial negotiations on the Lake Erie Connector project."

In early 2024, NextEra Energy acquired the rights to the project, and the Canada Infrastructure Bank invested another C$655 million into the project. The head of the Canada Infrastructure Bank has made statements that the project is still "very viable," and they "still think it will get built."
