= Auditor General of Quebec =

Canadian Provincial government accountability agency

- Vérificateur général du Québec
- Incumbent; Guylaine Leclerc since February 26, 2015
- Abbreviation: VGC
- Reports to: National Assembly of Quebec
- Appointer: Governor in Council
- Term length: 10 years non-renewable
- Constituting instrument: Auditor General Act
- Formation: 1868
- First holder: Gaspard Drolet

Office of the Auditor General of Quebec
- Bureau du Vérificateur général du Québec

Agency overview
- Formed: 1868
- Headquarters: Quebec, Quebec, Canada
- Employees: 299
- Annual budget: $28.04 million (2017)
- Website: https://vgq.qc.ca

The role of the Auditor General of Quebec (fr:Vérificateur général du Québec) is to aid accountability by conducting independent audits of Quebec provincial government operations. The office was created in 1868. Guylaine Leclerc is Quebec's current auditor general.

== Office ==
The Auditor General is appointed by the National Assembly of Quebec for a 10-year term.

On February 26, 2015, Members of the National Assembly of Quebec unanimously approved a motion to nominate Guylaine Leclerc as Quebec's new auditor General for a 10-year term. This term started on March 16, 2015.

The previous auditor general of Québec was Renaud Lachance. His term spanned from June 16, 2004 to November 30, 2011. Michel Samson was interim auditor general from November 30, 2011 to March 12, 2015.

== See also ==
- Auditor General of Canada
