= Michael Sabia =

Canadian public servant

Michael Sabia OC

26th Clerk of the Privy Council Secretary to the Cabinet
- Incumbent
- Assumed office July 7, 2025
- Prime Minister: Mark Carney
- Preceded by: John Hannaford

Deputy Minister for the Department of Finance Canada
- In office December 14, 2020 – September 11, 2023
- Prime Minister: Justin Trudeau
- Minister: Chrystia Freeland
- Preceded by: Paul Rochon
- Succeeded by: Chris Forbes

Personal details
- Born: Michael John Sabia; September 11, 1953 (age 73) St. Catharines, Ontario, Canada
- Spouse: Hilary Pearson
- Parent(s): Michael Joseph Sabia; Laura Sabia
- Education: Ridley College; University of Toronto (BA); Yale University (MPhil)
- Occupation: Businessman and civil servant

Michael John Sabia (born September 11, 1953) is a Canadian businessman and public servant who has been the 26th clerk of the Privy Council since July 7, 2025.

Sabia has served in a number of senior public sector roles including as CEO of Caisse de dépôt et placement du Québec (2009–2020), deputy minister for the Department of Finance Canada (2020–2023) and CEO of Hydro-Québec (2023–2025). Sabia began his career in the federal public service in the 1980s, having served as deputy secretary to the cabinet (plans). He has also held senior roles in the private sector as CEO of Bell Canada Enterprises and CFO of CN Railway. Sabia was director of the Munk School of Global Affairs and remains a distinguished fellow at the school. On June 11, 2025, Prime Minister Mark Carney announced that Sabia would become clerk of the Privy Council effective July 7.

== Personal life ==
Born in St. Catharines, Ontario, Sabia is the son of Michael Joseph Sabia and Laura Sabia (née Villela); both of his parents are of Italian descent. He attended Ridley College in St. Catharines. Sabia received his undergraduate education from the University of Toronto, and he earned his graduate degree at Yale University.

His wife, Hilary Pearson, is the granddaughter of former Prime Minister Lester B. Pearson. In 2016, Sabia was appointed as an Officer of the Order of Canada.

== Career ==
=== Early federal and private sector career ===
Sabia held a number of senior positions in Canada's federal public service during the 1980s and early 1990s, including Deputy Secretary to the Cabinet of the Privy Council Office. When Clerk of the Privy Council Paul Tellier left the public service in the early 1990s to assume the presidency of Canadian National Railway, then a Crown corporation, he subsequently persuaded Sabia to join the company as it underwent privatization. Sabia held a number of executive positions at Canadian National Railway during the 1990s, including the position of chief financial officer.

He left Canadian National Railway to join Bell Canada Enterprises (BCE) in 1999 and became chief executive in 2002, succeeding Jean Monty. In 2007, the BCE board of directors accepted an offer from the Ontario Teachers' Pension Plan to privatize the telecommunications company. Later that year, Sabia said he would leave Bell after the privatization deal was finalized. Sabia left Bell in July 2008 and was succeeded by George Cope.

=== Later roles ===
On March 13, 2009, Sabia was named president and chief executive officer of Caisse de dépôt et placement du Québec (CDPQ), succeeding Fernand Perrault. On February 15, 2017, CDPQ announced that Sabia's mandate was renewed until March 31, 2021. Bloomberg said in 2019 that "under Sabia's tenure, the Caisse dove into international markets. About 64% of the fund, which manages the pension savings for the province of Quebec, is now in global markets versus 36% in 2009."

Sabia was a member of the Canadian Government's Advisory Council on Economic Growth, which advised the Canadian finance minister on economic policies to achieve long-term sustainable growth. In 2016, the council called for a gradual increase in permanent immigration to Canada to 450,000 people a year.

On November 12, 2019, it was announced that Sabia would be leaving CDPQ to become head of the Munk School of Global Affairs and Public Policy at the University of Toronto, ending his term at CDPQ a year early. He started the new role in February 2020. Sabia was replaced as head of CDPQ by Charles Emond in January 2020.

In April 2020, Sabia was appointed as Chairperson of the Canada Infrastructure Bank. In June 2020, he was named to the board of directors of the Mastercard Foundation.

On December 6, 2020, it was announced that Sabia would replace Paul Rochon as Deputy Minister of the federal Department of Finance. On January 27, 2021, Tamara Vrooman was appointed to succeed Sabia as Chairperson of the Canada Infrastructure Bank.

On May 23, 2023 Sabia was named as the next CEO of Hydro-Québec, the province of Quebec's public electrical utility, replacing Sophie Brochu in that role.

=== Clerk of the Privy Council ===
On June 11, 2025, Prime Minister Mark Carney announced that Sabia would join the Government of Canada as clerk of the privy council on July 7. He left Hydro-Québec on July 4.

== See also ==
- Réseau express métropolitain

Preceded by Janice Fukakusa	Chairperson of the Canada Infrastructure Bank; April 2020 – January 2021	Succeeded by Tamara Vrooman
