= Partnerships BC =

Partnerships British Columbia
- Company type: Crown Corporation
- Industry: Public infrastructure
- Founded: 2002; 24 years ago
- Headquarters: Vancouver, British Columbia, Canada
- Area served: British Columbia
- Key people: Dana hayden (Chair); Marc Liedemann (President and CEO)
- Website: www.partnershipsbc.ca

Partnerships BC is British Columbia's public-private partnership unit. It is a Crown Corporation, wholly owned by the Government of British Columbia. Created in 2002, it is governed by a board of directors reporting to its sole shareholder, the Minister of Finance. It is incorporated under the British Columbia Business Corporations Act. Its threefold mandate is to facilitate the development of public-private partnerships infrastructure projects in BC, to advise the government on whether to use these partnerships and finally to evaluate their value for money.

Some examples of projects facilitated by Partnerships BC include the Canada Line rapid transit line, the Abbotsford Hospital and Cancer Centre and the Sea-to-Sky Highway project.

Partnership BC charges work fees to government departments, and its services are mandatory for public infrastructure projects in BC. Because it require P3s for its existence, does policy promotion and evaluation, and charge a user fee, Partnership BC has an incentive to recommend departments to use the P3 model. Additionally, Partnership BC operates more like a business than a government agency. As per example, they refer to other government agencies and ministries as its "clients".

Partnership BC had a mini-scandal when it was revealed they were paying their executive staff well above the public sector's standard pay rate. The government justified this discrepancy by stating the high salaries were necessary for enticing professionals with financial experience to work for them.

== Major projects ==
- Abbotsford Regional Hospital and Cancer Centre
- Brittania Mine Water Treatment Plant
- Canada Line
- Critical Care Tower, Surrey Memorial Hospital
- Jim Pattison Surgery and Outpatient Care Centre (Surrey, British Columbia)
- Port Mann/Highway 1 Improvement Project
- Sea to Sky Highway
- Surrey Pretrial Services Centre Expansion Project

== See also ==
Public-private partnerships in Canada
