= Laura Sabia =

Canadian social activist and feminist

- Born: Laura Villela; September 18, 1916; Montreal, Quebec, Canada
- Died: October 17, 1996 (aged 80); Toronto, Ontario, Canada
- Known for: Social activist and feminist
- Spouse: Michael Joseph Sabia
- Children: 4, including Michael John Sabia

Laura Sabia, OC (September 18, 1916 – October 17, 1996) was a Canadian social activist and feminist.

She was born Laura Villela in Montreal, Quebec, the daughter of Italian immigrants. As the national chair of the Committee for the Equality of Women, she played an important part in the creation of the Royal Commission on the Status of Women called by Prime Minister Lester B. Pearson in February 1967. Sabia received her education at Villa-Marie Convent and McGill University. While in Montreal, Laura was noted as the first female to be a part of St. Catharines Separate School Board in 1953, additionally being the president of multiple disciplines including YMCA and the Community Lecture Series. She was a founding member and the first president of the National Action Committee on the Status of Women. She was an alderman for St. Catharines City Council from 1963 to 1968 and wrote columns for The Toronto Sun in the 1970s and 1980s. She also held the president position at the Canadian Federation of University Women and used her position to reach and inspire woman into pursuing higher education politics. Sabia's contribution continued onto 1975 when she and 10 other women participated in a project for International Women at the United Nations Conference.

Sabia was a two-time candidate for the Progressive Conservative Party of Canada. In the 1968 general election, she finished second in the riding of St. Catharines, Ontario, losing by fewer than 4,000 votes, and came in third in a 1981 by-election in the Toronto riding of Spadina, losing by 1,005 votes.

In 1974, she was made an Officer of the Order of Canada "for her devoted service to the cause of the status of women". In 1983, she was awarded the Governor General's Awards in Commemoration of the Persons Case.

She was married to Michael Sabia and had four children, including Michael John, former head of Bell Canada Enterprises, who is married to Hilary Pearson, the granddaughter of former Prime Minister Lester Pearson.

She died of Parkinson's disease on October 17, 1996, in Toronto, Ontario.
