= PPP Canada =

Crown corporation in Canada, 2009–2018

- Company type: Crown corporation
- Founded: 2009
- Defunct: 2018
- Area served: Canada
- Operating income: $14,207,000 (2017)
- Total assets: $1,277,842,000 (2017)
- Owner: Government of Canada

PPP Canada (Public-Private Partnerships Canada) (French: Partenariats Public-Privés Canada) was a Crown Corporation responsible for promoting and facilitating Public-private partnerships (PPP, P3), operating under Housing, Infrastructure and Communities Canada. It was created under Prime Minister Stephen Harper to highlight the commitment of the federal government to P3 infrastructure. PPP Canada managed the “P3 Canada fund” where provinces, territories, and municipalities could apply for funding from the federal government.

PPP Canada served as Canada's centralized PPP Unit from its creation in 2009 until it was dissolved in 2018 under Prime Minister Justin Trudeau. Six of the ten Canadian provinces created similar PPP Units, and PPP Canada was meant to serve the same role for provinces that did not have their own P3 Unit. These agencies were created in response to criticisms of P3 projects in the 1990s and early 2000s, that were characterized by an overtly political selection process, lack of rigorous assessment of their effectiveness, and lack of public sector expertise to manage them. As such, PPP Canada staffed with professionals linked to private sector law, consultancy, business management, accountancy and finance firms. They were also given the responsibility to make value-for money assessments of P3 projects.

== Public-private partnership ==
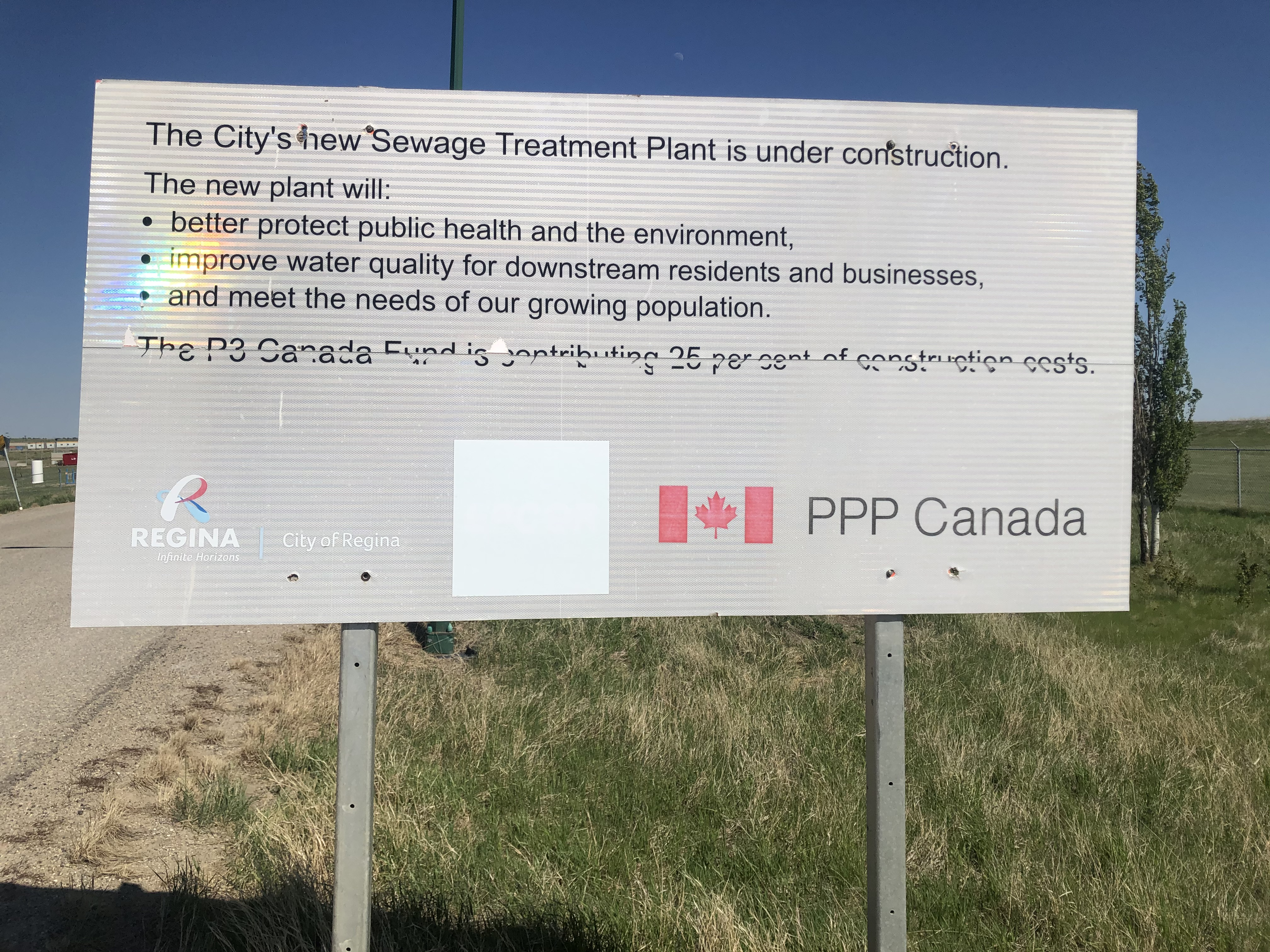
Sign at the entrance of the Regina Wastewater Treatment Plant

PPP Canada's definition of Public-private partnership was "a long-term performance-based approach to procuring public infrastructure where the private sector assumes a major share of the risks in terms of financing and construction and ensuring effective performance of the infrastructure, from design and planning, to long-term maintenance".

PPP Canada explicitly outlined when P3s were the "right alternative" for certain projects. Their arguments for recommending P3s were that funding project with the private sector's higher cost of capital was justified through calculations of risk, expectations, efficiency, innovation and value for money analysis. In Ontario, a 2012 review of 28 projects showed that the costs were on average 16% lower for traditional publicly procured projects than for PPPs.

== Criticism ==
PPP Canada had been criticized for structuring its assessment methodologies with a bias in favour of PPP. Because promoting PPPs was part of their mandate, and they were staffed with people with a vested interest in the implementation of P3s, there was an apparent conflict of interest with their project assessments .

== Dissolution ==
In 2018, the Government of Canada dissolved PPP Canada. Minister of Infrastructure and Communities Amarjeet Sohi justified this decision by claiming that it had achieved its mandate of making P3s common practice across Canada, and was no longer needed.
