= Housing, Infrastructure and Communities Canada =

Government department

Department overview
- Formed: 2002
- Employees: 701 (2020–2021)
- Annual budget: CA$5.5 billion (2020–2021)
- Minister responsible: Gregor Robertson, Minister of Housing, Infrastructure and Communities
- Deputy Minister responsible: Paul Halucha, Deputy Minister of Housing, Infrastructure and Communities Canada
- Parent organization: Government of Canada
- Website: infrastructure.gc.ca

Housing, Infrastructure and Communities Canada (HICC; French: Logement, Infrastructures et Collectivités Canada; formerly known as Infrastructure Canada or INFC) (Note: Infrastructure Canada is the applied title under the Federal Identity Program; the legal title is Department of Housing, Infrastructure and Communities (French: Ministère du Logement, de l’Infrastructure et des Collectivités).) is a department of the Government of Canada responsible for the federal public infrastructure policy. Construction and development of infrastructure is primarily the responsibility of provincial/territorial and municipal governments, as such, much of the department's work involves co-financing projects with other levels of government.

The department is responsible to Parliament through the minister of housing, infrastructure and communities.

== History ==
The Office of Infrastructure of Canada (Infrastructure Canada) was created as a federal department in 2002 via an Order in Council issued pursuant to the Financial Administration Act. The department was mandated to enter into funding agreements with Canada's provinces, territories and municipalities for the purpose of supporting strategic infrastructure projects across Canada.

There are two programs managed by the department that have their own federal legislation: the Canada Strategic Infrastructure Fund, and the Canada Community-Building Fund (formerly the Gas Tax Fund).

On June 20, 2024, with the passing of Bill C-59, Infrastructure Canada was renamed Housing, Infrastructure and Communities Canada.

=== Programs ===
Infrastructure Canada is the lead federal department responsible for infrastructure policy development and program delivery. The department makes investments for both local and regional infrastructure needs. In the first year after its creation, the department invested mostly in water and wastewater plants, highways, culture, recreation, and broadband projects.

During the Great Recession, the department was tasked with implementing the Harper government's economic stimulus package.

In January 2016 the Trudeau government announced a two-year, $10 billion plan to repair infrastructure across the country.

== Branches and sub-agencies ==
The Department is made up of seven branches:

- The Policy and Results Branch
- The Communities and Infrastructure Programs Branch
- The Housing and Homelessness Branch
- The Corporate Services Branch
- The Audit and Evaluation Branch
- The Communications Branch
- The Investment, Partnerships and Innovation Branch

Some of the sub-agencies of the Department include:

- Windsor-Detroit Bridge Authority
- Waterfront Toronto
- Build Canada Homes
- Jacques Cartier Bridges Incorporated
- PPP Canada (from 2009 to 2018)
