= Local Partnerships =

Local Partnerships LLP is joint venture owned by HM Treasury, the Local Government Association and Welsh Government established 2009. It serves as a Public-private partnership unit in England and Wales. As an in-house public sector delivery partner they work solely for central government departments, The Welsh Government, Councils and Combined Authorities.

Local Partnerships' experience of working with both national and local government gives their clients a unique insight into current best practice and market intelligence from around the UK, improving their chances of success.

The current Chair is Keith Fraser, who was appointed in 2022. The Chief Executive is Adele Gritten.

== Climate work ==
Local Partnerships’ climate work supports the public sector to

- deliver strategic and practical approaches to achieve net-zero
- plan for a changing climate, by assessing local impacts and necessary changes
- deliver renewable energy infrastructure and energy efficiency projects
- develop and deliver to minimise waste and facilitate a circular economy

It is funded by fee income from chargeable services and money 'top-sliced' from local authorities' Revenue Support Grant (RSG) payments from the UK government, grant funding from UK government departments such as Defra and MHCLG.

Local Partnerships and the Greater London Authority are responsible for the operation of the Re:fit 4 programme which is a procurement initiative for public bodies wishing to implement energy efficiency measures and local energy generation projects on their assets. The Re:fit framework will be operational until April 2024.

Local Partnerships has a team of PFI specialists who provide support to contracts across the full range of financial, technical and legal specialisms, particularly as the contracts come to an end or may benefit from refinancing.
