= Infrastructure Investment Facilitation Company =

Bangladeshi public-private partnership development agency

Infrastructure Investment Facilitation Company (IIFC)
- Formation: 1999
- Headquarters: Dhaka, Bangladesh
- Region served: Bangladesh
- Official language: Bengali
- Website: www.iifc.gov.bd

The Infrastructure Investment Facilitation Company (IIFC) (Bengali: অবকাঠামো বিনিয়োগ সুবিধা সংস্থা) is a Bangladesh government company that acts as an advisory body under the Economic Relations Division of the Ministry of Finance. Md. Shahriar Kader Siddiky is the chairperson and Md. Moniruzzaman is the managing director of the company.

== History ==
Infrastructure Investment Facilitation Company was established in 1999 under the Companies Act of 1994. The purpose of the IIFC is to encourage and support public-private partnership (3P) in Bangladesh. The company provides consultancy services to public agencies and projects regarding the development of infrastructure to encourage private investments.

In 2004, M Saifur Rahman, Minister of Finance and Planning, criticized the Infrastructure Development Company Limited and Infrastructure Investment Facilitation Center for failing to properly encourage investment. It signed an agreement with Power Grid Company of Bangladesh to lease out the fiber optic cable from Chittagong to Dhaka.

According to a 2008 study, the IIFC suffered from a lack of formal or informal power, and so was involved in less than half of the 3P projects developed in the country.

In 2010, the Infrastructure Investment Facilitation Company was hired by Bangladesh Bridge Authority to provide an estimated cost of Dhaka Elevated Expressway. The previous consultant, AECOM Australia Propriety Ltd, had provided estimate that Bangladesh Bridge Authority thought was too high.

On 29 March 2021, Abdul Baki, additional secretary in charge of World Bank Wing at the Ministry of Finance, was appointed managing director of Infrastructure Investment Facilitation Company. It supported Bangladesh Railway in creating the draft Bangladesh Railway Amendment Act.

== Board of directors ==
Name	Position	Reference
Md. Shahriar Kader Siddiky	Chairman	
Md. Habibur Rahman	Director	
Mirana Mahrukh	Director	
Mahbubul Alam	Director	
A. K. M. Nurul Fazal Bulbul	Director	
Golam Mainuddin	Director	
AKM Fazlul Haque	Director	
