= Minister of Housing and Infrastructure (Canada) =

Minister in the Canadian Cabinet

- Ministre du Logement et de l'Infrastructure
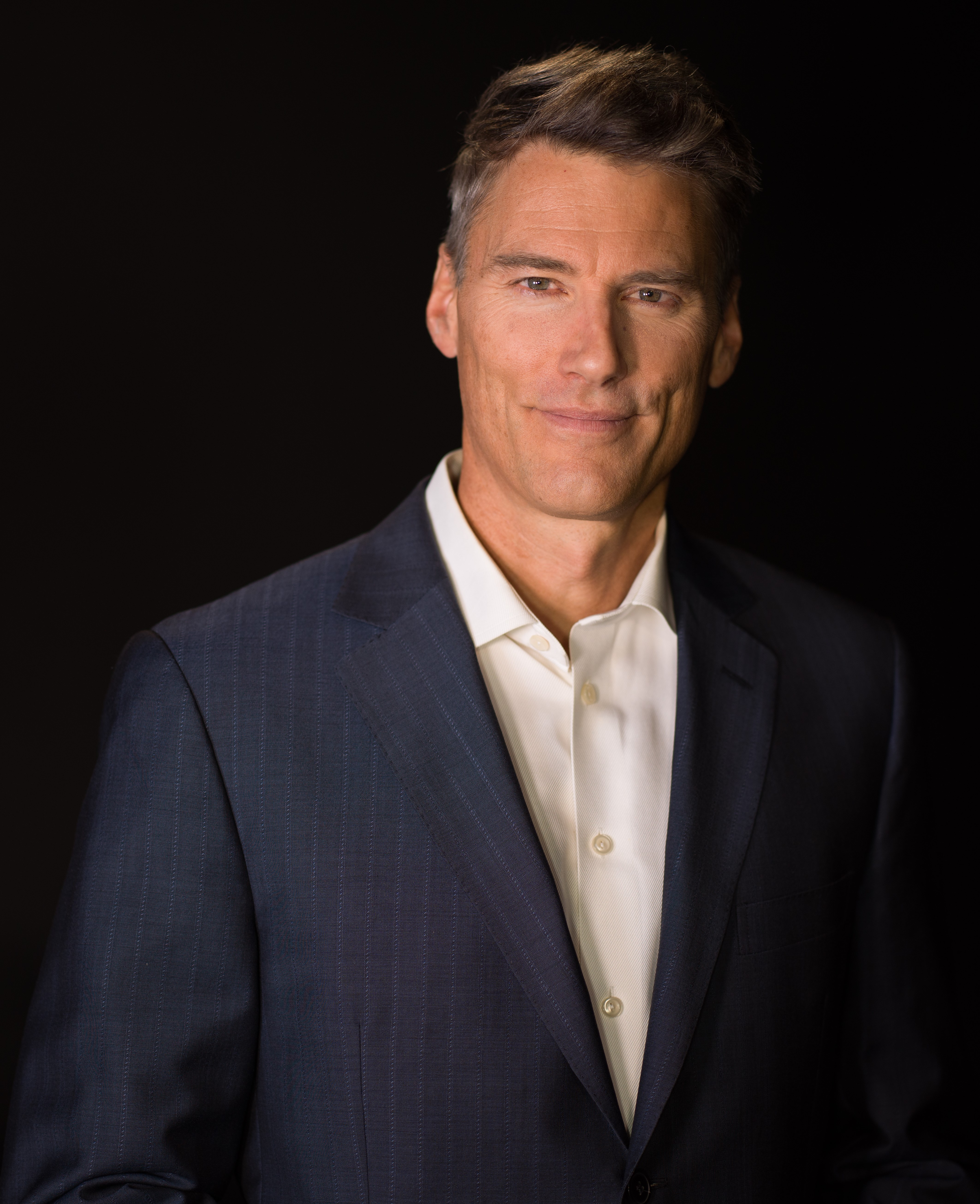
- Incumbent; Gregor Robertson since May 13, 2025
- Housing, Infrastructure and Communities Canada
- Style: The Honourable
- Member of: Cabinet; Privy Council
- Appointer: Governor General of Canada
- Term length: At His Majesty's pleasure
- Inaugural holder: Amarjeet Sohi
- Formation: 4 November 2015
- Salary: $299,900 (2024)
- Website: www.infrastructure.gc.ca

The minister of housing and infrastructure (French: ministre du logement et de l'infrastructure) is the minister of the Crown responsible for the Department of Housing, Infrastructure and Communities, as well as several agencies including the Canada Mortgage and Housing Corporation and the Canada Infrastructure Bank. The minister is a member of the King's Privy Council for Canada and the Canadian Cabinet.

Gregor Robertson has been the minister of housing and infrastructure since May 13, 2025. The minister is selected by the prime minister and appointed by the Crown. The role has had several titles in the past, including most recently, Minister of Housing, Infrastructure and Communities from 2023 to 2025, and Minister of Infrastructure and Communities from 2015 to 2023.

== Portfolio ==
The minister is responsible for several federal organizations including:

- Housing, Infrastructure and Communities Canada
- Canada Mortgage and Housing Corporation (CMHC)
- Canada Infrastructure Bank (CIB)
- Toronto Waterfront Revitalization Initiative (Waterfront Toronto; in partnership with the Province of Ontario and City of Toronto)
- Jacques Cartier and Champlain Bridges Incorporated
- Windsor–Detroit Bridge Authority

== History ==
From 2006 to 2013, infrastructure and communities was the responsibility of the Minister of Transport, which was informally styled Minister of Transport, Infrastructure, and Communities. From 2013 to 2015, infrastructure and communities was the responsibility of the Minister of Intergovernmental Affairs, then styled Minister of Infrastructure, Communities and Intergovernmental Affairs. (Technically, the portfolios of infrastructure and intergovernmental affairs were both the responsibility of the President of the Queen's Privy Council for Canada). From 2015 to 2021, during the 29th Canadian Ministry, the portfolio was assigned its own ministry. From 2021 to 2023, during the 29th Canadian Ministry, the portfolio was given back to the Minister of Intergovernmental Affairs. However, the portfolio was assigned its own ministry in 2023, and the housing portfolio was also merged into this ministry, styled as Minister of Housing, Infrastructure and Communities, with Sean Fraser as the minister.

== List of ministers ==
Key:

Liberal Party of Canada

No.	Portrait	Name	Term of office		Political party	Ministry
Minister of Infrastructure and Communities
1		Amarjeet Sohi	November 4, 2015	July 18, 2018	Liberal	29 (J. Trudeau)
2		François-Philippe Champagne	July 18, 2018	November 20, 2019	Liberal	29 (J. Trudeau)
3		Catherine McKenna	November 20, 2019	October 26, 2021	Liberal	29 (J. Trudeau)
Responsibilities handed back to the Minister of Intergovernmental Affairs, Infrastructure and Communities
Minister of Housing, Infrastructure and Communities
4		Sean Fraser	July 26, 2023	December 20, 2024	Liberal	29 (J. Trudeau)
5		Nate Erskine-Smith	December 20, 2024	March 14, 2025	Liberal	29 (J. Trudeau)
5		Nate Erskine-Smith	March 14, 2025	May 13, 2025	Liberal	30 (Carney)
Minister of Housing and Infrastructure
6		Gregor Robertson	May 13, 2025	present	Liberal	30 (Carney)

== See also ==
- Housing, Infrastructure and Communities Canada
