= Hizen-Nagata Station =

Railway station in Isahaya, Nagasaki Prefecture, Japan

Hizen-Nagata Station 肥前長田駅
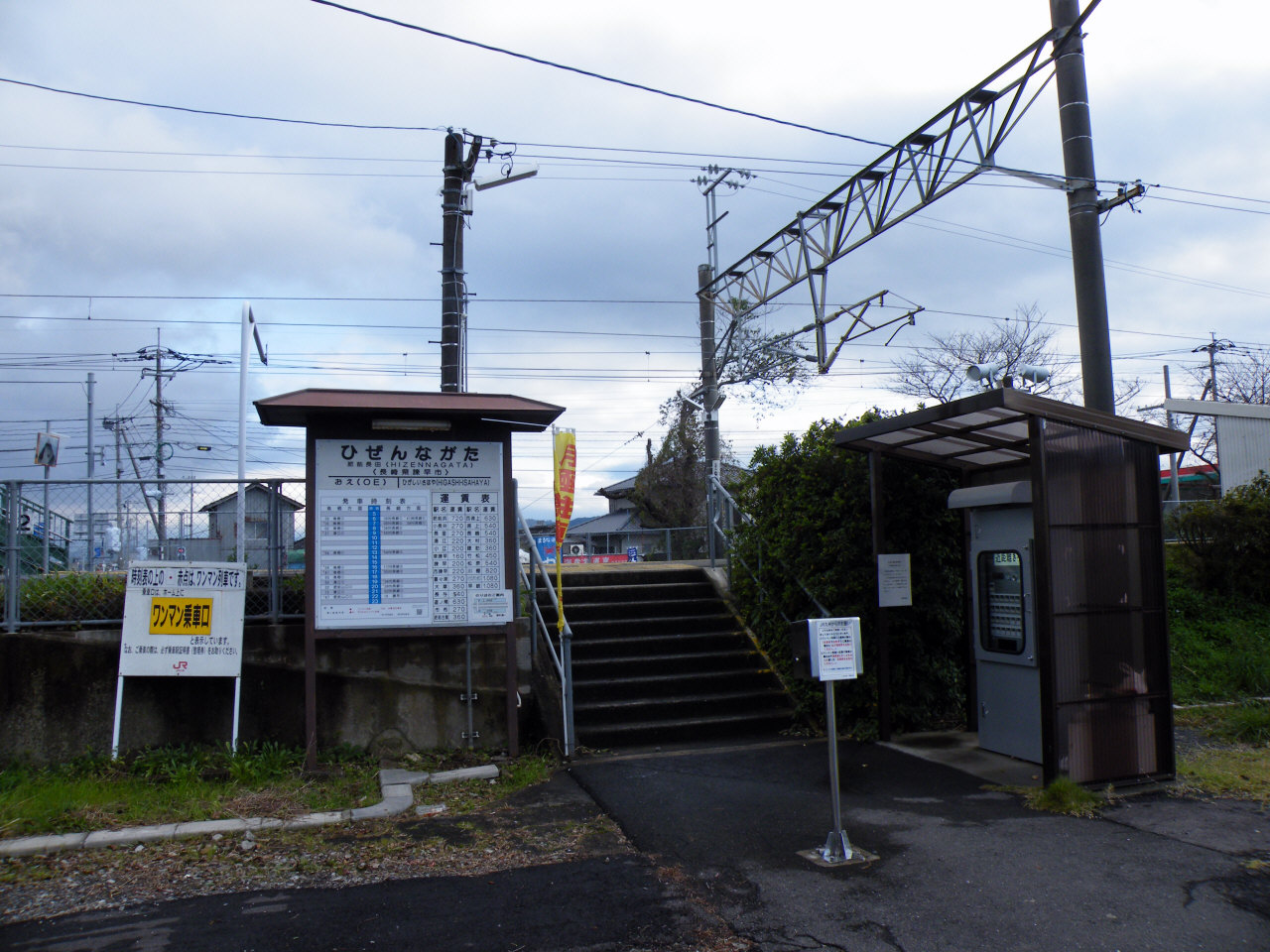
- Hizen-Nagata Station in 2008

General information
- Location: Nagatamachi, Isahaya-shi, Nagasaki-ken 859-0301; Japan
- Coordinates: 32°51′42″N 130°04′49″E
- Operator: JR Kyushu
- Line: JH Nagasaki Main Line
- Distance: 95.6 km from Tosu
- Platforms: 2 side platforms
- Tracks: 2 + 1 siding

Construction
- Structure type: At grade
- Accessible: No - platforms linked by footbridge

Other information
- Status: Unstaffed
- Website: Official website

History
- Opened: 24 March 1934

Passengers
- FY2014: 135 daily

Services
Preceding station	JR Kyushu	Following station
Higashi-Isahaya towards Nagasaki	Nagasaki Line	Oe towards Tosu
Location
- Location within Nagasaki Prefecture Location within Japan

Hizen-Nagata Station (肥前長田駅, Hizennagata-eki) is a passenger railway station located in the city of Isahaya, Nagasaki Prefecture, Japan. It is operated by JR Kyushu.

== Lines ==
The station is served by the Nagasaki Main Line and is located 95.6 km from the starting point of the line at Tosu.

== Station layout ==
The station, which is unstaffed, consists of two side platforms serving two tracks. There is no station building. Near the entrance to station is a shelter which houses an automatic ticket vending machine. Shelters are also provided on the platforms for passengers. Access to the opposite side platform is by means of a footbridge.

=== Platforms ===
1	■ JH Nagasaki Main Line	for Saga and Tosu
2	■ JH Nagasaki Main Line	for Isahaya and Nagasaki

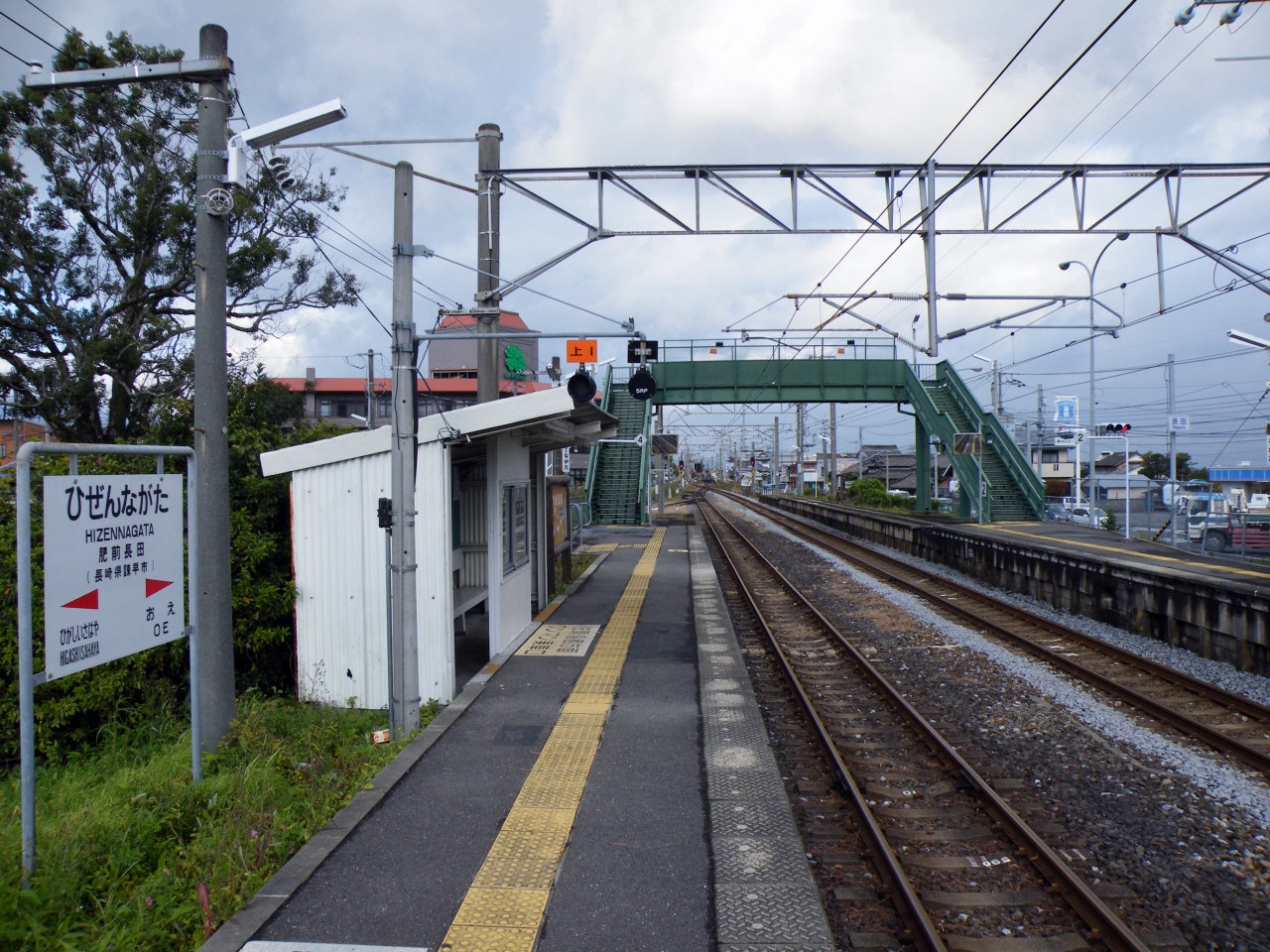
A view of the platforms and tracks.

== History ==
Japanese Government Railways (JGR) built the station in the 1930s during the development of an alternative route for the Nagasaki Main Line along the coast of the Ariake Sea. In a phase of construction of what was at first called the Ariake West Line, a track was built from Isahaya (on the existing Nagasaki Main Line) north to Yue which opened on 24 March 1934 as the terminus of the track. Hizen-Nagata was opened on the same day as an intermediate station on this stretch of track. A few months later, link up was made from Yue to Tara (which had been extended south from Hizen-Yamaguchi). With through traffic achieved from Hizen-Yamaguchi on the new route to Nagasaki, the entire stretch of track was designated as part of the Nagasaki Main Line on 1 December 1934. With the privatization of Japanese National Railways (JNR), the successor of JGR, on 1 April 1987, control of the station passed to JR Kyushu.

== Passenger statistics ==
In fiscal 2014, there were a total of 49,229 boarding passengers, given a daily average of 135 passengers.

== Surrounding area ==
- Nagasaki Ken'ei Bus, Higashi Nagata Bus Stop
- Nagata Post Office
- National Isahaya Youth Outdoor Learning Center (though this is the closest station, there is a direct bus from Isahaya Station)
- National Route 207
- Ōsato-Moriyama-Hizennagata Prefectural Route 124

== See also ==
- List of railway stations in Japan
