= Konagai Station =

Railway station in Isahaya, Nagasaki Prefecture, Japan

Konagai Station 小長井駅
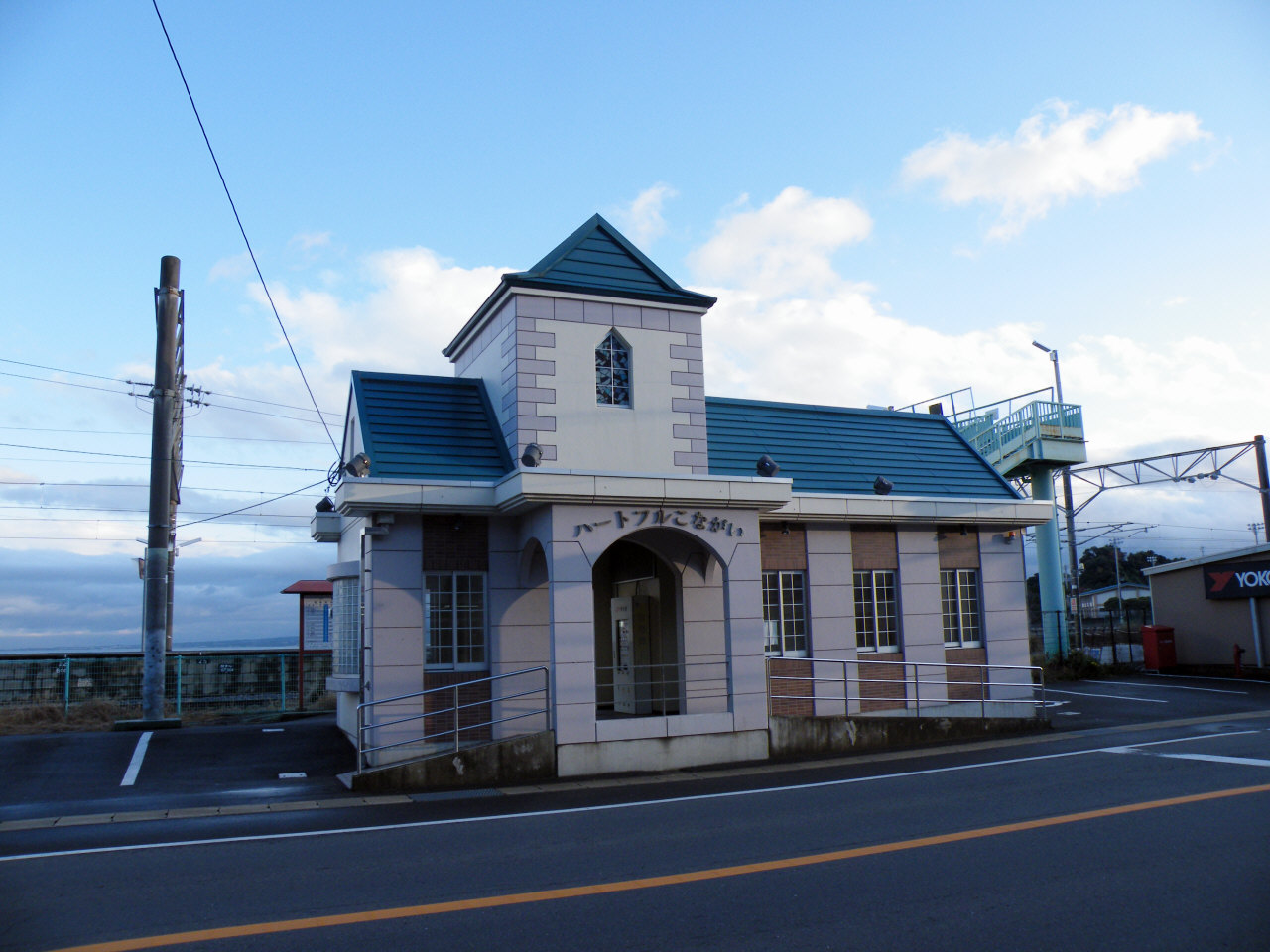
- Konagai Station in 2008

General information
- Location: Konagaicho Ogawaharaura, Isahaya-shi, Nagasaki-ken 859-0165; Japan
- Coordinates: 32°55′26.98″N 130°11′10.28″E
- Operator: JR Kyushu
- Line: JH Nagasaki Main Line
- Distance: 82.3 km from Tosu
- Platforms: 1 island platform
- Tracks: 2 + 1 siding

Construction
- Structure type: At grade
- Accessible: No - platform accessed by footbridge

Other information
- Status: Unstaffed
- Website: Official website

History
- Opened: 1 December 1934

Passengers
- FY2016: 116

Services
Preceding station	JR Kyushu	Following station
Nagasato towards Nagasaki	Nagasaki Line	Hizen-Ōura towards Tosu
Location
- Location within Nagasaki Prefecture Location within Japan

Konagai Station (小長井駅, Konagai-eki) is a passenger railway station located in the city of Isahaya, Nagasaki Prefecture, Japan. It is operated by JR Kyushu.

== Lines ==
The station is served by the Nagasaki Main Line and is located 82.3 km from the starting point of the line at Tosu.

== Station layout ==
The station consists of an island platform serving two tracks. The station building is a stonework structure built to resemble a European church complete with sloping roofs and tower with stained glass. It is, however, unstaffed, and houses only a waiting room and automatic ticket vending machine. Access to the island platform is by means of a footbridge. A siding branches off track 1 and includes some vehicle sheds.

=== Platforms ===
1	■ JH Nagasaki Main Line	for Saga and Tosu
2	■ JH Nagasaki Main Line	for Isahaya and Nagasaki

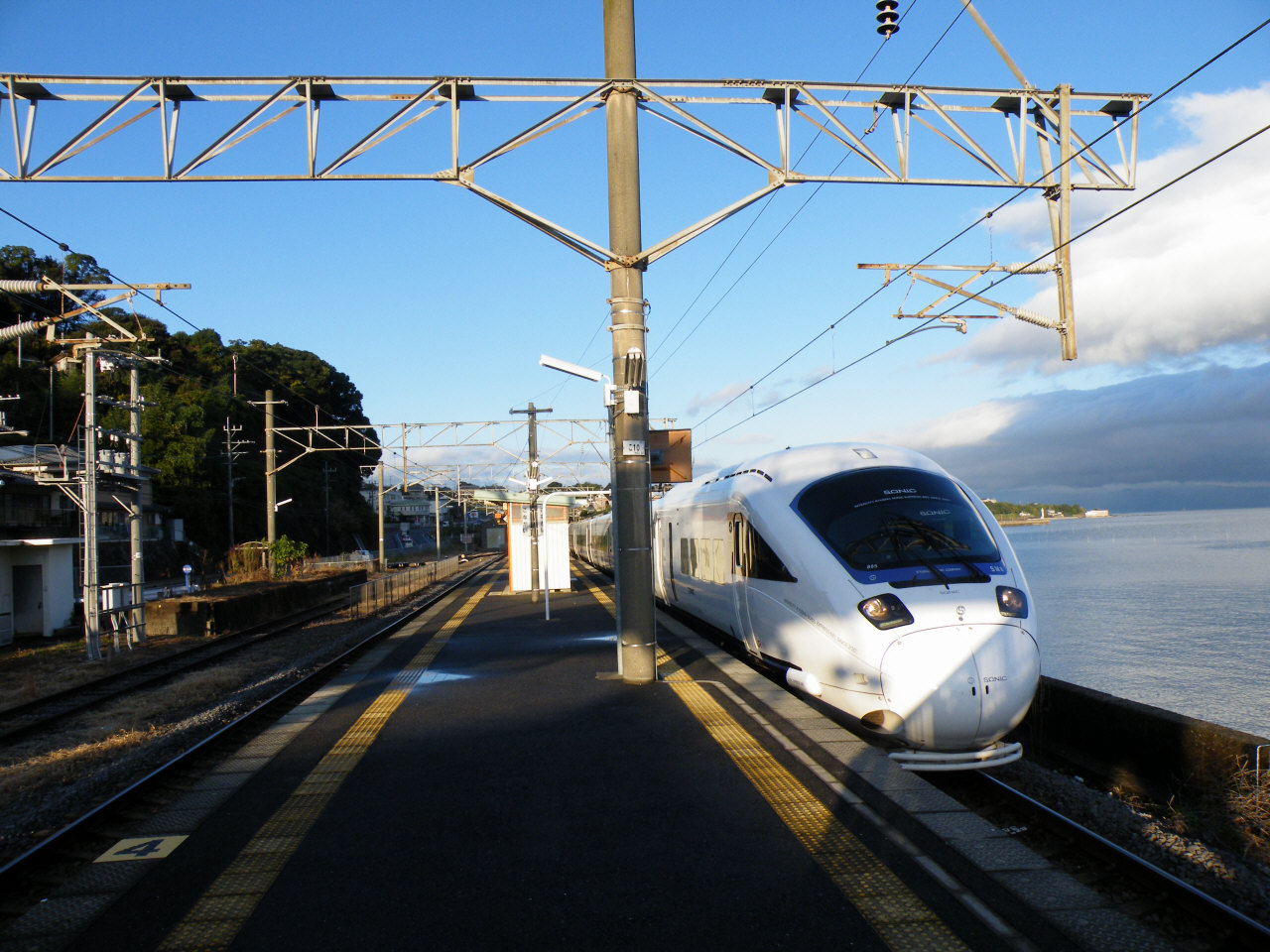
A view of the platform and tracks.

== History ==
Japanese Government Railways (JGR) built the station in the 1930s during the development of an alternative route for the Nagasaki Main Line along the coast of the Ariake Sea. By 1934, a track extended south from Hizen-Yamaguchi (then called the Ariake Line) had reached Tara and another track extended north from Isahaya (called the Ariake West Line) had reached Yue. In the final phase of construction, a track was laid to link up between Tara and Yue. Through-traffic was achieved on 1 December 1934. On the same day, Konagai was opened as an intermediate station on this new stretch of track. At the same time, the route from Hizen-Yamaguchi through the station to Nagasaki was designated as part of the Nagasaki Main Line. With the privatization of Japanese National Railways (JNR), the successor of JGR, on 1 April 1987, control of the station passed to JR Kyushu.

== Passenger statistics ==
In fiscal 2016, the daily average number of passengers using the station (boarding passengers only) was above 100 and below 323. The station did not rank among the top 300 busiest stations of JR Kyushu.

== Surrounding area ==
- National Route 207
- Isahaya City Hall Konagai Branch
- Isahaya City Konagai Junior High School
- Isahaya City Konagai Elementary School

== See also ==
- List of railway stations in Japan
