= Higashi-Isahaya Station =

Railway station in Isahaya, Nagasaki Prefecture, Japan

Higashi-Isahaya Station 東諫早駅
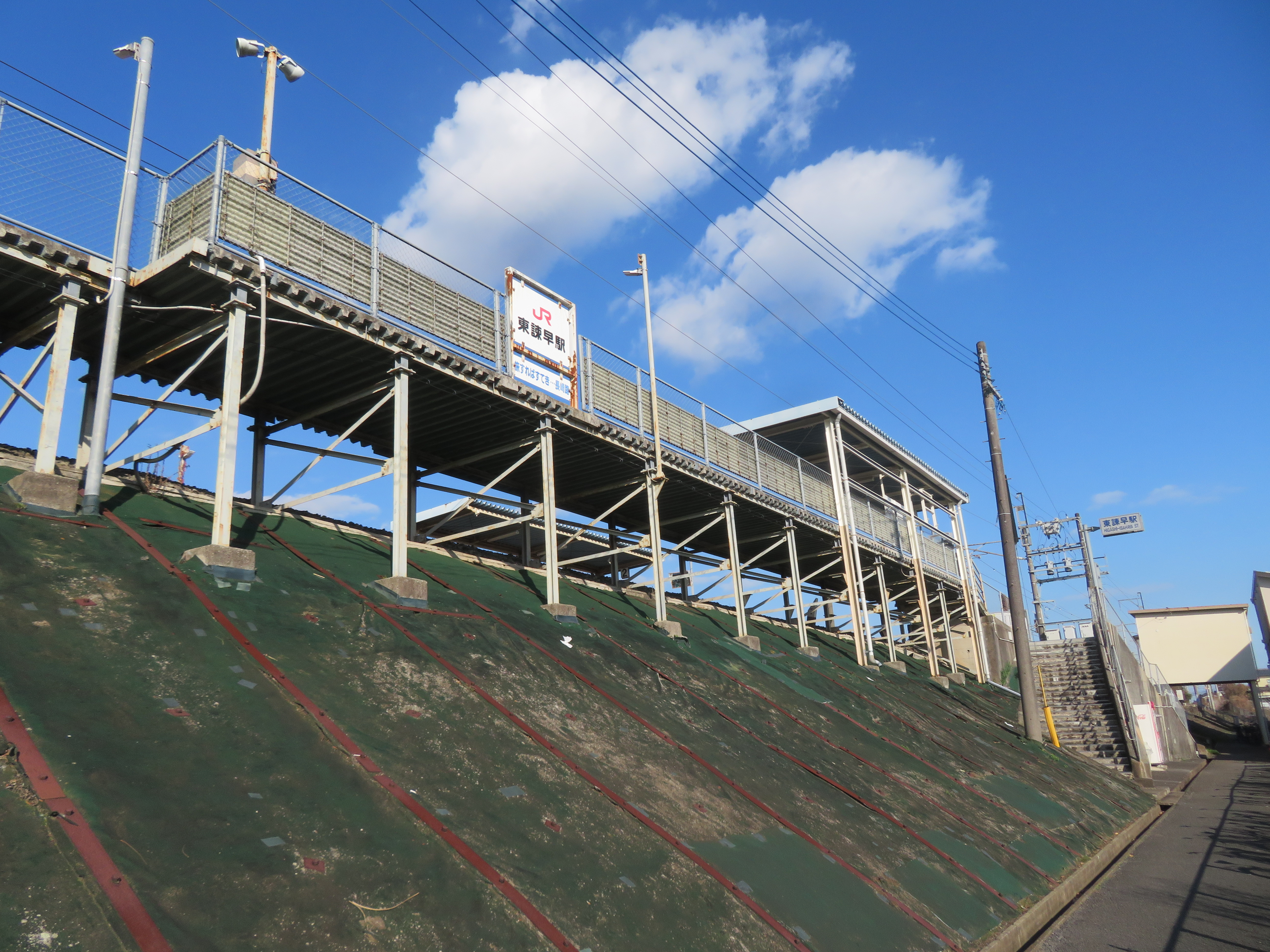
- Higashi-Isahaya Station in 2022

General information
- Location: Fukudamachi, Isahaya-shi, Nagasaki-ken 854-0001; Japan
- Coordinates: 32°51′11″N 130°03′42″E
- Operator: JR Kyushu
- Line: JH Nagasaki Main Line
- Distance: 97.8 km from Tosu
- Platforms: 2 side platforms
- Tracks: 2

Construction
- Structure type: Embankment
- Accessible: No - steps up embankment

Other information
- Status: Unstaffed
- Website: Official website

History
- Opened: 24 March 1934

Passengers
- FY2014: 112 daily

Services
Preceding station	JR Kyushu	Following station
Isahaya towards Nagasaki	Nagasaki Line	Hizen-Nagata towards Tosu
Location
- Location within Nagasaki Prefecture Location within Japan

Higashi-Isahaya Station (東諫早駅, Higashiisahaya-eki) is a passenger railway station located in the city of Isahaya, Nagasaki Prefecture, Japan. It is operated by JR Kyushu.

== Lines ==
The station is served by the Nagasaki Main Line and is located 97.8 km from the starting point of the line at Tosu.

== Station layout ==
The station, which is unstaffed, consists of two side platforms serving two tracks on an embankment. Track 1 is a through-track while track 2 is a passing loop. Only Platform 1 is in normal use. There is no station building but shelters are provided on both platforms for waiting passengers. From the station entrance, a double flight of steps leads up the embankment to platform 1. Access to the opposite side platform is by means of a level crossing.

=== Platforms ===
1	■ JH Nagasaki Main Line	for Saga and Tosu for Isahaya and Nagasaki
2	■ JH Nagasaki Main Line	<not in service>

== History ==
Japanese Government Railways (JGR) built the station in the 1930s during the development of an alternative route for the Nagasaki Main Line along the coast of the Ariake Sea. In a phase of construction of what was at first called the Ariake West Line, a track was built from Isahaya (on the existing Nagasaki Main Line) north to Yue which opened on 24 March 1934 as the terminus of the track. Higashi-Isahaya was opened on the same day as an intermediate station on this stretch of track. A few months later, link up was made from Yue to Tara (which had been extended south from Hizen-Yamaguchi). With through traffic achieved from Hizen-Yamaguchi on the new route to Nagasaki, the entire stretch of track was designated as part of the Nagasaki Main Line on 1 December 1934. With the privatization of Japanese National Railways (JNR), the successor of JGR, on 1 April 1987, control of the station passed to JR Kyushu.

== Passenger statistics ==
In fiscal 2014, there were a total of 41,099 boarding passengers, giving a daily average of 112 passengers.

== Surrounding area ==
- National Route 207

== See also ==
- List of railway stations in Japan
