= Ono Station =

Ono Station or Ōno Station can refer to a number of train stations in Japan.

- Ōno Station (Fukushima) - (大野駅) in Fukushima Prefecture
- Ono Station (Hyōgo) - (小野駅) in Hyogo Prefecture
- Ono Station (Kyoto) - (小野駅) in Kyoto Prefecture
- Ono Station (Nagano) - (小野駅) in Nagano Prefecture
- Ono Station (Nagasaki) - (小野駅) in Nagasaki Prefecture
- Ono Station (Shiga) - (小野駅) in Shiga Prefecture
- Rikuzen-Ono Station - (陸前小野駅) in Miyagi Prefecture
