= Nagasato =

Nagasato (written: 永里) is a Japanese surname. Notable people with the surname include:

- Asano Nagasato (永里 亜紗乃, born 1989), Japanese women's footballer
- Genki Nagasato (永里 源気, born 1985), Japanese footballer
- Yūki Nagasato (永里 優季, born 1987), Japanese women's footballer

== See also ==
- Nagasato Station, a railway station in Isahaya, Nagasaki Prefecture, Japan
