= Hizen-Ōura Station =

Railway station in Tara, Saga Prefecture, Japan

Hizen-Ōura Station 肥前大浦駅
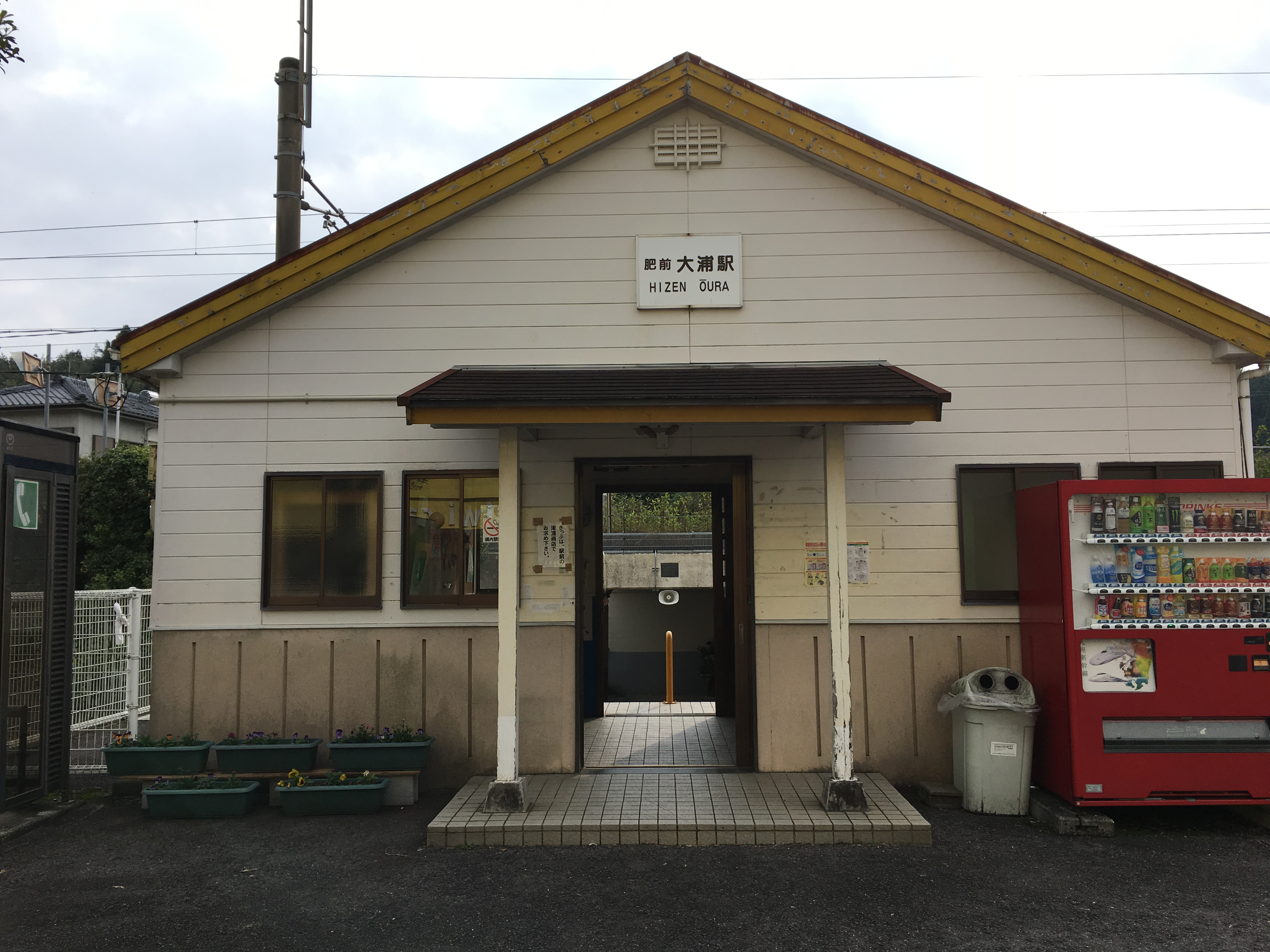
- Hizen-Ōura Station in 2017

General information
- Location: Hei Oura, Tara-cho, Fujitsu-gun, Saga-ken 849-1613; Japan
- Coordinates: 32°58′32″N 130°12′25″E
- Operator: JR Kyushu
- Line: JH Nagasaki Main Line
- Distance: 75.6 km from Tosu
- Platforms: 1 island platform
- Tracks: 2 + 1 siding

Construction
- Structure type: At grade
- Accessible: No - platform accessed by underpass with steps

Other information
- Status: Unstaffed
- Website: Official website

History
- Opened: 1 December 1934

Passengers
- FY2016: 145 daily

Services
Preceding station	JR Kyushu	Following station
Konagai towards Nagasaki	Nagasaki Line	Tara towards Tosu
Location
- Location within Saga Prefecture Location within Japan

Hizen-Ōura Station (肥前大浦駅, Hizen'ōura-eki) is a passenger railway station located in the town of Tara, Saga Prefecture, Japan. It is operated by JR Kyushu and is on the Nagasaki Main Line.

== Lines ==
The station is served by the Nagasaki Main Line and is located 75.6 km from the starting point of the line at Tosu.

== Station layout ==
The station consists of an island platform serving two tracks with a siding branching off track 1. The station building, an old timber structure, is unstaffed and serves only as a waiting room. Access to the island platform is by means of an underpass. Some types of tickets are available from a kan'i itaku agent outside the station.

=== Platforms ===
1	■ JH Nagasaki Main Line	for Saga and Tosu
2	■ JH Nagasaki Main Line	for Nagasaki

== History ==
Japanese Government Railways (JGR) built the station in the 1930s during the development of an alternative route for the Nagasaki Main Line along the coast of the Ariake Sea. By 1934, a track extended south from Hizen-Yamaguchi (then called the Ariake Line) had reached Tara and another track extended north from Isahaya (called the Ariake West Line) had reached Yue. In the final phase of construction, a track was laid to link up between Tara and Yue. Through-traffic was achieved on 1 December 1934. On the same day, Hizen-Ōura was opened as an intermediate station on this new stretch of track. At the same time, the route from Hizen-Yamaguchi through the station to Nagasaki was designated as part of the Nagasaki Main Line. With the privatization of Japanese National Railways (JNR), the successor of JGR, on 1 April 1987, control of the station passed to JR Kyushu.

== Passenger statistics ==
In fiscal 2016, the daily average number of passengers using the station (boarding passengers only) was above 100 and below 323. The station did not rank among the top 300 busiest stations of JR Kyushu.

== Environs ==
- Port of Ōura
- Japan National Route 207

== See also ==
- List of railway stations in Japan
