= Masters W85 200 metres world record progression =

This is the progression of world record improvements of the 200 metres W85 division of Masters athletics.

Key

Incomplete information Wind aided Pending

Hand	Autoc	Wind	Athlete	Nationality	Birthdate	Age	Location	Date
	40.20	0.3	Christa Bortignon	Canada	29 January 1937	85 years, 210 days	Surrey	27 August 2022
	41.58	-0.8	Emiko Saito	Japan	13 March 1931	86 years, 244 days	Kofu	12 November 2017
	45.65		Mitsu Morita	Japan	1923	85	Isahaya	20 July 2008
	45.80	1.5	Mitsu Morita	Japan	1923	85	Miyazaki	28 September 2008
	48.36	-0.8	Olga Kotelko	Canada	2 March 1919	85 years, 186 days	Penticton	4 September 2004
	49.83	-0.3	Nora Wedemo	Sweden	19 April 1913	86 years, 125 days	Norrtälje	22 August 1999
