= Ōe Station =

Ōe Station (大江駅) is the name of two train stations in Japan:

- Ōe Station (Aichi)
- Ōe Station (Kyoto)

== See also ==
- Oe Station
