= Moriyama Station (Nagasaki) =

Railway station in Isahaya, Nagasaki Prefecture, Japan

Moriyama Station 森山駅
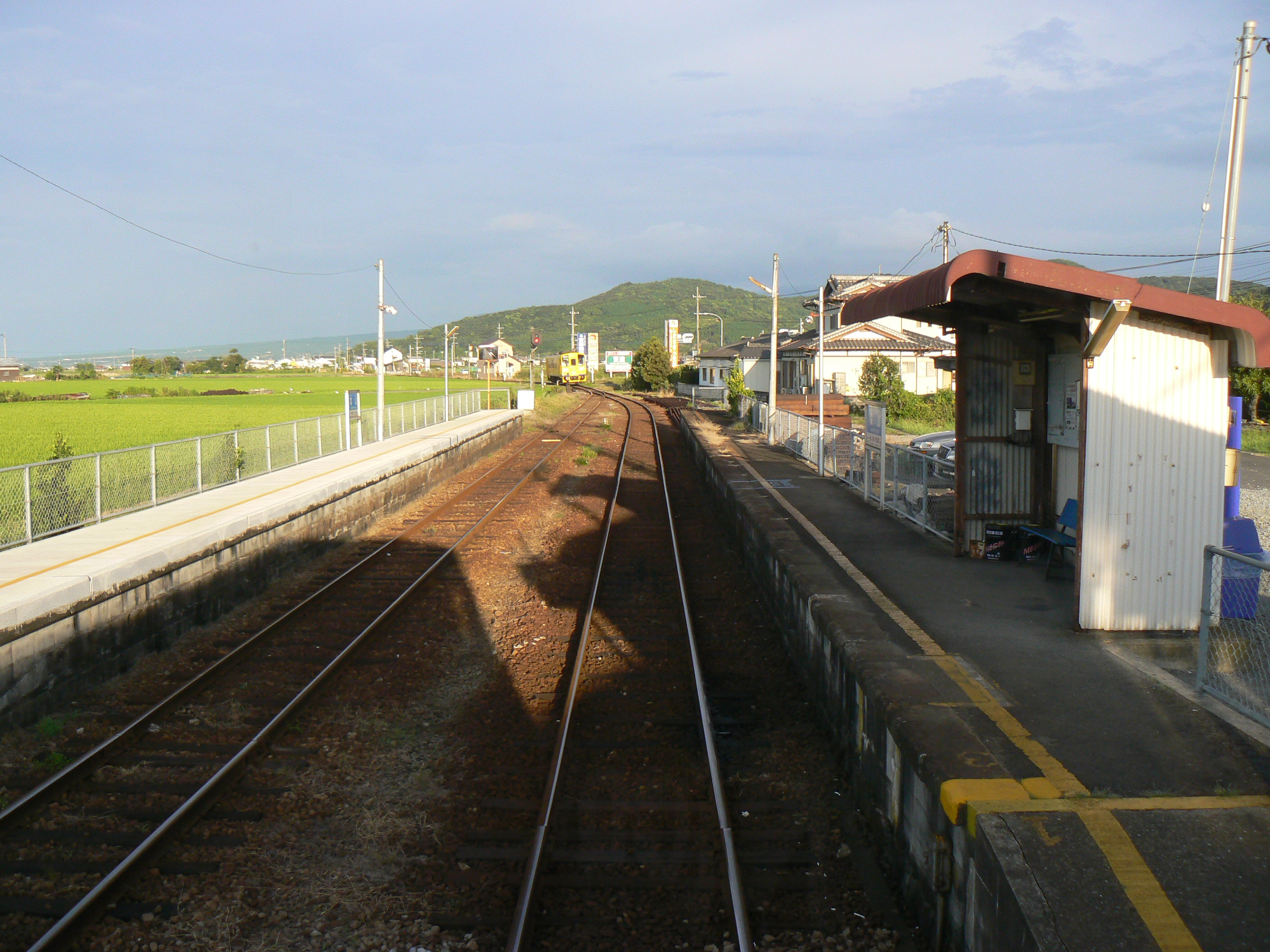

General information
- Location: Moriyamacho Shimoimuta, Isahaya-shi, Nagasaki-ken 854-0201; Japan
- Coordinates: 32°50′5.87″N 130°6′48.24″E
- Operator: Shimabara Railway
- Line: ■ Shimabara Railway Line
- Distance: 7.5 km from Isahaya
- Platforms: 2 side platforms

Other information
- Status: Unstaffed
- Website: Official website

History
- Opened: 20 June 1911

Passengers
- FY2018: 62 daily

Services
| Preceding station | Shimabara Railway | Following station |
|---|---|---|
| Kantakunosato towards Isahaya | Shimabara Railway Line | Kamanohana towards Shimabarakō |
Location
- Location within Nagasaki Prefecture Location within Japan

Moriyama Station (森山駅, Moriyama-eki) is a passenger railway station in located in the city of Isahaya, Nagasaki. It is operated by third-sector railway company Shimabara Railway.

== Lines ==
The station is served by the Shimabara Railway Line and is located 7.5 km from the starting point of the line at Isahaya.

== Station layout ==
The station consists of two unnumbered side platforms connected by a level crossing. There is no station building, but there is a waiting room the platform for trains in the direction of Isahaya. The station is unattended..

=== Platforms ===
| South side | ■ ■ Shimabara Railway Line | for Isahaya |
| North side | ■ ■Shimabara Railway Line | for Shimabara and Shimabarakō |

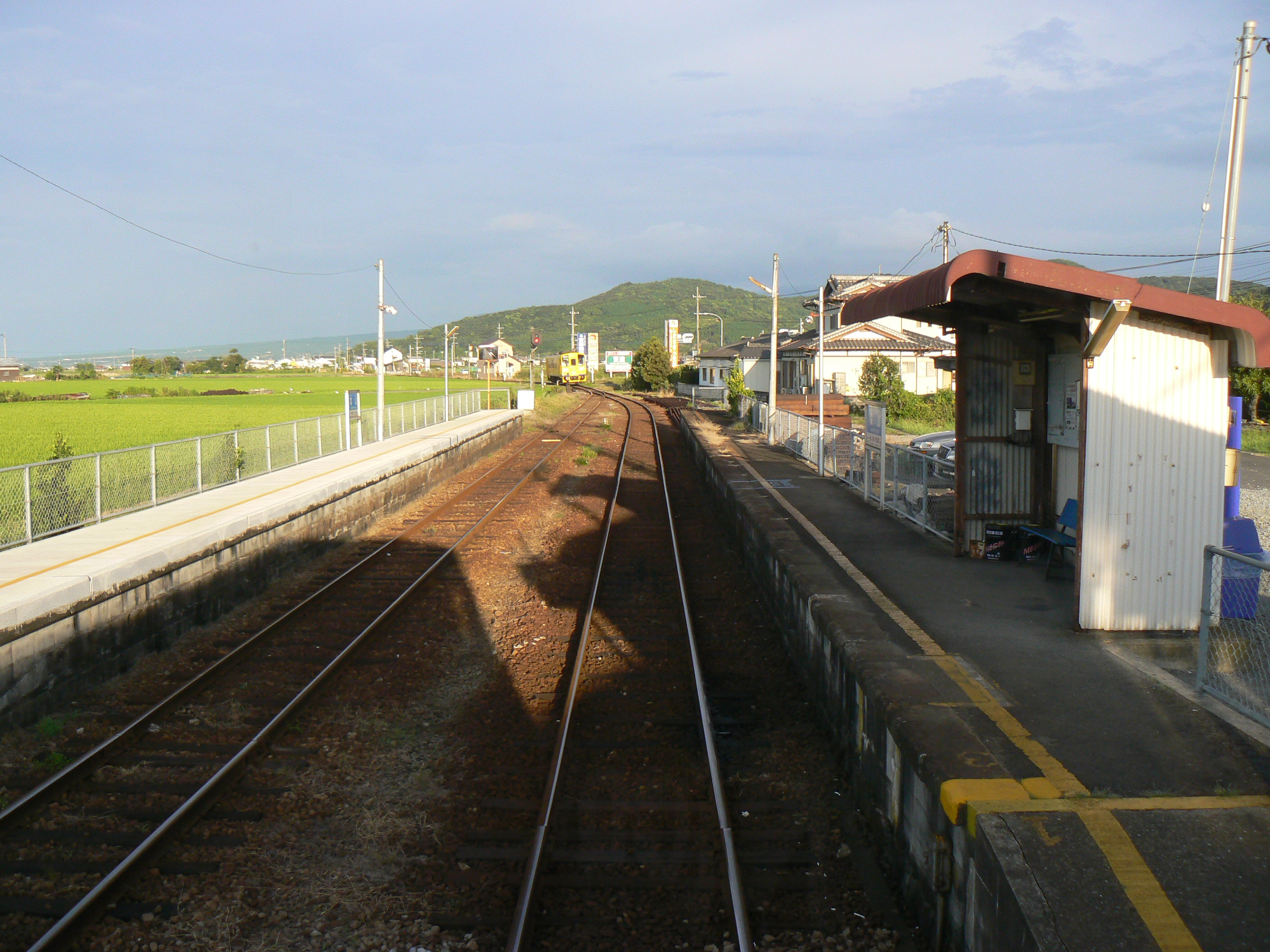
Platform

== History ==
Moriyama Station was opened on 20 June 1911.

== Passenger statistics ==
In fiscal 2018, there were a total of 22,542 boarding passengers, given a daily average of 62 passengers.

== Surrounding area ==
- Moriyama Fureai Park (Moriyama Rugby Park)

== See also ==
- List of railway stations in Japan
