= Oe Station =

Railway station in Isahaya, Nagasaki Prefecture, Japan

Oe Station 小江駅
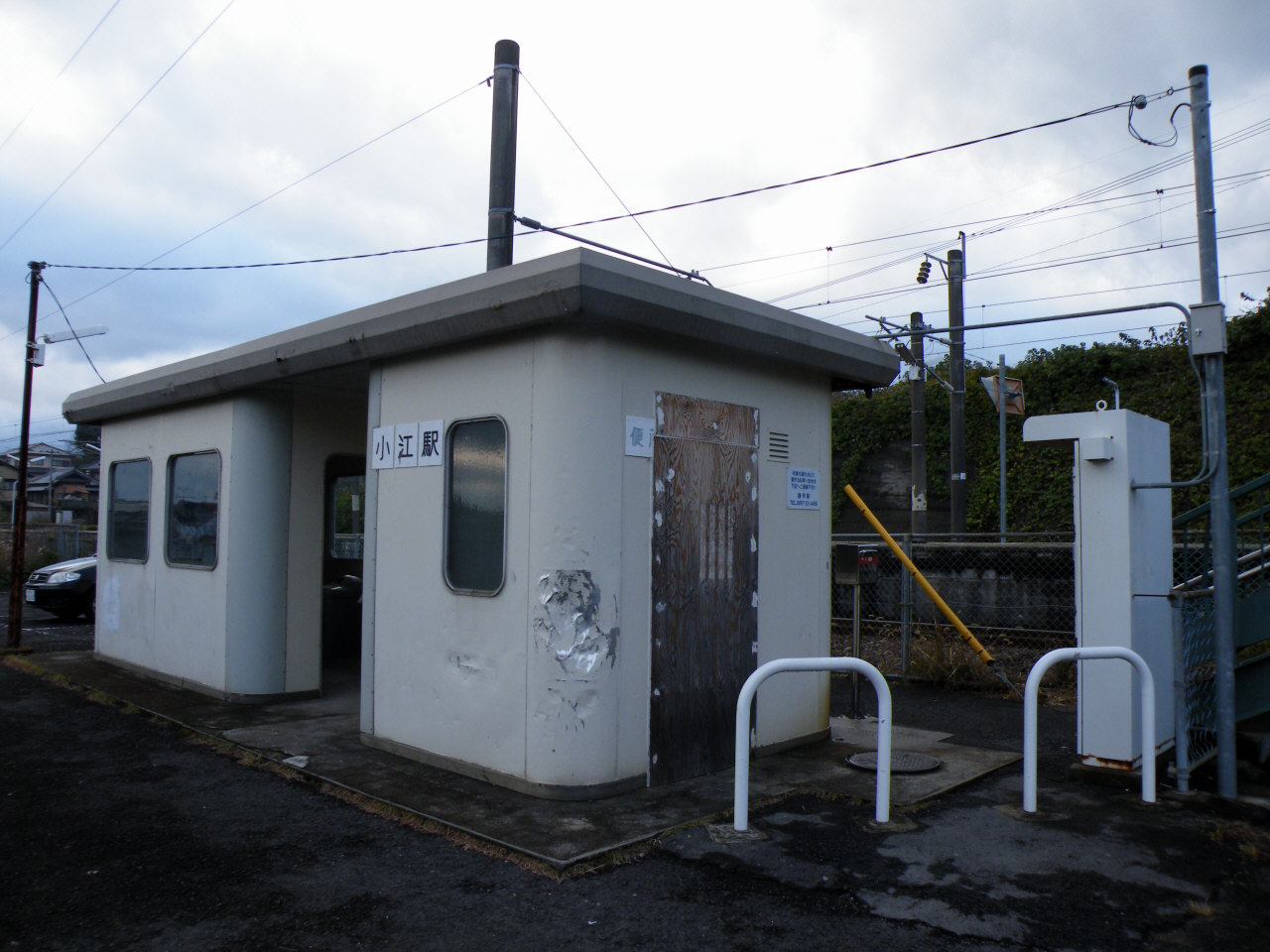
- Oe Station in 2008

General information
- Location: Takakicho Shitagumi, Isahaya-shi, Nagasaki-ken 859-0113; Japan
- Coordinates: 32°53′29″N 130°06′44″E
- Operator: JR Kyushu
- Line: JH Nagasaki Main Line
- Distance: 90.9 km from Tosu
- Platforms: 1 island platform
- Tracks: 2

Construction
- Structure type: At grade
- Cycle facilities: Bike shed
- Accessible: No - access to platform by footbridge

Other information
- Status: Unstaffed
- Website: Official website

History
- Opened: 24 March 1934

Passengers
- FY2014: 145 daily

Services
| Preceding station | JR Kyushu | Following station |
|---|---|---|
| Hizen-Nagata towards Nagasaki | Nagasaki Line | Yue towards Tosu |
Location
- Location within Nagasaki Prefecture Location within Japan

Oe Station (小江駅, Oe-eki) is a passenger railway station located in the city of Isahaya, Nagasaki Prefecture, Japan. It is operated by JR Kyushu.

Oe Station has one of the shortest station names in Japan. The others are Ei Station in Kagoshima Prefecture, Ao Station in Hyōgo Prefecture and Ii Station in Yamaguchi Prefecture. Tsu Station of Mie Prefecture has a shorter name in Japanese (it is the only station name written with one kana), but this is not so when romanized.

== Lines ==
The station is served by the Nagasaki Main Line and is located 90.9 km from the starting point of the line at Tosu.

== Station layout ==
The station consists of an island platform serving two tracks. The station building is a metal cabin and is unstaffed, serving only as a waiting room with an automatic ticket vending machine. Access to the island platform is by means of a footbridge.

=== Platforms ===
| 1 | ■ JH Nagasaki Main Line | for Saga and Tosu |
| 2 | ■ JH Nagasaki Main Line | for Isahaya and Nagasaki |

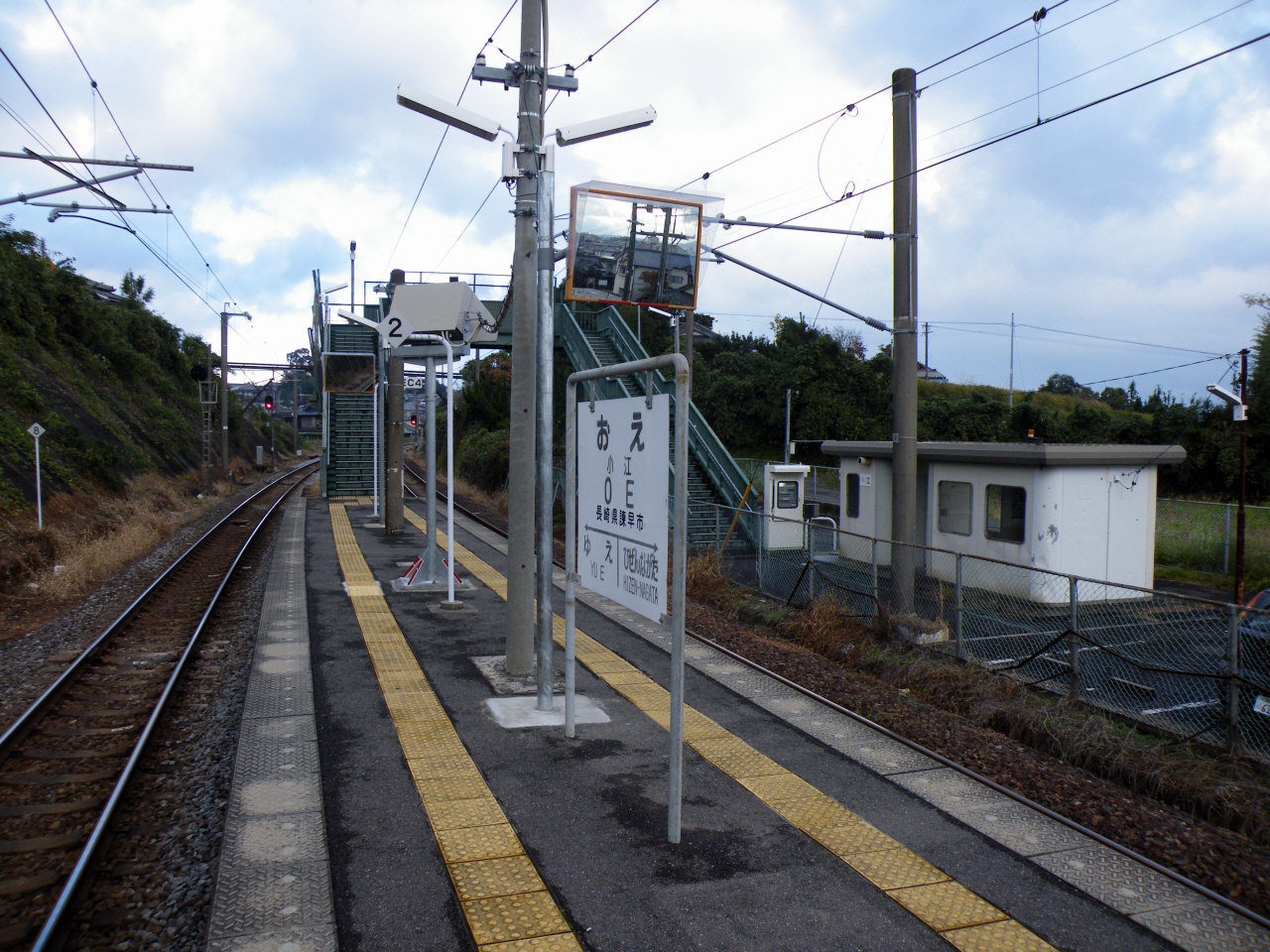
A view of the platform and tracks.

== History ==
Japanese Government Railways (JGR) built the station in the 1930s during the development of an alternative route for the Nagasaki Main Line along the coast of the Ariake Sea. In a phase of construction of what was at first called the Ariake West Line, a track was built from Isahaya (on the existing Nagasaki Main Line) north to Yue which opened on 24 March 1934 as the terminus of the track. Oe was opened on the same day as an intermediate station on this stretch of track. A few months later, link up was made from Yue to Tara (which had been extended south from Hizen-Yamaguchi). With through traffic achieved from Hizen-Yamaguchi on the new route to Nagasaki, the entire stretch of track was designated as part of the Nagasaki Main Line on 1 December 1934. With the privatization of Japanese National Railways (JNR), the successor of JGR, on 1 April 1987, control of the station passed to JR Kyushu.

== Passenger statistics ==
In fiscal 2014, there were a total of 52,823 boarding passengers, given a daily average of 145 passengers.

== Surrounding area ==
To the south of the station is the Ariake Sea. Route 207 runs along the coast. Other locations nearby include:

- Takaki Nishi Elementary School
- Isahaya Senior High School, Takaki Branch
- Shinkai Post Office

== See also ==
- List of railway stations in Japan
