= Tara, Saga =

Tara 太良町
- Town
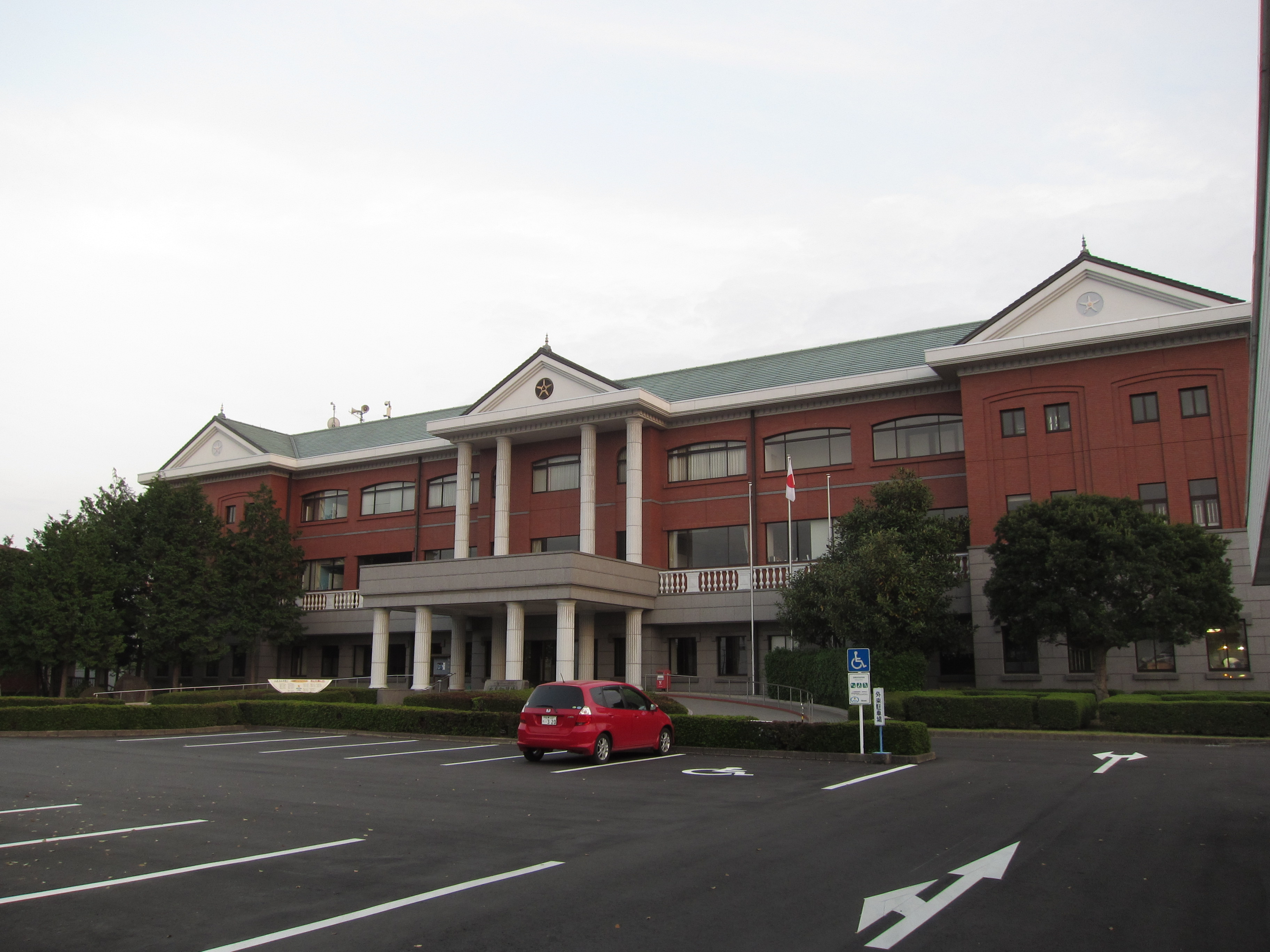
- Tara Town Hall

- Flag Seal
- Location of Tara in Saga Prefecture

- Location in Japan
- Coordinates: 33°1′10″N 130°10′45″E
- Country: Japan
- Region: Kyushu
- Prefecture: Saga
- District: Fujitsu

Government
  - Mayor: Masaaki Iwashima

Area
  - Total: 74.30 km^{2} (28.69 sq mi)

Population (May 31, 2024)
  - Total: 7,973
  - Density: 107.3/km^{2} (277.9/sq mi)
- Time zone: UTC+09:00 (JST)
- City hall address: 1-6 Ōaza Tara, Tara-chō, Fujitsu-gun, Saga-ken 849-1698
- Website: Official website
- Symbols
- Bird: Uguisu (Japanese bush warbler)
- Flower: Mikan flower
- Tree: Hinoki

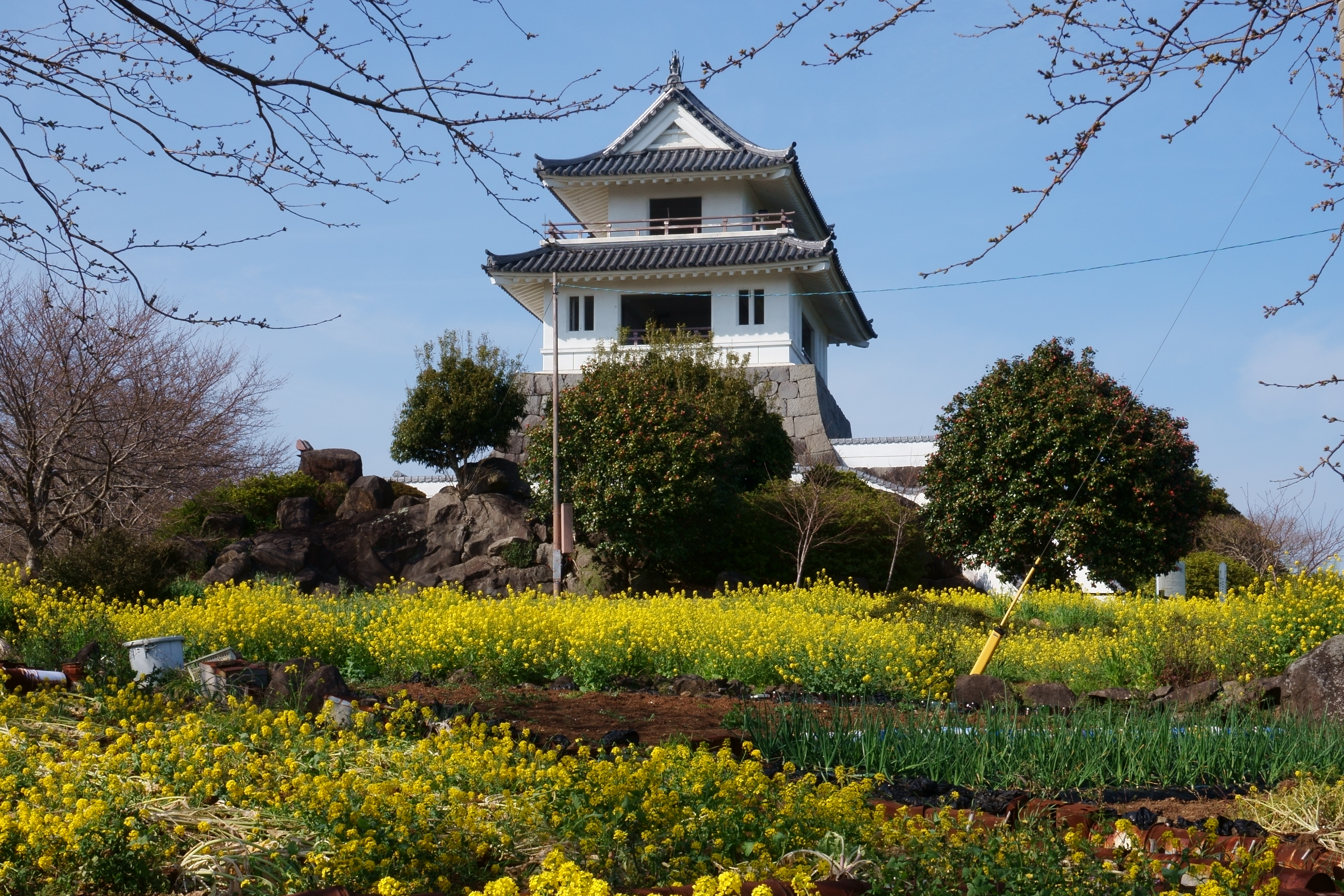
Castle-like observation deck of Takezaki

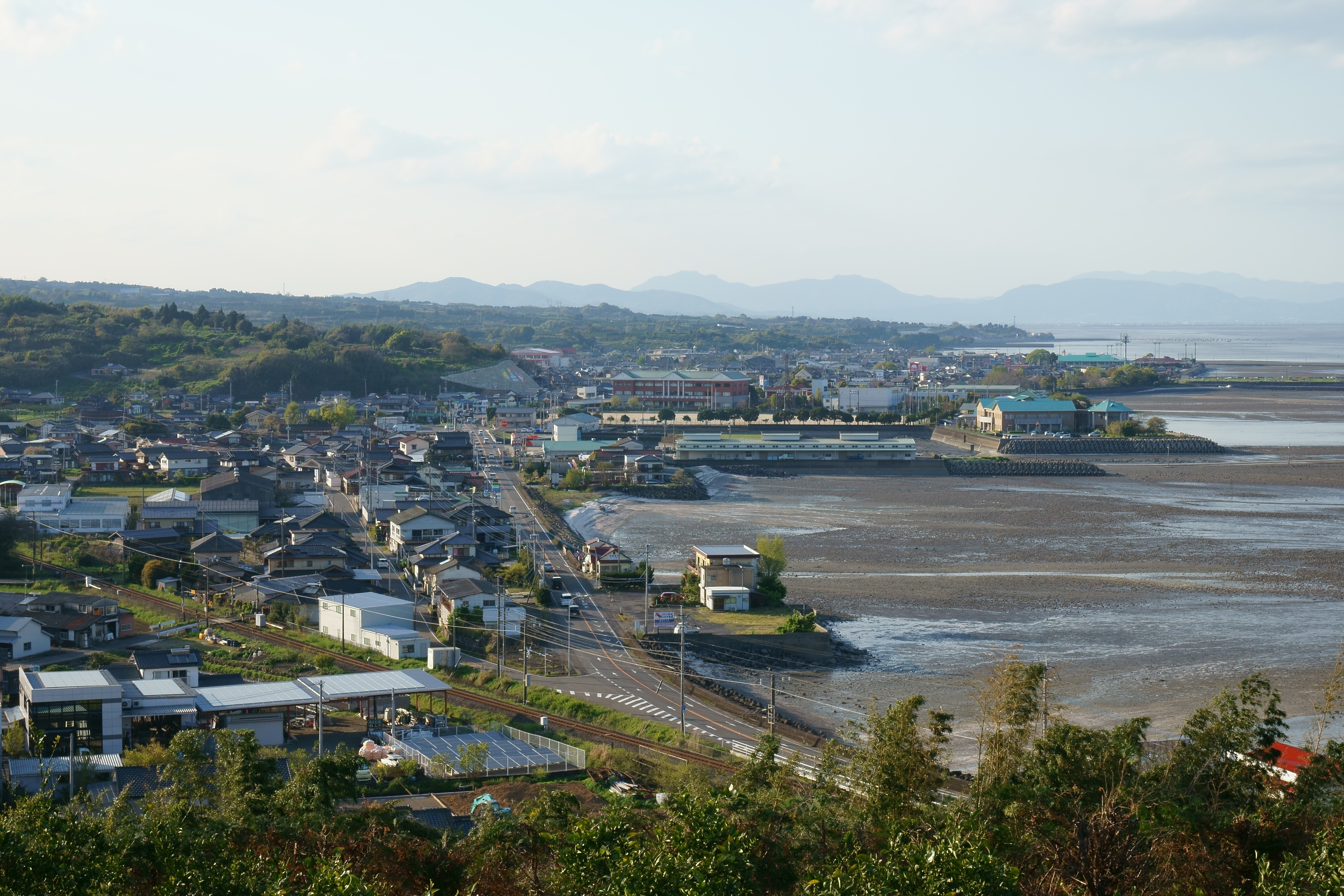
Tara town center from west of Kamezaki

Tara (太良町, Tara-chō) is a town and peninsula located in Fujitsu District, Saga Prefecture, Japan. As of 31 March 2024, the town had an estimated population of 7973 in 3215 households, and a population density of 750 persons per km². The total area of the town is 74.30 km^{2} (28.69 sq mi)

== Geography ==
Tara is located at the southern tip of Saga Prefecture; it borders Nagasaki Prefecture to the west and south, and faces the Ariake Sea to the east. Tara is composed of two traditional sections, which were once independent towns: Tara (多良) and Ōura (大浦). Tara is located near the Kashima Gatalympics, which takes place near Hizen-Iida Station.

=== Adjoining municipalities ===
Nagasaki Prefecture

- Isahaya
- Ōmura

Saga Prefecture

- Kashima

=== Climate ===
Tara has a humid subtropical climate (Köppen Cfa) characterized by warm summers and cool winters with light to no snowfall. The average annual temperature in Tara is 15.8 °C. The average annual rainfall is 2254 mm with September as the wettest month. The temperatures are highest on average in August, at around 26.2 °C, and lowest in January, at around 5.7 °C.

=== Demographics ===
Per Japanese census data, the population of Tara is as shown below.

Historical population
Year	Pop.	±%
1950	15,926	—
1960	15,574	−2.2%
1970	13,668	−12.2%
1980	12,911	−5.5%
1990	12,212	−5.4%
2000	11,140	−8.8%
2010	9,842	−11.7%
2020	8,121	−17.5%

== History ==
The area of Tara is part of ancient Hizen Province. In the Sengoku period, due to influence from Nagasaki, Christianity existed in the area, but after the results of the Shimabara Rebellion, most of the Christians were killed or went underground and became Kakure Kirishitans. There are grave stones that are scattered throughout Tara. During the Edo period, the area was part of the holdings of Saga Domain. Following the Meiji restoration, the villages of Tara, Ōura, and Nanaura was established on May 1, 1889 with the creation of the modern municipalities system. Tara merged with Ōura and attained town status on February 11, 1955. Later in March 1 of the same year, a section of Nanaura was absorbed into Tara.

== Government ==
Tara has a mayor-council form of government with a directly elected mayor and a unicameral town council of 11 members. Tara, together with the city of Kashima contributes two members to the Saga Prefectural Assembly. In terms of national politics, the town is part of the Saga 2nd district of the lower house of the Diet of Japan.

== Economy ==
The economy is overwhelming centered on agriculture, forestry and commercial fishing. In agriculture, mandarin orange production and livestock farming are thriving. In areas near the Ariake Sea, seaweed farming is the main industry. Marine products are also caught in abundance, and blue crabs and oysters are local specialties.

== Education ==
Tara has two public elementary schools and two public junior high schools operated by the town government, and one public high school operated by the Saga Prefectural Board of Education.

== Transportation ==
=== Railways ===
JR Kyushu - Nagasaki Main Line

JH Tara - Hizen-Ōura

=== Highways ===
- National Route 207
