= Saiwai Station =

Railway station in Isahaya, Nagasaki Prefecture, Japan

Saiwai Station 幸駅
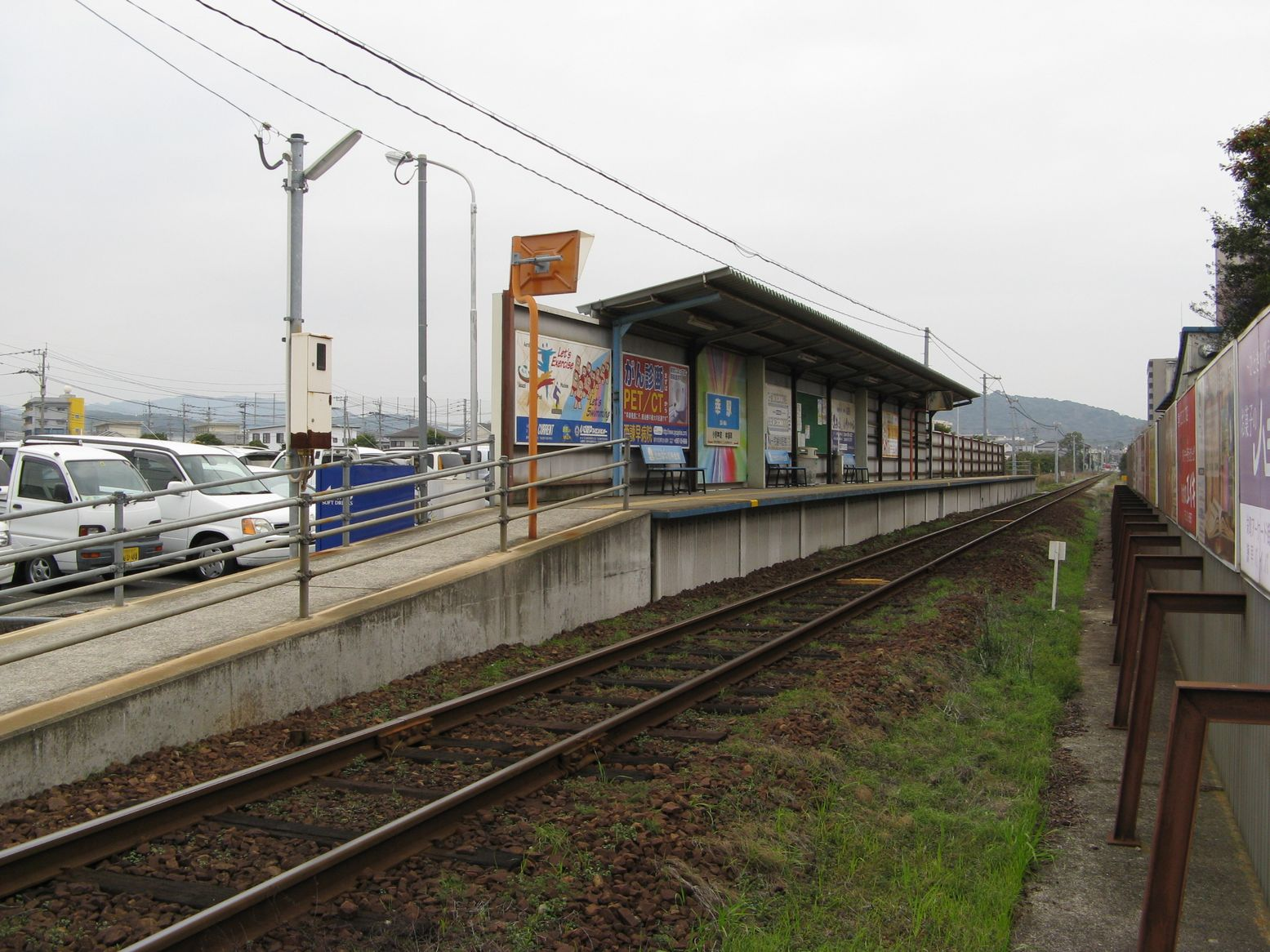
- Saiwai Station in January 2008

General information
- Location: 821-2 Sawai, Isahaya-shi, Nagasaki-ken 854-0041; Japan
- Coordinates: 32°50′13.45″N 130°4′0.4″E
- Operator: Shimabara Railway
- Line: ■ Shimabara Railway Line
- Distance: 2.9 km from Isahaya
- Platforms: 1 side platform

Other information
- Status: Unstaffed
- Website: Official website

History
- Opened: 11 March 2000

Passengers
- FY2018: 168 daily

Services
Preceding station	Shimabara Railway	Following station
Hon-Isahaya towards Isahaya	Shimabara Railway Line	Ono towards Shimabarakō
Location
- Location within Nagasaki Prefecture Location within Japan

Saiwai Station (幸駅, Saiwai-eki) is a passenger railway station in located in the city of Isahaya, Nagasaki. It is operated by third-sector railway company Shimabara Railway.

== Lines ==
The station is served by the Shimabara Railway Line and is located 2.9 km from the starting point of the line at Isahaya.

== Station layout ==
The station consists of one side platform located on the south side of a single track. There is no station building, but there is a roof over the platform. Part of the space under the platform is also used as a bicycle parking area. The station is unattended.

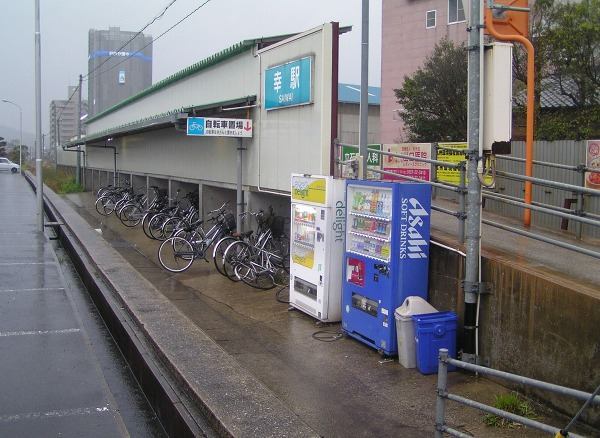
Outside the station showing bicycle parking area

== History ==
Sawai Station was opened on 11 March 2000.

== Passenger statistics ==
In fiscal 2018, there were a total of 61,458 boarding passengers, given a daily average of 168 passengers.

== Surrounding area ==
It is located in a redeveloped area east of the Isahaya city area.

- Kyushu Environmental Welfare and Medical College
- Isahaya City Isahaya Junior High School
- Isahaya City Oguri Elementary School
- Nagasaki Prefectural Isahaya Agricultural High School

== See also ==
- List of railway stations in Japan
