= Kamanohana Station =

Railway station in Isahaya, Nagasaki Prefecture, Japan

Kamanohana Station 釜ノ鼻駅
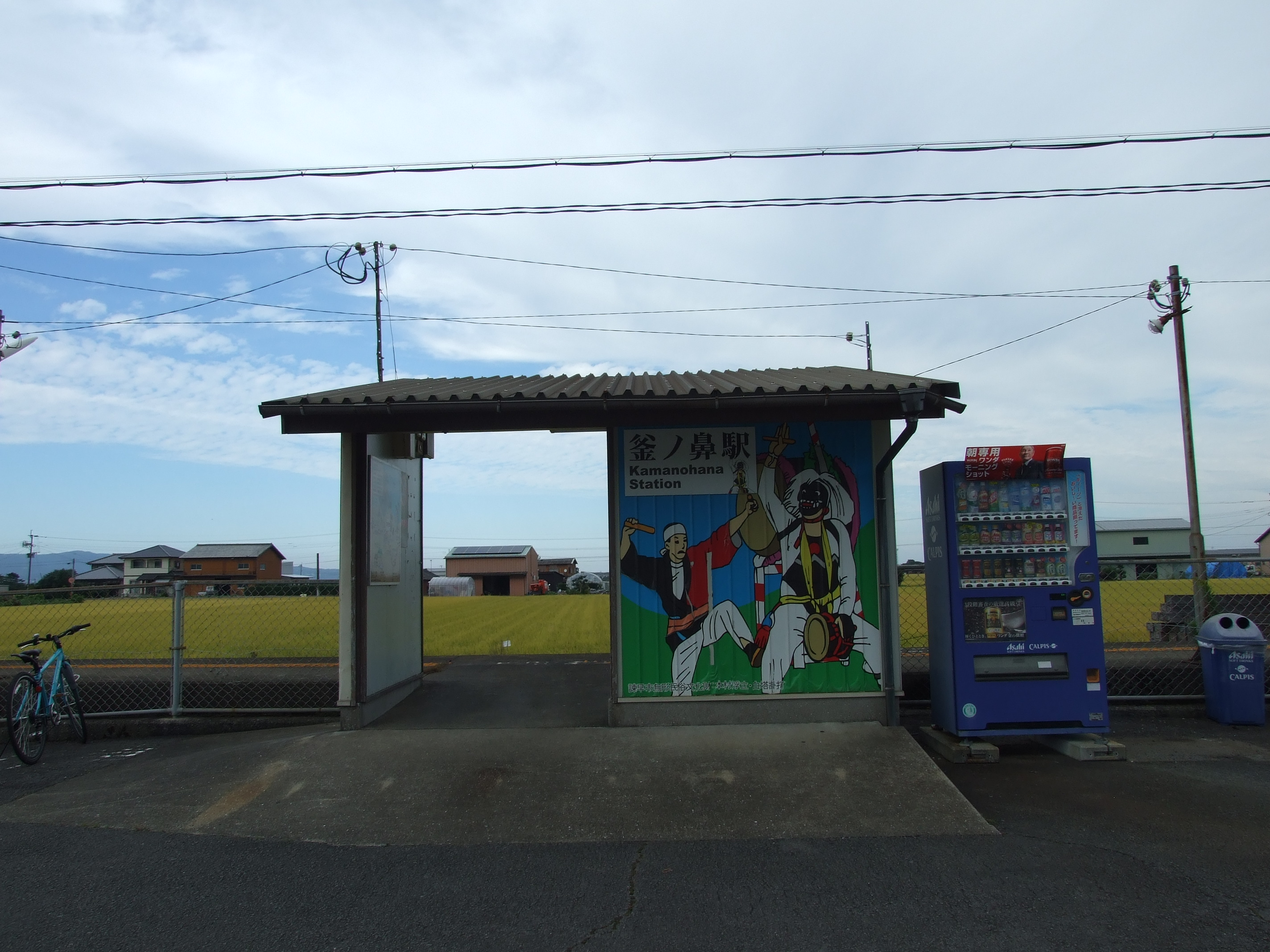

General information
- Location: Moriyamacho Tajiri, Isahaya-shiNagasaki-ken 854-0204; Japan
- Coordinates: 32°50′2.35″N 130°8′8.22″E
- Operator: Shimabara Railway
- Line: ■ Shimabara Railway Line
- Distance: 9.6 km from Isahaya
- Platforms: 1 side platform

Other information
- Status: Unstaffed
- Website: Official website

History
- Opened: 7 September 1935

Passengers
- FY2018: 18 daily

Services
Preceding station	Shimabara Railway	Following station
Moriyama towards Isahaya	Shimabara Railway Line	Isahaya-higashi-kōkōmae towards Shimabarakō
Location
- Location within Nagasaki Prefecture Location within Japan

Kamanohana Station (釜ノ鼻駅, Kamanohana-eki) is a passenger railway station in located in the city of Isahaya, Nagasaki. It is operated by third-sector railway company Shimabara Railway.

== Lines ==
The station is served by the Shimabara Railway Line and is located 9.6 km from the starting point of the line at Isahaya.

== Station layout ==
The station consists of one side platform located on the south side of a single track. A waiting room is located in the middle of the platform, adjacent to the south side, and the station entrance and exit are located in this waiting room. There is an uncovered bicycle parking area in front of the station.The station is unattended..

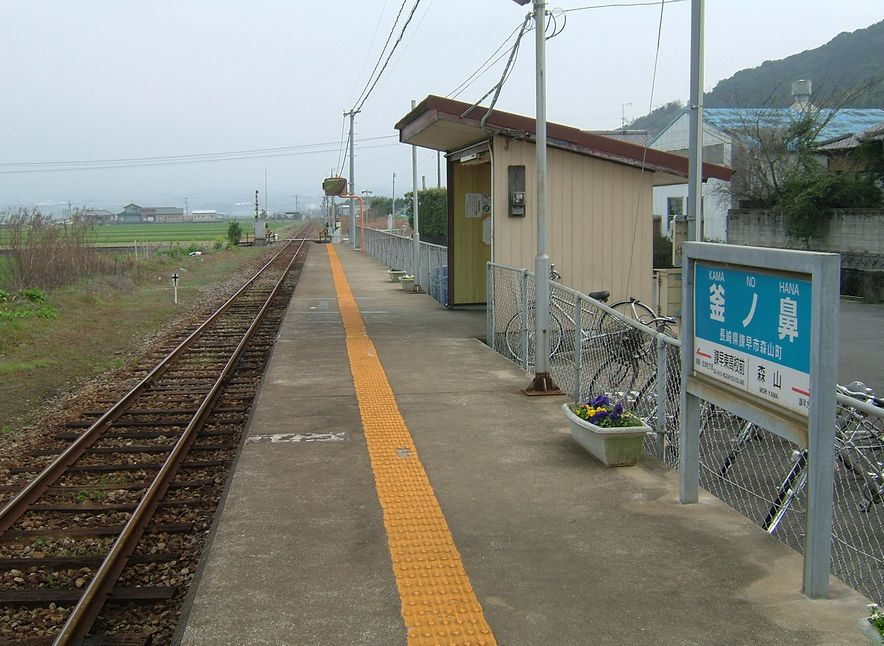
Platform

== History ==
Kamanohana Station was opened on 1 September 1935.

== Passenger statistics ==
In fiscal 2018, there were a total of 6,455 boarding passengers, given a daily average of 18 passengers.

== Surrounding area ==
- Isahaya City Hall Moriyama Branch (former Moriyama Town Hall)

== See also ==
- List of railway stations in Japan
