= Hon-Isahaya Station =

Railway station in Isahaya, Nagasaki Prefecture, Japan

Hon-Isahaya Station 本諫早駅
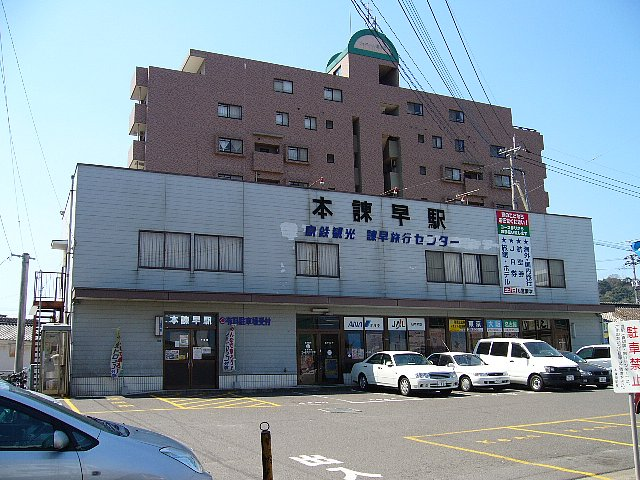
- Hon-Isahaya Station

General information
- Location: 4 Higashikōjimachi, Isahaya-shi, Nagasaki-ken 854-0014; Japan
- Coordinates: 32°50′30.13″N 130°3′11.20″E
- Operator: Shimabara Railway
- Line: ■ Shimabara Railway Line
- Distance: 1.5 km from Isahaya
- Platforms: 2 side platforms

Other information
- Status: Unstaffed
- Website: Official website

History
- Opened: 20 June 1911

Passengers
- FY2018: 584 daily

Services
Preceding station	Shimabara Railway	Following station
Isahaya Terminus	Shimabara Railway Line	Saiwai towards Shimabarakō
Location
- Location within Nagasaki Prefecture Location within Japan

Hon-Isahaya Station (本諫早駅, Hon-Isahaya-eki) is a passenger railway station in located in the city of Isahaya, Nagasaki. It is operated by third-sector railway company Shimabara Railway.

== Lines ==
The station is served by the Shimabara Railway Line and is located 1.5 km from the starting point of the line at Isahaya.

== Station layout ==
The station is on the ground level with two opposing side platforms for two tracks, plus two sidings on the Isahaya side. The platforms are connected by a level crossing within the premises. When trains are not switching, both up and down trains stop at the platform on the station building side. As Isahaya Station only has one platform and one track, the siding is used for storing vehicles. There is a two-story station building on the north side of the platform. It The station is staffed. There is an automatic ticket machine in the waiting room inside the station building.

=== Platforms ===
1	■ ■ Shimabara Railway Line	for Shimabara and Shimabarakō
2	■ ■Shimabara Railway Line	for Isahaya

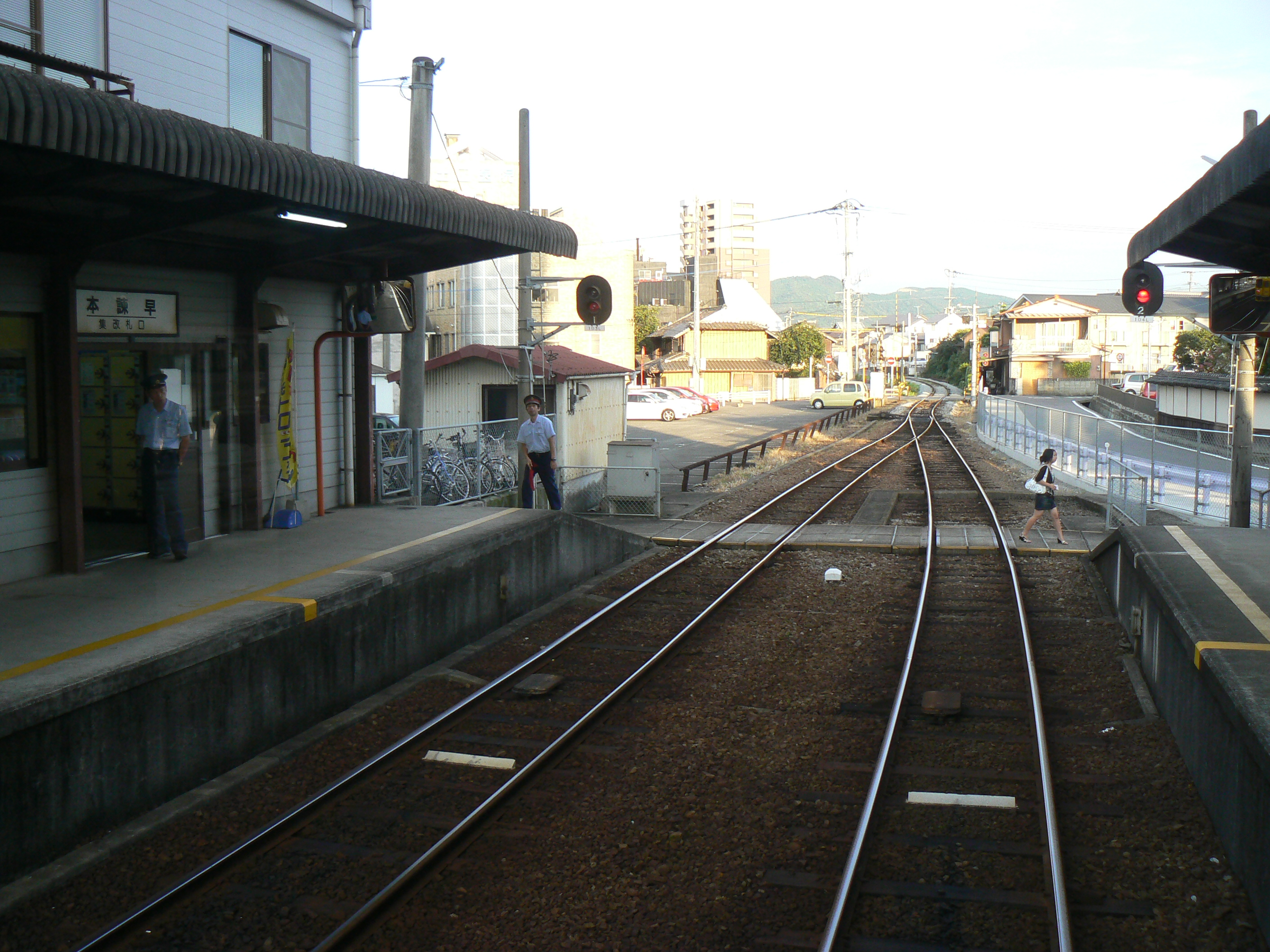
Platforms looking towards Saiwai

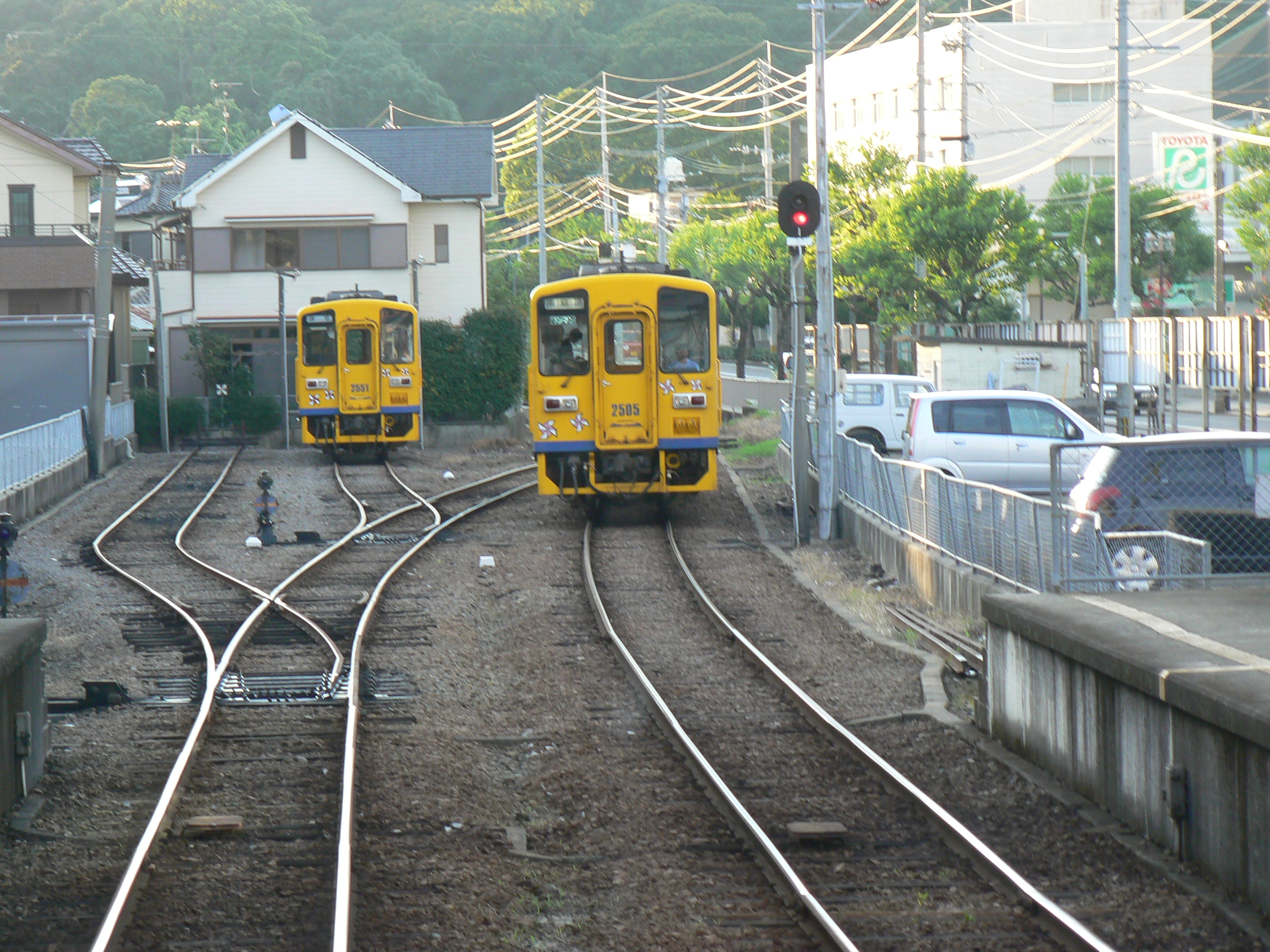
Siding

== History ==
The station was opened on 20 June 1911. In December 1989 the existing station building was completed.

== Passenger statistics ==
In fiscal 2018, there were a total of 213,436 boarding passengers, given a daily average of 584 passengers.

== Surrounding area ==
The Station is in the central area of Isahaya City.

- Isahaya City Office
- Isahaya Post Office
- Isahaya High School
- Isahaya Legal Affairs Bureau
- Isahaya City Library
- Isahaya Park

== See also ==
- List of railway stations in Japan
