= Isahaya =

Isahaya 諫早市
- City
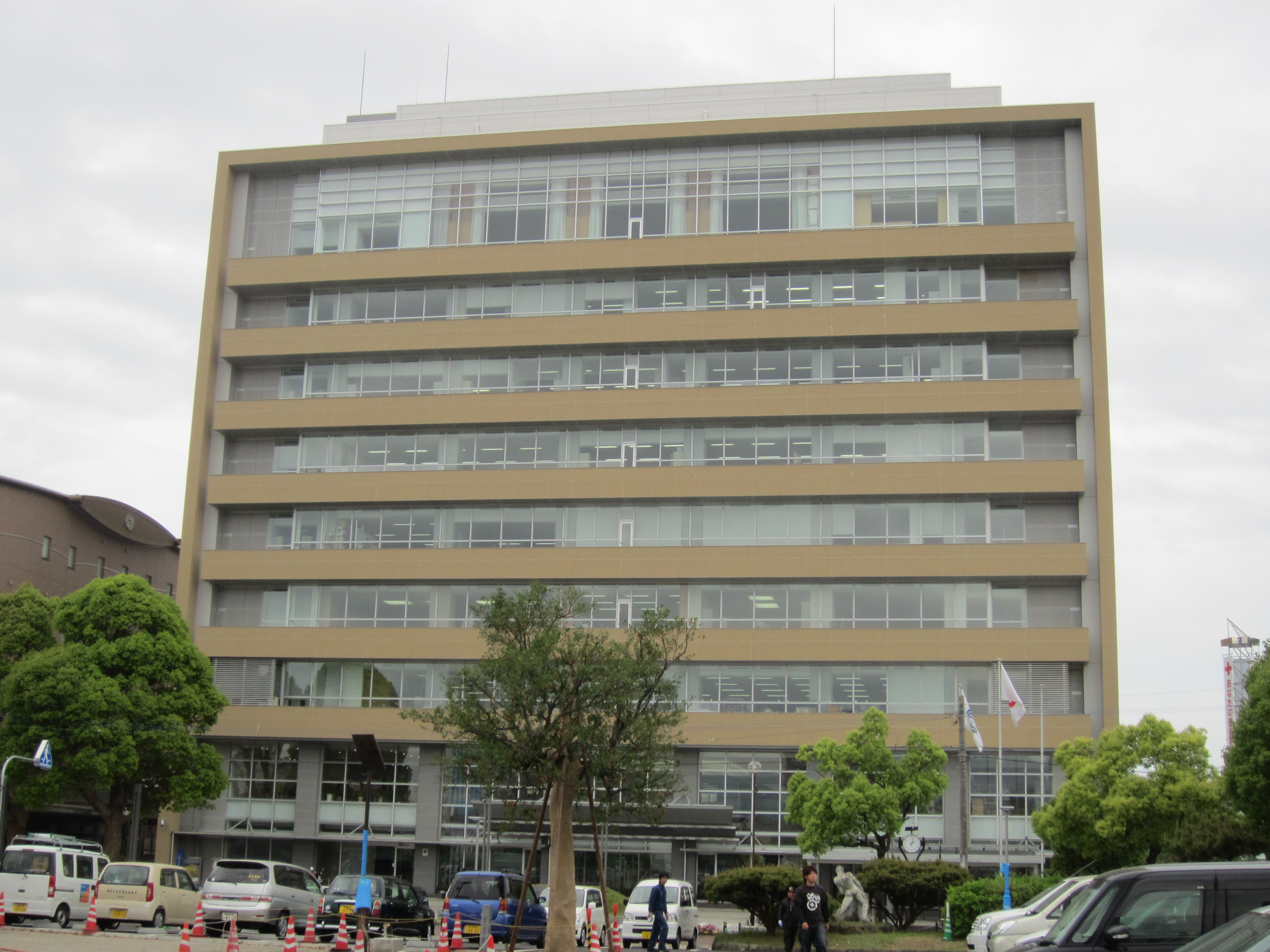
- Isahaya City Hall

- Flag Emblem
- Interactive map of Isahaya
- Location in Japan
- Coordinates: 32°50′36″N 130°3′11″E
- Country: Japan
- Region: Kyushu
- Prefecture: Nagasaki

Government
  - Mayor: Yukishige Okubo

Area
  - Total: 341.79 km^{2} (131.97 sq mi)

Population (June 1, 2024)
  - Total: 131,467
  - Density: 384.64/km^{2} (996.22/sq mi)
- Time zone: UTC+09:00 (JST)
- City hall address: 854-8601
- Website: Official website
- Symbols
- Flower: Rhododendron
- Tree: Euonymus hamiltonianus

Isahaya (諫早市, Isahaya-shi; Japanese pronunciation: [ì.sä́.hä́.jä́(.ɕì)]) is a city located in Nagasaki Prefecture, Japan. As of June 1, 2024, the city had an estimated population of 131,467 in 55169 households, and a population density of 380 people per km^{2}. The total area of the city is 341.79 km^{2} (131.97 sq mi).

== Geography ==
Located in the central part of Nagasaki Prefecture, Isahaya is surrounded by the ocean on three sides and the Tara mounts to the north. To the west is the base of the Nagasaki Peninsula and to the south is the base of Shimabara Peninsula. The city area faces Ōmura Bay in the northwest, Ariake Sea (Isahaya Bay) on the east and Tachibana Bay on the south. Major land reclamation projects have occurred which added plains to the Ariake Sea. The biggest is the Isahaya Bay reclamation project (諫早湾干拓事業) by the Ministry of Agriculture, Forestry and Fisheries that started in 1989. Embankments and sluice gates were built and a total of 35 km2 has been reclaimed as of 2018.

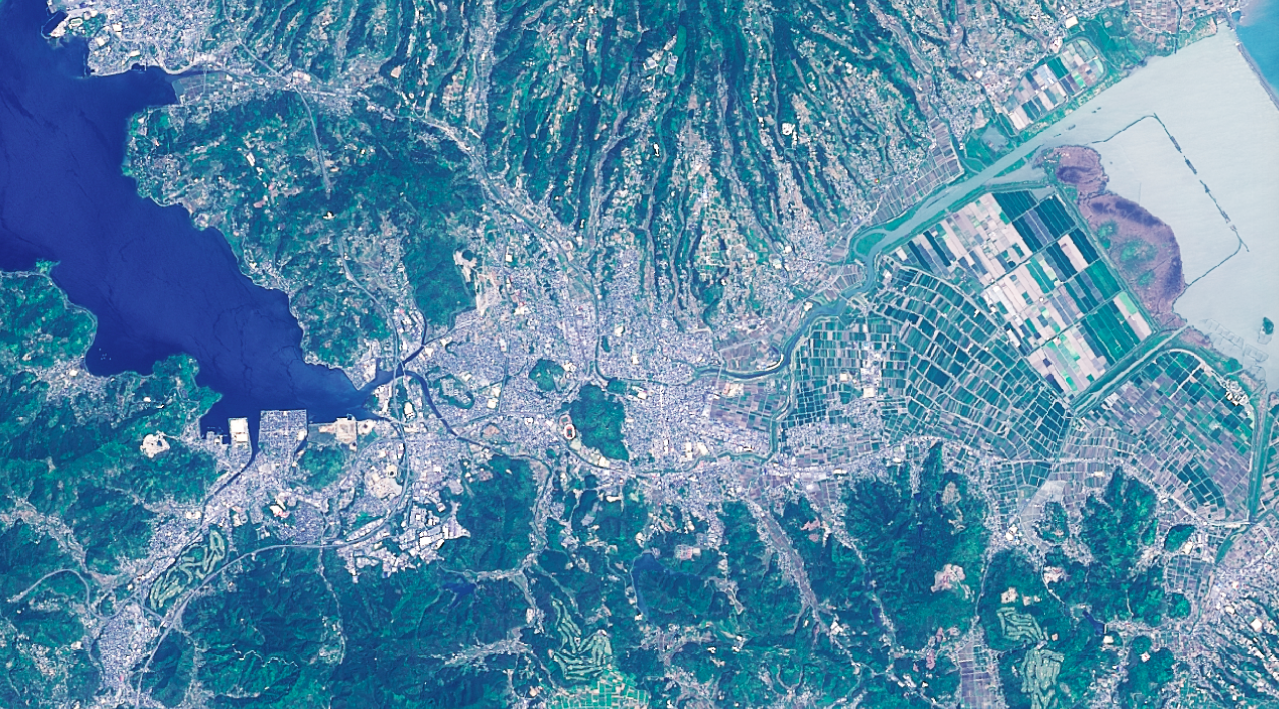
Satellite photograph of Isahaya City (provided by the Geospatial Information Authority of Japan)

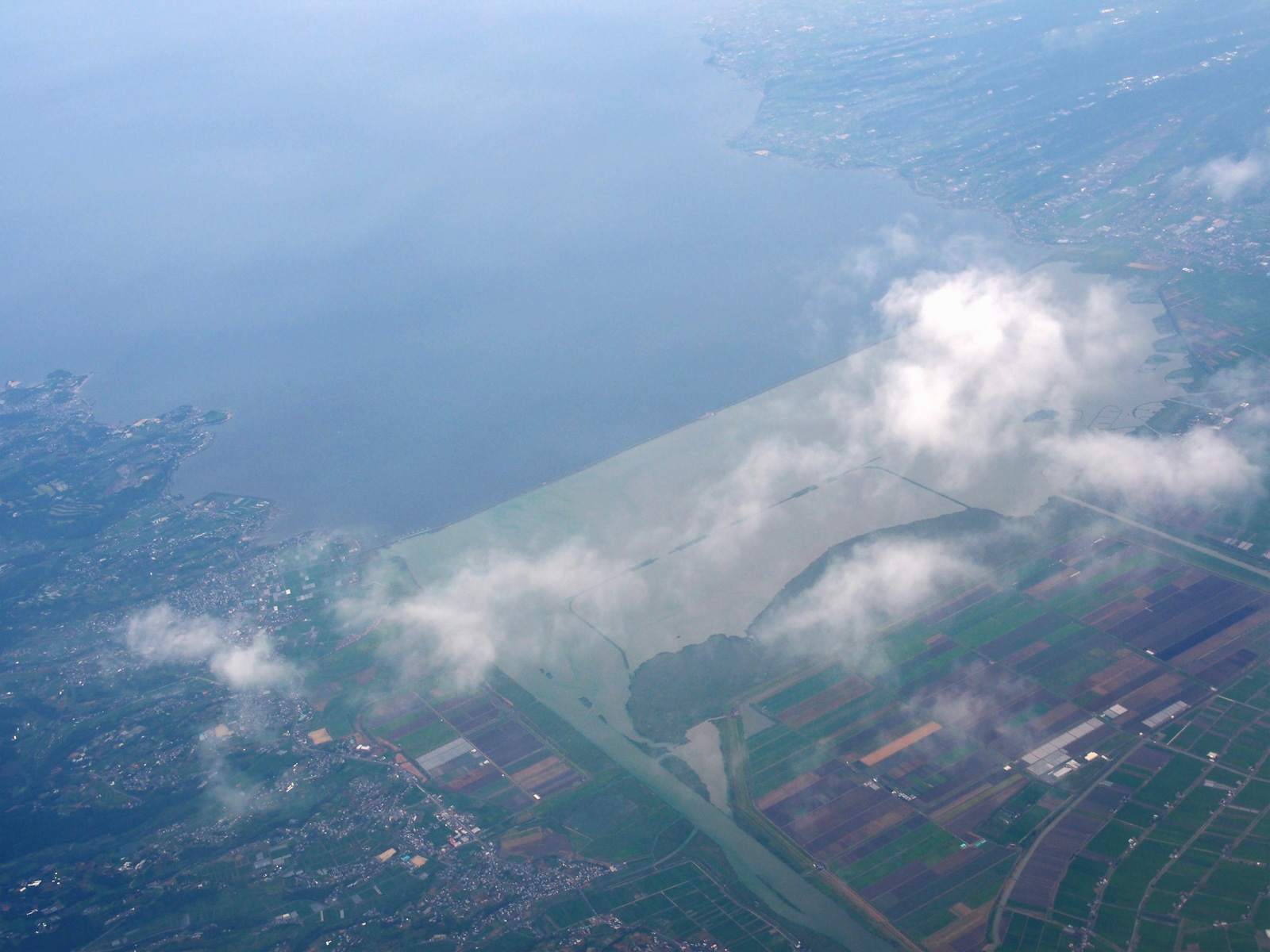
Isahaya Bay (2012)

=== Surrounding municipalities ===
Nagasaki Prefecture

- Nagasaki
- Nagayo
- Ōmura
- Unzen

Saga Prefecture

- Tara

=== Climate ===
Isahaya has a humid subtropical climate (Köppen Cfa) characterized by warm summers and cool winters with light to no snowfall. The average annual temperature in Isahaya is 16.3 °C. The average annual rainfall is 2213 mm with September as the wettest month. The temperatures are highest on average in August, at around 26.6 °C, and lowest in January, at around 6.5 °C.

=== Demographics ===
Per Japanese census data, the population of Isahaya is as shown below:

Historical population
Year	Pop.	±%
1940	79,974	—
1950	114,069	+42.6%
1960	110,965	−2.7%
1970	107,030	−3.5%
1980	127,339	+19.0%
1990	138,918	+9.1%
2000	144,299	+3.9%
2010	140,752	−2.5%
2020	133,852	−4.9%

== History ==
Isahaya was part of ancient Hizen Province. The place name of "Isahaya" appears in documents from the Kamakura period. During the Sengoku period, the area was controlled by a cadet branch of the Ryūzōji clan. It was part of the holdings of Saga Domain during the Edo Period. The town of Isahaya was established on April 1, 1889 with the creation of the modern municipalities system. On April 1, 1923, Isahaya annexed the villages of Isahaya and Kita-Isahaya. On September 1, 1940, it annexed the villages of Oguri, Ono, Yuki, Matsuyama, Motono, and Nagata to form the city of Isahaya.

In July 1957, a severe downpour within Nagasaki caused a large flood in Isahaya, with over 500 casualties and 3500 injuries reported in Isahaya alone (1957 Isahaya floods).

On March 1, 2005, the towns of Tarami, Moriyama, Iimori, Takaki and Konagai (all from Kitatakaki District) were merged to create the new and expanded city of Isahaya. The city was once part of Kitatakaki District, but due to this merger, the district has no more municipalities left and the district was officially dissolved.

== Government ==
Isahaya has a mayor-council form of government with a directly elected mayor and a unicameral city council of 26 members. Isahaya contributes four members to the Nagasaki Prefectural Assembly. In terms of national politics, the city is part of the Nagasaki 2nd district of the lower house of the Diet of Japan.

== Economy ==
Due to its geographic location, Isahaya has long been a transportation nexus for Nagasaki prefecture. Numerous industrial parks have attracted advanced technology companies such as electronics and aerospace-related components. In addition, the eastern part has been reclaimed since ancient times, and it is the largest grain-producing area in the prefecture. Surrounded on three sides, the ocean, commercial fishing is also important to the local economy.

== Education ==
Isahaya has 28 public elementary schools and 14 public junior high schools operated by the city government, and one junior high school operated by the Nagasaki Prefectural Board of Education. The prefecture also operates the five public high schools and one special education school for the handicapped. There are also one private junior high school and three private high schools. The private Nagasaki Wesleyan University is located in Isahaya.

== Transportation ==
=== Railways ===
JR Kyushu - Nishi Kyushu Shinkansen

Isahaya

JR Kyushu - Nagasaki Main Line

- ■ Konagai - Nagasato - Yue - Oe - Hizen-Nagata - Higashi-Isahaya - Isahaya - Nishi-Isahaya - Kikitsu - Ichinuno

JR Kyushu - Nagasaki Main Line (old line)

- ■ Kikitsu - Higashisono - Ōkusa

JR Kyushu - Ōmura Line

- ■ Isahaya

Shimabara Railway - Shimabara Railway Line

- ■ Isahaya - Hon-Isahaya - Saiwai - Ono - Kantakunosato - Moriyama - Kamanohana - Isahaya-higashi-kōkō

=== Highways ===
- Nagasaki Expressway
- National Route 34
- National Route 57
- National Route 207
- National Route 251

== Sister cities ==
- Athens, Tennessee, United States
- Zhangzhou, China
