= Ono Station (Nagasaki) =

Railway station in Isahaya, Nagasaki Prefecture, Japan

Ono Station 小野駅
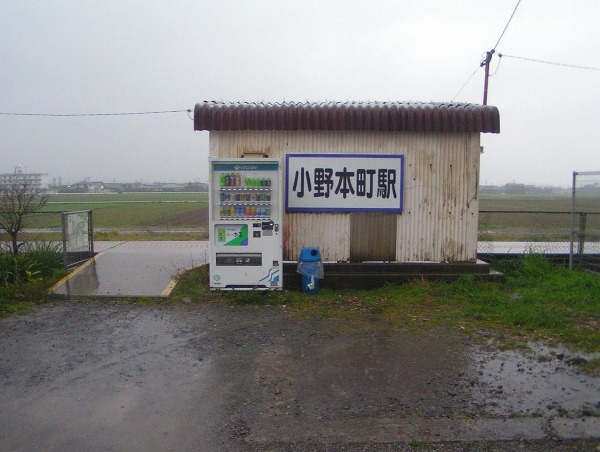
- Ono Station (Nagasaki)

General information
- Location: 520-13 Onomachi, Isahaya-shi, Nagasaki-ken 854-0035; Japan
- Coordinates: 32°50′2.31″N 130°5′9.15″E
- Operator: Shimabara Railway
- Line: ■ Shimabara Railway Line
- Distance: 4.8 km from Isahaya
- Platforms: 1 side platform

Other information
- Status: Unstaffed
- Website: Official website

History
- Opened: 20 March 1911
- Former names: Onomura (until 1964); Onohonmachi (until 2019)

Passengers
- FY2018: 72 daily

Services
Preceding station	Shimabara Railway	Following station
Saiwai towards Isahaya	Shimabara Railway Line	Kantakunosato towards Shimabarakō
Location
- Location within Nagasaki Prefecture Location within Japan

Ono Station (小野駅, Ono-eki) is a passenger railway station in located in the city of Isahaya, Nagasaki. It is operated by third-sector railway company Shimabara Railway.

== Lines ==
The station is served by the Shimabara Railway Line and is located 4.8 km from the starting point of the line at Isahaya.

== Station layout ==
The station consists of one side platform located on the south side of a single track. A waiting room is located in the middle of the platform. The station is unattended.

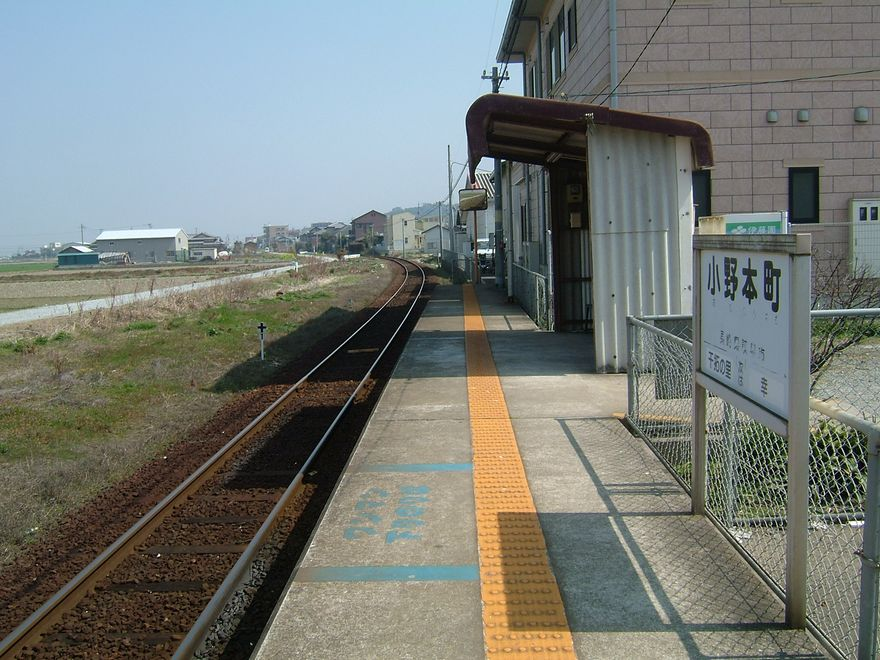
Platform

== History ==
This station was opened on 20 March 1911 as Onomura Station (小野村駅, Onomura-eki) and was renamed to Onohonmachi Station (小野本町駅, Onohonmachi-eki) on 7 January 1964. The station was then renamed to its present name on 1 October 2019.

== Passenger statistics ==
In fiscal 2018, there were a total of 26,124 boarding passengers, given a daily average of 72 passengers.

== Surrounding area ==
- Isahaya City Ono Elementary School

== See also ==
- List of railway stations in Japan
