= Nagasato Station =

Railway station in Isahaya, Nagasaki Prefecture, Japan

Nagasato Station 長里駅
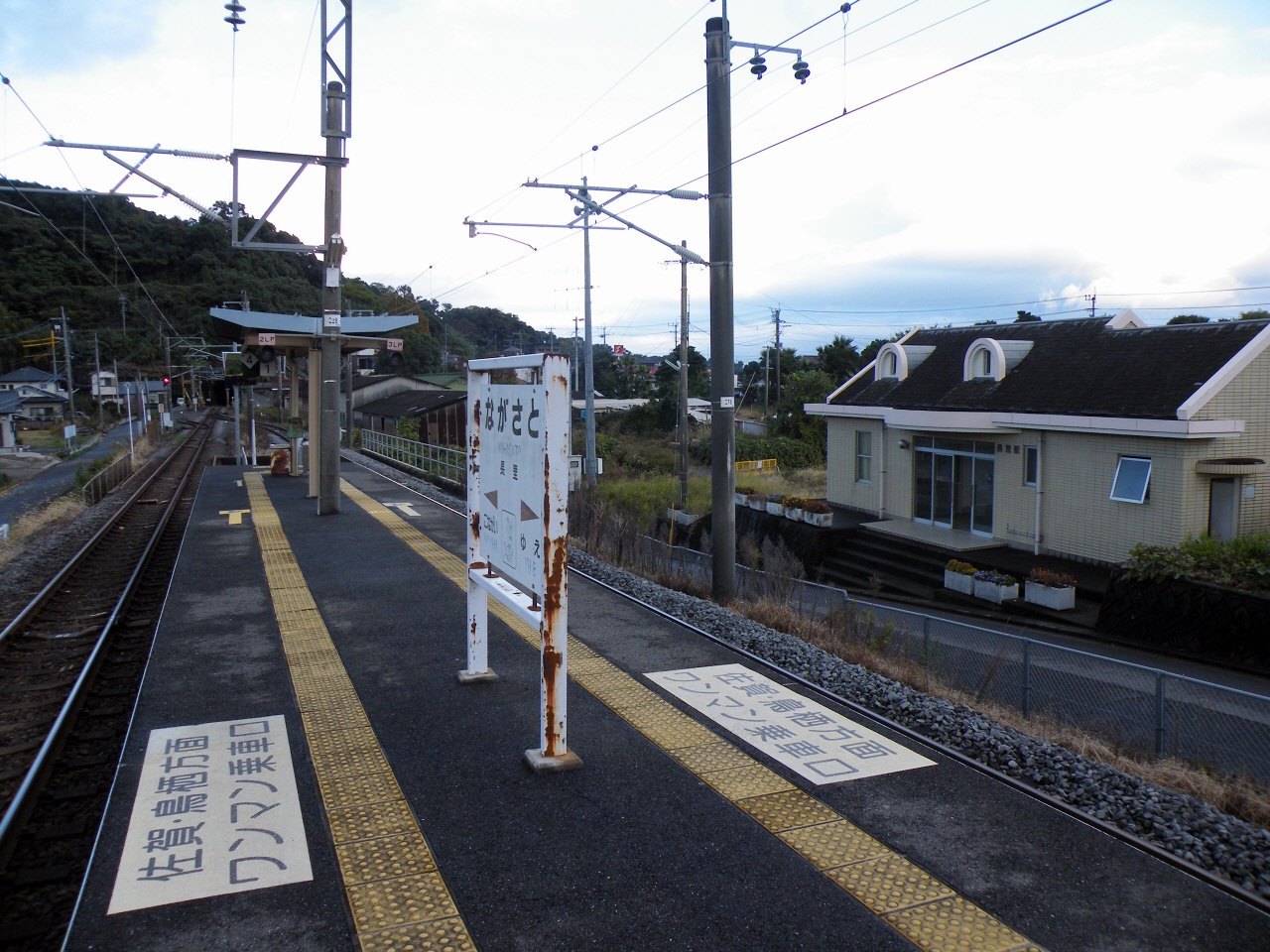
- Nagasato Station in 2008

General information
- Location: Konagaicho Uchigoshi, Isahaya-shi, Nagasaki-ken 859-0151; Japan
- Coordinates: 32°54′55″N 130°09′57″E
- Operator: JR Kyushu
- Line: JH Nagasaki Main Line
- Distance: 84.7 km from Tosu
- Platforms: 1 island platform
- Tracks: 2

Construction
- Structure type: Embankment
- Accessible: No - platform accessed by underpass with steps

Other information
- Status: Unstaffed
- Website: Official website

History
- Opened: 10 March 1990

Services
Preceding station	JR Kyushu	Following station
Yue towards Nagasaki	Nagasaki Line	Konagai towards Tosu
Location
- Location within Nagasaki Prefecture Location within Japan

Nagasato Station (長里駅, Nagasato-eki) is a passenger railway station located in the city of Isahaya, Nagasaki Prefecture, Japan. It is operated by JR Kyushu.

== Lines ==
The station is served by the Nagasaki Main Line and is located 84.7 km from the starting point of the line at Tosu.

== Station layout ==
The station consists of an island platform serving two tracks on an embankment. The station building is across a road and is unstaffed, serving only as a waiting room. Access to the platform is by means of an underpass through the embankment.

=== Platforms ===
1	■ JH Nagasaki Main Line	for Saga and Tosu
2	■ JH Nagasaki Main Line	for Isahaya and Nagasaki

== History ==
JR Kyushu opened the station on 10 March 1990 as an additional station on the existing track of the Nagasaki Main Line.

== Surrounding area ==
- National Route 207
- Isahaya City Nagasato Elementary School

== See also ==
- List of railway stations in Japan
