= Yue Station =

Railway station in Isahaya, Nagasaki Prefecture, Japan

Yue Station 湯江駅
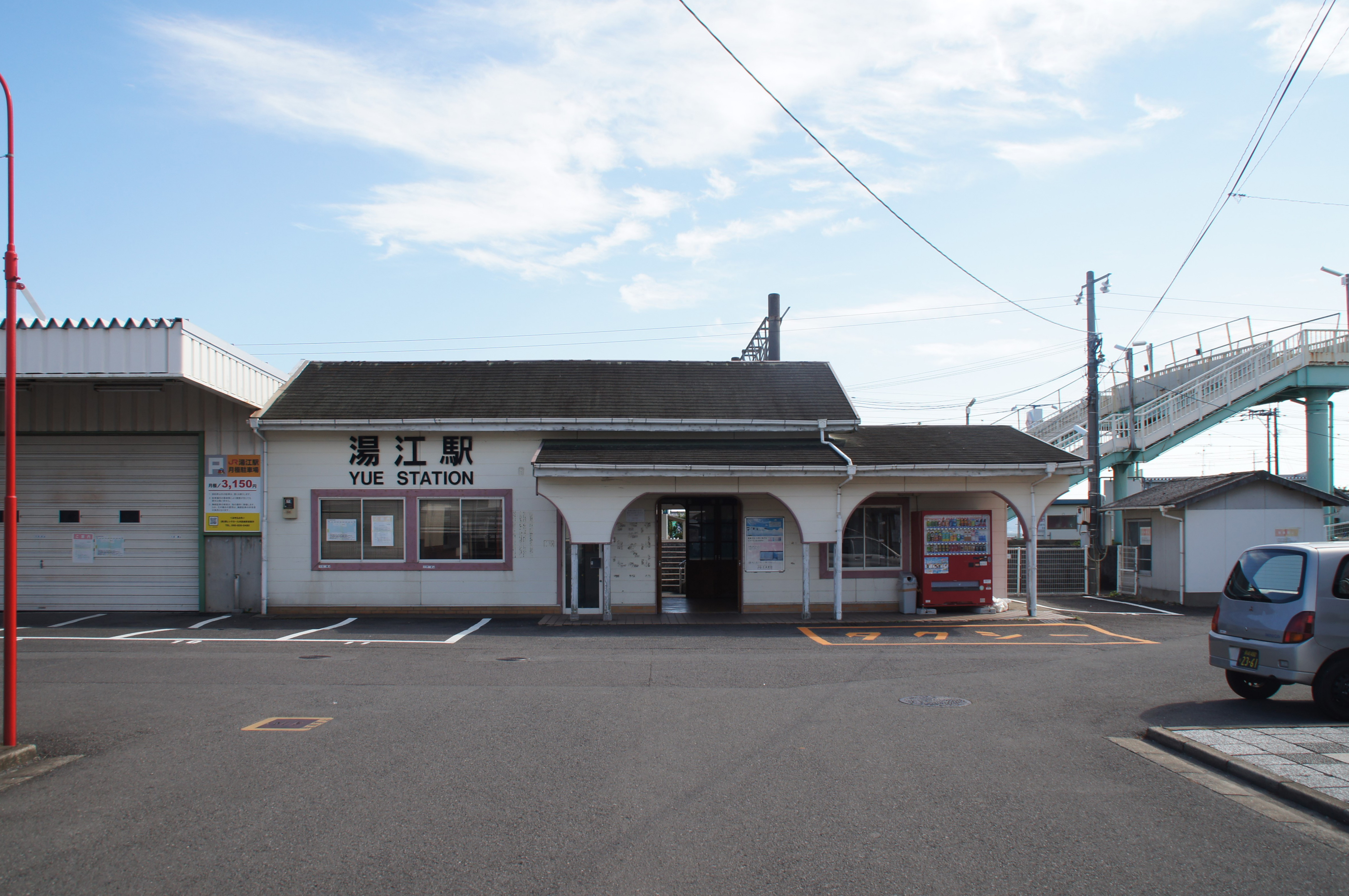
- Yue Station in September 2012

General information
- Location: Takakicho Sanbuichi, Isahaya-shi, Nagasaki-ken 859-0132; Japan
- Coordinates: 32°54′15″N 130°08′25″E
- Operator: JR Kyushu
- Line: JH Nagasaki Main Line
- Distance: 87.6 km from Tosu
- Platforms: 1 side + 1 island platforms
- Tracks: 3 + 1 siding

Construction
- Structure type: At grade
- Accessible: No - platforms linked by footbridge

Other information
- Status: Unstaffed
- Website: Official website

History
- Opened: 24 March 1934

Passengers
- FY2014: 253 daily

Services
| Preceding station | JR Kyushu | Following station |
|---|---|---|
| Oe towards Nagasaki | Nagasaki Line | Nagasato towards Tosu |
Location
- Location within Nagasaki Prefecture Location within Japan

Yue Station (湯江駅, Yue-eki) is a passenger railway station located in the city of Isahaya, Nagasaki Prefecture, Japan. It is operated by JR Kyushu.

== Lines ==
The station is served by the Nagasaki Main Line and is located 87.6 km from the starting point of the line at Tosu.

== Station layout ==
The station consists of a side platform and an island platform serving three tracks with a siding branching off track 1. The station building is a simple timber structure and is unstaffed, serving only as a waiting room with an automatic ticket vending machine. Access to the island platform is by means of a footbridge.

=== Platforms ===
| 1 | ■ JH Nagasaki Main Line | for Saga and Tosu |
| 2, 3 | ■ JH Nagasaki Main Line | for Isahaya and Nagasaki |

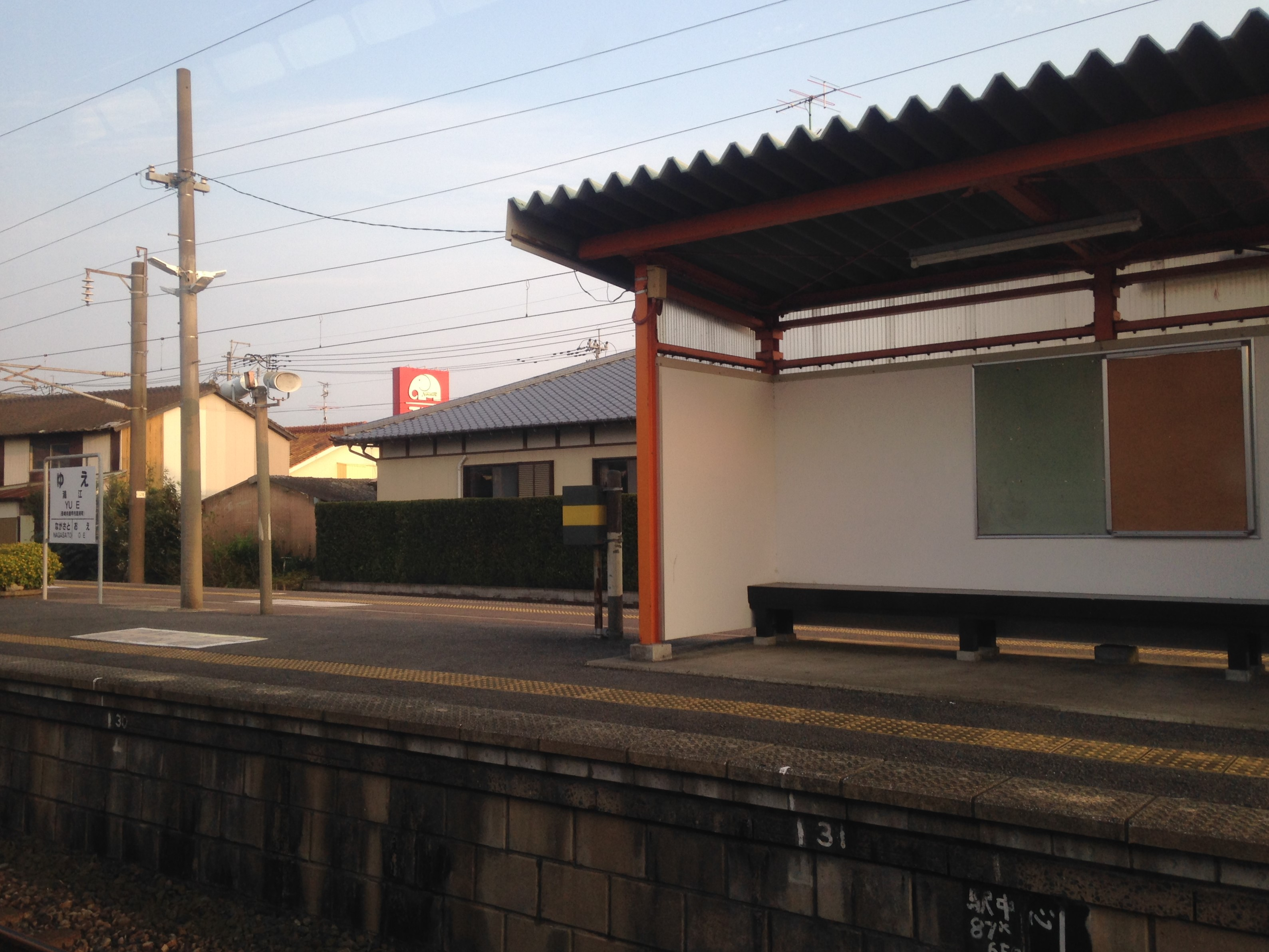
The island platform in September 2015

== History ==
Japanese Government Railways (JGR) built the station in the 1930s during the development of an alternative route for the Nagasaki Main Line along the coast of the Ariake Sea. In a phase of construction of what was at first called the Ariake West Line, a track was built from Isahaya (on the existing Nagasaki Main Line) north to Yue which opened on 24 March 1934 as the terminus of the track. A few months later, link up was made from Yue to Tara (which had been extended south from Hizen-Yamaguchi). With through traffic achieved from Hizen-Yamaguchi on the new route to Nagasaki, the entire stretch of track was designated as part of the Nagasaki Main Line on 1 December 1934. With the privatization of Japanese National Railways (JNR), the successor of JGR, on 1 April 1987, control of the station passed to JR Kyushu.

== Passenger statistics ==
In fiscal 2014, there were a total of 92,199 boarding passengers, given a daily average of 253 passengers.

== Surrounding area ==
- Isahaya Municipal Takaki Junior High School
- Yue Elementary School
- Wadoji Temple

== See also ==
- List of railway stations in Japan
