= Tara Station =

Railway station in Tara, Saga Prefecture, Japan

Tara Station 多良駅
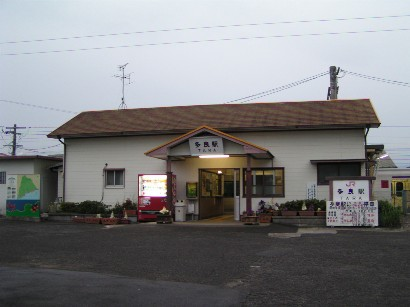
- Tara Station in 2005

General information
- Location: 1702-5 Tara, Tara-cho, Fujitsu-gun, Saga-ken 849-1602; Japan
- Coordinates: 33°01′34″N 130°10′33″E
- Operator: JR Kyushu
- Line: JH Nagasaki Main Line
- Distance: 67.7 km from Tosu
- Platforms: 1 side + 1 island platforms
- Tracks: 3 + 2 sidings

Construction
- Structure type: At grade
- Accessible: No - access to island platform by footbridge

Other information
- Status: Staffed ticket window (outsourced)
- Website: Official website

History
- Opened: 16 April 1934

Passengers
- FY2016: 323 daily

Services
Preceding station	JR Kyushu	Following station
Hizen-Ōura towards Nagasaki	Nagasaki Line	Hizen-Iida towards Tosu
Location
- Location within Saga Prefecture Location within Japan

Tara Station (多良駅, Tara-eki) is a passenger railway station located in the city of Tara, Fujitsu District, Saga Prefecture, Japan. It is operated by JR Kyushu and is on the Nagasaki Main Line.

== Lines ==
The station is served by the Nagasaki Main Line and is located 67.7 km from the starting point of the line at Tosu. Besides the local services on the line, about two trains a day from the JR Kyushu Limited Express service Kamome between Hakata and Nagasaki also stop at the station.

== Station layout ==
The station consists of a side platform and an island platform serving three tracks. A siding branches off track 1 and another off track 3. The station building is a timber built structure of western design and houses a waiting room and a ticket window. Access to the island platform is by means of a footbridge.

Management of the station has been outsourced to the JR Kyushu Tetsudou Eigyou Co., a wholly owned subsidiary of JR Kyushu specialising in station services. It staffs the ticket window which is equipped with a POS machine but does not have a Midori no Madoguchi facility.

=== Platforms ===
1, 2, 3	■ JH Nagasaki Main Line	for Saga and Tosu for Nagasaki

== History ==
Japanese Government Railways (JGR) built the station in the 1930s during the development of an alternative route for the Nagasaki Main Line along the coast of the Ariake Sea which was at first known as the Ariake Line. The track was built from Hizen-Yamaguchi to Hizen-Ryūō, opening on 9 March 1930, and then to Hizen-Hama, opening on 30 November 1930. In the next phase of expansion, the track was extended to Tara which opened on 16 April 1934 as the new southern terminus. On 1 December 1934, the entire route was completed and through-traffic achieved from Hizen-Yamaguchi through the station to Nagasaki. The track was then redesignated as part of the Nagasaki Main Line. With the privatization of Japanese National Railways (JNR), the successor of JGR, on 1 April 1987, control of the station passed to JR Kyushu.

== Passenger statistics ==
In fiscal 2016, the station was used by an average of 323 passengers daily (boarding passengers only), and it ranked 300th among the busiest stations of JR Kyushu.

== Environs ==
- Tara Town Hall
- Saga Prefectural Tara High School
- Tara Town Tara Elementary School
- Tara Town Tara Junior High School
- Japan National Route 207

== See also ==
- List of railway stations in Japan
