= Ōkusa Station =

Railway station in Isahaya, Nagasaki Prefecture, Japan

Okusa Station 大草駅
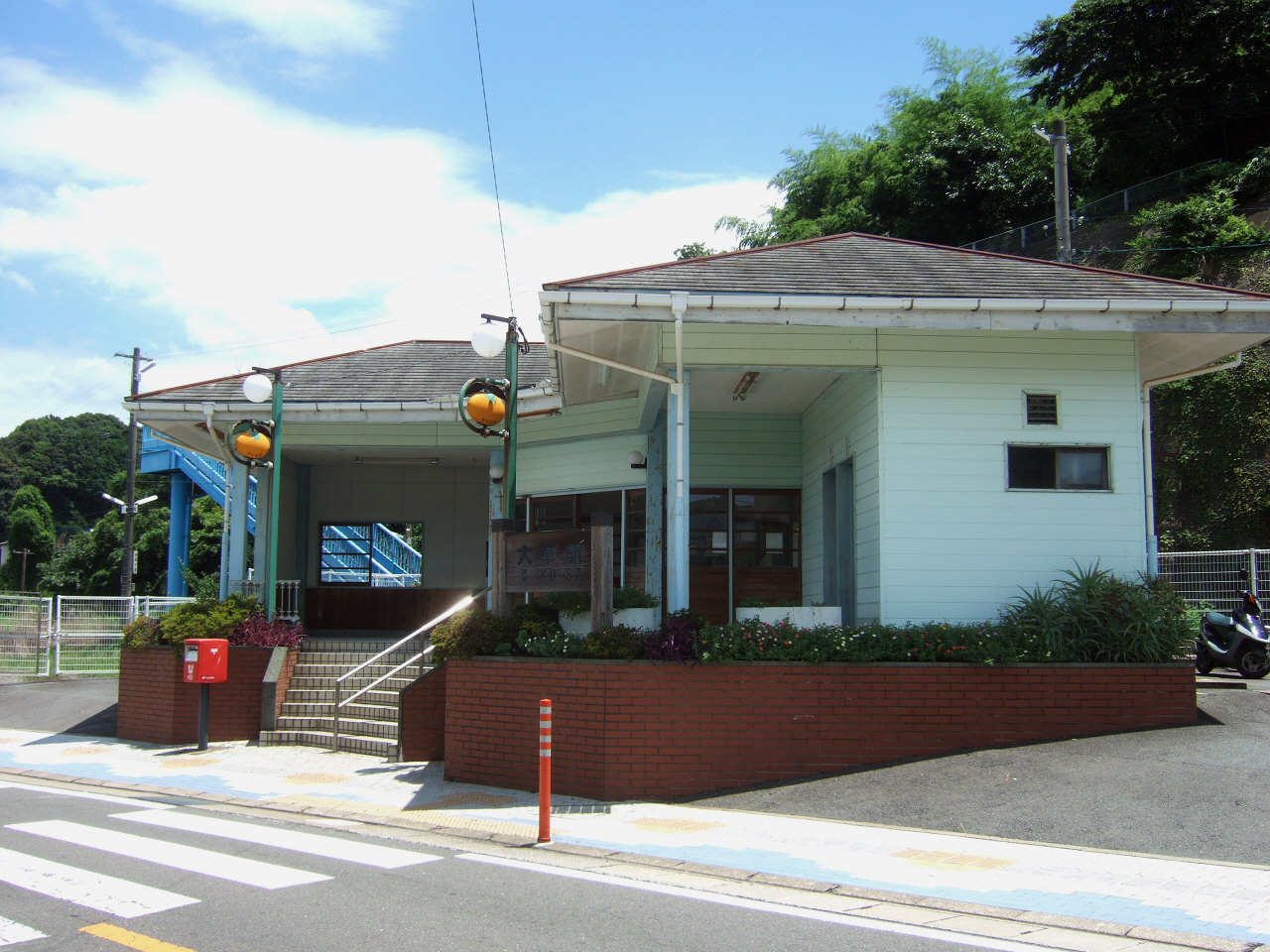
- Okusa Station in 2008

General information
- Location: Taramicho Motogama, Isahaya-shi, Nagasaki-ken 859-0414; Japan
- Coordinates: 32°51′36″N 129°56′18″E
- Operator: JR Kyushu
- Line: JH Nagasaki Main Line
- Distance: 7.2 km from Kikitsu (starting point of branch)
- Platforms: 2 side platforms
- Tracks: 2 + 1 siding

Construction
- Structure type: At grade

Other information
- Status: Unstaffed
- Website: Official website

History
- Opened: 27 November 1898
- Former names: Higashisono Signal Box (until 1 October 1966)

Passengers
- FY2014: 139 daily
Location
- Location within Nagasaki Prefecture Location within Japan

Ōkusa Station (大草駅, Ōkusa-eki) is a passenger railway station located in the city of Isahaya, Nagasaki Prefecture, Japan. It is operated by JR Kyushu.

== Lines ==
The station is served by the old line or the Nagayo branch of the Nagasaki Main Line and is located 7.2 km from the branch point at Kikitsu. Only local trains run on this branch.

== Station layout ==
The station consists of two side platforms serving two tracks with a siding branching off track 1. The station building is a v-shaped modern timber structure which is unstaffed and houses a waiting room with a SUGOCA farecard reader. Access to the opposite side platform is by means of a footbridge.

=== Platforms ===
1	■ JH Nagasaki Main Line	for Isahaya, Saga and Tosu
2	■ JH Nagasaki Main Line	for Nagasaki

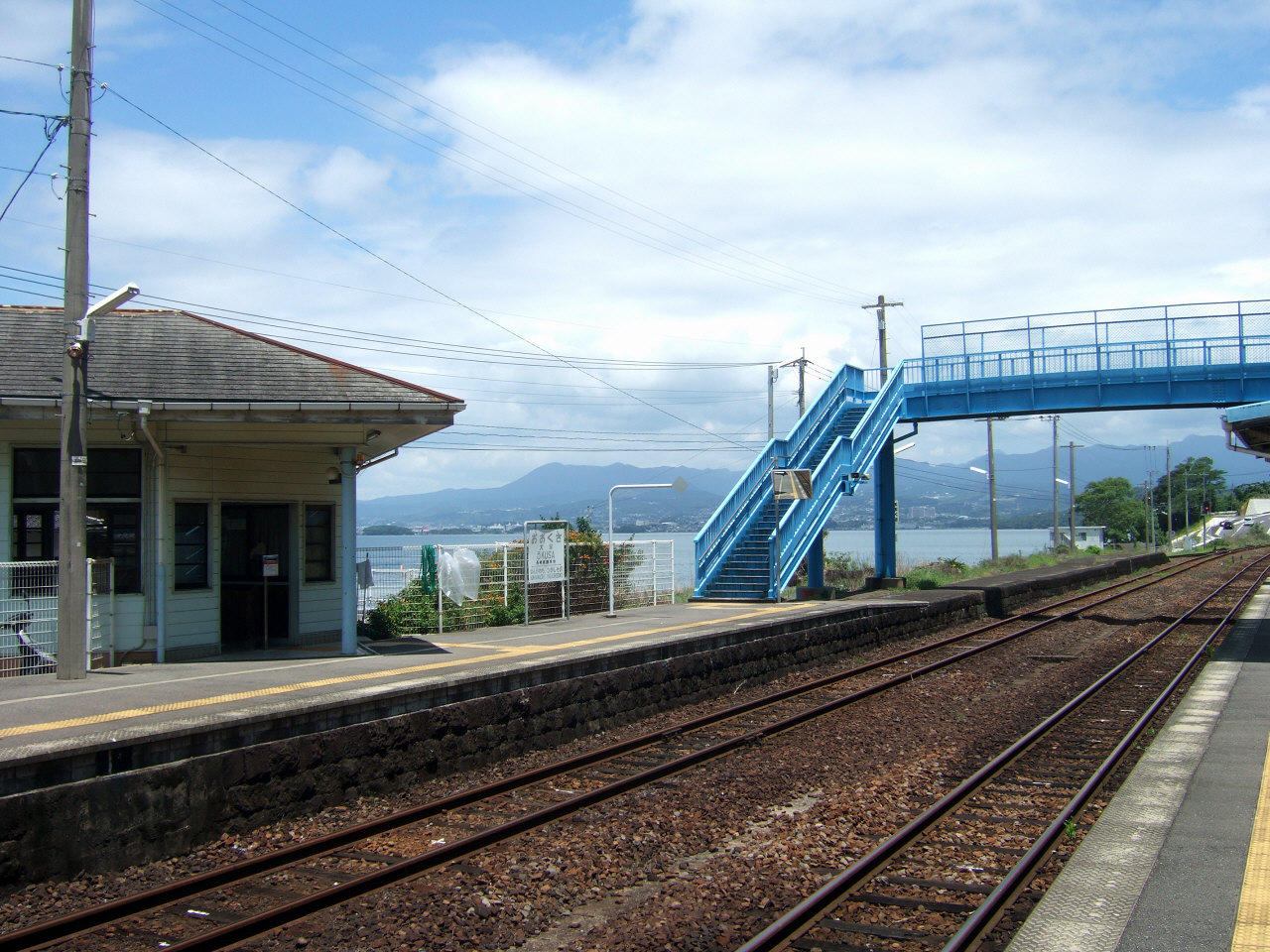
A view of the station platforms and tracks.

== Adjacent stations ==
←	Service	→
Nagasaki Main Line (old line)
Higashisono	Local	Honkawachi

== History ==
The private Kyushu Railway, had opened a track from Tosu to Saga by 5 May 1895, and thereafter expanding southwards in phases, as part of the construction of a line to Nagasaki. Separately, a track was laid from Urakami (then known as Nagasaki) north to Nagayo, which opened on 22 July 1897 as the terminus. On 27 November 1898, a link up was made between Nagayo and the track from Tosu which had expanded south to Ōmura. Okusa was opened on the same day as an intermediate station on the new stretch of track. When the Kyushu Railway was nationalized on 1 July 1907, Japanese Government Railways (JGR) took over control of the station. On 12 October 1909, the track from Tosu through Haiki, Ōmura, Nagayo to Nagasaki was designated the Nagasaki Main Line. On 2 October 1972, a shorter inland bypass route was opened between Kikitsu through Ichinuno to Urakami was opened, which became known as the new line or Ichinuno branch of the Nagasaki Main Line. The section serving Okusa became known as the old line or the Nagayo branch. With the privatization of Japanese National Railways (JNR), the successor of JGR, on 1 April 1987, control of the station passed to JR Kyushu.

== Passenger statistics ==
In fiscal 2014, there were a total of 50,679 boarding passengers, giving a daily average of 139 passengers.

== Environs ==
- National Route 207
- Ōmura Bay

== See also ==
- List of railway stations in Japan
