= Michinoo Station =

Railway station in Nagayo, Nagasaki Prefecture, Japan

Michinoo Station 道ノ尾駅
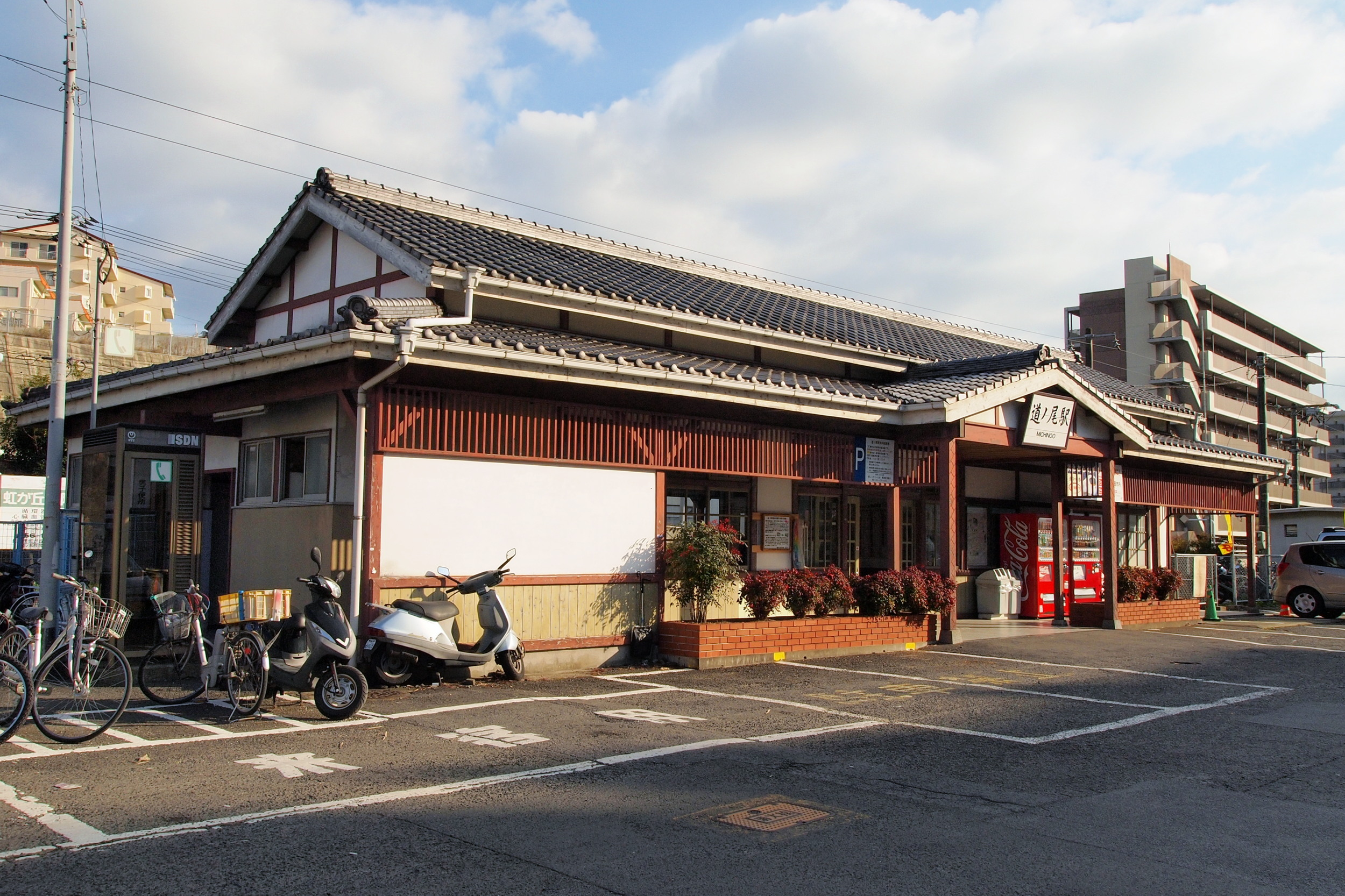
- Michinoo Station in 2009

General information
- Location: Kodago, Nagayo-cho, Nishisonogi-gun, Nagasak-ken 851-2127; Japan
- Coordinates: 32°48′16″N 129°51′10″E
- Operator: JR Kyushu
- Line: JH Nagasaki Main Line
- Distance: 18.9 km from Kikitsu (starting point of branch)
- Platforms: 1 side platform
- Tracks: 1

Construction
- Structure type: At grade
- Parking: Available
- Cycle facilities: Bike shed
- Accessible: Yes - no steps to platform

Other information
- Status: Staffed ticket window (outsourced)
- Website: Official website

History
- Opened: 22 July 1897

Passengers
- FY2020: 950 daily
- Rank: 139th (among JR Kyushu stations)
Location
- Location within Nagasaki Prefecture Location within Japan

Michinoo Station (道ノ尾駅, Michinoo-eki) is a passenger railway station located in the town of Nagayo, Nishisonogi District, Nagasaki Prefecture, Japan. It is operated by JR Kyushu.

== Lines ==
The station is served by the old line or the Nagayo branch of the Nagasaki Main Line and is located 18.9 km from the branch point at Kikitsu. Only local trains run on this branch.

== Station layout ==
The station consists of a side platform serving a single track at grade. The station building is a timber structure of traditional Japanese design and houses a waiting room and staffed ticket window. A bike shed and parking lots are available at the station forecourt. Across from the platform can be seen the remnants of another, disused platform and the trackbed of a second track, now removed.

Management of the station has been outsourced to the JR Kyushu Tetsudou Eigyou Co., a wholly owned subsidiary of JR Kyushu specialising in station services. It staffs the ticket window which is equipped with a POS machine but does not have a Midori no Madoguchi facility.

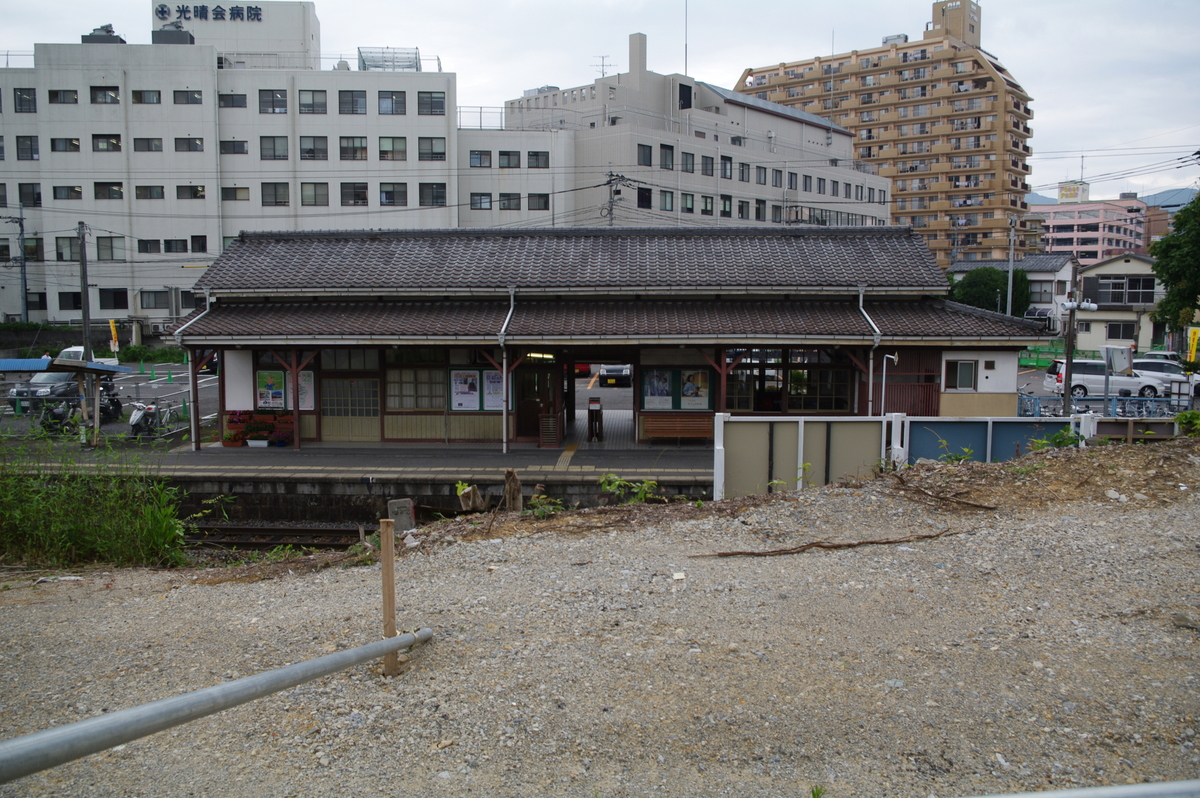
A more distant view of the station forecourt showing the parking lots and bike shed.

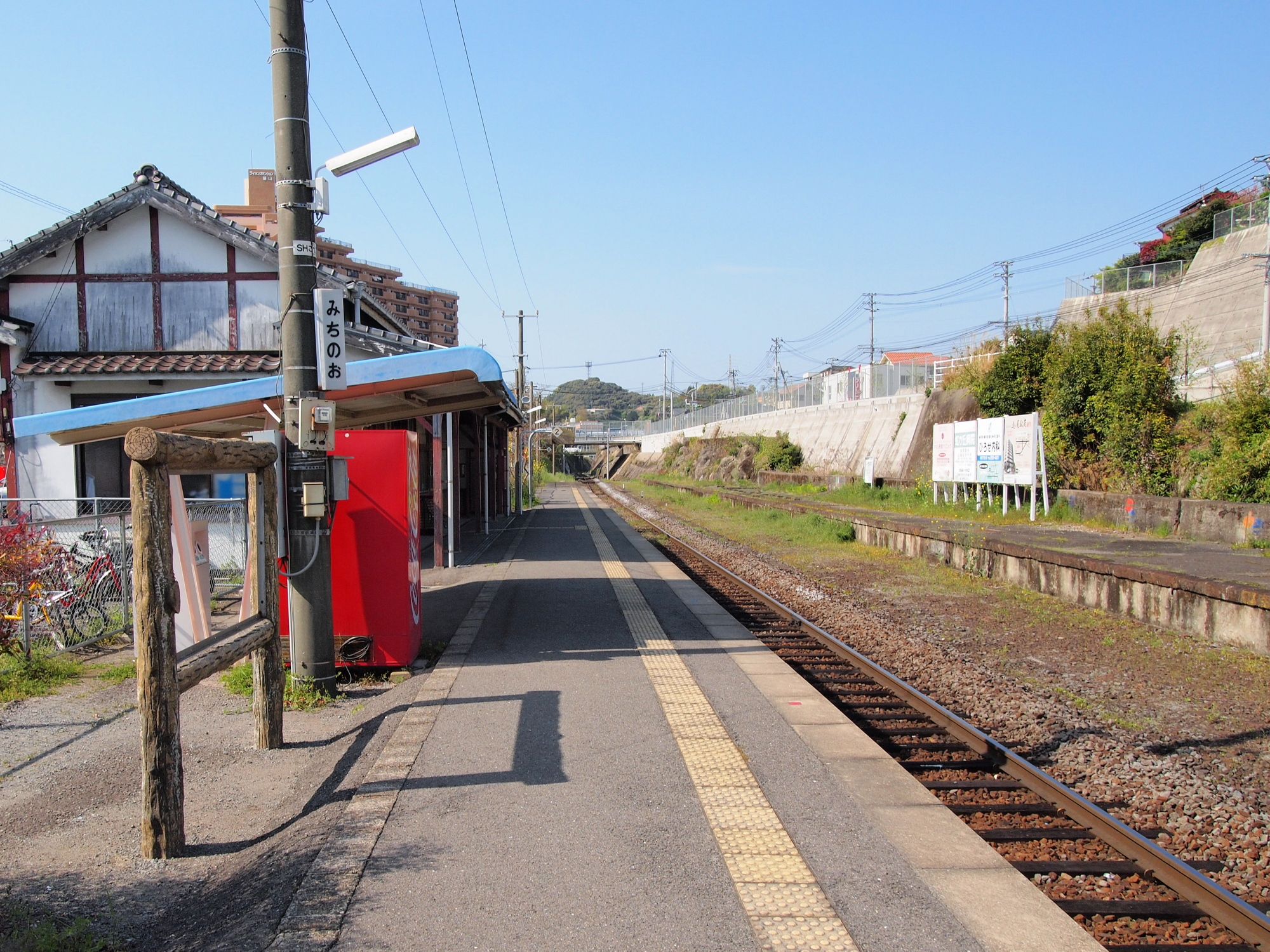
A view of the platform and track. Note to the right the trackbed and disused platform.

== Adjacent stations ==
←	Service	→
Nagasaki Main Line (old line)
Kōda	Local	Nishi-Urakami

== History ==
The private Kyushu Railway, had opened a track from Tosu to Saga by 5 May 1895, and thereafter expanding southwards in phases, as part of the construction of a line to Nagasaki. Separately, a track was laid from Urakami (then known as Nagasaki) north to Nagayo, which opened on 22 July 1897 as the terminus. On the same day, Michinoo was opened as an intermediate station between Urakami and Nagayo. When the Kyushu Railway was nationalized on 1 July 1907, Japanese Government Railways (JGR) took over control of the station. On 12 October 1909, track from Tosu through Haiki, Ōmura, Michinoo to Nagasaki was designated the Nagasaki Main Line. On 2 October 1972, a shorter inland bypass route was opened between Kikitsu through Ichinuno to Urakami was opened, which became known as the new line or Ichinuno branch of the Nagasaki Main Line. The section serving Michinoo became known as the old line or the Nagayo branch. With the privatization of Japanese National Railways (JNR), the successor of JGR, on 1 April 1987, control of the station passed to JR Kyushu.

== Passenger statistics ==
In fiscal 2020, the station was used by an average of 950 passengers daily (boarding passengers only), and it ranked 139th among the busiest stations of JR Kyushu.

== Surrounding area ==
- National Route 206
- Nagasaki City Iwaya Junior High School
- Nagasaki Technical High School
- Nagasaki Iwaya Post Office
