= Hizen-Koga Station =

Railway station in Nagasaki, Nagasaki Prefecture, Japan

Hizen Koga Station 肥前古賀駅
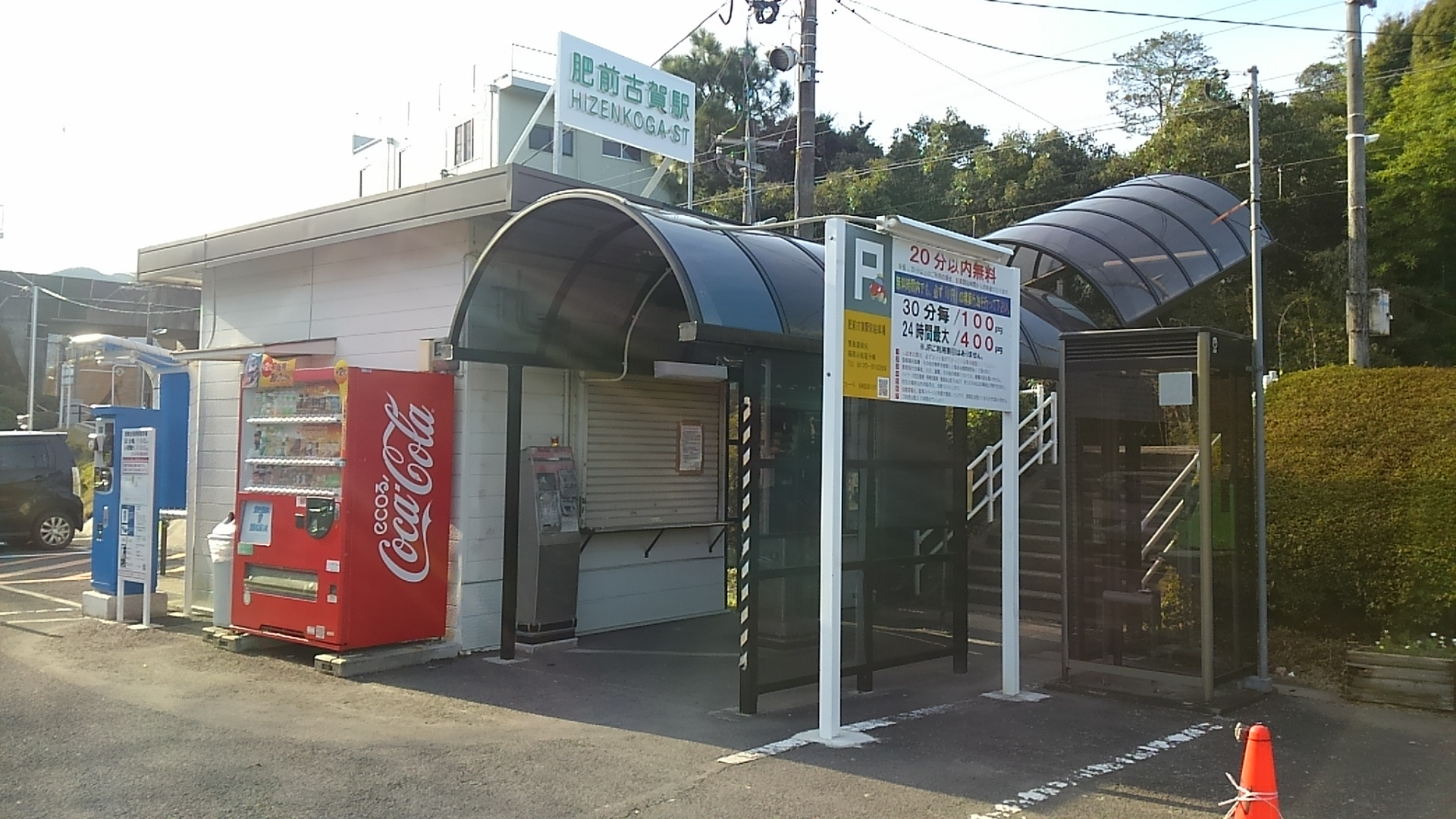
- Hizen-Koga Station in 2015

General information
- Location: Japan
- Coordinates: 32°47′54″N 129°57′06″E
- Operator: JR Kyushu
- Line: ■ Nagasaki Main Line
- Distance: 112.3 km from Tosu
- Platforms: 1 side platform
- Tracks: 1

Construction
- Structure type: At grade (sidehill cutting)
- Accessible: Yes - ramp to platform

Other information
- Status: Unstaffed
- Website: Official website

History
- Opened: 2 October 1972

Passengers
- FY2016: 423 daily
- Rank: 262nd (among JR Kyushu stations)
Location
- Location within Japan

Hizen-Koga Station (肥前古賀駅, Hizen-Koga-eki) is a railway station in Nagasaki City, Nagasaki Prefecture, Japan. It is operated by JR Kyushu and is on the Nagasaki Main Line.

== Lines ==
The station is served by the Nagasaki Main Line and is located 112.3 km from the starting point of the line at Tosu. Besides local trains on the line, some trains of the Rapid Seaside Liner service between Sasebo and Nagasaki also stop at the station.

== Station layout ==
The station consists of a side platform serving a single track on a sidehill cutting. From the station entrance on the access road, a flight of steps and a ramp lead up to the platform. There is no station building. A small shed at the station entrance houses a ticket window which is, however, no longer staffed. An automatic ticket vending machine and a SUGOCA card reader is provided. Limited parking is available by the side of access road.

== Adjacent stations ==
←	Service	→
Nagasaki Main Line
Ichinuno	Local	Utsutsugawa
JR Kyushu Rapid
Ichinuno	Seaside Liner (some trains)	Utsutsugawa

== History ==
On 2 October 1972, Japanese National Railways (JNR) opened a new, shorter, inland route for the Nagasaki Main Line between Kikitsu and Urakami, thus bypassing the longer coastal route via Nagayo. Hizen-Koga was opened on the same day as one of the intermediate stations along this new route. With the privatization of JNR on 1 April 1987, control of the station passed to JR Kyushu.

In January 2015, JR Kyushu announced that Hizen-Koga would become an unstaffed station from 14 March 2015. This was part of a major effort by the company to reduce its operating deficit by ceasing to staff 32 stations in its network.

== Passenger statistics ==
In fiscal 2016, the station was used by an average of 423 passengers daily (boarding passengers only), and it ranked 262nd among the busiest stations of JR Kyushu.

== Environs ==
- Route 34
- Nagasaki City Koga Elementary School
