= Utsutsugawa Station =

Railway station in Nagasaki, Nagasaki Prefecture, Japan

Utsutsugawa Station 現川駅

General information
- Location: Japan
- Coordinates: 32°47′28″N 129°55′35″E
- Operator: JR Kyushu
- Line: ■ Nagasaki Main Line
- Distance: 114.8 km from Tosu
- Platforms: 2 side platforms
- Tracks: 2 + 1 through-track

Construction
- Structure type: At grade
- Parking: Available
- Cycle facilities: Designated parking area for bikes
- Accessible: No - platforms linked by footbridge

Other information
- Status: Unstaffed
- Website: Official website

History
- Opened: 2 October 1972

Passengers
- FY2016: 617 daily
- Rank: 218th (among JR Kyushu stations)
Location
- Location within Japan

Utsutsugawa Station (現川駅, Utsutsugawa-eki) is a railway station in Nagasaki City, Nagasaki Prefecture, Japan. It is operated by JR Kyushu and is on the Nagasaki Main Line.

== Lines ==
The station is served by the Nagasaki Main Line and is located 114.8 km from the starting point of the line at Tosu. Besides local trains on the line, some trains of the Rapid Seaside Liner service between Sasebo and Nagasaki also stop at the station.

== Station layout ==
The station consists of two side platforms serving two tracks. A third through-track runs in between the two. There is no station building. A small shed, integrated with the shelter for platform 1 used to house a ticket window but, as the station is now unstaffed, it has been converted into a compartment for an automatic ticket vending machine. A SUGOCA card reader is also provided at the station entrance. Although it is possible to access platform 1 from the access road without any steps, access to platform 2 requires the use of a footbridge.

== Adjacent stations ==
←	Service	→
Nagasaki Main Line
Hizen-Koga	Local	Urakami
JR Kyushu Rapid
Hizen-Koga (some); Kikitsu	Seaside Liner (some trains)	Urakami

== History ==
On 2 October 1972, Japanese National Railways (JNR) opened a new, shorter, inland route for the Nagasaki Main Line between Kikitsu and Urakami, thus bypassing the longer coastal route via Nagayo. Utsutsugawa was opened on the same day as one of the intermediate stations along this new route. With the privatization of JNR on 1 April 1987, control of the station passed to JR Kyushu.

== Passenger statistics ==
In fiscal 2016, the station was used by an average of 617 passengers daily (boarding passengers only), and it ranked 218th among the busiest stations of JR Kyushu.

== Environs ==
- Nagasaki Junshin University and College
- Nagasaki City Takashirodai Elementary School Utsutsugawa Branch
- Nagasaki Bypass
