= Honkawachi Station =

Railway station in Nagayo, Nagasaki Prefecture, Japan

Honkawachi Station 本川内駅
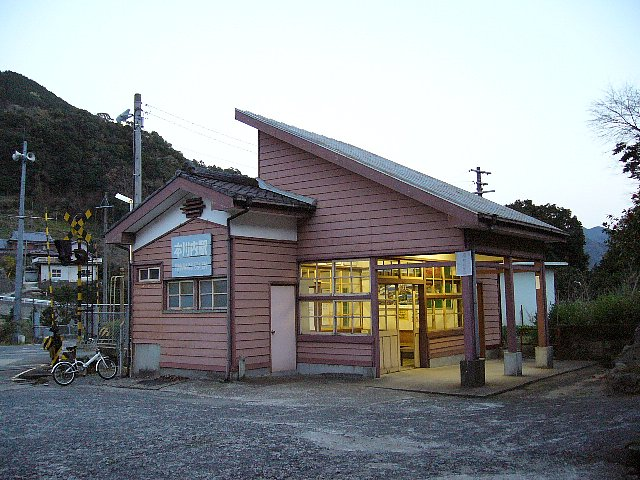
- Honkawachi Station in 2006

General information
- Location: Hongawachigo, Nagayo-cho, Nishisonogi-gun, Nagasaki-ken 851-2122; Japan
- Coordinates: 32°49′58″N 129°53′59″E
- Operator: JR Kyushu
- Line: JH Nagasaki Main Line
- Distance: 12.3 km from Kikitsu (starting point of branch)
- Platforms: 1 side platform
- Tracks: 1

Construction
- Structure type: At grade
- Accessible: Yes - ramps lead to platform

Other information
- Status: Unstaffed
- Website: Official website

History
- Opened: 1 October 1943
- Former names: Hongawachi Signal Box (until 1 June 1952)

Passengers
- FY2014: 81 daily
Location
- Location within Nagasaki Prefecture Location within Japan

Honkawachi Station (本川内駅, Honkawachi-eki) is a passenger railway station located in the town of Nagayo, Nishisonogi District, Nagasaki Prefecture, Japan. It is operated by JR Kyushu.

== Lines ==
The station is served by the old line or the Nagayo branch of the Nagasaki Main Line and is located 12.3 km from the branch point at Kikitsu. Only local trains run on this branch.

== Station layout ==
The station consists of a side platform serving a single track. The station building is a timber structure and is unstaffed, housing only a waiting area, an automatic ticket vending machine and a SUGOCA card reader. A ramp leads from the station building to the platform. In the past, the platform track was on a siding and trains stopping at the station used to have to perform a switchback manoeuvre to enter and leave. This has been discontinued with the new platform built on the main track but the remnants of the switches and tracks used in the switchback can still be seen.

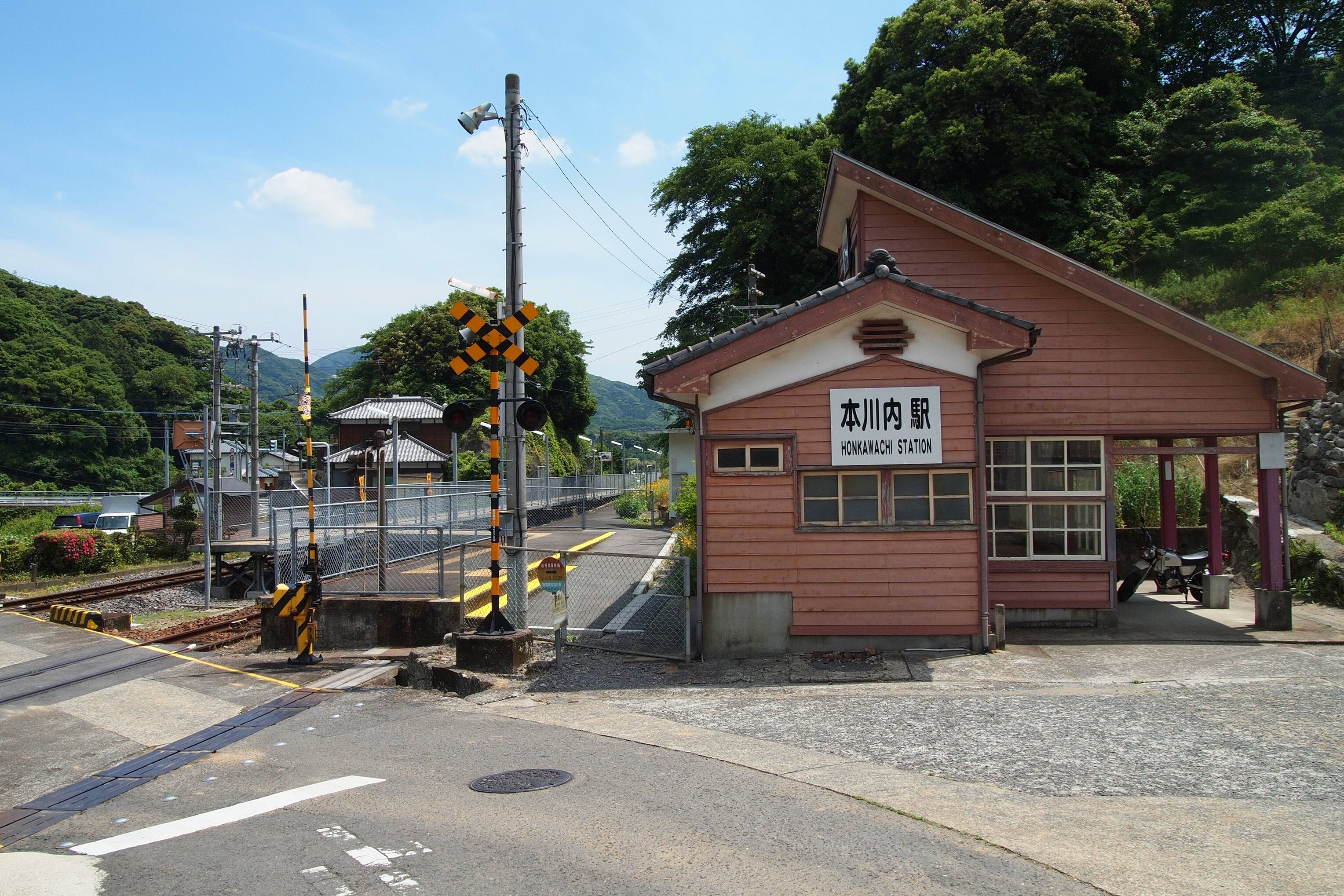
Side view of station showing the system of accessibility ramps leading to the platform.

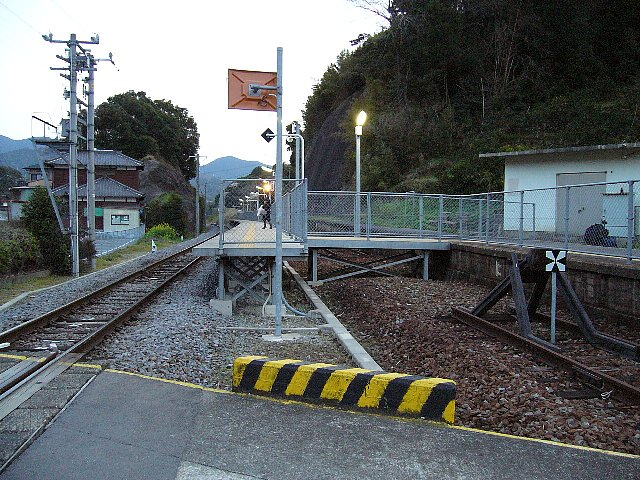
A view of the platform. To the right can be seen the remnants of the siding and old platform which was entered with a switchback.

== Adjacent stations ==
| ← | Service | → |
Nagasaki Main Line (old line)
| Ōkusa | Local | Nagayo |

== History ==
Japanese National Railways (JNR) opened the station as Hongawachi Signal Box (本川内信号場, Hongawachi-shingōba) on 1 October 1943 on the existing track of the Nagasaki Main Line. On 1 June 1952, the facility was upgraded to a full passenger station. At the same time, the reading of the station name was changed from Hongawachi to Honkawachi, with no change to the corresponding kanji. On 2 October 1972, a shorter inland bypass route was opened between Kikitsu through Ichinuno to Urakami was opened, which became known as the new line or Ichinuno branch of the Nagasaki Main Line. The section serving Honkawachi which ran from Kikitsu through Nagayo to Urakami became known as the old line or the Nagayo branch. With the privatization of JNR on 1 April 1987, control of the station passed to JR Kyushu.

== Passenger statistics ==
In fiscal 2014, there were a total of 29,561 boarding passengers, giving a daily average of 81 passengers.

== Surrounding area ==
- Nagayo Dam
- Nagayo Town Araikiri Elementary School

== See also ==
- List of railway stations in Japan
