= Higashisono Station =

Railway station in Isahaya, Nagasaki Prefecture, Japan

Higashisono Station 東園駅
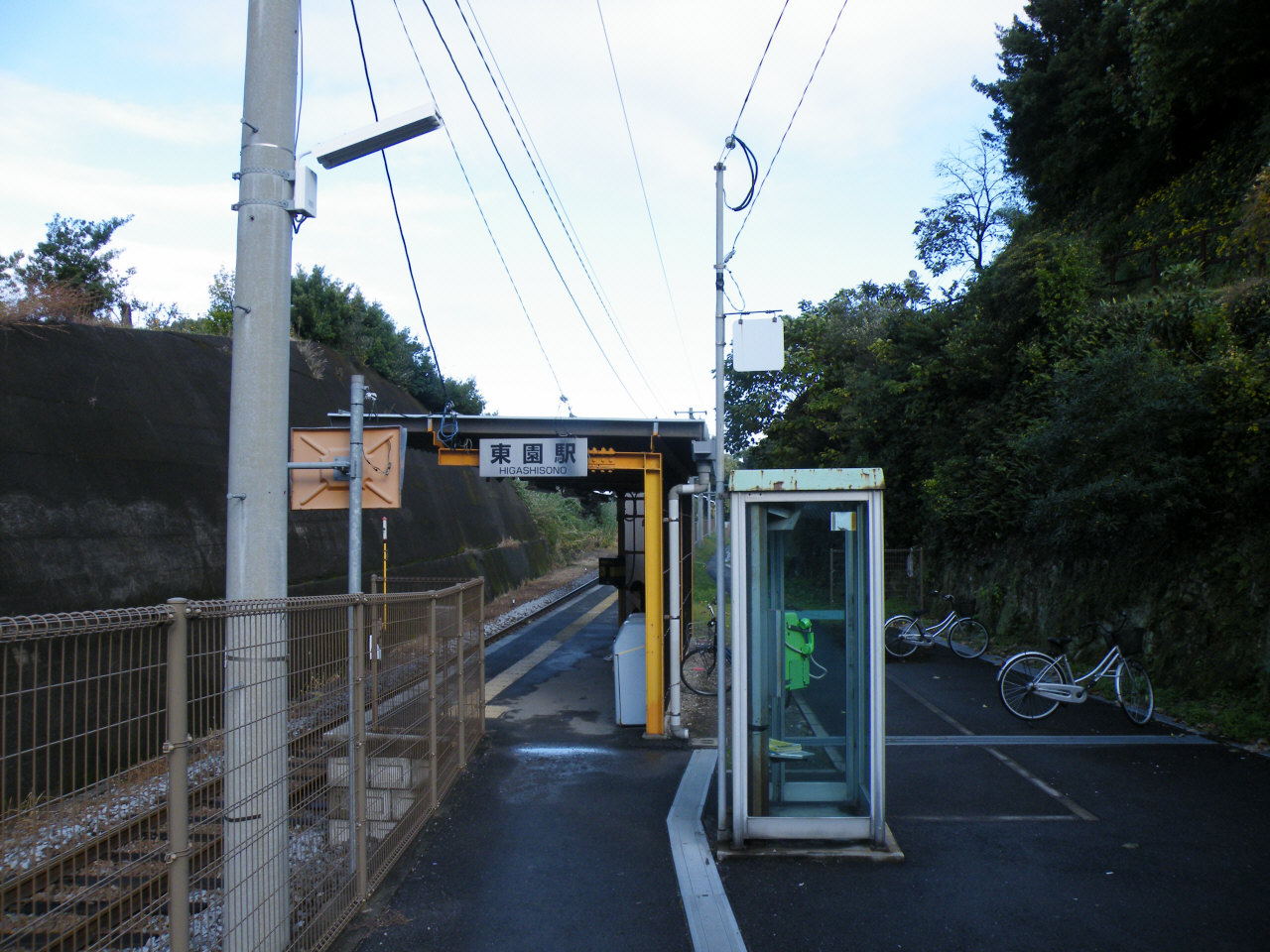
- Higashisono Station in 2008

General information
- Location: Taramicho Higashizono, Isahaya-shi, Nagasaki-ken 859-0411; Japan
- Coordinates: 32°50′47″N 129°57′38″E
- Operator: JR Kyushu
- Line: JH Nagasaki Main Line
- Distance: 3.5 km from Kikitsu (starting point of branch)
- Platforms: 1 side platform
- Tracks: 1

Construction
- Structure type: At grade (cutting)

Other information
- Status: Unstaffed
- Website: Official website

History
- Opened: 1 October 1961
- Former names: Higashisono Signal Box (until 1 October 1966)

Passengers
- FY2014: 73 daily
Location
- Location within Nagasaki Prefecture Location within Japan

Higashisono Station (東園駅, Higashisono-eki) is a passenger railway station located in the city of Isahaya, Nagasaki Prefecture, Japan. It is operated by JR Kyushu.

== Lines ==
The station is served by the old line or the Nagayo branch of the Nagasaki Main Line and is located 3.5 km from the branch point at Kikitsu. Only local trains run on this branch.

== Station layout ==
The station consists of a side platform serving a single track within a cutting. There is no station building, only a rudimentary shelter on the platform which houses an automatic ticket vending machine as well as a SUGOCA card reader.

== Adjacent stations ==
←	Service	→
Nagasaki Main Line (old line)
Kikitsu	Local	Ōkusa

== History ==
Japanese National Railways (JNR) opened Higashisono Signal Box on 1 October 1961 as an additional facility on the existing track of the Nagasaki Main Line. It was upgraded to a passenger station on 1 October 1966. On 2 October 1972, a shorter inland bypass route was opened between Kikitsu through Ichinuno to Urakami was opened, which became known as the new line or Ichinuno branch of the Nagasaki Main Line. The section serving Higashisono which ran from Kikitsu through Nagayo to Urakami became known as the old line or the Nagayo branch. With the privatization of JNR on 1 April 1987, control of the station passed to JR Kyushu.

== Passenger statistics ==
In fiscal 2014, there were a total of 26,713 boarding passengers, giving a daily average of 73 passengers.

== Surrounding area ==
- Isahaya City Hall Tarami Branch Ōkusa Office
- National Route 207
- Ōmura Bay

== See also ==
- List of railway stations in Japan
