= Nishi-Urakami Station =

Railway station in Nagasaki, Nagasaki Prefecture, Japan

Nishi-Urakami Station 西浦上駅
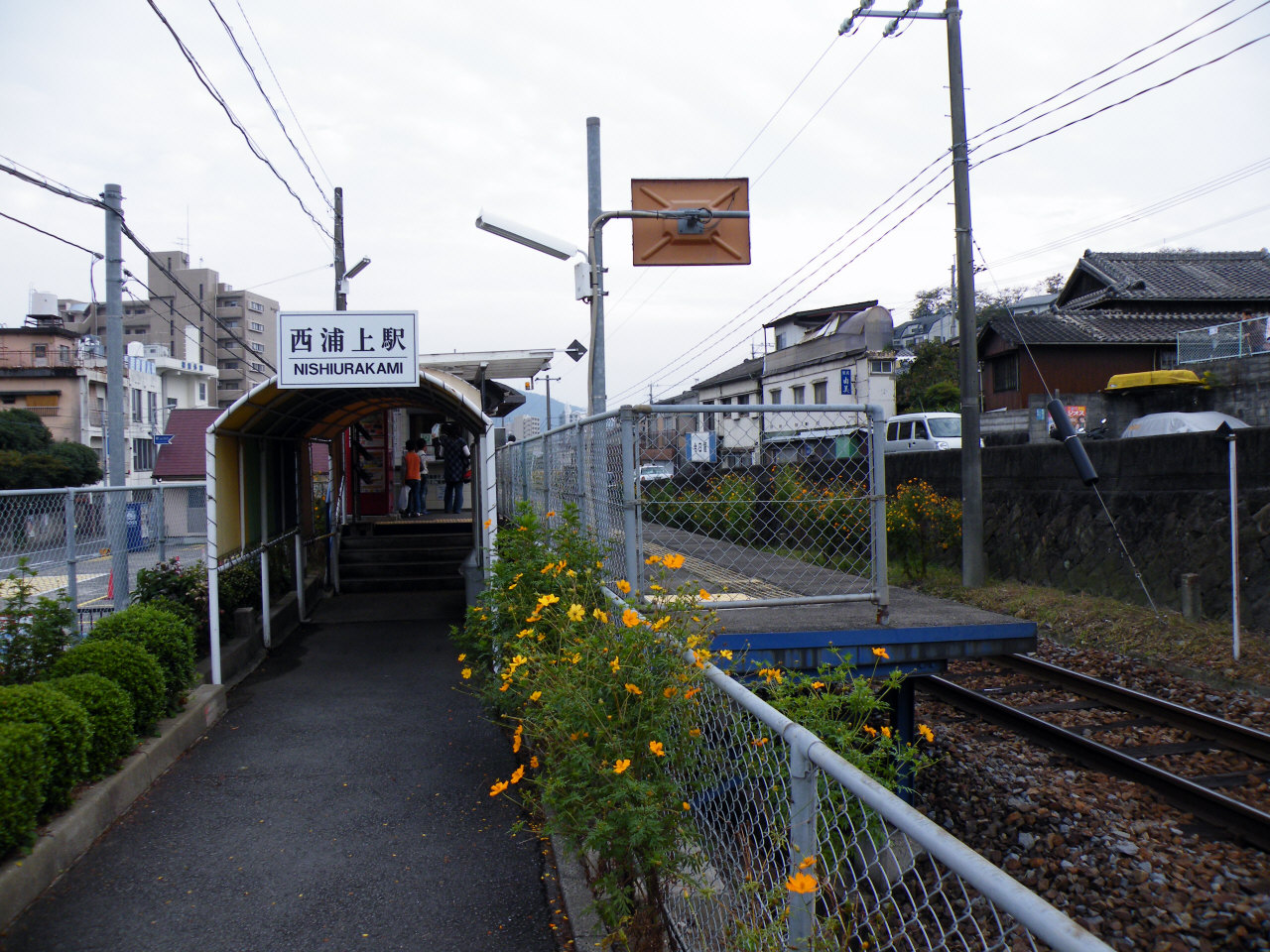
- Nishi-Urakami Station in 2008

General information
- Location: Japan
- Coordinates: 32°47′26″N 129°51′32″E
- Operator: JR Kyushu
- Line: ■ Nagasaki Main Line
- Distance: 20.6 km from Kikitsu (starting point of branch)
- Platforms: 1 side platform
- Tracks: 1

Construction
- Structure type: At grade
- Accessible: Yes – no steps to platform

Other information
- Status: Unstaffed
- Website: Official website

History
- Opened: 9 March 1987

Passengers
- FY2016: 728 daily
- Rank: 201st (among JR Kyushu stations)
Location
- Location within Japan

Nishi-Urakami Station (西浦上駅, Nishi-Urakami-eki) is a railway station in Nagasaki, Nagasaki Prefecture, Japan. It is operated by JR Kyushu and is on the Nagasaki Main Line.

== Lines ==
The station is served by the old line or the Nagayo branch of the Nagasaki Main Line and is located 20.6 km from the branch point at Kikitsu. Only local trains run on this branch.

== Station layout ==
The station consists of a side platform serving a single track at grade. There is no station building. A small shed on the platform houses a ticket window which is, however, now unstaffed. An automatic ticket vending machine and a weather shelter are provided.

== Adjacent stations ==
←	Service	→
Nagasaki Main Line (old line)
Michinoo	Local	Urakami

== History ==
Japanese National Railways (JNR) opened the station as a temporary stop on 9 March 1987. With the privatization of JNR on 1 April 1987, JR Kyushu took over control of the facility and upgraded it to a full passenger station.

== Passenger statistics ==
In fiscal 2016, the station was used by an average of 728 passengers daily (boarding passengers only), and it ranked 201st among the busiest stations of JR Kyushu.

== Environs ==
- Nagasaki University – 20 minutes on foot
- Nagasaki Electric Tramway: Sumiyoshi tram stop
- Lawson Nagasaki Nakazono store
- Joyful Sun Sumiyoshi store
- Chitosepia shopping complex
  - Nagasaki City Hall Nishi-Urakami Branch
  - Nagasaki City Kita Community Center
  - Nagasaki Sumiyoshi Post Office
  - Daiei Chitosepia store
