= Nishi-Isahaya Station =

Railway station in Isahaya, Nagasaki Prefecture, Japan

Nishi-Isahaya Station 西諫早駅
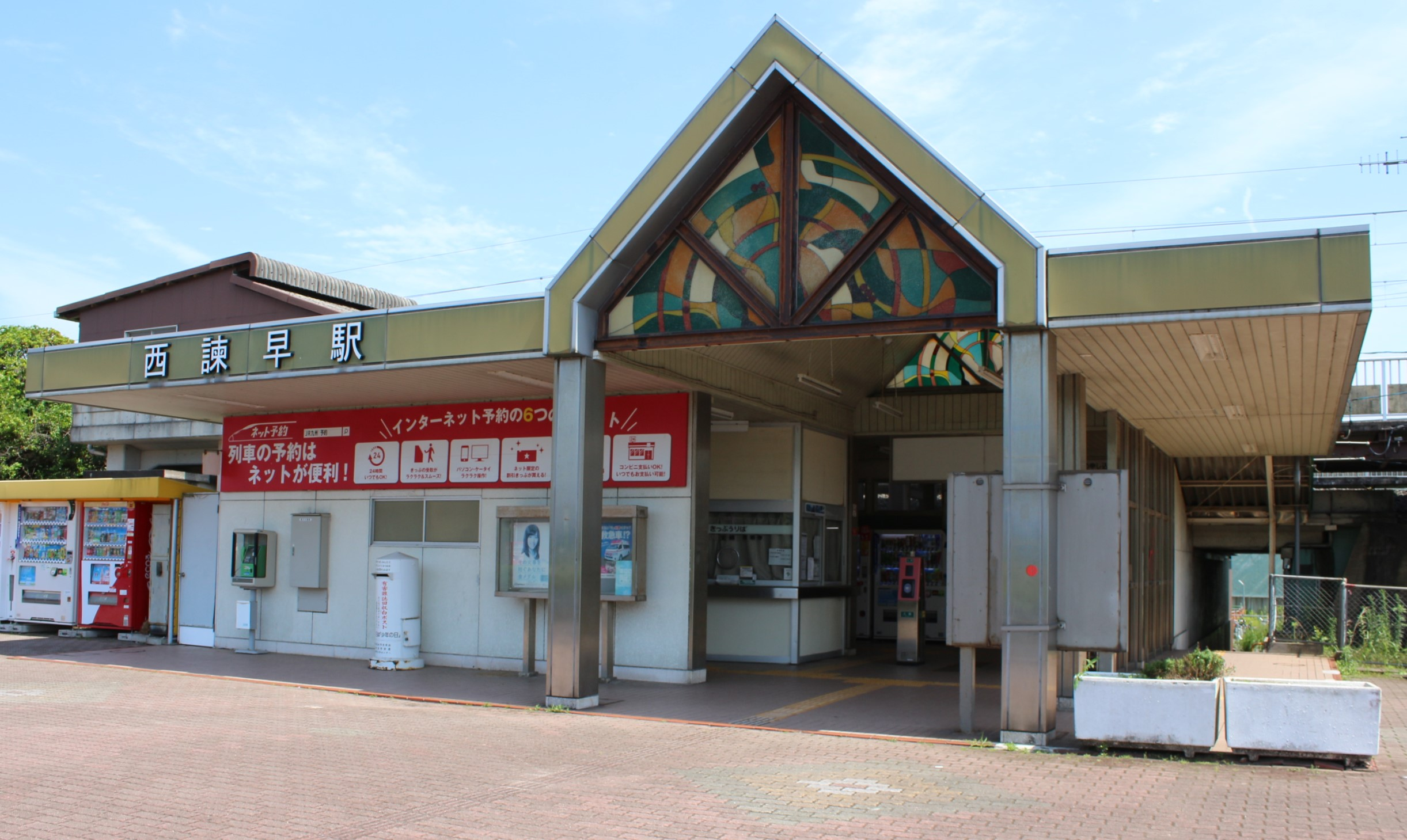
- Nishi-Isahaya Station in 2021

General information
- Location: Japan
- Coordinates: 32°50′22″N 130°01′17″E
- Operator: JR Kyushu
- Line: JH Nagasaki Main Line
- Distance: 103.2 km from Tosu
- Platforms: 2 side platforms
- Tracks: 2

Construction
- Structure type: Embankment

Other information
- Status: Staffed ticket window (outsourced)
- Website: Official website

History
- Opened: 14 March 1985

Passengers
- FY2020: 897 daily
- Rank: 147th (among JR Kyushu stations)

Services
Preceding station	JR Kyushu	Following station
Kikitsu towards Nagasaki	Nagasaki Line Local	Isahaya towards Tosu
Kikitsu towards Nagasaki	Nagasaki Line Seaside Liner	Isahaya towards Tosu
Location
- Location within Nagasaki Prefecture Location within Japan

Nishi-Isahaya Station (西諫早駅, Nishi-Isahaya-eki) is a passenger railway station located in the city of Isahaya, Nagasaki Prefecture, Japan. It is operated by JR Kyushu.

== Lines ==
The station is served by the Nagasaki Main Line and is located 103.2 km from the starting point of the line at Tosu. Besides the local services on the line, some trains of the JR Kyushu Rapid Seaside Liner service between Sasebo and Nagasaki also stop at the station.

== Station layout ==
The station consists of two side platforms serving two tracks on an embankment. The station building is at street level and is modern concrete structure with stained glass decorations on the gabled ends. It houses a waiting area and a ticket window. After the ticket gates, an underpass and steps give access to both platforms.

Management of the station has been outsourced to the JR Kyushu Tetsudou Eigyou Co., a wholly owned subsidiary of JR Kyushu specialising in station services. It staffs the ticket window which is equipped with a POS machine but does not have a Midori no Madoguchi facility.

=== Platforms ===
1	■ JH Nagasaki Main Line	for Isahaya, Saga and Tosu
2	■ JH Nagasaki Main Line	for Nagasaki

== History ==
Japanese National Railways (JNR) opened the station on 14 March 1985 as an additional station on the existing track of the Nagasaki Main Line. With the privatization of JNR on 1 April 1987, control of the station passed to JR Kyushu.

== Passenger statistics ==
In fiscal 2020, the station was used by an average of 897 passengers daily (boarding passengers only), and it ranked 147th among the busiest stations of JR Kyushu.

== Surrounding area ==
- Nagasaki Nihon University Junior and Senior High School
- Isahaya City Nishi-Isahaya Junior High School

== See also ==
- List of railway stations in Japan
