= Kōda Station (Nagayo) =

Railway station in Nagayo, Nagasaki Prefecture, Japan

Kōda Station 高田駅
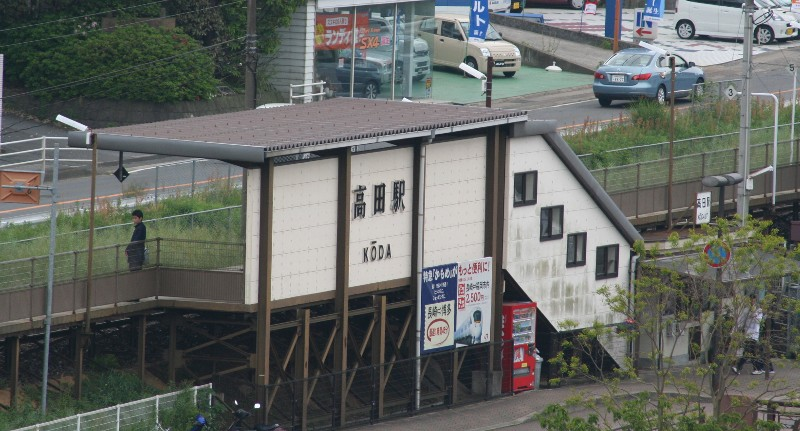
- Kōda Station in 2007

General information
- Location: 129-2 Kodago, Nagayo-cho, Nishisonogi-gun, Nagasaki-ken 851-2127; Japan
- Coordinates: 32°49′10″N 129°52′10″E
- Operator: JR Kyushu
- Line: JH Nagasaki Main Line
- Distance: 16.4 km from Kikitsu (starting point of branch)
- Platforms: 1 side platform
- Tracks: 1

Construction
- Structure type: Embankment
- Cycle facilities: Designated parking area for bikes
- Accessible: No - steps lead up to platform

Other information
- Status: Staffed ticket window (outsourced)
- Website: Official website

History
- Opened: 1 March 1994

Passengers
- FY2020: 478 daily
- Rank: 219th (among JR Kyushu stations)
Location
- Location within Nagasaki Prefecture Location within Japan

Kōda Station (高田駅, Kōda-eki) is a passenger railway station located in the town of Nagayo, Nishisonogi District, Nagasaki Prefecture, Japan. It is operated by JR Kyushu.

== Lines ==
The station is served by the old line or the Nagayo branch of the Nagasaki Main Line and is located 16.4 km from the branch point at Kikitsu. Only local trains run on this branch.

== Station layout ==
The station consists of a side platform serving a single track on an embankment. A small station building houses a staffed ticket window and waiting area at the base of the embankment from which a covered flight of steps leads to the platform where a shelter is provided for waiting passengers. The station is equipped with a SUGOCA card reader.

Management of the station has been outsourced to the JR Kyushu Tetsudou Eigyou Co., a wholly owned subsidiary of JR Kyushu specialising in station services. It staffs the ticket window which is equipped with a POS machine but does not have a Midori no Madoguchi facility.

== Adjacent stations ==
←	Service	→
Nagasaki Main Line (old line)
Nagayo	Local	Michinoo

== History ==
JR Kyushu opened the station on 1 March 1994 as an additional station on the existing track of the old or Nagayo branch of the Nagasaki Main Line.

== Passenger statistics ==
In fiscal 2020, the station was used by an average of 478 passengers daily (boarding passengers only), and it ranked 219th among the busiest stations of JR Kyushu.

== Surrounding area ==
- Nagayo Town Nagayo Minami Elementary School
- Nagasaki Prefectural Hokuyōdai High School - 5 Minutes on foot
- Nagasaki Prefectural Road Route 33
