= Koga Station =

Koga Station is the name of two train stations in Japan:

- Koga Station (Ibaraki) (古河駅)
- Koga Station (Fukuoka) (古賀駅)

== See also ==
- Hizen-Koga Station, on the Nagasaki Main Line in Nagasaki City
