= Ichinuno Station =

Railway station in Isahaya, Nagasaki Prefecture, Japan

Ichinuno Station 市布駅
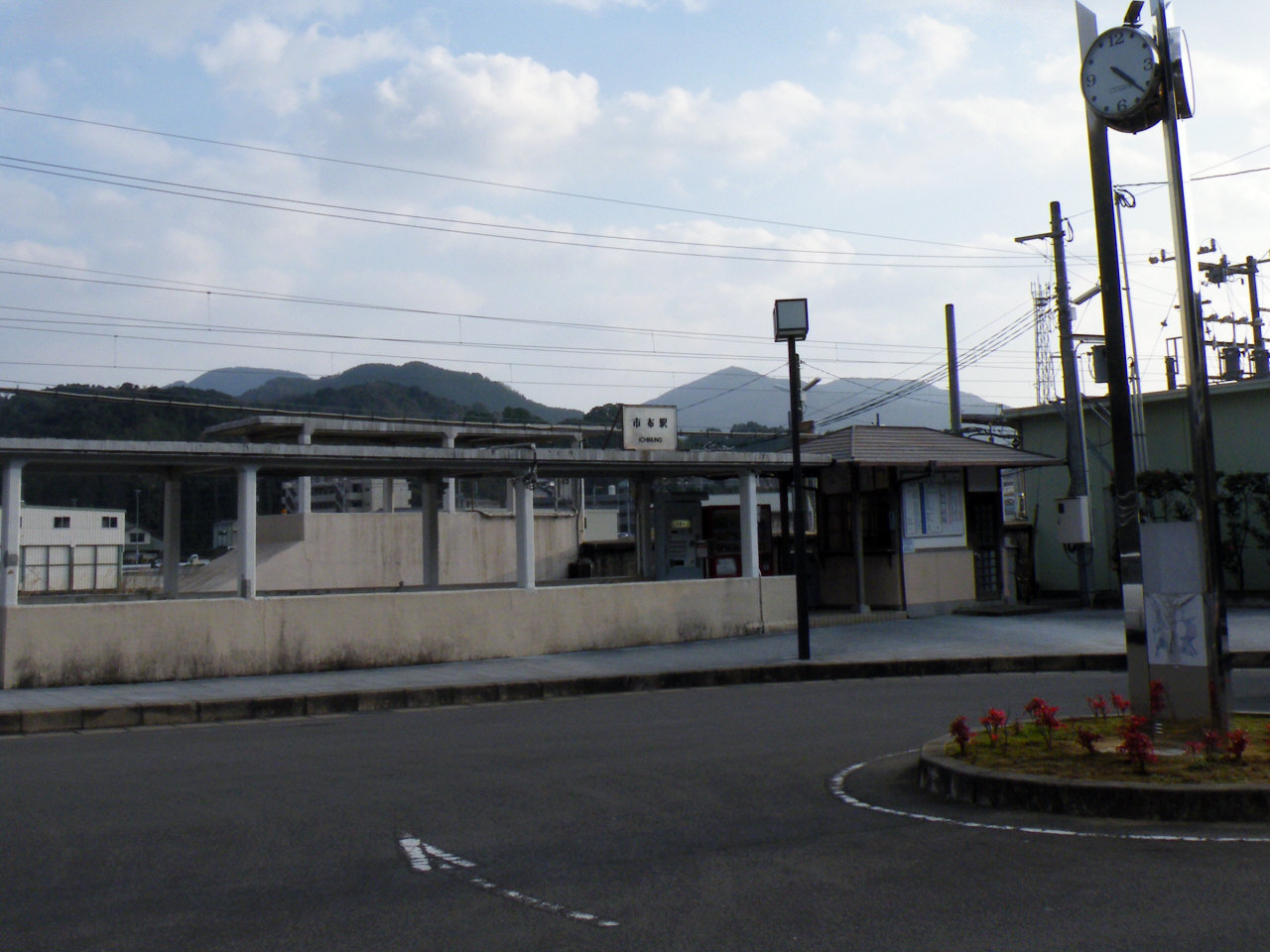
- Ichinuno Station in 2009

General information
- Location: Taramicho Ichinuno, Isahaya-shi, Nagasaki-ken 859-0403; Japan
- Coordinates: 32°49′11″N 129°58′00″E
- Operator: JR Kyushu
- Line: JH Nagasaki Main Line
- Distance: 109.4 km from Tosu
- Platforms: 1 island platform
- Tracks: 2

Construction
- Structure type: At grade
- Accessible: No - underpass with steps to platform

Other information
- Status: Unstaffed
- Website: Official website

History
- Opened: 2 October 1972

Passengers
- 289 daily
- Rank: 147th (among JR Kyushu stations)

Services
Preceding station	JR Kyushu	Following station
Hizen-Koga towards Nagasaki	Nagasaki Line Local	Kikitsu towards Tosu
Hizen-Koga towards Nagasaki	Nagasaki Line Seaside Liner (some)	Kikitsu towards Tosu
Location
- Location within Nagasaki Prefecture Location within Japan

Ichinuno Station (市布駅, Ichinuno-eki) is a passenger railway station located in the city of Isahaya, Nagasaki Prefecture, Japan. It is operated by JR Kyushu.

== Lines ==
The station is served by the Nagasaki Main Line and is located 109.4 km from the starting point of the line at Tosu. Besides local trains on the line, some trains of the Rapid Seaside Liner service between Sasebo and Nagasaki also stop at the station.

== Station layout ==
The station consists of an island platform serving two tracks at grade. The station structure is no more than a roof for steps down to an underpass leading to the island platform. A ticket window is integrated into the structure but is however unstaffed.

=== Platforms ===
1, 2	■ JH Nagasaki Main Line	for Isahaya, Saga and Tosu for Nagasaki

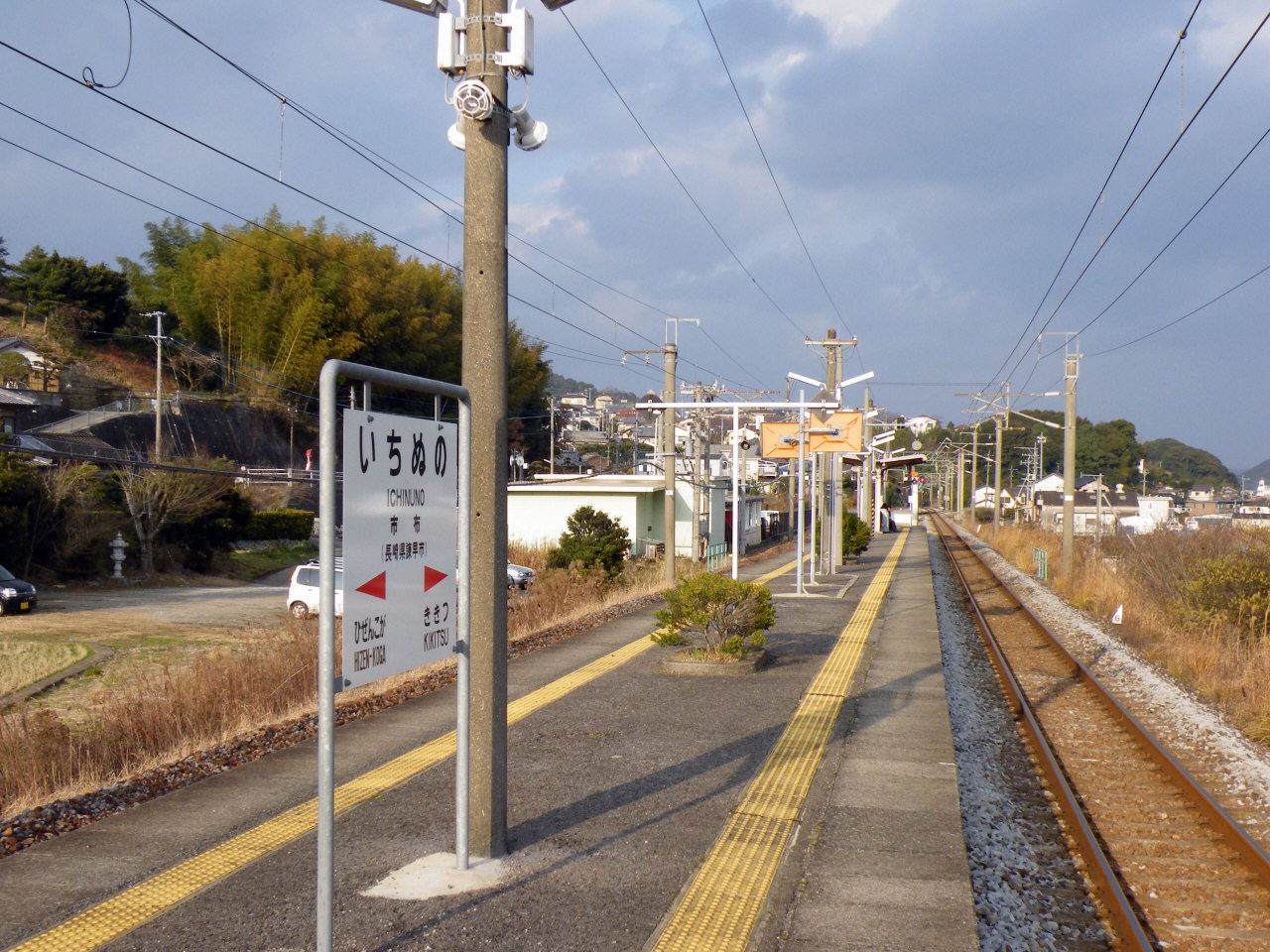
A view of the island platform and tracks, looking in the direction of Kikitsu.

== History ==
On 2 October 1972, Japanese National Railways (JNR) opened a new, shorter, inland route for the Nagasaki Main Line between Kikitsu and Urakami, thus bypassing the longer coastal route via Nagayo. Ichinuno was opened on the same day as one of the intermediate stations along this new route. With the privatization of JNR on 1 April 1987, control of the station passed to JR Kyushu.

== Passenger statistics ==
In fiscal 2014, there were a total of 105,307 boarding passengers, giving a daily average of 289 passengers.

== Environs ==
- National Route 34
- Nagasaki Expressway, Nagasaki Bypass: Nagasaki-Tarami Interchange
- Nagasaki Bypass: Koga-Ichinuno Interchange
