= Nagayo Station =

Railway station in Nagayo, Nagasaki Prefecture, Japan

Nagayo Station 長与駅
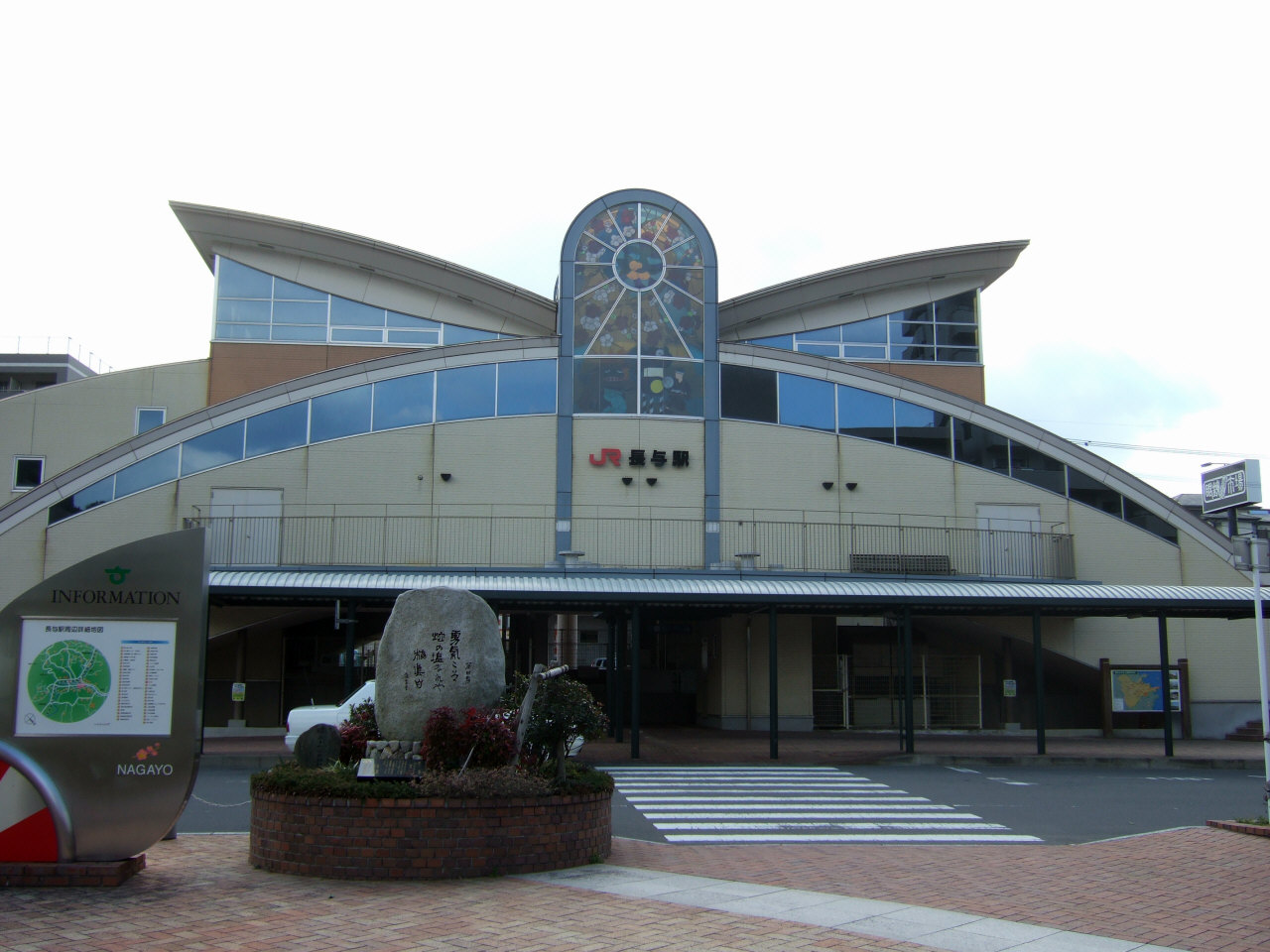
- Nagayo Station in 2008

General information
- Location: 275 Yoshimutago, Nagayo-cho, Nishisonogi-gun, Nagasaki-ken 851-2126; Japan
- Coordinates: 32°49′8″N 129°52′46″E
- Operator: JR Kyushu
- Line: JH Nagasaki Main Line
- Distance: 15.4 km from Kikitsu (starting point of branch)
- Platforms: 2 side platforms
- Tracks: 2 + 1 siding

Construction
- Structure type: At grade (cutting)

Other information
- Status: Staffed ticket window (Midori no Madoguchi) (outsourced)
- Website: Official website

History
- Opened: 22 July 1897

Passengers
- FY2019: 1,917 daily
- Rank: 95h (among JR Kyushu stations)
Location
- Location within Nagasaki Prefecture Location within Japan

Nagayo Station (長与駅, Nagayo-eki) is a passenger railway station located in the town of Nagayo, Nishisonogi District, Nagasaki Prefecture, Japan. It is operated by JR Kyushu.

== Lines ==
The station is served by the old line or the Nagayo branch of the Nagasaki Main Line and is located 15.4 km from the branch point at Kikitsu. Only local trains run on this branch.

== Station layout ==
The station consists of two side platforms serving two tracks with a siding branching off track 1. The station building isa hashigami structure where the station facilities such as a waiting area, ticket window and ticket gates are placed on a bridge which spans the tracks. After the ticket gates, flights of steps connect to the platforms.

Management of the station has been outsourced to the JR Kyushu Tetsudou Eigyou Co., a wholly owned subsidiary of JR Kyushu specialising in station services. It staffs the ticket window which is equipped with a Midori no Madoguchi facility.

=== Platforms ===
1	■ JH Nagasaki Main Line	for Isahaya, Saga and Tosu
2	■ JH Nagasaki Main Line	for Nagasaki

== Adjacent stations ==
←	Service	→
Nagasaki Main Line (old line)
Honkawachi	Local	Kōda

== History ==
The private Kyushu Railway, had opened a track from Tosu to Saga by 5 May 1895, and thereafter expanding southwards in phases, as part of the construction of a line to Nagasaki. Separately, a track was laid from Urakami (then known as Nagasaki) north to Nagayo, which opened on 22 July 1897 as the terminus. On 27 November 1898, Nagayo became a through-station when a link up was made with the track from Tosu which had expanded south to Ōmura. When the Kyushu Railway was nationalized on 1 July 1907, Japanese Government Railways (JGR) took over control of the station. On 12 October 1909, track from Tosu through Haiki, Ōmura, Nagayo to Nagasaki was designated the Nagasaki Main Line. On 2 October 1972, a shorter inland bypass route was opened between Kikitsu through Ichinuno to Urakami was opened, which became known as the new line or Ichinuno branch of the Nagasaki Main Line. The section serving Nagayo became known as the old line or the Nagayo branch. With the privatization of Japanese National Railways (JNR), the successor of JGR, on 1 April 1987, control of the station passed to JR Kyushu.

== Passenger statistics ==
In fiscal 2019, the station was used by an average of 1917 passengers daily (boarding passengers only), and it ranked 95th among the busiest stations of JR Kyushu.

== Surrounding area ==
- Nagayo Station Community Hall

=== East Exit (Park Exit) ===
- Yoshimuta Park
- Nagayo Town Hall
- Nakao-jō Park
  - Nagayo-chōmin Culture Hall (長与町民文化ホール)
  - Ceramics Hall (陶芸の館)

=== West Exit (University Exit) ===
- Nagasaki Prefectural Route 33
- Nagayo Daini Junior High School
- Siebold University of Nagasaki

== See also ==
- List of railway stations in Japan
