= Urakami Station =

Railway station in Nagasaki, Nagasaki Prefecture, Japan

Coordinates: 32°45′56″N 129°51′48″E

Urakami Station 浦上駅
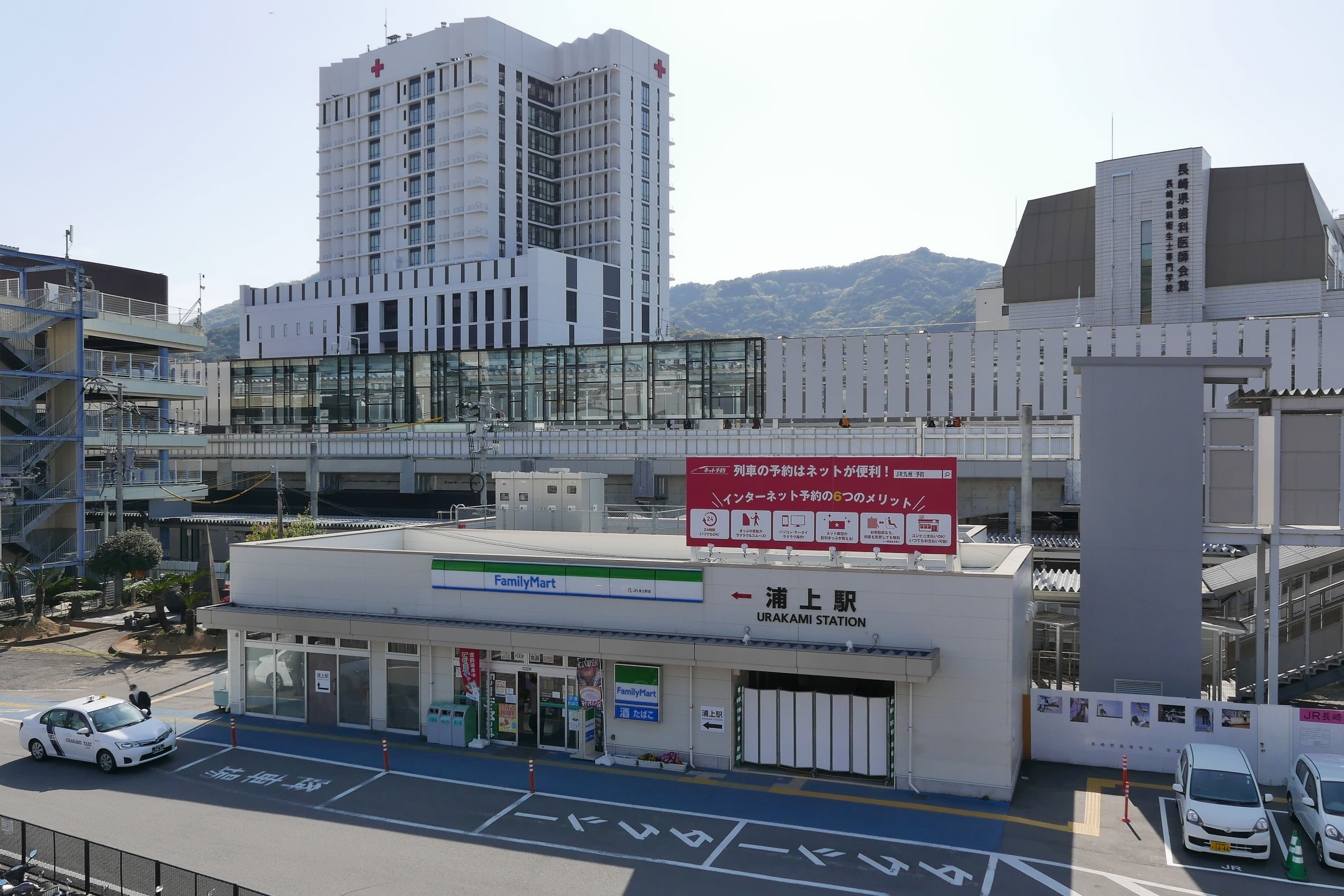
- The temporary Urakami Station building with the elevated platforms in the background in April, 2020.

General information
- Location: Kawaguchi-machi, Nagasaki, Nagasaki （長崎県長崎市川口町） Japan
- Operator: JR Kyushu
- Line: Nagasaki Main Line

History
- Opened: 1897
- Former names: Nagasaki (until 1905)

Passengers
- 2005: 3,801 daily
Location

Urakami Station (浦上駅, Urakami-eki) is a railway station in Kawaguchi-chō, Nagasaki, Nagasaki Prefecture, Japan. It is operated by JR Kyushu and is on the Nagasaki Main Line. It is the station where the old line and new line sections of the Nagasaki Line intersect. In front of the station is the Urakami Ekimae stop on the Nagasaki Electric Tramway.

== Layout ==
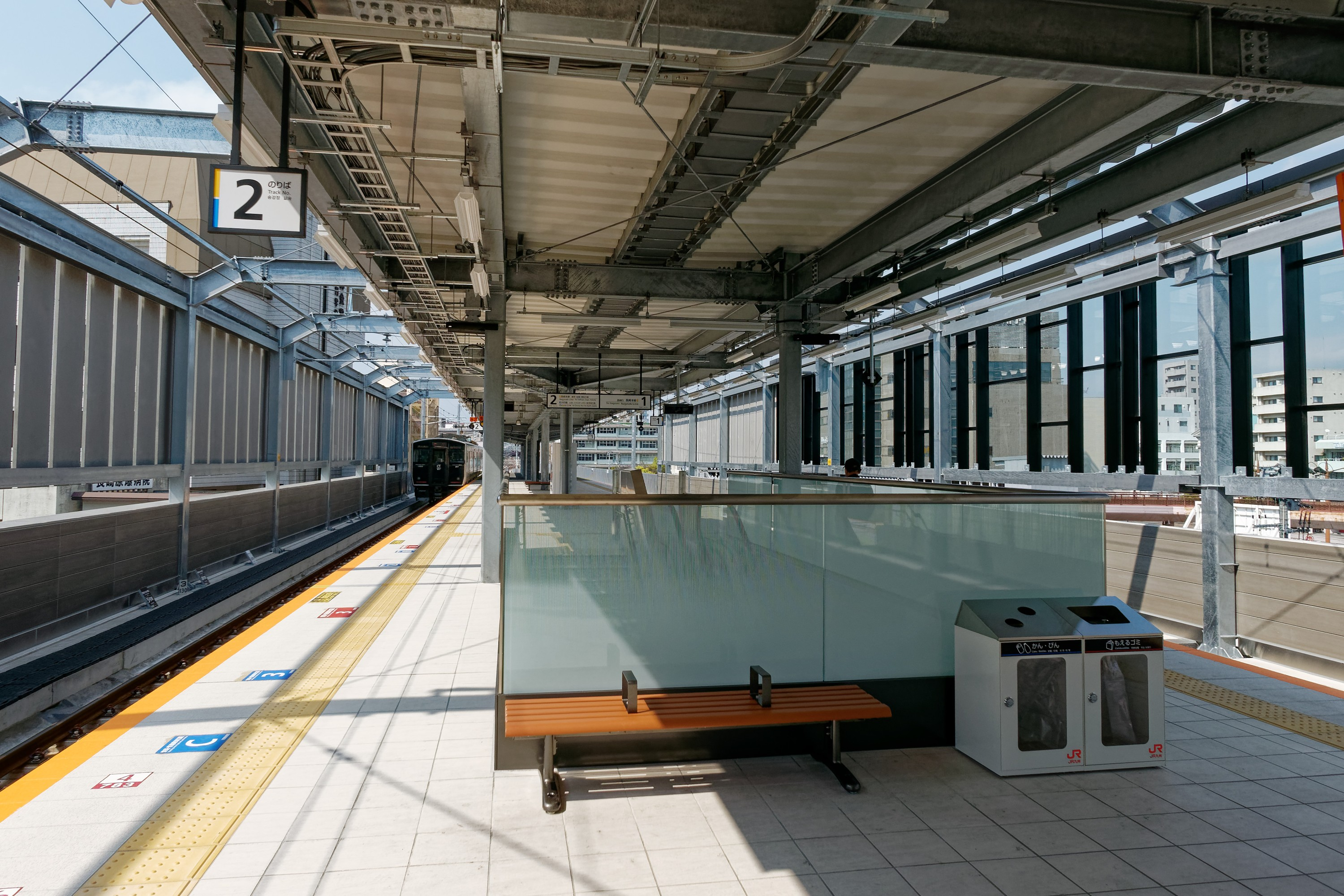
Station platforms

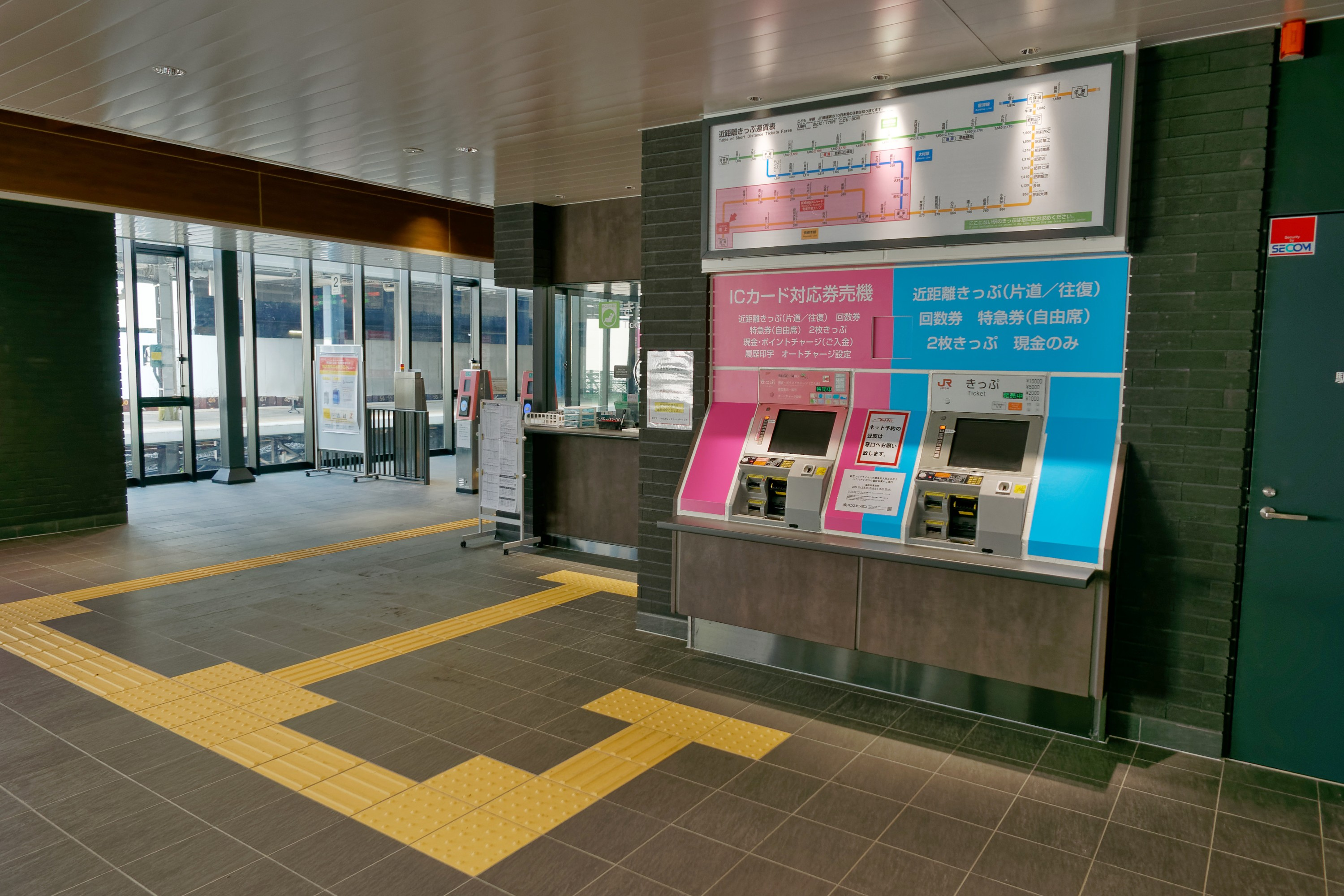
Ticket office and ticketing area

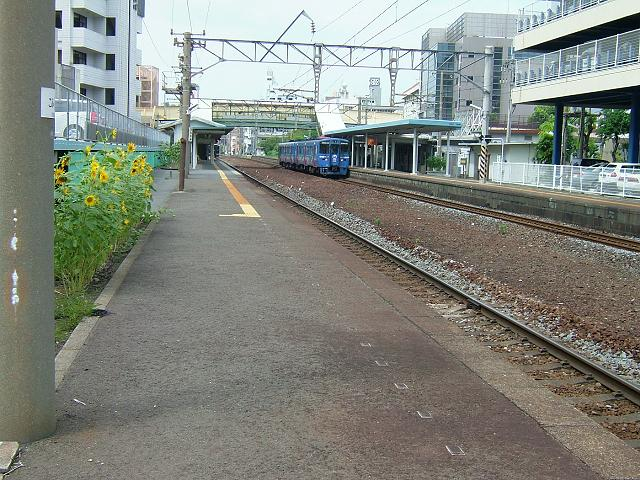
Station platforms prior to elevation of the station

Urakami Station has a single elevated island platform servicing two tracks. The station entrance and ticketing area are located on the ground level with the platforms on the upper level. There are two automatic ticket machines, a Midori no Madoguchi ticket office and two SUGOCA card readers instead of automatic ticket gates.

Tracks
| 1 | ■Express Seaside Liner ■Nagasaki Main Line | To Nagasaki |
| 2 | ■Express Seaside Liner | To Isahaya・Ōmura・Huis ten Bosch・Sasebo |
| 2 | ■Nagasaki Main Line (via Ichinuno) | To Isahaya・Yue・Kōhoku・Tosu |
| 2 | ■Nagasaki Main Line (via Nagayo)・Ōmura Line | To Isahaya・Ōmura・Huis ten Bosch・Sasebo |

== Surrounding area ==
In front of the station is the Urakami Ekimae stop of the Nagasaki Electric Tramway. Behind the station is a hospital, and nearby are condos, concert halls, broadcast stations and schools among other things. Many of the people who use this station are commuters to these places.

=== Educational facilities ===
- Kassui High School and Junior High School
- Nagasaki Nishi High School
- Fuchi Junior High School
- Zenza Elementary School
- Sakamoto Elementary School
- Kitakyushu Preparatory School
- Nagasaki University School of Medicine
- Nagasaki University School of Dentistry

=== Medical care ===
- Nagasaki University Hospital of Medicine and Dentistry
- Japanese Red Cross Nagasaki Atomic Bomb Hospital
- Nagasaki Prefecture Medical Association Hall

=== Cultural facilities ===
- Nagasaki National Peace Memorial Hall for the Atomic Bomb Victims
- Nagasaki Atomic Bomb Museum
- Nagasaki City Peace Hall
- Nagasaki City Museum of History and Folklore
- Nagasaki Brick Hall

=== Media ===
- Nagasaki Shimbun
- Nagasaki Cultural Telecasting Corporation

== Usage ==
On average 3,801 people use this station per day (2005 estimate).

== History ==
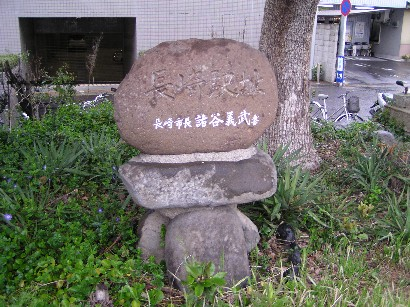
Stone monument noting that this was the site of the original Nagasaki Station.

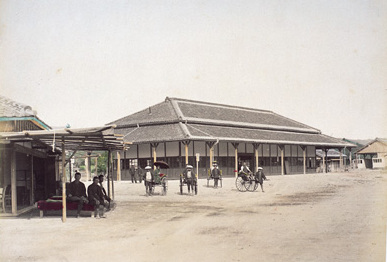
View of the old station circa 1899.

When this station first opened on July 22, 1897, it was called Nagasaki Station. Even today there is a stone monument in one corner of the station plaza which reads "The Site of Nagasaki Station" (「長崎駅址」). On August 9, 1945 the station was destroyed by the nuclear bomb dropped on Nagasaki.

The station was rebuilt as an elevated station and reopened on March 28, 2020. The elevation of Urakami Station, together with Nagasaki Station, which started in 2009 as a grade separation project to abolish busy level crossings, is completed in preparation for the Nishi Kyushu Shinkansen.

- 1897-07-22 - Opens for business as Nagasaki Station, the terminal station of the Nagasaki Line of Kyushu Railways.
- 1905-04-05 - The line extends and the station is renamed to Urakami Station.
- 1907-07-01 - The station becomes nationally run according to the nationalization of Kyushu Railways.
- 1909-10-12 - Japanese National Railways renames the line the Nagasaki Main Line (長崎本線).
- 1945-08-09 - Damaged by the atomic bombing.
- 1972-10-02 - The "new line" section of the Nagasaki Main Line opens and Urakami Station becomes a junction for the new and old sections of the line.
- 1976-06-06 - The track between Tosu Station and Nagasaki Station (Nagasaki) becomes electrified.
- 1987-04-01 - Japanese National Railways privatizes and JR Kyushu becomes the station's operator.
- 2013-12-14 - The existing station building is demolished and a temporary station building is built in preparation of station elevation.
- 2020-03-28 - The station is rebuilt and reopened as an elevated station.

== Adjacent stations ==
| ← | Service | → |
|---|---|---|
| Kikitsu | Nagasaki Main Line (Rapid Seaside Liner※) | Nagasaki |
| Utsutsugawa | Nagasaki Main Line ("new line" local service) | Nagasaki |
| Nishi-Urakami | Nagasaki Main Line ("old line" local service) | Nagasaki |

※Some trains are different in a station to stop.
