= Nagasaki Station =

Railway station in Nagasaki, Nagasaki Prefecture, Japan

Coordinates: 32°45′10″N 129°52′14″E

Nagasaki Station 長崎駅
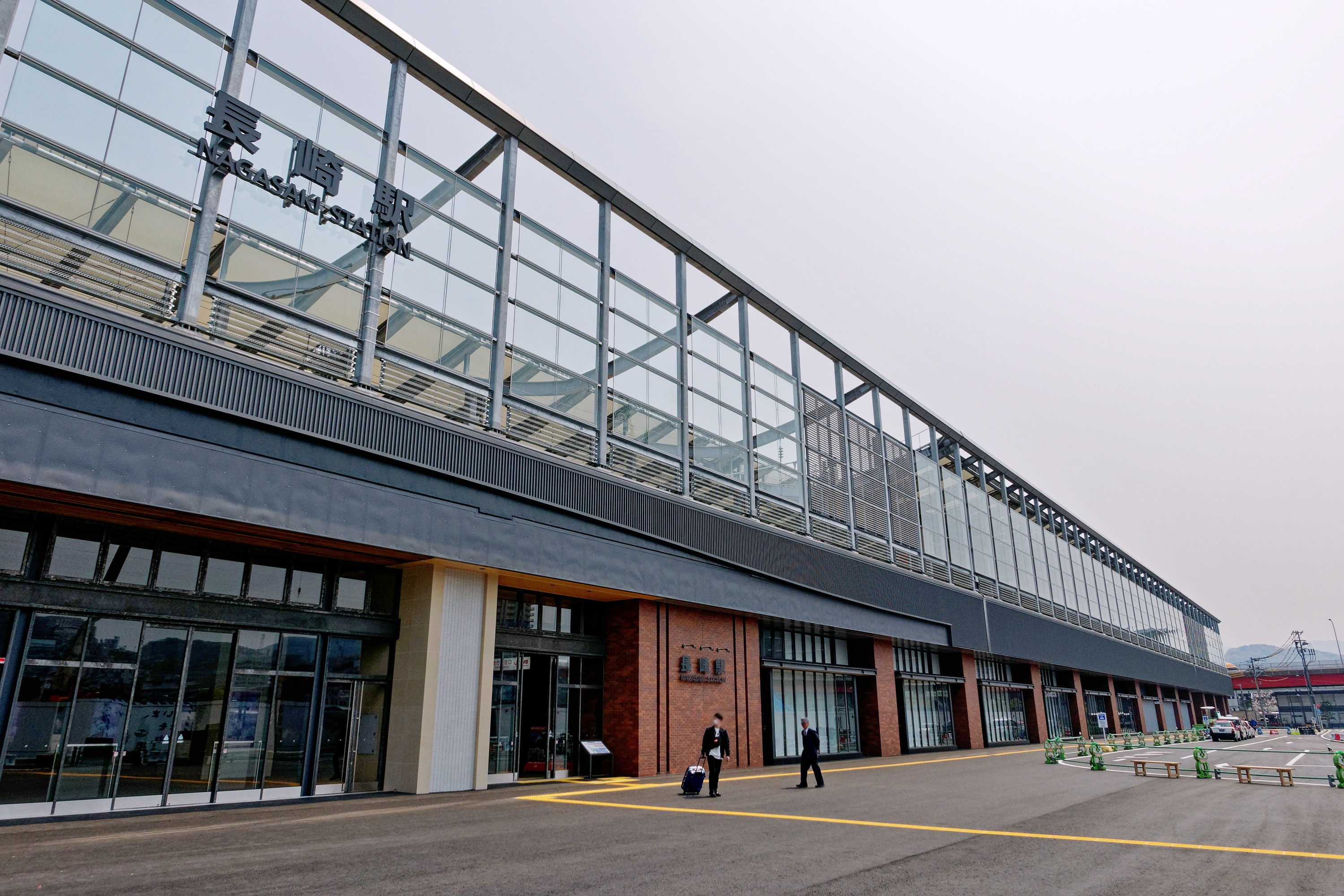
- The west entrance of Nagasaki Station in April 2020

General information
- Location: Onoue-machi; Nagasaki, Nagasaki; Japan
- Operator: JR Kyushu
- Lines: Nagasaki Main Line; Nishi Kyushu Shinkansen
- Distance: Nagasaki Main Line: 125.3 km (77.9 mi) from Tosu; Nishi Kyushu Shinkansen: 66 km (41 mi) from Takeo-Onsen
- Platforms: 4 island platforms, 1 bay platform
- Tracks: 9
- Connections: Nagasaki Electric Tramway

Construction
- Structure type: Elevated

History
- Opened: 5 April 1905; 121 years ago

Passengers
- FY2016: 10,650 daily
- Rank: 13th (among JR Kyushu stations)

Services
Preceding station	JR Kyushu	Following station
Terminus	Nishi Kyushu Shinkansen Kamome	Isahaya towards Takeo-Onsen
Terminus	Nagasaki Line	Urakami towards Tosu
Location
- Location within Nagasaki Prefecture Location within Japan

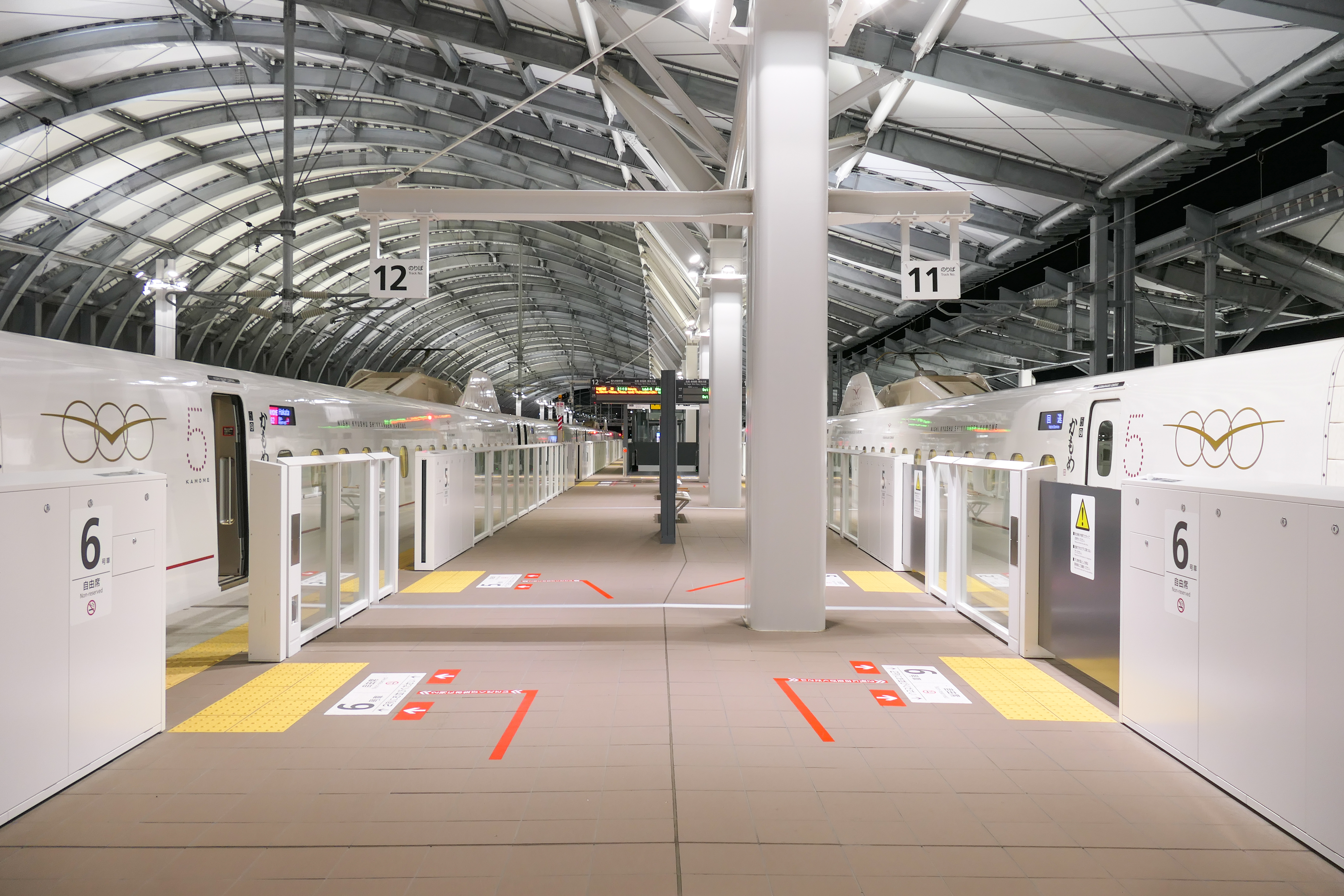
Platform 11 and 12 of JR Kyushu/Nagasaki Station (Shinkansen platform)

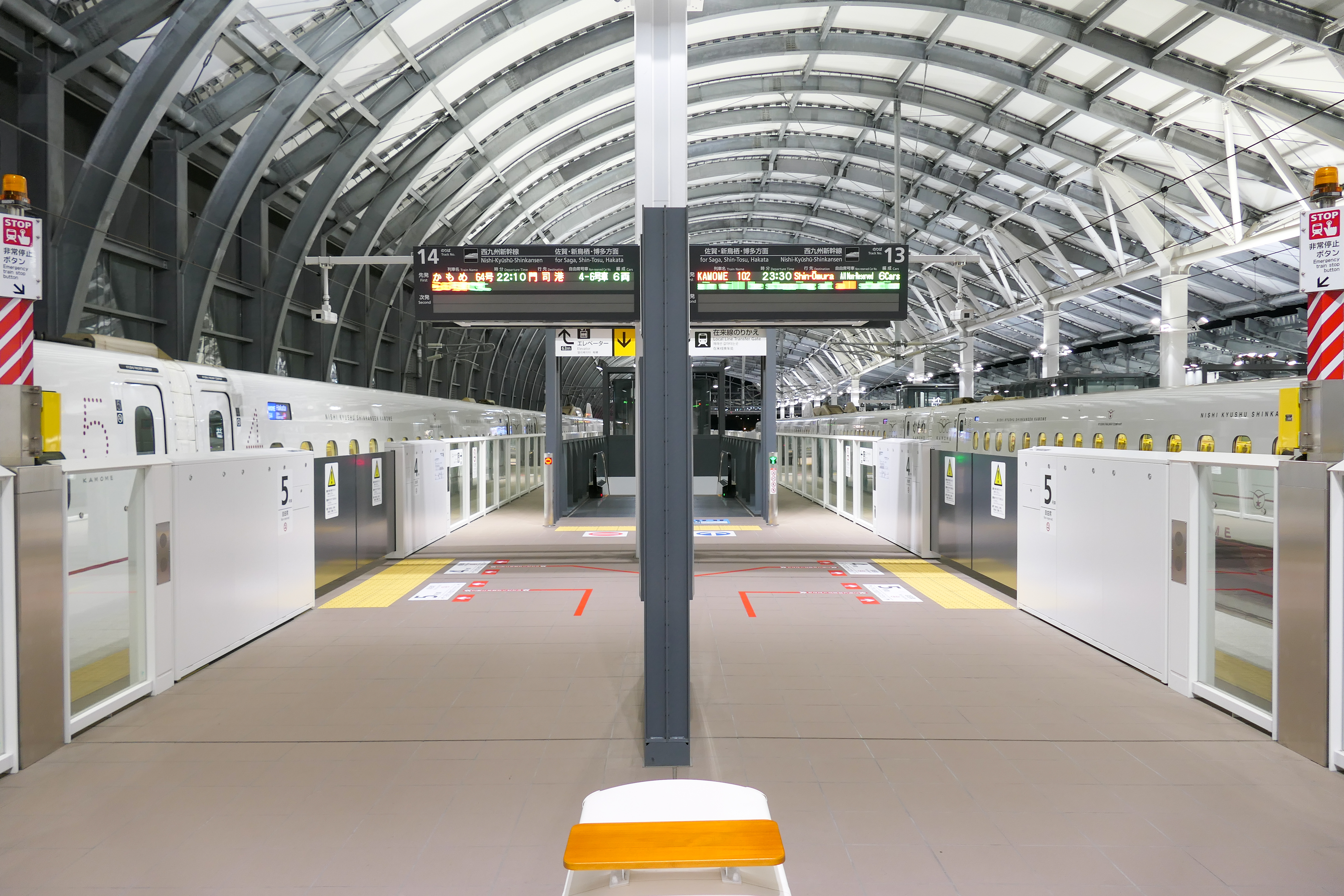
Platform 13 and 14 of JR Kyushu/Nagasaki Station (Shinkansen platform)

Nagasaki Station (Japanese: 長崎駅, Hepburn: Nagasaki-eki) is a railway station in Nagasaki, Nagasaki Prefecture, Japan, operated by the Kyushu Railway Company (JR Kyushu). It is the terminus of the Nishi Kyushu Shinkansen and the Nagasaki Main Line, as well as the westernmost high-speed Shinkansen railway station in Japan.

The station is connected by the Kamome Shinkansen service and the Relay Kamome limited express to Hakata, and by the Seaside Liner rapid service to Sasebo. Nagasaki Electric Tramway services call at a stop in front of the station.

== Lines ==
- Nishi Kyushu Shinkansen
- Nagasaki Main Line

== Station layout ==
The conventional line station has two elevated island platforms serving five tracks. The Shinkansen station has two island platforms serving four tracks.

=== Platforms ===
No.	Line Name	Direction	Notes
Conventional Lines
1‍–‍5	Nagasaki Line	for Isahaya・Ōmura・Huis Ten Bosch・Haiki・Sasebo	
1‍–‍5	Nagasaki Line	for Kikitsu・Isahaya・Kōhoku・Saga・Tosu	
Shinkansen
11‍–‍14	Nishi Kyushu Shinkansen	for Isahaya・Shin-Ōmura・Takeo-Onsen	Service to Hakata via Relay Kamome, cross-platform transfer at Takeo-Onsen

== History ==
Platforms of the old ground-level station in 2017, with a 885 series train

The station was opened on 5 April 1905 when the railway was extended from the former Nagasaki Station to the present station. The former station, opened in 1897, was renamed Urakami Station.

- 5 April 1905 - Opened by Kyushu Railway.
- 1 July 1907 - The railways are nationalized and the station becomes part of Japanese Government Railways.
- 12 October 1909 – Japanese National Railways (JNR) renames the line the Nagasaki Main Line (長崎本線).
- 9 August 1945 – Station damaged in the atomic bombing of the city.
- June 1969 – The elevated station is completed.
- 6 June 1976 – The track between Tosu and Nagasaki is electrified.
- 1 April 1987 – JNR is privatized and the station is inherited by JR Kyushu.
- 28 March 2020 - The station is rebuilt and is opened as a fully elevated station in preparation for the Nishi Kyushu Shinkansen.
- 23 September 2022 - The station is serviced by the Nishi Kyushu Shinkansen with new Shinkansen platforms.

== Surrounding area ==
- Nagasaki Electric Tramway Nagasaki-Ekimae tram stop
- Nagasaki Ken-ei Bus Terminal
- JR Kyushu Nagasaki Railway Division Nagasaki transportation center
- National Route 202
- Amu Plaza Nagasaki
- Nagasaki Marriott
- Hilton Nagasaki
- JR Kyushu Hotel Nagasaki
- Hotel New Nagasaki
- Nishi Kyushu Daiichi Hotel
- Twenty-six Martyrs of Japan
- NHK Nagasaki Broadcasting Station
- Nagasaki Chūō Post Office

== Passenger statistics ==
In fiscal 2016, the station was used by an average of 10,650 passengers daily (boarding passengers only), and it ranked 13th among the busiest stations of JR Kyushu.
