= Kikitsu Station =

Railway station in Isahaya, Nagasaki Prefecture, Japan

Kikitsu Station 喜々津駅
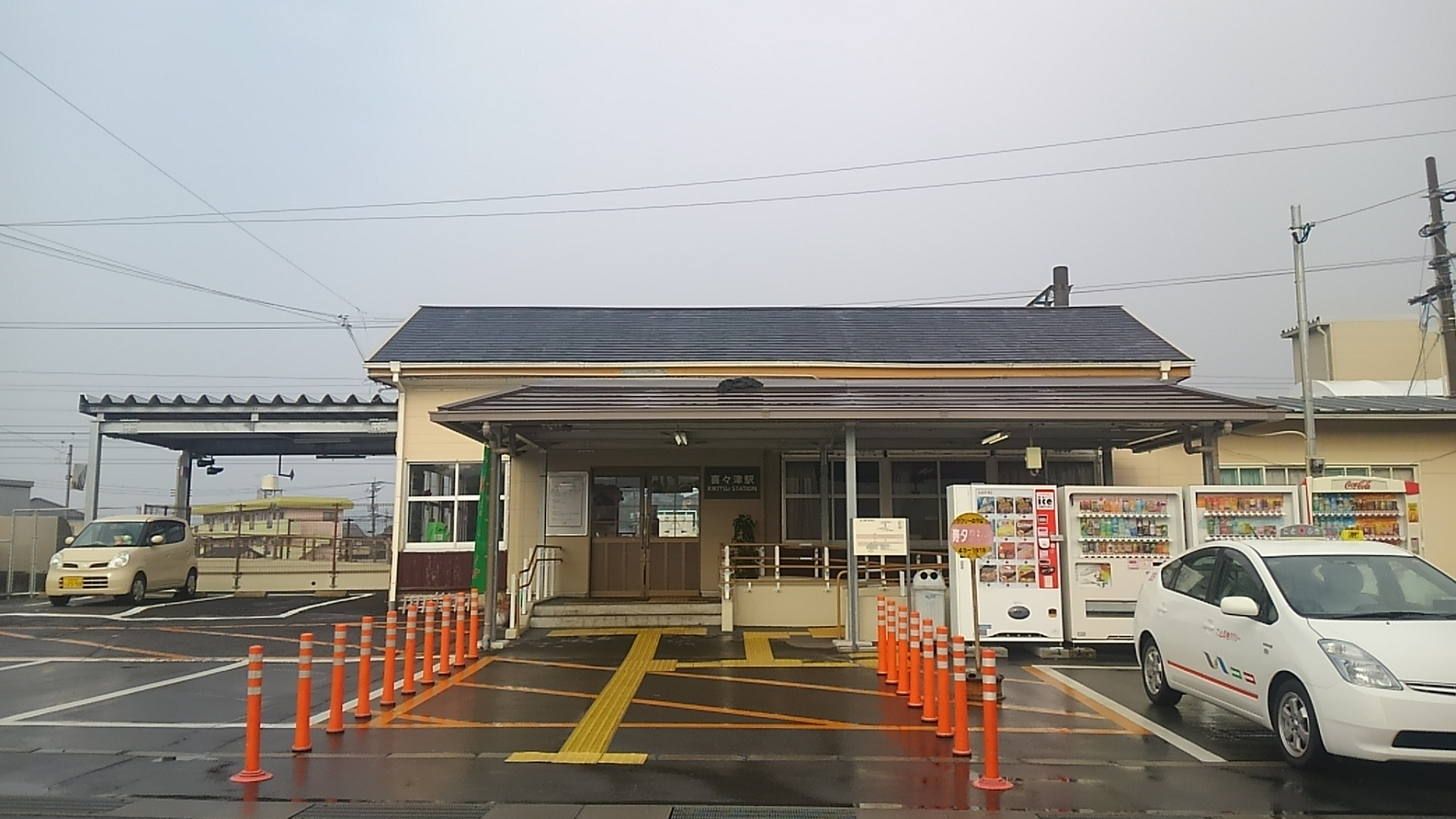
- Kikitsu Station in 2015

General information
- Location: Tarami-chō, Isahaya-shi, Nagasaki-ken 859-0401; Japan
- Coordinates: 32°49′57″N 129°59′10″E
- Operator: JR Kyushu
- Line: JH Nagasaki Main Line
- Distance: 106.9 km from Tosu
- Platforms: 1 side + 1 island platforms
- Tracks: 3 + 1 siding

Construction
- Structure type: At grade
- Accessible: Yes - footbridge served by elevators

Other information
- Status: Staffed ticket window (Midori no Madoguchi) (outsourced)
- Website: Official website

History
- Opened: 27 November 1898

Passengers
- FY2020: 1499 daily
- Rank: 99th (among JR Kyushu stations)

Services
Preceding station	JR Kyushu	Following station
Ichinuno towards Nagasaki	Nagasaki Line Local	Nishi-Isahaya towards Tosu
Higashisono towards Nagasaki	Nagasaki Line old line	Nishi-Isahaya towards Tosu
Urakami towards Nagasaki	Nagasaki Line Seaside Liner	Nishi-Isahaya towards Tosu
Location
- Location within Nagasaki Prefecture Location within Japan

Kikitsu Station (喜々津駅, Kikitsu-eki) is a passenger railway station located in the city of Isahaya, Nagasaki Prefecture, Japan. It is operated by JR Kyushu. From here, in the direction of Nagasaki, Nagasaki Main Line splits into the "new line" (inland route via Ichinuno) and the "old line" (coastal route via Nagayo).

== Lines ==
The station is served by the Nagasaki Main Line and is located 106.9 km from the starting point of the line at Tosu. Besides the local services on the line, the JR Kyushu Rapid Seaside Liner service between Sasebo and Nagasaki also stops at the station.

== Station layout ==
The station consists of a side platform and an island platform serving three tracks. The station building, a timber structure, houses a waiting area and a ticket window. Access to the opposite side platform is by a footbridge served by elevators.

Management of the station has been outsourced to the JR Kyushu Tetsudou Eigyou Co., a wholly owned subsidiary of JR Kyushu specialising in station services. It staffs the ticket window which is equipped with a Midori no Madoguchi facility.

=== Platforms ===
1	■ JH Nagasaki Main Line	for Nagasaki
2	■ JH Nagasaki Main Line	spare platform
3	■ JH Nagasaki Main Line	for Isahaya, Saga and Tosu

== History ==
The private Kyushu Railway, had opened a track from Tosu to Saga by 5 May 1895, and thereafter expanding southwards in phases, as part of the construction of a line to Nagasaki. Separately, a track was laid from Urakami (then known as Nagasaki) north to Nagayo, which opened on 22 July 1897. On 27 November 1898, a linkup was made between Nagayo and the track from Tosu which had reached southwards to Ōmura. Kikitsu was opened on the same day as an intermediate station along the new track. When the Kyushu Railway was nationalized on 1 July 1907, Japanese Government Railways (JGR) took over control of the station. On 12 October 1909, track from Tosu through Haiki, Ōmura, Kikitsu, Nagayo to Nagasaki was designated the Nagasaki Main Line. On 2 October 1972, Kikitsu became a junction station when a shorter inland bypass route was opened between Kikitsu through Ichinuno to Urakami. This became known as the new line or Ichinuno branch of the Nagasaki Main Line. The section to Nagayo became known as the old line or the Nagayo branch. With the privatization of Japanese National Railways (JNR), the successor of JGR, on 1 April 1987, control of the station passed to JR Kyushu.

== Passenger statistics ==
In fiscal 2020, the station was used by an average of 1499 passengers daily (boarding passengers only), and it ranked 99th among the busiest stations of JR Kyushu.

== Surrounding area ==
- Isahaya City Office Tarami Branch (Former Tarami Town Office)
- Tarami Post Office
- Seiryo High School
- Soseikan High School and Junior High School

== See also ==
- List of railway stations in Japan
