= Tosu Station =

Railway station in Tosu, Saga Prefecture, Japan

JB 15 JH 01 Tosu Station 鳥栖駅
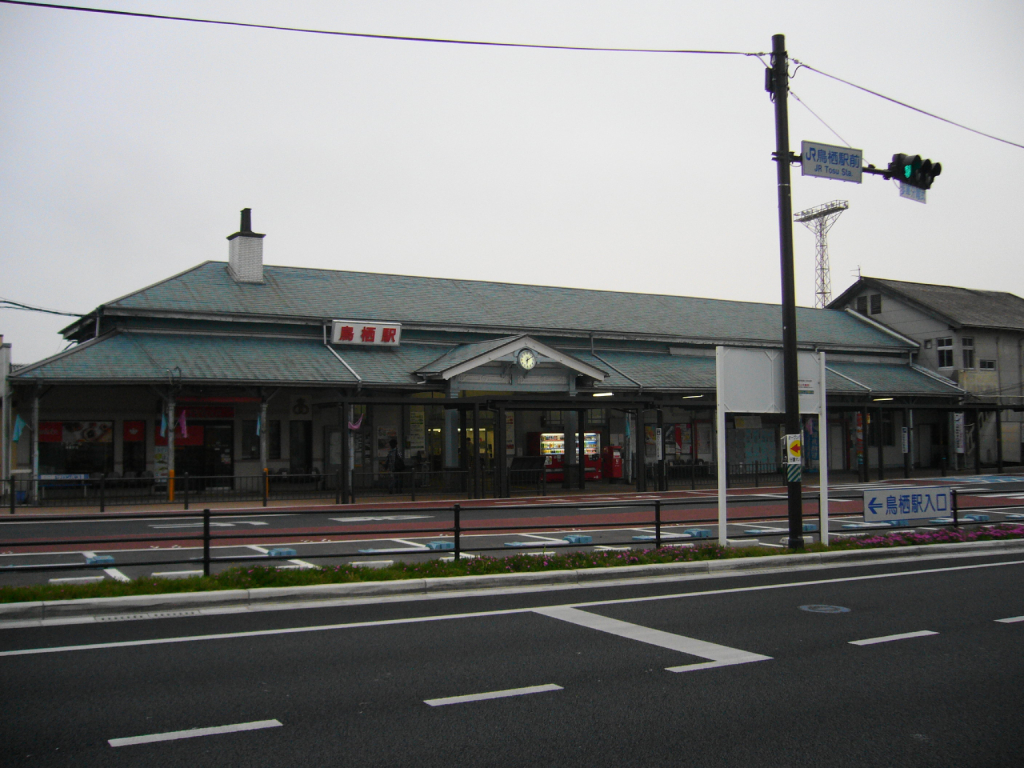
- Tosu Station

General information
- Location: Kyomachi, Tosu-shi, Saga-ken; Japan
- Coordinates: 33°22′25″N 130°31′9″E
- Operator: JR Kyushu
- Lines: JB Kagoshima Main Line; JH Nagasaki Line
- Distance: 106.8 km (66.4 mi) from Mojikō (Kagoshima Main Line); 0.0 km (starting point of the Nagasaki Main Line)
- Platforms: 3 island platforms
- Tracks: 6 + 6 passing loops
- Connections: Bus stop

Construction
- Structure type: At grade
- Parking: Available
- Accessible: Yes - underpass to platforms served by elevators

Other information
- Status: Staffed ticket window (Midori no Madoguchi)
- Station code: JB15; JH01
- Website: Official website

History
- Opened: 11 December 1889; 136 years ago
- Rebuilt: July 1903

Passengers
- FY2022: 5,207 daily (boarding only)
- Rank: 26th (among JR Kyushu stations)

Services
Preceding station	JR Kyushu	Following station
Kurume JB 17 towards Kagoshima	Kagoshima Main Line Rapid Regional Rapid	Kiyama JB 12 towards Mojikō
Hizen-Asahi JB 16 towards Kagoshima	Kagoshima Main Line Regional Rapid Local	Tashiro JB 14 towards Mojikō
Shin-Tosu towards Takeo-Onsen	Relay Kamome	Hakata Terminus
Shin-Tosu towards Sasebo or Huis Ten Bosch	Midori and Huis Ten Bosch	Futsukaichi towards Hakata
Shin-Tosu JH 02 towards Nagasaki	Nagasaki Line Limited Express Local	Terminus
Location
- Location within Saga Prefecture Location within Kyushu Location within Japan

Tosu Station (Japanese: 鳥栖駅, Hepburn: Tosu-eki) is a junction passenger railway station located in the city of Tosu, Saga Prefecture, Japan. It is operated by JR Kyushu and is the junction between the Kagoshima Main Line and the Nagasaki Main Line.

== Lines ==
The station is served by the Kagoshima Main Line and is located 106.8 km from the starting point of the line at Mojikō. In addition, the station is the eastern terminus of the 125.3 kilometer Nagasaki Main Line to Nagasaki.

Besides the local trains of these lines, trains of the following limited express services also stop at the station:

- Huis Ten Bosch
- Relay Kamome
- Midori
- Yufu/Yufu DX/Yufuinnomori

== Station layout ==
The station consists of three island platforms serving six tracks at grade. Passing loops run between the island platforms and several more passing loops are located to the east, beyond platform 6. Access to the island platforms is by two underground passageways connecting them with the station building. One of the underpasses is served by elevators. A footbridge known as the Rainbow Bridge spans the station plazas to the east and the west of the tracks and is also served by elevators. The station building, is located on the west side of the tracks and houses shops, a waiting area a JR Kyushu ticket window (with Midori no Madoguchi facility) and a JR travel centre. Several udon/soba stands are located in the station, including one on each of the island platforms. A JGR Class 230 steam locomotive (No.268) is on display on the east side of the station.

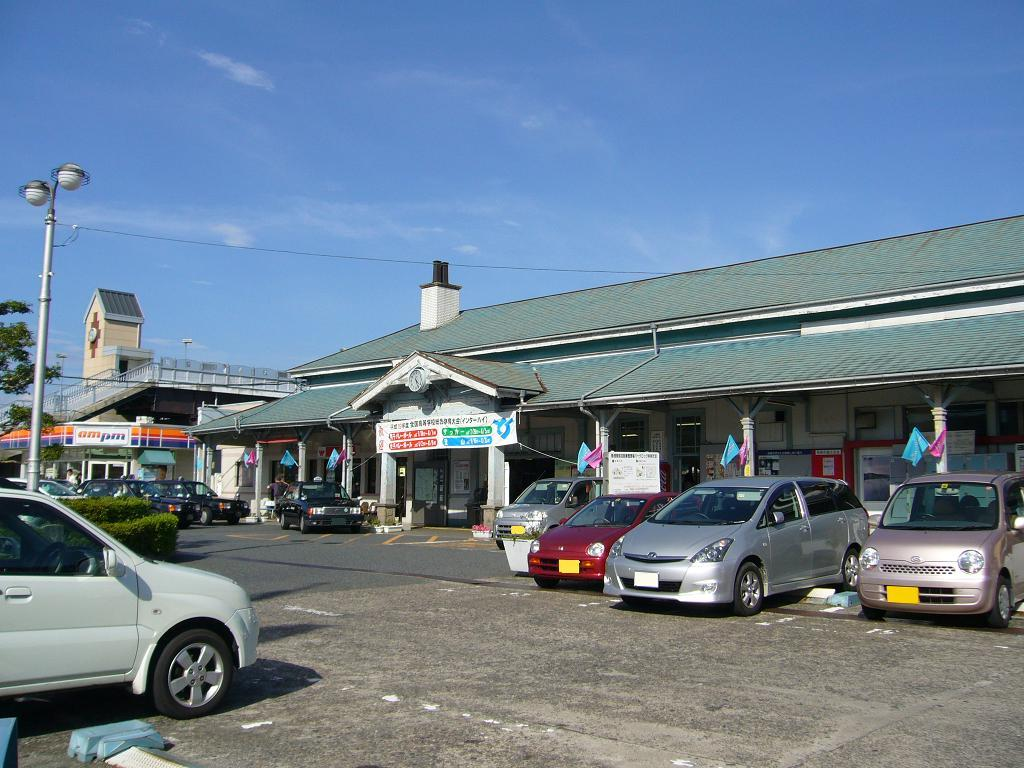
A view of the station entrance looking north. The structure with the pointed tower is the Rainbow Bridge.

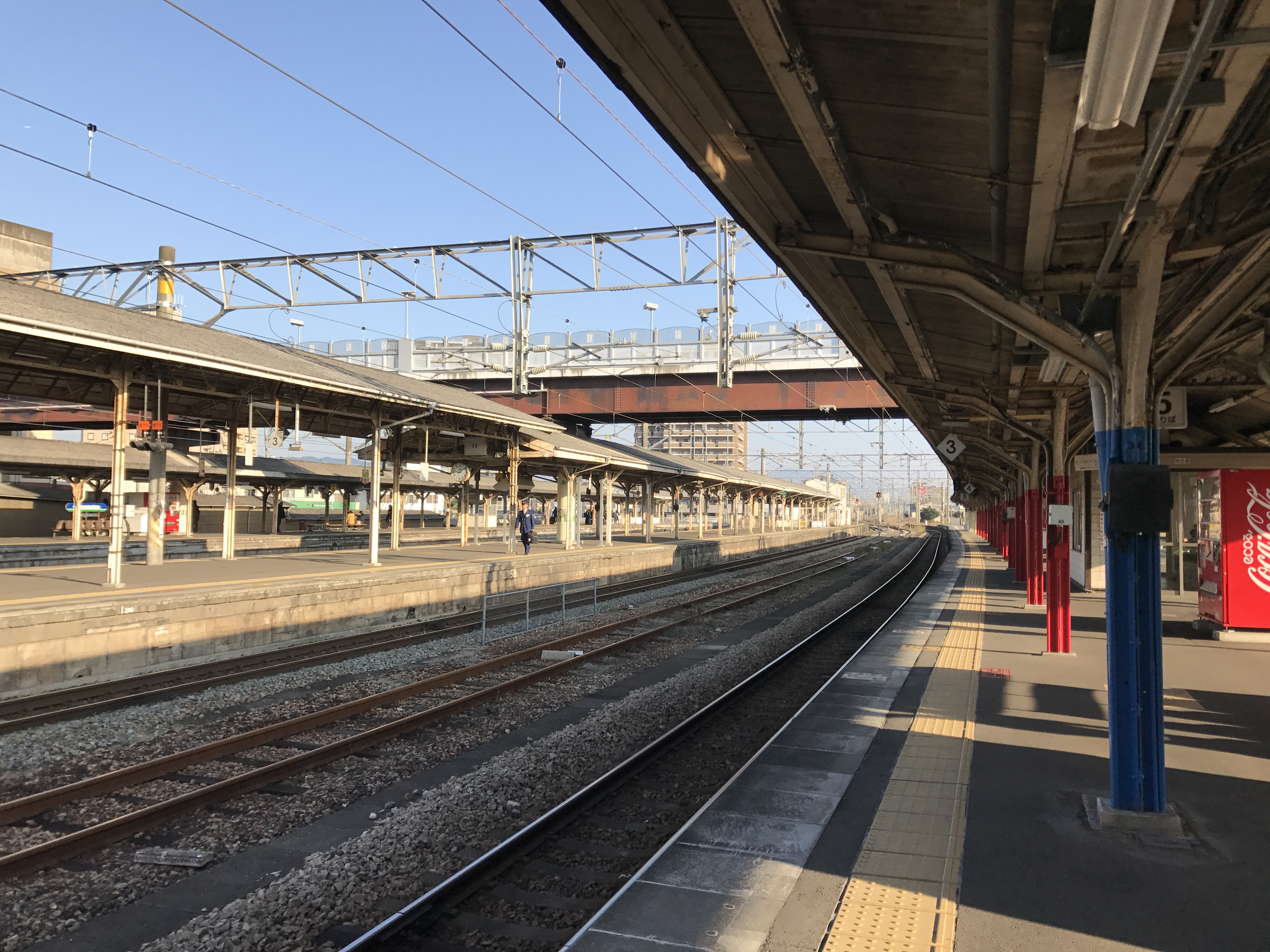
A view of platforms 4 and 5. Note the passing loop in between. The bridge above is the Rainbow Bridge.

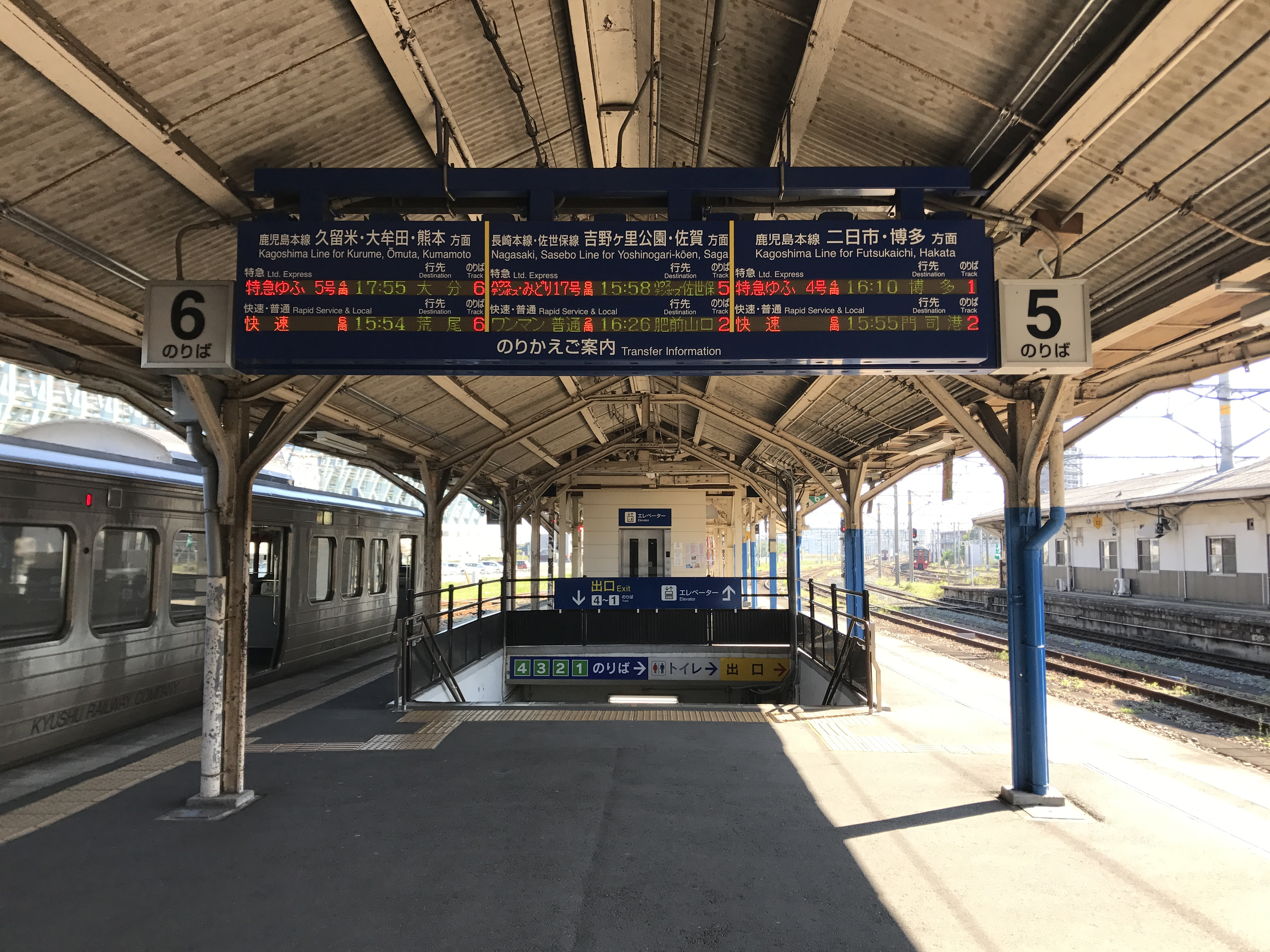
Stairs and elevator shaft to the underpass. The shelter columns are repurposed rails made in Germany and England from 1896 to 1897.

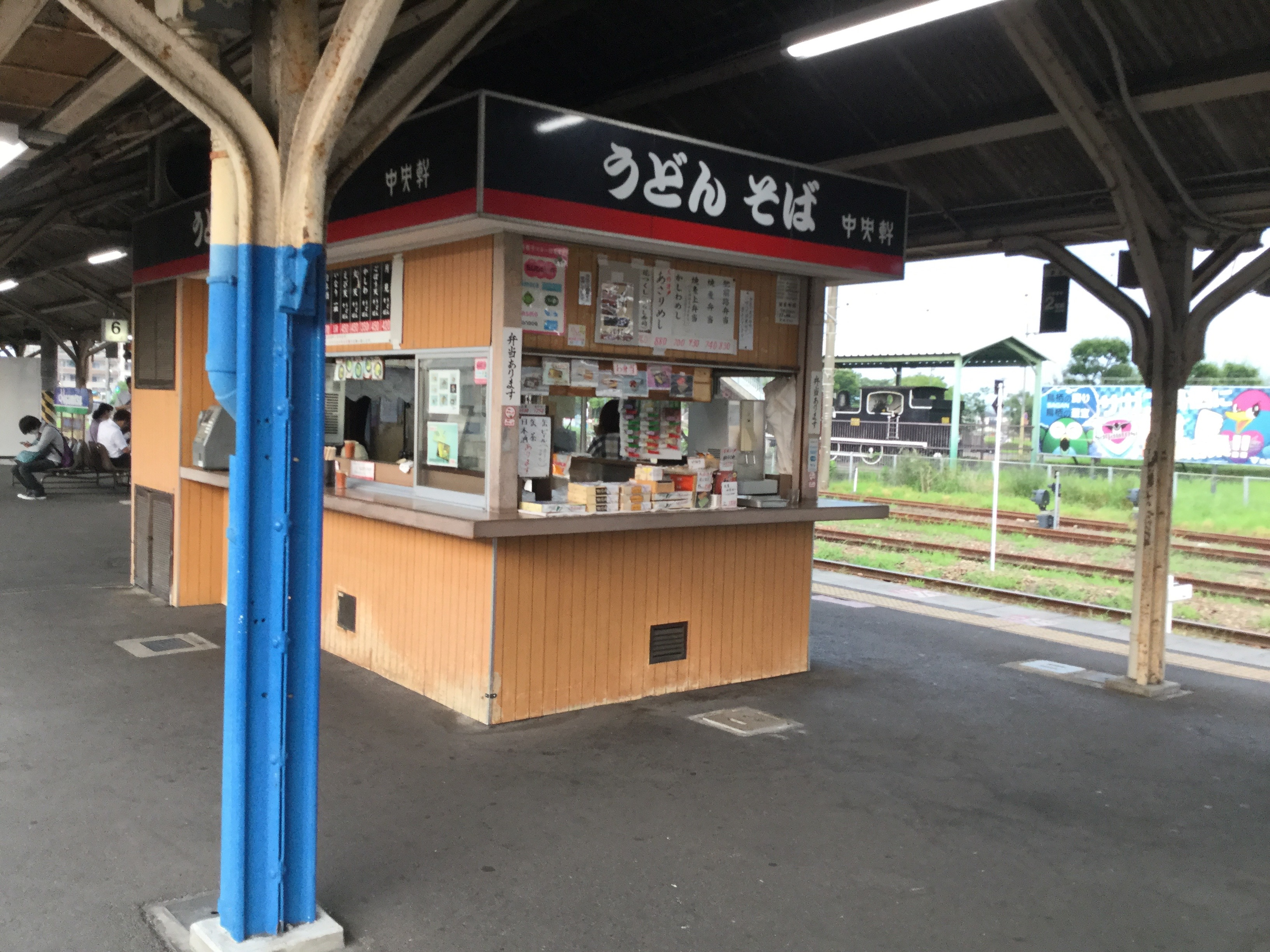
An udon/soba stand on the platform.

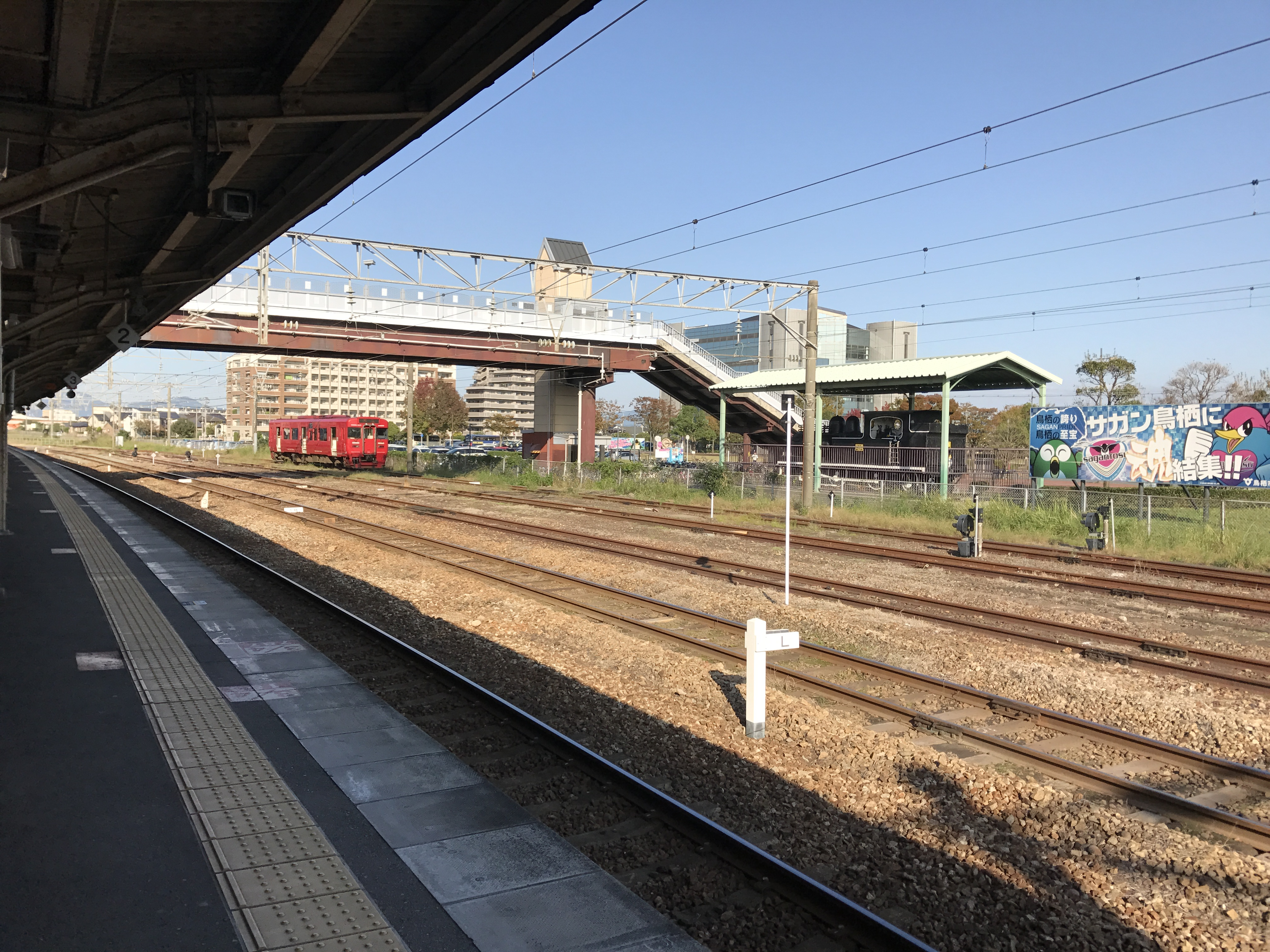
A view of the east side of the station. Note the numerous passing loops and also the Rainbow Bridge and the steam locomotive on display.

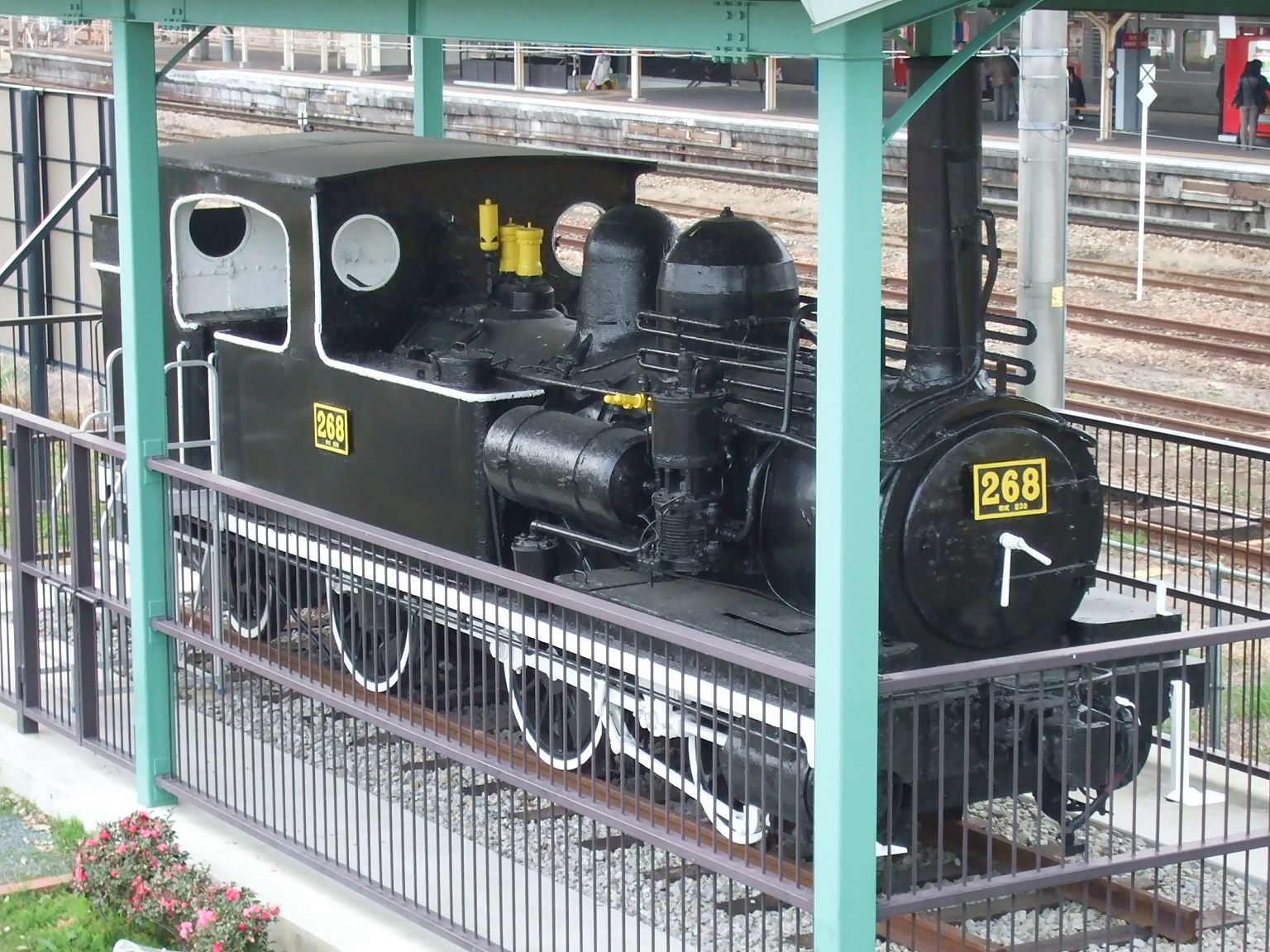
A closer view of the steam locomotive: a JGR Class 230 (No. 268).

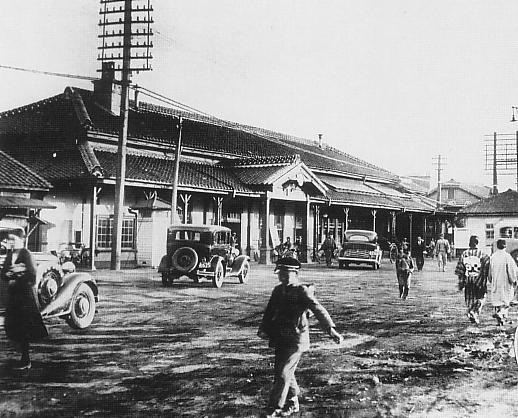
Tosu Station before the Second World War.

=== Platforms ===
1	■Limited express Ariake	for Hakata
1	■Limited express Kamome, Midori, Huis Ten Bosch	for Hakata
1	■Limited express Yufuin-no-mori	for Hakata
1	■Kagoshima Main Line	for Futsukaichi, Hakata, Kokura, and Mojikō
2	■Kagoshima Main Line	for Futsukaichi, Hakata, Kokura, and Mojikō
2	■Nagasaki Main Line	for Saga, Hizen-Yamaguchi, and Isahaya
2	■Kyūdai Main Line	for Chikugo-Yoshii and Hita
3	■Limited express Kamome, Midori	for Hakata
3	■Kagoshima Main Line	for Hakata and Kokura for Kurume and Ōmuta
3	■Nagasaki Main Line	for Saga, Hizen-Yamaguchi, and Isahaya
4	■Kagoshima Main Line	for Hakata・Kokura/To Kurume・Ōmuta
4	■Nagasaki Main Line	for Saga, Hizen-Yamaguchi, and Isahaya
5	■Limited express Kamome, Midori, Huis Ten Bosch	for Saga, Nagasaki, Sasebo, and Huis Ten Bosch
5	■Kagoshima Main Line	for Kurume, Ōmuta, and Arao
5	■Nagasaki Main Line	for Saga, Hizen-Yamaguchi, Isahaya, and Haiki
6	■Limited express Ariake	for Ōmuta and Kumamoto
6	■Limited express Yufu, Yufu DX, Yufuinnomori	for Hita, Yufuin, and Ōita
6	■Kagoshima Main Line	for Kurume, Ōmuta, and Arao

== Adjacent stations ==
«	Service	»
Nagasaki Main Line
JB 08 Futsukaichi	Midori; Relay Kamome; Huis Ten Bosch	JH 02 Shin-Tosu

== History ==
The station was opened on 11 December 1889 by the privately run Kyushu Railway after the construction of a track between Hakata and the (now closed) Chitosegawa temporary stop with Tosu as one of several intermediate stations on the line. On 20 August 1891, a track was laid from Tosu to Saga. When the Kyushu Railway was nationalized on 1 July 1907, Japanese Government Railways (JGR) took over control of the station. On 12 October 1909, the station became part of the Hitoyoshi and Nagasaki Main Lines. On 21 November 1909, the Hitoyoshi Main Line was renamed the Kagoshima Main Line. With the privatization of Japanese National Railways (JNR), the successor of JGR, on 1 April 1987, JR Kyushu took over control of the station.

The present station building was built in 1903. An extension in 1911 left the original Meiji era building structure intact. It is one of the oldest existing railway station buildings in Kyushu. Despite its historical value, the Saga City authorities decided, in May 2017, to build a new station building slightly to the south of the existing one. The new building will be a hashigami structure in which the station facilities would be located on a bridge spanning the tracks. The project would take about ten years to complete. The city authorities explained that a new building was necessary due to the limited space available in the present building but that it would consider measures to preserve and repurpose the historic structure.

== Passenger statistics ==
In fiscal 2020, the station was used by an average of 5207 passengers daily (boarding passengers only), and it ranked 26th among the busiest stations of JR Kyushu.

== Surrounding area ==
- Tosu Stadium (home to J. League team Sagan Tosu)
- Tosu Premium Outlets (15 minutes by bus)
- Saga Racetrack (13 minutes by bus)

== Bus routes ==
- Nishitetsu Bus Saga
  - To Tosu city center, Kurume Station (Nishitetsu), Kiyama, Metabara, Kanzaki
  - To Ogōri Station (Nishitetsu)
  - To Tosu Premium Outlets

== See also ==
- List of railway stations in Japan
