= Huis Ten Bosch (theme park) =

Theme park in Nagasaki, Japan

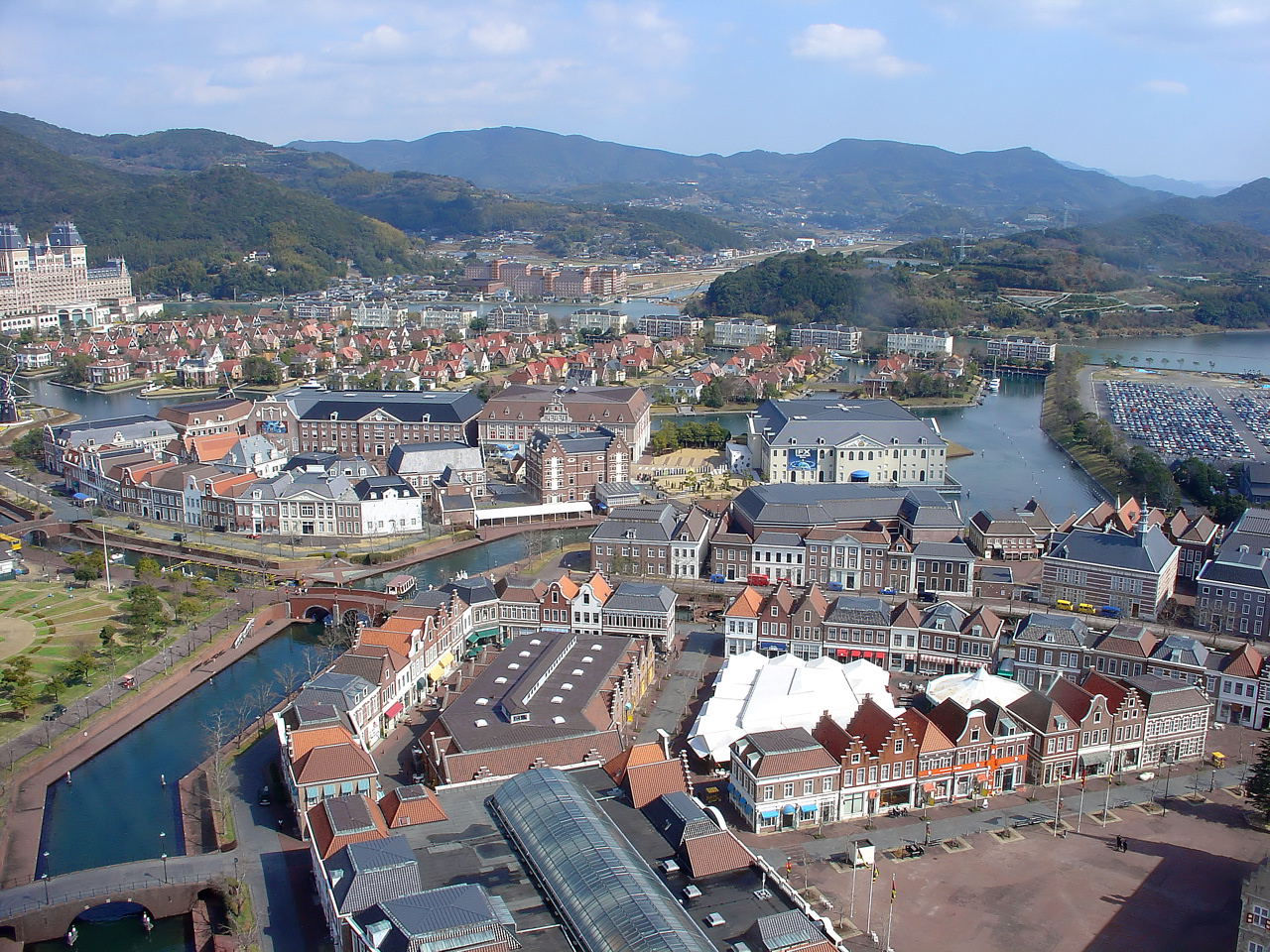
- Interactive map of Huis Ten Bosch
- Location: 1-1 Huis Ten Bosch Machi, Sasebo, Nagasaki 859-3292, Japan
- Coordinates: 33.08377°N 129.78812°E
- Status: Operating
- Opened: 25 March 1992
- Owner: Huis Ten Bosch Tourism Co., Ltd.
- General manager: Katsuhiko Sakaguchi
- Theme: Netherlands
- Slogan: Japan's Largest Theme Park
- Operating season: Year-round
- Attendance: 2.54 million (as of September 2019)
- Area: 152 ha (380 acres)
- Website: english.huistenbosch.co.jp

Huis Ten Bosch (Japanese: ハウステンボス, Hepburn: Hausu Ten Bosu) is a theme park in Sasebo, Nagasaki, Japan, which recreates the Netherlands and displays life-sized copies of old Dutch buildings. The name Huis Ten Bosch translates into English as "House at the Woods/Forest". It is named after Huis ten Bosch in The Hague, one of the three official residences of the Dutch royal family. The park features many Dutch-style buildings such as hotels, villas, theatres, museums, shops, and restaurants, along with canals, windmills, amusement rides, and a park planted with seasonal flowers.

== History ==
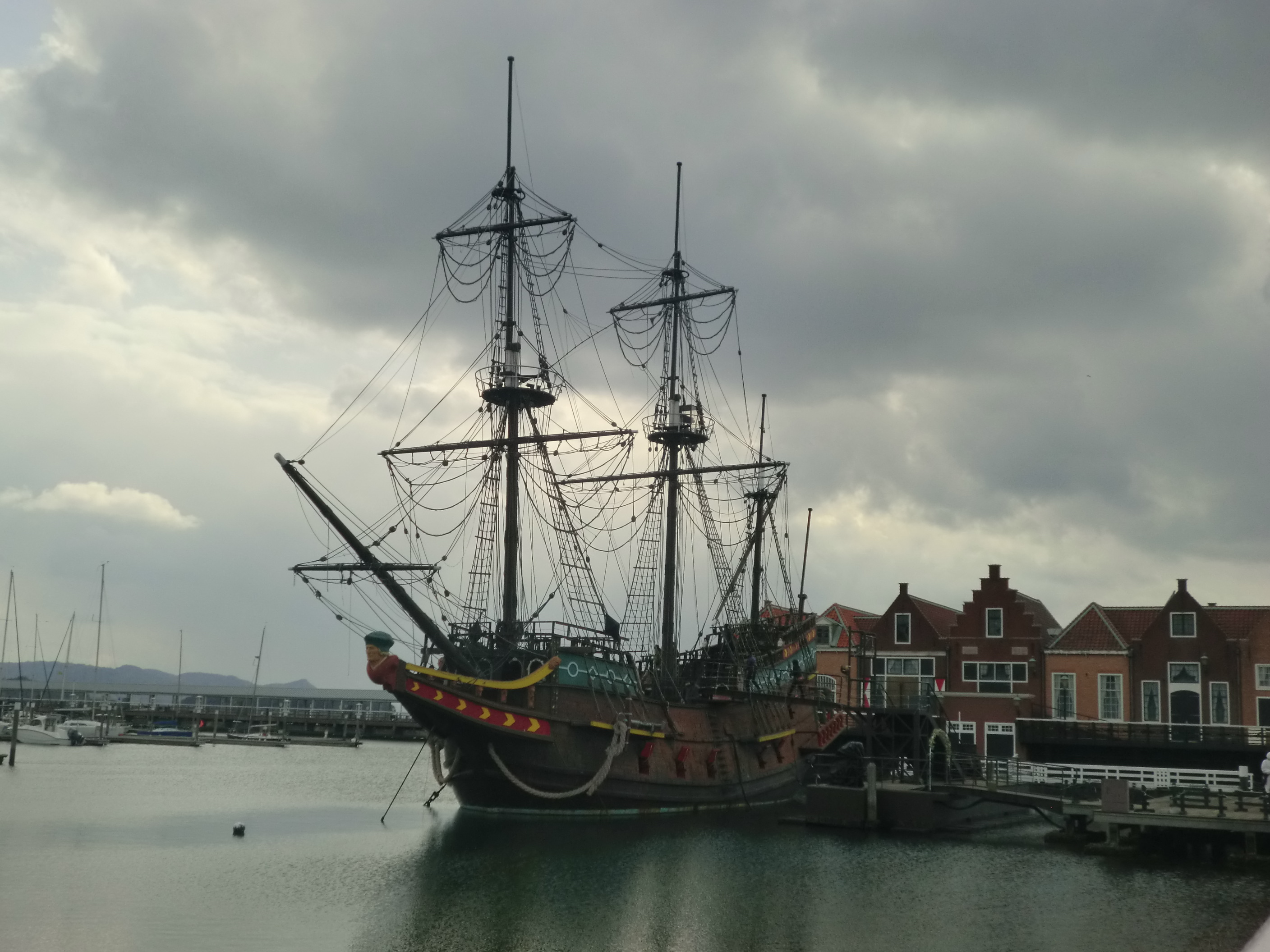
Replica of De Liefde, first Dutch ship to reach Japan in 1600 with William Adams and Jan Joosten

The site of the park was originally a Dutch trading post, which was built in 1609. Afterward, it was an industrial landfill; however, during World War II, the site of the theme park was converted into the Harioko Navy College to relieve congestion at Etajima Naval College. After the War, the college was torn down.

In 1979, Yoshikuni Kamichika visited the Netherlands, and became inspired to build an amusement park inspired by the country. In 1983, he had completed the "Nagasaki Holland Village", a Dutch-themed town and theme park 10 hectares (25 acres) in size, which is 40 minutes away from the current Huis Ten Bosch harbor by boat. It was financially successful, so he decided to extend the idea to Huis Ten Bosch, which would be geared more toward adults.

Kamichika started work on Huis Ten Bosch in October 1988. Designed by a group of architects known as "the Committee of the Fifteen", which was chaired by architect Takekuni Ikeda, the park opened on 25 March 1992 and cost ¥2.1 trillion to build, receiving financial support from banks and transport companies. The project included the planting of 400,000 trees and the digging of 6 kilometres (3.7 mi) of canals. It also saw the addition of 250 villas, modeled after the town of Wassenaar, and bricks from the Netherlands were imported for its construction. It is named after Huis ten Bosch (translates to "House at the Woods/Forest") in The Hague, one of the three official residences of the Dutch royal family.

The park was built during an economic bubble and recorded a peak attendance of 4.25 million visitors in 1996. However, the number of visitors later declined due to the market crash that followed, and the park declared bankruptcy in 2003 with debt of ¥220 billion. The rebuilding plan was sponsored by Nomura Principal Finance Company until March 2010, when H.I.S., a travel agency, took over the management by injecting ¥2 billion into the project. In 2022, the shares owned by H.I.S. were sold to PAG, an investment firm, for ¥66.6 billion, and shares owned by five other companies were sold to PAG as well, making the total paid to the investment firm ¥100 billion. The company suffered financially during the pandemic, but started to become more profitable during 2022.

In 2015, the Henn na Hotel (変なホテル, Hen na Hoteru; lit. "Strange Hotel") opened at the park. The hotel was the first worldwide to be completely staffed by robots, a project sponsored and funded by the government. However, after the change in shareholders, it was refitted as the Hotel Rotterdam, which reopened in October 2023.

On June 21, 2025, Huis Ten Bosch opened a new area of the park themed after the character Miffy, who appears in picture books written by Dick Bruna. The "Miffy Wonder Square" was created to target younger markets, and according to current Huis Ten Bosch Co. president Kotaro Takamura, the area's creation was the largest and most financially intensive project undertaken by the company since the theme park's opening. The area includes a ride, a restaurant, and a shop, each themed after Miffy.

== Overview ==
Canals and Dom Tower

Huis Ten Bosch contains 11 attractions, 12 museums, 61 shops, 53 restaurants, and five hotels. The park features many Dutch-style buildings such as hotels, villas, theatres, museums, shops, and restaurants, along with canals, windmills, amusement rides, and a park planted with seasonal flowers. It contains replicas of Gouda Town Hall and the Dom Tower, and a recreation of the original Huis ten Bosch palace and garden, which serves as a museum. The Dom Tower at the park is 105 metres (344 ft) tall. All of the park's museums are integrated into and located in the park. Villas located at the park's canals are available for rent or for rent as timeshares.

It is the biggest theme park by land in Japan as of 2025, with an area of 153 hectares (380 acres). It is located around 12 kilometres (7.5 mi) southeast of Sasebo on Hario Island, an area of reclaimed marshland on the main coastline of Kyushu facing Ōmura Bay. Its location in this area of the country reflects the historical relations between the Netherlands and Japan, which began in 1609 when a trading post was opened by the Dutch in Hirado, an island off the coast of Kyushu around 35 kilometres (22 mi) northwest of central Sasebo.

Huis Ten Bosch Station, operated by the Kyushu Railway Company, serves trains on the Ōmura Line, which runs along the Ōmura Bay. The park can also be reached by boat from Nagasaki Airport or Sasebo via Huis Ten Bosch Marina and Harbour. It is located to the south of Fukuoka and to the north of Nagasaki.

Huis Ten Bosch is open daily from 9.00 AM to 9.30 PM between March and November, and from 9.00 AM to 8.30 PM between December and February.

The waste products coming from the park are treated to create energy and compost.

== See also ==
- List of amusement parks in Asia
