= TSJ =

TSJ may refer to:

- La Mega Media, formerly TSJ Media
- Supreme Tribunal of Justice (Venezuela), abbreviated in Spanish as TSJ
- Tsushima Airport, IATA code TSJ
- Terrence Shannon Jr. (born 2000), American basketball player
