= Iki Airport =

Small airport in Nagasaki Prefecture, Japan

Iki Airport 壱岐空港
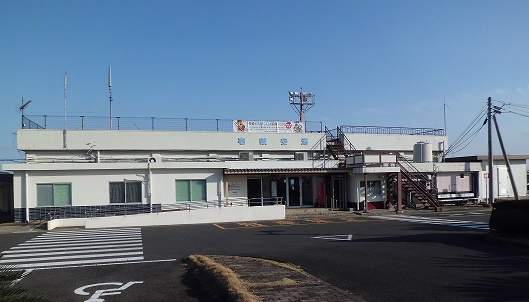
- IATA: IKI; ICAO: RJDB

Summary
- Airport type: Public
- Operator: Government
- Serves: Iki, Nagasaki
- Location: Iki Island
- Elevation AMSL: 41 ft (12 m)
- Coordinates: 33°44′57″N 129°47′09″E

Map
- Location in Japan RJDB (Japan)

Runways
Direction	Length		Surface
Direction	m	ft	Surface
02/20	1,200	3,937	Asphalt

Statistics (2015)
- Passengers: 30,852
- Cargo (metric tonnes): 1
- Aircraft movement: 1,617
- Source: Japanese Ministry of Land, Infrastructure, Transport and Tourism

Iki Airport (壱岐空港, Iki Kūkō) (IATA: IKI, ICAO: RJDB) is a small airport in the city of Iki on Iki Island in Nagasaki Prefecture, Japan.

== History ==
Iki Airport was opened on July 10, 1964. Initially, the airport was served by All Nippon Airways with flights to Fukuoka; however, with the introduction of high speed jetfoil services between Fukuoka and Iki, flights to Fukuoka were discontinued from 2005. Flights to Tsushima, which were begun in 1980 by Oriental Air Bridge were discontinued in 1986. At present, the airport is connected only to Nagasaki with two flights per day.

== Airlines and destinations ==
Airlines	Destinations
Oriental Air Bridge	Nagasaki
