= Iki Island =

Archipelago in the Tsushima Strait

Iki
Native name: 壱岐島, Iki-no-shima, Iki rettō
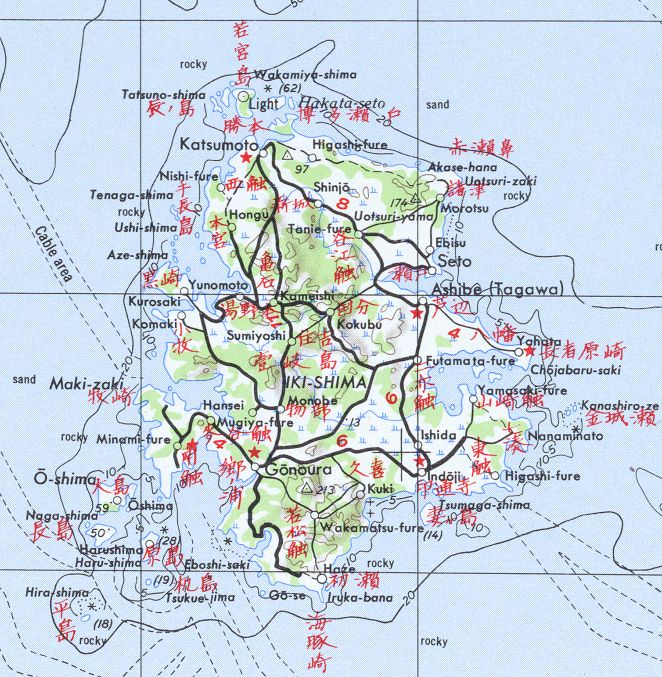
- Map of Iki-no-shima

- Map of Nagasaki Prefecture with Iki Islands in red

- Location of Iki Islands Iki Island (Nagasaki Prefecture)

Geography
- Coordinates: 33°47′N 129°43′E
- Adjacent to: Tsushima Strait
- Total islands: 4 inhabited, 18 total
- Area: 138.46 km^{2} (53.46 sq mi)
- Highest elevation: 212.9 m (698.5 ft)
- Highest point: Takenotsuji

Administration
- Japan
- Prefectures: Nagasaki
- City: Iki

Demographics
- Population: 28,008 (2013)
- Pop. density: 202/km^{2} (523/sq mi)
- Ethnic groups: Japanese

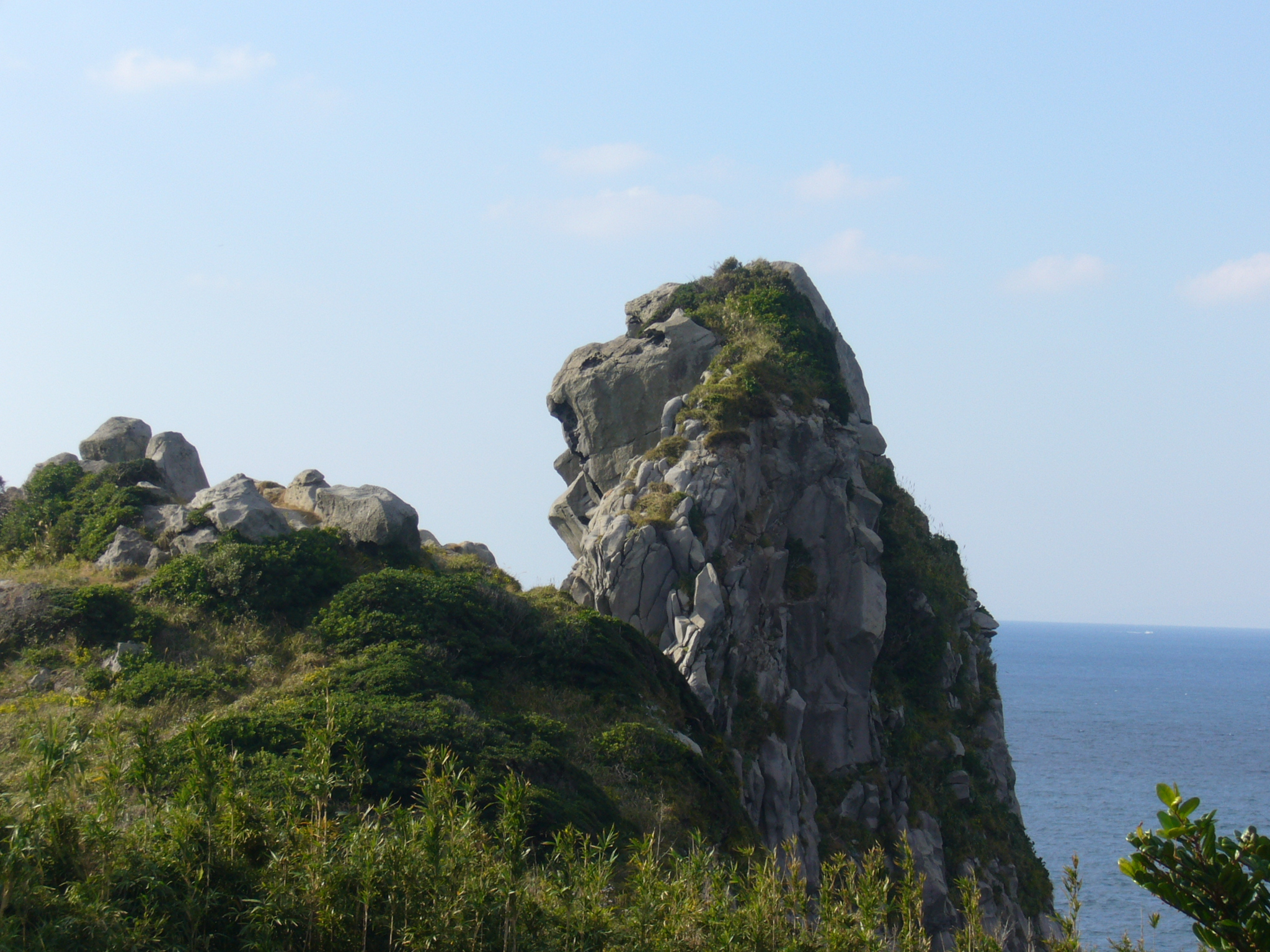
Saruiwa of Iki Island

Aerial view of Iki Island in 2017

Iki Island (壱岐島, Iki-no-shima), or the Iki Archipelago (壱岐諸島, Iki-shotō), is an archipelago in the Tsushima Strait, which is administered as the city of Iki in Nagasaki Prefecture, Japan. The islands have a total area of 138.46 square kilometres (53.46 sq mi) with a total population of 28,008. Only four (4) of the twenty-three (23) named islands are permanently inhabited. Together with the neighboring islands of Tsushima, they are collectively within the borders of the Iki–Tsushima Quasi-National Park.

== Geology ==
The Iki Islands are volcanic in origin: they are the exposed and eroded basaltic summit of a massive Quaternary stratovolcano last active over 600,000 years ago.

Iki Island is slightly oval in shape, and measures approximately 17 kilometres (11 mi) from north–south and 14 kilometres (8.7 mi) from east–west. The highest elevation is Takenotsuji (岳ノ辻), a weakly curved peak with a highest elevation at 212.9 metres (698 ft) above sea level. The average height of the land surface is 100 meters above sea level.

The archipelago is approximately 20 kilometres (11 nmi) north-northeast of the Kyushu coast at its closest point and southeast of the Tsushima Islands.

== History ==
The Iki Islands have been inhabited since the Japanese Paleolithic era, and numerous artifacts from the Jōmon, Yayoi and Kofun periods have been found by archaeologists, indicating continuous human occupation and activity.

=== Ikikoku ===
Map illustrating the path from the Daifeng commandery to Yamatai, and its distances in the Wajinden.

In the Chinese Wèizhì Wōrén chuán (Japanese 魏志倭人伝, Gishi Wajinden), part of the Records of the Three Kingdoms dating from the third century, mention is made of a country called “Iki”, (一支国, Iki-koku), located on an archipelago east of the Korean Peninsula. Archaeologists have tentatively identified this with the large Yayoi period settlement of Harunotsuji, one of the largest to have been discovered in Japan, where artifacts uncovered indicate a close contact with the Japanese islands and the Asian mainland.

It is sometimes referred to as "Idaikoku (一大国)", which may be a typographic error.

In historical records. It was said to have bigger fields than Tsukaikoku and a population three times larger.

There is a museum dedicated to the country located in Nagasaki.

=== Iki Province ===
The islands were organized as Iki Province under the Ritsuryō reforms in the latter half of the seventh century, and the name Iki-no-kuni appears on wooden markers found in the imperial capital of Nara.

During the Heian period, the island was attacked by Jurchen pirates in the Toi invasion of 1019. Afterwards, the islands came under the rule of the Matsura clan, who developed trade and commercial relations between Goryeo in Korea, Tsushima, Iki and Kyushu. However, the islands were again devastated by the Kamakura period Mongol invasions of Japan in 1274 and 1281 during which time many of its inhabitants were slaughtered. Throughout the Muromachi period, the islands were a main base for the Japanese Wokou pirates, who plundered coastal settlements in Korea and China. Following the establishment of the Tokugawa shogunate in the Edo period, the islands came under the rule of Hirado Domain.

=== Modern period ===
Following the Meiji Restoration, the islands became part of "Hirado Prefecture" from 1871, which then became part of Nagasaki Prefecture.

The islands were fortified with numerous coastal artillery batteries during World War II, but did not experience any combat. Remains of these fortifications can be found on the island of Wakamiyajima, north of the main Iki Island. On November 18, 1948, Lt. William Downham, from the USAF 36th Fighter Group stationed at Ashiya Air Field, experienced engine failure in his North American P-51 Mustang while patrolling the Korea Strait between Japan and the Korean Peninsula. He successfully parachuted onto Iki Island.

In the 1960s and 1970s, in particularly the town of Iki, the islanders were notorious for overfishing, but blamed declining catches on the local species of whales and dolphins. In 1977, the local fishermen invited television companies to film the mass slaughter of dolphins. In response, activists heavily condemned the fishermen's acts of killing the dolphins. In view of the already endangered Japanese amberjack, the local town government banned large-scale, commercial fishing of Japanese amberjack after 1982.

A group of small scale fishermen in 2016 were reported as fighting back against this overfishing. As of 2018 fishermen are protesting against large vessels from Mainland Japan overfishing around Iki island.

== In popular culture ==
The island features in the 2020 video game Ghost of Tsushima. It is an expansion pack for the game with the main game taking place on Tsushima.

== Climate ==
Climate data for Isida, Iki (2003−2020 normals, extremes 2003−present)
Month	Jan	Feb	Mar	Apr	May	Jun	Jul	Aug	Sep	Oct	Nov	Dec	Year
Record high °C (°F)	19.0 (66.2)	20.2 (68.4)	22.7 (72.9)	25.1 (77.2)	29.1 (84.4)	29.6 (85.3)	34.3 (93.7)	35.0 (95.0)	33.6 (92.5)	30.2 (86.4)	24.6 (76.3)	23.4 (74.1)	35.0 (95.0)
Mean daily maximum °C (°F)	9.6 (49.3)	10.9 (51.6)	13.6 (56.5)	17.7 (63.9)	21.8 (71.2)	24.3 (75.7)	28.3 (82.9)	30.1 (86.2)	26.7 (80.1)	22.5 (72.5)	17.6 (63.7)	12.0 (53.6)	19.6 (67.3)
Daily mean °C (°F)	6.4 (43.5)	7.7 (45.9)	10.4 (50.7)	14.3 (57.7)	18.4 (65.1)	21.5 (70.7)	25.5 (77.9)	27.1 (80.8)	24.1 (75.4)	19.5 (67.1)	14.3 (57.7)	8.6 (47.5)	16.5 (61.7)
Mean daily minimum °C (°F)	2.6 (36.7)	3.9 (39.0)	6.6 (43.9)	10.8 (51.4)	15.2 (59.4)	19.3 (66.7)	23.5 (74.3)	24.7 (76.5)	21.8 (71.2)	16.4 (61.5)	10.3 (50.5)	4.5 (40.1)	13.3 (55.9)
Record low °C (°F)	−4.9 (23.2)	−5.6 (21.9)	−1.9 (28.6)	1.8 (35.2)	7.1 (44.8)	12.3 (54.1)	17.6 (63.7)	17.7 (63.9)	13.5 (56.3)	7.3 (45.1)	1.2 (34.2)	−2.7 (27.1)	−5.6 (21.9)
Average precipitation mm (inches)	65.7 (2.59)	75.4 (2.97)	116.5 (4.59)	137.9 (5.43)	141.2 (5.56)	257.3 (10.13)	327.3 (12.89)	249.0 (9.80)	150.2 (5.91)	106.5 (4.19)	90.9 (3.58)	80.0 (3.15)	1,797.8 (70.78)
Average rainy days (≥ 1.0 mm)	7.8	8.9	9.2	8.9	8.1	10.3	11.0	8.9	9.8	6.7	8.0	8.4	106
Source 1: JMA
Source 2: JMA

Climate data for Ashibe, Iki (1991−2020 normals, extremes 1977−present)
Month	Jan	Feb	Mar	Apr	May	Jun	Jul	Aug	Sep	Oct	Nov	Dec	Year
Record high °C (°F)	18.6 (65.5)	21.2 (70.2)	22.5 (72.5)	26.9 (80.4)	29.7 (85.5)	30.5 (86.9)	34.6 (94.3)	34.8 (94.6)	34.0 (93.2)	29.7 (85.5)	25.7 (78.3)	22.7 (72.9)	34.6 (94.3)
Mean daily maximum °C (°F)	8.7 (47.7)	9.7 (49.5)	12.7 (54.9)	17.2 (63.0)	21.5 (70.7)	24.3 (75.7)	28.1 (82.6)	29.7 (85.5)	26.1 (79.0)	21.6 (70.9)	16.4 (61.5)	11.2 (52.2)	18.9 (66.1)
Daily mean °C (°F)	6.2 (43.2)	6.9 (44.4)	9.7 (49.5)	13.7 (56.7)	17.7 (63.9)	20.9 (69.6)	24.9 (76.8)	26.3 (79.3)	23.1 (73.6)	18.7 (65.7)	13.7 (56.7)	8.5 (47.3)	15.9 (60.6)
Mean daily minimum °C (°F)	3.7 (38.7)	4.3 (39.7)	7.0 (44.6)	10.8 (51.4)	14.8 (58.6)	18.5 (65.3)	22.7 (72.9)	23.9 (75.0)	21.0 (69.8)	16.4 (61.5)	11.0 (51.8)	5.8 (42.4)	13.3 (56.0)
Record low °C (°F)	−5.5 (22.1)	−5.6 (21.9)	−1.5 (29.3)	1.8 (35.2)	9.0 (48.2)	12.0 (53.6)	16.6 (61.9)	17.4 (63.3)	14.4 (57.9)	6.6 (43.9)	1.7 (35.1)	−3.4 (25.9)	−5.6 (21.9)
Average precipitation mm (inches)	76.1 (3.00)	78.6 (3.09)	127.8 (5.03)	148.7 (5.85)	165.0 (6.50)	273.1 (10.75)	316.1 (12.44)	250.9 (9.88)	173.7 (6.84)	94.1 (3.70)	97.5 (3.84)	79.4 (3.13)	1,881 (74.05)
Average rainy days (≥ 1.0 mm)	8.5	8.3	10.1	9.4	8.9	11.6	10.9	9.5	10.4	7.3	7.9	7.8	110.6
Mean monthly sunshine hours	124.9	138.3	169.8	190.2	199.4	134.0	174.5	195.0	159.2	174.2	146.9	133.8	1,940.2
Source 1: JMA
Source 2: JMA

== Transportation ==
Iki Island has ferry terminals in Ashibe, Ishida and Gōnoura, which connect Iki to mainland Japan such as Fukuoka and Kitakyushu. Located on the east coast Iki Airport connects the island to Nagasaki Airport in Nagasaki. The Japan National Route 382 connects the hamlets of the island together, and the bus company "Iki-kōtsu" provides for public transport.

== Islands ==
Photo	Name	Kanji	Area [km^{2}]	Population	highest point [m]	Peak	Coordinates
	Iki Island	壱岐島	133.8	13,178	213	Takenotsuji	33°47′N 129°43′E
	Harushima	原島	0.53	140			33°43′23″N 129°38′56″E
	Nagashima	長島	0.51	170			33°43′38″N 129°37′53″E
	Oshima	大島	1.16	200			33°44′17″N 129°38′5″E
	Wakamiyajima	若宮島	0.35	-	99.7		33°51′56″N 129°41′11″E
