= Nagasaki Airport =

Airport in Omura, Nagasaki Prefecture, Japan

Nagasaki Airport 長崎空港
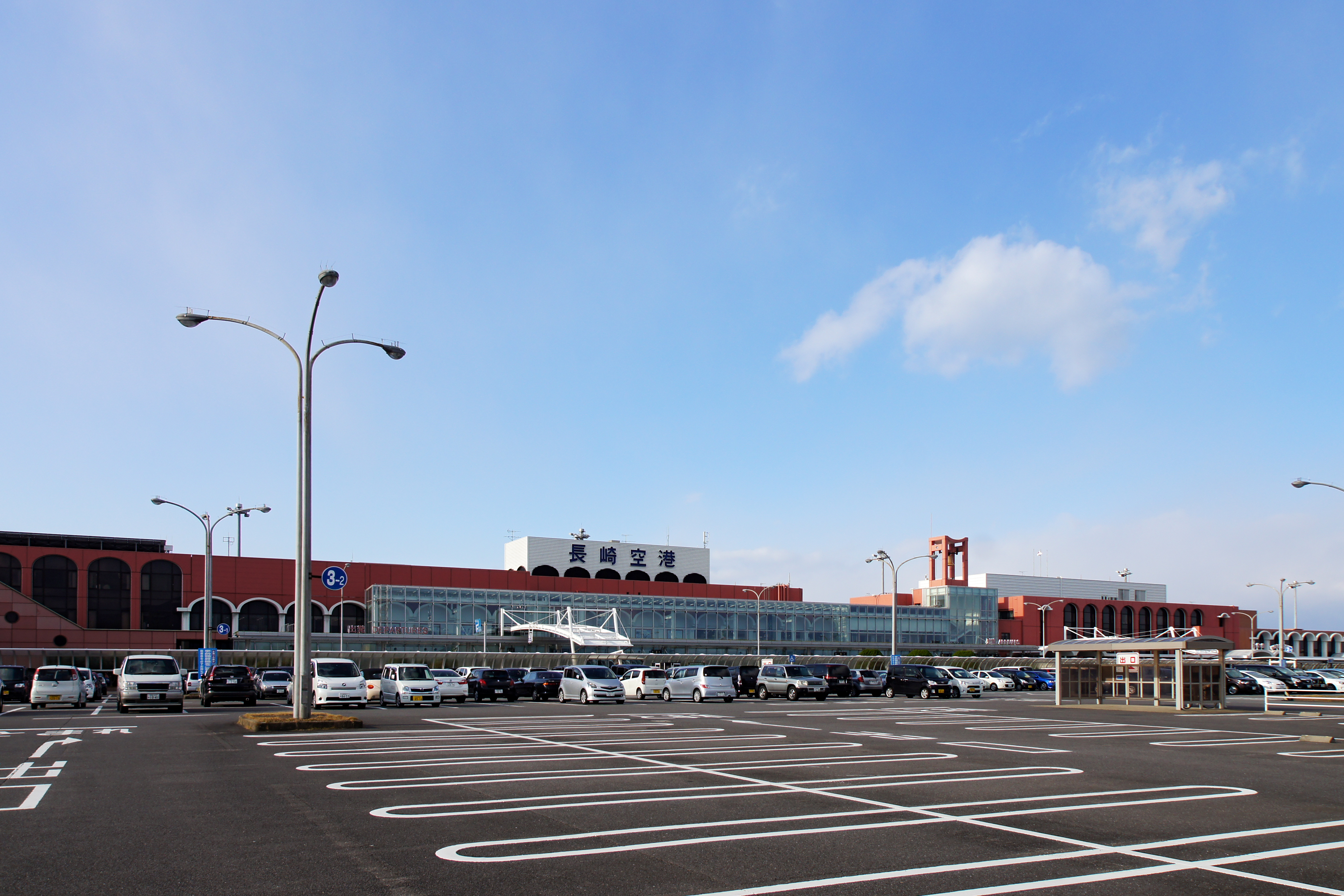
- IATA: NGS; ICAO: RJFU

Summary
- Airport type: Public
- Operator: Civil Aviation Bureau
- Location: Ōmura, Nagasaki Prefecture, Japan
- Opened: May 1, 1975; 51 years ago
- Hub for: Oriental Air Bridge
- Elevation AMSL: 8 ft (2.4 m)
- Coordinates: 32°55′01″N 129°54′49″E
- Website: www.nagasaki-airport.jp

Map
- Location in Nagasaki Prefecture Location in Japan

Runways
Direction	Length		Surface
Direction	m	ft	Surface
14/32	3,000	9,843	Asphalt

Statistics (2024)
- Passengers: 3,065,040 ▲7.1%
- Cargo (metric tonnes): 4,586
- Aircraft movement: 16,112
- Source: Nagasaki Airport Japanese Ministry of Land, Infrastructure, Transport and Tourism

Nagasaki Airport (長崎空港, Nagasaki Kūkō) (IATA: NGS, ICAO: RJFU) is an airport located off the coast of Ōmura, Nagasaki Prefecture, Japan. The airport was the first airport in the world to be built on the ocean, using an existing small island located in the center of Ōmura Bay, with land areas that were fully reclaimed.

Nagasaki Airport was built to replace the former airport called Omura Airport, which was located on the mainland and had a shorter runway of 1,200 metres (3,900 ft). The former airport was transferred to the Japan Self-Defense Force in 2011, and was renamed into Omura Air Base.

Oriental Air Bridge, a regional airline is based at the airport.

== History ==
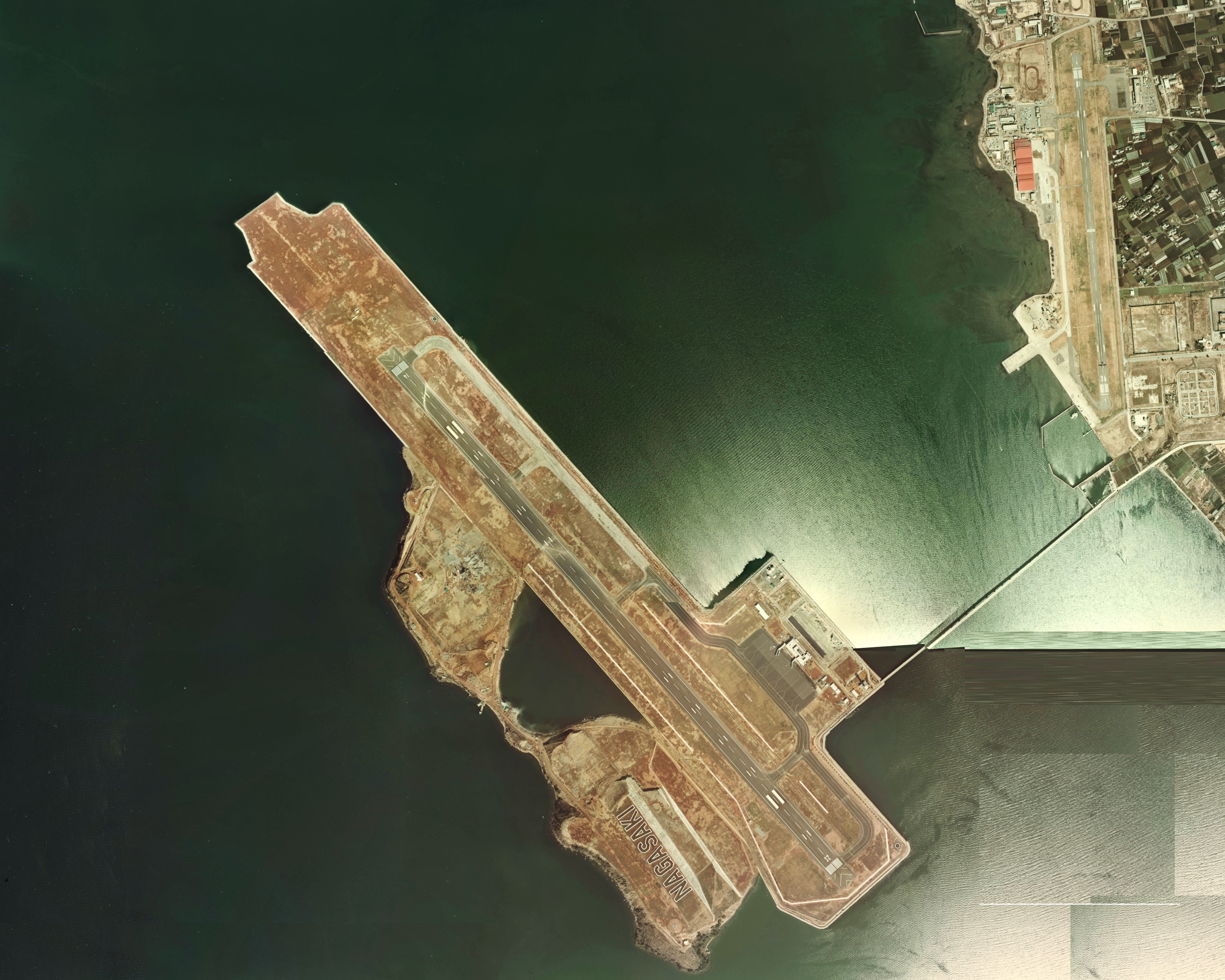
Aerial photograph of Nagasaki Airport under construction taken in 1974; the year before it opened. The former airport is located in the top right corner.

The mainland portion of the airport opened as an Imperial Japanese Navy airfield in 1923, and served as the main base for the now defunct 21st Naval Air Base. During World War II, several aircraft factories were constructed near the airfield and the base was used extensively for manufacturing and repairing many aircraft. After the war, the airfield was converted into a civilian airport and was named Omura Airport (大村空港) in 1955. The terminal building was completed four years later in 1959.

All Nippon Airways began flying to Nagasaki from Fukuoka in May 1959.

In the 1960s, Nagasaki Prefecture was considering building a new airport due to the shift in jet-powered aircraft and due to the number of flights increasing at the airport. Initially, the prefecture planned to expand the former airport, but the plan was abandoned, due to geographical issues. The Prefecture decided to construct the new airport on Mishima Island (Japanese: 箕島), an island located off the coast of the mainland in Ōmura Bay. Before the construction began, 66 residents in 13 households lived on the island and after several years of persuasion from prefecture officials, all of them agreed to move out so that the new airport could be built.

Construction of the new airport began in 1972 and took three years to complete. Constructing the airport required flattening parts of the island's hills and reclaiming land around its shore, expanding it from 0.9 to 1.54 km^{2} (0.35 to 0.59 sq mi). Around the same time, the Mishima Ohashi Bridge (Japanese: 箕島大橋), a 970 meter long bridge, which connects the island from the mainland was built. Construction of the new airport cost around 18 billion yen.

The current island runway and terminal opened on May 1, 1975, and became Japan's first full-scale airport built over water. It was also the first airport in the world to be built on the ocean.

Nagasaki's first international service, to Shanghai, commenced in September 1979 and the main runway was extended from 2,500 m to its current length on the following year.

On September 2, 1990, when the Nagasaki Travel Expo was being held in the city of Nagasaki, an Air France Concorde landed at Nagasaki Airport for the first time. An estimated 15,000 to 20,000 onlookers gathered at the airport, causing severe traffic jams.

The mainland portion of the airport was abolished in 2011 and was transferred to the Japan Self-Defense Forces, where it was renamed into Omura Air Base.

Before the start of the COVID-19 pandemic, Hong Kong Express and China Eastern Airlines operated international flights to and from Hong Kong and Shanghai respectively. In February 2020, the two airlines suspended operations, and international flights at the airport temporarily ceased to exist. In October 2023, China Eastern Airlines resumed flights between Nagasaki and Shanghai after three years and eight months of absence. However, the twice-weekly service was suspended in December 2025 amid political tensions between Japan and China, and remains cancelled through the summer of 2026.

Korean Air reactivated its Seoul-Nagasaki route in October 2024 after an 11-year hiatus. Jeju Air commenced a scheduled service between Muan and Nagasaki in December 2024, but cancelled it after only nine round trips in the wake of the Jeju Air Flight 2216 disaster. Air Busan operated a scheduled service between Busan and Nagasaki from January to April 2026, when the route was suspended due to operational issues despite having a load factor around 90 percent.

== Airlines and destinations ==
Airlines	Destinations
Air Busan	Seasonal: Busan (resumes 5 January 2027)
All Nippon Airways	Tokyo–Haneda
ANA Wings	Nagoya–Centrair, Osaka–Itami
J-Air	Osaka–Itami
Japan Airlines	Tokyo–Haneda
Jetstar Japan	Tokyo–Narita
Korean Air	Seoul–Incheon
Oriental Air Bridge	Fukue, Iki, Tsushima
Peach	Osaka–Kansai
Skymark Airlines	Kobe
Solaseed Air	Tokyo–Haneda

== Statistics ==
Year	Total passengers
1998	3,090,345
1999	3,056,828
2000	2,958,058
2001	2,846,646
2002	2,853,510
2003	2,834,289
2004	2,637,308

== Ground and water transportation ==
=== Bus ===
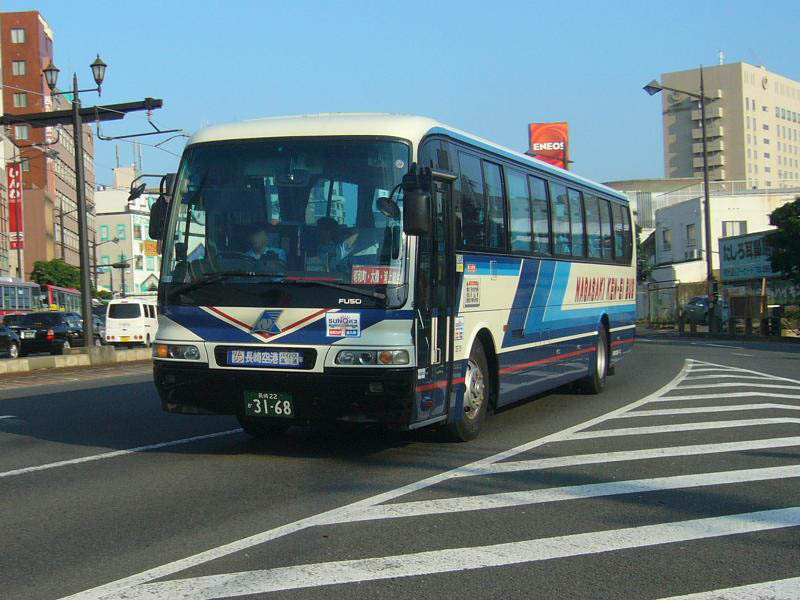
Limousine bus operated by the Nagasaki Prefectural Bus

Several bus companies connect the airport from the cities of Nagasaki, Isahaya, Sasebo, Shimabara, and their surrounding stations.

=== Ferry ===
The airport ferry, which is operated by Yasuda Sangyo Kisen connects the town of Togitsu and the Huis Ten Bosch theme park.

== Accidents and incidents ==
- On July 26, 2008 at 5:25 PM, a privately owned small plane (SOKATA TB-10 manufactured by Aérospatiale) crashed into Ōmura Bay 300 meters from the airport shortly after takeoff. All three passengers were rescued, but one suffered severe injuries and died two days later.
- On June 29, 2017 at around 10:30 AM, a small plane used for pilot training owned by Sojo University (Beechcraft Baron 58) landed at the airport without extending its landing gear. The airport was closed for over three hours and 18 flights were cancelled. All three passengers on board were unharmed.

== Gallery ==
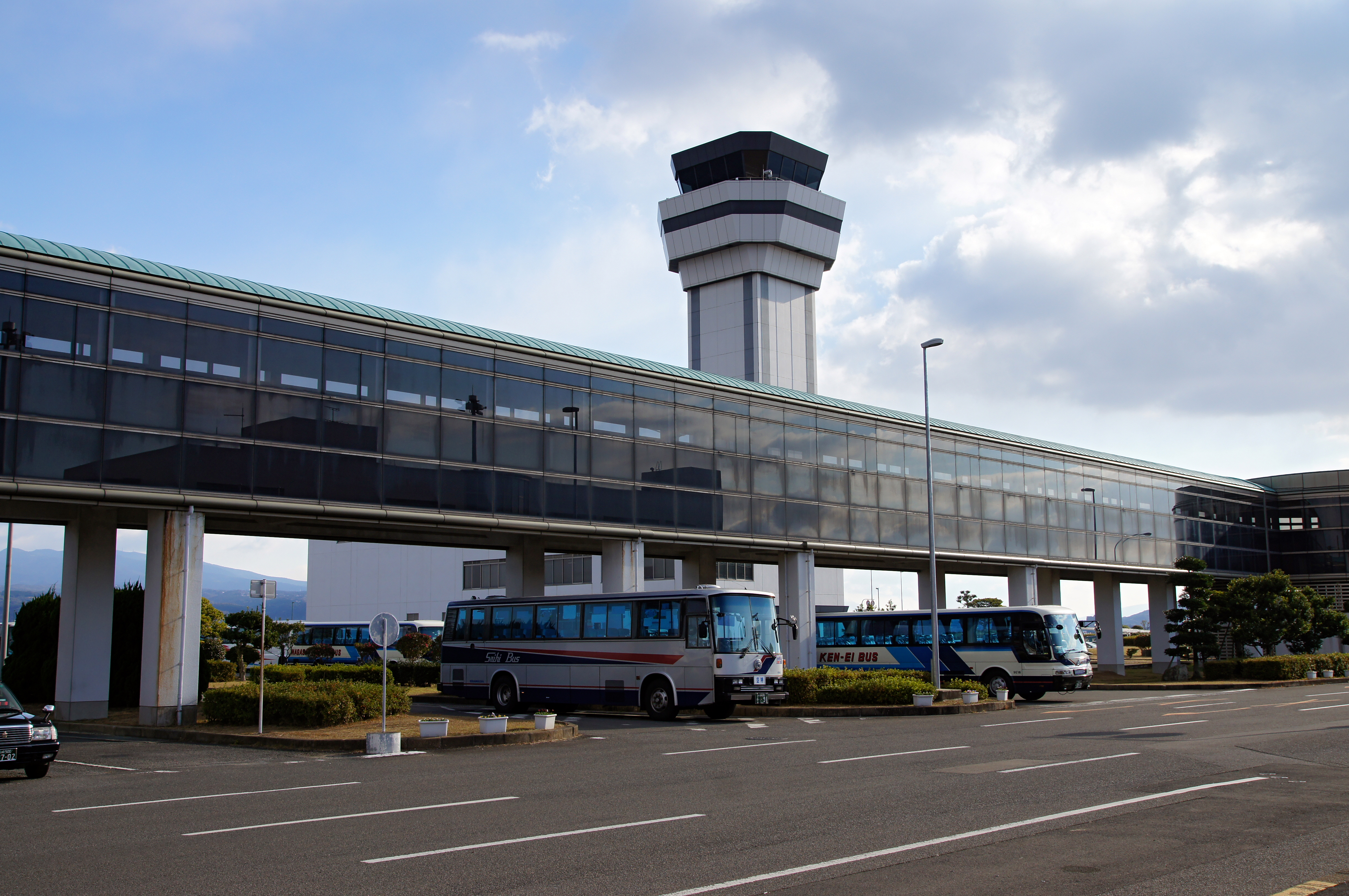
The airport's control tower

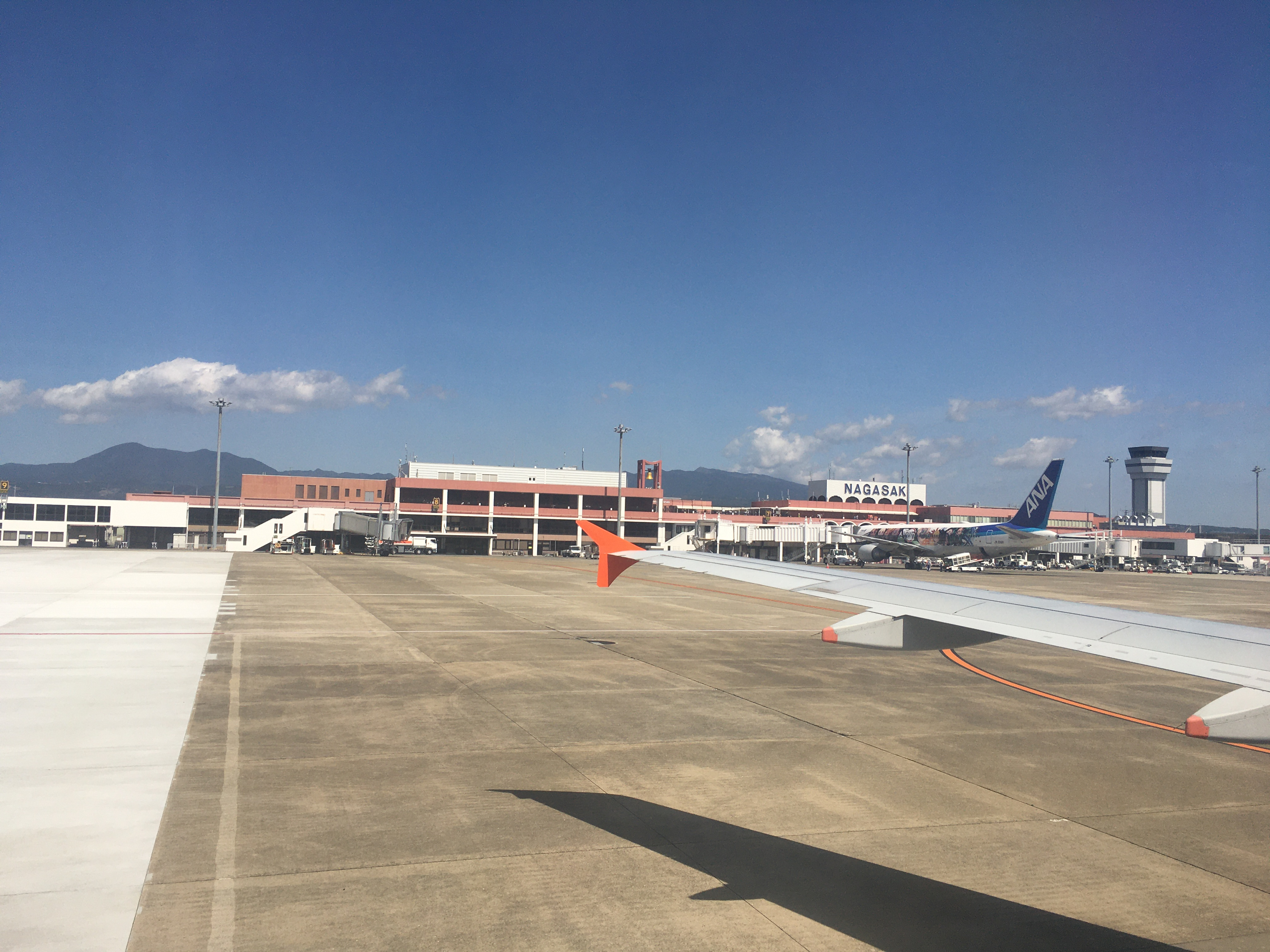
Airport apron

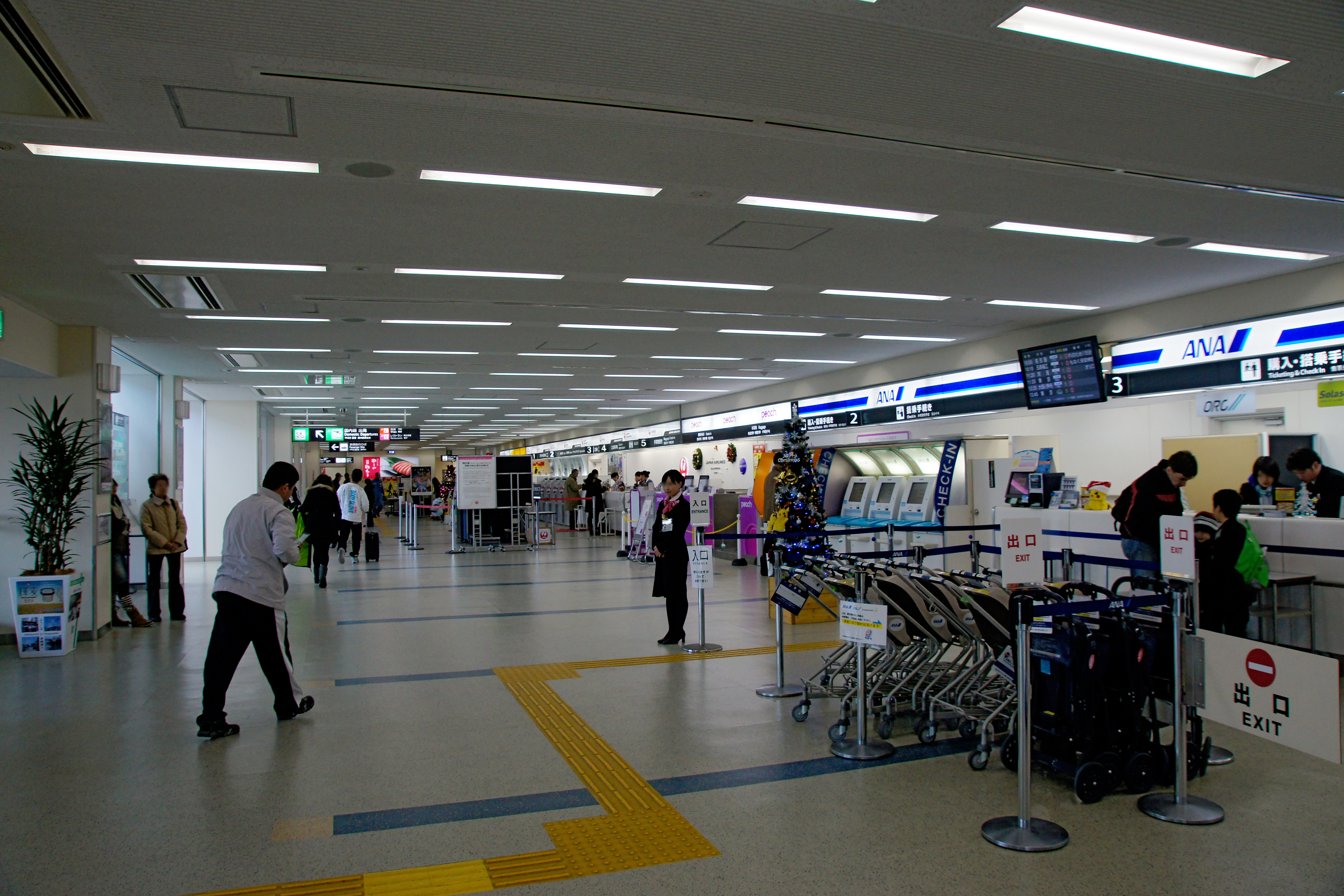
Check-in counters

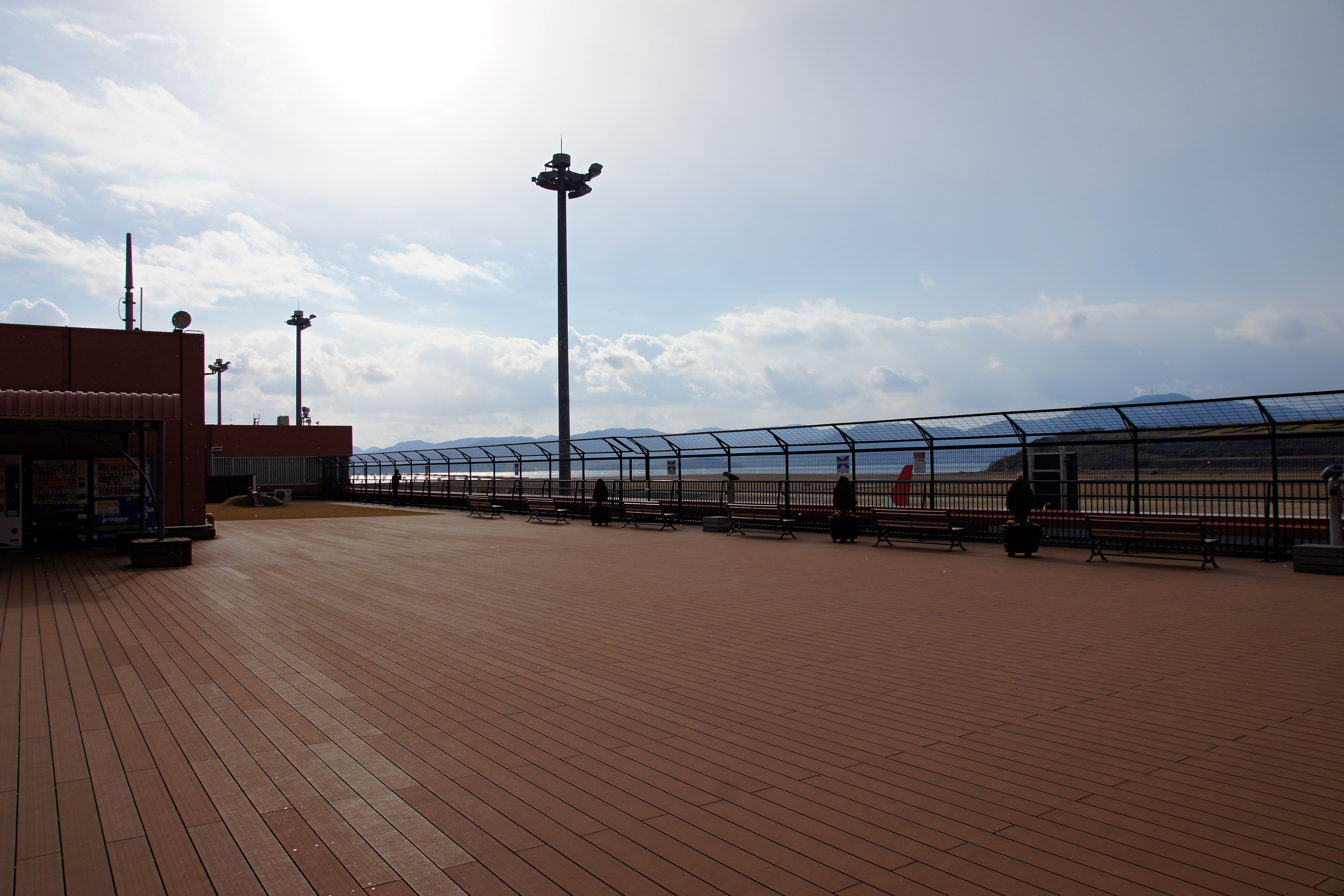
Observation deck

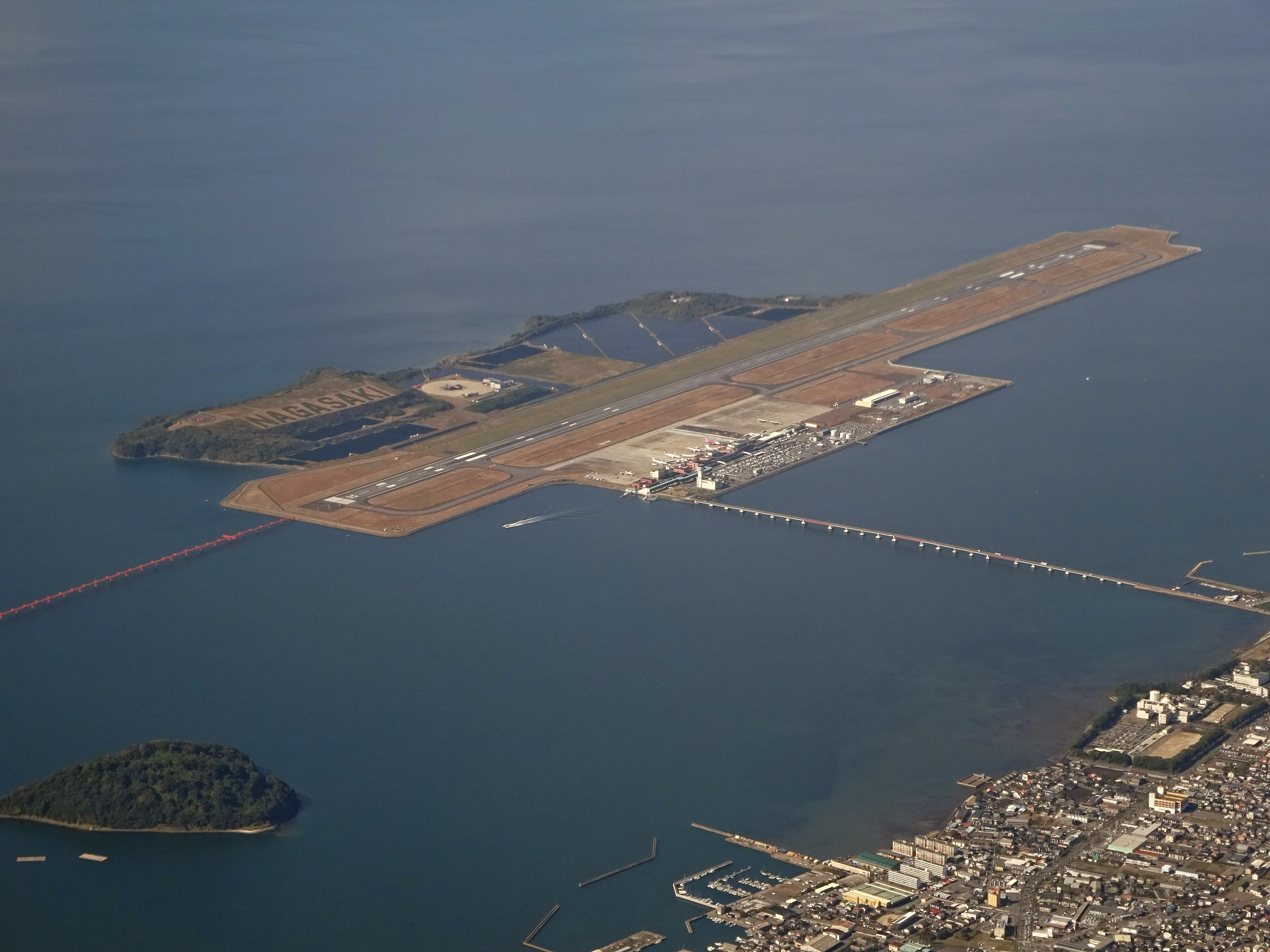
Aerial view of the airport (2021)
