= Hario Island =

Island in Nagasaki prefecture, Japan

Hario
Native name: Japanese: 針尾島
- Location within Japan

Geography
- Location: Ōmura Bay
- Coordinates: 33°5′49″N 129°45′45″E
- Area: 33.16 km^{2} (12.80 sq mi)
- Length: 10 km (6 mi)
- Width: 6 km (3.7 mi)
- Coastline: 63 km (39.1 mi)
- Highest elevation: 174 m (571 ft)
- Highest point: Ushinodake (牛ノ岳)

Administration
- Japan
- Sasebo: Nagasaki Prefecture

Demographics
- Population: 9767 (2015)
- Pop. density: 295/km^{2} (764/sq mi)
- Ethnic groups: Japanese

Hario Island (針尾島) is a large island located in the mouth of Ōmura Bay, part of Nagasaki Prefecture, Japan. The island, 33.16 km² in area, had 9767 inhabitants as of 2015, making it the 7th largest and 6th most populous island in the prefecture. The island is dominated by Citrus unshiu plantations. Seven road bridges connect the island to the mainland of Kyushu, linking it to the cities of Sasebo and Saikai. The main access routes are Japan National Route 202 and Japan National Route 205.

== Geography ==
The Hario island is composed of rhyolite lava flows, resulting in very irregular coastline, except of north-eastern portion where the smoother tidal channel approximately 100 m wide separate Hario island from the Kyushu island. The heavily eroded lava plateau is mostly unsuitable for rice agriculture, with the island dominated by the Citrus unshiu orchards instead. The northern part of the island is hilly, forming an intricate valley network. The bay on the northern tip of the island houses US military station. The housings are concentrated on the north-east, along the tidal channel.

== History ==
Up to Jōmon period the obsidian commonly found on the Hario Island was an important raw material for the stone tools. Later, an attempt was made to make porcelain using a local rhyolite outcrops, but was abandoned. Following a severe power struggle between Ōmura Domain and Hirado Domain during Sengoku period, the island was eventually absorbed into Hirado Domain and development resumed. Thanks to the shallow sea around, land reclamation was extensive starting from the Edo period. By the end of Edo period, the island housed a smoke signal station to notify Hirado Island of the passage of the Dutch merchants to the Dejima. In 1936, the Obashi bridge has connected Hario island to the Saikai city, putting the end to the ferry operations.

Currently islanders are focusing on citrus unshiu, livestock breeding and cultured pearl production, and small scale fishing too to earn a living.

== Attractions ==
- Huis Ten Bosch (theme park)

== See also ==
- List of islands of Japan by area
