= Japan National Route 207 =

National highway in Japan

National Route 207
- 国道207号
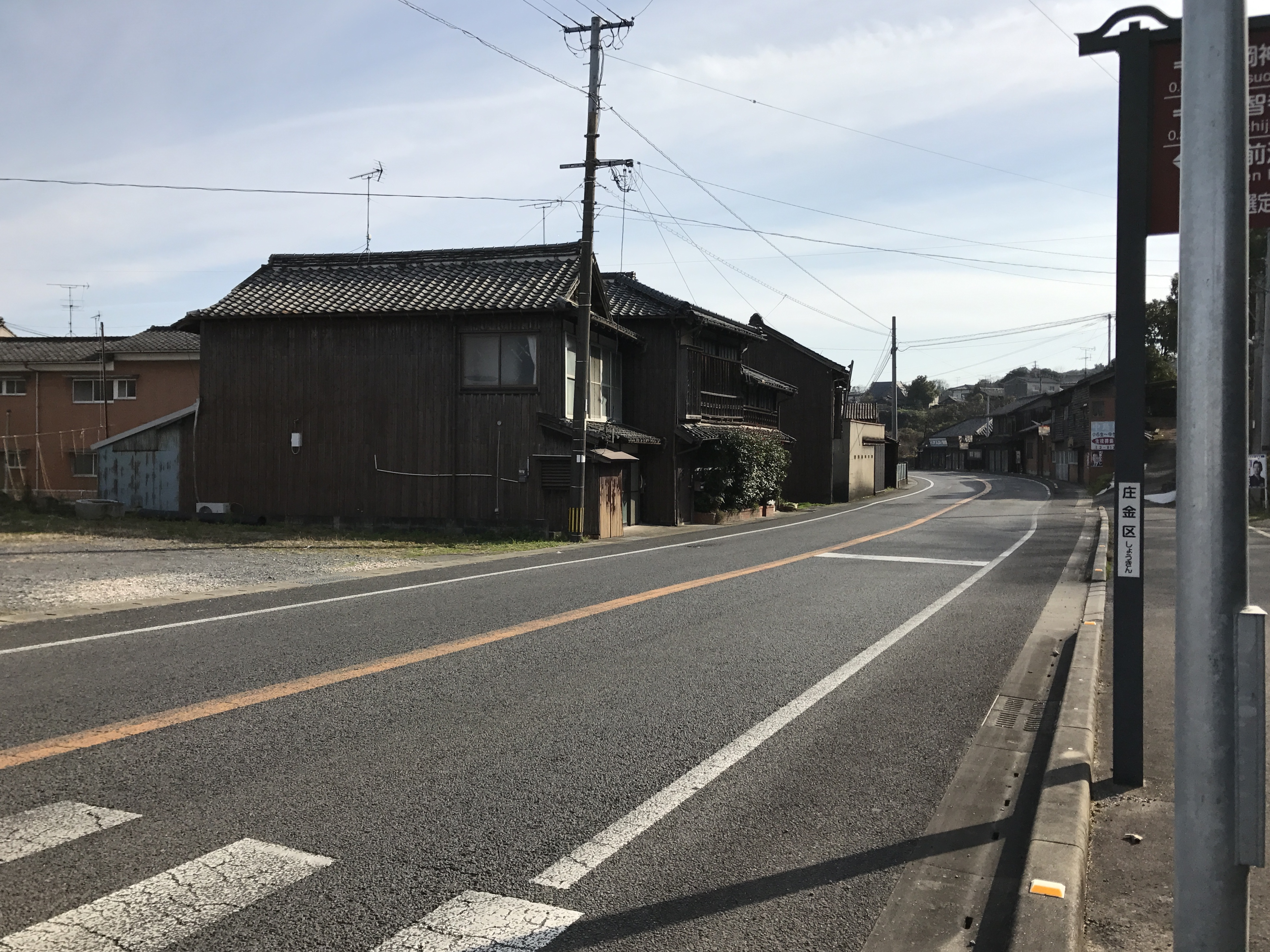

Route information
- Length: 112.3 km (69.8 mi)
- Existed: 18 May 1953–present

Major junctions
- From: National Route 264 in Saga
- To: National Route 206 in Togitsu

Location
- Country: Japan

Highway system
- National highways of Japan; Expressways of Japan
← National Route 206	→ National Route 208

National Route 207 (国道207号, Kokudō Nihyaku Nana-gō) is a highway in Japan on the island of Kyūshū which runs from Saga City in Saga Prefecture to Togitsu in Nagasaki Prefecture. From Kōhoku it runs along the Ariake Sea towards Isahaya. Hence, that portion of the road runs mostly parallel to the Nagasaki Main Line.

== Route description ==
- Length: 112.3 km (69.8 mi)
- Origin: Saga (junction with Route 264)
- Terminus: Togitsu (junction with Route 206)

== History ==
- 1953-05-28 - Second Class National Highway 207 (from Saga to Isahaya)
- 1965-04-01 - General National Highway 207 (from Saga to Isahaya)
- 1982-04-01 - General National Highway 207 (from Saga to Togitsu)

== Overlapping sections ==
- From Ogi (Maemitsue intersection) to Kōhoku (Higashibun intersection), and from Isahaya to Tarami (Kikitsu Station east entrance intersection): Route 34
- From Isahaya (Obunakoshi intersection) to Tarami (Kikitsu Station east entrance intersection): Route 57
- From Shiroishi (Ariake-chō Meguritsu intersection) to Kashima (Shimego intersection): Route 444

== Municipalities passed through ==
- Saga Prefecture
  - Saga, Kubota, Ogi, Kōhoku, Shiroishi, Kashima, Tara
- Nagasaki Prefecture
  - Isahaya, Nagayo, Togitsu

== Main connecting roads ==
- Route 208, Route 263, Route 204 (Saga)
- Route 34 (Ogi, Kōhoku, Isahaya)
- Route 444 (Shiroishi, Kashima)
- Route 498 (Kashima)
- Route 57 (Isahaya)
- Route 206 (Togitsu)

== Roadside stations ==
- Kashima Roadside Station
