= Nagayo, Nagasaki =

Nagayo 長与町
- Town
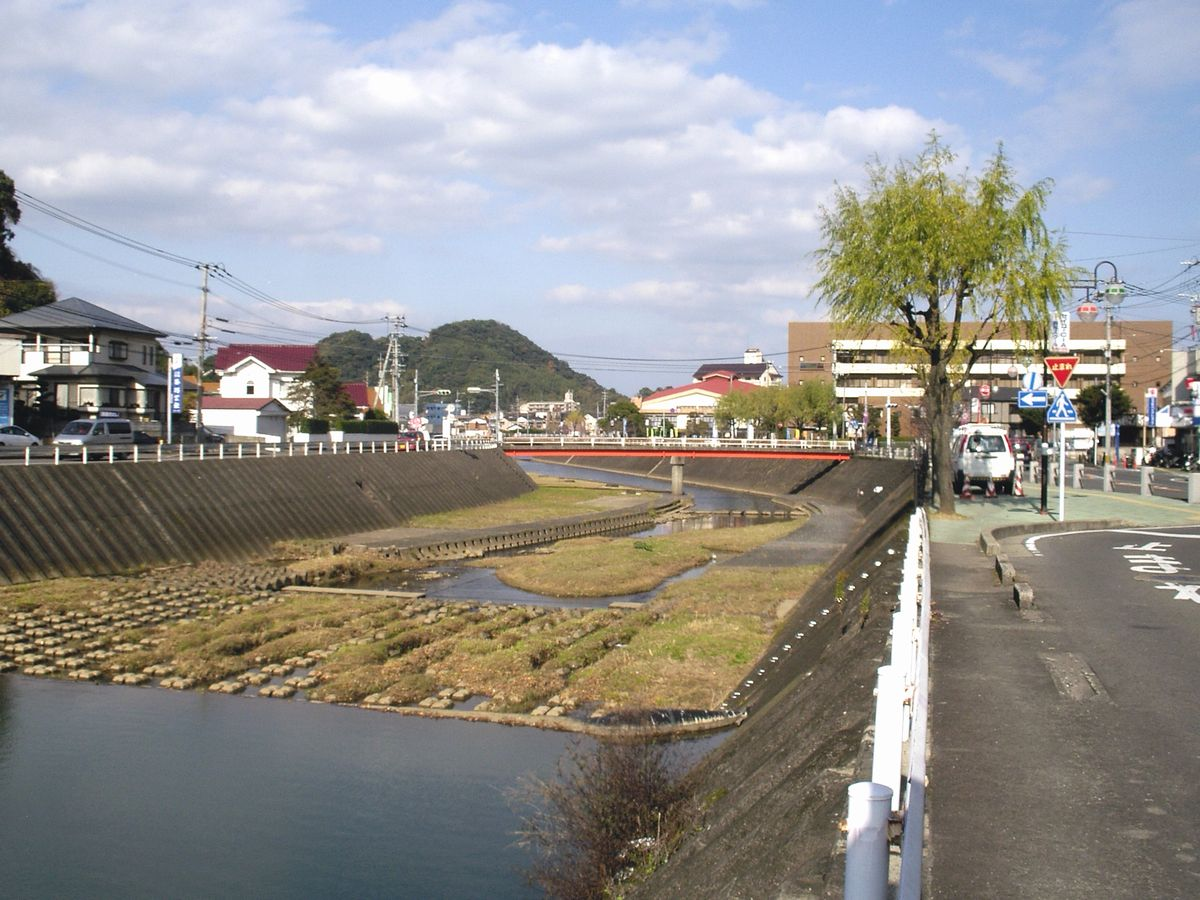
- Nagayo River

- Flag Chapter
- Location of Nagayo in Nagasaki Prefecture

- Location in Japan
- Coordinates: 32°49′31″N 129°52′31″E
- Country: Japan
- Region: Kyushu
- Prefecture: Nagasaki
- District: Nishisonogi

Area
  - Total: 28.73 km^{2} (11.09 sq mi)

Population (May 31, 2024)
  - Total: 39,548
  - Density: 1,377/km^{2} (3,565/sq mi)
- Time zone: UTC+09:00 (JST)
- Website: Official website
- Symbols
- Tree: Japanese apricot

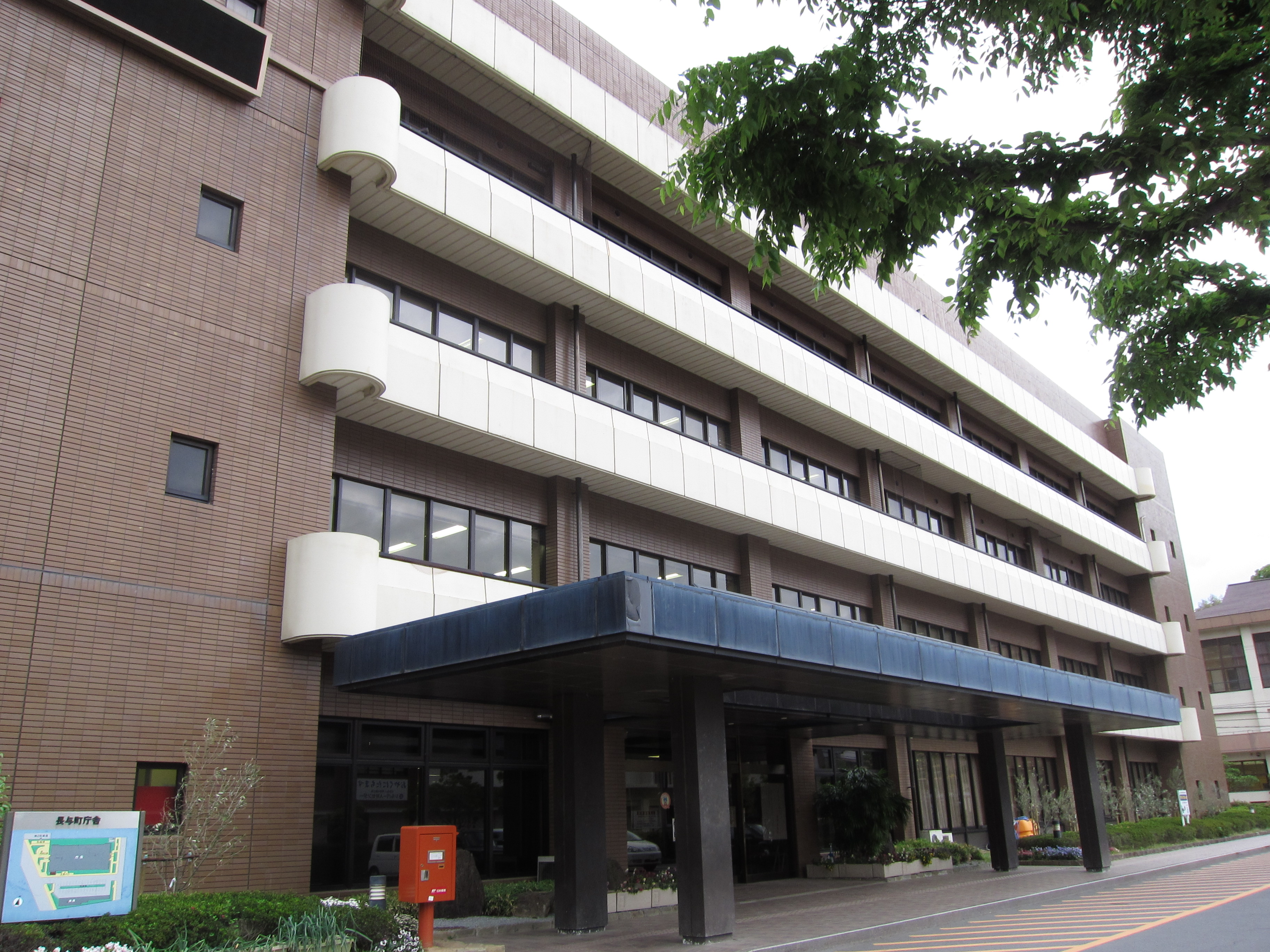
Nagayo Town Hall

Nagayo (長与町, Nagayo-chō) is a town located in Nishisonogi District, Nagasaki Prefecture, Japan. As of 31 May 2024, the town had an estimated population of 39,548 in 17077 households, and a population density of 1400 people per km^{2}. The total area of the town is 28.73 km^{2} (11.09 sq mi).

== Geography ==
Nagayo is located on the southern shore of Ōmura Bay in central Nagasaki Prefecture, and includes the uninhabited islands of Shimizu and Futatsujima. The Nagayo River flows through the center of the town, and there are many residential areas and fields in the river basin. The surrounding areas are hilly, and especially on the eastern side, there are a series of hills centered on Kotonoodake, which is 451.4 meters above sea level. The hills in the southern and western parts of the town are not as high as those in the eastern parts, and are densely populated residential areas that continue into the northern part of Nagasaki City. In the southern part of the town, the Oide River, a tributary of the Urakami River, flows along the border with Nagasaki. This was once an agriculturally thriving region, with mandarin orange fields on the hills and rice paddies along the river, but as Nagasaki's urban area expanded with new town developments in the hilly areas in the southern and western parts of the town.

=== Neighbouring municipalities ===
Nagasaki Prefecture

- Isahaya
- Togitsu

=== Climate ===
Nagayo has a humid subtropical climate (Köppen Cfa) characterized by warm summers and cool winters with light to no snowfall. The average annual temperature in Nagayo is 17.1 °C. The average annual rainfall is 2213 mm with September as the wettest month. The temperatures are highest on average in August, at around 27.0 °C, and lowest in January, at around 7.7 °C.

=== Demographics ===
Per Japanese census data, the population of Nagayo is as shown below:

Historical population
Year	Pop.	±%
1940	6,398	—
1950	10,979	+71.6%
1960	11,500	+4.7%
1970	14,008	+21.8%
1980	28,824	+105.8%
1990	33,640	+16.7%
2000	40,356	+20.0%
2010	42,535	+5.4%
2020	40,780	−4.1%

== History ==
The area of Nagayo was part of ancient Hizen Province. Stone tools from the Japanese Paleolithic dating back about 20,000 years ago have been excavated. During the Edo Period, the area was under the control of Saga Domain. After the Meiji restoration, the village of Nagayo was established with the creation of the modern municipalities system on April 1, 1889. Nagayo was raised to town status on April 1, 1969.

== Government ==
Nagayo has a mayor-council form of government with a directly elected mayor and a unicameral town council of 16 members. Nagayo, collectively with the town of Togitsu, contributes two members to the Nagasaki Prefectural Assembly. In terms of national politics, the city is part of the Nagasaki 2nd district of the lower house of the Diet of Japan.

== Economy ==
Nagayo was noted for its production of Nagayo ware pottery, which was produced until the end of the 19th century. The local economy was formerly centered on agriculture and commercial fishing; however, Nagayo is now largely a commuter town for Nagasaki.

== Education ==
Nagayo has five public elementary schools and three public junior high schools by the town government, and two public high schools operated by the Nagasaki Prefectural Board of Education.

Elementary Schools

- Araikiri Elementary School （長与町立洗切小学校）
- Koda Gakuen Yurino Campus （長与町立高田学園百合野校舎）
- Nagayo Elementary School （長与町立長与小学校）
- Nagayo Kita Elementary School （長与町立長与北小学校）
- Nagayo Minami Elementary School （長与町立長与南小学校）

Junior High Schools

- Koda Gakuen Sakurano Campus （長与町立高田学園さくら野校舎）
- Nagayo Daini Junior High School （長与町立長与第二中学校）
- Nagayo Junior High School （長与町立長与中学校）

Senior High Schools

- Hokuyodai Senior High School（長崎県立北陽台高等学校）
- Nagasaki College of Technology （長崎県立長崎高等技術専門校）

== Transportation ==
=== Railways ===
JR Kyushu - Nagasaki Main Line (branch line)

JH Honkawachi - Nagayo - Kōda - Michinoo

=== Highways ===
- National Route 207

== Sister cities ==
Wethersfield, United States, since 1999.

== Gallery ==
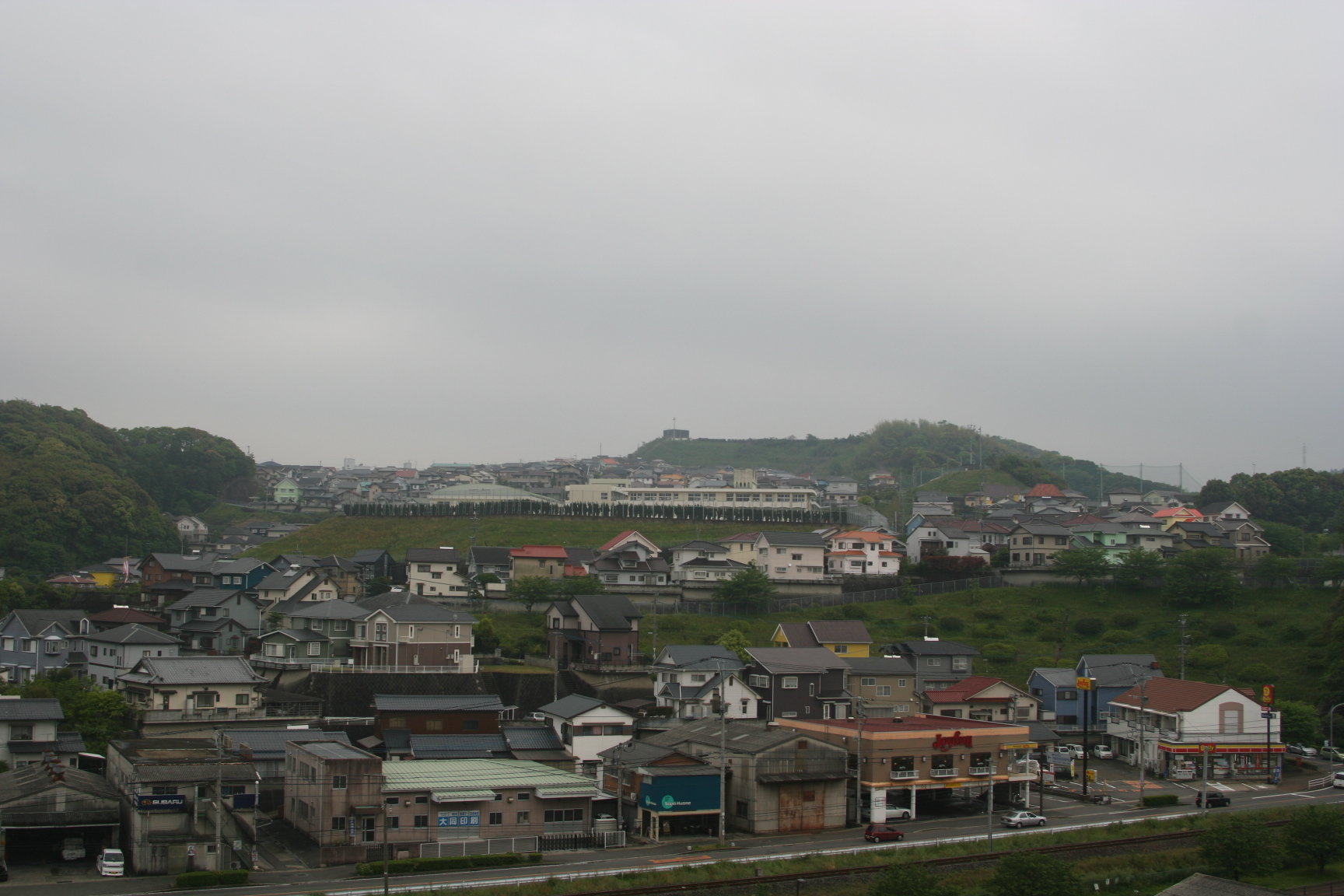

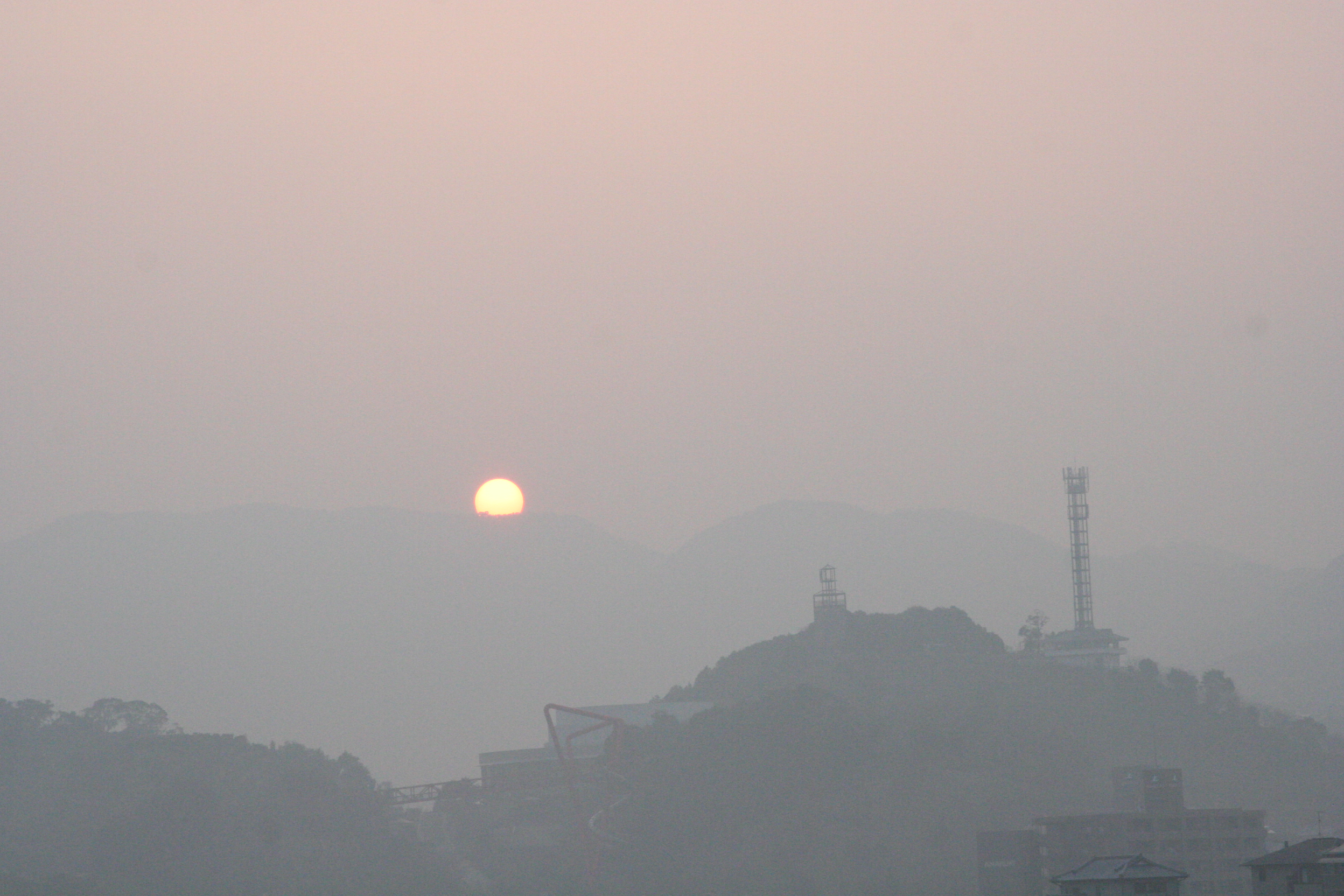

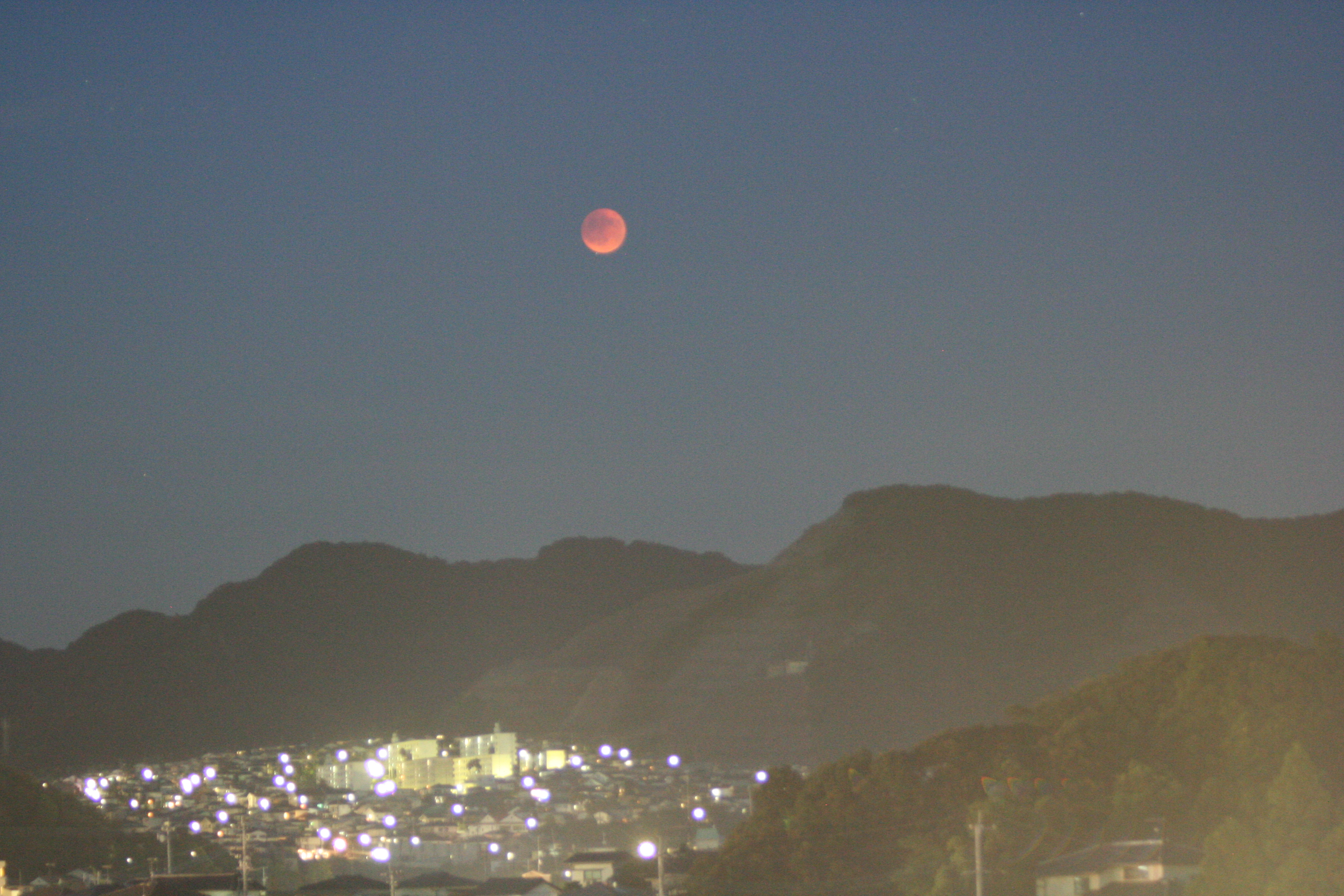
