= Togitsu, Nagasaki =

Togitsu 時津町
- Town
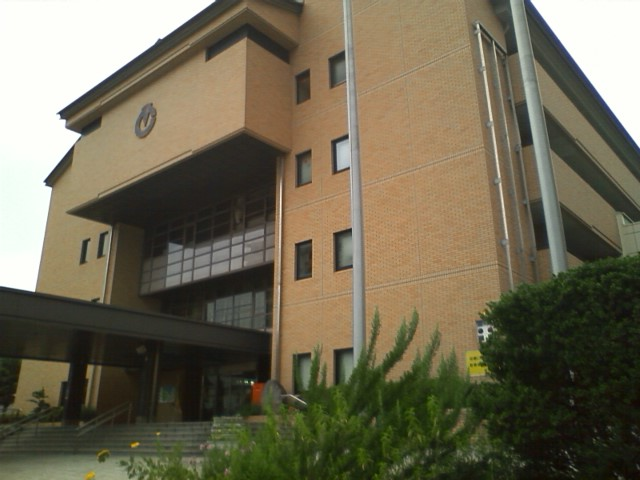
- Togitsu Town Hall

- Flag Chapter
- Location of Togitsu in Nagasaki Prefecture

- Location in Japan
- Coordinates: 32°49′44″N 129°50′55″E
- Country: Japan
- Region: Kyushu
- Prefecture: Nagasaki
- District: Nishisonogi

Area
  - Total: 20.94 km^{2} (8.08 sq mi)

Population (June 30, 2024)
  - Total: 29,323
  - Density: 1,400/km^{2} (3,627/sq mi)
- Time zone: UTC+09:00 (JST)
- City hall address: 274-1 Urago, Togitsu-cho, Nishisonogi-gun, Nagasaki-ken 851-2198
- Website: Official website
- Symbols
- Flower: Cosmos
- Tree: Camphora officinarum

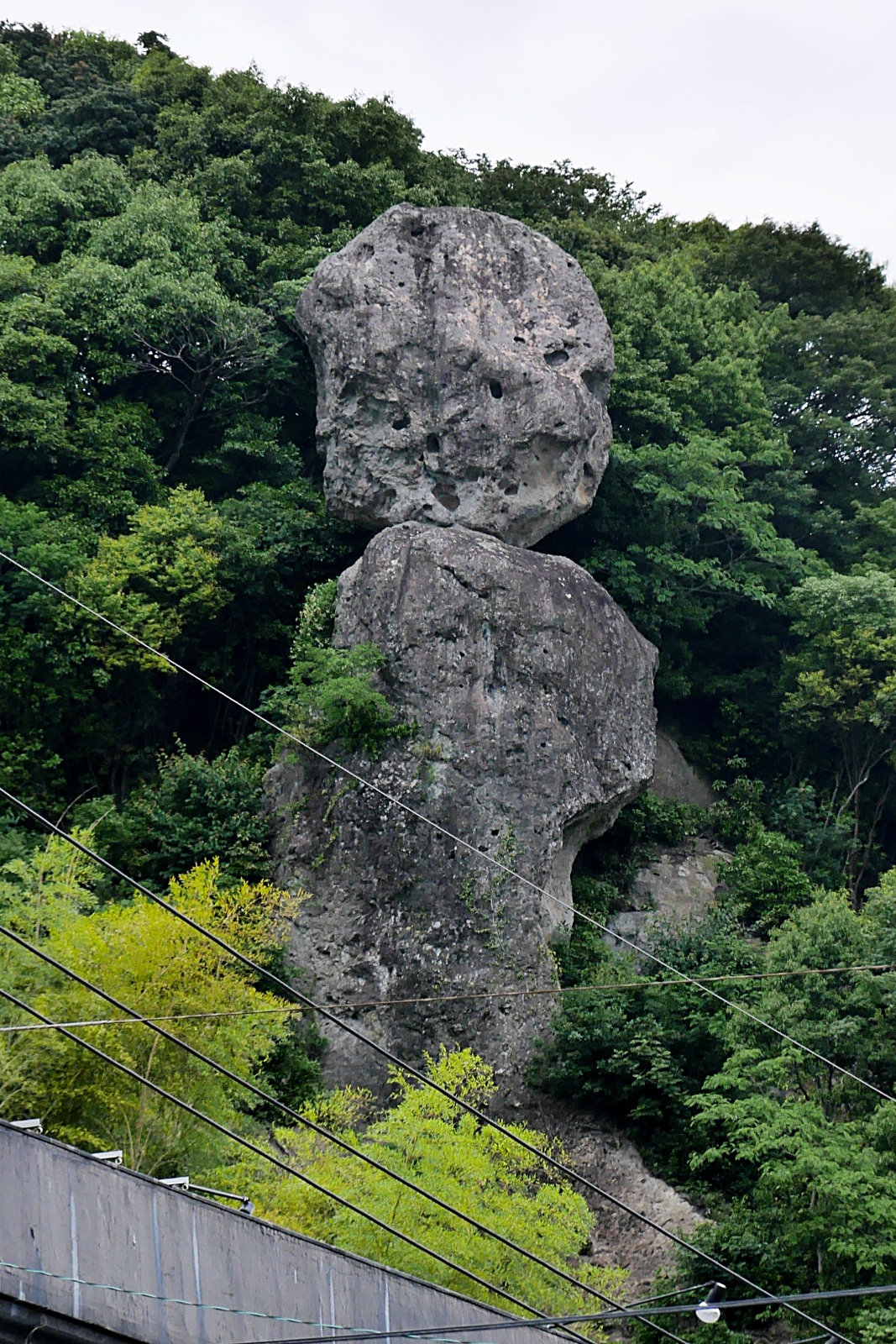
Tsugiishi Bouzu rock in Togitsu

Togitsu (時津町, Togitsu-chō) is a town located in Nishisonogi District, Nagasaki Prefecture, Japan. As of 30 June 2024, the town had an estimated population of 29,323 in 13601 households, and a population density of 1400 people per km^{2}. The total area of the town is 20.94 km^{2} (8.08 sq mi).

== Geography ==
Togitsu is located on the southwestern shore of Ōmura Bay, in the southeastern part of the Nishisonogi Peninsula. It faces Ōmura Bay to the north, and borders Nagasaki City to the south and west, and Nagayo Town, Nishisonogi County to the east. The western part of the town is a mountainous area which forms the border with Nagasaki City, but there is a plain area in the east containing the main urban center. Furthermore, the area around Togitsu Port is mostly reclaimed land and is mainly used for industrial purposes.

=== Surrounding municipalities ===
Nagasaki Prefecture

- Nagasaki
- Nagayo

=== Climate ===
Togitsu has a humid subtropical climate (Köppen Cfa) characterized by warm summers and cool winters with light to no snowfall. The average annual temperature in Togitsu is 16.9 °C. The average annual rainfall is 2128 mm with September as the wettest month. The temperatures are highest on average in August, at around 27.8 °C, and lowest in January, at around 7.6 °C.

=== Demographics ===
Per Japanese census data, the population of Togitsu is as shown below:

Historical population
Year	Pop.	±%
1960	8,768	—
1970	11,406	+30.1%
1980	20,377	+78.7%
1990	25,226	+23.8%
2000	28,065	+11.3%
2010	30,110	+7.3%
2020	29,339	−2.6%

== History ==
The area of Togitsu was part of ancient Hizen Province. During the Edo Period, the area was under the control of Ōmura Domain, and its port was a shortcut on the route to the port of Nagasaki, and was thus used by many shogunate officials and daimyo. After the Meiji restoration, the village of Togitsu was established with the creation of the modern municipalities system on April 1, 1889. Togitsu was raised to town status on December 1, 1951.

== Government ==
Togitsu has a mayor-council form of government with a directly elected mayor and a unicameral town council of 16 members. Togitsu, collectively with the town of Nagayo, contributes two members to the Nagasaki Prefectural Assembly. In terms of national politics, the town is part of the Nagasaki 2nd district of the lower house of the Diet of Japan.

== Economy ==
Togitsu is unusual in Nagasaki in that it is more active in industry and commerce than agriculture and fishing. It is home to Mitsubishi Electric's Nagasaki Works, which is the major employer. Due it its location, a large number of residents commute to Nagasaki for work.

== Education ==
Tokitsu has four public elementary schools and two public junior high schools by the town government. The town does not have a public high school but there are one private junior high school and one private high school.

== Transportation ==
=== Railways ===
Togitsu does not have any passenger railway services. The nearest stations are JR Kyushu Nagasaki Main Line Michinoo Station (Hayama, Nagasaki City) and Nagayo Station (Nagayo Town).

=== Highways ===
- National Route 206
- National Route 207
