= Nagayo ware =

Type of Japanese pottery

Nagayo ware (長与焼, Nagayo-yaki) refers to a type of Japanese pottery produced in the region around the towns of Nagayo in Nagasaki Prefecture, western Japan.

Nagayo ware has links to Kameyama ware. During the Edo period, a number of high-quality ceramic vessels were produced that employed the sancai (三彩; literally: "three colours") type of decoration, which mainly used, but was not limited to, the three colors of brown, green, and a creamy off-white.
