= Oriental Air Bridge =

Japanese airline

Oriental Air Bridge Co., Ltd. オリエンタルエアブリッジ株式会社
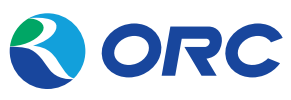

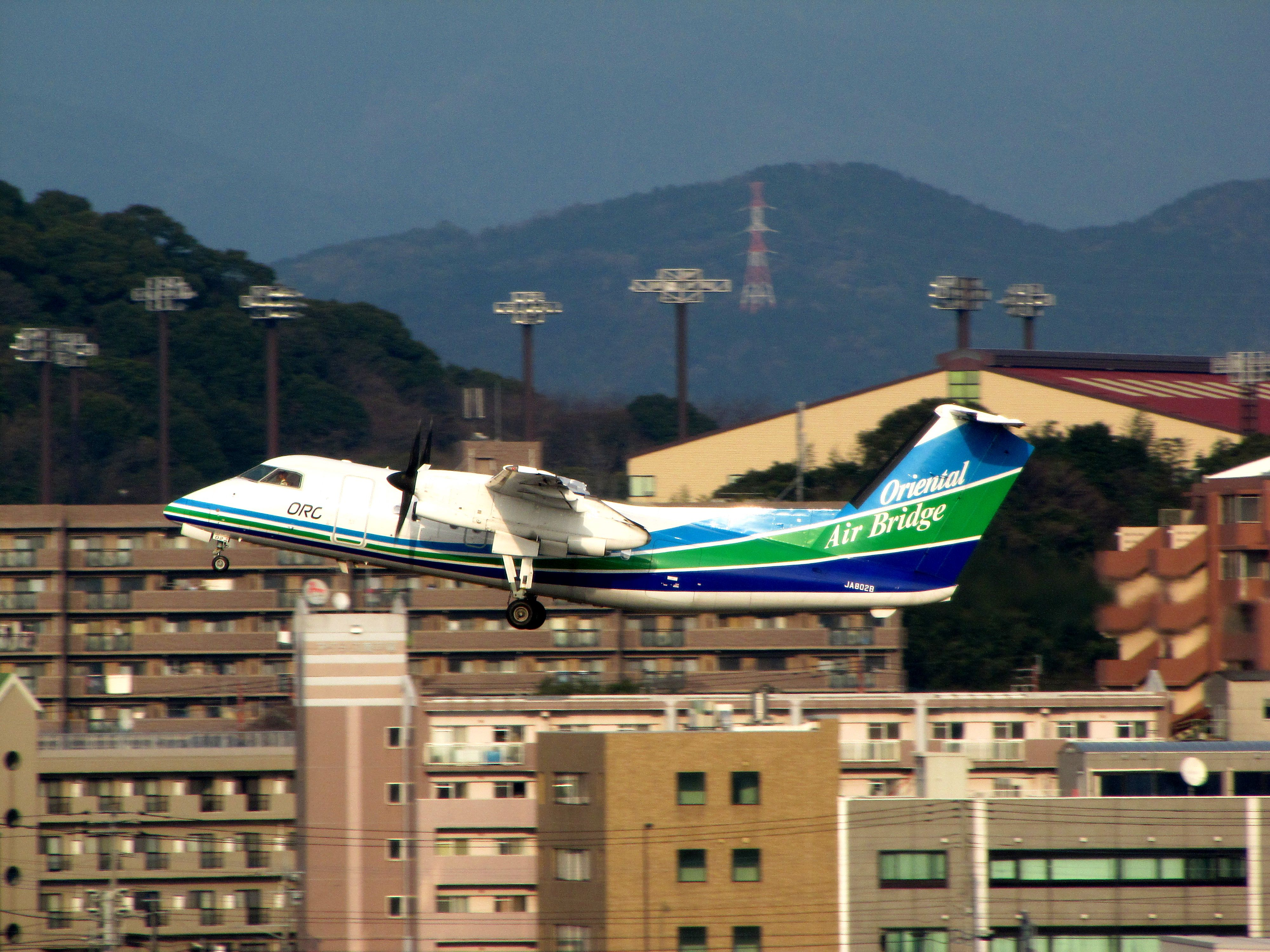
IATA	ICAO	Call sign
OC	ORC	ORIENTAL BRIDGE
- Founded: 21 June 1961; 65 years ago (as Nagasaki Airways)
- Hubs: Nagasaki Airport
- Fleet size: 2
- Destinations: 12
- Headquarters: Ōmura, Nagasaki Prefecture
- Key people: Tsunakuni Ōhitogata (CEO)
- Website: orc-air.co.jp

Oriental Air Bridge Co., Ltd. (オリエンタルエアブリッジ株式会社, Orientaru Ea Burijji Kabushiki-gaisha) is a Japanese regional airline headquartered on the grounds of Nagasaki Airport in Ōmura, Nagasaki Prefecture, Japan. It operates regional services to the islands within Nagasaki Prefecture and also operates domestic services from Fukuoka and Nagoya with ANA Wings aircraft.

== History ==
The airline was established on June 12, 1961 as Nagasaki Airways. It was renamed Oriental Air Bridge in March 2001.

In late 2022, ORC received its first of two ATR 42-600 which are scheduled to replace their Bombardier Dash 8 Q200 fleet.

== Destinations ==
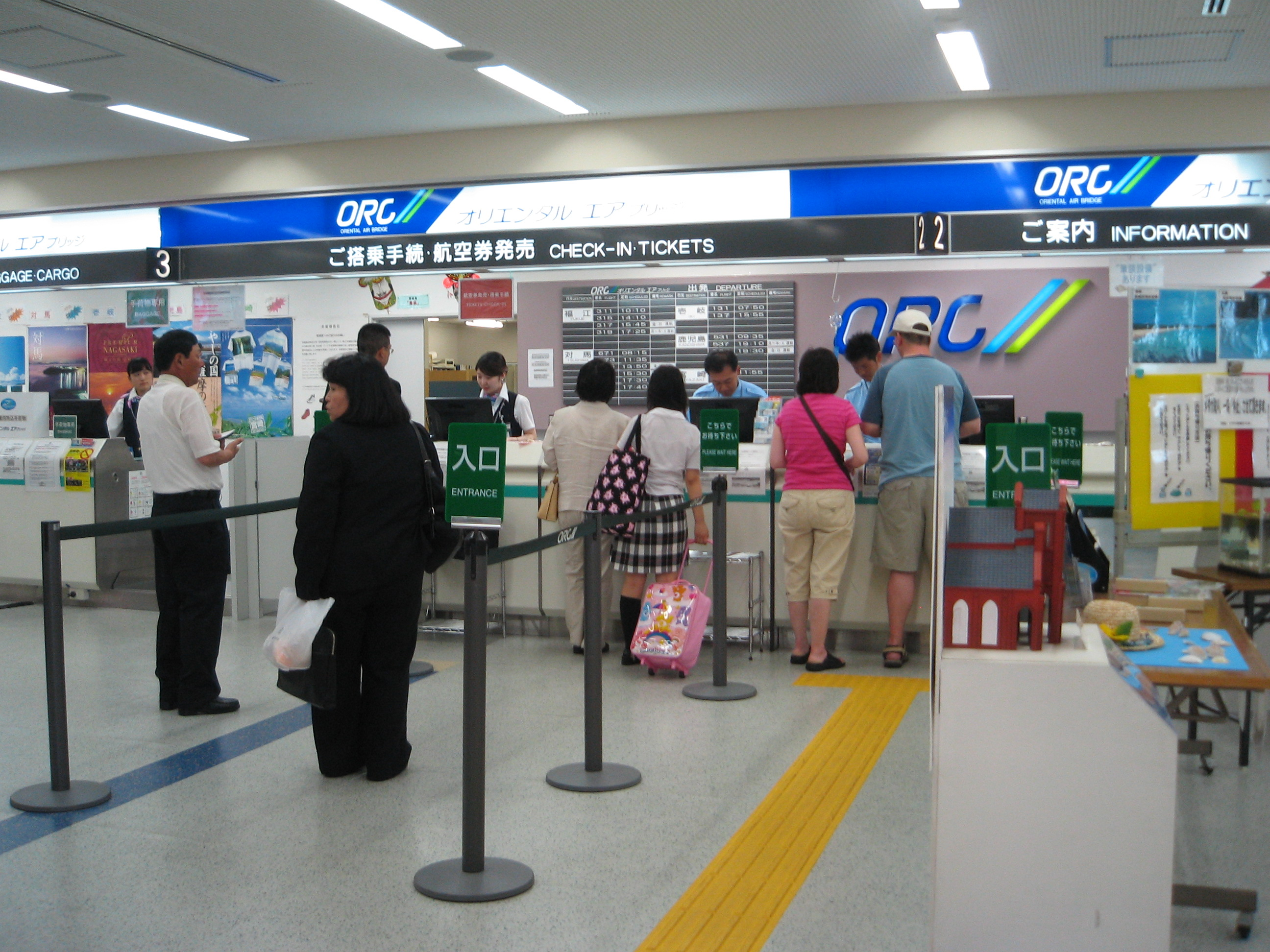
The Oriental Air Bridge check-in desk at Nagasaki Airport.

Oriental Air Bridge serves the following destinations (as of January 2023):

Country	Island	City	Airport	Notes	Refs
Japan	Honshu	Akita	Akita Airport		
Japan	Kyushu	Fukuoka	Fukuoka Airport		
Japan	Kyushu	Gotō	Fukue Airport		
Japan	Kyushu	Iki	Iki Airport		
Japan	Honshu	Komatsu	Komatsu Airport		
Japan	Kyushu	Miyazaki	Miyazaki Airport		
Japan	Shikoku	Matsuyama	Matsuyama Airport		
Japan	Kyushu	Nagasaki	Nagasaki Airport	Hub	
Japan	Honshu	Nagoya	Nagoya–Centrair		
Japan	Tsushima	Tsushima	Tsushima Airport		

=== Codeshare agreements ===
Oriental Air Bridge has codeshare agreements with the following airlines:

- All Nippon Airways
- Japan Airlines

== Fleet ==
=== Current fleet ===
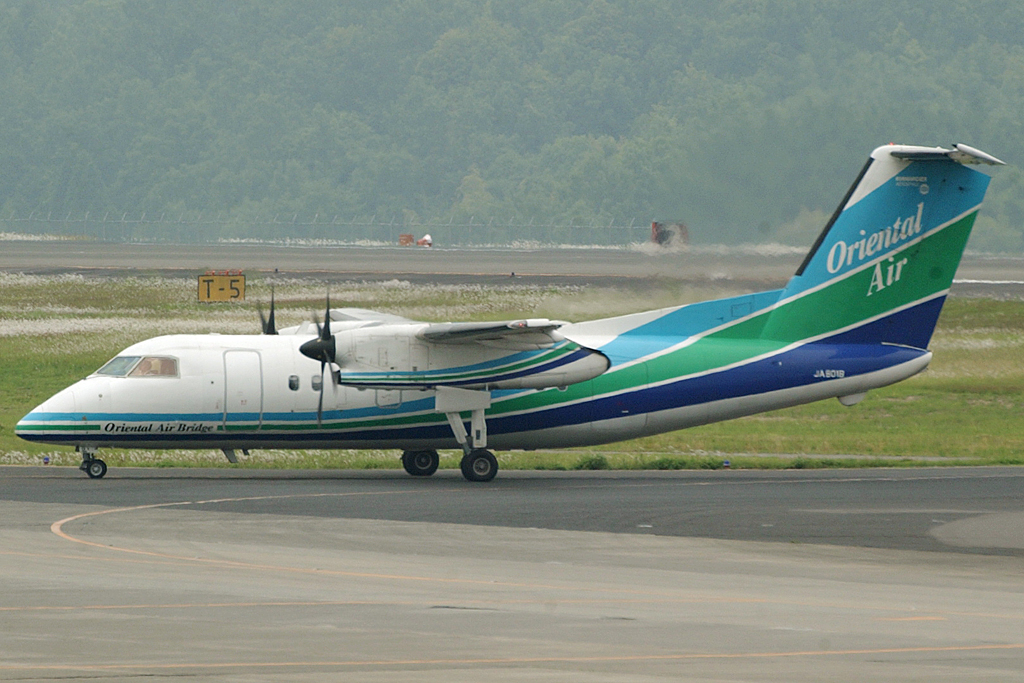
Oriental Air Bridge Bombardier Dash 8 Q200

As of July 2026, Oriental Air Bridge operates the following aircraft:

Oriental Air Bridge Fleet
Aircraft	In Fleet	Orders	Passengers	Notes
ATR 42-600	2	—	48	
Total	2	—		

=== Former fleet ===
As of August 2025, Oriental Air Bridge operated 2 ATR 72-600.

Oriental Air Bridge has also operated the following aircraft types in the past:

- Bombardier Dash 8 Q100
- Bombardier Dash 8 Q200
- 4 Bombardier Dash 8 Q400
- Britten-Norman BN2B-20 Islander
