= Ōmura Bay =

Bay in Nagasaki, Japan

- 大村湾 (Japanese)
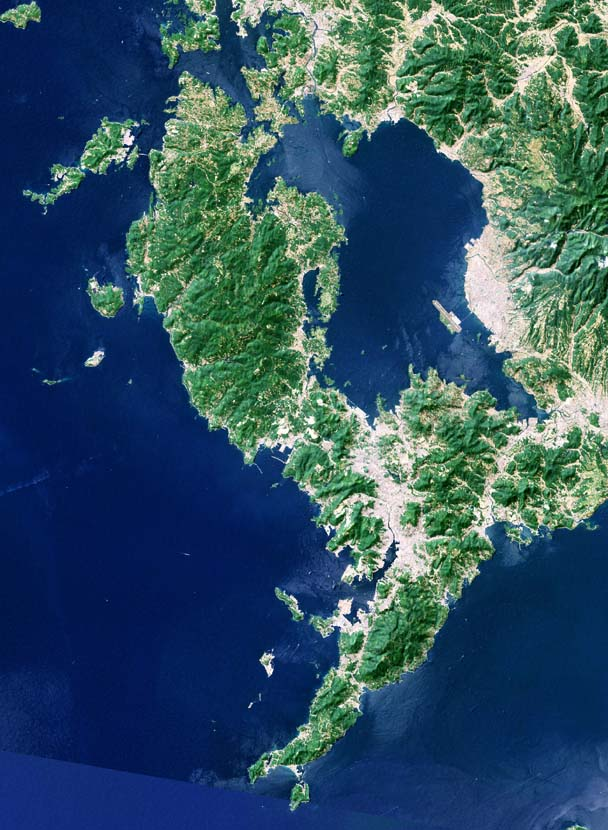
- Landsat image of the Ōmura Bay

- Location within Nagasaki Prefecture
- Location: Nagasaki Prefecture
- Coordinates: 32.95°N 129.875°E
- Ocean/sea sources: East China Sea
- Basin countries: Japan
- Max. length: 26 km (16 mi)
- Max. width: 11 km (6.8 mi)
- Surface area: 320 km^{2} (120 mi^{2})
- Average depth: 15 m (49 ft)
- Max. depth: 55 m (180 ft)
- Shore length^{1}: 360 km (220 mi)
- Settlements: Nagasaki
- ^{1} Shore length is not a well-defined measure.

Ōmura Bay (大村湾, Ōmura-wan) is a bay located in the center of Nagasaki Prefecture, Japan in the East China Sea.

== Geography ==
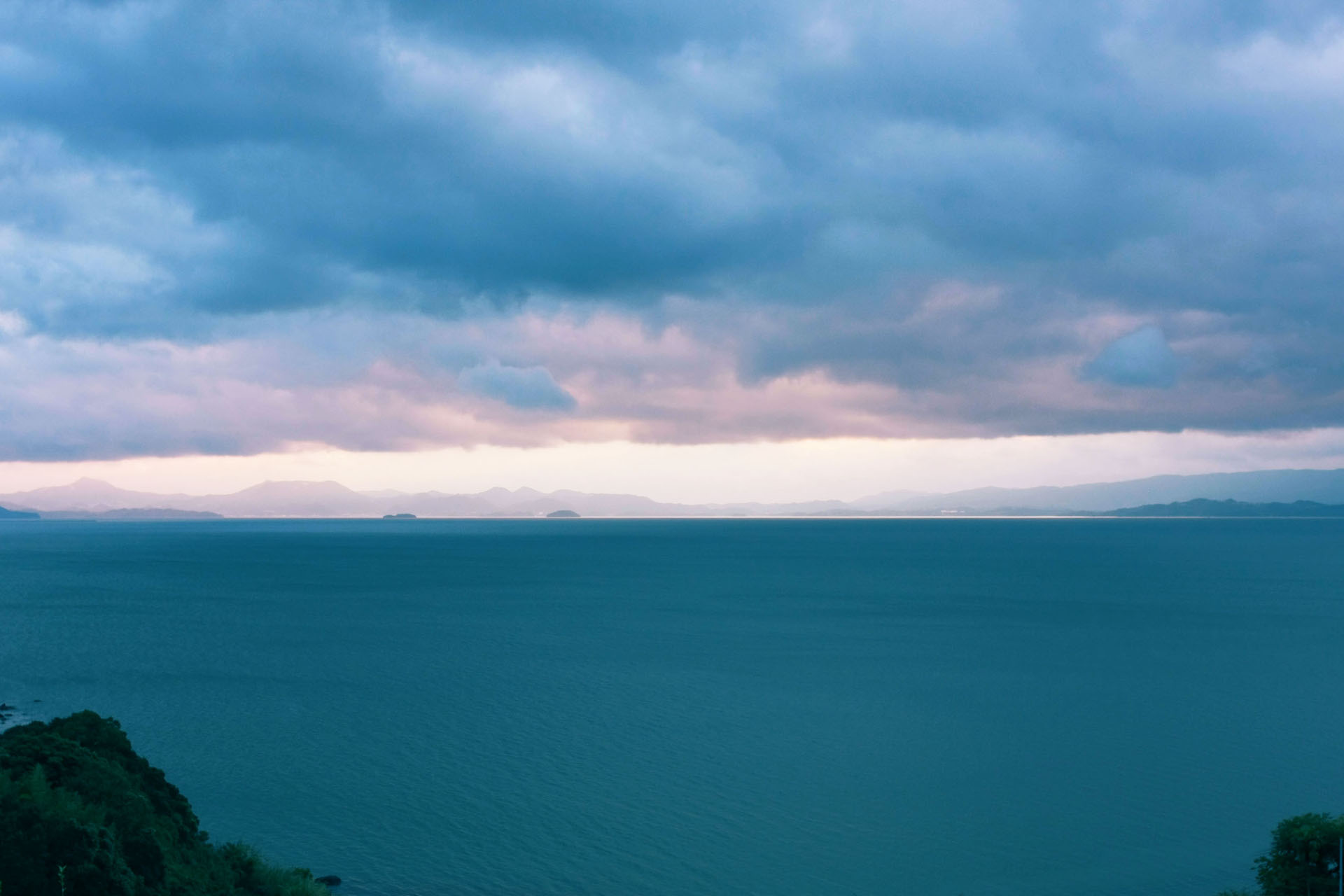
Vista on Ōmura Bay.

The bay measures about 26 km (16 mi) north-to-south and 11 km (6.8 mi) east-to-west. The length of the shoreline is about 360 km (220 mi) and the surface area is about 320 km^{2} (120 mi^{2}). This corresponds with about 8% of the total area of the prefecture. Compared to its size, the bay is relatively shallow with an average depth of 15 m (49 ft) and maximum 55 m (180 ft) depth.

The bay is surrounded by land in all directions, thus it appears as an inland sea on maps. The only two connections to the East China Sea are in the north-west: the Hario Strait (針尾瀬戸, Hario-seto) with a minimum width of 200 m (660 ft) and – more eastward – the Haiki Strait (早岐瀬戸, Haiki-seto) with a width of 10 to 200 m (33 to 656 ft). However, these two straits do not directly lead to the open sea, but to the Sasebo Bay (佐世保湾, Sasebo-wan). In between the Hario and Haiki Straits lies Hario Island. West of the Ōmura Bay lies the Nishisonogi Peninsula (西彼杵半島, Nishisonogi-hantō), and to the south is the foot of Mount Kotonoo (琴ノ尾岳, Kotonoo-dake). On the eastern shore of the bay is the Ōmura Plain (大村平野, Ōmura-heiya), on which the city of Ōmura is located. Opposite Ōmura city lies the largest island of the bay: Mishima (箕島), where Nagasaki Airport is located. For this purpose, the island first had to be flattened and reshaped.

Along the bay shore lie the following towns, clockwise from the north: Sasebo, Kawatana, Higashisonogi, Ōmura, Isahaya, Nagayo, Togitsu, Nagasaki and Saikai.

== Biology ==
Because of the geography of the bay there is only a small exchange of water from the bay with the sea. Consequently, the marine life in the bay is different from that in the nearby sea. The bay houses a rare species of finless porpoise, which does not leave the bay during its lifetime. Indo-Pacific bottlenose dolphins and common dolphins may migrate into the basin on unclear regularities. Another special inhabitant – sometimes characterised as a living fossil – is the horseshoe crab species Tachypleus tridentatus. Despite being nearly separated from the sea, and the large cities along its shore, the bay is full of fish. About 60 species of marine animals are fished.
