= Japan National Route 206 =

National highway in Japan

National Route 206
- 国道206号
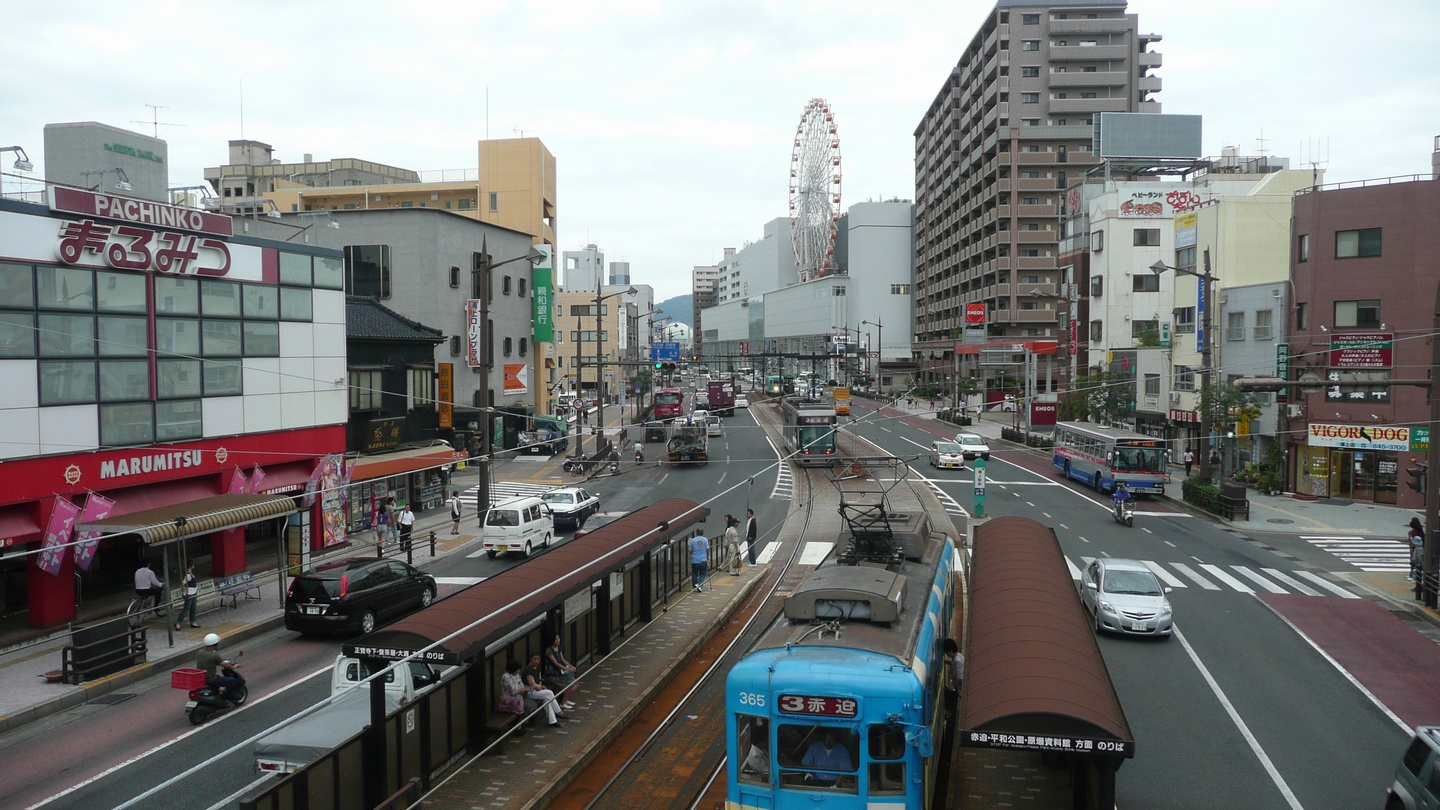

Route information
- Length: 72.6 km (45.1 mi)
- Existed: 18 May 1953–present

Major junctions
- North end: National Route 202 in Sasebo
- South end: National Route 34 / National Route 324 in Nagasaki

Location
- Country: Japan

Highway system
- National highways of Japan; Expressways of Japan
← National Route 205	→ National Route 207

National Route 206 is a national highway of Japan connecting Nagasaki and Sasebo in Japan, with a total length of 72.6 km (45.11 mi).
