= Tsushima Airport =

Tsushima Airport 対馬空港
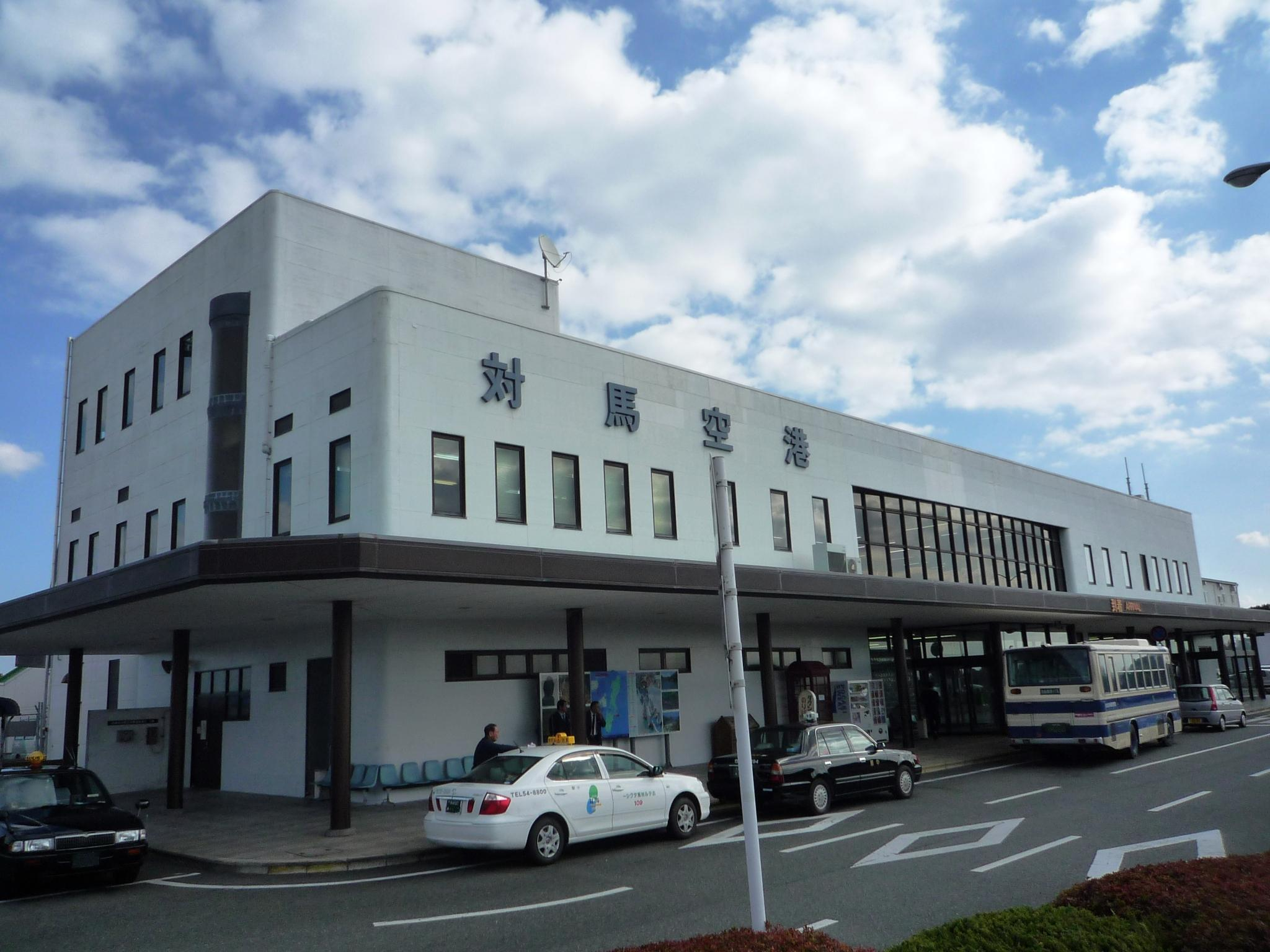
- IATA: TSJ; ICAO: RJDT

Summary
- Airport type: Public
- Operator: Nagasaki Prefecture (airfield); Tsushima Airport Terminal Building Co., Ltd. (terminal)
- Serves: Tsushima, Japan
- Elevation AMSL: 207 ft / 63 m
- Coordinates: 34°17′06″N 129°19′50″E

Map
- Location in Japan RJDT (Japan)

Runways
Direction	Length		Surface
Direction	m	ft	Surface
14/32	1,900	6,234	Asphalt concrete

Statistics (2015)
- Passengers: 250,194
- Cargo (metric tonnes): 333
- Aircraft movement: 6,075
- Source: Japanese Ministry of Land, Infrastructure, Transport and Tourism

Tsushima Airport (対馬空港) (IATA: TSJ, ICAO: RJDT) is an airport located 10 km (6.2 mi) northeast Tsushima, a city in the Nagasaki Prefecture of Japan. It is also known as Tsushima Yamaneko Airport (対馬やまねこ空港).

== History ==
The airport opened in 1975 on a site created by leveling a small mountain.

In 2003, a small propeller training aircraft used by Sojo University crashed on approach to Tsushima, killing three occupants.

Oriental Air Bridge operates scheduled flights to and from the airport using its fleet of ATR 42 and Bombardier Dash 8 aircraft with flights to Fukuoka and Nagasaki. The airport has also been served by Korea Express Air turboprop service from Seoul Gimpo and Daegu in the past.

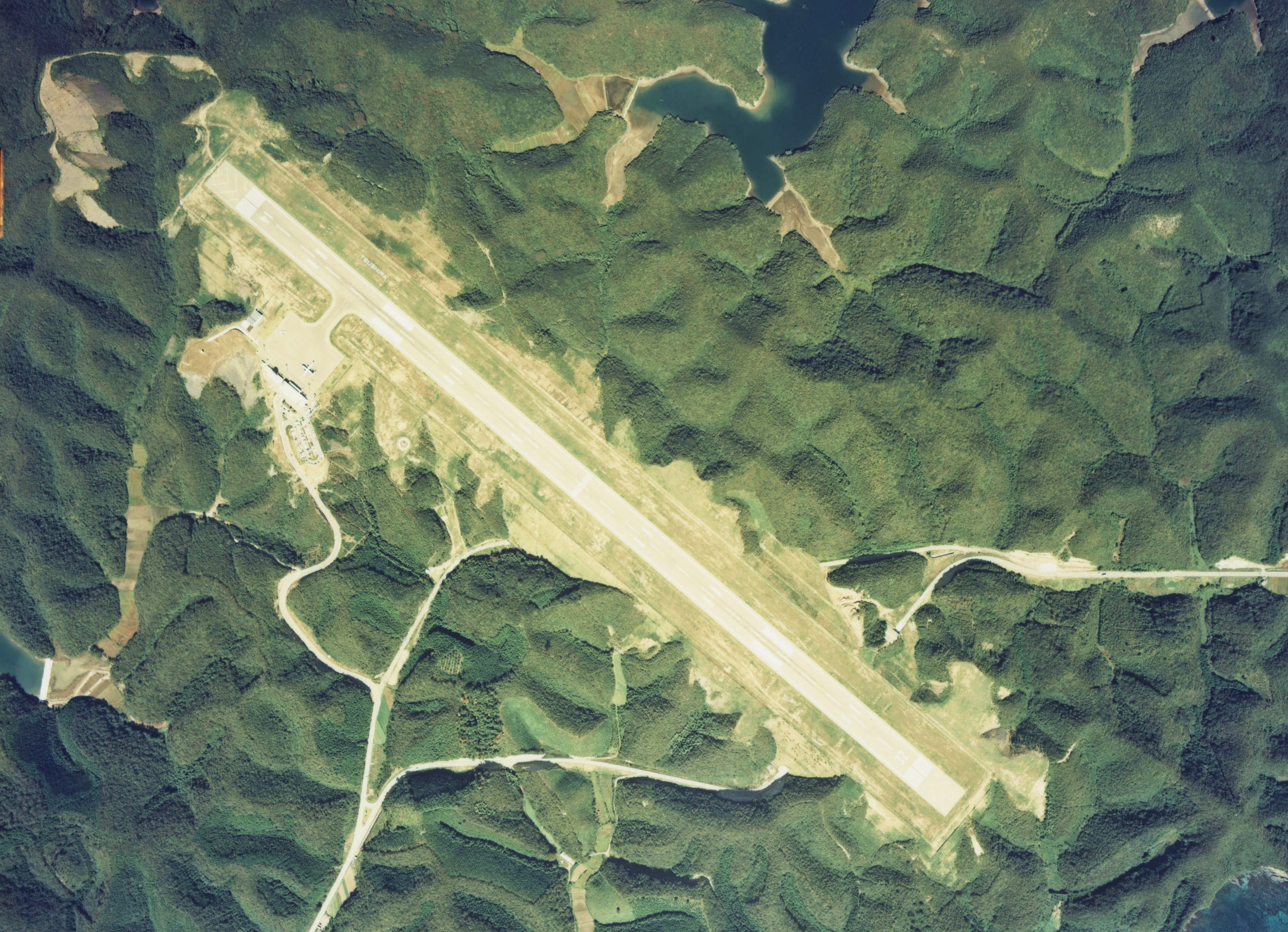
Aerial photo of Tsushima airport

== Airlines and destinations ==
Airlines	Destinations
Oriental Air Bridge	Fukuoka, Nagasaki
