= Hizen-Iida Station =

Railway station in Kashima, Saga Prefecture, Japan

Hizen-Iida Station 肥前飯田駅
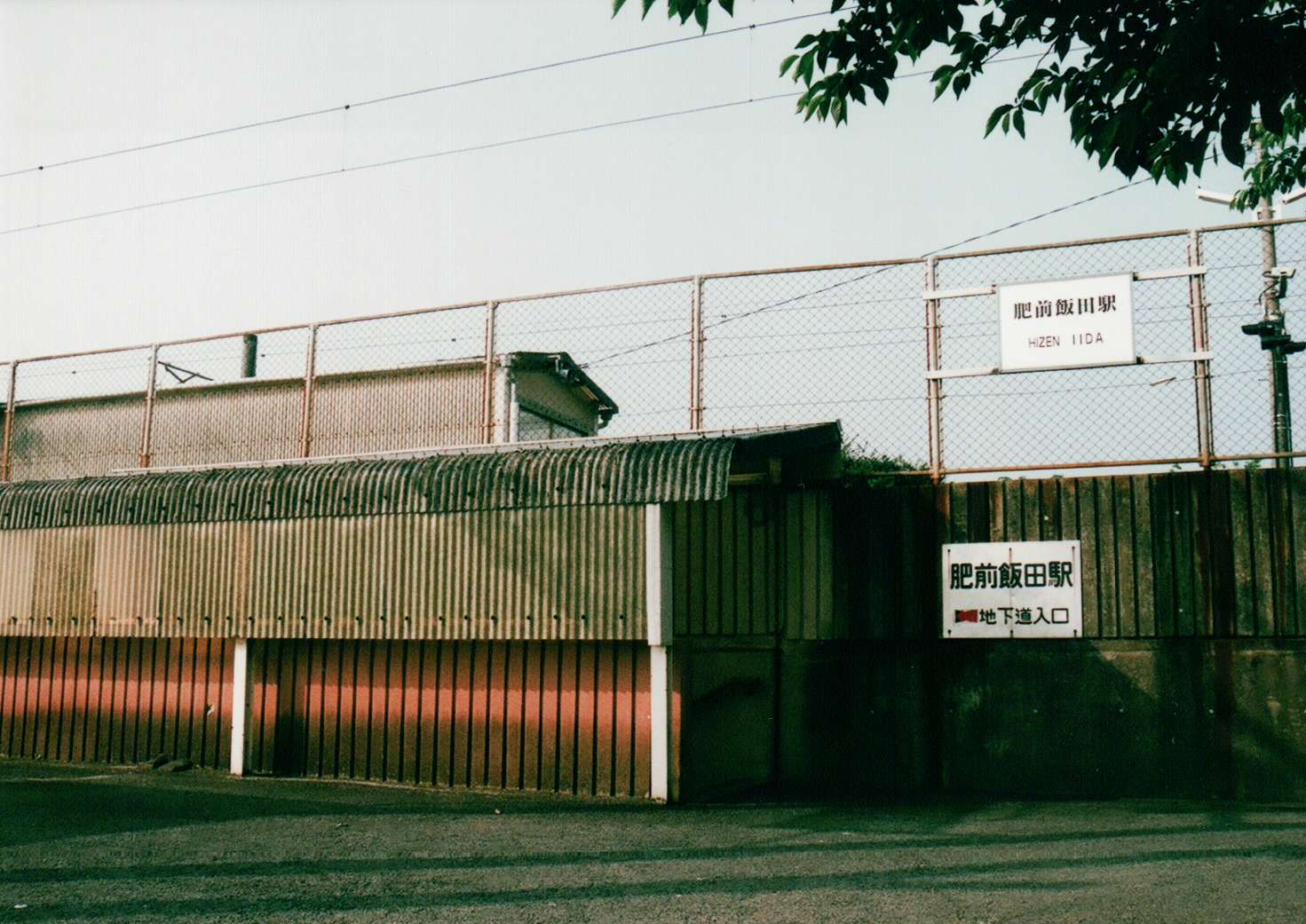
- Hizen-Iida Station in 2010

General information
- Location: Iida, Kashima-shi, Saga-ken 849-1324; Japan
- Coordinates: 33°03′21″N 130°09′32″E
- Operator: JR Kyushu
- Line: JH Nagasaki Main Line
- Distance: 63.6 km from Tosu
- Platforms: 1 island platform
- Tracks: 2

Construction
- Structure type: Embankment
- Cycle facilities: Bike shed
- Accessible: No - access to platform by underpass with steps

Other information
- Status: Unstaffed
- Website: Official website

History
- Opened: 16 April 1934

Passengers
- FY2016: 48 daily

Services
Preceding station	JR Kyushu	Following station
Tara towards Nagasaki	Nagasaki Line	Hizen-Nanaura towards Tosu
Location
- Location within Saga Prefecture Location within Japan

Hizen-Iida Station (肥前飯田駅, Hizeniida-eki) is a passenger railway station located in the city of Kashima, Saga Prefecture, Japan. It is operated by JR Kyushu.

== Lines ==
The station is served by the Nagasaki Main Line and is located 63.6 km from the starting point of the line at Tosu.

== Station layout ==
The station consists of an island platform serving two tracks on an embankment. There is no station building. From the access road, an underpass leads, through the embankment, to the platform. An enclosed shelter has been built over the underpass opening on the platform as a waiting room for passengers. A bike shed is located at the base of the embankment near the entrance to the underpass.

=== Platforms ===
1	■ JH Nagasaki Main Line	for Saga and Tosu
2	■ JH Nagasaki Main Line	for Nagasaki

== History ==
Japanese Government Railways (JGR) built the station in the 1930s during the development of an alternative route for the Nagasaki Main Line along the coast of the Ariake Sea which was at first known as the Ariake Line. The track was built from Hizen-Yamaguchi to Hizen-Ryūō, opening on 9 March 1930, and then to Hizen-Hama, opening on 30 November 1930. In the next phase of expansion, the track was extended to Tara which opened on 16 April 1934 as the new southern terminus. Hizen-Iida was opened on the same day as an intermediate station along the new stretch of track. On 1 December 1934, the entire route was completed and through-traffic achieved from Hizen-Yamaguchi through the station to Nagasaki. The track was then redesignated as part of the Nagasaki Main Line. With the privatization of Japanese National Railways (JNR), the successor of JGR, on 1 April 1987, control of the station passed to JR Kyushu.

== Surrounding area ==
- Japan National Route 207

== See also ==
- List of railway stations in Japan
