= Hizen-Nanaura Station =

Railway station in Kashima, Saga Prefecture, Japan

Hizen-Nanaura Station 肥前七浦駅
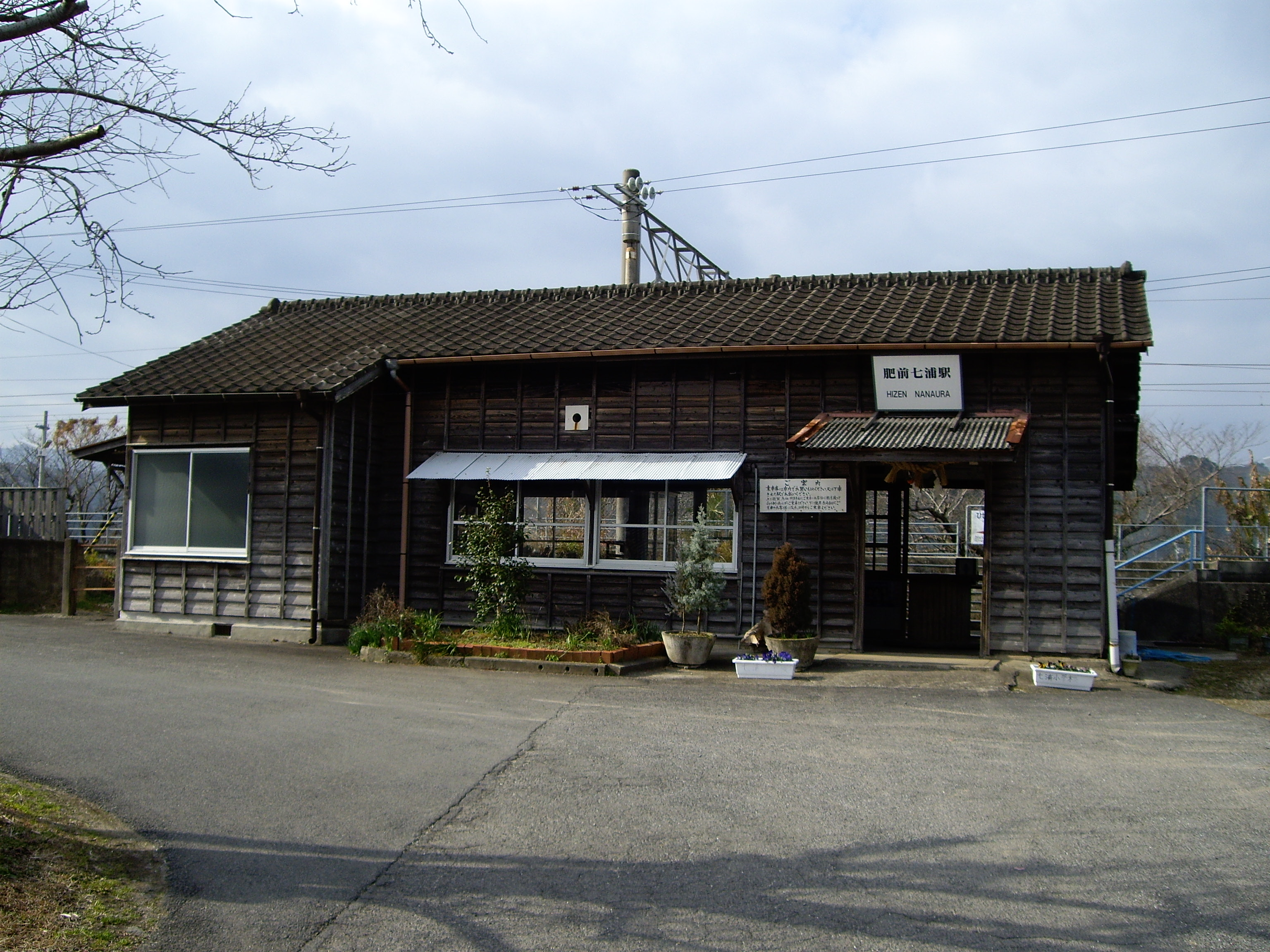
- Hizen-Nanaura Station in 2008

General information
- Location: Otonari, Kashima-shi, Saga-ken 849-1323; Japan
- Coordinates: 33°04′16″N 130°08′43″E
- Operator: JR Kyushu
- Line: JH Nagasaki Main Line
- Distance: 61.5 km from Tosu
- Platforms: 2 side platforms
- Tracks: 2 + 1 siding

Construction
- Structure type: At grade
- Accessible: No - platforms linked by footbridge

Other information
- Status: Unstaffed
- Website: Official website

History
- Opened: 16 April 1934

Passengers
- FY2016: 47 daily

Services
Preceding station	JR Kyushu	Following station
Hizen-Hama towards Nagasaki	Nagasaki Line	Hizen-Iida towards Tosu
Location
- Location within Saga Prefecture Location within Japan

Hizen-Nanaura Station (肥前七浦駅, Hizennanaura-eki) is a passenger railway station in located in the city of Kashima, Saga Prefecture, Japan. It is operated by JR Kyushu.

== Lines ==
The station is served by the Nagasaki Main Line and is located 61.5 km from the starting point of the line at Tosu.

== Station layout ==
The station consists of two side platforms serving two tracks. Track 1 is a through-track while track 2 is a passing loop. A siding branches off track 1. The station building is built in Japanese-style in timber with a tiled roof. It is unstaffed and serves only as a waiting room. Access to the opposite side platform is by means of a footbridge.

=== Platforms ===
1	■ JH Nagasaki Main Line	for Nagasaki
2	■ JH Nagasaki Main Line	for Saga and Tosu

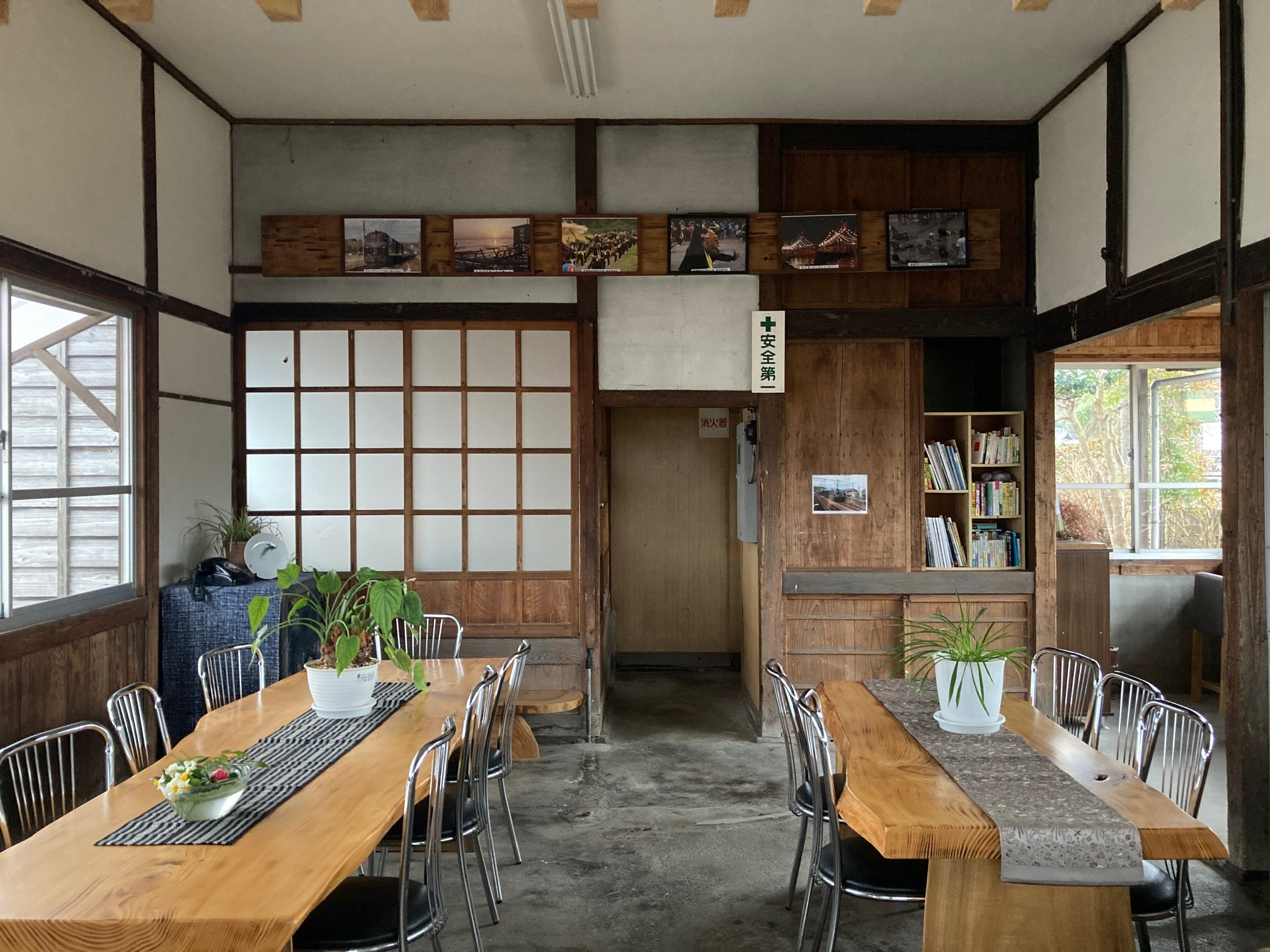
Waiting room

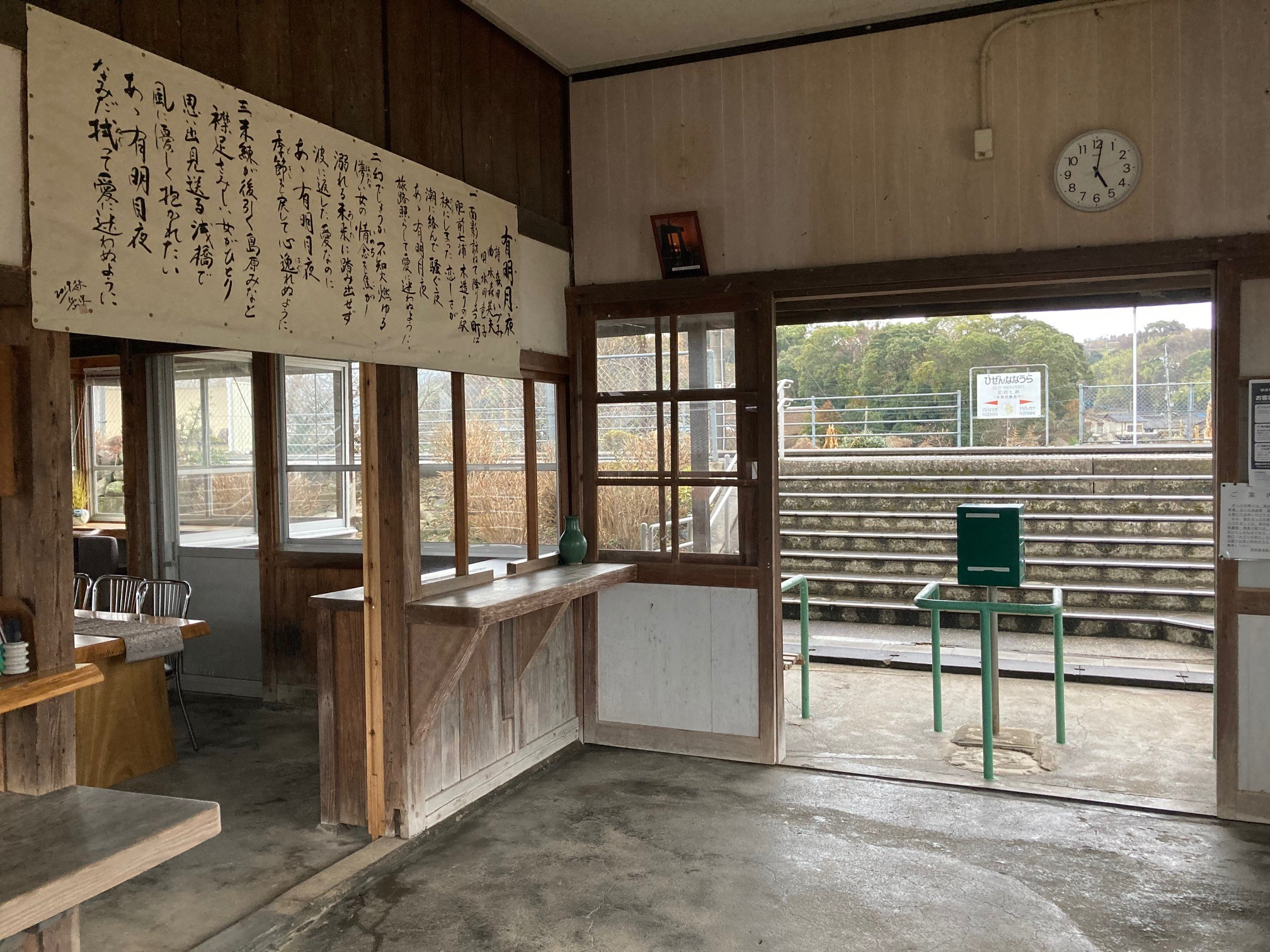
Wicket gates

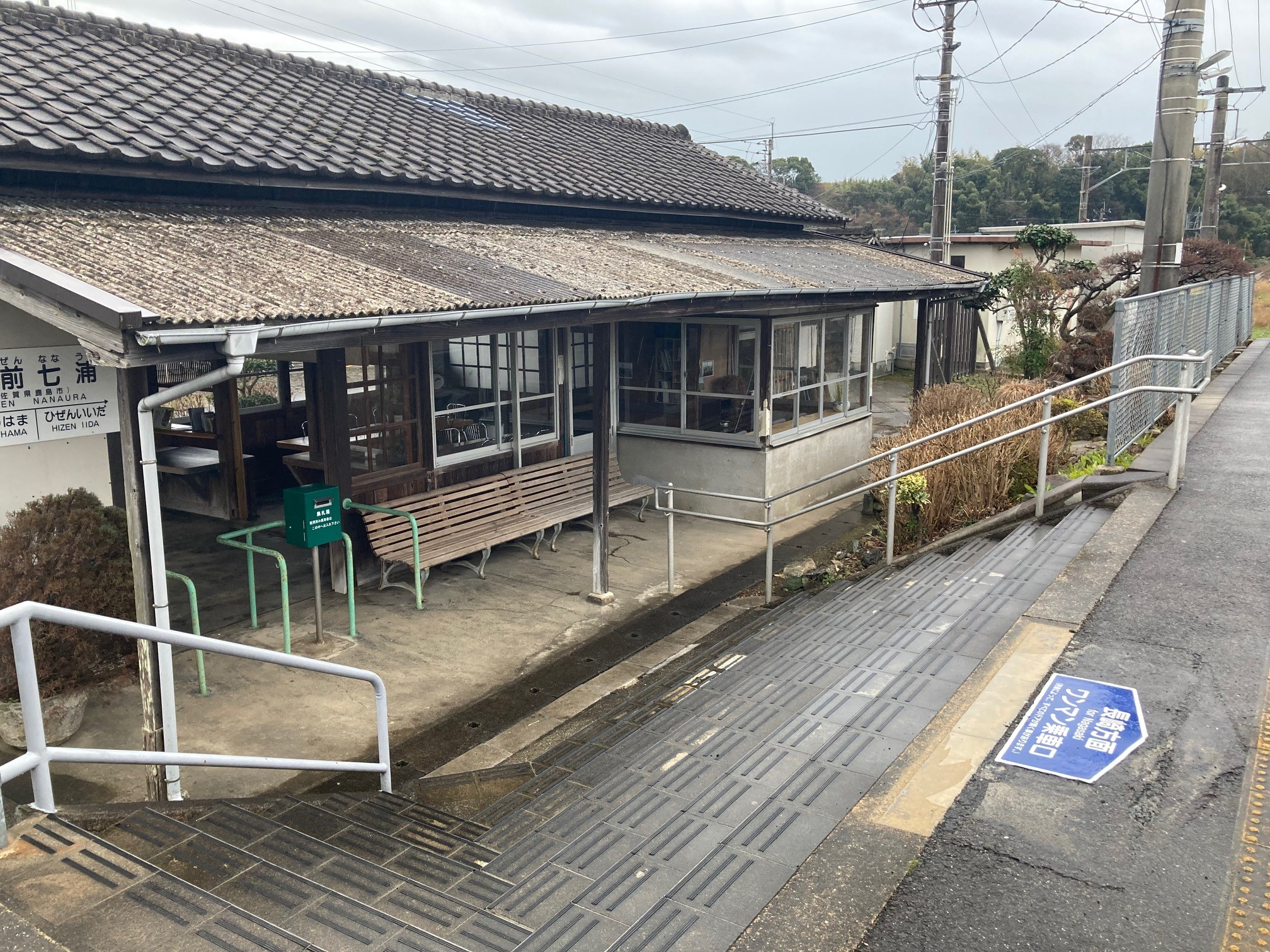
Station building viewed from platform side

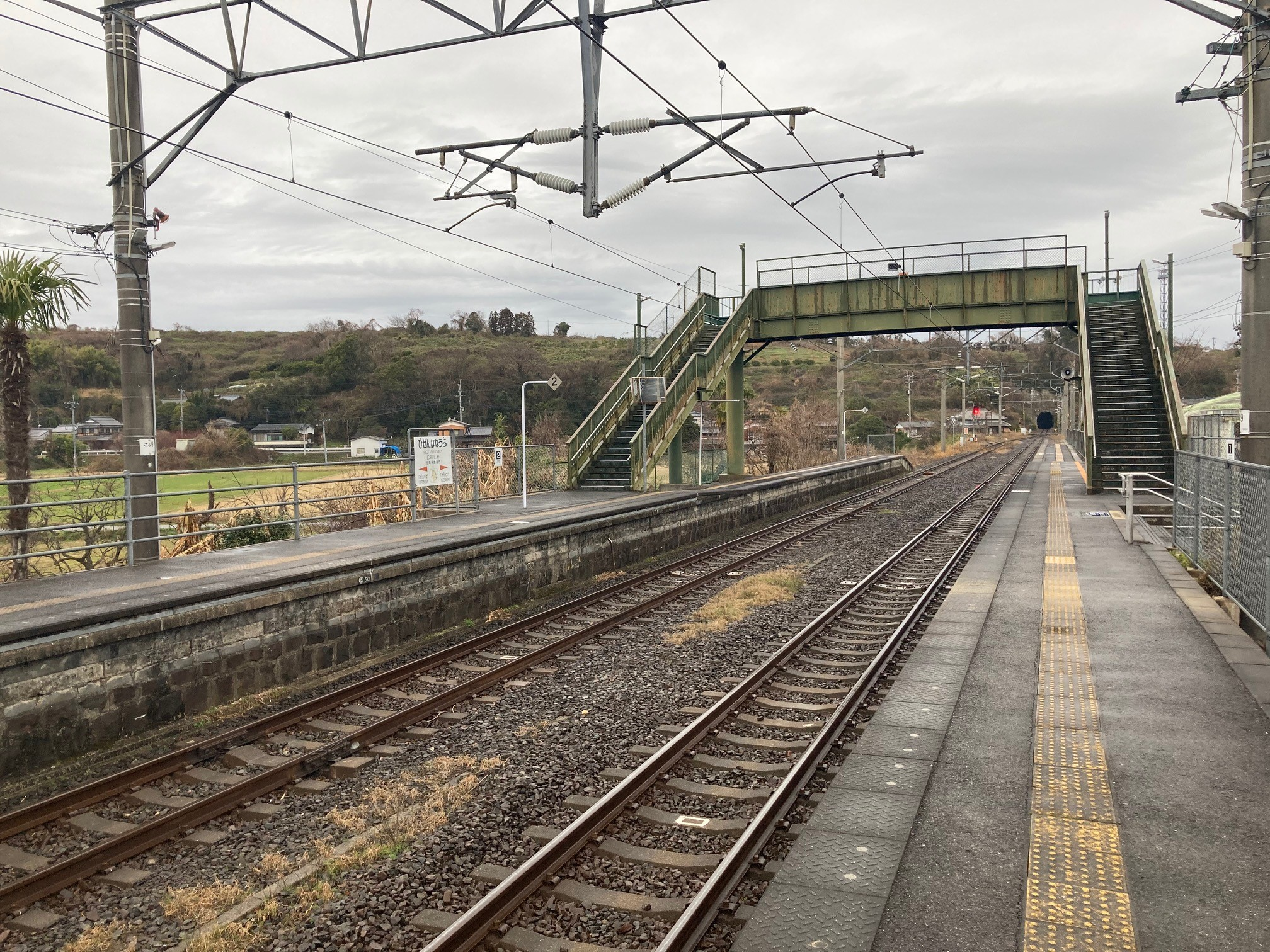
Platform

== History ==
Japanese Government Railways (JGR) built the station in the 1930s during the development of an alternative route for the Nagasaki Main Line along the coast of the Ariake Sea which was at first known as the Ariake Line. The track was built from Hizen-Yamaguchi to Hizen-Ryūō, opening on 9 March 1930, and then to Hizen-Hama, opening on 30 November 1930. In the next phase of expansion, the track was extended to Tara which opened on 16 April 1934 as the new southern terminus. Hizen-Hanaura was opened on the same day as an intermediate station along the new stretch of track. On 1 December 1934, the entire route was completed and through-traffic achieved from Hizen-Yamaguchi through the station to Nagasaki. The track was then redesignated as part of the Nagasaki Main Line. With the privatization of Japanese National Railways (JNR), the successor of JGR, on 1 April 1987, control of the station passed to JR Kyushu.

== Surrounding area ==
- Kashima Roadside Station
- Kashima Gatalympics (during this time some limited express Kamome trains stop here)

== See also ==
- List of railway stations in Japan
