= Akatsuki (train) =

Japanese overnight sleeper train service

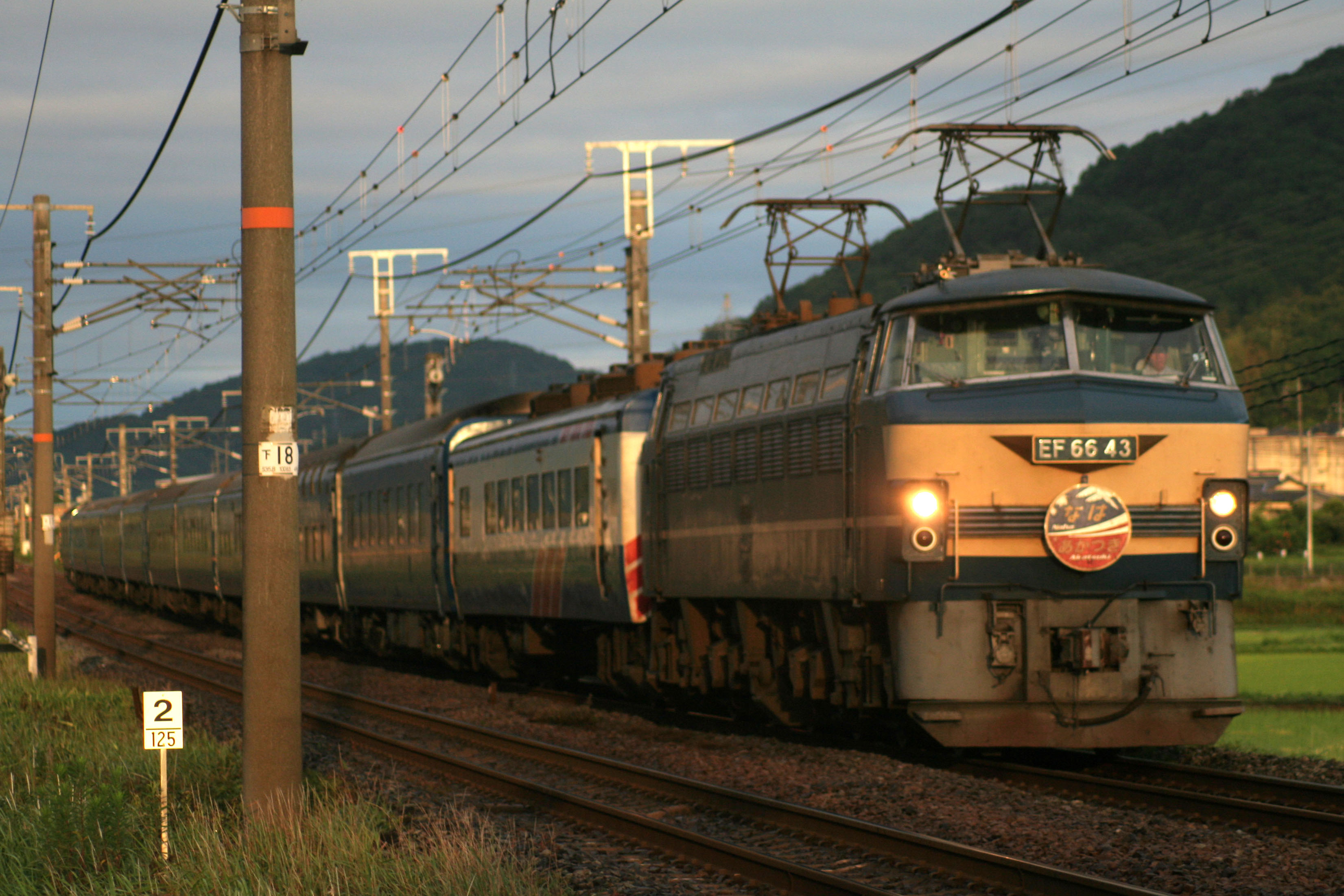
- Naha/Akatsuki headed by EF66 electric locomotive (2007)

Overview
- Service type: Limited express
- First service: 1965
- Last service: 2008
- Current operator(s): JR West

Route
- Line(s) used: Tōkaidō Main Line, Sanyō Main Line, Kagoshima Main Line, Nagasaki Main Line

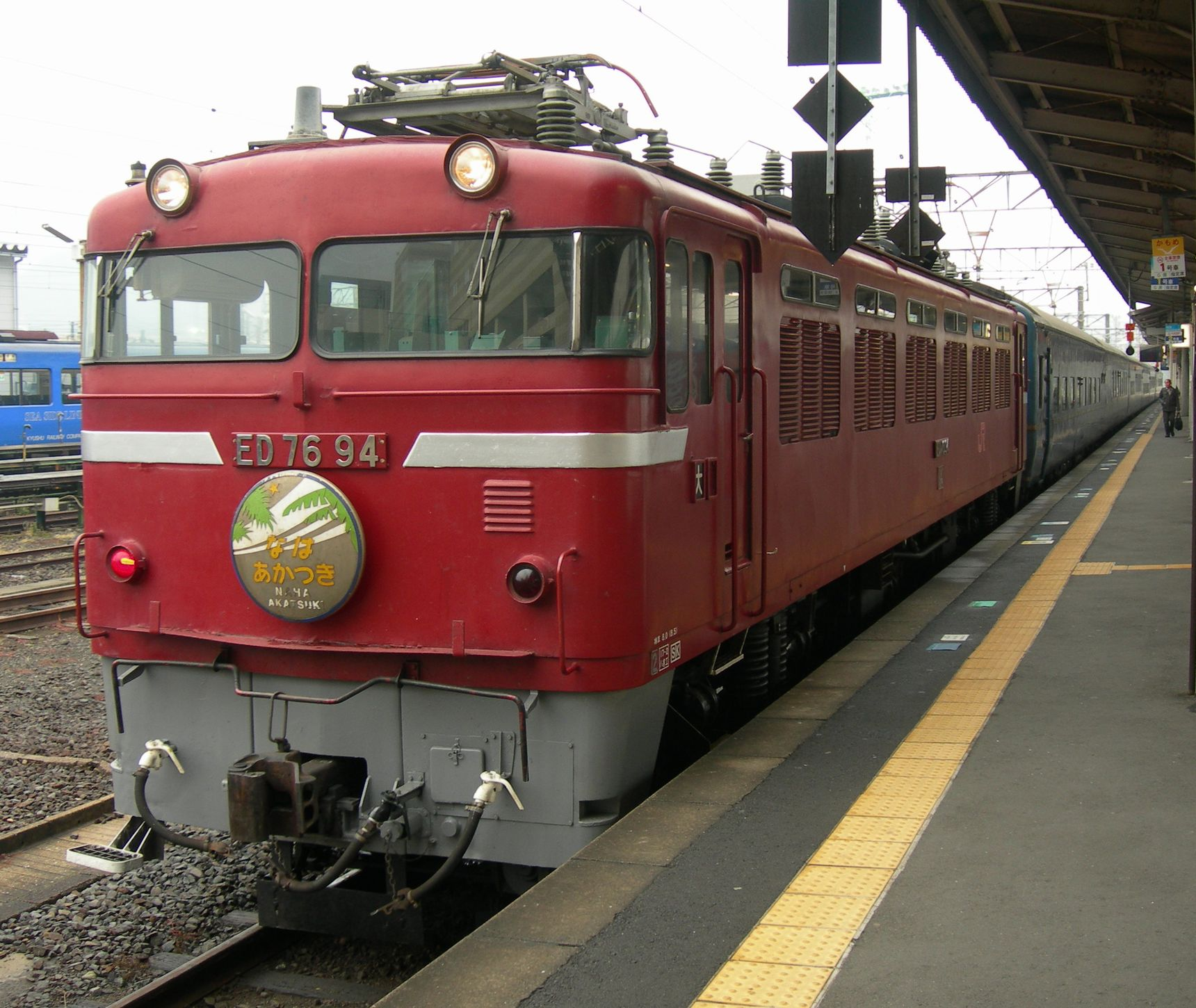
Akatsuki at Nagasaki Station headed by ED76 electric locomotive (2008)

The Akatsuki (あかつき; Dawn) was an overnight sleeper train service in Japan operated by JR West from Kyoto Station to Nagasaki Station and return. It ran on the Tōkaido, Sanyō, Kagoshima, and Nagasaki main lines.

From October 2005, the train ran coupled with the Naha sleeper between Kyoto Station and Tosu Station.

Due to falling passenger numbers, both the Naha and Akatsuki services ceased following the March 15, 2008 timetable revision.

== Schedule ==
Timetable of Akatsuki, as of March 2008 before its discontinuation

km	Station	Train #31 for Nagasaki		Train #32 for Kyoto	
0.0	Kyoto	20:02	Dp	7:53	Ar
39.0	Shin-Osaka	20:28	Ar	7:24	Dp
39.0	Shin-Osaka	20:35	Dp	7:24	Ar
42.8	Osaka	20:41	Ar	7:19	Dp
42.8	Osaka	20:47	Dp	7:17	Ar
73.4	Sannomiya	21:10	Ar	6:53	Dp
73.4	Sannomiya	21:11	Dp	6:52	Ar
130.7	Himeji	21:53	Ar	6:08	Dp
130.7	Himeji	21:55	Dp	6:06	Ar
219.3	Okayama	23:00	Ar	5:03	Dp
219.3	Okayama	23:02	Dp	5:01	Ar
235.2	Kurashiki	23:16	Ar	4:48	Dp
235.2	Kurashiki	23:16	Dp	4:47	Ar
277.6	Fukuyama	23:49	Ar	4:16	Dp
277.6	Fukuyama	23:50	Dp	4:16	Ar
297.7	Onomichi	0:07	Ar	↑	
297.7	Onomichi	0:07	Dp	↑	
309.2	Mihara	0:20	Ar	↑	
309.2	Mihara	0:21	Dp	↑	
535.1	Shin-Yamaguchi	↓		0:49	Dp
535.1	Shin-Yamaguchi	↓		0:48	Ar
560.4	Ube	↓		0:27	Dp
560.4	Ube	↓		0:27	Ar
570.2	Asa	↓		0:18	Dp
570.2	Asa	↓		0:17	Ar
604.0	Shimonoseki	4:22	Ar	23:49	Dp
604.0	Shimonoseki	4:29	Dp	23:44	Ar
610.3	Moji	4:36	Ar	23:37	Dp
610.3	Moji	4:42	Dp	23:31	Ar
615.8	Kokura	4:49	Ar	23:24	Dp
615.8	Kokura	4:50	Dp	23:24	Ar
629.7	Kurosaki	5:04	Ar	23:12	Dp
629.7	Kurosaki	5:04	Dp	23:12	Ar
683.0	Hakata	5:52	Ar	22:31	Dp
683.0	Hakata	5:53	Dp	22:30	Ar
711.6	Tosu	6:17	Ar	22:07	Dp
711.6	Tosu	Train #33		Train #34	
711.6	Tosu	6:34	Dp	21:48	Ar
736.6	Saga	6:52	Ar	21:29	Dp
736.6	Saga	6:53	Dp	21:29	Ar
751.2	Hizen-Yamaguchi	7:05	Ar	21:17	Dp
751.2	Hizen-Yamaguchi	7:05	Dp	21:17	Ar
766.2	Hizen-Kashima	7:17	Ar	20:05	Dp
766.2	Hizen-Kashima	7:18	Dp	20:04	Ar
812.0	Isahaya	8:12	Ar	20:11	Dp
812.0	Isahaya	8:13	Dp	20:11	Ar
836.9	Nagasaki	8:55	Ar	19:47	Dp

== History ==
Akatsuki, as an overnight limited express service, was introduced on October 1, 1965, by Japanese National Railways. It was operated between Shin-Ōsaka and two destinations in Kyūshū, namely Nishi-Kagoshima (present-day Kagoshima-Chūō) and Nagasaki. It was connected at Shin-Ōsaka with the Tōkaidō Shinkansen.

In the 1960s, the operation of Akatsuki was increased. Its maximum operation was 14 services (7 round-trips) a day in the mid-1970s, and all of them were connected with the Tōkaidō Shinkansen.

At the end of the 1970s, the number of Akatsuki services was reduced due to decreasing ridership.

From November 1986, Akatsuki remains as only two services (one round-trips) a day.

Due to falling passenger numbers, the service was discontinued in March 2008.

== Rolling stock ==
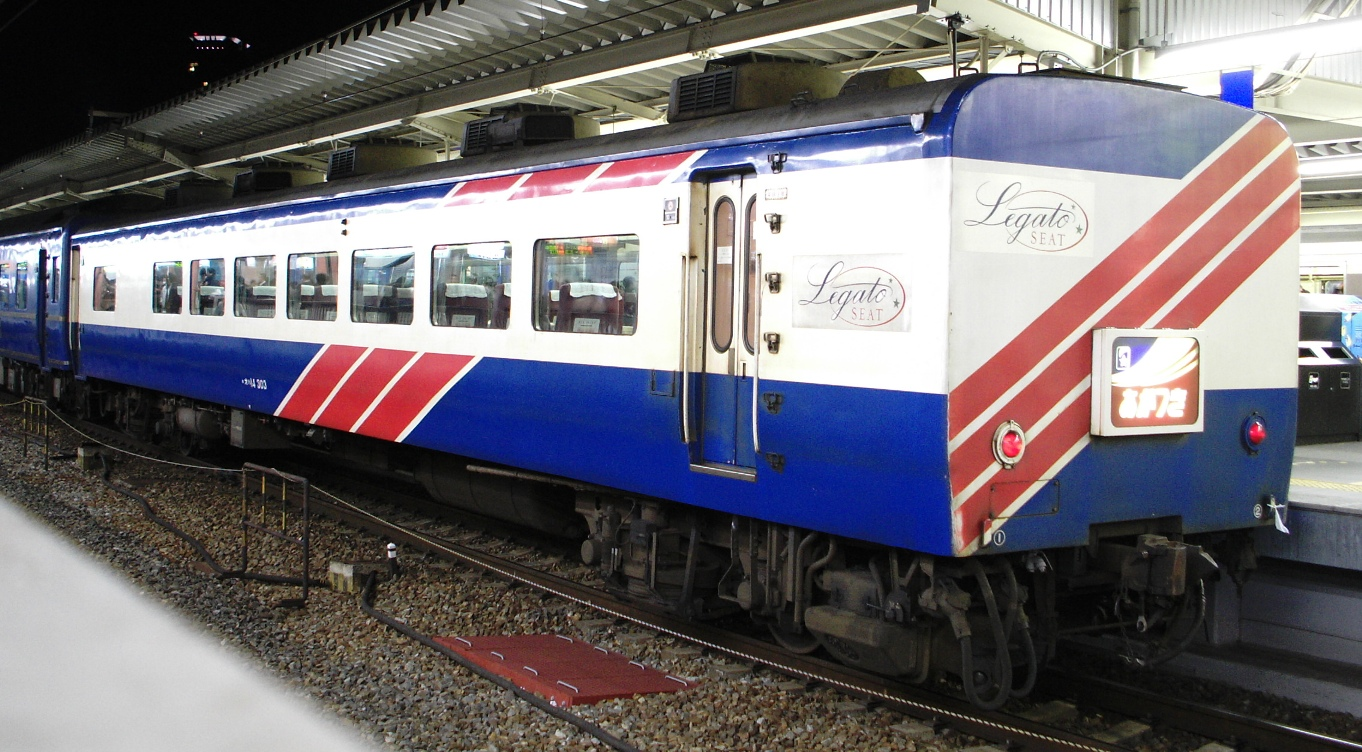
Special "Legato Seat" coach exclusive for Akatsuki

Historically, Akatsuki used the following types of coaches:

- 20 series passenger cars
- 14/15 series passenger cars
- 24/25 series passenger cars

When the train was discontinued, the train consisted of 14/15 series cars.

== See also ==
- List of named passenger trains of Japan
