= Nabeshima Station =

Railway station in Saga, Saga Prefecture, Japan

Nabeshima Station 鍋島駅
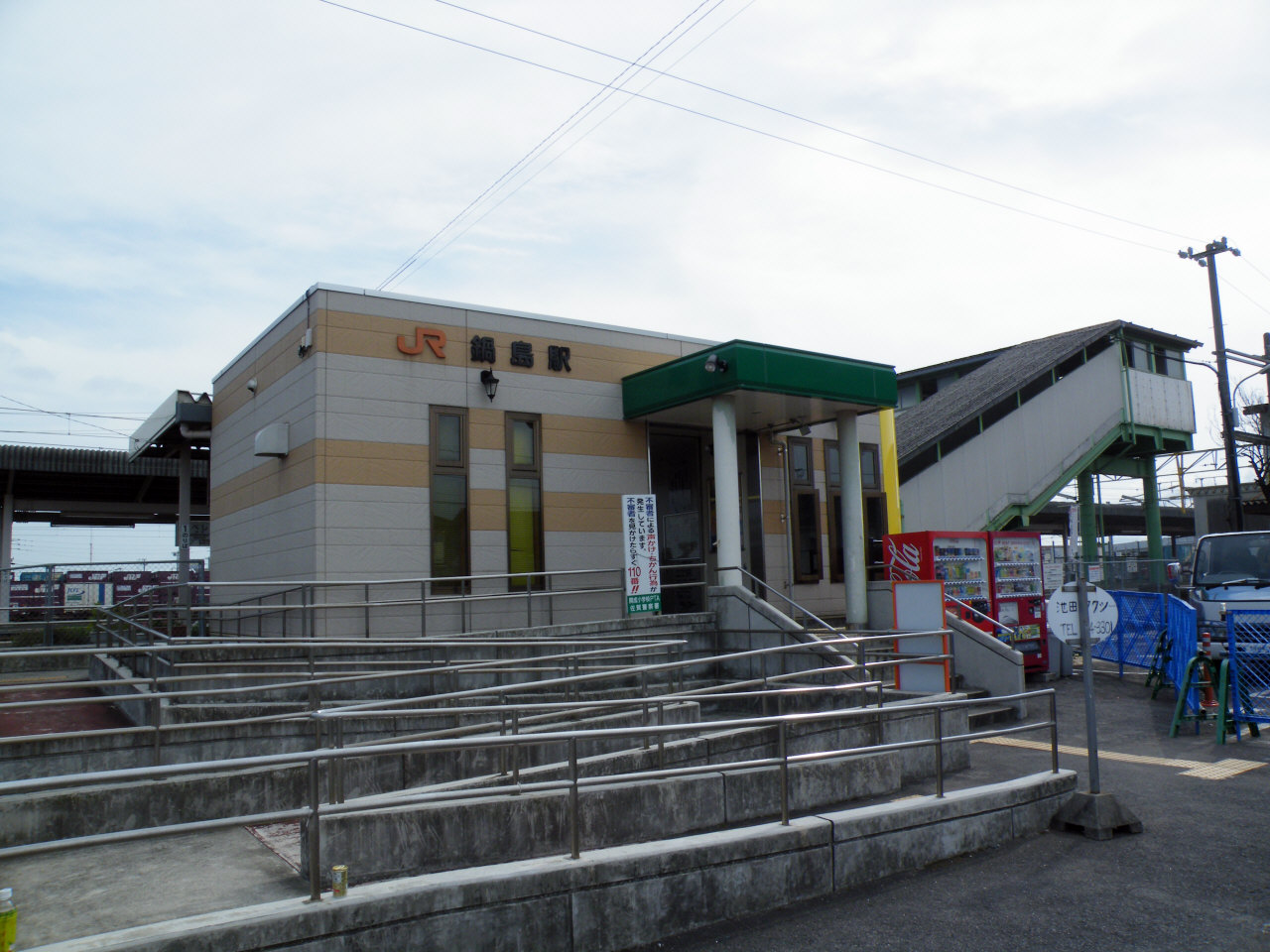
- Nabeshima Station

General information
- Location: Yaemizo Nabeshima, Saga-shi, Saga-ken, 849-0932; Japan
- Coordinates: 33°15′33″N 130°15′57″E
- Operator: JR Kyushu; JR Freight
- Line: JH Nagasaki Main Line
- Distance: 28.0 km (17.4 mi) from Tosu
- Platforms: 1 side + 1 island platform

Other information
- Status: Unstaffed
- Website: Official website

History
- Opened: 7 July 1930

Passengers
- FY2022: 446 daily
- Rank: 229th (among JR Kyushu stations)

Services
Preceding station	JR Kyushu	Following station
Kubota towards Nagasaki	Nagasaki Line	Saga towards Tosu
Balloon Saga towards Nagasaki	Nagasaki Line Seasonal	Saga towards Tosu
Location
- Location within Saga Prefecture Location within Japan

Nabeshima Station (鍋島駅, Nabeshima-eki) is a passenger railway station located in the Nabeshima neighborhood of the city of Saga, Saga Prefecture, Japan. It is operated by JR Kyushu and is on the Nagasaki Main Line. It is also a freight terminal operated by the Japan Freight Railway Company (JR Freight).

== Lines ==
The station is served by the Nagasaki Main Line, located 28.0 km (17.4 mi) from the starting point of the line at Tosu.

== Layout ==
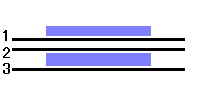
→:for Kubota ←:for Saga

The station consists of one island platform and one side platform connected by a footbridge. Platform 3 on the island platform, where outbound trains arrive and depart, is used by some direct trains to the Karatsu Line and freight trains during peak loading seasons, as well as for the return trip of the special express "Kamome" trains that depart and arrive at Saga Station during peak passenger seasons. The station is unattended.

=== Platforms ===
1	■ JH Nagasaki Main Line	for Saga and Tosu
2	■ JH Nagasaki Main Line	for Isahaya and Nagasaki
2, 3	■ JK Karatsu Line	for Karatsu and Nishi-Karatsu

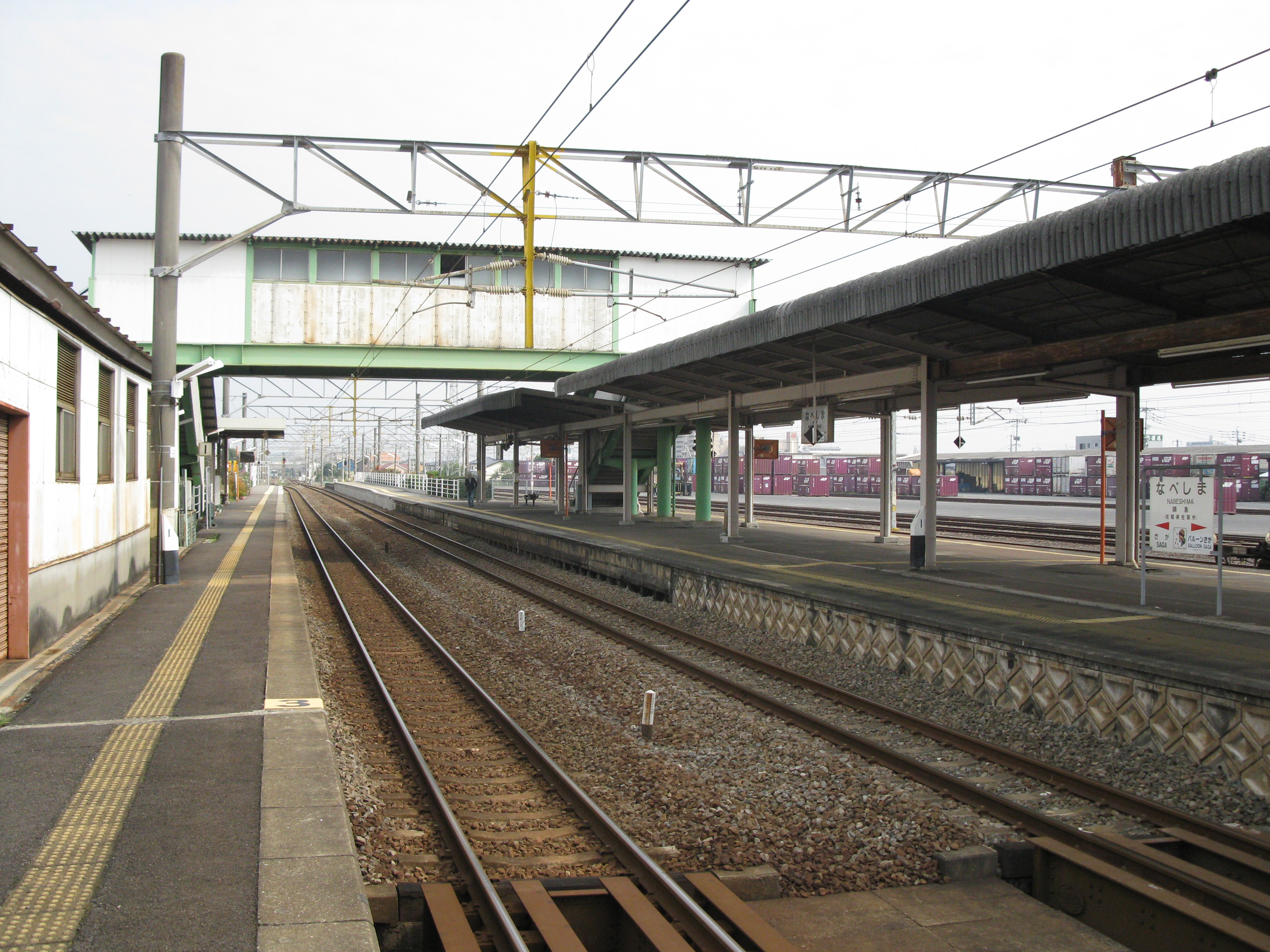
Platforms

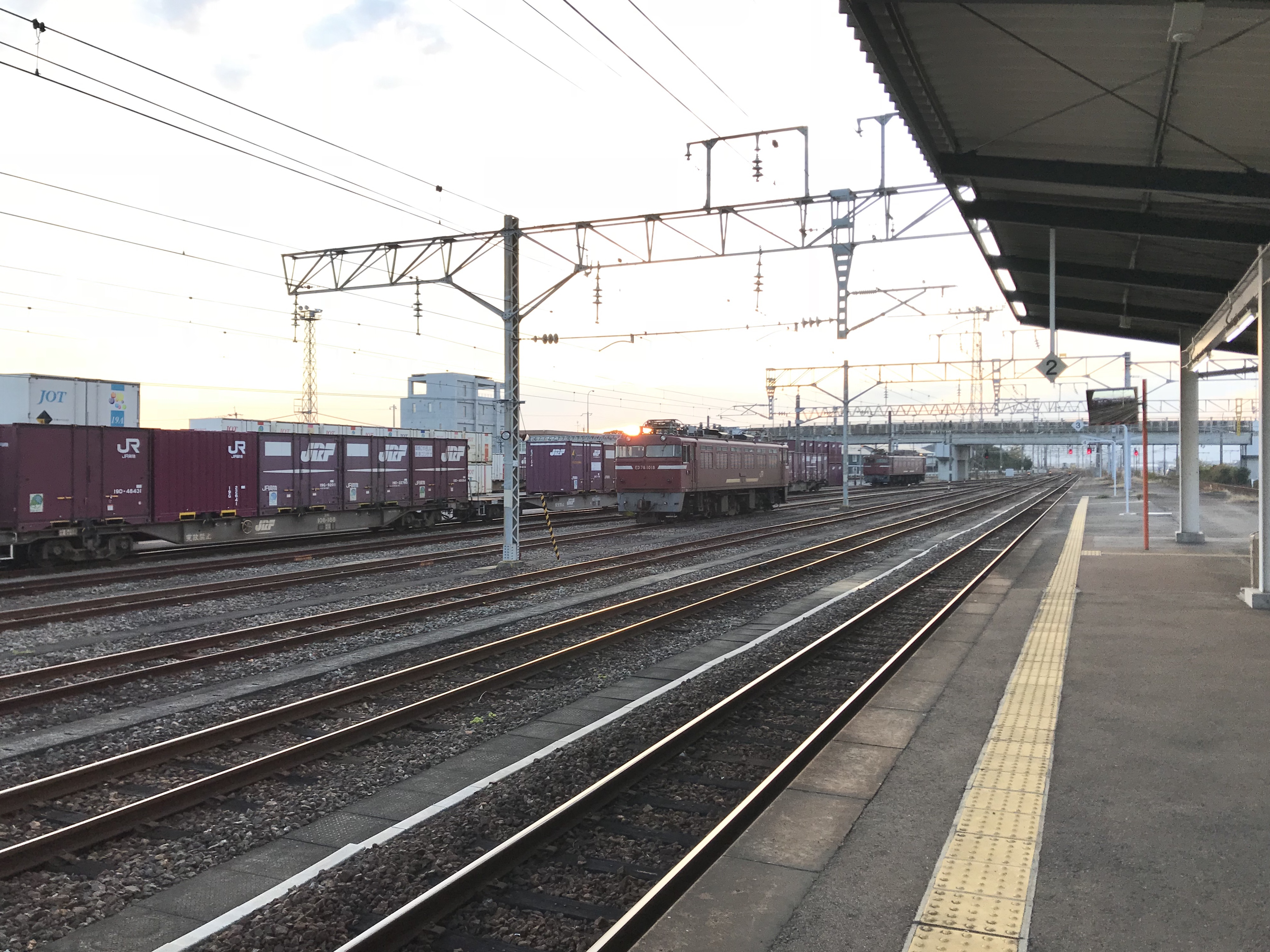
Freight lines

== History ==
Japanese Government Railways (JGR) opened the station as Nabeshima signal box (鍋島信号場, Nabeshima-shingōba) on 1 October 1926 on the existing track of the Nagasaki Main Line. On 7 July 1930, the facility was upgraded to a full station and passenger traffic commenced. With the privatization of Japanese National Railways (JNR), the successor of JGR, on 1 April 1987, control of the station passed to JR Kyushu.

== Passenger statistics ==
In fiscal 2020, the station was used by an average of 446 passengers daily (boarding passengers only), and it ranked 229th among the busiest stations of JR Kyushu.

== Surrounding area ==
- Saga Prefectural School for the Deaf
- Saga Prefectural Saga Kita High School
- Saga Prefectural Equestrian Training Center

== See also ==
- List of railway stations in Japan
