= Ushizu Station =

Railway station in Ogi, Saga Prefecture, Japan

Ushizu Station 牛津駅
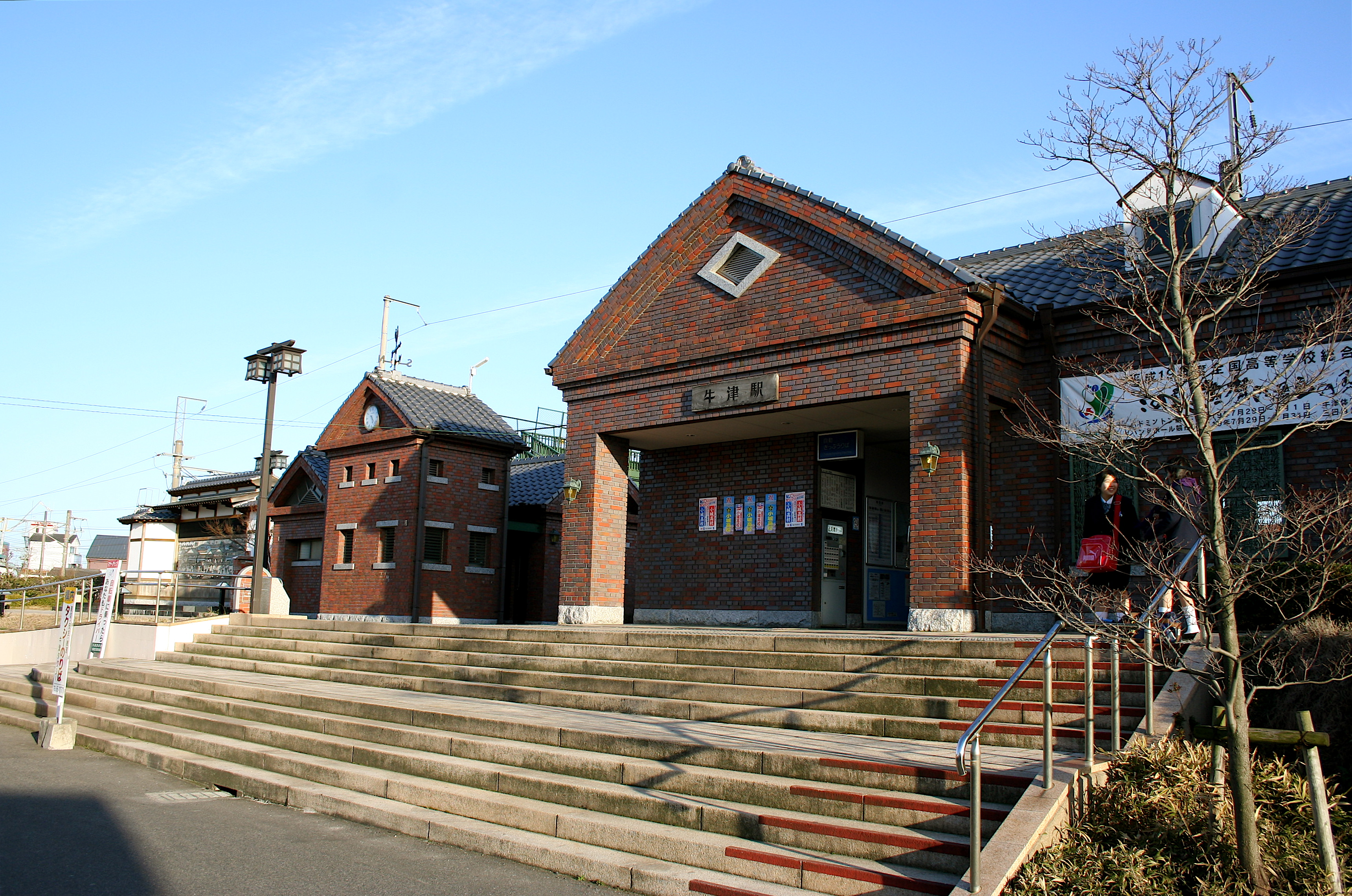
- Ushizu Station in 2008

General information
- Location: Ushizucho Ushizu, Ogi-shi, Saga-ken 849-0303; Japan
- Coordinates: 33°14′53″N 130°12′05″E
- Operator: JR Kyushu
- Line: JH Nagasaki Main Line
- Distance: 34.2 km from Tosu
- Platforms: 2 side platforms
- Tracks: 2

Construction
- Structure type: At grade
- Accessible: No; platforms linked by footbridge

Other information
- Status: Staff ticket window (outsourced)
- Website: Official website

History
- Opened: 5 May 1895

Passengers
- FY2022: 648 daily
- Rank: 190th (among JR Kyushu stations)

Services
Preceding station	JR Kyushu	Following station
Kōhoku towards Nagasaki	Nagasaki Line	Kubota towards Tosu
Location
- Location within Saga Prefecture Location within Japan

Ushizu Station (牛津駅, Ushizu-eki) is a passenger railway station located in the city of Ogi, Saga Prefecture. It is operated by JR Kyushu on the Nagasaki Main Line.

== Lines ==
The station is served by the Nagasaki Main Line and is located 34.2 km from the starting point of the line at Tosu.

=== Platforms ===
1	■ JH Nagasaki Main Line	for Saga and Tosu
2	■ JH Nagasaki Main Line	for Nagasaki

== Station layout ==
The station consists of two side platforms serving two tracks. The station building is a brick structure resembling a traditional warehouse. Besides a staffed ticket windown, the waiting room doubles as an exhibition area featuring local products. Access to the opposite side platform is by means of a footbridge.

Management of the station has been outsourced to the JR Kyushu Tetsudou Eigyou Co., a wholly owned subsidiary of JR Kyushu specialising in station services. It staffs the ticket window which is equipped with a POS machine but does not have a Midori no Madoguchi facility.

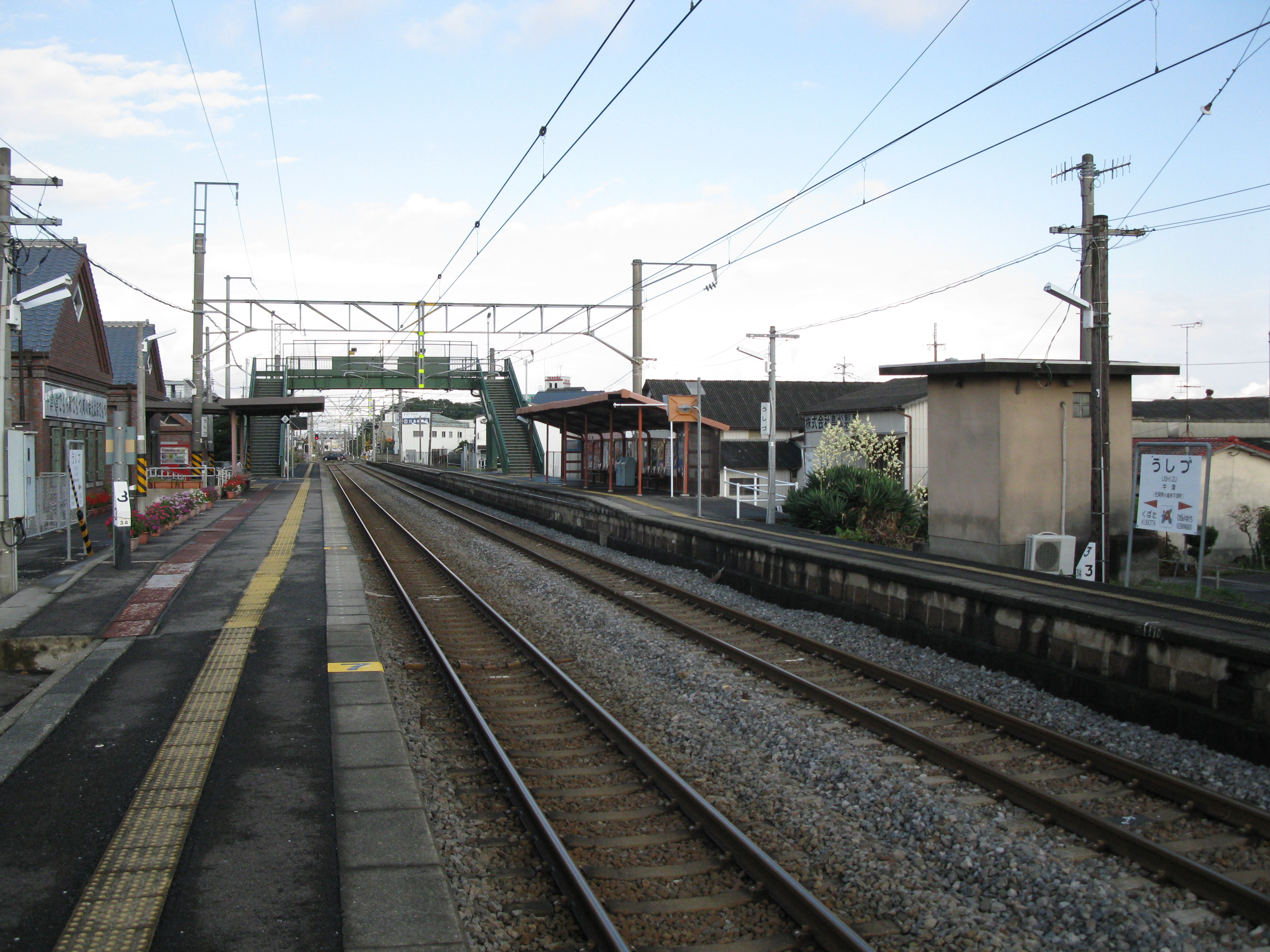
A view of the platform and tracks.

== History ==
The private Kyushu Railway had opened a track from Tosu to Saga on 20 August 1891. In the next phase of expansion, the track was extended westwards with Takeo (today Takeo-Onsen) opening as the new western terminus on 5 May 1895. Ushizu was opened on the same day as an intermediate station along the new stretch of track. When the Kyushu Railway was nationalized on 1 July 1907, Japanese Government Railways (JGR) took over control of the station. On 12 October 1909, the station became part of the Nagasaki Main Line. With the privatization of Japanese National Railways (JNR), the successor of JGR, on 1 April 1987, control of the station passed to JR Kyushu.

== Surrounding area ==
- Ogi City Hall
- Saga Prefectural Ushizu High School
- Ushizu Junior High School
- Ushizu Post Office
- Japan National Route 34
- Japan National Route 207

== Passenger statistics ==
In fiscal 2020, the station was used by an average of 648 passengers daily (boarding passengers only), and it ranked 129nd among the busiest stations of JR Kyushu.

== See also ==
- List of railway stations in Japan
