= Nagasaki Main Line =

Railway line in Saga and Nagasaki prefectures, Japan

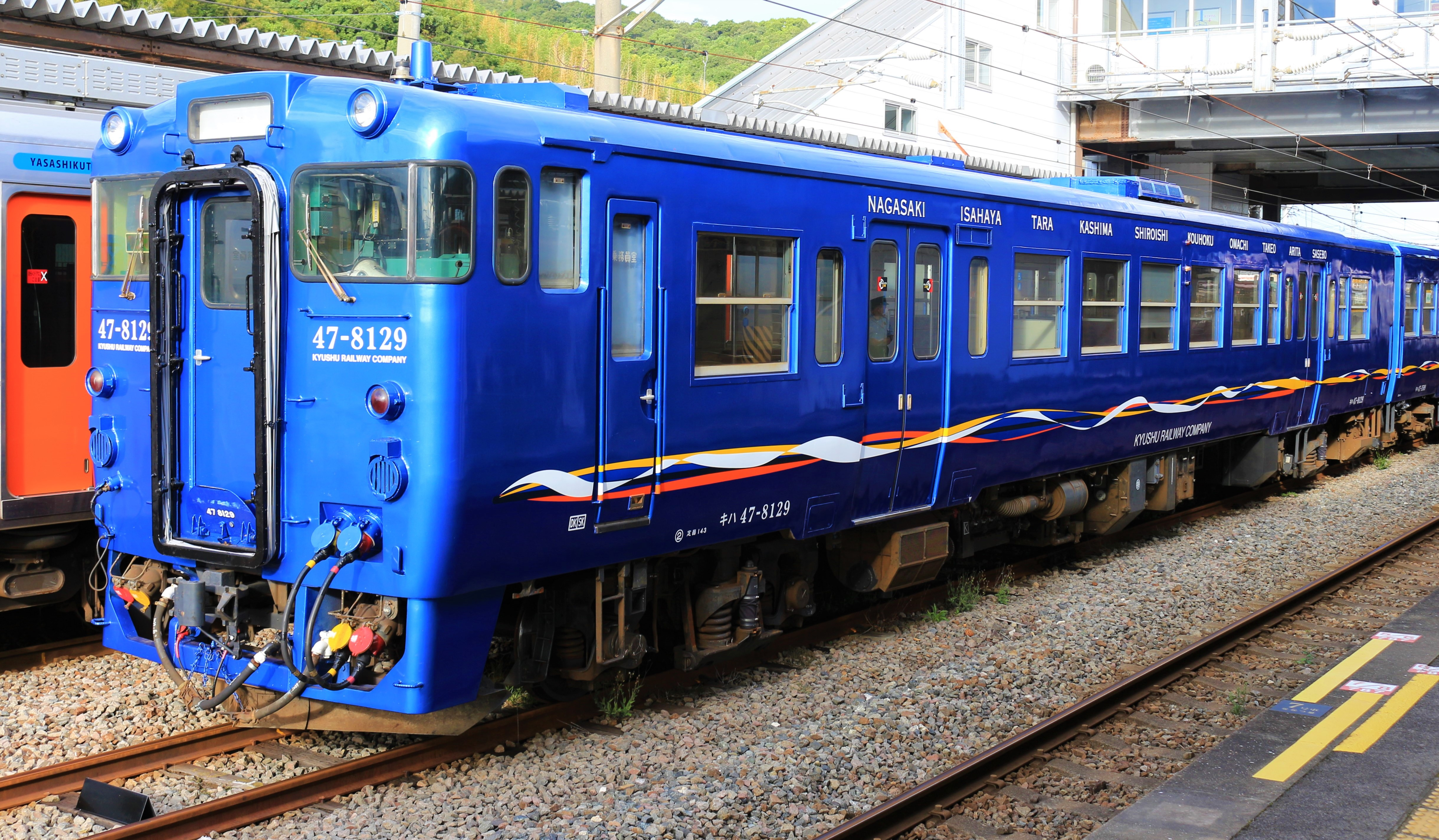
- Kiha 47, which became the mainstay of the non-electrified section of the Nagasaki Main Line (Kōhoku Station on September 24, 2022)

Overview
- Owner: JR Kyushu
- Locale: Saga, Nagasaki prefectures
- Termini: Tosu; Nagasaki
- Stations: 41

Service
- Type: Heavy rail
- Operator(s): JR Kyushu, JR Freight

History
- Opened: 1891

Technical
- Line length: 148.8 km (92.5 mi)
- Track gauge: 1,067 mm (3 ft 6 in)
- Electrification: 20 kV AC, 60 Hz Overhead catenary (Tosu-Hizen-Hama)
Route map
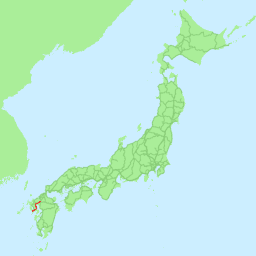

The Nagasaki Main Line (長崎本線, Nagasaki-honsen), or simply known as the Nagasaki Line, is a railway line owned by the Kyushu Railway Company (JR Kyushu) connecting Tosu Station in Saga Prefecture to Nagasaki Station in Nagasaki Prefecture, Japan. There is a separate branch of this line from Kikitsu Station to Urakami Station by way of the Nagasaki Tunnel, rather than via Nagayo Station, avoiding a long detour.

== Route data ==
- Operators and route length:
  - JR Kyushu (services and tracks)
    - Tosu - Nagasaki: 125.3 km (77.9 mi)
    - Kikitsu - Nagayo - Urakami: 23.5 km (14.6 mi)
  - JR Freight (services)
    - Tosu - Nagasaki: 125.3 km (77.9 mi)
- Stations: 41 (including seasonal stations)
- Double-tracking:
  - Tosu - Kōhoku
  - Isahaya - Kikitsu
  - Urakami - Nagasaki
- Electrification: Tosu - Hizen-Hama (20kV AC 60 Hz)
- Railway signalling: Automatic
- CTC center: Hakata Integrated Operations Center

== Route description ==
The line is single-tracked between the Kōhoku and Isahaya stations due to the coastal geography of the area making double-tracking prohibitively expensive. The "old route" (旧線) is the branch of the Nagasaki Main Line between Kikitsu and Urakami (via Nagayo) that existed before the opening of the new route. Prior to the new route's opening, express and limited express trains ran on this section. Vestiges of this can be seen at Michinoo and other stations along the route. The "new line" (新線) is the branch of the Nagasaki Main Line between Isahaya and Urakami via Ichinuno through the Nagasaki Tunnel. The line was electrified in 1976, however, due to the lack of freight trains running beyond Nabeshima and a low population along the line, the section between Hizen-Hama and Nagasaki was de-electrified after the opening of the Nishi Kyushu Shinkansen.

== Services ==
=== Limited express ===
As of 23 September 2022, the Relay Kamome limited express operates on the Nagasaki Main Line until Kōhoku before splitting off to Takeo-Onsen where passengers can board the Nishi Kyushu Shinkansen to Nagasaki. The merged Midori/Huis Ten Bosch limited express operates east of Kōhoku Station, with some services operating additionally as a Relay Kamome until Takeo-Onsen. Prior to the opening of the new Shinkansen line, limited express trains travelled over the new route between the Isahaya and Urakami stations. Limited Express Relay Kamome trains are operated by JR Kyushu using the 6-car 885 series and the 8-car 787 series. A new limited express service, Kasasagi, was introduced between Hizen-Kashima and Hakata, with through services to Mojiko. This was done to make up for the loss of the Express Relay Kamome along the line. Kasasagi uses the 6-car 885 series, the 8-car 787 series, and the 8-car 783 series EMUs.

Overnight sleeper trains, such as the Sakura (between Tokyo and Nagasaki) and Akatsuki (between Kyoto and Nagasaki), were discontinued in 2008.

=== Regional trains ===
Other than the trains that are operated on the entire Nagasaki Line, there are trains which operate in specific sections, such as from Tosu to Hizen-Kashima, and trains which continue onto other lines. From 23 September, all electric trains are slated to be replaced by DMUs and hybrid diesel-electric trains between Hizen-Hama and Nagasaki.

- In the morning, from Hizen-Nanaura Station, there is a direct train to Mojikō Station (on the Kagoshima Main Line).
- The new line from Isahaya to Nagasaki uses EMUs, but the old line, including direct trains to the Omura Line, uses DMUs. However, the rapid service train Seaside Liner, despite being a DMU, uses the new line.
- Between Hizen-Nanaura Station and Yue Station, because it is a relatively inactive part of the line, local trains only run for about five hours into the daytime after the morning rush.
- Wanman Driver-only operation trains are operated on the entire Nagasaki Line. On the new line, the 817 series EMU is used, and on the old line, the KiHa 66, 67, and 200 DMUs are used.

=== Freight ===
Freight trains are operated between Tosu and Nabeshima. High-speed freight trains make three round trips a day from Tosu Freight Terminal to Nabeshima. The electric locomotive used is the Class ED76. Freight trains only arrive and depart from Nabeshima station.

== Stations ==
Legend

- All trains stop at stations marked "●", some stop at stations marked "▲". All trains pass stations marked "｜".
- Double-tracked sections are marked "∥", single-tracked sections where trains may pass are marked "◇", and single-tracked sections where trains cannot pass are marked "｜".
  "^" and "∨" indicate a boundary between single- and double-track sections.

=== New route (via Ichinuno) ===
- "Rapid" refers to the Seaside Liner rapid service.
- Local trains make all stops. For information on the Relay Kamome, Midori and Huis Ten Bosch limited express services consult their respective articles.

Numbering	Station	Distance (km)		36 + 3	Futatsuboshi 4047	Seaside Liner (Rapid)	Transfers		Location (Town | Prefecture)	
Numbering	Station	Between Stations	Total	36 + 3	Futatsuboshi 4047	Seaside Liner (Rapid)	Transfers		Location (Town | Prefecture)	
JH 01	Tosu	-	0.0	To/from Hakata	To/from Takeo-Onsen	To/from Ōmura Line	JA Kagoshima Main Line	∥	Tosu	Saga
JH 02	Shin-Tosu	2.0	2.0	To/from Hakata	To/from Takeo-Onsen	To/from Ōmura Line	Kyūshū Shinkansen	∥	Tosu	Saga
JH 03	Hizen-Fumoto	2.2	4.2	To/from Hakata	To/from Takeo-Onsen	To/from Ōmura Line		∥	Tosu	Saga
JH 04	Nakabaru	4.3	8.5	To/from Hakata	To/from Takeo-Onsen	To/from Ōmura Line		∥	Miyaki, Miyaki District	Saga
JH 05	Yoshinogari-Kōen	4.6	13.1	To/from Hakata	To/from Takeo-Onsen	To/from Ōmura Line		∥	Yoshinogari, Kanzaki District	Saga
JH 06	Kanzaki	2.6	15.7	To/from Hakata	To/from Takeo-Onsen	To/from Ōmura Line		∥	Kanzaki	Saga
JH 07	Igaya	4.5	20.2	To/from Hakata	To/from Takeo-Onsen	To/from Ōmura Line		∥	Saga	Saga
JH 08	Saga	4.8	25.0	●	To/from Takeo-Onsen	To/from Ōmura Line		∥	Saga	Saga
	Nabeshima	3.0	28.0	|	To/from Takeo-Onsen	To/from Ōmura Line		∥	Saga	Saga
	Balloon Saga (seasonal)	1.8	29.8	|	To/from Takeo-Onsen	To/from Ōmura Line		∥	Saga	Saga
	Kubota	1.6	31.4	|	To/from Takeo-Onsen	To/from Ōmura Line	■ Karatsu Line (Note: Karatsu Line trains run through to Saga Station)	∥	Saga	Saga
	Ushizu	2.8	34.2	|	To/from Takeo-Onsen	To/from Ōmura Line		∥	Ogi	Saga
	Kōhoku	5.4	39.6	|	▲	To/from Ōmura Line	Sasebo Line (some trains through to/from Tosu)	∨	Kōhoku, Kishima District	Saga
	Hizen-Shiroishi	5.1	44.7	|	|	To/from Ōmura Line		◇	Shiroishi, Kishima District	Saga
	Hizen-Ryūō	4.7	49.4	|	|	To/from Ōmura Line		◇	Shiroishi, Kishima District	Saga
	Hizen-Kashima	5.2	54.6	|	|	To/from Ōmura Line		◇	Kashima	Saga
	Hizen-Hama	3.0	57.6	●	▲	To/from Ōmura Line		◇	Kashima	Saga
	Hizen-Nanaura	3.9	61.5		|	To/from Ōmura Line		◇	Kashima	Saga
	Hizen-Iida	2.1	63.6		|	To/from Ōmura Line		◇	Kashima	Saga
	Tara	4.1	67.7		▲	To/from Ōmura Line		◇	Tara, Fujitsu District	Saga
	Hizen-Ōura	7.9	75.6		|	To/from Ōmura Line		◇	Tara, Fujitsu District	Saga
	Konagai	6.7	82.3		▲	To/from Ōmura Line		◇	Isahaya	Nagasaki
	Nagasato	2.4	84.7		|	To/from Ōmura Line		◇	Isahaya	Nagasaki
	Yue	2.9	87.6		|	To/from Ōmura Line		◇	Isahaya	Nagasaki
	Oe	3.3	90.9		|	To/from Ōmura Line		◇	Isahaya	Nagasaki
	Hizen-Nagata	4.7	95.6		|	To/from Ōmura Line		◇	Isahaya	Nagasaki
	Higashi-Isahaya	2.2	97.8		|	To/from Ōmura Line		◇	Isahaya	Nagasaki
	Isahaya	2.6	100.4		●	●	■ Nishi Kyushu Shinkansen ■ Ōmura Line (through to/from Nagasaki) ■ Shimabara Railway Line	^	Isahaya	Nagasaki
	Nishi-Isahaya	2.8	103.2		|	▲		∥	Isahaya	Nagasaki
	Kikitsu	3.7	106.9		|	●	■ Nagasaki Main Line (old route) (through to/from Isahaya)	∨	Isahaya	Nagasaki
	Ichinuno	2.5	109.4		|	▲		◇	Isahaya	Nagasaki
	Hizen-Koga	2.9	112.3		|	▲		｜	Nagasaki	Nagasaki
	Utsutsugawa	2.5	114.8		|	▲		◇	Nagasaki	Nagasaki
	Urakami	8.9	123.7		|	●	■ Nagasaki Main Line (old route) (through to/from Nagasaki); Nagasaki Electric TramwayMain Line (Urakami-Ekimae)	^	Nagasaki	Nagasaki
	Nagasaki	1.6	125.3		●	●	■ Nishi Kyushu Shinkansen; Nagasaki Electric Tramway Main Line; Sakuramachi Branch (Nagasaki-Ekimae)	∥	Nagasaki	Nagasaki

=== Old route (via Nagayo) ===
- All stations located within Nagasaki Prefecture.
- All trains make all stops.

Station	Distance (km)		Transfers		Location	
Station	Between Stations	Total	Transfers		Location	
Kikitsu	-	0.0	JH Nagasaki Main Line (new route) (through to/from Isahaya)	◇	Isahaya	Nagasaki
Higashisono	3.5	3.5		｜	Isahaya	Nagasaki
Ōkusa	3.7	7.2		◇	Isahaya	Nagasaki
Honkawachi	5.1	12.3		｜	Nagayo	Nagasaki
Nagayo	3.1	15.4		◇	Nagayo	Nagasaki
Kōda	1.0	16.4		｜	Nagayo	Nagasaki
Michinoo	2.5	18.9		｜	Nagayo	Nagasaki
Nishi-Urakami	1.7	20.6		｜	Nagasaki	Nagasaki
Urakami	2.9	23.5	JH Nagasaki Main Line (new route) (through to/from Nagasaki); Nagasaki Electric Tramway Main Line (Urakami-Ekimae)	◇	Nagasaki	Nagasaki

== Rolling stock ==
- 885 series (Relay Kamome, Kasasagi,Midori)
- 783 series (Midori, Huis ten Bosch)
- 787 series (Relay Kamome, Midori)
- 811 series (Between Tosu and Hizen-Hama)
- 813 series (Between Tosu and Hizen-Hama)
- 817 series (Between Tosu and Hizen-Hama)
- 415 series (Between Tosu and Hizen-Hama)
- Kiha 47
- KiHa 66/67 DMUs (Seaside Liner)
- KiHa 200 DMUs (Seaside Liner)
- YC1 series

== History ==
The Kyushu Railway Co. opened the Tosu - Saga section in 1891, extending it to Nagasaki via Haiki in 1898.

In 1907, the Railway Nationalization Act was passed in Japan, nationalising all major railways. The Hizen-Yamaguchi - Isahaya direct line was opened in 1934, with the Hizen-Yamaguchi - Haiki section being renamed the Sasebo Line and the Haiki - Isahaya section the Omura Line.

The Saga - Nabeshima section was the first to be duplicated in 1966, and by 1969 the Tosu - Hizen-Yamaguchi and Isahaya - Kikitsu sections were duplicated. The Urakami-Nagasaki section was duplicated in 1990.

The 6173m Shin-Nagasaki tunnel and associated Kititsu - Urakami deviation opened in 1972, and the entire line was electrified in 1976. Freight services beyond Nabeshima ceased in 1999.

=== Former connecting lines ===
Saga station: the 24 km line to Setaka (on the Kagoshima Main Line) opened 1931–35, and closed in 1987. This line crossed three major watercourses by substantial bridges.

=== Future plans ===
As of January 2022, it was announced that the Nagasaki Main Line would be split into two sections, with upper and lower management separation to be introduced. JR Kyushu will continue to operate trains in the two section as a Type 2 Railway Business while the infrastructure of the 60.8 km (37.8 mi) section between Hizen-Yamaguchi Station and Isahaya Station is to be maintained by Saga-Nagasaki Railway Management Centre as a Type 3 Railway Business. JR Kyushu is to maintain train operations in this section for the next 23 years after the opening of the Nishi Kyushu Shinkansen.

On 10 June 2022, JR Kyushu announced further details regarding the section between Hizen-Yamaguchi station and Isahaya Station. The section between Hizen-Hama Station and Nagasaki Station is to be de-electrified with diesel trains replacing all electric trains running in this section. Hizen-Yamaguchi Station is to be renamed to Kohoku Station (江北). To make up for the loss of express trains running in this section, a new express train "Kasasagi" is to operate between Hizen-Kashima Station and Saga Station with services going onwards to Hakata Station. As de-electrification means the joyful train "36 plus 3" will no longer be able to reach Nagasaki Station, a new diesel joyful train "Futatsuboshi 4047" is to operate along the Nagasaki Main Line during the morning run and Omura Line in the afternoon return run.
