= Kashima, Saga =

Kashima 鹿島市
- City
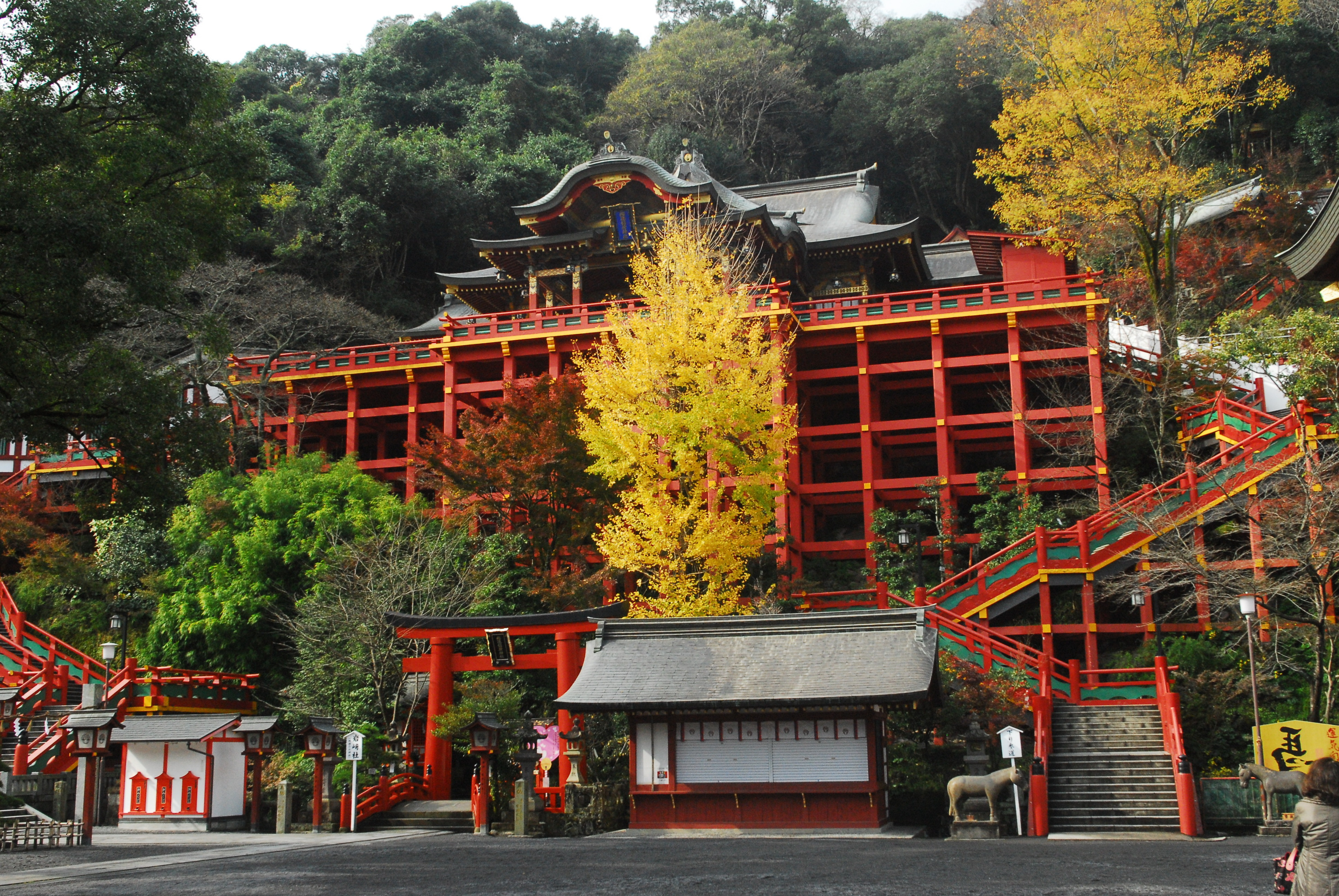
- Yūtoku Inari Shrine

- Flag Emblem
- Interactive map of Kashima
- Location in Japan
- Coordinates: 33°06′14″N 130°05′55″E
- Country: Japan
- Region: Kyushu
- Prefecture: Saga

Government
  - Mayor: Katsutoshi Matsuo

Area
  - Total: 112.12 km^{2} (43.29 sq mi)

Population (May 31, 2024)
  - Total: 27,360
  - Density: 244.0/km^{2} (632.0/sq mi)
- Time zone: UTC+09:00 (JST)
- City hall address: 2643 Ōaza Nōdomibun, Kashima-shi, Saga-ken 849-1391
- Website: Official website
- Symbols
- Flower: Cherry blossom
- Tree: Sweet osmanthus

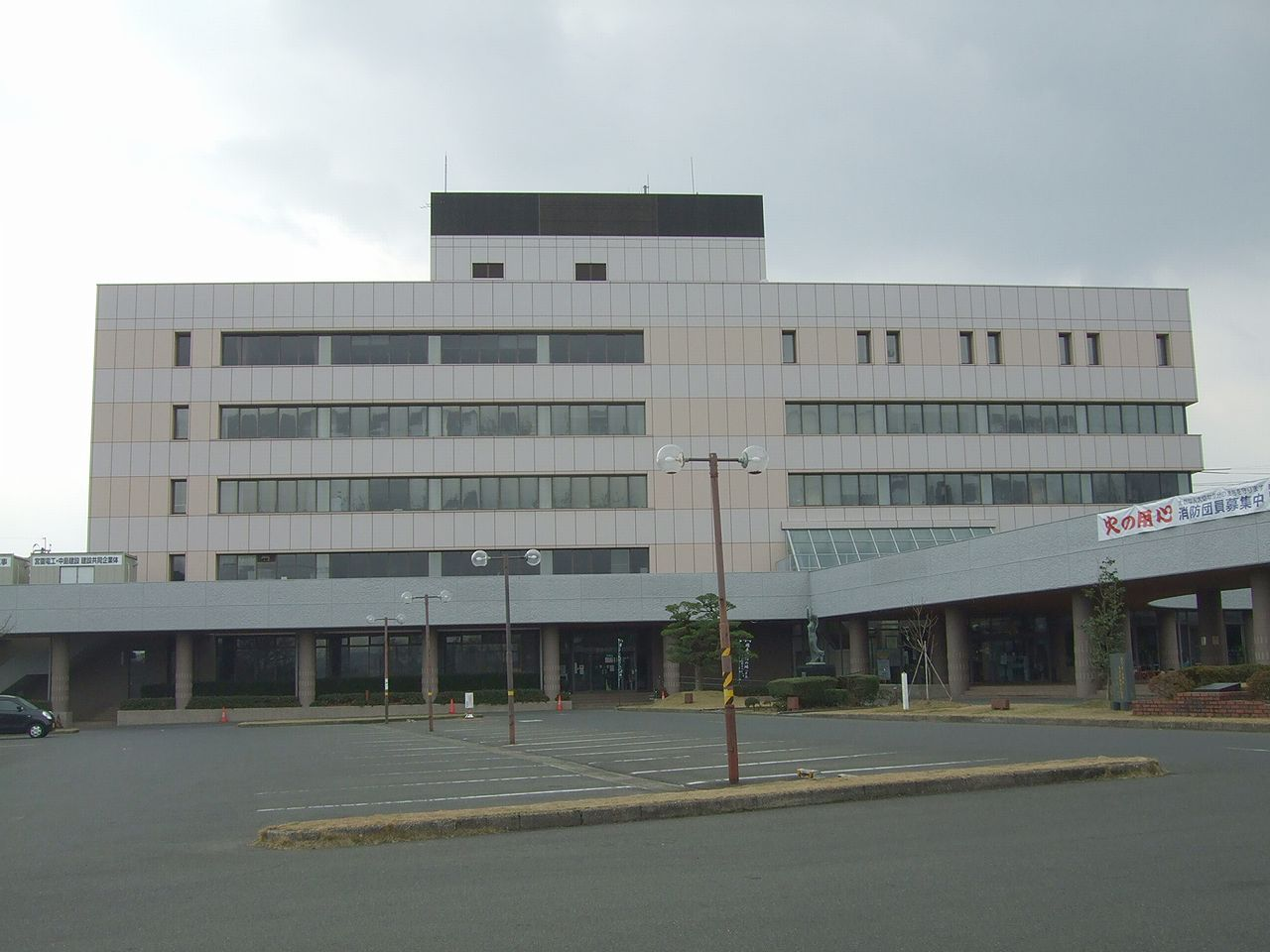
Kashima City Hall

Kashima (鹿島市, Kashima-shi) is a city located in the southern part of Saga Prefecture on the island of Kyushu, Japan. As of 31 May 2024, the city had an estimated population of 27,360 in 10949 households, and a population density of 240 persons per km^{2}. The total area of the city is 112.12 km^{2} (43.29 sq mi).

== Geography ==
Kashima is located in the southern part of Saga Prefecture, about 60 kilometers southwest of Saga City. The eastern part of the city faces the Ariake Sea, and the southwestern part forms the prefectural border with Nagasaki Prefecture. To the south lies the Tara mountain range, and at its foot, several rivers carve valleys. To the north is a coastal plain where the urban center is located.

- Mountains: Mount Kyōga (1076 m), Mount Jōdo (501 m), Mount Kotoji (501 m), Mount Gibi (198 m)
- Rivers: Shiota River, Kashima River, Hama River, Naka River

=== Adjoining municipalities ===
Nagasaki Prefecture

- Ōmura

Saga Prefecture

- Shiroishi
- Tara
- Ureshino

=== Climate ===
Kashima has a humid subtropical climate (Köppen Cfa) characterized by warm summers and cool winters with light to no snowfall. The average annual temperature in Kashima is 15.9 °C. The average annual rainfall is 1970 mm with September as the wettest month. The temperatures are highest on average in August, at around 26.5 °C, and lowest in January, at around 5.9 °C.

=== Demographics ===
Per Japanese census data, the population of Kashima is as shown below.

Historical population
Year	Pop.	±%
1950	39,013	—
1960	38,504	−1.3%
1970	35,475	−7.9%
1980	35,006	−1.3%
1990	34,336	−1.9%
2000	33,215	−3.3%
2010	30,720	−7.5%
2020	27,892	−9.2%

== History ==
The area of Kashima was part of ancient Hizen Province. During the Edo period it was mostly under Kashima Domain, a sub-domain of Saga Domain ruled by a cadet branch of the Nabeshima clan. Following the Meiji restoration, the villages of Minami-Kashima, Kita-Kashima, Hachihongi, Fureda, Nogomi and Nanaura were established with the creation of the modern municipalities system. Minami-Kashima was raised to town status on December 1, 1912 and Kita-Kashima Village was renamed Kashima Village. Hachihongi Village was elevated to town status on August 3, 1918. Kashima Town absorbed Hama Town, Kashima Village, Furueda Village and Nogomi Village to create Kashima City on April 1, 1954.

== Government ==
Kashima has a mayor-council form of government with a directly elected mayor and a unicameral city council of 16 members. Kashima, collectively with the municipalities of Fujitsu District, Saga contributes two members to the Saga Prefectural Assembly. In terms of national politics, the city is part of the Saga 2nd district of the lower house of the Diet of Japan.

== Economy ==
In the Edo Period, Kashima was famous for its production of Saga Nishiki, a type of brocade. Modern Kashima has a mixed economy with light manufacturing (automotive parts, pharmaceutics), agriculture and aquaculture of edible seaweed.

== Education ==
Kashima has seven public elementary schools and two junior high schools operated by the city government and one public high school operated by the Saga Prefectural Board of Education.

=== High schools ===
- Saga Prefectural Kashima High School
- Saga Prefectural Kashima Vocational High School

=== Junior high schools ===
- Seibu Junior High School
- Tōbu Junior High School

=== Elementary schools ===
- Furueda Elementary School
- Hama Elementary School
- Kashima Elementary School
- Kita-Kashima Elementary School
- Meirin Elementary School
- Nanaura Elementary School
- Nogomi Elementary School

== Transport ==
=== Railway ===
JR Kyushu - Nagasaki Main Line

JH Hizen-Kashima - Hizen-Hama - Hizen-Nanaura - Hizen-Iida

=== Highways ===
- National Route 207
- National Route 444
- National Route 498

== Sister cities ==
- Goheung County, Jeollanam-do, South Korea, friendship city since 1997

== Local attractions ==
- Hizen Hamajuku sake brewing street (肥前浜宿酒蔵通り) is 15 minutes on foot from Hizen-Hama Station.
- Yūtoku Inari Shrine (祐徳稲荷神社), one of the three biggest and most famous Inari shrines in Japan. There is a bus from Hizen-Kashima Station to Yūtoku Inari Shrine.

=== Festivals ===
The Kashima Gatalympics is held every May in Hama-chō, a part of Kashima City. This event is a sports competition carried out on the mudflats on the city's Ariake Sea shoreline, and includes cycling, 25 metre running and sumo wrestling events.

== Sport ==
The local football club is Saga LIXIL F.C., and competes in the Kyushu Football League. Formerly known as Kyushu INAX SC, it changed its name when INAX's parent company LIXIL took over. It's also a pun on the team being from Kashima, as LIXIL also sponsors 8-time Japanese champions Kashima Antlers (from the city in Ibaraki).

== Notable people from Kashima ==
- Narimi Arimori, actress
- Yu Hirakawa, football player
- YUKI, one half of the duo BENNIE K
