= Hizen-Kashima Station =

Railway station in Kashima, Saga Prefecture, Japan

Hizen-Kashima Station 肥前鹿島駅
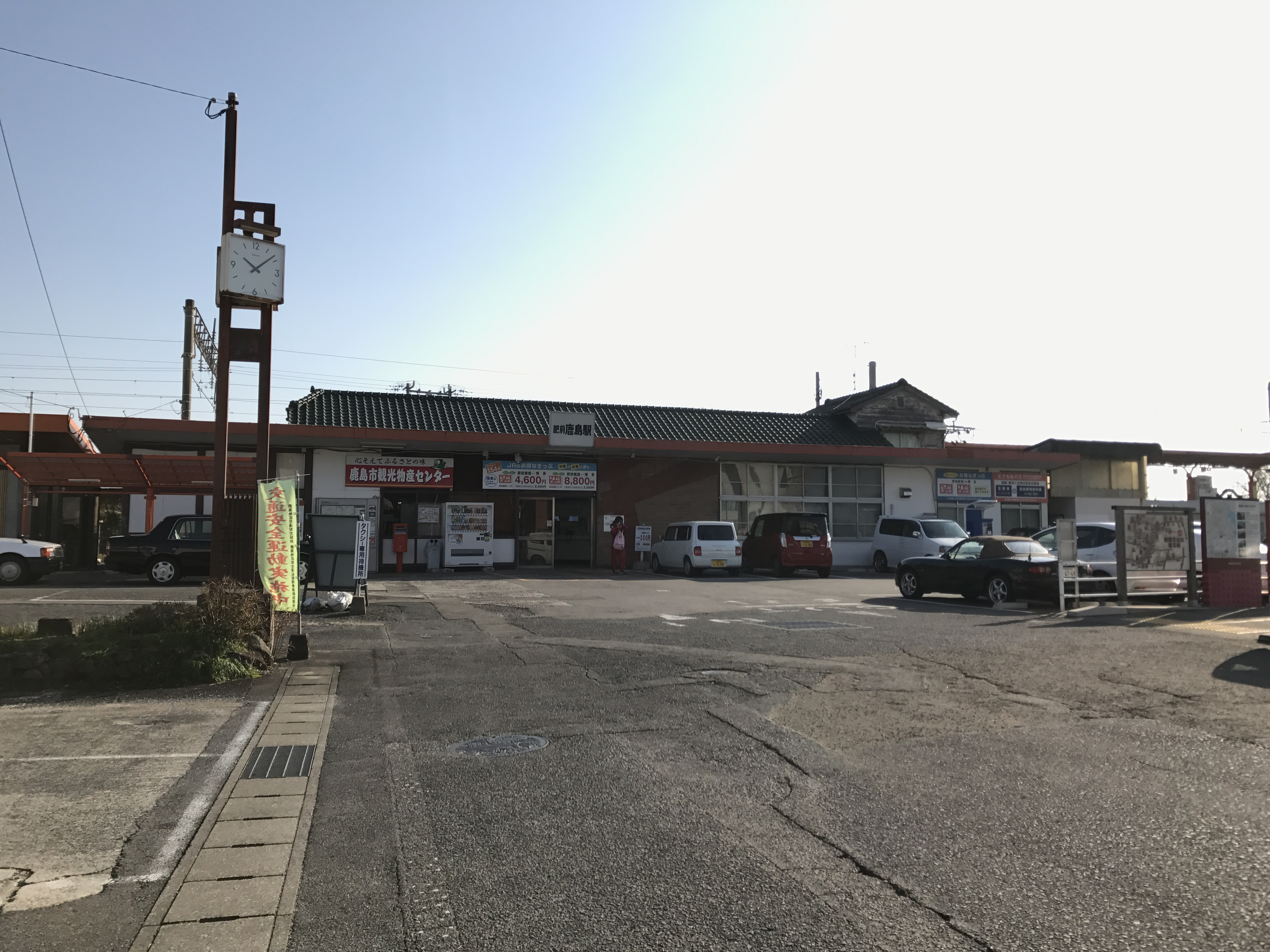
- Hizen-Kashima Station in 2016

General information
- Location: Takatsuhara, Kashima-shi, Saga-ken 849-1311; Japan
- Coordinates: 33°06′50″N 130°05′50″E
- Operator: JR Kyushu
- Line: JH Nagasaki Main Line
- Distance: 54.6 km from Tosu
- Platforms: 1 island platform
- Tracks: 2

Construction
- Structure type: At grade
- Cycle facilities: Bike shed
- Accessible: No - underpass to platform has steps

Other information
- Status: Staffed ticket window (Midori no Madoguchi) (outsourced)
- Website: Official website

History
- Opened: 30 November 1930

Passengers
- FY2020: 883 daily
- Rank: 157th (among JR Kyushu stations)

Services
Preceding station	JR Kyushu	Following station
Hizen-Hama towards Nagasaki	Nagasaki Line	Hizen-Ryūō towards Tosu
Location
- Location within Saga Prefecture Location within Japan

Hizen-Kashima Station (肥前鹿島駅, Hizenkashima-eki) is a passenger railway station located in the city of Kashima, Saga Prefecture. It is operated by JR Kyushu.

== Lines ==
The station is served by the Nagasaki Main Line and is located 54.6 km from the starting point of the line at Tosu. Besides the local services on the line, trains of the JR Kyushu Limited Express service Kamome from Hakata to Nagasaki also stop at the station.

== Station layout ==
The station consists of an island platform serving two tracks. The station building is of traditional Japanese design with a tiled roof. It houses a ticket window, a waiting room, a shop and a sales area for tourist souvenirs. Access to the island platform is by means of an underpass.

Around the time of the Kashima Gatalympics, a boat is on display, filled with mud. Small crabs and mudskippers live within this temporary environment.

Management of the station has been outsourced to the JR Kyushu Tetsudou Eigyou Co., a wholly owned subsidiary of JR Kyushu specialising in station services. It staffs the ticket window which is equipped with a Midori no Madoguchi facility.

=== Platforms ===
1	■ JH Nagasaki Main Line	for Saga and Tosu
2	■ JH Nagasaki Main Line	for Nagasaki

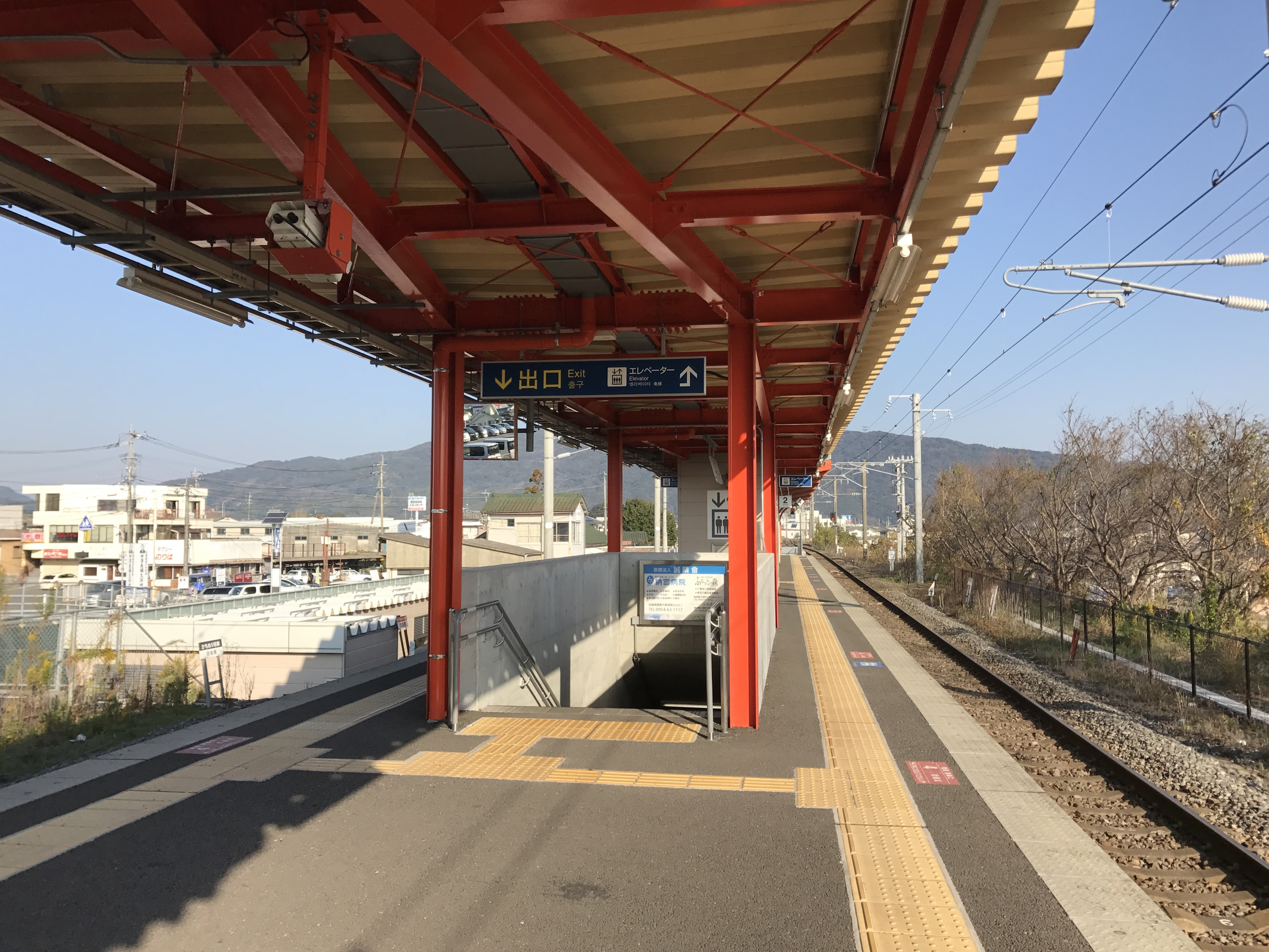
A view of the platform. Note the entrance to the underpass which leads to the station building.

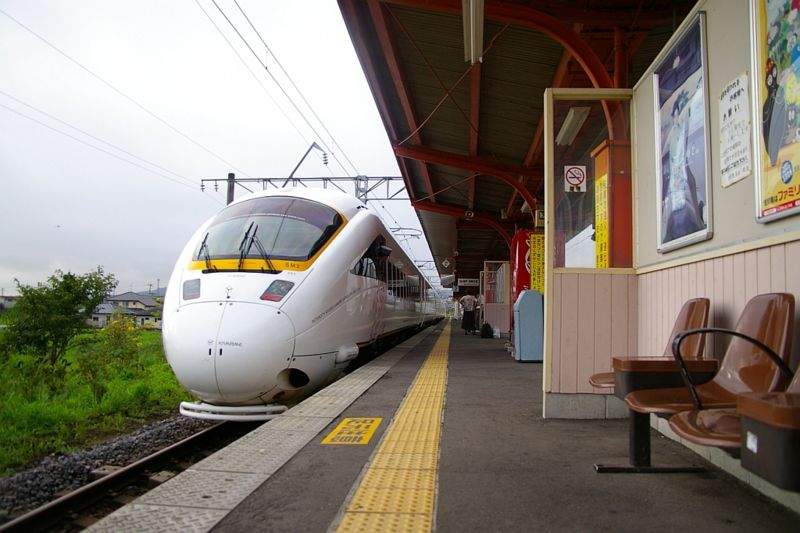
The limited express Kamome at Hizen-Kashima.

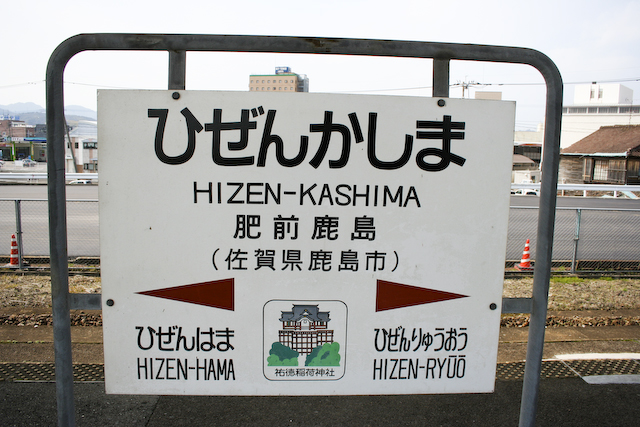
Station name board. Note the graphic of the Yūtoku Inari Shrine which is near the station.

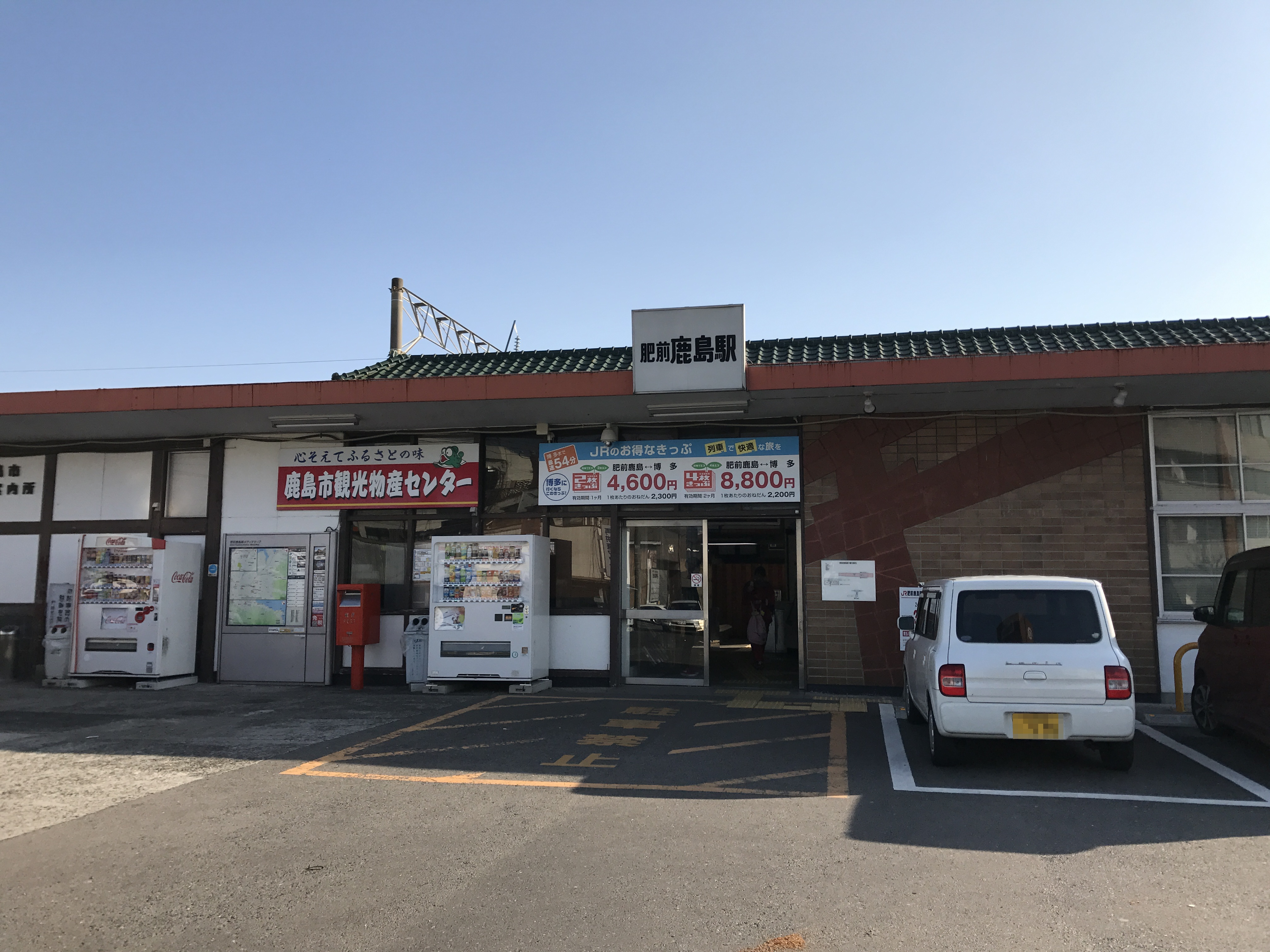
Closeup view of the station building. The sign in red advertises the tourist products centre. The gray box is an electronic tourist map of the vicinity.

== History ==
Japanese Government Railways (JGR) built the station in the 1930s during the development of an alternative route for the Nagasaki Main Line along the coast of the Ariake Sea. By March 1930, the track had been extended from Hizen-Yamaguchi to Hizen-Ryūō. In the next phase of expansion, the track was extended to Hizen-Hama which opened as the new southern terminus on 30 November 1930. Hizen-Kashima opened on the same day as an intermediate station on the track. With the privatization of Japanese National Railways (JNR), the successor of JGR, on 1 April 1987, control of the station passed to JR Kyushu.

== Passenger statistics ==
In fiscal 2020, the station was used by an average of 883 passengers daily (boarding passengers only), and it ranked 157th among the busiest stations of JR Kyushu.

== Surrounding area ==
- Yūtoku Inari Shrine. The station is the closest limited express stop to the shrine and hence there are many people arriving and departing during the Japanese New Year.
- Yūtoku Bus Center
- Japan National Route 207

== See also ==
- List of railway stations in Japan
