= Hizen-Hama Station =

Railway station in Kashima, Saga Prefecture, Japan

Hizen-Hama Station 肥前浜駅
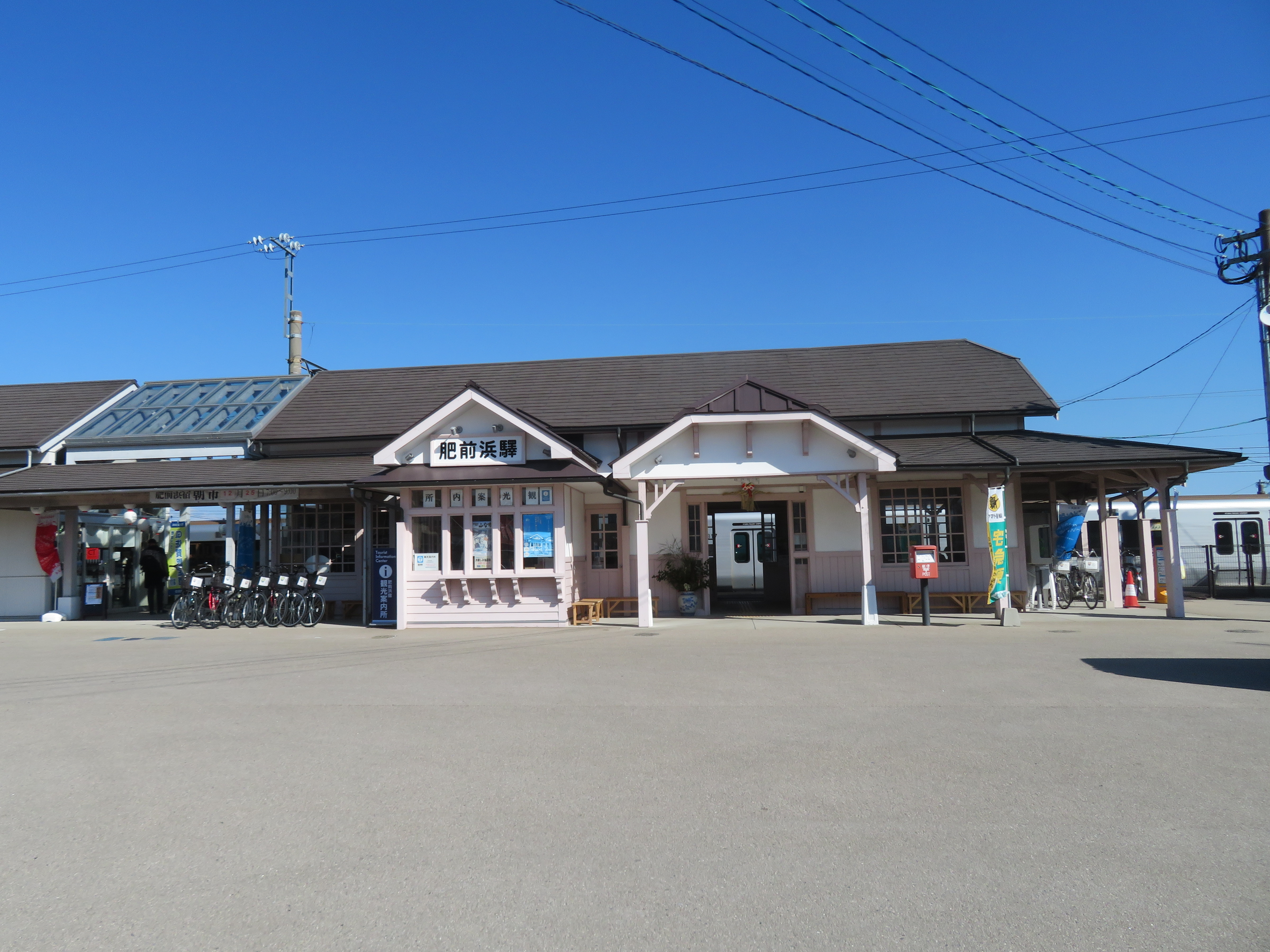
- Hizen-Hama Station in 2022

General information
- Location: Hamamachi, Kashima-shi, Saga-ken 849-1322; Japan
- Coordinates: 33°05′43″N 130°07′00″E
- Operator: JR Kyushu
- Line: JH Nagasaki Main Line
- Distance: 57.6 km from Tosu
- Platforms: 1 side + 1 island platforms
- Tracks: 3 + 1 siding

Construction
- Structure type: At grade
- Accessible: No - platforms linked by footbridge

Other information
- Status: Kan'i itaku agent onsite
- Website: Official website

History
- Opened: 30 November 1930

Passengers
- FY2016: 196 daily

Services
Preceding station	JR Kyushu	Following station
Hizen-Nanaura towards Nagasaki	Nagasaki Line	Hizen-Kashima towards Tosu
Location
- Location within Saga Prefecture Location within Japan

Hizen-Hama Station (肥前浜駅, Hizenhama-eki) is a passenger railway station in located in the city of Kashima, Saga Prefecture, Japan. It is operated by JR Kyushu.

== Lines ==
The station is served by the Nagasaki Main Line and is located 57.6 km from the starting point of the line at Tosu.

== Station layout ==
The station consists of a side platform and an island platform serving three tracks. A siding branches off track 1. The station building is an old timber building of western design and houses a waiting room and a tourist information centre. The station is unstaffed but a ticket window is managed by a Kan'i itaku agent. Only some types of tickets are sold and there is no POS machine. Access to the island platform is by means of a footbridge.

=== Platforms ===
1	■ JH Nagasaki Main Line	for Saga and Tosu
2	■ JH Nagasaki Main Line	for Nagasaki

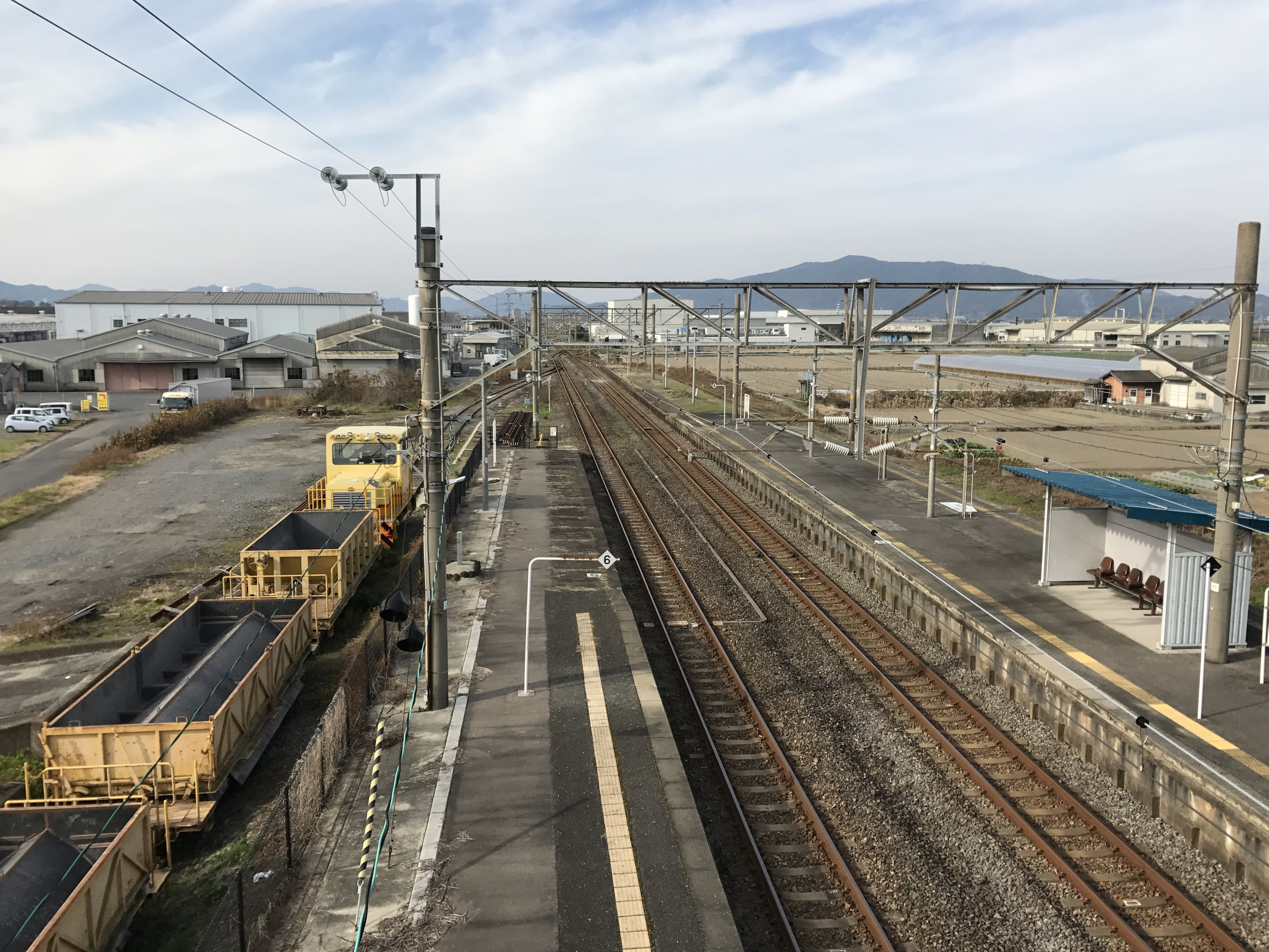
A view of the platforms and tracks. Platform 1 is to the left. Note the siding branching off track 1.

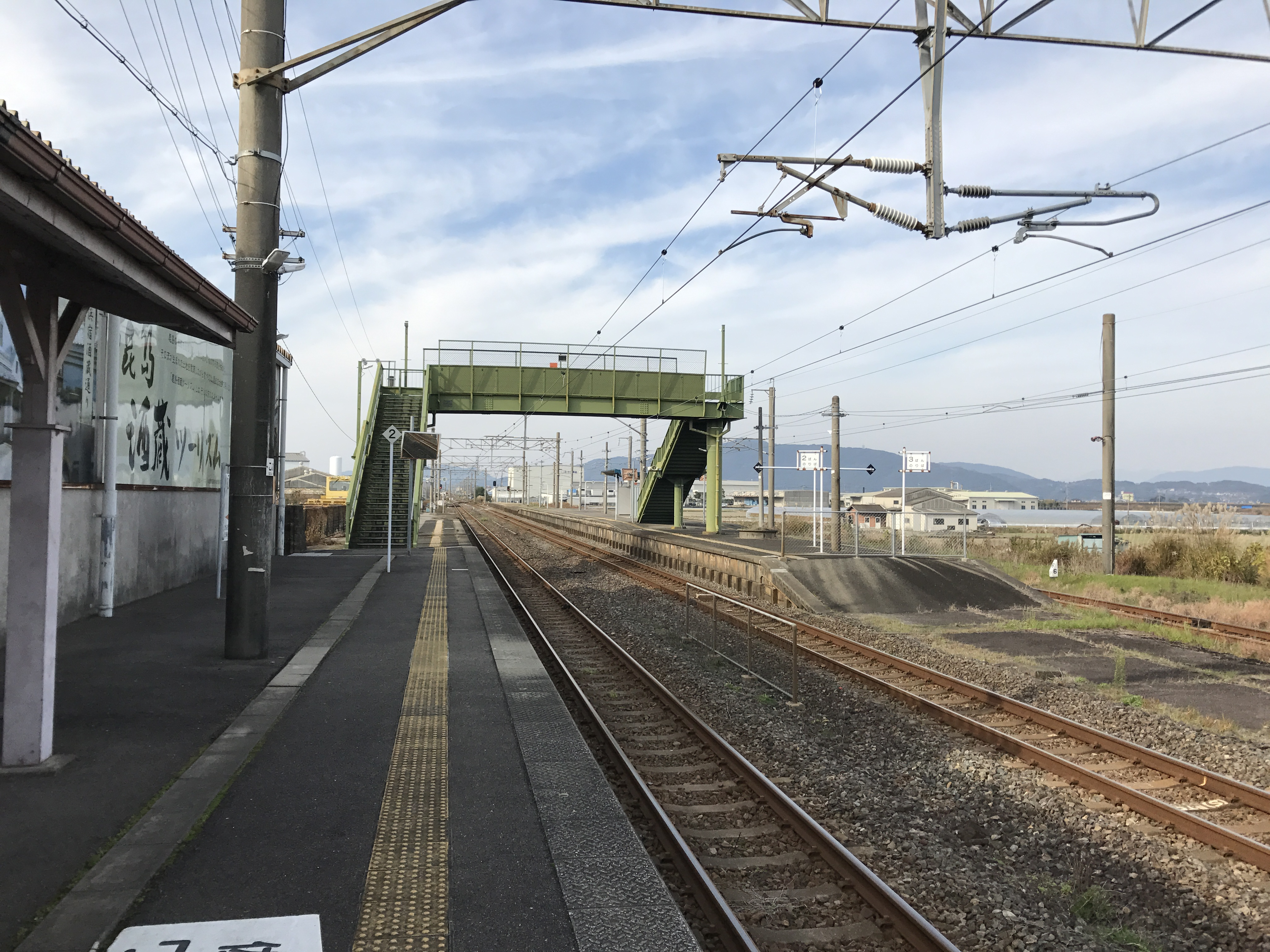
Another view of the platforms, showing the footbridge.

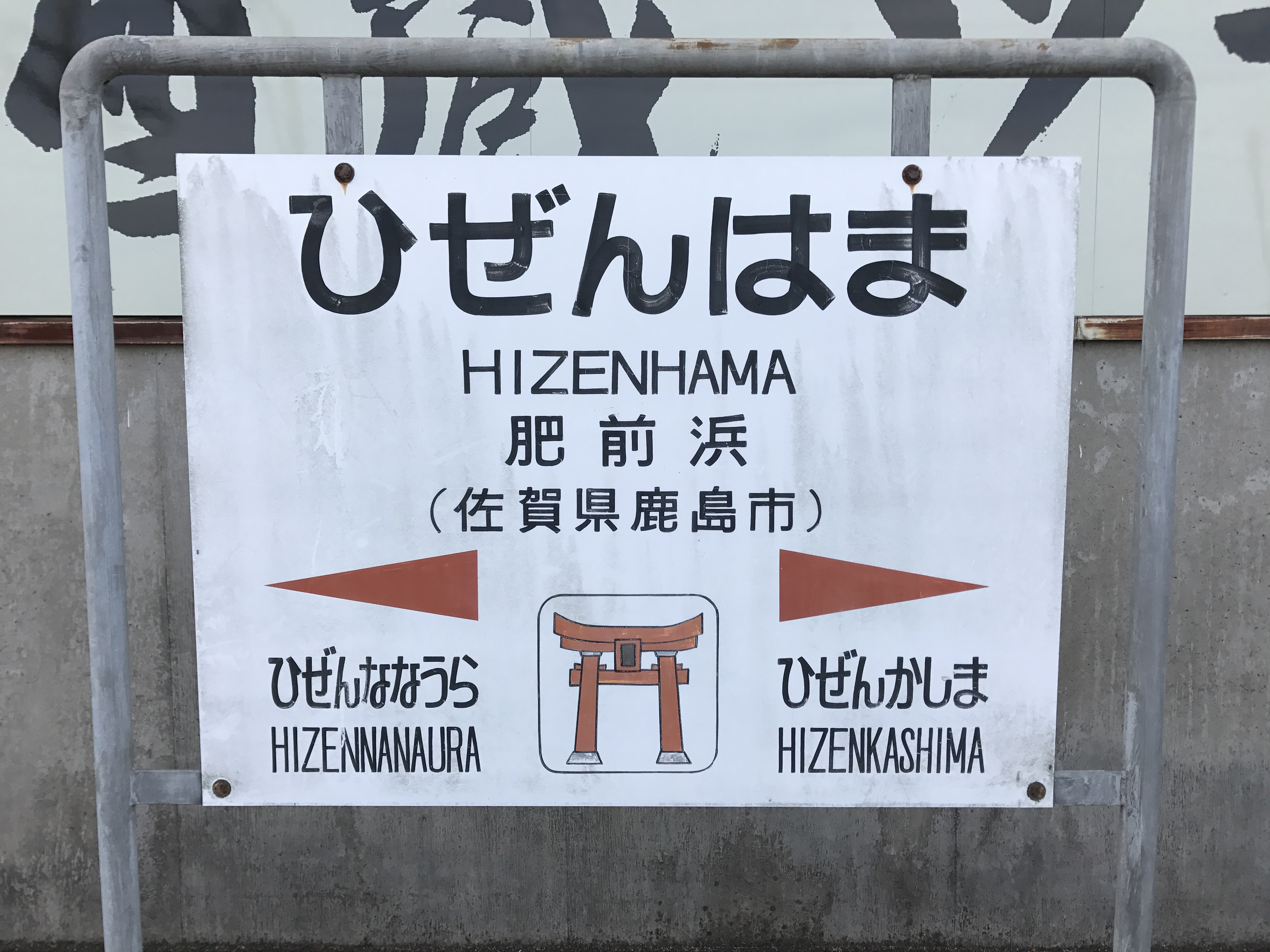
Station name board.

== History ==
Japanese Government Railways (JGR) built the station in the 1930s during the development of an alternative route for the Nagasaki Main Line along the coast of the Ariake Sea. By March 1930, the track had been extended from Hizen-Yamaguchi to Hizen-Ryūō. In the next phase of expansion, the track was extended to Hizen-Hama which opened as the new southern terminus on 30 November 1930. It became a through-station when the track was extended to Tara on 16 April 1934. With the privatization of Japanese National Railways (JNR), the successor of JGR, on 1 April 1987, control of the station passed to JR Kyushu.

== Passenger statistics ==
In fiscal 2016, the daily average number of passengers using the station (boarding passengers only) was above 100 and below 323. The station did not rank among the top 300 busiest stations of JR Kyushu.

== Surrounding area ==
- Yūtoku Inari Shrine - Japan's third biggest Inari shrine. Hizen-Hama is the closest station although the previous station Hizen-Kashima is more convenient for passengers taking a limited express train.
- Japan National Route 207

== See also ==
- List of railway stations in Japan
