= Hizen-Ryūō Station =

Railway station in Shiroishi, Saga Prefecture, Japan

Hizen-Ryūō Station 肥前竜王駅
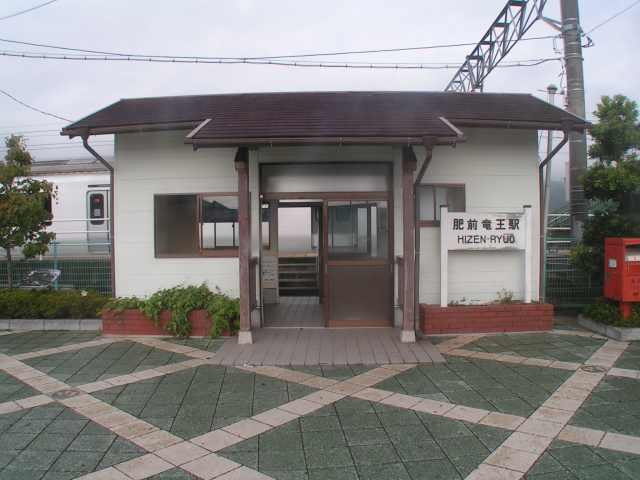
- Hizen-Ryūō Station in 2006

General information
- Location: Sakata, Shiroishi-cho, Kishima-gun, Saga-ken 849-1204; Japan
- Coordinates: 33°08′47″N 130°07′14″E
- Operator: JR Kyushu
- Line: JH Nagasaki Main Line
- Distance: 49.4 km from Tosu
- Platforms: 2 side platforms
- Tracks: 2 + 1 siding

Construction
- Structure type: At grade
- Cycle facilities: Bike shed
- Accessible: No - platforms linked by footbridge

Other information
- Status: Unstaffed
- Website: Official website

History
- Opened: 9 March 1930

Passengers
- FY2016: 154 daily

Services
Preceding station	JR Kyushu	Following station
Hizen-Kashima towards Nagasaki	Nagasaki Line	Hizen-Shiroishi towards Tosu
Location
- Location within Saga Prefecture Location within Japan

Hizen-Ryūō Station (肥前竜王駅, Hizenryuuou-eki) is a passenger railway station in located in the town of Shiroishi, Kishima District, Saga Prefecture, Japan. It is operated by JR Kyushu.

== Lines ==
The station is served by the Nagasaki Main Line and is located 49.4 km from the starting point of the line at Tosu.

== Station layout ==
The station consists of two side platforms serving two tracks. A siding branches off track 1. The station building, a simple concrete structure, is unstaffed and serves only as a waiting room. Access to the opposite side platform is by means of a footbridge.

=== Platforms ===
1	■ JH Nagasaki Main Line	for Saga and Tosu
2	■ JH Nagasaki Main Line	for Nagasaki

== History ==
Japanese Government Railways (JGR) built the station in the 1930s during the development of an alternative route for the Nagasaki Main Line along the coast of the Ariake Sea. In the first phase of construction, the track was extended south from Hizen-Yamaguchi with Hizen-Ryūō opening on 9 March 1930 as the southern terminus. It became a through station on 30 November 1930 when the track was extended to Hizen-Hama. With the privatization of Japanese National Railways (JNR), the successor of JGR, on 1 April 1987, control of the station passed to JR Kyushu.

== Passenger statistics ==
In fiscal 2016, the daily average number of passengers using the station (boarding passengers only) was above 100 and below 323. The station did not rank among the top 300 busiest stations of JR Kyushu.

== Surrounding area ==
The town proper of the former municipality of Ariake is to the northeast of the station.

- Shiroishi City Hall
- Ariake Junior High School
- Japan National Route 207

== See also ==
- List of railway stations in Japan
