= 中原 =

Chinese name
- Traditional Chinese: 中原
Transcriptions
Standard Mandarin
- Hanyu Pinyin: Zhongyuan
- Wade–Giles: Chung Yuan

Korean name
- Hangul: 중원
- Hanja: 中原

Japanese name
- Kanji: 中原
- Kana: なかはら, ちゅうげん, なかばる
Transcriptions
- Romanization: Nakahara, Chugen, Nakabaru

中原 may refer to:

- Zhongyuan (disambiguation) (Mandarin Chinese: 中原, romanized: Chung Yuan, lit. 'Central Plains')
- Nakahara (disambiguation) (Japanese: 中原, lit. 'Central Plain')
- Chūgen Railway (Japanese: 中原鉄道, romanized: Chūgen Tetsudō), Gunma, Japan
- Nakabaru, Saga, Japan (Japanese: 中原町, romanized: Nakabaru-chō) a town
- Nakabaru Station (Japanese: 中原駅, romanized: Nakabaru-eki), Miyaki, Saga, Japan; a train station
- 中原区 (disambiguation) (中原 district)

== See also ==
- Central Plain (disambiguation) (Chinese and Japanese: 中原; C: Zhongyuan; J: Nakahara)
