= Wednesday Strangler =

Unidentified Japanese serial killer

- Other name: Saga Women Murders

Details
- Victims: 7
- Span of crimes: 1975–1989
- Country: Japan
- State: Saga
- Date apprehended: Suspect arrested 2002, but acquitted 2005

The Wednesday Strangler is an unidentified Japanese serial killer, responsible for the murders of seven women in Saga Prefecture between 1975 and 1989. The nickname comes from the fact that six of the victims disappeared on a Wednesday. The killings are also referred to as the Saga Women Murders.

Three of the murder cases (of the fifth through seventh victims, in 1989) were prosecuted under the "Kitagata Affair". However, the man was found to be innocent and promptly acquitted, leaving the cases unsolved.

== Overview ==
Between 1975 and 1989, seven murders occurred in a 20-kilometer radius of the Saga Prefecture, in the towns of Kitagata, Shiroishi, Kitashigeyasu and Takeo. All of them had the following characteristics.

1. In six of the seven cases, the victims disappeared on a Wednesday (the second victim disappeared on a Saturday)
2. Vanished during the evening or night hours
3. Five of the deaths were due to strangulation (the remaining two were skeletonized, and the causes of death couldn't be ascertained)
4. In six of the seven cases, the victims were violated due to some or all of their clothes being removed (the third victim was still wearing the clothes she wore on the day she disappeared)

For the fourth case, the statute of limitations expired, because of which the investigating agency couldn't prosecute the criminal. The remaining three were indicted, but were acquitted during the trial, and all seven of the murders remain unsolved.

In March 2005, Kitashigeyasu, along with Nakabaru and Mine, merged with to become the city of Miyaki. Also, in March 2006, Kitagata was merged with Takeo.

=== Murders ===
1. On August 27, 1975, a 12-year-old junior high school student living in Kitagata, named Tomiko Yamasaki, disappeared from her home, last seen alive by a friend she had invited over. Her skeletal remains were found on June 27, 1980, in one of the poolside septic tanks at Suko Elementary School in Shiroishi, Saga, while the police were searching for clues about the second victim, who had just been found 3 days prior. On June 18, the school, while preparing to open the pool, wanted to drain the septic tank of the poolside toilets, but the workers discovered stones in the tank. The police knew what the staff meant, and upon inspecting the tank (per the staff's request), they found Tomiko's skeletonized remains under a pile of said stones. Both victims were taken to Kurume University.
2. On April 12, 1980, a 19-year-old living in the town of Shiroishi, named Ritsuko Hyakutake, disappeared in the same circumstances as Tomiko. After she disappeared, her family had received letter written in old kana orthography; the first line has not been made public due to private family concerns, but the second line states she "isn't coming back" and that the writer wants them to "Suffer". At the same time, the family also received phone calls from who they described as a "young-sounding man", who threatened them to not show anything related to Ritsuko or her disappearance to the media. About 2 months later, on June 24 (3 days before Tomiko was found), her decomposing body was found dead floating face-up under a manhole at Suko Elementary School, the same elementary school where Tomiko was found. This is the only murder to not have occurred on a Wednesday - instead, it was on a Saturday.
3. On October 7, 1981, a 27-year-old factory employee, named Chizuko Ikegami, also living in Shiroishi, disappeared. On October 21, her strangled body was found in a vacant lot in Nakabaru, Saga. She was the only victim to not be violated as she was wearing the same work clothes she was wearing when she disappeared.
4. On February 17, 1982, a 11-year-old fifth grader (whose name remains undisclosed) was strangled to death in Kitashigeyasu, Saga while walking home to school, last seen alive by a fellow student. After her parents failed to find her, the police and the fire brigade worked through the night to search for her, having considered how she disappeared near where Chizuko was found murdered. She was found the next day on February 18 behind a mandarin plantation just north of Kitashigeyasu Junior High School's gymnasium and less than 2 kilometers from where Chizuko had been found, leading to the police to believe that the cases were linked. She was the youngest victim in the killings and the only victim whose name was never revealed to the public, though some have speculated that her first name was "Kumi" and her last name started with "Nishi". Some time prior, a man, said to be in his 30s, was spotted in various locations before the fifth grader's death. Around the same day as the fifth grader was found, a friend of hers received a brief call from a woman pretending to be her. The following day, a postcard with an incomplete message stated that the writer intended to hold her for ransom, but ending up killing her after she made a fuss; although it didn't match the writing to the letter concerning Ritsuko, the police still believed that there was some sort of connection between the four cases.
5. On July 8, 1987, a 48-year-old restaurant employee in Takeo, named Sumiko Fujise, disappeared mysteriously. She was found dead 2 years later, on January 27, 1989, beneath a cliff at Kitagata Otoge. The following two bodies were found in the same location, and all three are collectively known as the "Kitagata Affair".
6. On December 7, 1988, 50-year-old housewife named Kiyomi Nakajima disappeared from Kitagata, last seen alive by a local who saw her with a bicyclist. A week later, her husband, Tadao, and an officer stationed at the family's home got a phone call from a mysterious man speaking in a Saga and Kansai dialect, who claims to have found Kiyomi near a mountain pass nicknamed "Yakigome" and claims to be someone that the family knows. Following this, the home and the post office that Tadao worked at kept getting silent phone calls, possibly from the same person.
7. On January 25, 1989, a 37-year-old office worker based in Kitamachi, named Tatsuyo Yoshino, also disappeared, claiming to be helping a friend on the night she left. She happened to work at the same company that Chizuko worked at. On the same day she was found, the police found her car at Takeo Bowl. A female office worker then came forward, claiming to have seen her entering a white Toyota Cresta.

=== Kitagata Affair ===
Around 5 PM on January 27, 1989, a couple driving near a mountain forest in the Kishima District found three female bodies dropped beneath a cliff while trying to grab a tougoshu flower for a Buddhist altar, and reported it to the police. The victims were identified as Sumiko Fujise, housewife Kiyomi Nakajima (who was 1 meter away from Sumiko), and office worker Tatsuyo Yoshino (who was 2 meters away from Kiyomi). It is believed that they were killed on July 8, 1987; December 7, 1988; and the last on January 25, two days before the bodies were found. Items belonging to the victims were allegedly discarded within a 2-mile radius of the site where the bodies were found. The upper part of Kiyomi's body had decomposed significantly, while Sumiko was now a skeleton.

In November of the same year, a 26-year-old man, who had been detained for an unconnected crime, admitted to three of the murders during a cognitive interview, but later recanted the confession. On June 11, 2002, the Saga Prefecture police charged the prisoner with the murder of Y., while he was incarcerated in Kagoshima Prison, later charging him with the other ones. The indictment was filed on July 7, approximately six hours before the statute of limitations for the murder expired. On October 22, the trial began, with the prosecution arguing in favor of the death penalty. On April 10, 2005, the Saga District Court cited lack of conclusive evidence and coercion by the interrogating officers for their reasoning for finding the defendant innocent of all charges.

The prosecution appealed the decision, but the Fukuoka High Court acquitted him on March 19, 2007, as was the case with the Saga District Court in the first instance. In the second trial, the prosecution tried to use newly obtained mitochondrial DNA for any possible connections to the victims, but again, the defendant was cleared. In the judgment, the Saga Prefectural Police admitted to conducting a poor investigation, including over-interrogating the suspect. On March 29, the Fukuoka department of the Supreme Public Prosecutors' Office found numerous case violations relating to the prosecutors' appeal, which was overturned, also taking into account the scarce evidence. No appeal was made after the April 2nd deadline, and the defendant was acquitted. As a result, the statute of limitations for the four cases expired, and they remain unsolved to this day. The accused criticized the Saga Prefectural Police and the prosecutor's poor investigation and prosecution, as pointed out in the ruling of the second trial.

== Victims ==
- Tomiko Yamasaki, 12
- Ritsuko Hyakutake, 19
- Chizuko Ikegami, 27
- Unnamed female, 11
- Sumiko Fujise, 48
- Kiyomi Nakajima, 50
- Tatsuyo Yoshino, 37

== Supplements ==
- Other examples of faulty prosecution and vacation of the death penalty in Japan include, as shown from Supreme Court statistics from 1958 onward, include the 1961 Nabari poison wine incident. The 41-year-old suspect was acquitted by the Tsu District Court in 1964, but his appeal for the death sentence was only finalized in 1972. Requests for a retrial have been repeatedly filed.
- Another would be the so-called "Shimada Case", where the defendant was acquitted before the Shizuoka District Court upon retrial in 1989. It was one of the four major miscarriages of justice in the 1980s, the Kitagata Affair was the 9th case of the post-war period, 16 years after the Shimada Case.
- This case was the first acquittal before the Supreme Court since 1978. However, the first and second instances concerning the Tsuchida bombings, the accused was acquitted and spared the death penalty, but found guilty of larceny. He was given a year of imprisonment, and a suspended sentence of 2 years.
- On March 20, 2007, following the acquittal from both courts, the Fukuoka Bar Association issued a statement calling for the realization of recorded interviews between authorities and suspects.

== See also ==
- Capital punishment in Japan
- List of miscarriage of justice cases
- Acquittal
- List of fugitives from justice who disappeared
- List of serial killers by country
- North Kanto Serial Young Girl Kidnapping and Murder Case
