= Yoshinogari =

Yoshinogari may refer to:

- Yoshinogari, Saga, a town in Japan
- Yoshinogari site, a prehistoric site located in Yoshinogari, Saga, Japan
