= Kamimine =

Kamimine 上峰町
- Town
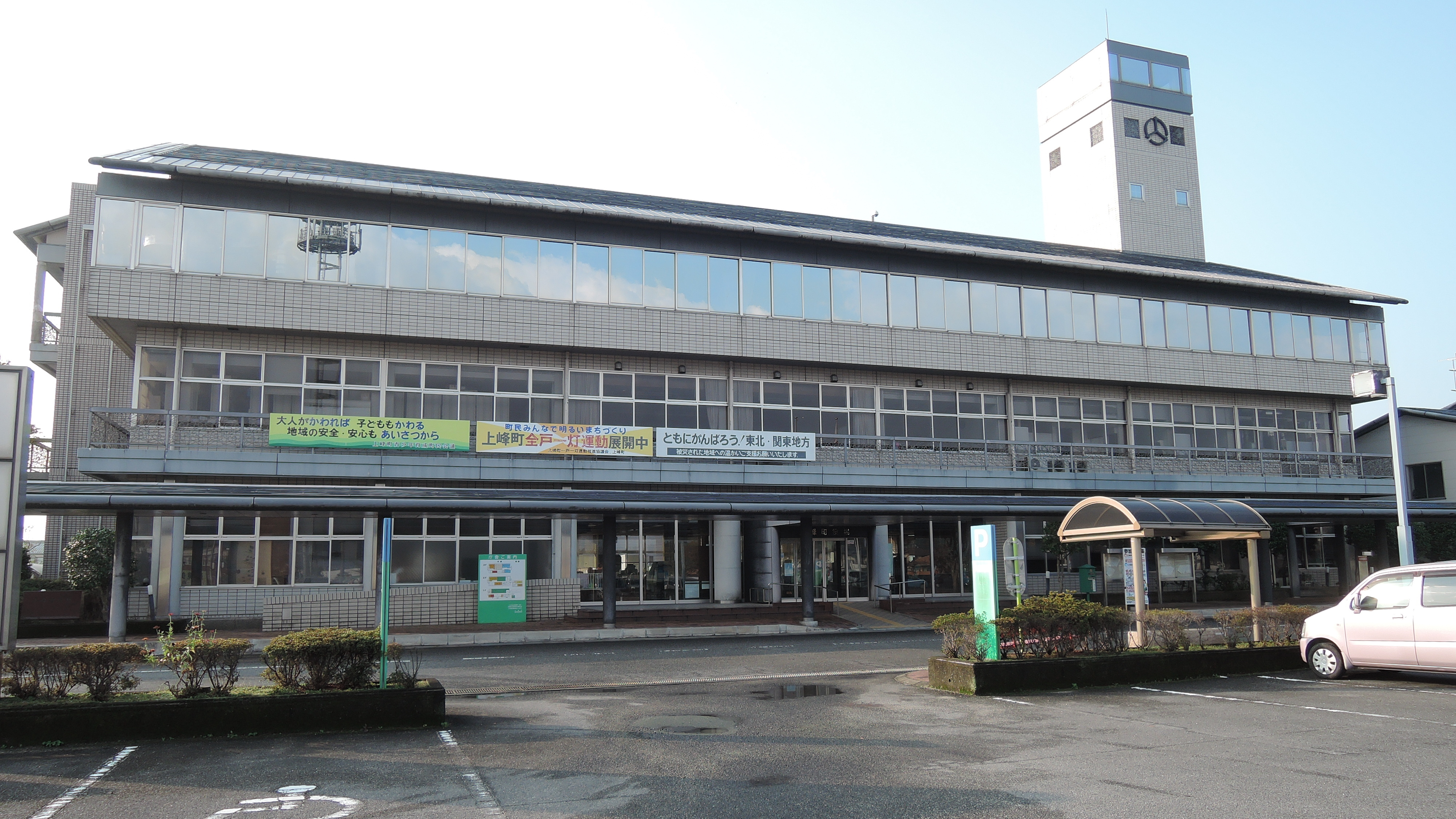
- Kamimine town hall

- Flag Emblem

- Location in Japan
- Coordinates: 33°19′11″N 130°25′34″E
- Country: Japan
- Region: Kyushu
- Prefecture: Saga
- District: Miyaki

Area
  - Total: 12.80 km^{2} (4.94 sq mi)

Population (April 30, 2024)
  - Total: 9,806
  - Density: 766.1/km^{2} (1,984/sq mi)
- Time zone: UTC+09:00 (JST)
- City hall address: 383-1 Bōsho, Kamimine-chō, Miyaki-gun, Saga-ken 849-0123
- Website: Official website
- Symbols
- Flower: Scarlet Sage
- Tree: Camellia

Kamimine (上峰町, Kamimine-chō) is a town located in Miyaki District, Saga Prefecture, Japan. As of 30 April 2024, the town had an estimated population of 9806 in 3954 households, and a population density of 770 people per km^{2}. The total area of the town is 12.80 km^{2} (4.94 sq mi).

== Geography ==
Kamimine is located in the eastern part of Saga Prefecture about 15 kilometres (9.3 mi) east of central Saga, the capital city. It is also about 15 kilometres (9.3 mi) west of Kurume, a major city in Fukuoka Prefecture. There is a lot of flat land in Kamimine as the town area consists largely of the Saga Plains. However, the northern part of town contains Mount Chinzei.

=== Adjoining municipalities ===
Saga Prefecture

- Miyaki
- Yoshinogari

=== Climate ===
Kamimine has a humid subtropical climate (Köppen Cfa) characterized by warm summers and cool winters with light to no snowfall. The average annual temperature in Kamimine is 14.7 °C. The average annual rainfall is 1946 mm with September as the wettest month. The temperatures are highest on average in August, at around 25.7 °C, and lowest in January, at around 3.9 °C.

=== Demographics ===
Per Japanese census data, the population of Kamimine is as shown below.

Historical population
Year	Pop.	±%
1940	3,434	—
1950	4,721	+37.5%
1960	4,908	+4.0%
1970	5,143	+4.8%
1980	6,682	+29.9%
1990	7,534	+12.8%
2000	8,672	+15.1%
2010	9,224	+6.4%
2020	9,286	+0.7%

== History ==
The area of Kaminine was part of ancient Hizen Province. During the Edo Period, it was mostly part of the holdings of Saga Domain. Following the Meiji restoration, the village of Kamimine was established with the creation of the modern municipalities system on April 1, 1889. On November 1, 1989, was raised to town status.

== Government ==
Kamimine has a mayor-council form of government with a directly elected mayor and a unicameral town council of 10 members. Kamimine, collectively with the other municipalities of Miyaki District, contributes two members to the Saga Prefectural Assembly. In terms of national politics, the city is part of the Saga 1st district of the lower house of the Diet of Japan.

== Economy ==
The economy of Kamimine is overwhelmingly based on agriculture, mostly rice production.

== Education ==
Kamimine has one public elementary school and one public junior high school by the town government. The town does not have a high school.

== Transportation ==
=== Railways ===
The Nagasaki Main Line runs through Kamimine, but there are no stations within the town borders. The closest station is Yoshinogari-kōen Station on the JR Kyushu Nagasaki Main Line in neighboring Yoshinogari.

=== Highways ===
The Nagasaki Expressway runs through Kamimine, but there are no interchanges within the town borders. The closest interchange is the Higashisefuri Interchange in neighboring Yoshinogari.

- National Route 34

== Sister cities ==
- Yeoju, Gyeonggi Province, South Korea
