= Ayabe =

Ayabe may refer to:

== Places in Japan ==
- Ayabe, Kyoto, a city
  - Ayabe Station, a railway station
- Ayabe Domain, a feudal domain during the Edo period

== People ==
- Kakeru Ayabe (born 1997), Japanese baseball player
- Kaz Ayabe (born 1965), Japanese video game developer
- Kitsuju Ayabe (1894–1980), Japanese general
- Takeaki Ayabe (born 1980), Japanese cyclist

== Other uses ==
- Ayabe Shrine, a shrine in Miyaki, Saga, Japan
