= Nakahara =

Nakahara may refer to:

== Japanese topics ==
- Nakahara (surname) (Japanese: 中原,仲原) Japanese surname
- Nakahara-ku, Kawasaki (Japanese: 中原区), a ward of Kawasaki, Japan
- Nakahara Prize (Japanese: 中原賞), a prize awarded by the Japanese Economic Association

== Other uses ==
- Nakahara, Uttar Pradesh, India; a village

== Other uses ==
- The dictionary definition of 中原 at Wiktionary
- The dictionary definition of 仲原 at Wiktionary
- Zhongyuan (disambiguation) (Chinese: 中原, romanized: zhong-yuan), the Chinese equivalent
