= Higashisefuri, Saga =

Dissolved municipality in Saga prefecture, Japan

Higashisefuri (東脊振村, Higashisefuri-son) was a village located in Kanzaki District, Saga Prefecture, Japan.

As of 2003, the village had an estimated population of 6,507 and a population density of 196.65 persons per km^{2}. The total area was 33.09 km^{2}.

On March 1, 2006, Higashisefuri, along with the town of Mitagawa (also from Kanzaki District), was merged to create the town of Yoshinogari.
