= Zhongyuan (disambiguation) =

Zhongyuan (Chinese: 中原, lit. 'Central Plain') or the Central Plain, is the area on the lower reaches of the Yellow River which formed the cradle of Chinese civilization.

Zhongyuan may also refer to:

== Mainland China ==
- Zhongyuan Mandarin, dialect of Mandarin Chinese spoken on the Central Plain
- Zhongyuan Airlines, former airline based in Henan
- Zhongyuan District, Zhengzhou
- Zhongyuan, Hainan, town in Qionghai
- Zhongyuan, Shaanxi, town in Hanbin District, Ankang
- West Zhongyuan Road Subdistrict (中原西路街道), formerly Zhongyuan Township, in Zhongyuan District, Zhengzhou
- Zhongyuan Township, Gansu, in Zhenyuan County
- Zhongyuan Township, Jiangxi (中源乡), in Jing'an County
- Zhongyuan Festival (中元节), a Taoist holiday

== Taiwan ==
- Chung Yuan Christian University (Mandarin Chinese: 中原大學, romanized: Zhōngyuán Dàxué), in Zhongli, Taoyuan County, Taiwan
- Zhongyuan metro station, station of the Taipei Metro

== Other uses ==
- Nakahara (disambiguation) (Japanese: 中原), the Japanese equivalent
- Central Plain (disambiguation) (Japanese & Chinese: 中原; C: Zongyuan; J: Nakahara)
