= Nakabaru Station =

Railway station in Miyaki, Saga Prefecture, Japan

JH 04 Nakabaru Station 中原駅
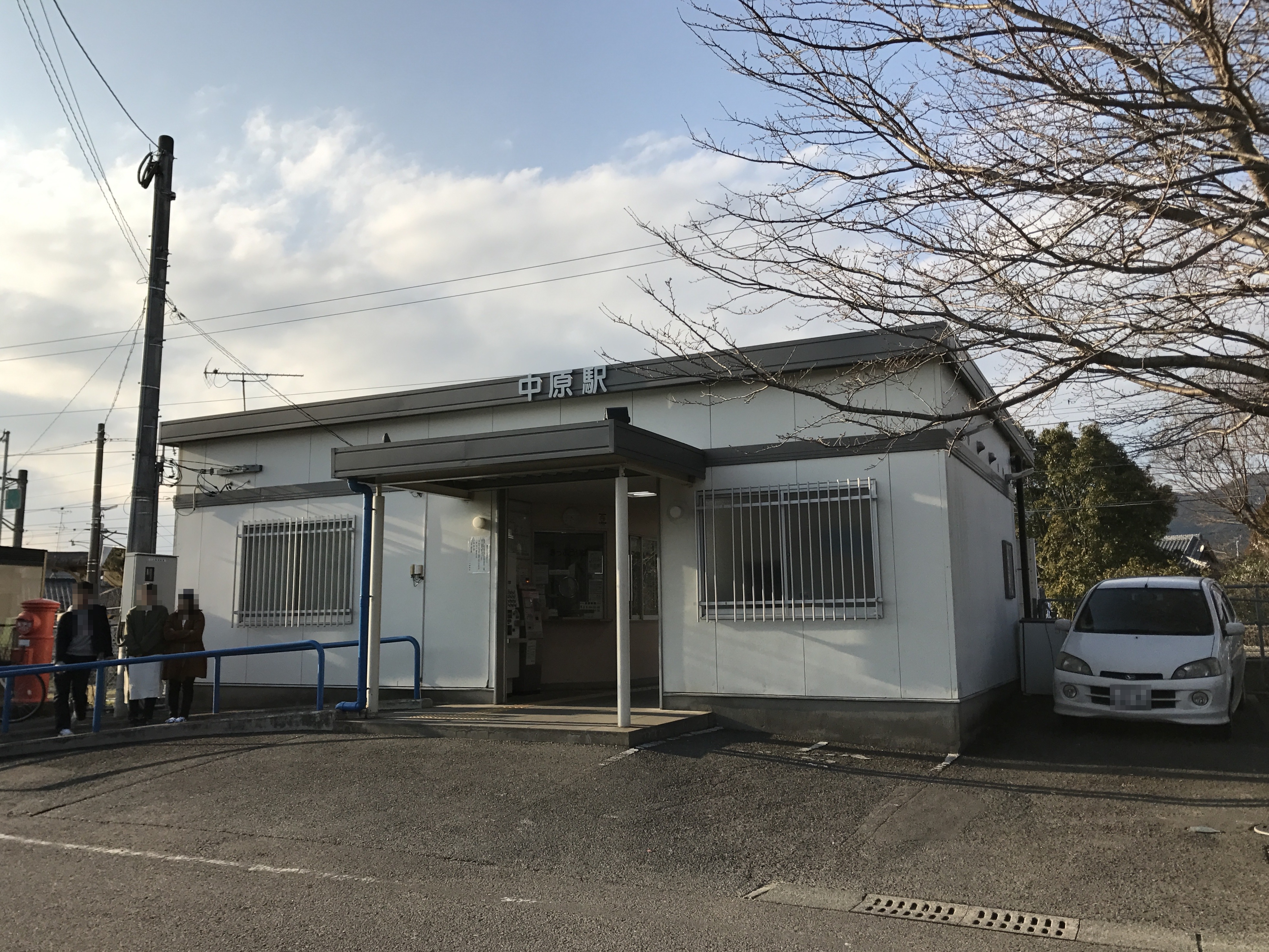
- Nakabaru Station in 2017

General information
- Location: Harukoga, Miyaki-cho, Miyaki-gun, Saga-ken 849-0101; Japan
- Coordinates: 33°20′46″N 130°26′24″E
- Operator: JR Kyushu
- Line: JH Nagasaki Main Line
- Distance: 8.5 km from Tosu
- Platforms: 1 side + 1 island platforms
- Tracks: 3 + 1 siding

Construction
- Structure type: At grade
- Accessible: No - platforms linked by footbridge

Other information
- Status: Staffed ticket window (outsourced)
- Website: Official website

History
- Opened: 20 August 1891

Passengers
- FY2022: 920 daily
- Rank: 143rd (among JR Kyushu stations)

Services
Preceding station	JR Kyushu	Following station
Yoshinogari-kōen towards Nagasaki	Nagasaki Line	Hizen-Fumoto towards Tosu
Location
- Location within Saga Prefecture Location within Japan

Nakabaru Station (中原駅, Nakabaru-eki) is a passenger railway station located in the town of Miyaki, Miyaki District, Saga Prefecture, Japan. It is operated by JR Kyushu and is on the Nagasaki Main Line.

== Lines ==
The station is served by the Nagasaki Main Line and is located 8.5 km from the starting point of the line at Tosu.

== Station layout ==
The station consists of a side platform and an island platform serving three tracks with a siding branching off track 1. A small station building of concrete construction houses a waiting area, a staffed ticket window and automatic ticket vending machines. Access to the island platform is by means of a footbridge.

Management of the station has been outsourced to the JR Kyushu Tetsudou Eigyou Co., a wholly owned subsidiary of JR Kyushu specialising in station services. It staffs the ticket window which is equipped with a POS machine but does not have a Midori no Madoguchi facility.

=== Platforms ===
1	■ JH Nagasaki Main Line	for Saga and Nagasaki
2, 3	■ JH Nagasaki Main Line	for Tosu

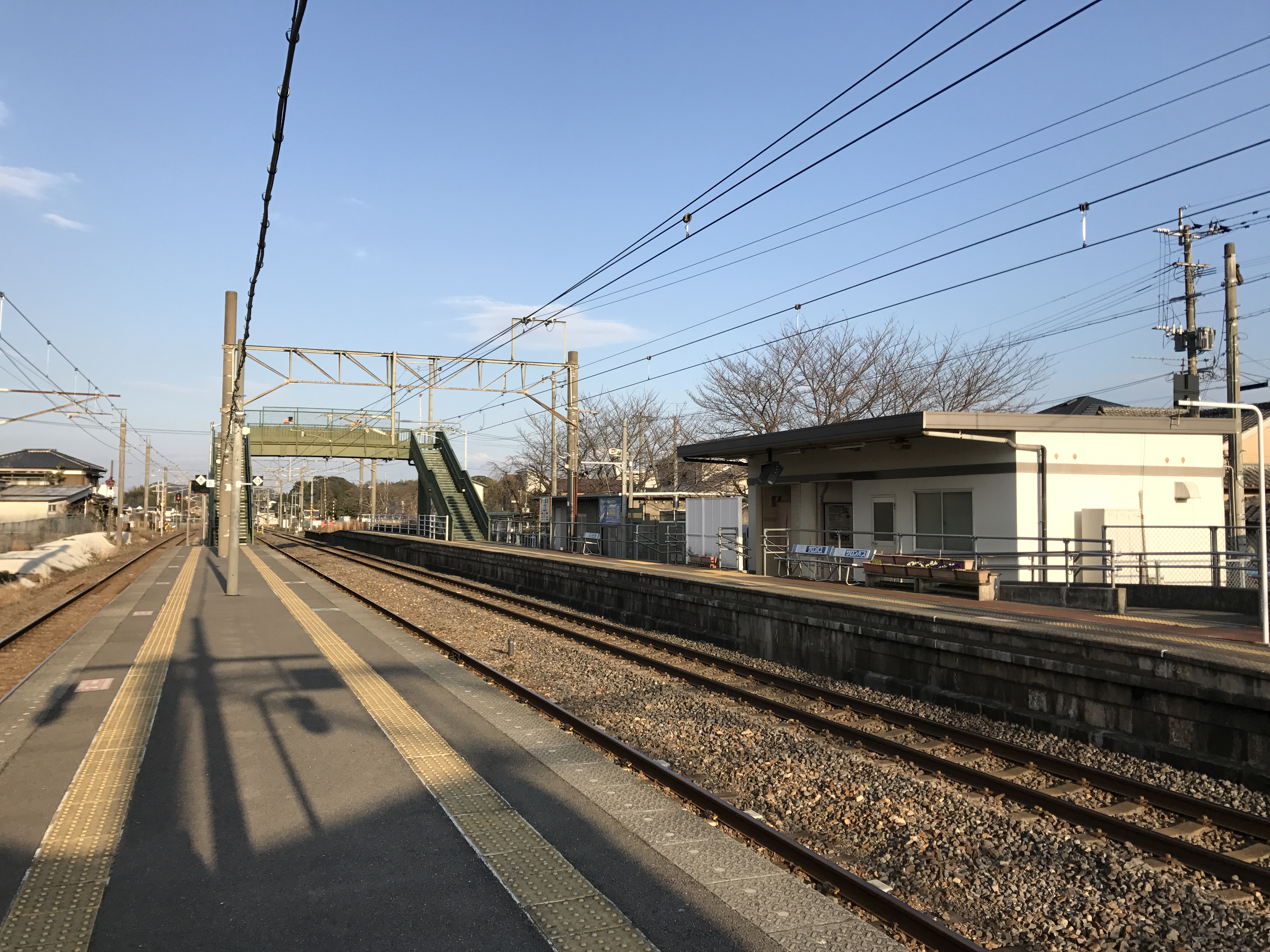
A view of the platforms and tracks.

== History ==
The station was opened on 20 August 1891 by the private Kyushu Railway as an intermediate station on a track which it opened between Tosu and Saga. When the Kyushu Railway was nationalized on 1 July 1907, Japanese Government Railways (JGR) took over control of the station. On 12 October 1909, the station became part of the Nagasaki Main Line. The With the privatization of Japanese National Railways (JNR), the successor of JGR, on 1 April 1987, control of the station passed to JR Kyushu.

== Passenger statistics ==
In fiscal 2020, the station was used by an average of 920 passengers daily (boarding passengers only), and it ranked 143rd among the busiest stations of JR Kyushu.

== Surrounding area ==
The station is in a residential district.

- Miyaki Town Nakabaru Government Building
- Ayabe Shrine (enshrining the wind god)
- Saga Prefectural Miyaki High School
- Saga Prefectural Nakahara Special Needs School

== See also ==
- List of railway stations in Japan
