= Mitagawa, Saga =

Dissolved municipality in Saga prefecture, Japan

Mitagawa (三田川町, Mitagawa-chō) was a town located in Kanzaki District, Saga Prefecture, Japan. The status of this municipality was changed from a village to a town on April 1, 1965.

As of 2003, the town had an estimated population of 9,492 and a density of 874.84 persons per km^{2}. The total area of the town was 10.85 km^{2}.

On March 1, 2006, Mitagawa, along with the village of Higashisefuri (also from Kanzaki District), was merged to create the town of Yoshinogari.
