= Miyaki, Saga =

Miyaki みやき町
- Town
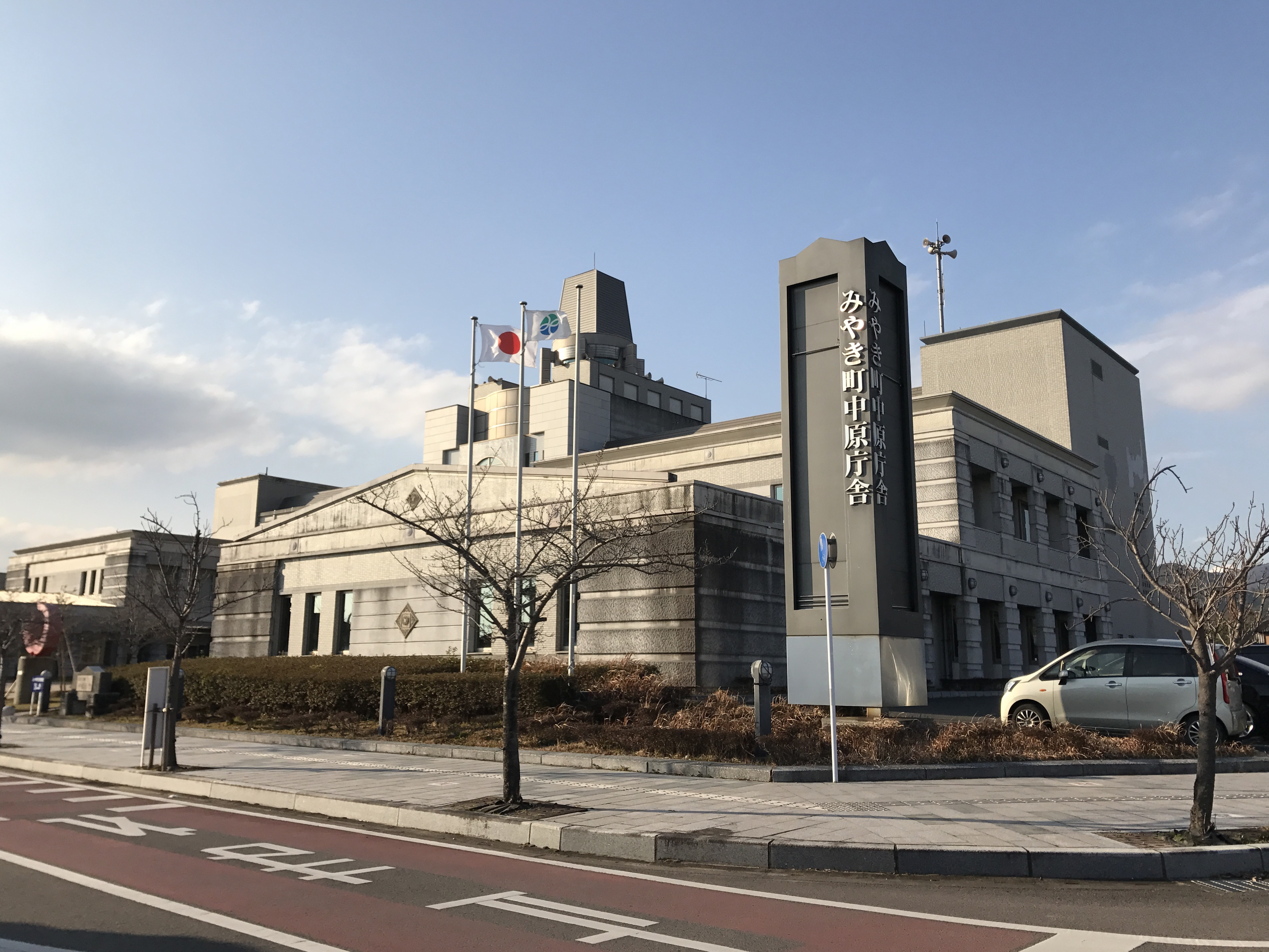
- Nakabaru Branch of Miyaki Town Hall

- Flag Emblem
- Interactive map of Miyaki
- Location in Japan
- Coordinates: 33°19′30″N 130°27′17″E
- Country: Japan
- Region: Kyushu
- Prefecture: Saga
- District: Miyaki

Area
  - Total: 51.92 km^{2} (20.05 sq mi)

Population (April 30, 2024)
  - Total: 25,745
  - Density: 495.9/km^{2} (1,284/sq mi)
- Time zone: UTC+09:00 (JST)
- City hall address: 737-5 Higashio, Miyaki-chō, Miyaki-gun, Saga-ken 849-0113
- Website: Official website
- Symbols
- Flower: Cosmos
- Tree: Sakura

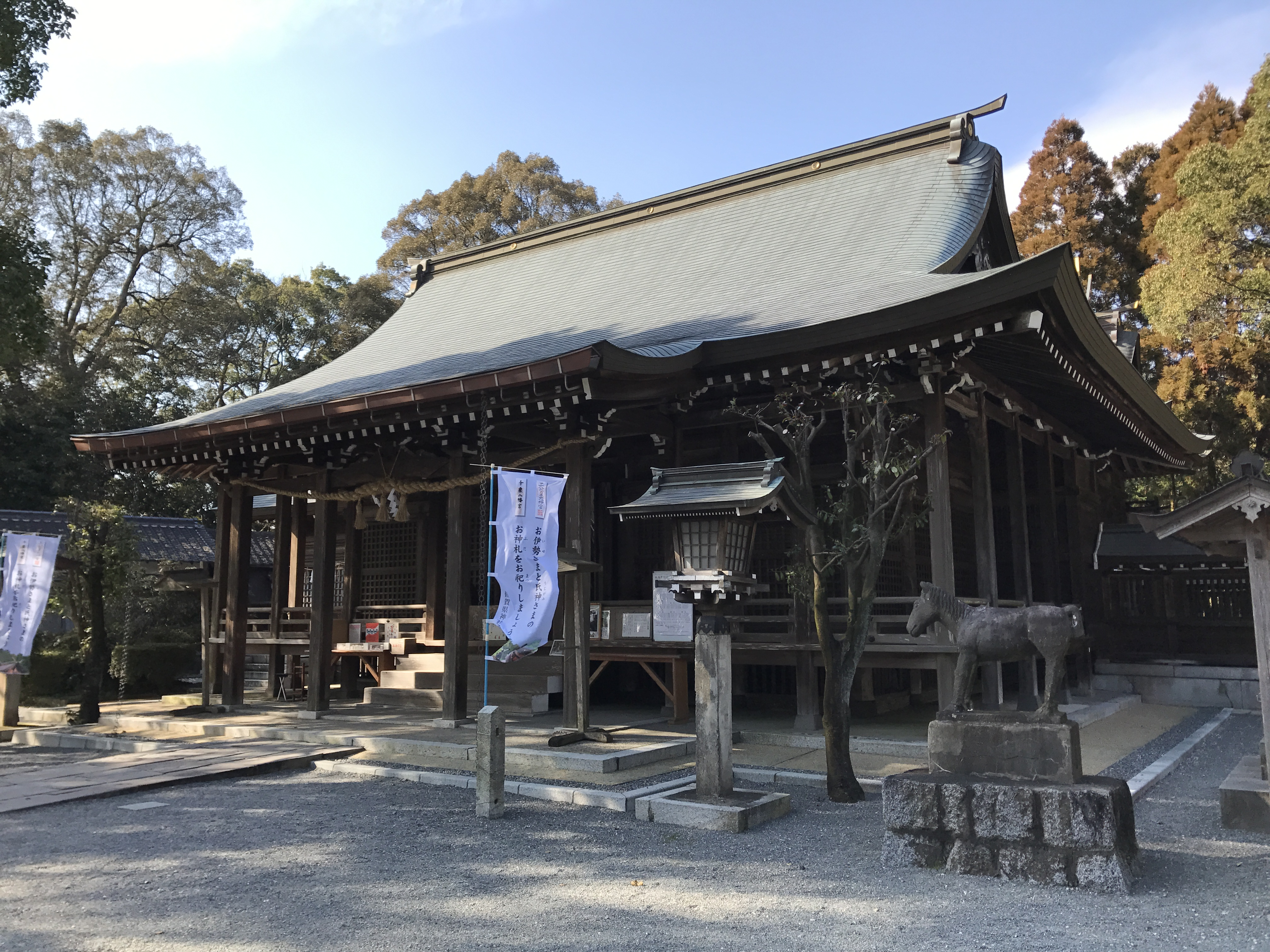
Chiriku Hachiman Shrine

Miyaki (みやき町, Miyaki-chō) is a town in Miyaki District, Saga Prefecture, Japan. As of 30 April 2024, the town had an estimated population of 25,745 in 10599 households, and a population density of 500 people per km^{2}. The total area of the town is 51.92 km^{2} (20.05 sq mi). It is the first town in Saga to have its name spelled in hiragana rather than kanji. It is named after the district it is located in.

== Geography ==
Miyaki is located in the eastern part of Saga Prefecture, about 20 kilometres (12 mi) east of Saga City and about 30 kilometres (19 mi) south of Fukuoka. The northern part of Miyaki contains the Chikushi Mountains, and the southern part contains the Chikugo River. It borders Fukuoka Prefecture on the north and south.

=== Adjoining municipalities ===
Fukuoka Prefecture

- Kurume
- Nakagawa

Saga Prefecture

- Kamimine
- Kanzaki
- Tosu
- Yoshinogari

=== Climate ===
Miyaki has a humid subtropical climate (Köppen Cfa) characterized by warm summers and cool winters with light to no snowfall. The average annual temperature in Miyaki is 15.7 °C. The average annual rainfall is 1946 mm with September as the wettest month. The temperatures are highest on average in August, at around 26.5 °C, and lowest in January, at around 5.1 °C.

=== Demographics ===
Per Japanese census data, the population of Miyaki is as shown below.

Historical population
Year	Pop.	±%
1940	19,804	—
1950	26,807	+35.4%
1960	25,384	−5.3%
1970	24,754	−2.5%
1980	27,757	+12.1%
1990	28,702	+3.4%
2000	28,625	−0.3%
2010	26,175	−8.6%
2020	25,511	−2.5%

== History ==
The area of Miyaki was part of ancient Hizen Province. During the Edo Period, it was mostly part of the holdings of Saga Domain. Following the Meiji restoration, the villages of Nakabaru, Kitashigeyasu, Minamishigeyasu, and Mikawa were established with the creation of the modern municipalities system on April 1, 1889. On April 1, 1955, the villages Minamishigeyasu and Nakabaru merged to form Mine Village, which was raised to town status on May 5, 1962. Kitashigeyasu Village was raised to town status on April 1, 1965, followed by Nakabaru on April 1, 1971. On March 1, 2005, the towns of Mine, Kitashigeyasu and Nakabaru merged to form the town of Miyaki.

== Government ==
Miyaki has a mayor-council form of government with a directly elected mayor and a unicameral town council of 16 members. Miyaki, collectively with the other municipalities of Miyaki District, contributes two members to the Saga Prefectural Assembly. In terms of national politics, the city is part of the Saga 1st district of the lower house of the Diet of Japan.

== Economy ==
The economy of Miyaki is overwhelmingly based on agriculture, mostly rice production.

== Education ==
Miyaki has four public elementary schools and three public junior high schools by the town government, and one public high school operated by the Fukuoka Prefectural Board of Education. The prefecture also operates a special education school for the handicapped.

== Transportation ==
=== Railways ===
JR Kyushu - Nagasaki Main Line

JH Nakabaru

=== Highways ===
- National Route 34
- National Route 264

== Local attractions ==
- Ayabe Shrine
- Chiriku Hachiman Shrine, ichinomiya of former Hizen Province
- Shirasaka Park
