= Hizen-Fumoto Station =

Railway station in Tosu, Saga Prefecture, Japan

JH 03 Hizen-Fumoto Station 肥前麓駅
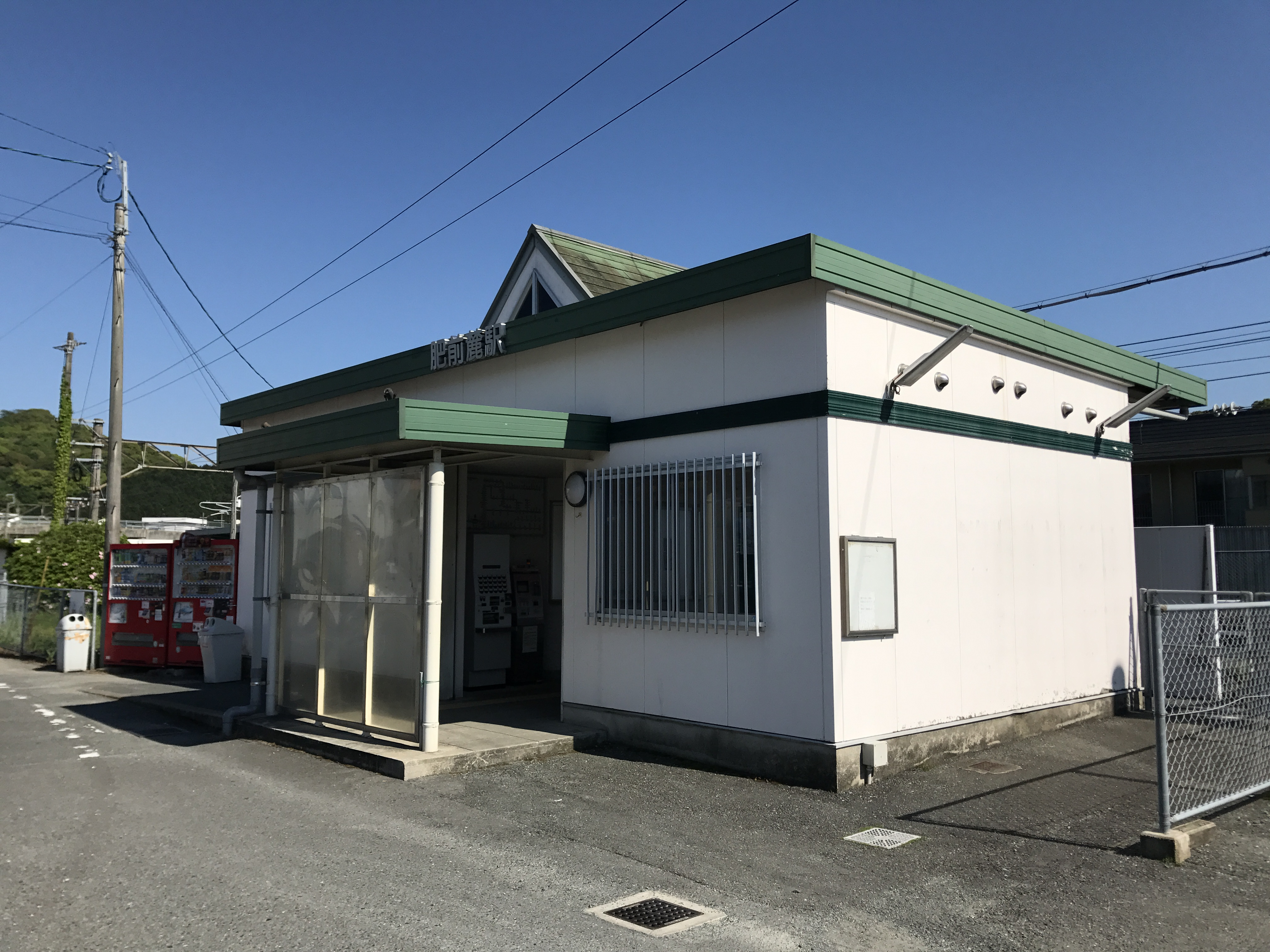
- Hizen-Fumoto Station in 2017

General information
- Location: Hiratamachi, Tosu-shi, Saga-ken 841-0076; Japan
- Coordinates: 33°21′56″N 130°28′39″E
- Operator: JR Kyushu
- Line: JH Nagasaki Main Line
- Distance: 4.2 km from Tosu
- Platforms: 2 side platforms
- Tracks: 2

Construction
- Structure type: At grade
- Accessible: No - platforms linked by footbridge

Other information
- Status: Unstaffed
- Website: Official website

History
- Opened: 30 September 1942

Passengers
- FY2022: 460 daily
- Rank: 227th (among JR Kyushu stations)

Services
Preceding station	JR Kyushu	Following station
Nakabaru towards Nagasaki	Nagasaki Line	Shin-Tosu towards Tosu
Location
- Location within Saga Prefecture Location within Japan

Hizen-Fumoto Station (肥前麓駅, Hizenfumoto-eki) is a passenger railway station located in the city of Tosu, Saga Prefecture, Japan. It is operated by JR Kyushu.

== Lines ==
The station is served by the Nagasaki Main Line and is located 4.2 km from the starting point of the line at Tosu.

== Station layout ==
The station consists of two side platforms serving two tracks. A small station building of concrete construction serves as a waiting room and houses automatic ticket vending machines. The ticket window became unstaffed in 2015. Access to the opposite side platform is by means of a footbridge.

=== Platforms ===
1	■ JH Nagasaki Main Line	for Tosu
2	■ JH Nagasaki Main Line	for Saga and Nagasaki

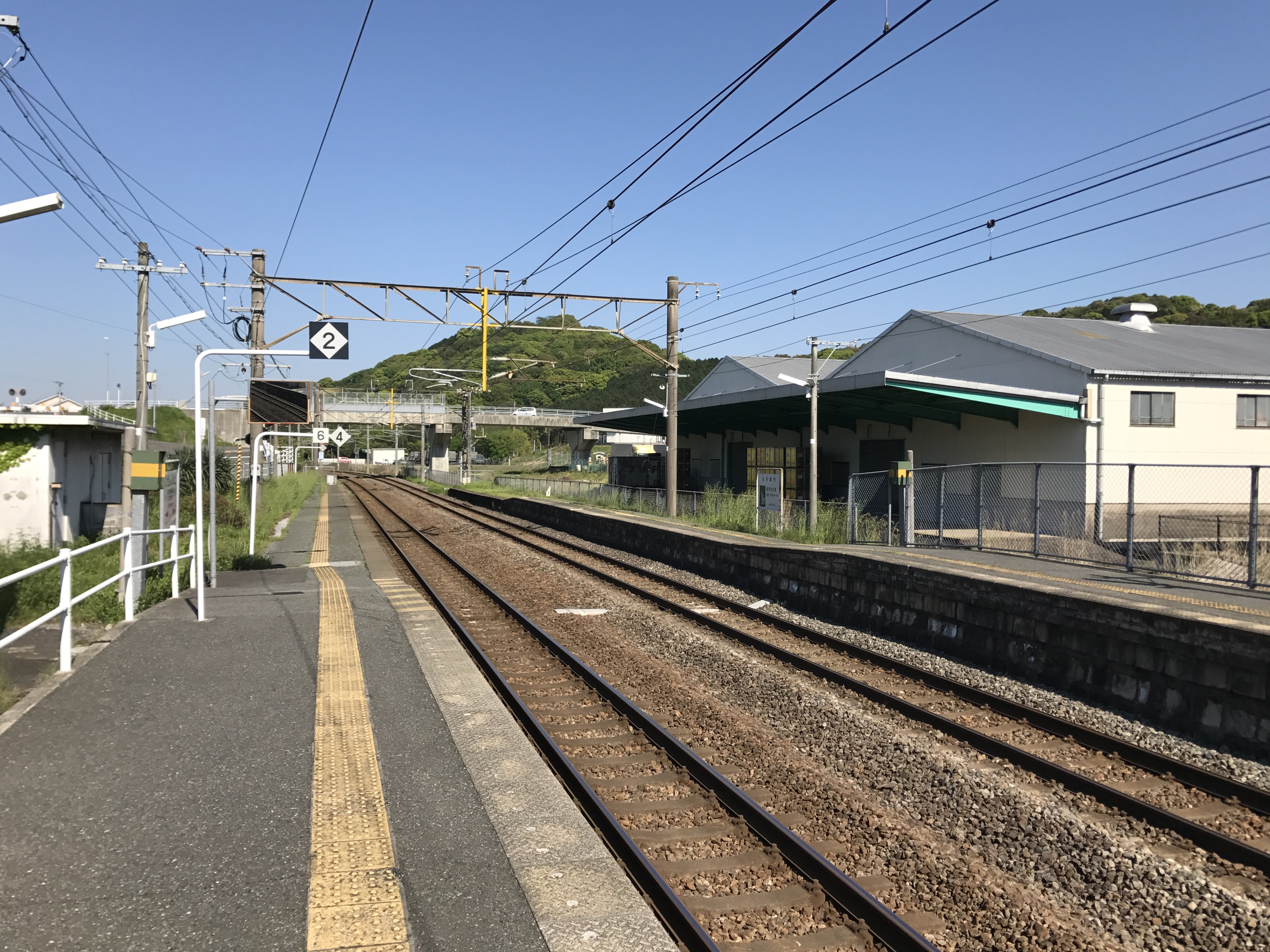
View of the platforms and tracks.

== History ==
Japanese Government Railways (JGR) opened the station as Hizen-Fumoto signal box (肥前麓信号場, Hizen-Fumoto-shingōba) on 30 September 1942 on the existing track of the Nagasaki Main Line. On 1 March 1947, the facility was upgraded to a full station and passenger traffic commenced. With the privatization of Japanese National Railways (JNR), the successor of JGR, on 1 April 1987, control of the station passed to JR Kyushu.

In January 2015, JR Kyushu announced that Hizen-Fumoto would become an unstaffed station from 14 March 2015. This was part of a major effort by the company to reduce its operating deficit by ceasing to staff 32 stations in its network.

== Passenger statistics ==
In fiscal 2020, the station was used by an average of 460 passengers daily (boarding passengers only), and it ranked 227th among the busiest stations of JR Kyushu.

== Surrounding area ==
There are many homes and factories in the area.

- Saga Prefectural Tosu Commercial High School
- Kyūshū Ryūkoku Junior College

== See also ==
- List of railway stations in Japan
