= Chiriku Hachimangu =

Shinto shrine in Saga Prefecture, Japan

Chiriku Hachiman-gū 千栗八幡宮
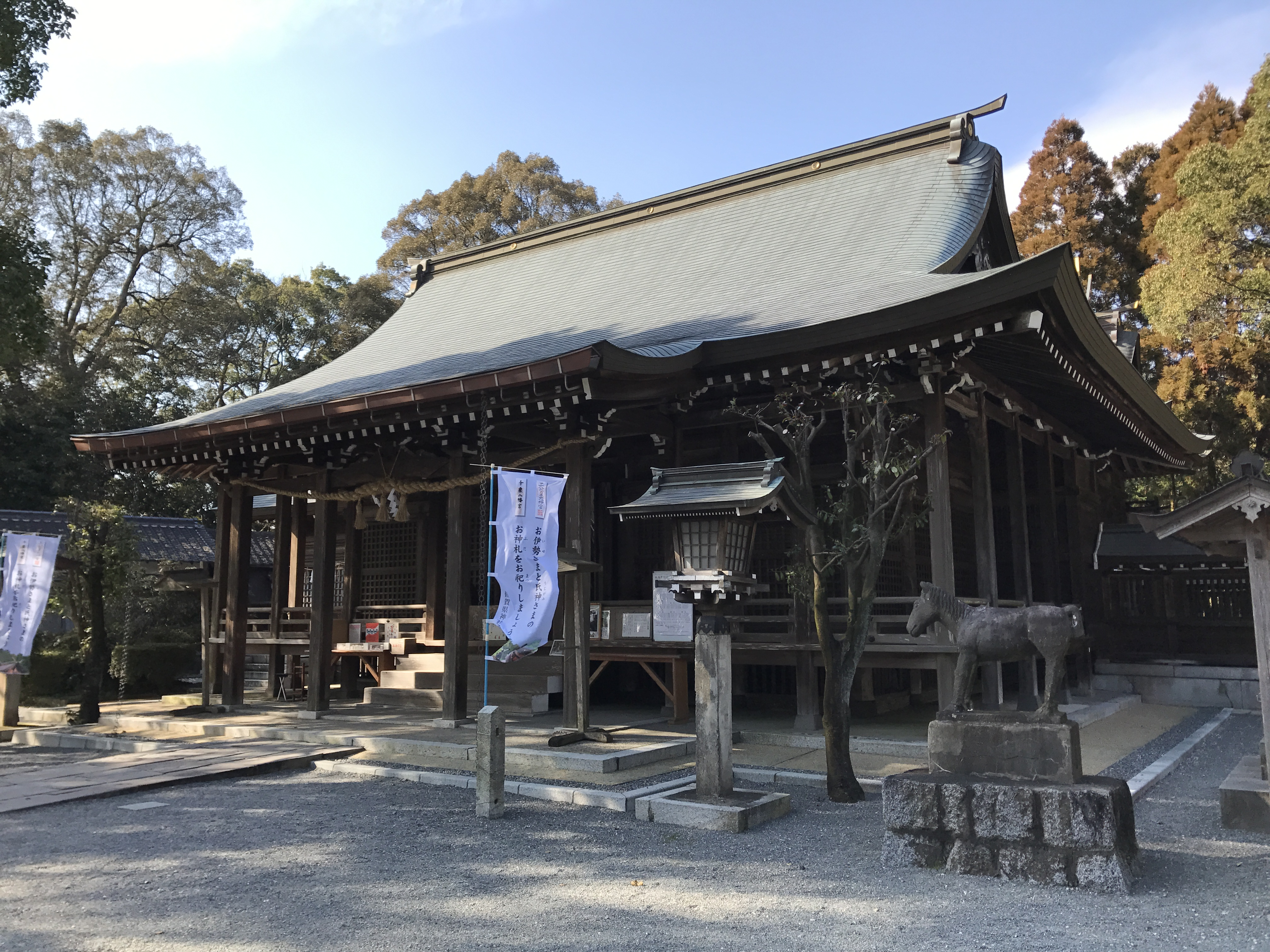
- Haiden of Chiriku Hachiman-gū

- =Chiriku Hachiman-gū Chiriku Hachimangu (Japan)

Religion
- Affiliation: Shinto
- Deity: Hachiman
- Festival: March 15

Location
- Location: Senguri, Shirakabe, Miyaki-cho, Miyaki-gun, Saga-ken
- Interactive map of Chiriku Hachiman-gū 千栗八幡宮
- Coordinates: 33°19′53.1″N 130°28′43.4″E

Architecture
- Founder: Mibu Harunari
- Established: 724

Chiriku Hachiman Shrine (千栗八幡宮, Chiriku Hachiman-gū) is a Shinto shrine in the Shirakabe neighborhood of the town of Miyaki in Saga Prefecture, Japan. It is one of the shrines claiming to be the ichinomiya of former Hizen Province. The main festival of the shrine is held annually on March 15.

== Enshrined kami ==
The kami enshrined at Chiriku Hachiman-gū is Hachiman (八幡神), which in this location is an amalgamation of:

- Emperor Ōjin (応神天皇)
- Emperor Chūai (仲哀天皇)
- Empress Jingū (神功皇后)

Secondary kami include:

- Naniwa-no-miko (難波皇子), son of Emperor Bidatsu
- Uji no Wakiiratsuko (菟道稚郎子), son of Emperor Ōjin
- Sumiyoshi sanjin (住吉明神)
- Takenouchi no Sukune (武内宿禰)

== History ==
According to the Chinzei Yoryaku (鎮西要略), in 724, Mibu Harunari, then governor of Hizen Province, received an oracle from the Hachiman deity to build a shrine on the land where a thousand chestnuts were growing. It became a dependency of the Usa Hachiman-gū in the Johei era (931-938). According to records of the Dazaifu, in 999 oil gushed out of the ground at the shrine and was presented to the Imperial Court. It has been recognized as the ichinomiya of Hizen Province since the Heian period, however, the title is disputed by the Yodohime Shrine, located in the city of Saga. The Chiriku Hachiman-gū burned down in December 1228. It is an indication of the importance of the shrine that the Court dispatched Konoe Kanetsune and Tsuchimikado Sadamichi, two high-ranking nobles in 1230 to investigate and discuss the reconstruction. During the Sengoku period, the shrine was the site of numerous battles and was destroyed several times, most notable in 1534 when it was razed by the Ōuchi clan; it was not rebuilt until 1583 under the sponsorship of the Ryūzōji clan. It continued to be supported by the Nabeshima clan, the daimyō of Saga Domain during the Edo Period. In 1609, it was awarded a plaque by Emperor Go-Yōzei recognizing its position as ichinomiya of Hizen Province.

During the Meiji period era of State Shinto, the shrine was designated as a National shrine, 3rd rank (国幣中社, kokuhei-shōsha) under the Modern system of ranked Shinto Shrines

=== Okayu Matsuri- ===
The main festival of the shrine held on March 15 is affectionately called Okayu-san (粥祭) by the locals, and involves a type of fortune-telling that uses rice porridge to predict whether the harvest will be good or bad that year. On February 16, porridge is boiled with water from the Hara River in front of the shrine, divided into four pots representing the four provinces of Chikuzen, Chikugo, Hizen, and HIgo and placed in the shrine. It is taken out on March 15, and the direction where mold is growing is the region that will have a good harvest that year.

== Gallery ==
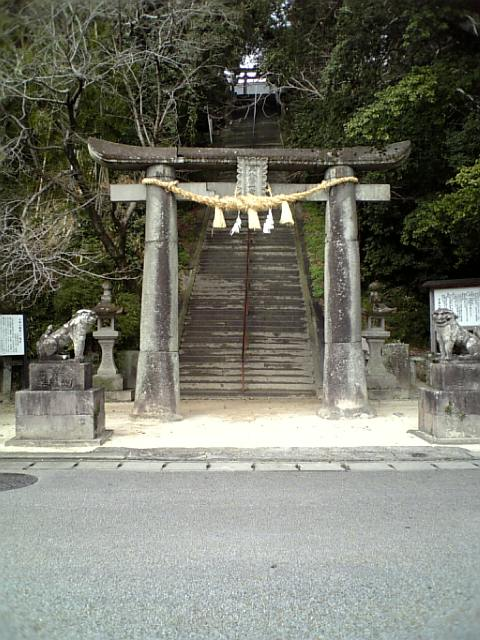
Ichi-no-Torii, (Miyaki Town Tangible Cultural Property)

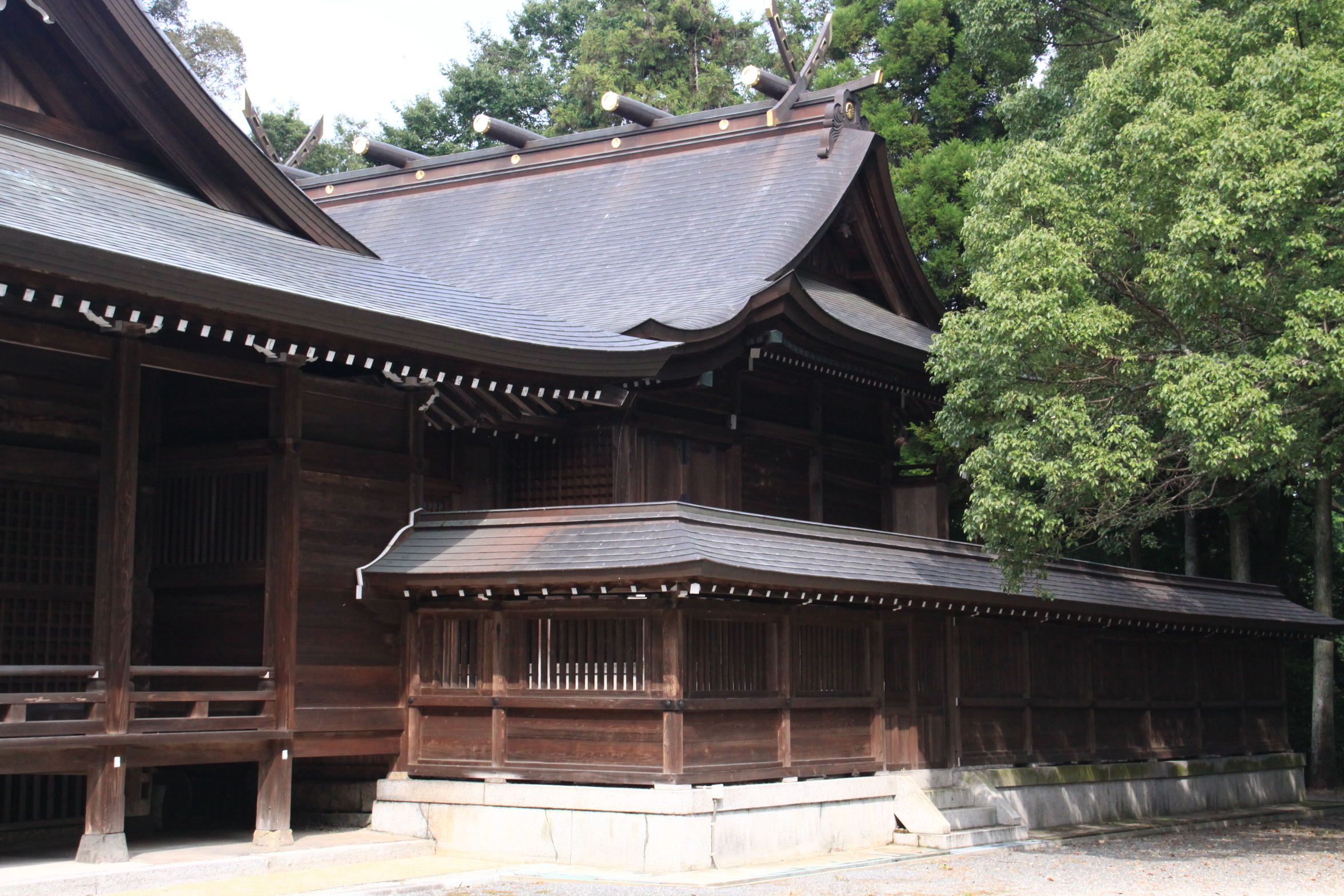
Honden

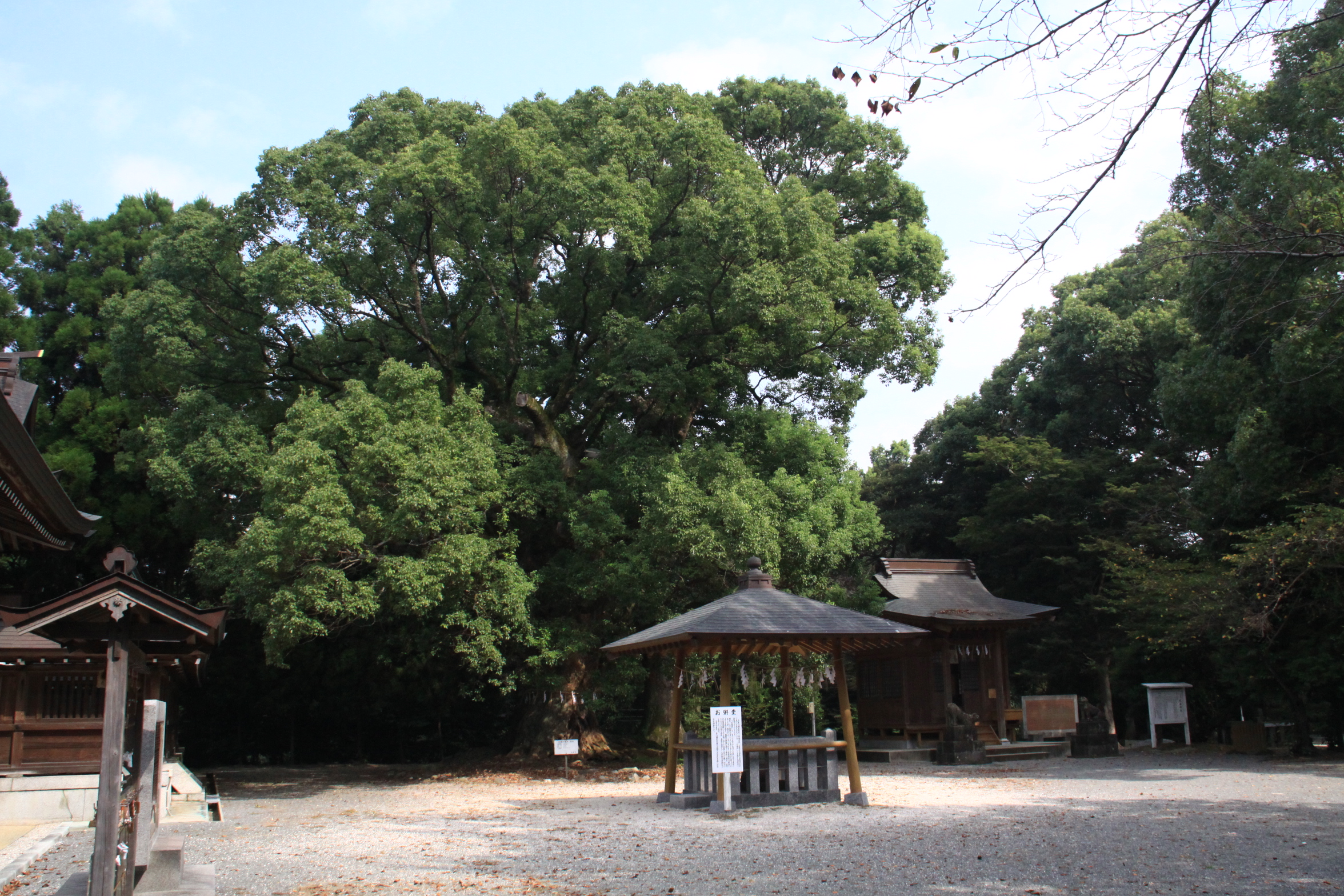
Precincts

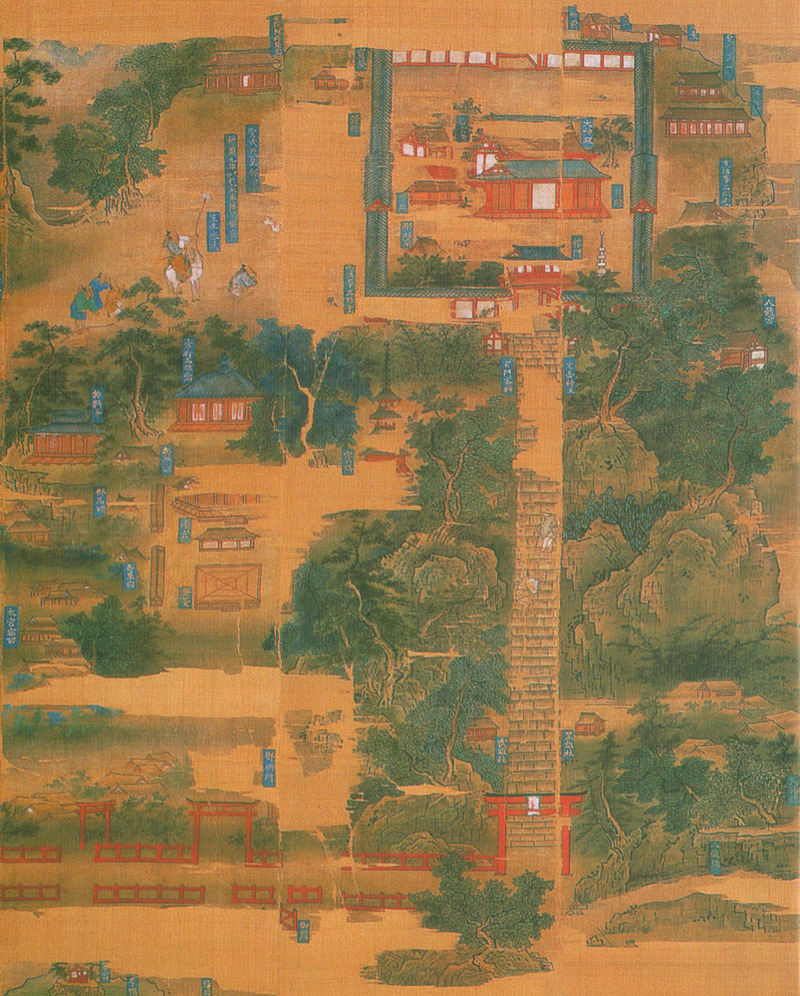
Muromachi period map

== See also ==
- List of Shinto shrines
- Ichinomiya
