= Nakahara, Uttar Pradesh =

Nakahara Nakahra / Nakhara
- Village
- Location in Uttar Pradesh, India Nakahara (India)
- Coordinates: 27.17°N 81.88°E
- Country: India
- State: Uttar Pradesh
- District: Gonda
- Tehsil: Tarabganj

Government
  - Type: Gram Panchayat

Area
  - Total: 2.56 km^{2} (0.99 sq mi)
- Elevation: 109 m (358 ft)

Population (2011)
  - Total: 2,094
  - Density: 818/km^{2} (2,120/sq mi)

Languages
  - Official: Hindi
- Time zone: UTC+5:30 (IST)
- PIN: 271401
- ISO 3166 code: IN-UP
- Vehicle registration: UP-43

Nakahara (also spelled Nakahra or Nakhara) is a village in the state of Uttar Pradesh, India.

== See also ==
- Tarabganj
- Gonda
