= Kitashigeyasu, Saga =

Dissolved municipality in Saga prefecture, Japan

Kitashigeyasu (北茂安町, Kitashigeyasu-chō) was a town located in Miyaki District, Saga Prefecture, Japan. It was established as a village and was later upgraded to a town on April 1, 1965.

As of 2003, the town had an estimated population of 11,419 and a Population density of 687.06 persons per km^{2}. The total area was 16.62 km^{2}.

On March 1, 2005, Kitashigeyasu, along with the towns of Mine and Nakabaru (both located in Miyaki District), was merged to form the town of Miyaki.
