= 中原区 =

中原区 may refer to:

- Nakahara-ku, Kawasaki
- Zhongyuan District
