= Yoshinogari, Saga =

Yoshinogari 吉野ヶ里町
- Town
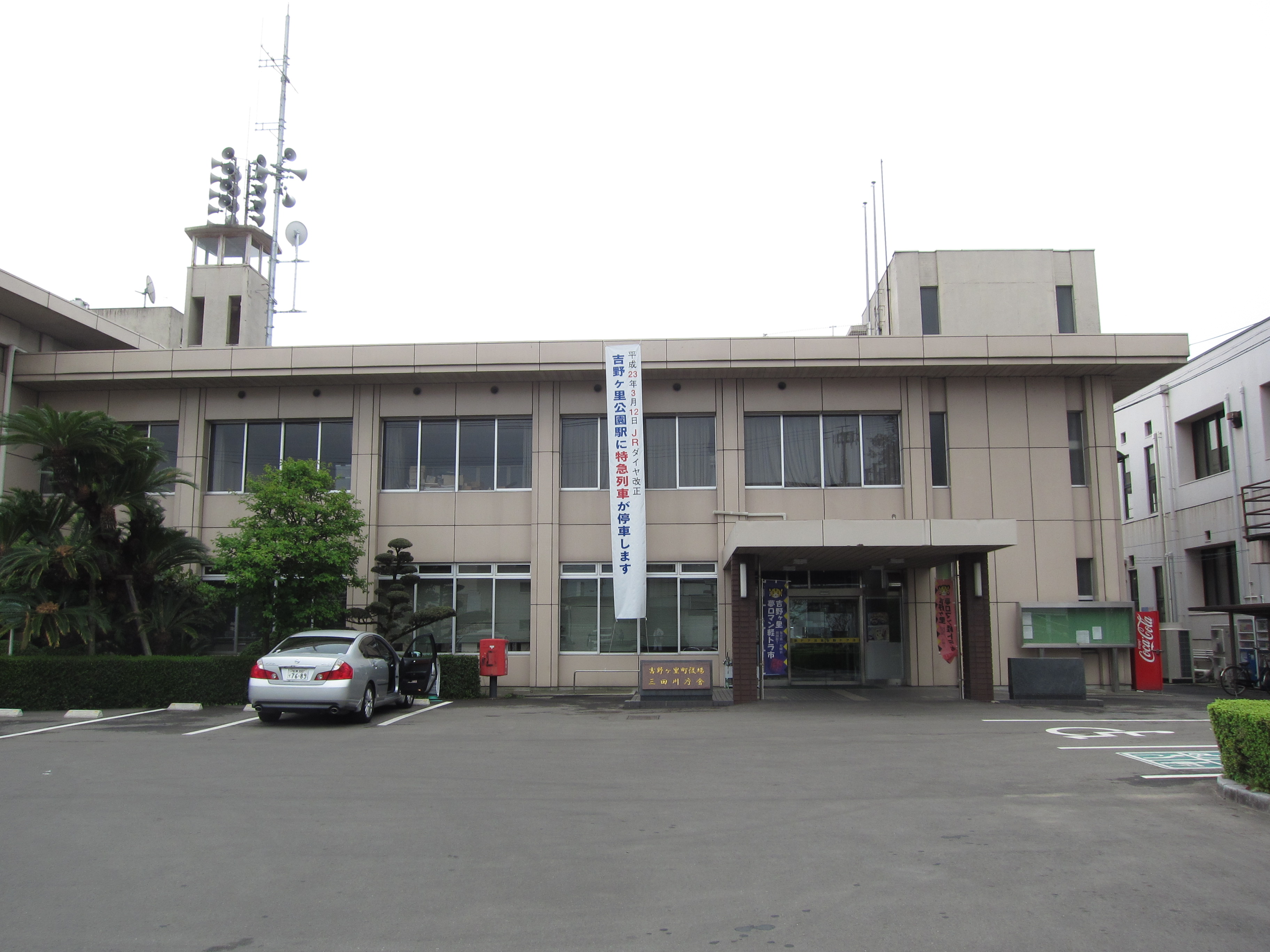
- Yoshinogari Town Hall

- Flag Seal
- Location of Yoshinogari in Saga Prefecture

- Location in Japan
- Coordinates: 33°19′16″N 130°23′56″E
- Country: Japan
- Region: Kyushu
- Prefecture: Saga
- District: Kanzaki

Area
  - Total: 43.99 km^{2} (16.98 sq mi)

Population (April 30, 2024)
  - Total: 16,161
  - Density: 367.4/km^{2} (951.5/sq mi)
- Time zone: UTC+09:00 (JST)
- City hall address: 321-2 Yoshida, Yoshinogari-chō, Kanzaki-gun, Saga-ken 842-8501
- Website: Official website
- Symbols
- Flower: Sakura
- Tree: Camellia sasanqua

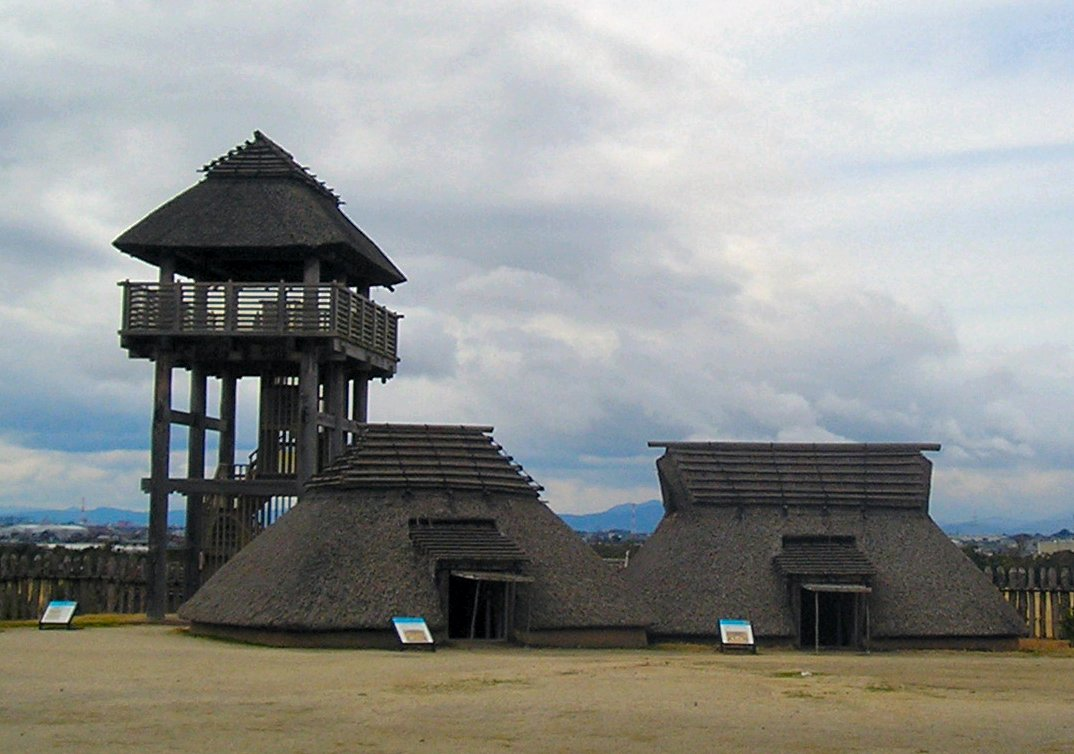
Yoshinogari ruins, after which the town is named

Yoshinogari (吉野ヶ里町, Yoshinogari-chō) is a town located in Kanzaki District, Saga Prefecture, Japan. As of 30 April 2024, the town had an estimated population of 16,161 in 6,792 households, and a population density of 370 people per km^{2}. The total area of the town is 43.99 km^{2} (16.98 sq mi).

== Geography ==
Yoshinogari is located in the northern part of Saga Prefecture. It is about 10 kilometres (6.2 mi) north of Saga City and about 30 kilometres (19 mi) south of Fukuoka. Yoshinogari is very narrow north to south. The southern part contains the northern end of the Chikushi Plains (part of the Saga Plains), and north of the Nagasaki Expressway is the southern end of the Sefuri Mountains.

=== Adjoining municipalities ===
Fukuoka Prefecture

- Fukuoka City, Sawara Ward
- Nakagawa

Saga Prefecture

- Kamimine
- Kanzaki
- Miyaki

=== Climate ===
Yoshinogari has a humid subtropical climate (Köppen Cfa) characterized by warm summers and cool winters with light to no snowfall. The average annual temperature in Yoshinogari is 15.6 °C. The average annual rainfall is 1946 mm with September as the wettest month. The temperatures are highest on average in August, at around 26.0 °C, and lowest in January, at around 5.0 °C.

=== Demographics ===
Per Japanese census data, the population of Yoshinogari is as shown below.

Historical population
Year	Pop.	±%
1940	7,728	—
1950	11,365	+47.1%
1960	13,006	+14.4%
1970	13,864	+6.6%
1980	14,506	+4.6%
1990	15,678	+8.1%
2000	16,042	+2.3%
2010	16,381	+2.1%
2020	16,323	−0.4%

== History ==
The area of Yoshinogari was part of ancient Hizen Province. During the Edo Period, it was part of the holdings of Saga Domain. Following the Meiji restoration, the villages of Mitagawa and Higashi-Sefuri were established with the creation of the modern municipalities system on April 1, 1889. On April 1, 1965, Mitagawa was raised to town status. Mitagawa and Higashi-Sefuri merged to form the town of Yoshinogari on March 1, 2006. The town took its name from the remains of a Yayoi period moat-encircled village that was discovered on Yoshinogari Hill in 1986 at the site of a planned factory housing complex.

== Government ==
Yoshinogari has a mayor-council form of government with a directly elected mayor and a unicameral town council of 12 members. Yoshinogari, collectively with the other municipalities of Miyaki District, contributes two members to the Saga Prefectural Assembly. In terms of national politics, the town is part of the Saga 2nd district of the lower house of the Diet of Japan.

The Japan Ground Self-Defense Force Metabaru Air Field is located in Yoshinogari.

== Economy ==
The economy of Yoshinogari is based on agriculture, mostly rice production, and light manufacturing.

== Education ==
Yoshinogari has two public elementary schools and two public junior high schools by the town government. The town does not have a high school.

== Transportation ==
=== Railways ===
JR Kyushu - Nagasaki Main Line

JH Yoshinogari-kōen

=== Highways ===
- Nagasaki Expressway (Higashi-Sefuri Interchange)
- National Route 34
- National Route 385

== Local attractions ==
- Yoshinogari site, Special National Historic Site
