= Yoshinogari-Kōen Station =

Railway station in Yoshinogari, Saga Prefecture, Japan

JH 05 Yoshinogari-Kōen Station 吉野ヶ里公園駅
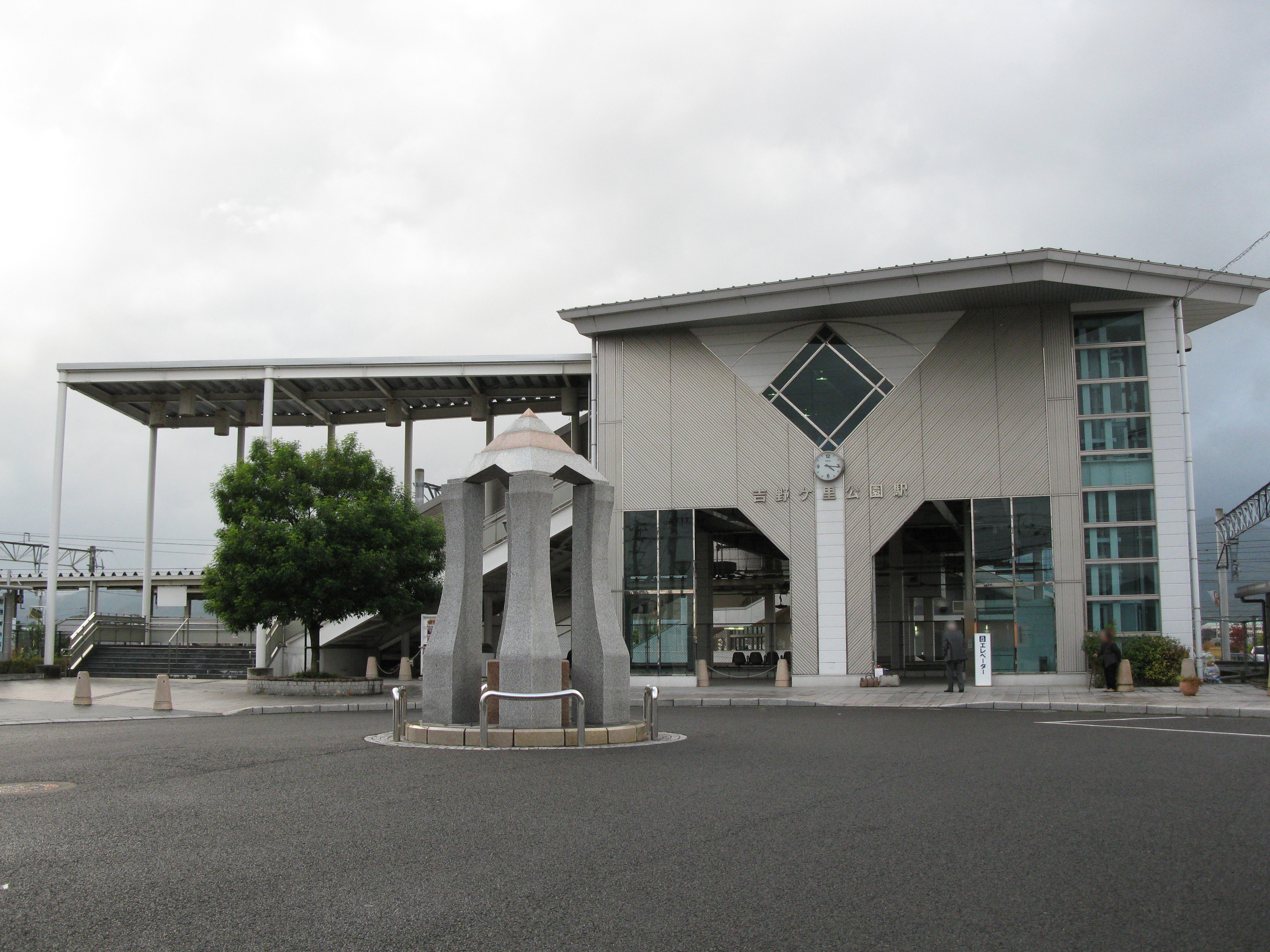
- The south entrance of Yoshinogari-Kōen Station in 2009

General information
- Location: 251-2 Yoshida, Yoshinogari-cho, Kanzaki-gun, Saga-ken 842-0031; Japan
- Coordinates: 33°19′29″N 130°23′59″E
- Operator: JR Kyushu
- Line: JH Nagasaki Main Line
- Distance: 13.1 km from Tosu
- Platforms: 1 side + 1 island platforms
- Tracks: 3 + 2 sidings

Construction
- Structure type: At grade
- Parking: Available
- Cycle facilities: Designated parking area for bikes
- Accessible: Yes - platforms served by elevators

Other information
- Status: Staffed ticket window (outsourced)
- Website: Official website

History
- Opened: 30 September 1942
- Former names: Mitagawa (until 10 Oct 1993)

Passengers
- FY2022: 1037 daily
- Rank: 130th (among JR Kyushu stations)

Services
| Preceding station | JR Kyushu | Following station |
|---|---|---|
| Kanzaki towards Nagasaki | Nagasaki Line | Nakabaru towards Tosu |
Location
- Location within Saga Prefecture Location within Japan

Yoshinogari-Kōen Station (吉野ヶ里公園駅, Yoshinogari kōen eki) is a passenger railway station located in the town of Yoshinogari, Kanzaki District, Saga Prefecture, Japan. It is operated by JR Kyushu and is on the Nagasaki Main Line.

== Lines ==
The station is served by the Nagasaki Main Line and is located 13.1 km from the starting point of the line at Tosu.

== Station layout ==
The station consists of a side platform and an island platform serving three tracks with two sidings branching off track 1. The station building is a modern design of concrete and is an elevated structure where the passenger facilities such as a waiting area, ticket window and automatic ticket vending machines are located on a bridge which spans the tracks. The bridge also allows the station to have two entrances, one from each side of the tracks. Elevators provide access to the bridge from both entrances and, from the bridge, to the platforms.

Management of the station has been outsourced to the JR Kyushu Tetsudou Eigyou Co., a wholly owned subsidiary of JR Kyushu specialising in station services. It staffs the ticket window which is equipped with a POS machine but does not have a Midori no Madoguchi facility.

=== Platforms ===
| 1 | ■ JH Nagasaki Main Line | for Tosu |
| | ■ JH Nagasaki Main Line | <not in normal operation> |
| 3 | ■ JH Nagasaki Main Line | for Saga and Nagasaki |

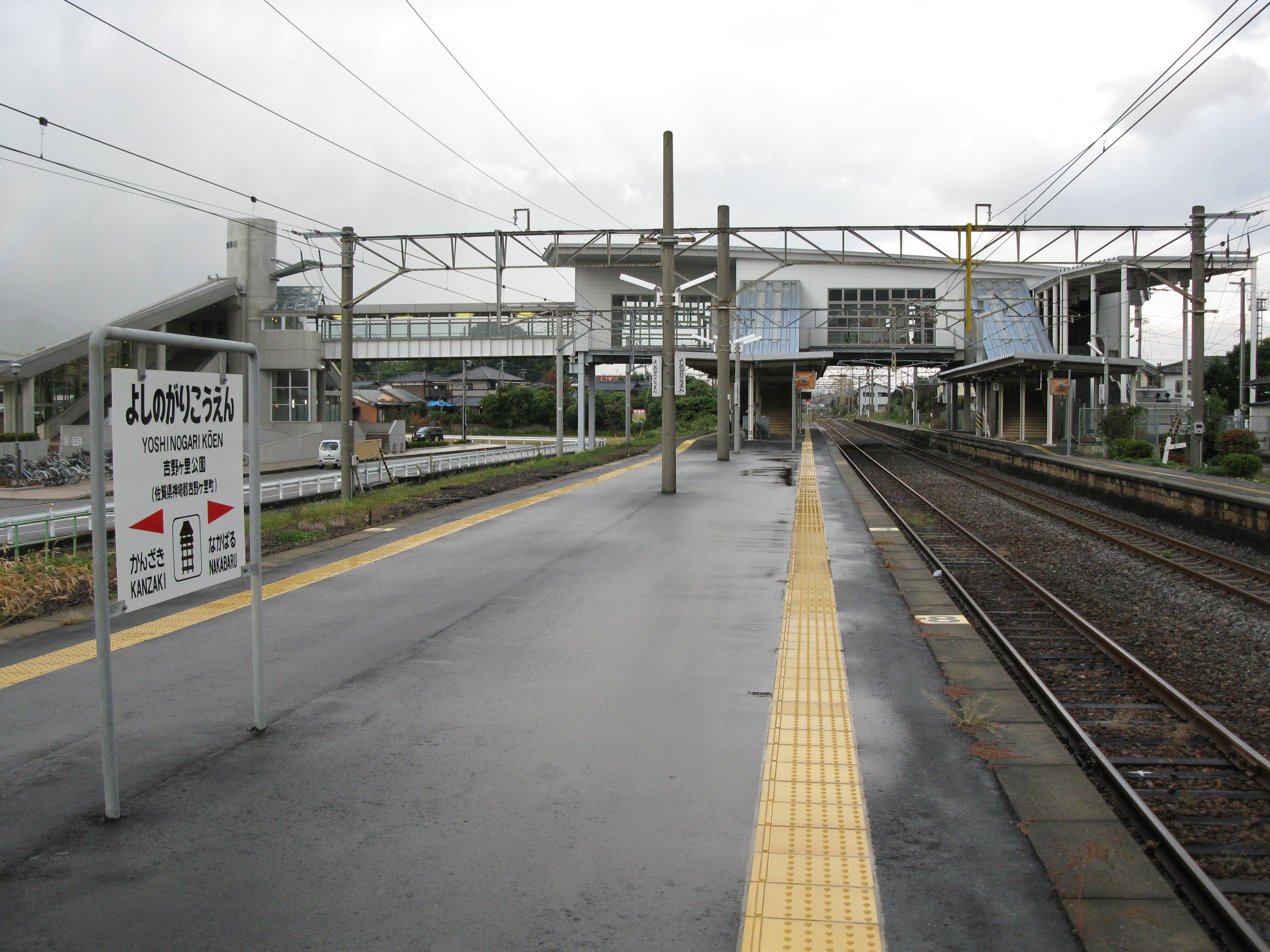
A view of the platforms and tracks showing how the station building spans the tracks.

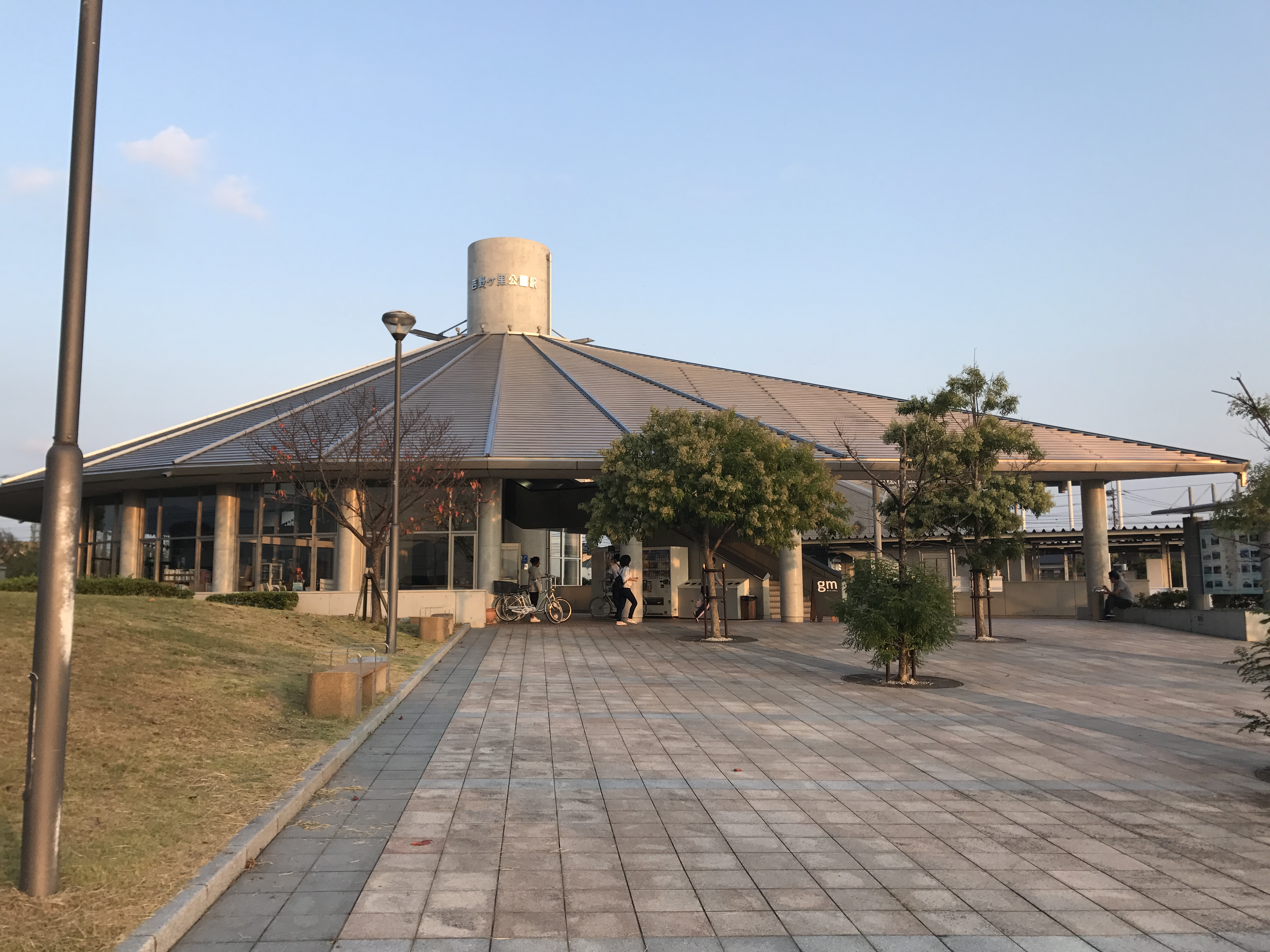
The north entrance of the station.

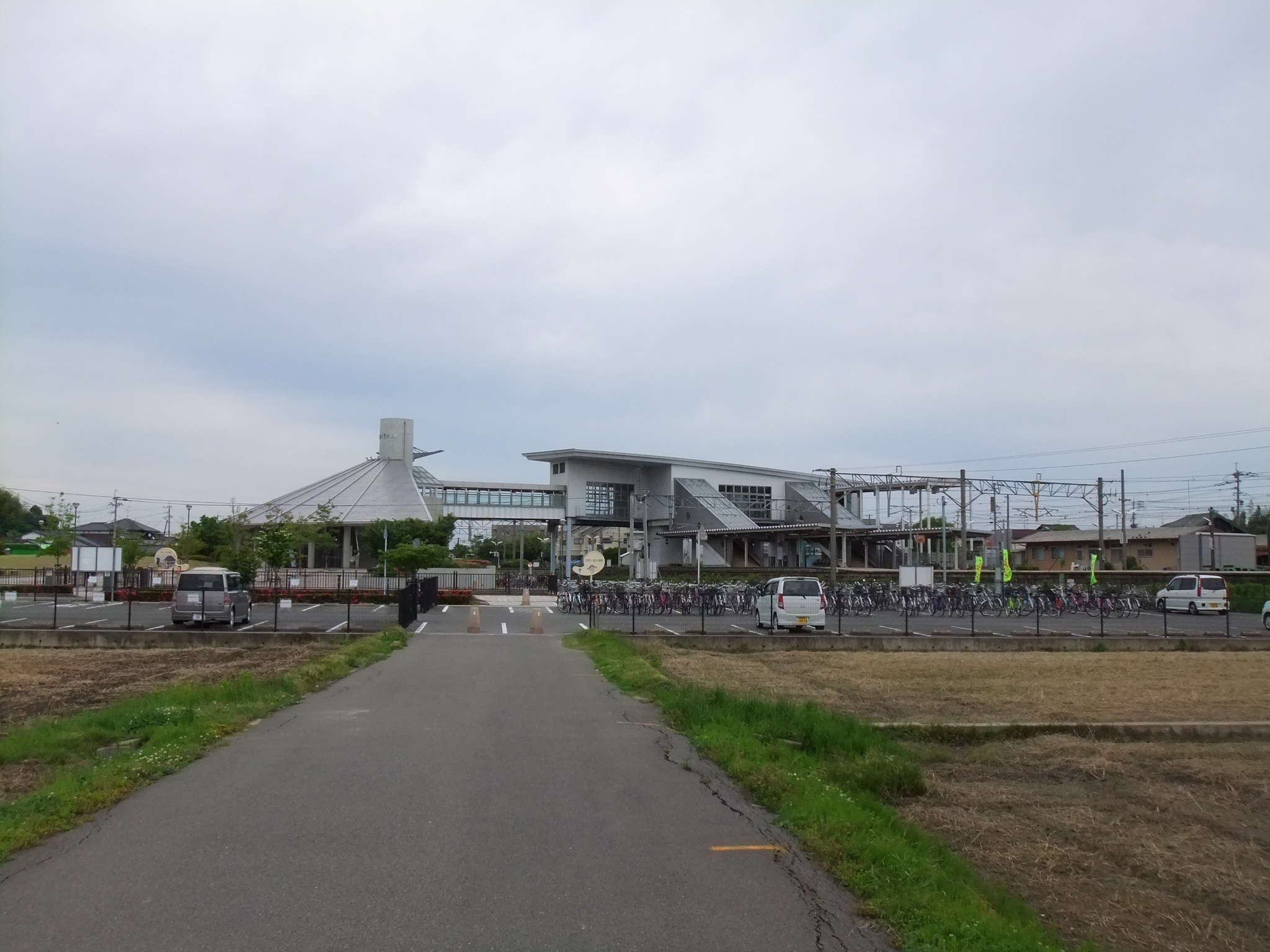
A distant view of the station, north entrance to the left, showing parking facilities.

== History ==
Japanese Government Railways (JGR) opened the station as Mitagawa signal box (三田川信号場, Mitagawa-shingōba) on 30 September 1942 on the existing track of the Nagasaki Main Line. On 1 December 1943, the facility was upgraded to a full station and passenger traffic commenced. With the privatization of Japanese National Railways (JNR), the successor of JGR, on 1 April 1987, control of the station passed to JR Kyushu. On 10 October 1993, the station was renamed Yoshinogari-Kōen. On 1 March 2000, a new hashigami style station building was opened.

== Passenger statistics ==
In fiscal 2020, the station was used by an average of 1037 passengers daily (boarding passengers only), and it ranked130th among the busiest stations of JR Kyushu.

== Surrounding area ==
- Yoshinogari Historical Park
- Japan National Route 34

== See also ==
- List of railway stations in Japan
