= Nakahara (surname) =

Nakahara (written: 中原 or 仲原) is a Japanese surname. Notable people with the surname include:

- An Nakahara (中原 杏, born 1969), Japanese manga artist
- Aya Nakahara (中原 アヤ, born 1973), Japanese manga artist
- Chūya Nakahara (中原 中也, 1907–1937), Japanese poet
- Jun'ichi Nakahara (中原 淳一, 1913–1983), Japanese graphic artist and fashion designer
- Kellye Nakahara (born 1950), American actress
- Mai Nakahara (中原 麻衣, born 1981), Japanese voice actress and singer
- Makoto Nakahara (中原 誠, born 1947), Japanese shogi player
- Masaya Nakahara (中原 昌也, born 1970), Japanese musician, writer and actor
- Meiko Nakahara (中原 めいこ, born 1959), Japanese singer
- Morihiko Nakahara (born 1975), Japanese conductor
- Nakahara Nantenbō (中原 南天棒, 1839–1925), Japanese Zen Buddhist
- Nobuko Nakahara (中原 暢子, 1929–2008), Japanese architect
- Ryutaro Nakahara (中原 龍太郎, born 1979), Japanese composer
- Shigeru Nakahara (中原 茂, born 1961), Japanese voice actor
- Shogo Nakahara (中原 彰吾, born 1994), Japanese footballer
- Shun Nakahara (中原 俊, born 1951), Japanese film director
- Shuto Nakahara (中原 秀人, born 1990), Japanese footballer
- Takayuki Nakahara (中原 貴之, born 1984), Japanese footballer
- Takeo Nakahara (中原 丈雄, born 1951), Japanese actor
- Tsuneo Nakahara (中原 恒雄, 1930–2016), Japanese electrical engineer
- Yusei Nakahara (中原 優生, born 1993), Japanese footballer
- Zenchū Nakahara (仲原 善忠, 1890–1964), Japanese ethnologist

== Fictional Characters ==
- Chūya Nakahara (中原 中也), an antagonist in Bungo Stray Dogs
- Misaki Nakahara (中原岬), one of the main protagonists in Welcome to the N.H.K.
- Mizuki Nakahara (中原 ミズキ), a supporting character in Lycoris Recoil
- Sunako Nakahara (中原 スナコ), the main protagonist in The Wallflower
