= Mine, Saga =

Mine 三根町
- Former town
- Location in Japan
- Coordinates: 33°17′48″N 130°25′52″E
- Country: Japan Kyushu#Japan
- Region: Kyushu
- Prefecture: Saga Prefecture
- District: Miyaki
- Merged: March 1, 2005 (now part of Miyaki)
- Time zone: UTC+09:00 (JST)

Mine (三根町, Mine-chō; Japanese pronunciation: [mi.ne.tʃoː]) was a town located in Miyaki District, Saga Prefecture, Japan. The status of this municipality was changed from a village to a town on May 1, 1962.

As of 2003, the town had an estimated population of 7,361 and a density of 449.66 persons per km^{2}. Its total area was 16.37 km^{2}.

On March 1, 2005, Mine, along with the towns of Kitashigeyasu and Nakabaru (all from Miyaki District), was merged to create the town of Miyaki.

Mine's amenities include a sports center, junior high school, and two convenience stores. There is also a small library located somewhat towards the north. Mine has a small temple to a Buddha that is apparently able to cure warts. Mine is technically in the prefecture of Saga, but the city of Kurume in Fukuoka prefecture is closer than the city of Saga and is used by far more people. The city is just across the river called Mamebashi.
