= Central Plain =

Central Plain or Central Plains may refer to:

== Regions ==
- Zhongyuan, a plain in Northern China in the lower reaches of the Yellow River which was the cradle of Chinese civilisation
  - Central Plains Economic Zone
- Central Plain (Antigua), home to the majority of the country's population
- Central Plain (Wisconsin), one of the geographical regions of Wisconsin
- Central Plains Region, an informal geographic region of the Canadian province of Manitoba
- Central Plains Water, an enhancement scheme for the "Central Plains" of Canterbury, New Zealand
- The South Central Plains taking up most of Piney Woods, a forest terrestrial ecoregion in the Southern United States.
- Central Thailand, a plain in Thailand
- Great Plains, in North America, a portion of which is known as Central Plain
- Central Plains USD 112, a unified school district including various communities in central Kansas, USA

== See also ==
- Central (disambiguation)
- Plain (disambiguation)
