= Nakabaru, Saga =

Dissolved municipality in Saga prefecture, Japan

Nakabaru (中原町, Nakabaru-chō) was a town located in Miyaki District, Saga Prefecture, Japan. The status of Nakabaru was changed from a village to a town on April 1, 1971.

As of 2003, the town had an estimated population of 8,829 and a density of 467.14 persons per km^{2}. The total area was 18.90 km^{2}.

On March 1, 2005, Nakabaru, along with the towns of Kitashigeyasu and Mine (all from Miyaki District), was merged to create the town of Miyaki.
