= Ayabe Shrine =

Shrine of the kami Hachiman, located in Miyaki, Saga, Saga Prefecture, Japan

Ayabe Shrine 綾部神社
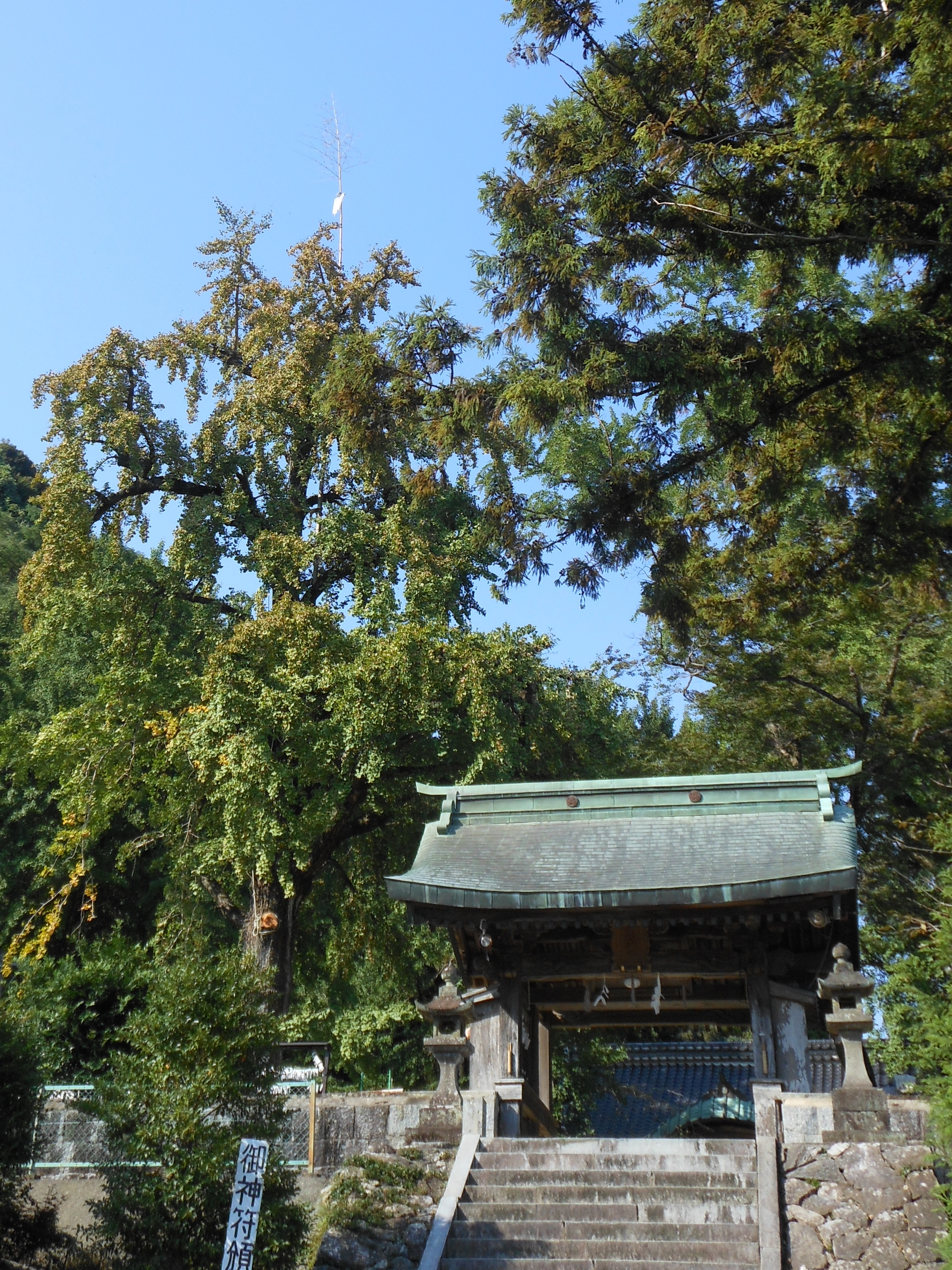

Religion
- Affiliation: Shinto
- Deity: Hachiman
- Type: Hachiman shrine

Location
- Location: Miyaki, Saga, Saga Prefecture, Japan
- Interactive map of Ayabe Shrine 綾部神社
- Coordinates: 33°21′38″N 130°26′28″E

Architecture
- Founder: Ayabe Shirodayu Michitoshi
- Established: 1205

Website
- www.town.miyaki.lg.jp

Ayabe Shrine (綾部神社) is a shrine of the kami Hachiman, located in Miyaki, Saga, Saga Prefecture, Japan.

== Information ==
In July 1189, Ayabe Shirodayu Michitoshi, prayed for victory in the Battle of Ōshū. After the battle had ended, he was given land as a reward. He then donated some of the land to have a shrine built on it. Ayabe Shrine was then built in 1205, at the foot of what was once Ayabe Castle.

The shrine is also known as the oldest meteorological observatory in Japan. On July 15 every year, flags are raised on trees at the shrine. After five days, the location of the flag is used to predict future weather events. A festival is held every year with various Shinto rituals and sumo wrestling to mark the event.
