= Kawatana Station =

Railway station in Kawatana, Nagasaki Prefecture, Japan

Kawatana Station 川棚駅
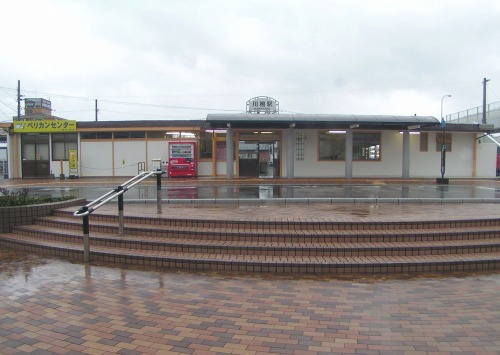
- Kawatana Station in 2007

General information
- Location: Momozugo, Kawatana-cho, Higashisonogi-gun, Nagasaki-ken 859-3605; Japan
- Coordinates: 33°04′07″N 129°51′50″E
- Operator: JR Kyushu
- Line: ■ Ōmura Line
- Distance: 13.6 km from Haiki
- Platforms: 2 side platforms
- Tracks: 2

Construction
- Structure type: At grade
- Parking: Available
- Accessible: Yes - platforms linked by level crossing and ramps

Other information
- Status: Staffed ticket window (outsourced)
- Website: Official website

History
- Opened: 20 January 1898

Passengers
- FY2020: 746 daily
- Rank: 174th (among JR Kyushu stations)

Services
Preceding station	JR Kyushu	Following station
Sonogi towards Isahaya	Ōmura Line Local	Ogushigō towards Haiki
Sonogi towards Isahaya	Ōmura Line Seaside Liner	Huis Ten Bosch towards Haiki
Location
- Location within Nagasaki Prefecture Location within Japan

Kawatana Station (川棚駅, Kawatana-eki) is a passenger railway station located in the town of Kawatana, Nagasaki Prefecture, Japan. It is operated by JR Kyushu.

== Lines ==
The station is served by the Ōmura Line and is located 13.6 km from the starting point of the line at Haiki. Besides the local services on the line, the Rapid Seaside Liner also stops at the station.

== Station layout ==
The station consists of two side platforms serving two tracks. The platforms and tracks are not opposed. Platform/track 2 is actually on the far side of what was once an island platform with the centre line removed. A siding runs beside track 2. The station building is a steel frame structure of modern design and houses a waiting room and staffed ticket window. A ramp leads up to the station building from the forecourt. Access to the opposite site platform is by means of a level crossing with ramps at both ends. A footbridge allows pedestrians to cross from one side of the tracks to the other. Parking for cars is available both at the station forecourt and on the other side of the tracks.

Management of the station has been outsourced to the JR Kyushu Tetsudou Eigyou Co., a wholly owned subsidiary of JR Kyushu specialising in station services. It staffs the ticket window which is equipped with a POS machine but does not have a Midori no Madoguchi facility.

=== Platforms ===
1	■ Ōmura Line	for Nagasaki
2	■ Ōmura Line	for Sasebo

== History ==
The private Kyushu Railway, in building a line to Nagasaki, had opened a track southwards from Tosu to Saga and Takeo (today Takeo-Onsen) by 1895. By 1897, the track had reached Haiki. In the next phase of expansion, the track was extended towards Ōmura which opened as the new terminus on 20 January 1898. Kawatana was opened on the same day as an intermediate station between Haiki and Ōmura. When the Kyushu Railway was nationalized on 1 July 1907, Japanese Government Railways (JGR) took over control of the station. On 12 October 1909, track from Tosu through Haiki to Nagasaki was designated the Nagasaki Main Line. On 1 December 1934, another route was given the designation Nagasaki Main Line and the track from Haiki, through Kawatana to Isahaya was designated the Ōmura Line. With the privatization of Japanese National Railways (JNR), the successor of JGR, on 1 April 1987, control of the station passed to JR Kyushu.

== Passenger statistics ==
In fiscal 2020, the station was used by an average of 746 passengers daily (boarding passengers only), and it ranked 174th among the busiest stations of JR Kyushu.

== Surrounding area ==
- Japan National Route 205
- Saihi bus Kawatana Bus Station
- Kawatana post office
- Kawatana police office
- Kawatana River
- Kawatana public office
- Nagasaki Kawatana Medical Center

== See also ==
- List of railway stations in Japan
