= Haenosaki Station =

Railway station in Sasebo, Nagasaki Prefecture, Japan

Haenosaki Station 南風崎駅
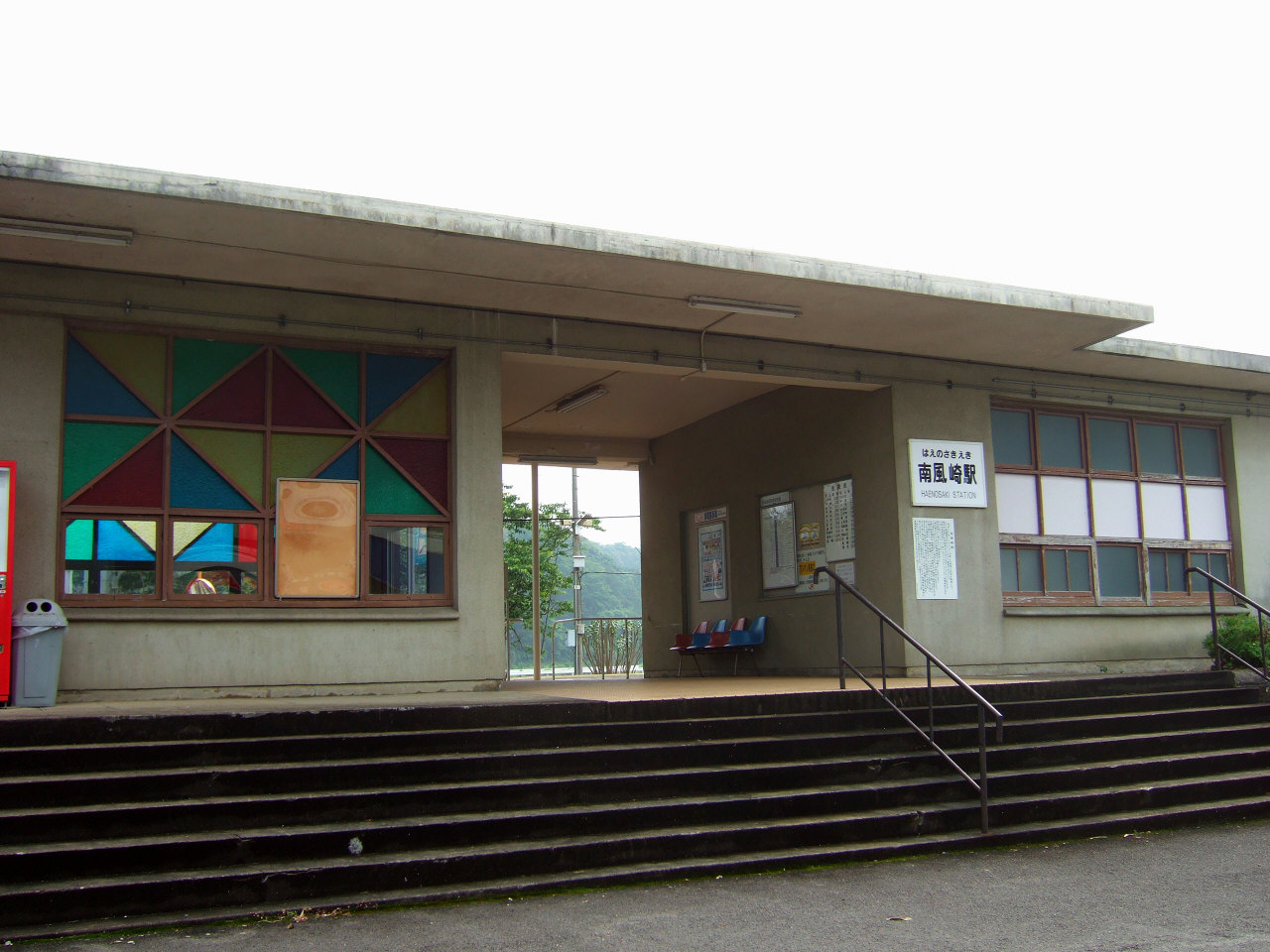
- Haenosaki Station in 2008

General information
- Location: Haenosakicho, Sasebo-shi, Nagasaki-ken 859-3236; Japan
- Coordinates: 33°05′13″N 129°48′03″E
- Operator: JR Kyushu
- Line: ■ Ōmura Line
- Distance: 5.6 km from Haiki
- Platforms: 2 side platforms
- Tracks: 2 + 1 siding

Construction
- Structure type: At grade
- Accessible: No - platforms linked by level crossing with steps

Other information
- Status: Unstaffed
- Website: Official website

History
- Opened: 20 January 1898

Passengers
- FY2014: 18 daily

Services
Preceding station	JR Kyushu	Following station
Ogushigō towards Isahaya	Ōmura Line Local	Huis Ten Bosch towards Haiki
Location
- Location within Nagasaki Prefecture Location within Japan

Haenosaki Station (南風崎駅, Haenosaki-eki) is a passenger railway station located in Haenosaki-cho, Sasebo, Nagasaki Prefecture, Japan. It is operated by JR Kyushu.

== Lines ==
The station is served by the Ōmura Line and is located 5.6 km from the starting point of the line at Haiki. Only local trains stop at the station.

== Station layout ==
The station consists of two side platforms serving two tracks with a siding branching off track 1. The station building, a steel frame structure of modern design, is unstaffed and the waiting room is closed. Access to the opposite side platform is by means of a level crossing with steps at both ends.

=== Platforms ===
1	■ Ōmura Line	for Nagasaki
2	■ Ōmura Line	for Sasebo

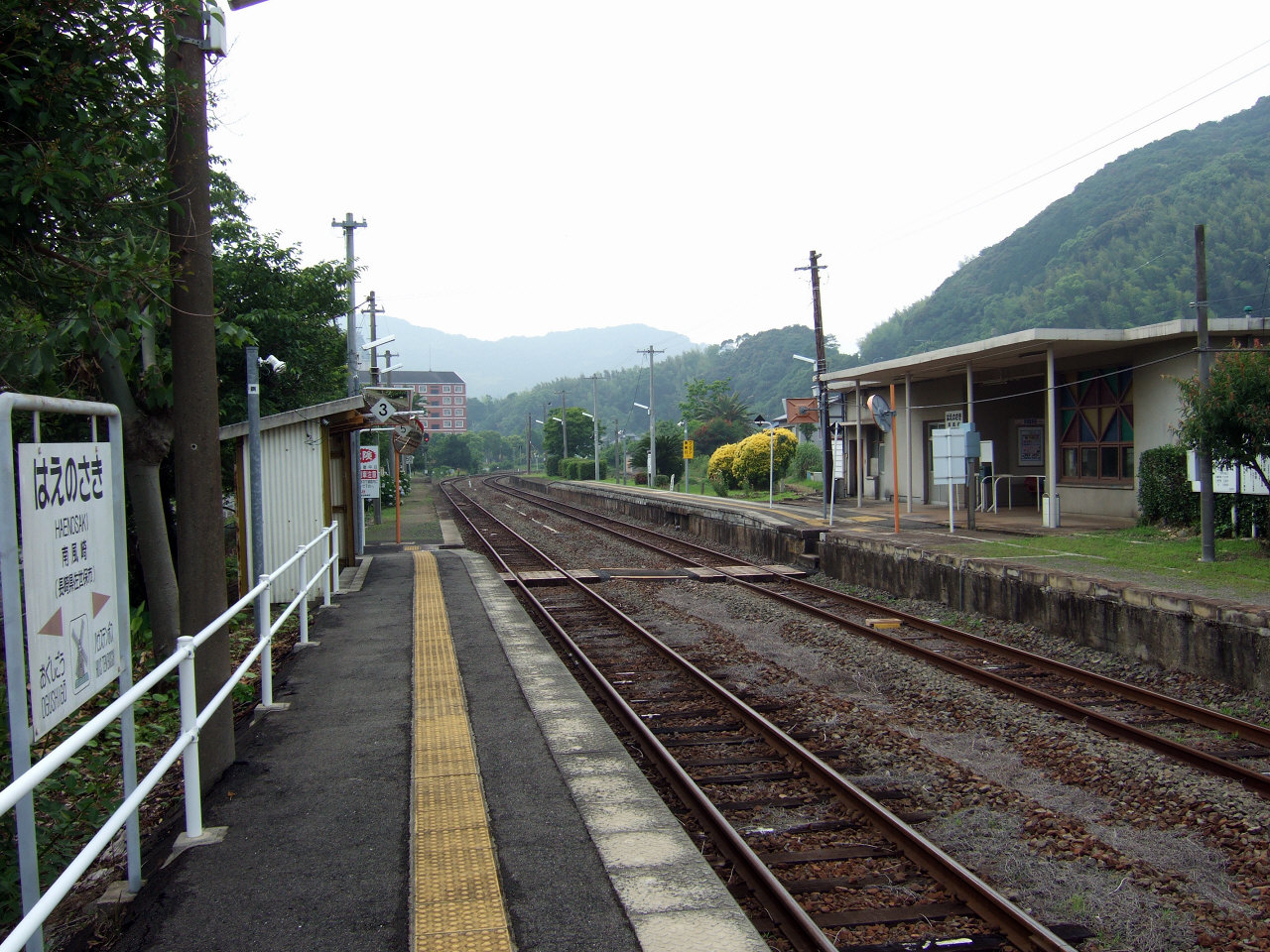
View of the platforms and tracks. Note the level crossing.

== History ==
The private Kyushu Railway, in building a line to Nagasaki, had opened a track southwards from Tosu to Saga and Takeo (today Takeo-Onsen) by 1895. By 1897, the track had reached Haiki. In the next phase of expansion, the track was extended towards Ōmura which opened as the new terminus on 20 January 1898. Haenosaki was opened on the same day as an intermediate station between Haiki and Ōmura. When the Kyushu Railway was nationalized on 1 July 1907, Japanese Government Railways (JGR) took over control of the station. On 12 October 1909, track from Tosu through Haiki to Nagasaki was designated the Nagasaki Main Line. On 1 December 1934, another route was given the designation Nagasaki Main Line and the track from Haiki, through Haenosaki to Isahaya was designated the Ōmura Line. With the privatization of Japanese National Railways (JNR), the successor of JGR, on 1 April 1987, control of the station passed to JR Kyushu.

At the end of the Second World War, Japanese soldiers and civilians repatriated from overseas were housed in nearby Hario Island. After a period of quarantine, they were then transported home in special trains from Haenosaki Station. This part of the station history is written about on a sign board at the station.

== Passenger statistics ==
In fiscal 2014, there were a total of 6,423 boarding passengers, giving a daily average of 18 passengers.

== Surrounding area ==
- Haenosaki Post Office
- Sasebo City Office Miya Branch

== See also ==
- List of railway stations in Japan
