= Suwa Station =

Railway station in Ōmura, Nagasaki Prefecture, Japan

Suwa Station 諏訪駅
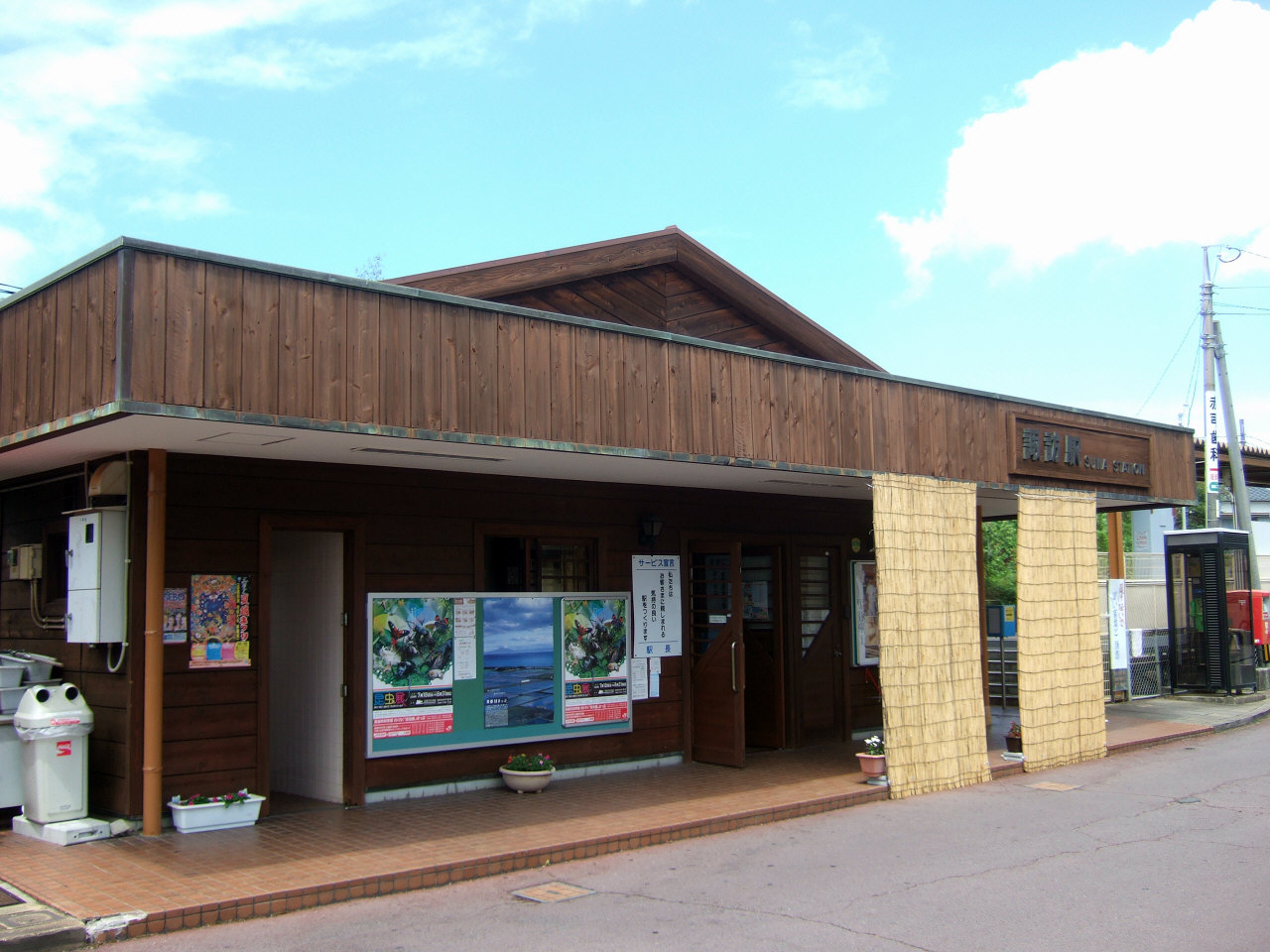
- Suwa Station in 2008

General information
- Location: Suwa 2-chome, Ōmura-shi, Nagasaki-ken 856-0024; Japan
- Coordinates: 32°55′25″N 129°57′37″E
- Operator: JR Kyushu
- Line: ■ Ōmura Line
- Distance: 34.8 km from Haiki
- Platforms: 1 side platform
- Tracks: 1

Construction
- Structure type: At grade
- Parking: Available
- Accessible: No - steps lead up to platform

Other information
- Status: Unstaffed
- Website: Official website

History
- Opened: 11 March 1989

Passengers
- FY2014: 262 daily

Services
| Preceding station | JR Kyushu | Following station |
|---|---|---|
| Ōmura towards Isahaya | Ōmura Line | Shin-Ōmura towards Haiki |
Location
- Location within Nagasaki Prefecture Location within Japan

Suwa Station (諏訪駅, Suwa-eki) is the railway station in Ōmura, Nagasaki Prefecture, Japan. It is operated by JR Kyushu and is on the Ōmura Line.

== Lines ==
The station is served by the Ōmura Line and is located 34.8 km from the starting point of the line at Haiki. Only local services on the line stop at the station. As of March 2019, a total of 37 trains per day make scheduled stops at Suwa Station: 19 in the direction of Nagasaki; and 18 in the direction of Sasebo.

== Station layout ==
The station consists of a side platform serving a single track. The station building is a modern timber structure which formerly housed a ticket window but which has become unstaffed. With the station building closed, there is a direct entrance to the platform via a flight of steps. A shelter and automatic ticket vending machine and SUGOCA card reader have been installed on the platform.

== History ==
JR Kyushu opened the station on 11 March 1989 as an additional station on the existing track of the Ōmura Line.

== Passenger statistics ==
In fiscal 2014, there were a total of 95,775 boarding passengers, giving a daily average of 262 passengers.

== Environs ==
- Omura City Nishi Omura Elementary School
- Omura City Chuo Elementary School
- Omura City Nishi Omura Junior High School
- Japan Ground Self-Defense Force Omura Garrison

== See also ==
- List of railway stations in Japan
