= Iwamatsu Station =

Railway station in Ōmura, Nagasaki Prefecture, Japan

Iwamatsu Station 岩松駅
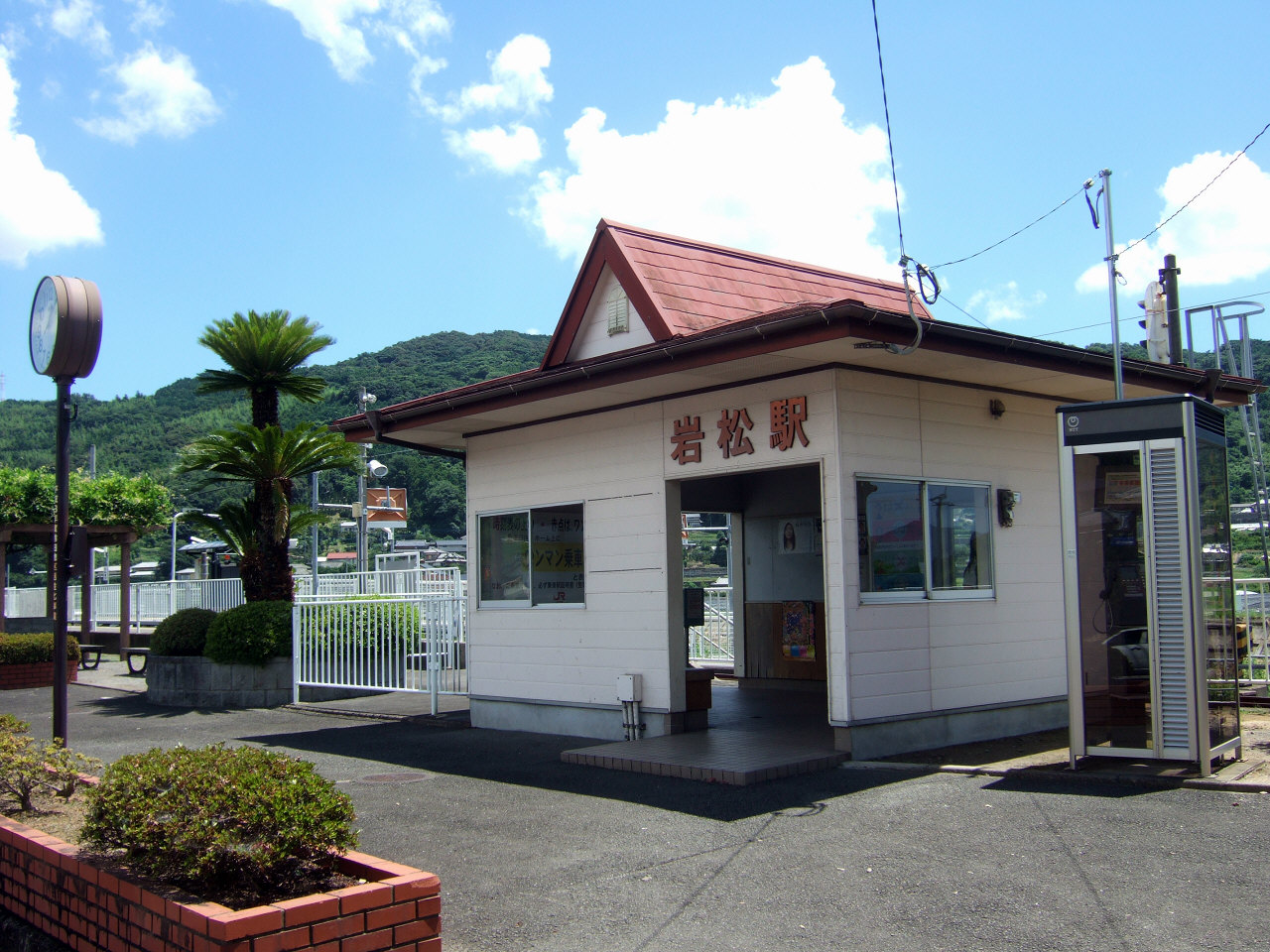
- Iwamatsu Station in 2008

General information
- Location: 947-2 Iwamatsu-machi, Ōmura-shi, Nagasaki-ken; Japan
- Coordinates: 32°53′25″N 129°58′52″E
- Operator: JR Kyushu
- Line: ■ Ōmura Line
- Distance: 40.0 km from Haiki
- Platforms: 2 side platforms
- Tracks: 2

Construction
- Structure type: At grade
- Parking: Available
- Accessible: No; steps lead up to station building

Other information
- Status: Unstaffed
- Website: Official website

History
- Opened: 20 April 1945

Passengers
- FY2014: 135 daily

Services
Preceding station	JR Kyushu	Following station
Isahaya Terminus	Ōmura Line	Ōmura towards Haiki
Location
- Location within Nagasaki Prefecture Location within Japan

Iwamatsu Station (岩松駅, Iwamatsu-eki) is a passenger railway station located in the city of Ōmura, Nagasaki Prefecture, Japan. It is operated by JR Kyushu.

== Lines ==
The station is served by the Ōmura Line and is located 40.0 km from the starting point of the line at Haiki. Only local services on the line stop at the station.

== Station layout ==
The station consists of two side platforms serving two tracks. The station building is a small timber structure and is unstaffed, housing only a waiting room. The two platforms are connected by a level crossing but there is a short flight of steps up from the access road and station forecourt to the station building.

=== Platforms ===
1	■ Ōmura Line	for Nagasaki
2	■ Ōmura Line	for Sasebo

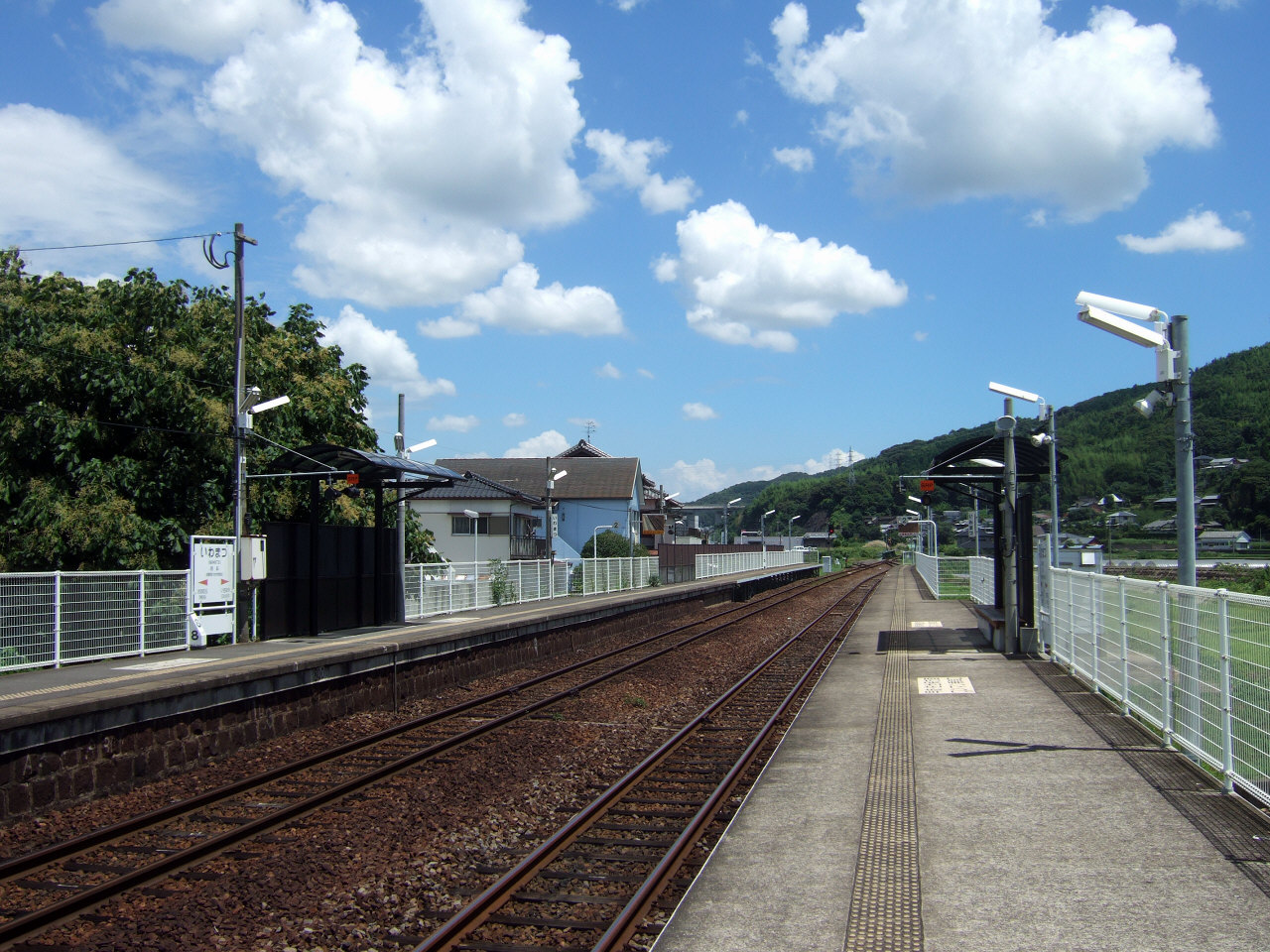
A view of the station platform and tracks.

== History ==
Japanese Government Railways (JGR) opened the station on 20 March 1945 as an additional station on the existing track of the Ōmura Line. With the privatization of Japanese National Railways (JNR), the successor of JGR, on 1 April 1987, control of the station passed to JR Kyushu.

== Passenger statistics ==
In fiscal 2014, there were a total of 49,349 boarding passengers, giving a daily average of 135 passengers.

== Environs ==
- National Route 34
- National Hospital Organization Nagasaki Medical Center

== See also ==
- List of railway stations in Japan
