= Ogushigō Station =

Railway station in Kawatana, Nagasaki Prefecture, Japan

Ogushigō Station 小串郷駅
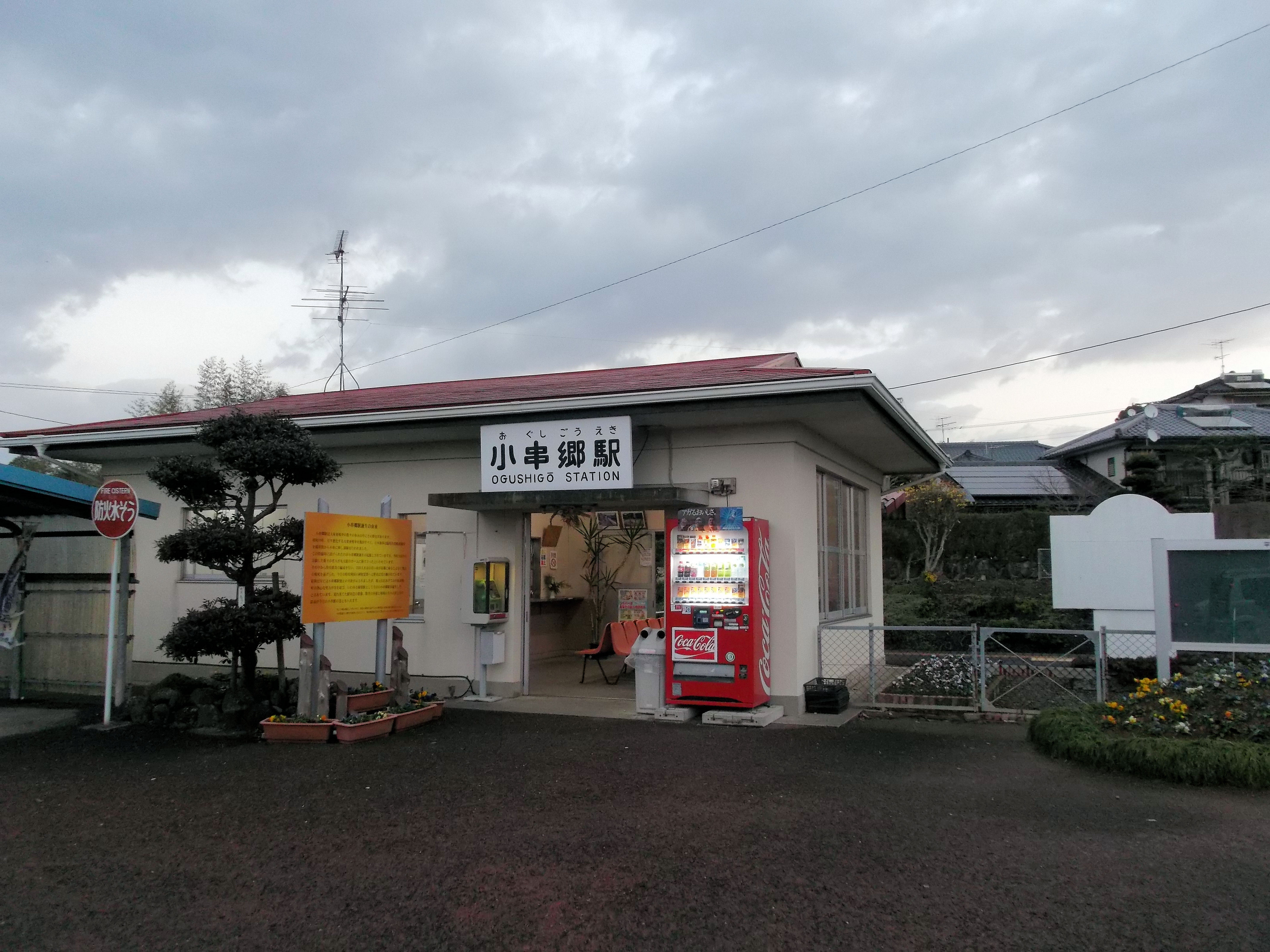
- Ogushigō Station in 2013

General information
- Location: Ogushigo, Kawatana, Higashisonogi-gun, Nagasaki-ken 859-3618; Japan
- Coordinates: 33°3′49.37″N 129°50′3.9″E
- Operator: JR Kyushu
- Line: ■ Ōmura Line
- Distance: 9.6 km from Haiki
- Platforms: 1 side platform
- Tracks: 1

Construction
- Structure type: At grade
- Cycle facilities: Bike shed

Other information
- Status: Kan'i itaku agent onsite
- Website: Official website

History
- Opened: 21 October 1944

Passengers
- FY2014: 110 daily

Services
Preceding station	JR Kyushu	Following station
Kawatana towards Isahaya	Ōmura Line	Haenosaki towards Haiki
Location
- Location within Nagasaki Prefecture Location within Japan

Ogushigō Station (小串郷駅, Ogushigō-eki) is a passenger railway station located in the town of Kawatana, Nagasaki Prefecture, Japan. It is operated by JR Kyushu.

== Lines ==
The station is served by the Ōmura Line and is located 9.6 km from the starting point of the line at Haiki. Besides the local services on the line, some trains of the Rapid Seaside Liner also stop at the station.

== Station layout ==
The station consists of a side platform serving a single tracks. The station building is a steel frame structure of modern design and houses a waiting room and ticket window. A bike shed is located outside at the station forecourt. A footbridge allows pedestrians to cross from one side of the tracks to the other.

The station is unstaffed by JR Kyushu but a kan'i itaku agent operates the ticket window and sells some types of tickets.

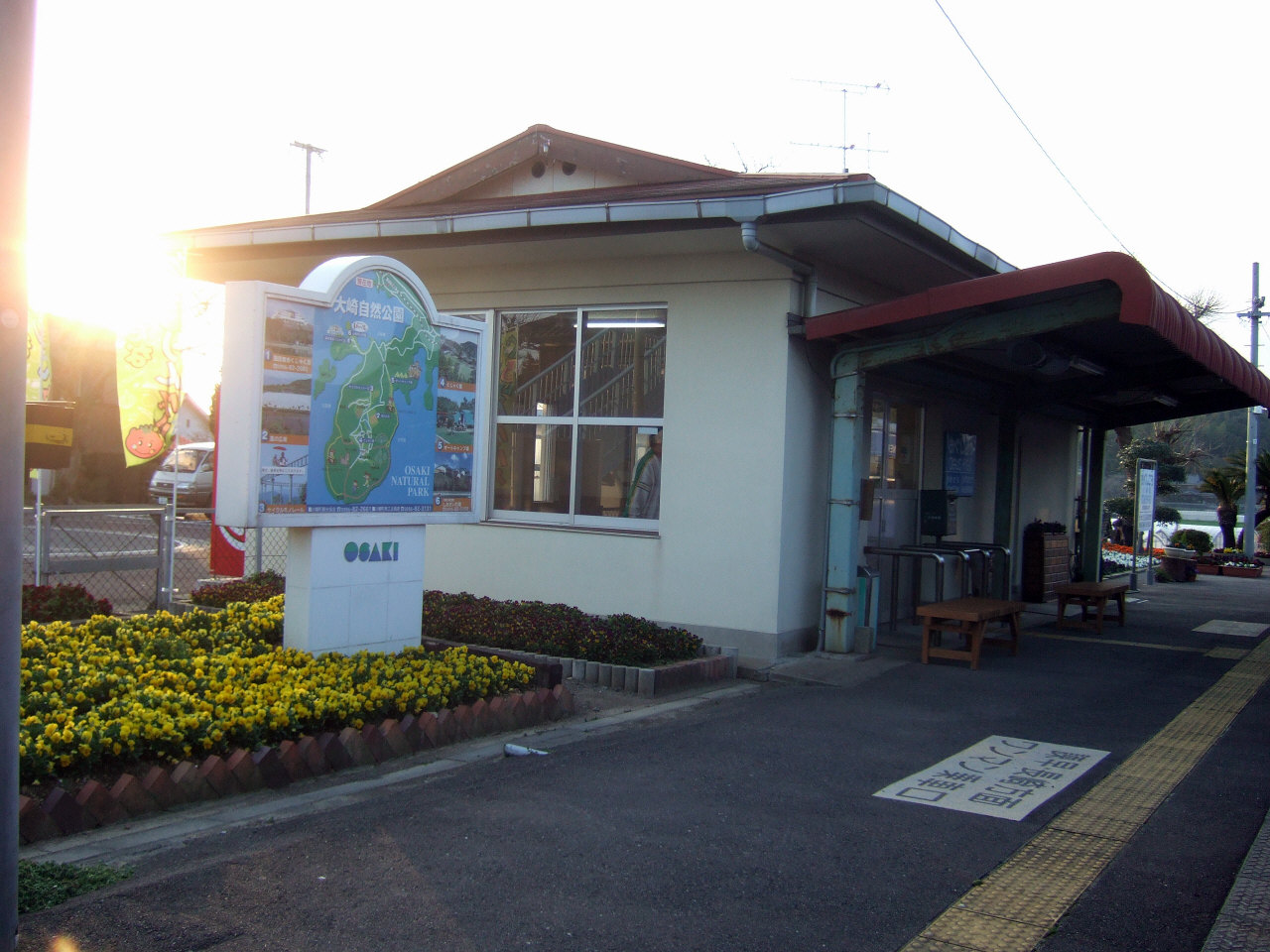
Station building as seen from platform

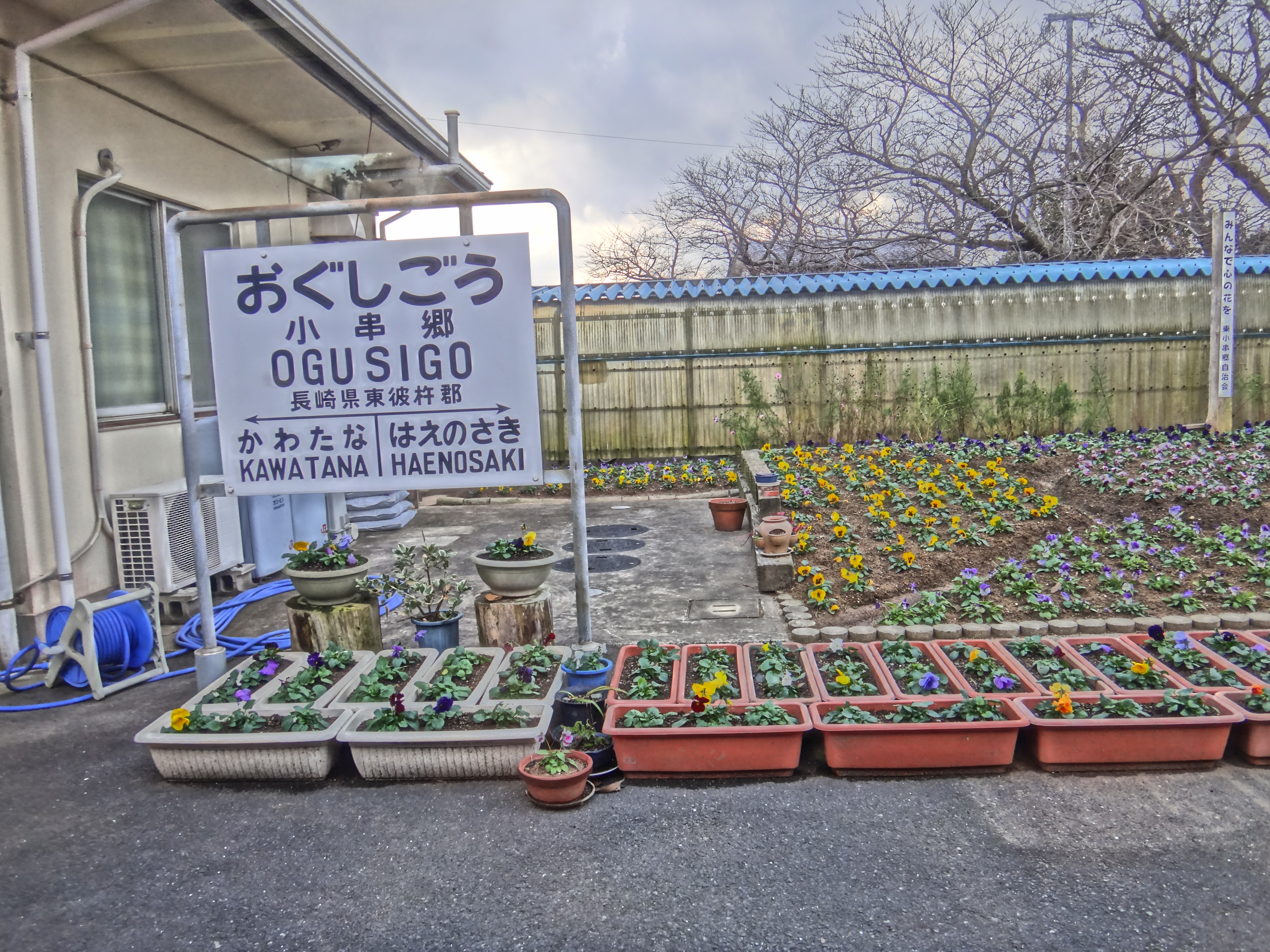
Station sign

== History ==
Japanese Government Railways (JGR) opened the station on 21 October 1944 as an additional station on the existing track of the Ōmura Line. With the privatization of Japanese National Railways (JNR), the successor of JGR, on 1 April 1987, control of the station passed to JR Kyushu.

== Passenger statistics ==
In fiscal 2014, there were a total of 40,082 boarding passengers, giving a daily average of 110 passengers.

== Environs ==
- Ogushi Post Office
- Japan National Route 205

== See also ==
- List of railway stations in Japan
