= Shin-Tosu Station =

Railway station in Tosu, Saga Prefecture, Japan

JH 02 Shin-Tosu Station 新鳥栖駅
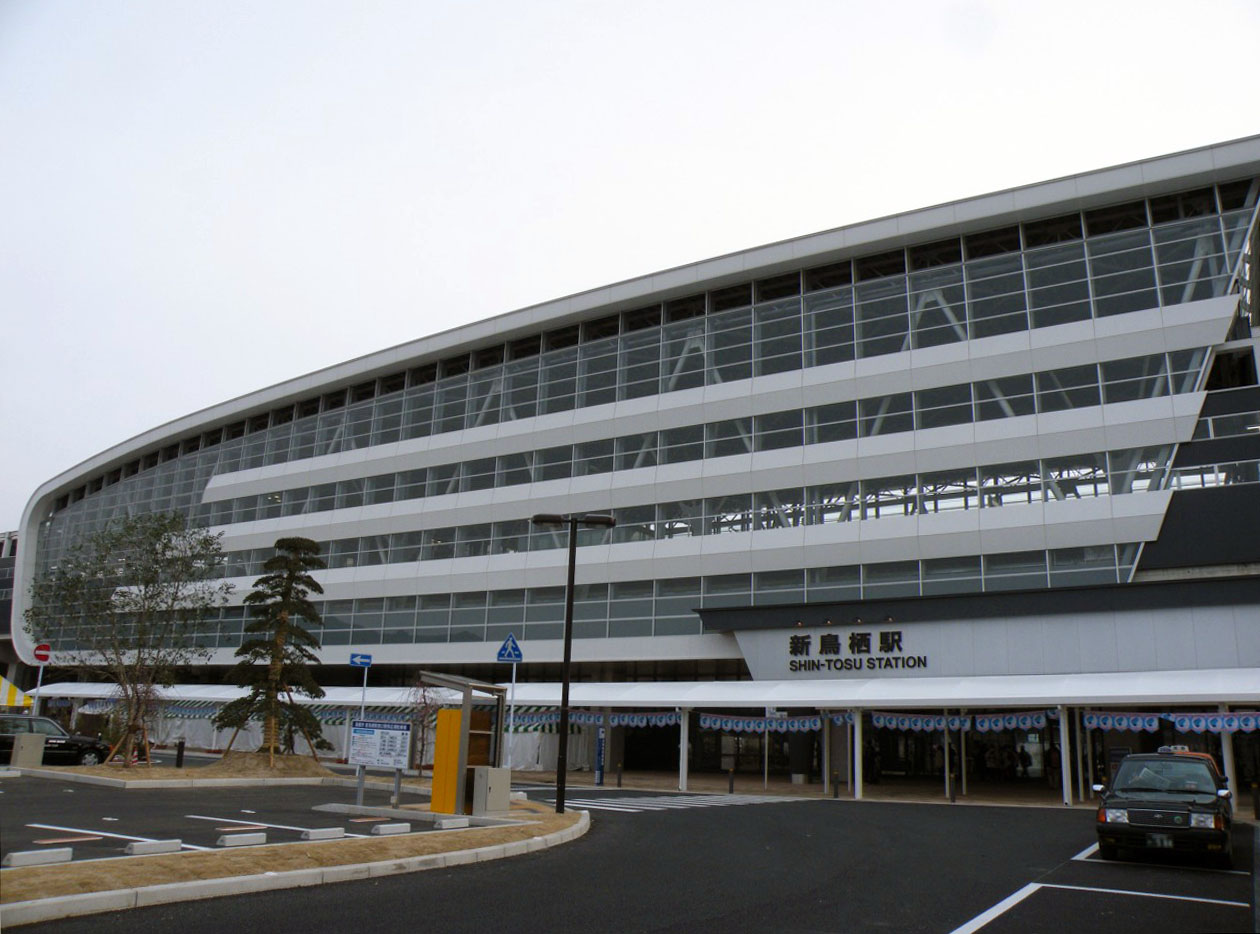
- Shin-Tosu Station in March 2011

General information
- Location: 220-2 Harakogacho, Tosu-shi, Saga-ken; Japan
- Coordinates: 33°22′13″N 130°29′28″E
- Operator: JR Kyushu
- Lines: Kyūshū Shinkansen; Nagasaki Line
- Distance: 28.6 km from Hakata
- Platforms: 2 island platforms (Shinkansen), 2 side platforms (conventional lines)
- Tracks: 6 (4 Shinkansen, 2 conventional)

Construction
- Structure type: Elevated (Shinkansen); At grade (conventional line)
- Accessible: Yes

Other information
- Status: Staffed (Midori no Madoguchi)
- Station code: JH02

History
- Opened: 12 March 2011

Passengers
- FY2022: 1061

Services
Preceding station	JR Kyushu	Following station
Shinkansen
Kurume towards Kagoshima-Chūō	Kyūshū Shinkansen Sakura Tsubame	Hakata Terminus
Limited express
Saga towards Takeo-Onsen	Relay Kamome	Tosu towards Hakata
Saga towards Sasebo or Huis Ten Bosch	Midori and Huis Ten Bosch	Tosu towards Hakata
Local
Hizen-Fumoto JH 03 towards Nagasaki	Nagasaki Line	Tosu JH 01 Terminus
Location
- Location within Saga Prefecture Location within Kyushu Location within Japan

Shin-Tosu Station (新鳥栖駅, Shin-Tosu-eki) is a junction passenger railway station located in the city of Tosu, Saga, Japan. It is operated by JR Kyushu.

== Lines ==
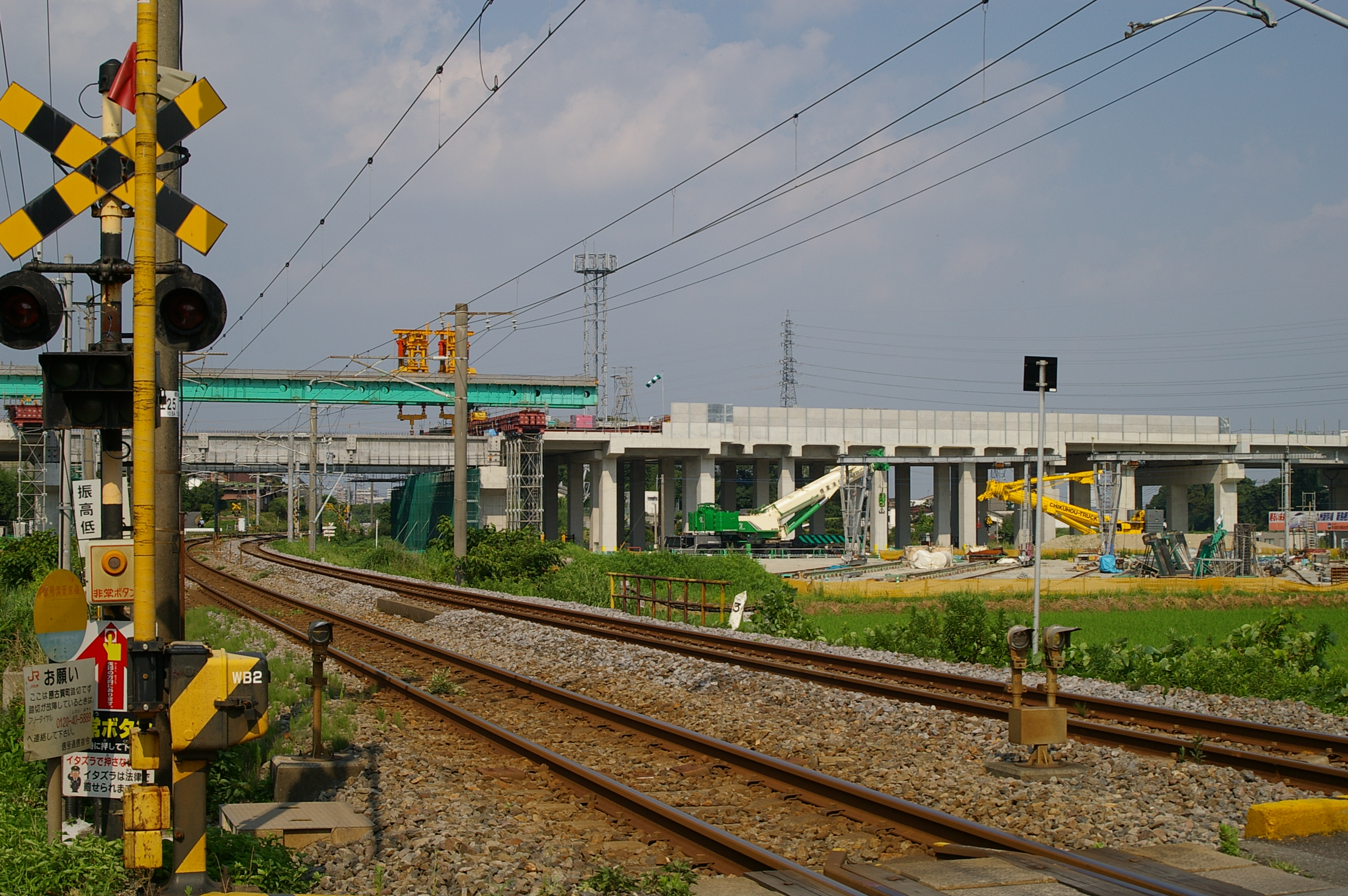
Shin-Tosu Station under construction in July 2007

Shin-Tosu Station is served by the Kyushu Shinkansen and is 28.6 kilometers from Hakata and 650.9 kilometers from Shin-Osaka. The station is also served by the Kagoshima Main Line and is located 2.9 km from the starting point of the line at Tosu. Nagasaki Main Line. A short walkway forms the connection between these two platforms, but passengers must pass through the Shinkansen and convention ticket gates to transfer.

== Station layout ==
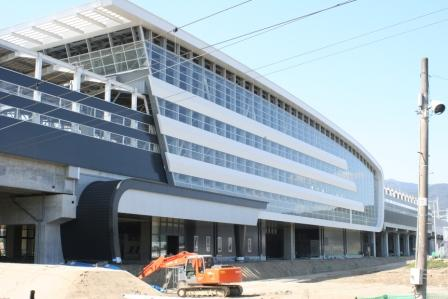
Shin-Tosu Station under construction from East Entrance on 21 March 2010

The Shinkansen station consists of two elevated island platforms serving four tracks. Tracks 11 and 14 on the Shinkansen are not normally used. The conventional line has two opposed ground-level side platforms located directly underneath the Shinkansen platforms. The station has a Midori no Madoguchi staffed ticket office.

Tracks
1	■Limited express: Kamome, Midori, Huis Ten Bosch	for Tosu and Hakata
1	■Nagasaki Main Line	for Tosu
2	■Limited express: Kamome, Midori, Huis Ten Bosch	for Saga, Hizen-Yamaguchi, Nagasaki, Sasebo, and Huis Ten Bosch
2	■Nagasaki Main Line	for Saga, Hizen-Yamaguchi, Isahaya
11,12	Kyūshū Shinkansen	for Hakata and Shin-Ōsaka
13,14	Kyushu Shinkansen	for Kumamoto and Kagoshima-Chūō

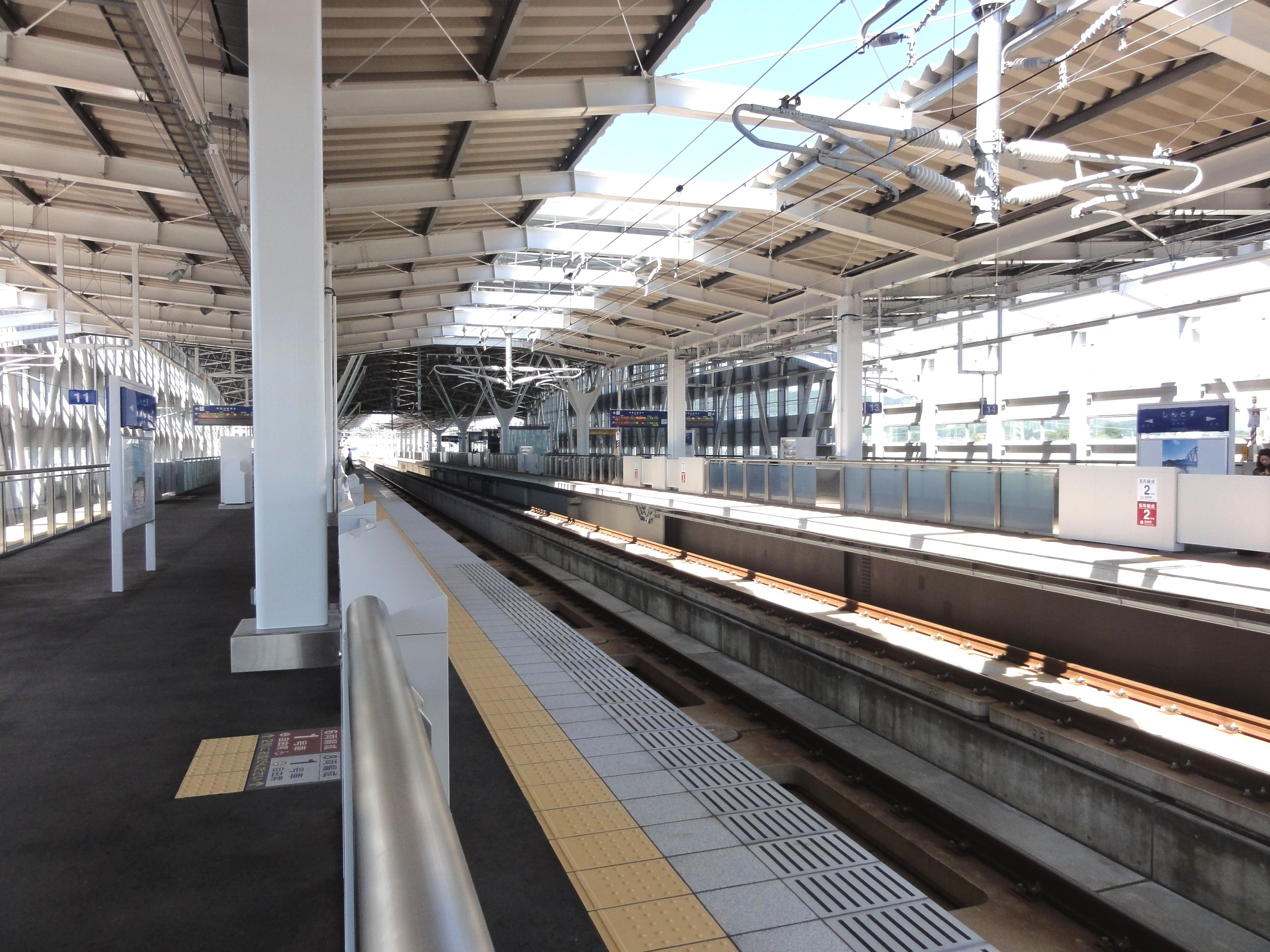
Shin-Tosu Station-Shinkansen-Platform

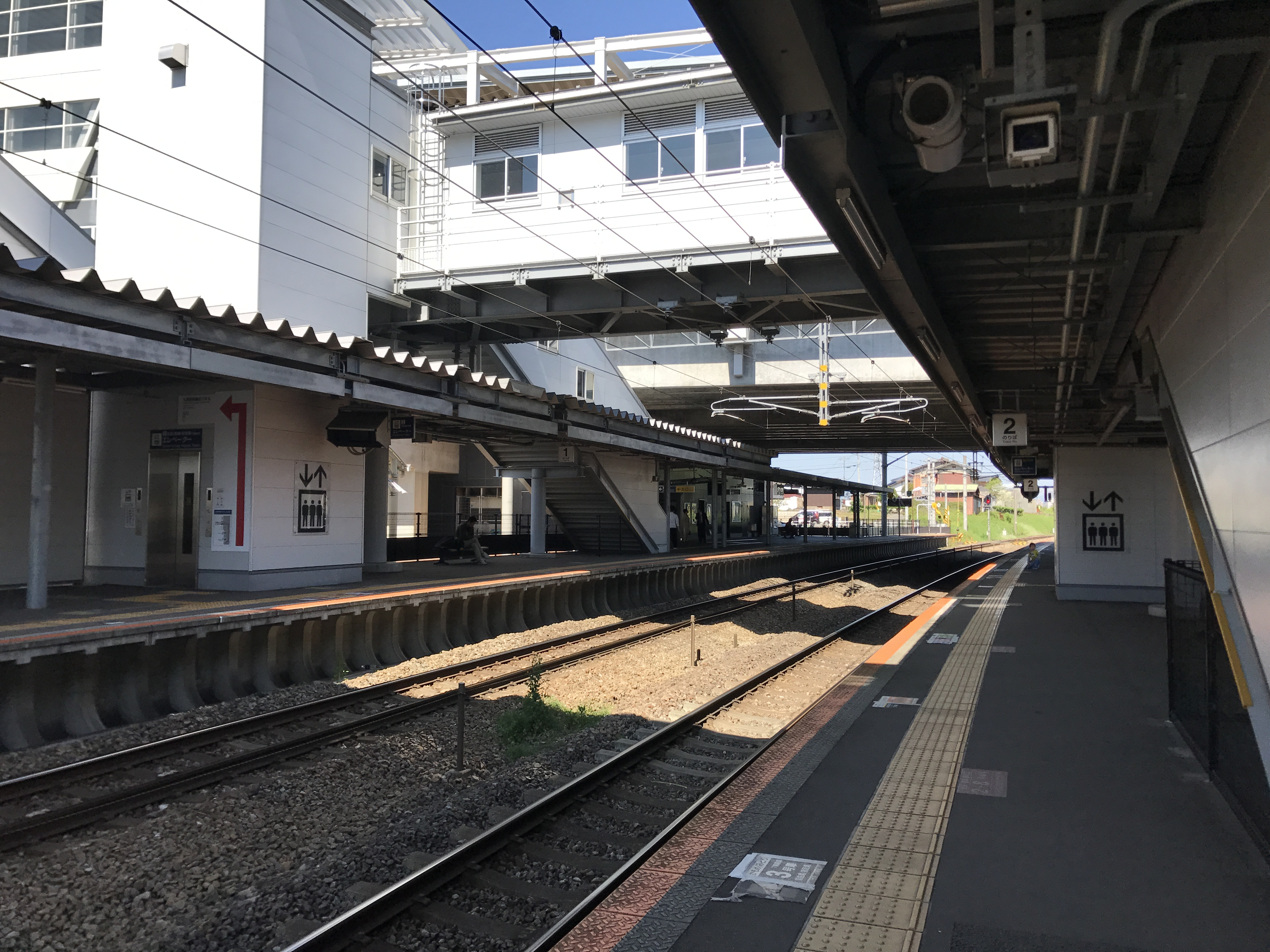
Nagasaki Main Line Platform

== History ==
The name of the station was officially announced by JR Kyushu on December 17, 2010. Shin-Tosu Station opened for revenue service on March 12, 2011. The station is planned to be the junction point between the Kyushu Shinkansen and Nishi Kyushu Shinkansen once the latter line's extension opens.

== Passenger statistics ==
In fiscal 2020, the station was used by an average of 1064 passengers daily (boarding passengers only), and it ranked 126th among the busiest stations of JR Kyushu.

== Surrounding area ==
On the east side (along Prefectural Road 31 and Fukuoka Prefectural Road/Saga Prefectural Road 17 Kurume Kiyama-Chikushino Line), many suburban stores have been located since before the station opened. To the west is a quiet residential area.

== See also ==
- List of railway stations in Japan
