= Huis Ten Bosch (train) =

Japanese limited express train service

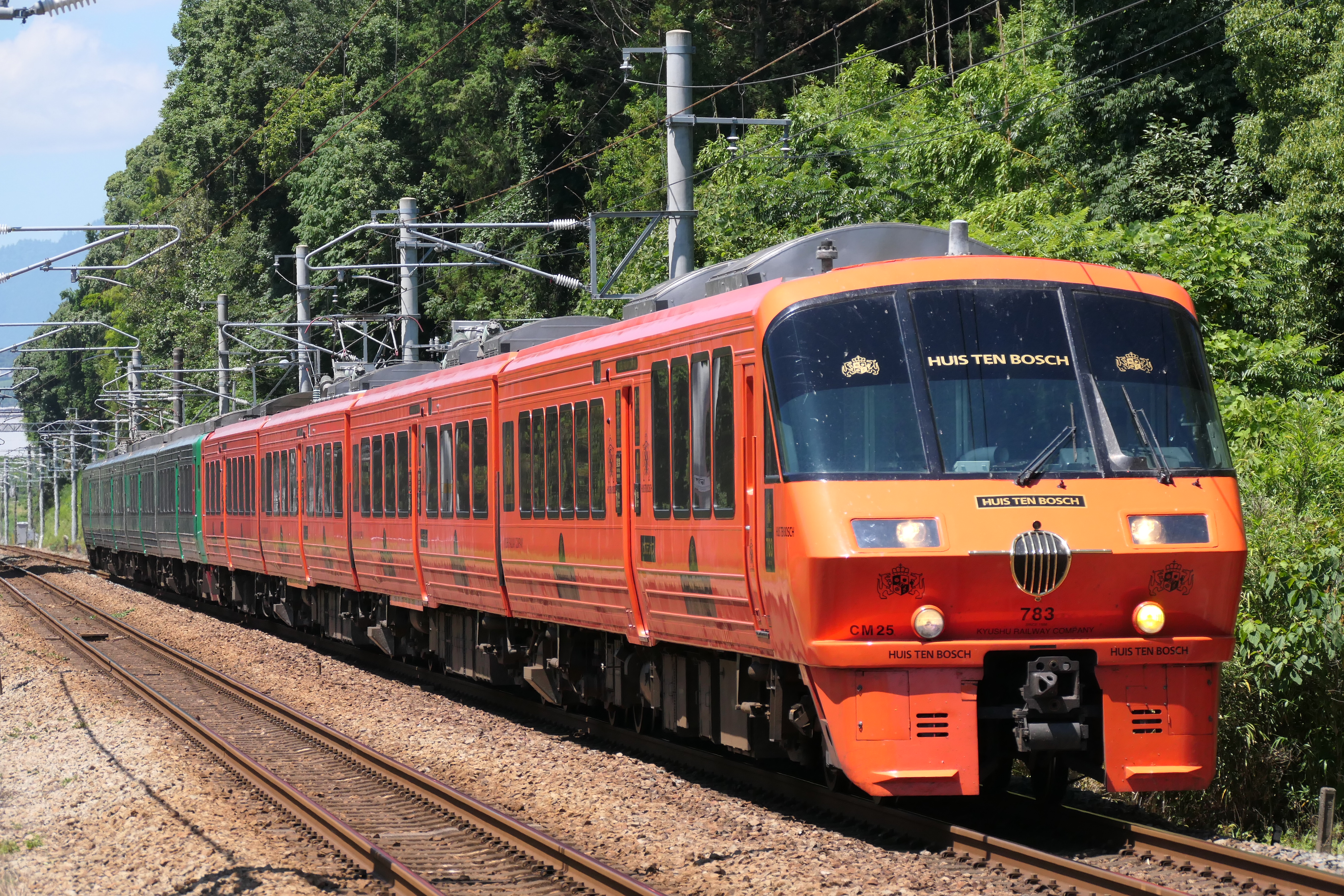
- 783 series train on a Huis Ten Bosch service

Overview
- Service type: Limited express
- First service: 25 March 1992
- Current operator: JR Kyushu

Route
- Termini: Hakata; Huis Ten Bosch
- Stops: 10
- Lines used: Kagoshima, Nagasaki, Sasebo, Ōmura

Technical
- Rolling stock: 783 series
- Track gauge: 1,067 mm (3 ft 6 in)
- Electrification: Overhead line, 20 kV 60 Hz AC
- Operating speed: 130 km/h (81 mph)

The Huis Ten Bosch (Japanese: ハウステンボス, Hepburn: Hausu Ten Bosu) is a limited express train service operated by Kyushu Railway Company (JR Kyushu) in Japan. It runs between Hakata Station in Fukuoka, Fukuoka, and Huis Ten Bosch Station, the station for the Huis Ten Bosch theme park in Sasebo, Nagasaki.

Trains are coupled with Midori services between Hakata and Haiki.

Huis Ten Bosch services started on 25 March 1992.

== Stops ==
Trains stop at the following stations:

Hakata - Futsukaichi - Tosu - Shin-Tosu - Saga - Kōhoku - Takeo-Onsen - Arita - Haiki - Huis Ten Bosch

== Rolling stock ==
Services are typically formed of 4-car 783 series electric multiple unit (EMU) sets with Green Car (first class) accommodation. All cars are non-smoking.

| | ← Huis Ten Bosch Hakata → | | | | | |
| Car No. | 1 | | 2 | 3 | | 4 |
| Accommodation | Green | Reserved | Reserved | Reserved | Non-reserved | Non-reserved |
