= Ōmura Line =

Railway line in Nagasaki Prefecture, Japan

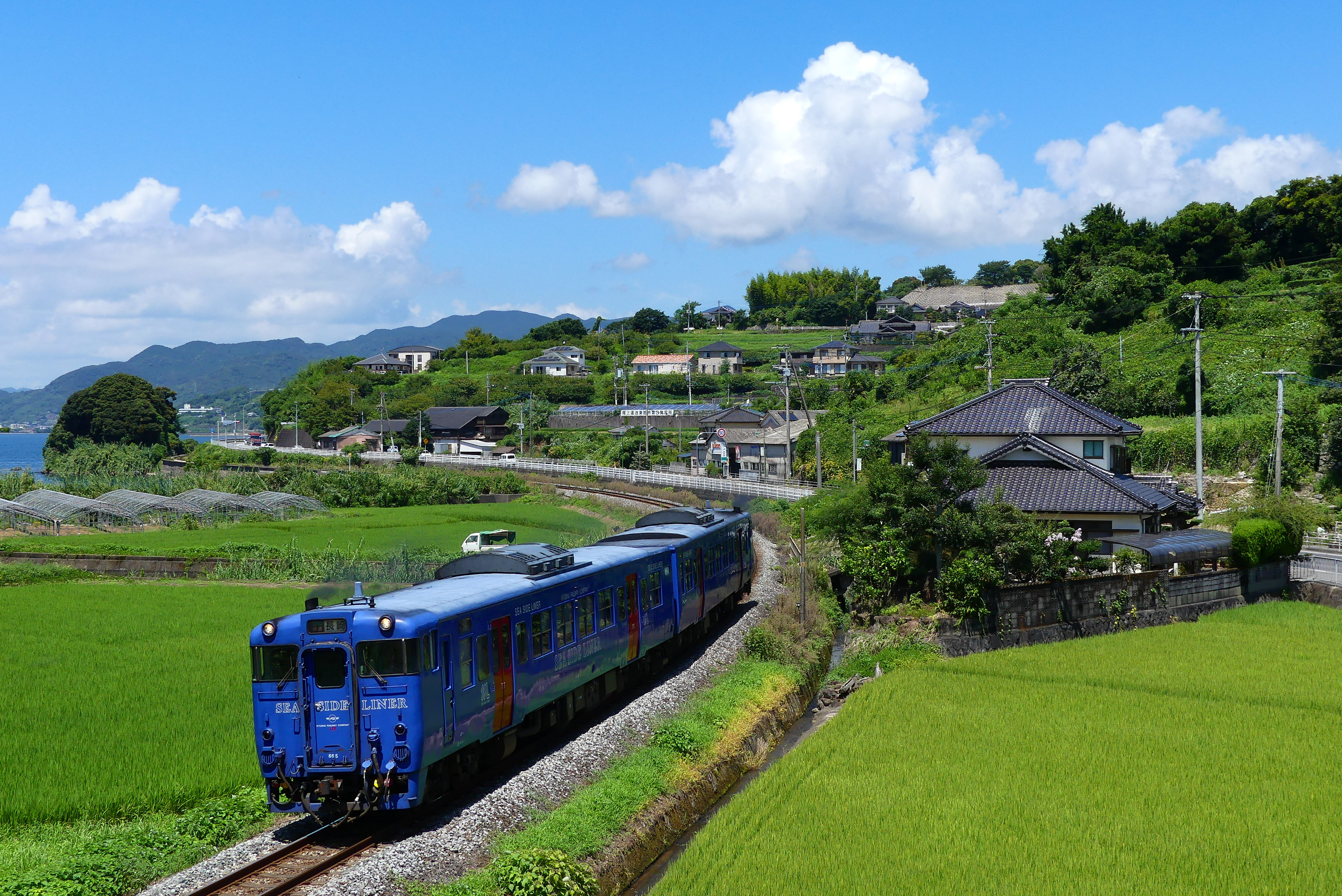
- Diesel train on the Ōmura Line

Overview
- Owner: JR Kyushu
- Locale: Kyushu
- Termini: Haiki; Isahaya
- Stations: 15

Service
- Type: Heavy rail
- Operator: JR Kyushu

History
- Opened: 20 January 1898; 128 years ago

Technical
- Line length: 47.6 km (29.6 mi)
- Number of tracks: 1
- Track gauge: 1,067 mm (3 ft 6 in)
- Electrification: Overhead line, 20 kV 60 Hz AC (Haiki–Huis Ten Bosch)
- Operating speed: 95 km/h (59 mph)
- Signalling: Automatic block signaling
Route map
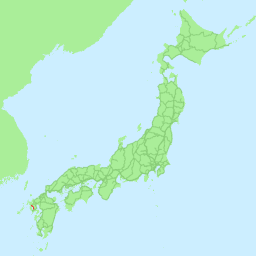

The Ōmura Line (Japanese: 大村線, Hepburn: Ōmura-sen) is a railway line in Nagasaki Prefecture, Japan, operated by the Kyushu Railway Company (JR Kyushu). It connects Haiki Station in Sasebo to Isahaya Station in Isahaya. After opening in 1898, it was part of the Nagasaki Main Line until the section between Hizen-Yamaguchi (now Kōhoku) and Isahaya opened in 1934.

== History ==
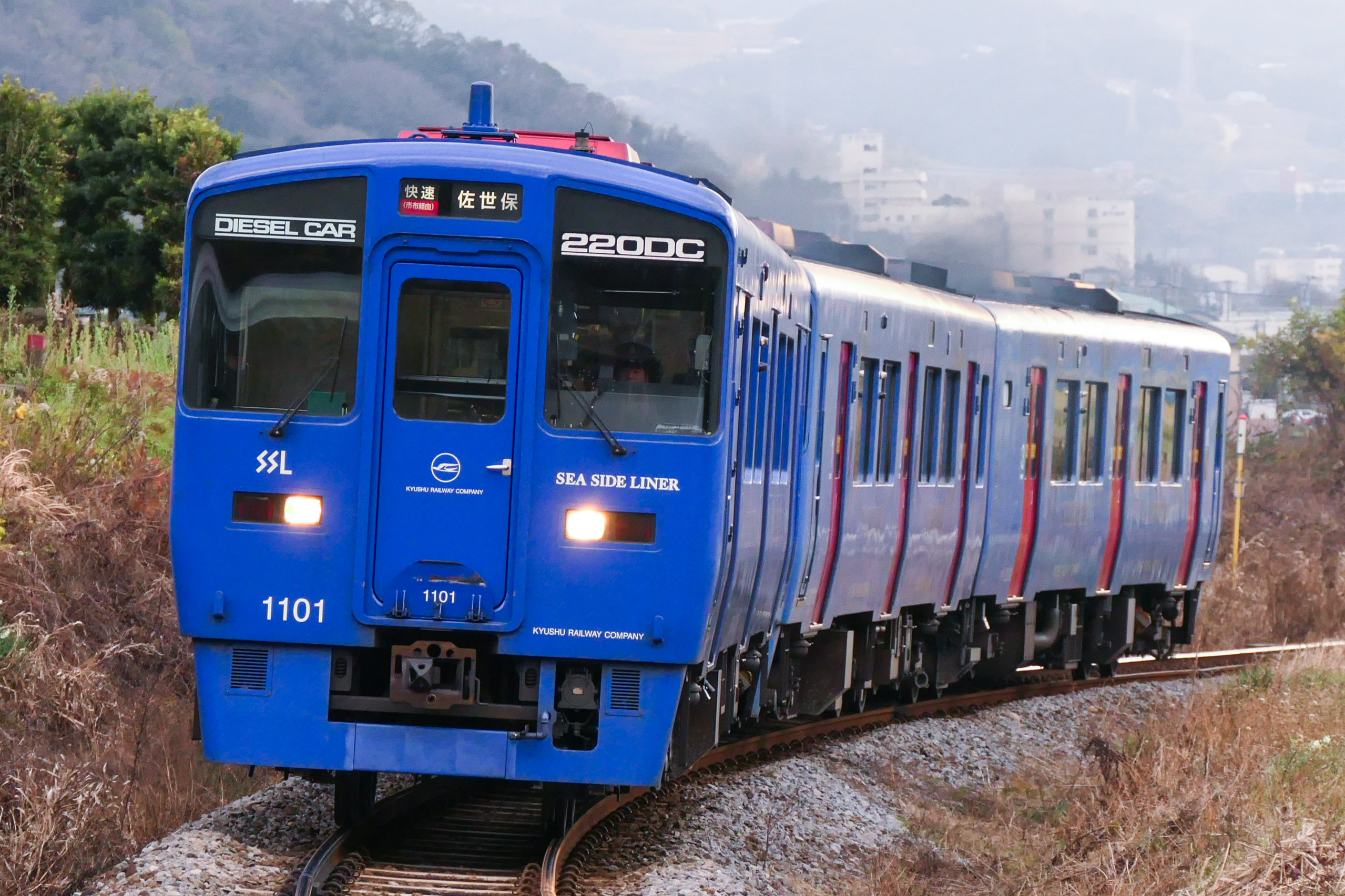
Rapid train Seaside Liner on the Ōmura Line

The Kyushu Railway Co. opened the entire line in 1898 as part of the original Nagasaki Main Line. The company was nationalised in 1907.

With the opening of the Hizen Yamaguchi - Isahaya section of the Nagasaki Main Line in 1934, the line was renamed the Omura Line.

In 1992 4.7-kilometre (2.9 mi) section between Haiki and Huis Ten Bosch was electrified at 20 kV 60 Hz AC to allow operations of the Huis Ten Bosch.

== Stations ==
Legend:

●	All trains stop
｜	All trains pass

Name	Distance from Haiki	Local	Seaside Liner (Rapid)	Transfers	Location	
↑ Seaside Liner through services to Sasebo via the Sasebo Line ↑
Haiki	0	●	●	Sasebo Line	Sasebo	Nagasaki Prefecture
Huis Ten Bosch	4.7 km (2.9 mi)	●	●		Sasebo	Nagasaki Prefecture
Haenosaki	5.6 km (3.5 mi)	●	|		Sasebo	Nagasaki Prefecture
Ogushigō	9.6 km (6.0 mi)	●	|		Kawatana, Higashisonogi District	Nagasaki Prefecture
Kawatana	13.6 km (8.5 mi)	●	●		Kawatana, Higashisonogi District	Nagasaki Prefecture
Sonogi	19.6 km (12.2 mi)	●	●		Higashisonogi, Higashisonogi District	Nagasaki Prefecture
Chiwata	24.0 km (14.9 mi)	●	|		Higashisonogi, Higashisonogi District	Nagasaki Prefecture
Matsubara	28.5 km (17.7 mi)	●	|		Ōmura	Nagasaki Prefecture
Ōmura Rail Yard	31.1 km (19.3 mi)	●	▲		Ōmura	Nagasaki Prefecture
Takematsu	32.8 km (20.4 mi)	●	●		Ōmura	Nagasaki Prefecture
Shin-Ōmura	33.7 km (20.9 mi)	●	●	Nishi Kyushu Shinkansen	Ōmura	Nagasaki Prefecture
Suwa	34.8 km (21.6 mi)	●	|		Ōmura	Nagasaki Prefecture
Ōmura	36.2 km (22.5 mi)	●	●		Ōmura	Nagasaki Prefecture
Iwamatsu	40.0 km (24.9 mi)	●	|		Ōmura	Nagasaki Prefecture
Isahaya	47.6 km (29.6 mi)	●	●	Nishi Kyushu Shinkansen; Nagasaki Line; ■ Shimabara Railway Line	Isahaya	Nagasaki Prefecture
↓ Seaside Liner through services to Nagasaki via the Nagasaki Main Line ↓
