= Kawatana, Nagasaki =

Kawatana 川棚町
- Town
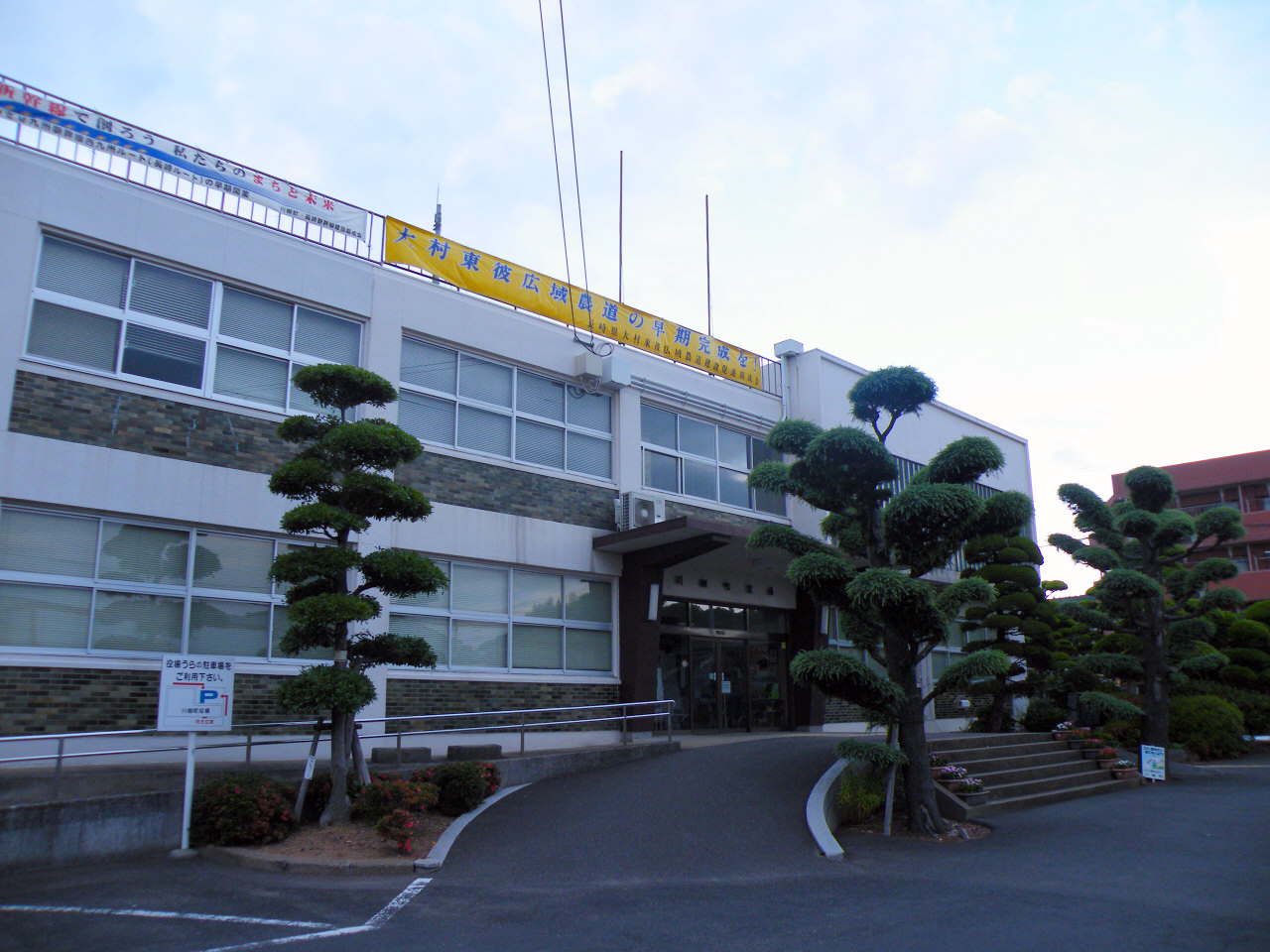
- Kawatana Town Office

- Flag Emblem
- Interactive map of Kawatana
- Location in Japan
- Coordinates: 33°04′22″N 129°51′41″E
- Country: Japan
- Region: Kyushu
- Prefecture: Nagasaki
- District: Higashisonogi

Government
  - Mayor: Fumio Yamaguchi

Area
  - Total: 37.25 km^{2} (14.38 sq mi)

Population (June 1, 2024)
  - Total: 13,071
  - Density: 350.9/km^{2} (908.8/sq mi)
- Time zone: UTC+09:00 (JST)
- City hall address: 1518-1 Nakagumigo, Kawatana-cho, Higashisonogi-gun, Nagasaki-ken 859-3692
- Website: Official website
- Symbols
- Bird: Indian peafowl
- Flower: Tiger Lily
- Tree: Ternstroemia gymnanthera

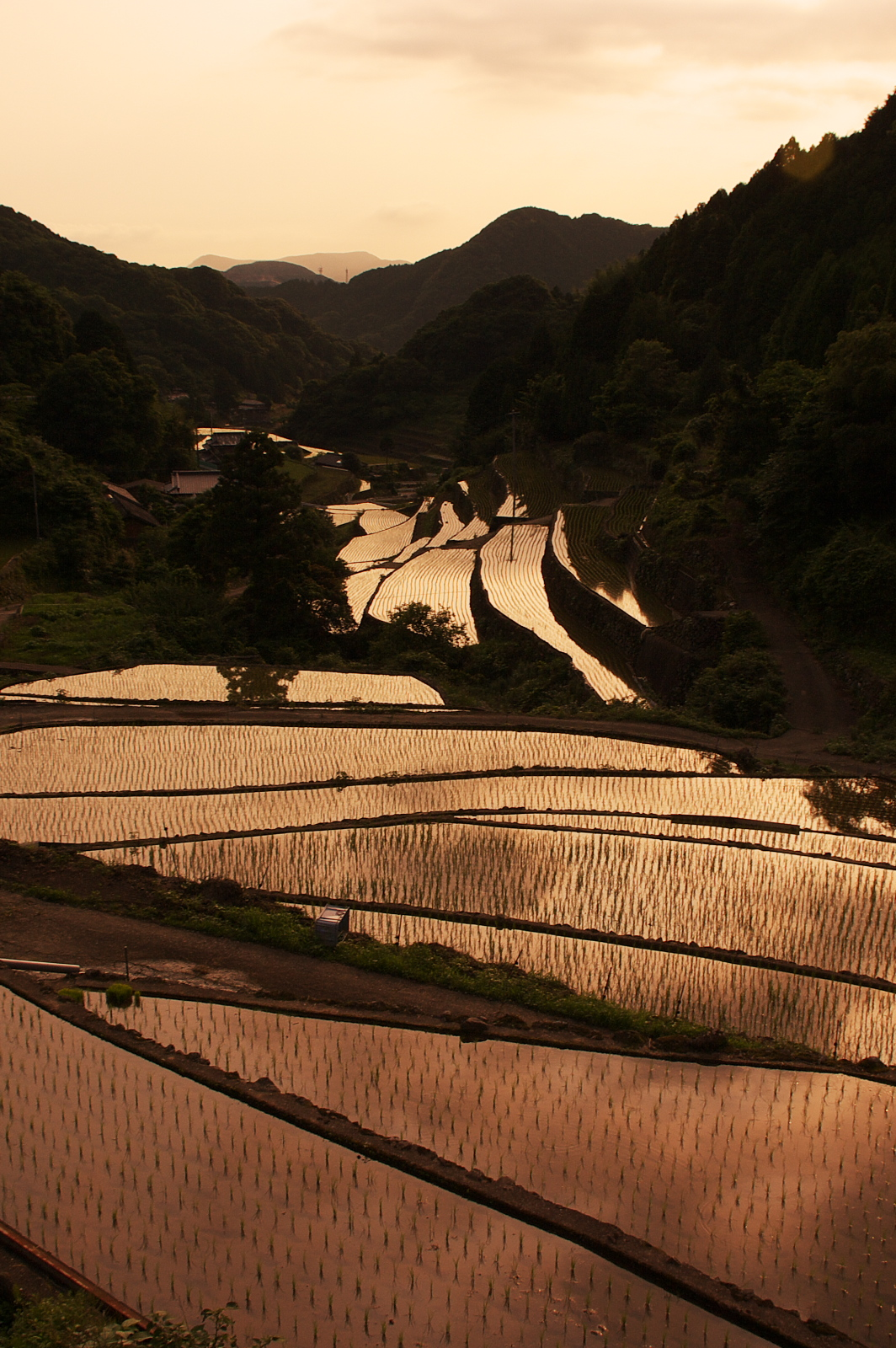
Rice terraces in Tanada

Kawatana (川棚町, Kawatana-chō) is a town located in Higashisonogi District, Nagasaki Prefecture, Japan. As of 1 June 2024, the town had an estimated population of 13,071 in 5740 households, and a population density of 200 people per km^{2}. The total area is 37.25 km^{2} (14.38 sq mi).

== Geography ==
Kawatana is located in the central area of Nagasaki Prefecture, on the northern coast of Ōmura Bay. The Kawatana River flows through the town. The eastern part of the town is mountainous, centered around Mount Kokuzo, and has little flat land, while the western part is a series of hills backed by Mount Shiradake, with much cultivated land. The Kawatana River basin is covered with rice paddies. The western coast facing Ōmura Bay is a ria coast, and the sea is dotted with small islands. The Osaki Peninsula is an area where obsidian is produced, and Ogushi was famous for producing natural pearls.

=== Surrounding municipalities ===
Nagasaki Prefecture

- Hasami
- Higashisonogi
- Sasebo

Saga Prefecture

- Ureshino

=== Climate ===
Kawatana has a humid subtropical climate (Köppen Cfa) characterized by warm summers and cool winters with light to no snowfall. The average annual temperature in Kawatana is 16.0 °C. The average annual rainfall is 1864 mm with September as the wettest month. The temperatures are highest on average in August, at around 26.6 °C, and lowest in January, at around 6.0 °C.

=== Demographics ===
Per Japanese census data, the population of Kawatana is as shown below:

Historical population
Year	Pop.	±%
1940	7,546	—
1950	15,936	+111.2%
1960	14,633	−8.2%
1970	13,409	−8.4%
1980	14,479	+8.0%
1990	14,599	+0.8%
2000	15,325	+5.0%
2010	14,651	−4.4%
2020	13,377	−8.7%

== History ==
The area of Kawatana was part of ancient Hizen Province. During the Edo Period, the area was under the control of Ōmura Domain. After the Meiji restoration, the village Kawatana was established with the creation of the modern municipalities system on April 1, 1889. Kawatana was raised to town status on November 3, 1947.

== Government ==
Kawatana has a mayor-council form of government with a directly elected mayor and a unicameral town council of 14 members. Kawatana, collectively with the town of Hasami, contributes one member to the Nagasaki Prefectural Assembly. In terms of national politics, the city is part of the Nagasaki 3rd district of the lower house of the Diet of Japan.

== Economy ==
During World War II, manufacturing facilities associated with the Sasebo Naval Arsenal were constructed in Kawatana, leading to a temporary increase in population. The economy of the area is now heavily dependent on agriculture and commercial fishing.

== Education ==
Kawatana has three public elementary schools and one public junior high school by the town government, and one public high school operated by the Nagasaki Prefectural Board of Education.The prefecture also operates two special education schools for the handicapped.

== Transportation ==
=== Railways ===
(JR Kyushu) - Ōmura Line

- ■ Ogushigō - Kawatana

=== Highways ===
- National Route 205

== Notable people from Kawatana ==
- Tomonaga Sanjūrō, academic, philosopher
