= Ōmura Station (Nagasaki) =

Railway station in Ōmura, Nagasaki Prefecture, Japan

Ōmura Station 大村駅
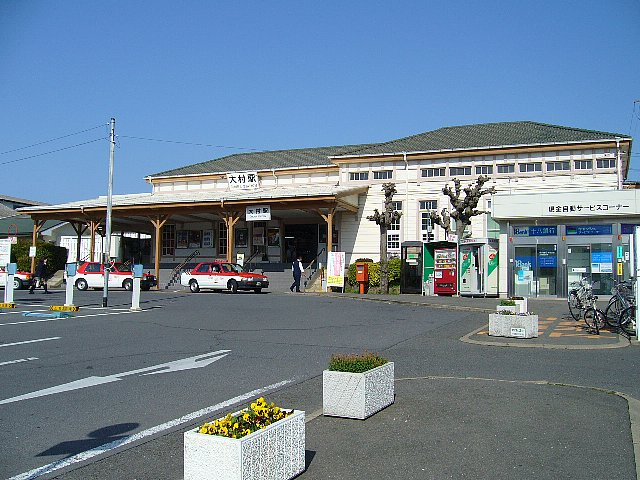
- Ōmura Station in 2006

General information
- Location: Higashihonmachi, Ōmura-shi, Nagasaki-ken 856-0831; Japan
- Coordinates: 32°54′39″N 129°57′44″E
- Operator: JR Kyushu
- Line: ■ Ōmura Line
- Distance: 36.2 km from Haiki
- Platforms: 2 side platforms
- Tracks: 2 + 1 siding

Construction
- Structure type: At grade
- Accessible: No - platforms linked by footbridge

Other information
- Status: Staffed ticket window (Midori no Madoguchi) (outsourced)
- Website: Official website

History
- Opened: 20 January 1898

Passengers
- FY2020: 1920 daily
- Rank: 75th (among JR Kyushu stations)

Services
Preceding station	JR Kyushu	Following station
Iwamatsu towards Isahaya	Ōmura Line Local	Suwa towards Haiki
Isahaya Terminus	Ōmura Line Seaside Liner	Takematsu towards Haiki
Location
- Location within Nagasaki Prefecture Location within Japan

Ōmura Station (大村駅, Ōmura-eki) is the major railway station in the city of Ōmura, Nagasaki Prefecture, Japan. It is operated by JR Kyushu.

== Lines ==
The station is served by the Ōmura Line and is located 36.2 km from the starting point of the line at Haiki. Besides the local services on the line, the Rapid Seaside Liner also stops at the station.

== Station layout ==
The station consists of two staggered side platforms serving two tracks. A siding branches off track 1. The station building is a timber building of traditional Japanese design which was built in 1918. It houses a waiting room, a kiosk, automatic ticket vending machines and a staffed ticket window. Access to the opposite side platform is by means of a footbridge.

Management of the station has been outsourced to the JR Kyushu Tetsudou Eigyou Co., a wholly owned subsidiary of JR Kyushu specialising in station services. It staffs the ticket window which is equipped with a Midori no Madoguchi facility.

The station building also houses the facilities of a community radio station "FM Omura 76.3".

=== Platforms ===
1	■ Ōmura Line	for Huis ten Bosch and Sasebo
2	■ Ōmura Line	for Isahaya and Nagasaki

== History ==
The private Kyushu Railway, in building a line to Nagasaki, had opened a track from Tosu to Saga and Takeo (today Takeo-Onsen) by 5 May 1895 and Haiki by 10 July 1897. In the next phase of expansion, the track was extended south along the east coast of Ōmura Bay, with Ōmura opening as the new terminus on 20 January 1898. It became a through-station on 27 November that year when the track was further extended to Isahaya, Kikitsu and linking up with an earlier at Nagayo, achieving through-traffic to Urakami, then known as Nagasaki. When the Kyushu Railway was nationalized on 1 July 1907, Japanese Government Railways (JGR) took over control of the station. On 12 October 1909, track from Tosu through Haiki and Ōmura to Nagasaki was designated the Nagasaki Main Line. On 1 December 1934, another route along the coast of the Ariake Sea designated as the Nagasaki Main Line. The track from Haiki through Ōmura to Isahaya became designated as the Ōmura Line. With the privatization of Japanese National Railways (JNR), the successor of JGR, on 1 April 1987, control of the station passed to JR Kyushu.

== Passenger statistics ==
In fiscal 2020, the station was used by an average of 1920 passengers daily (boarding passengers only), and it ranked 75th among the busiest stations of JR Kyushu.

== Surrounding area ==
- Nagasaki Ken'ei Bus (Transportation Bureau of Nagasaki Prefecture) Ōmura bus terminal
- Ōmura City Office
- Nagasaki Airport - Change to a bus

== See also ==
- List of railway stations in Japan
