= Saga Station =

Railway station in Saga, Saga Prefecture, Japan

JH 08 Saga Station 佐賀駅
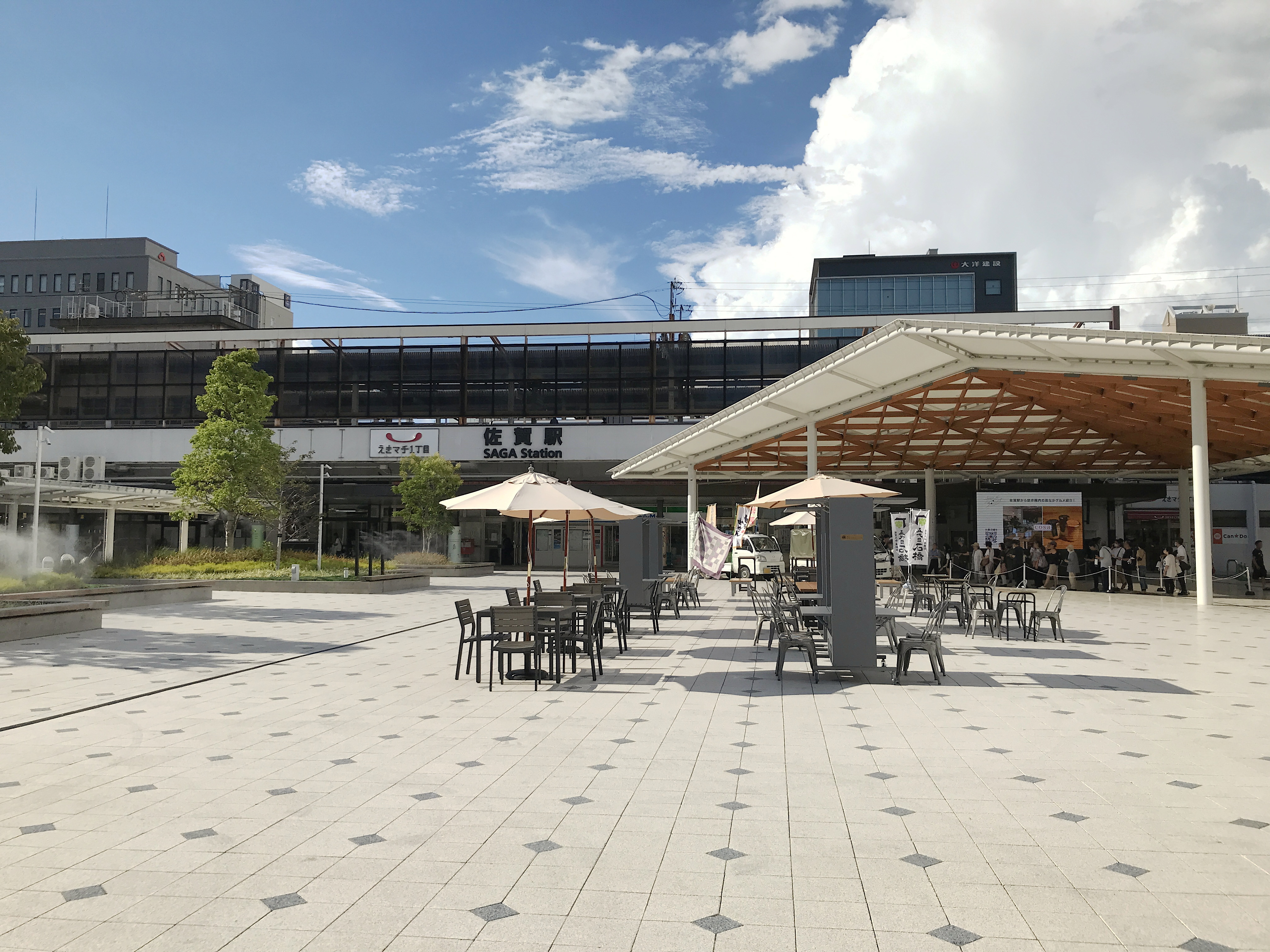
- South side in 2023

General information
- Location: 1-chōme-11 Ekimae Chūō, Saga-shi, Saga-ken 840-0801; Japan
- Coordinates: 33°15′51″N 130°17′51″E
- Operator: JR Kyushu
- Line: JH Nagasaki Main Line
- Distance: 25.0 km from Tosu
- Platforms: 2 island platforms
- Tracks: 4

Construction
- Accessible: Yes

Other information
- Status: Staffed (Midori no Madoguchi)
- Website: Official website

History
- Opened: 20 August 1891

Passengers
- FY2020: 8,546 daily
- Rank: 11th (among JR Kyushu stations)

Services
Preceding station	JR Kyushu	Following station
Nabeshima towards Nagasaki	Nagasaki Line	Igaya JH 07 towards Tosu
Kōhoku towards Takeo-Onsen	Relay Kamome	Shin-Tosu towards Hakata
Kōhoku towards Sasebo or Huis Ten Bosch	Midori and Huis Ten Bosch	Shin-Tosu towards Hakata
Location
- Location within Saga Prefecture Location within Japan

Saga Station (Japanese: 佐賀駅, Hepburn: Saga-eki) is a junction passenger railway station located in the city of Saga, Saga Prefecture, Japan, operated by the Kyushu Railway Company (JR Kyushu).

== Lines ==
The station is served by the Nagasaki Main Line, located 25.0 km from the starting point of the line at Tosu and is a served by trains of the Karatsu Line which continue an additional 6.4 kilometers past the nominal terminal of the line at Kubota.

== Layout ==
Saga Station is an elevated station with two island platforms serving four tracks. The station building and concourse are below the platforms, and the station has a Midori no Madoguchi staffed ticket office/ When viewed from directly above the station, the elevated shape of the station is straight on the north side, while the south side is curved, a vestige of the future plan to build a Shinkansen station and an elevated Shinkansen line along the north side. There is also a cut-in line on the Tosu side of platform 1, a vestige of the time when Saga Line trains used to depart and arrive there, and a part of the Saga Line elevated track remains about 600 meters from Saga Station toward Tosu.

=== Platforms ===
Tracks
1	■Nagasaki Main Line・Sasebo Line	for Hizen-Yamaguchi, Isahaya, and Haiki
1	■Karatsu Line	for Taku and Karatsu
2	■Limited express: Kamome	for Isahaya and Nagasaki
2	■Limited express: Midori, Huis Ten Bosch	for Sasebo and Huis ten Bosch
2	■Nagasaki Main Line・Sasebo Line	for Hizen-Yamaguchi, Isahaya, and Haiki
3	■Nagasaki Main Line	for Kanzaki and Tosu
3	■Karatsu Line	for Taku and Karatsu
4	■Limited Express: Kamome, Midori, Huis Ten Bosch	for Tosu and Hakata
4	■Nagasaki Main Line	for Kanzaki and Tosu

== History ==
The station was opened on 20 August 1891 by the private Kyushu Railway as the western terminus of a line from Tosu. It became a through station on 5 May 1895 when the track was extended west to Yamaguchi (today Hizen-Yamaguchi) and Takeo (today Takeo-Onsen). When the Kyushu Railway was nationalized on 1 July 1907, Japanese Government Railways (JGR) took over control of the station. On 12 October 1909, the station became part of the Nagasaki Main Line. On 25 May 1935, the station also became part of the Saga Line when the track from Yabekawa (today Setaka to Chikugo-Ōgawa was extended north to Saga. The Saga Line was closed on 28 March 1987. A few days later, with the privatization of Japanese National Railways (JNR), the successor of JGR, on 1 April 1987, control of the station passed to JR Kyushu.

== Passenger statistics ==
In fiscal 2020, the station was used by an average of 8,546 passengers daily (boarding passengers only), and it ranked 11th among the busiest stations of JR Kyushu.

== Surrounding area ==
- Saga Station Bus Center

== See also ==
- List of railway stations in Japan
