= Huis Ten Bosch Station =

Railway station in Sasebo, Nagasaki Prefecture, Japan

Huis Ten Bosch Station ハウステンボス駅
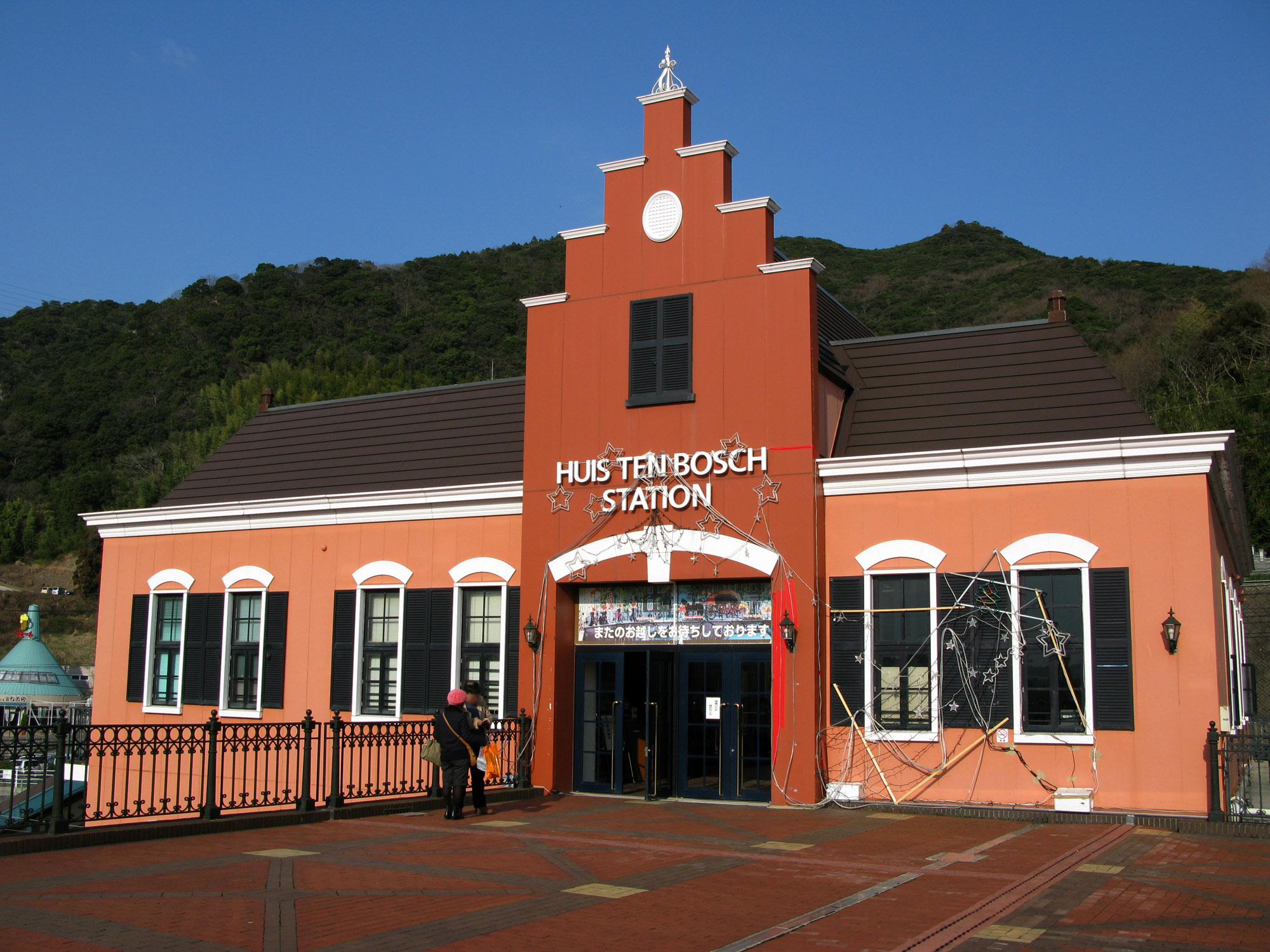
- The west (theme park side) entrance of Huis Ten Bosch Station in February 2009

General information
- Location: Haenosaki-chō, Sasebo-shi, Nagasaki-ken 859-3236; Japan
- Coordinates: 33°05′29.81″N 129°47′47.80″E
- Operator: JR Kyushu
- Line: ■ Ōmura Line
- Distance: 4.7 km from Haiki
- Platforms: 2 side platforms
- Tracks: 2

Construction
- Structure type: At grade
- Accessible: Yes - elevator to platform

Other information
- Status: Staffed ticket window (Midori no Madoguchi) (outsourced)
- Website: Official website

History
- Opened: 10 March 1992

Passengers
- FY2024: 1400 daily
- Rank: 125th (among JR Kyushu stations)

Services
| Preceding station | JR Kyushu | Following station |
|---|---|---|
| Haenosaki towards Isahaya | Ōmura Line Seaside Liner Local | Haiki Terminus |
| Terminus | Huis Ten Bosch | Haiki towards Hakata |
Location
- Location within Nagasaki Prefecture Location within Japan

Huis Ten Bosch Station (ハウステンボス駅, Hausutenbosu-eki) is a passenger railway station located in the city of Sasebo, Nagasaki Prefecture, Japan. It is operated by JR Kyushu. This station serves the Huis Ten Bosch theme park after which it is named.

== Lines ==
The station is served by the Ōmura Line and is located 4.7 km from the starting point of the line at Haiki. Besides the local services on the line, the Rapid Seaside Liner also stops at the station. The station is the terminus for the JR Kyushu Limited Express Huis Ten Bosch from Hakata.

== Station layout ==
The station consists of an island platform serving two tracks. The station building is built of brick in a Dutch style to blend with the theme park and is an elevated structure, built over the platforms and tracks and houses a ticket counter, a waiting area and a shop. A flight of steps and an elevator from the station concourse gives access to the platform below. Platform/track 2 is a through-track and is used by Ōmura Line traffic. Platform/line 1 was also formerly a through-track but has now become a dead-end siding in order to accommodate the installation of an elevator shaft. It is used for trains such as the Huis Ten Bosch limited express which terminates at the station. Of the stations on the Ōmura Line, only the section from Haiki to this station has been electrified to accommodate the Huis Ten Bosch express trains.

Management of the station has been outsourced to the JR Kyushu Tetsudou Eigyou Co., a wholly owned subsidiary of JR Kyushu specialising in station services. It staffs the ticket counter which is equipped with a Midori no Madoguchi facility.

=== Platforms ===
| 1 | ■ Ōmura Line | for Hakata (Express Huis Ten Bosch) |
| 2 | ■ Ōmura Line | for Nagasaki for Sasebo |

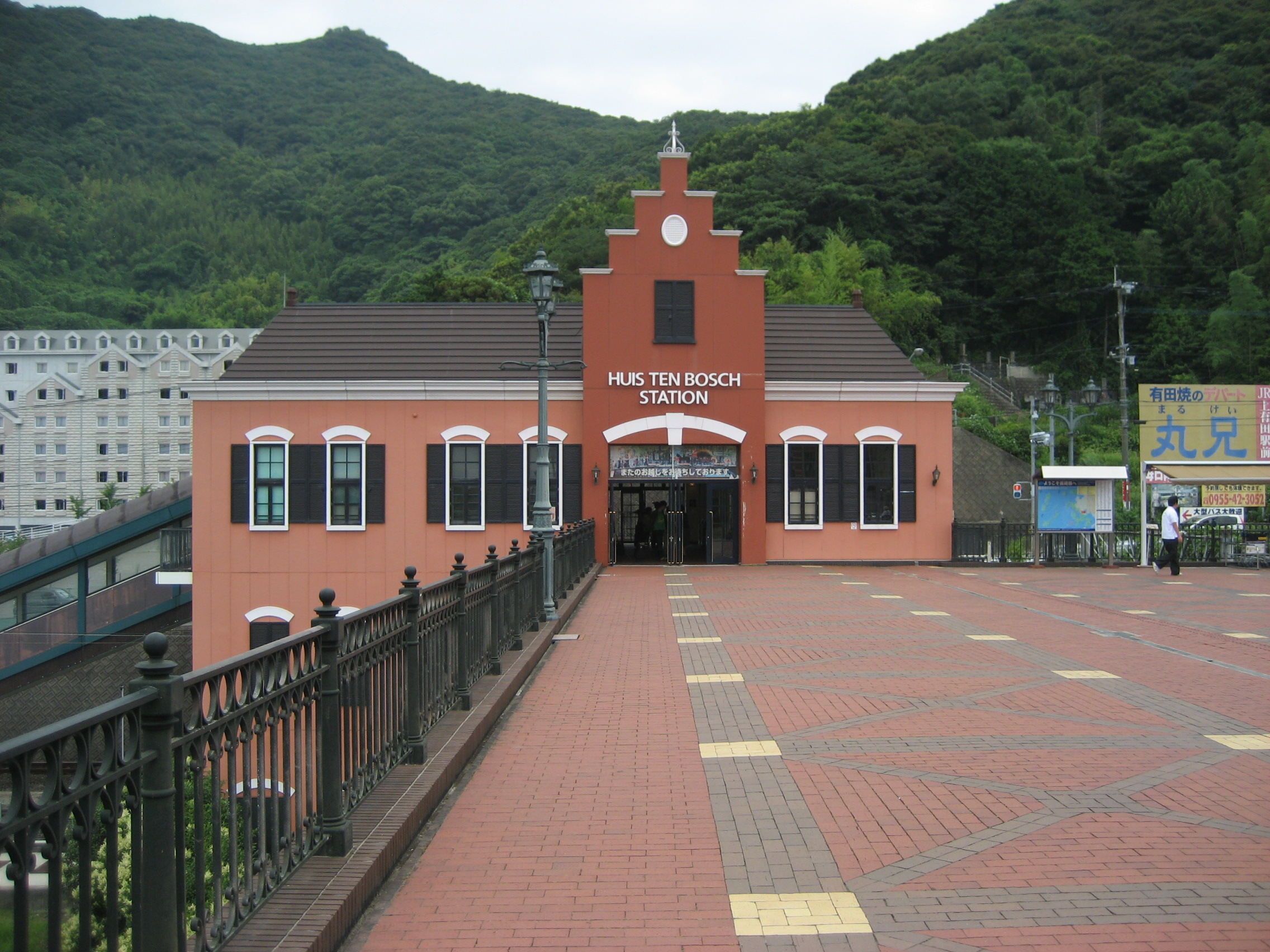
A distant view of the station, approaching it by way of the bridge from the theme park.

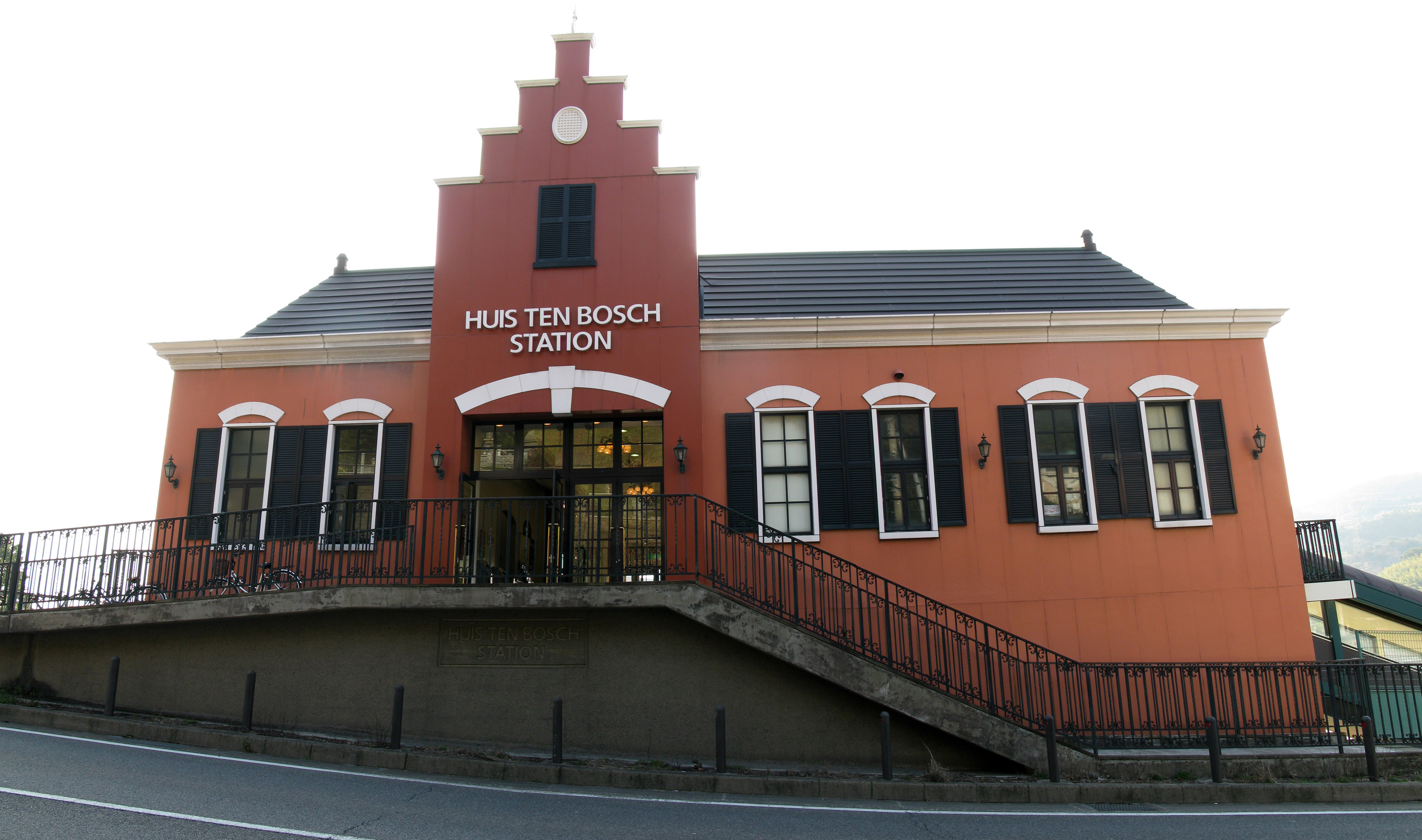
The east entrance of the station. The theme park is on the other side.

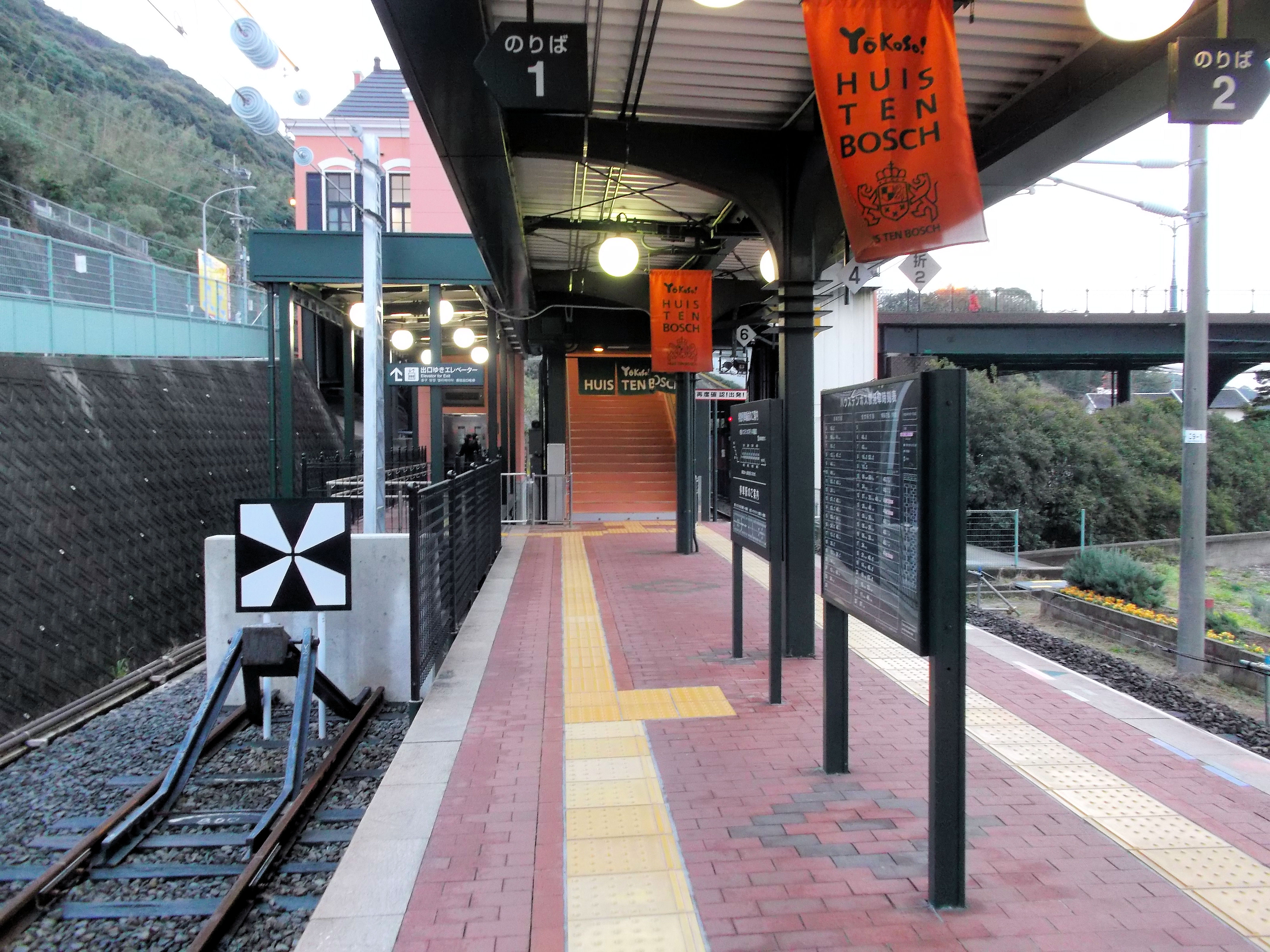
A view of the platforms in 2013. Track 1 is a siding. Note the elevator shaft behind it and the station building above.

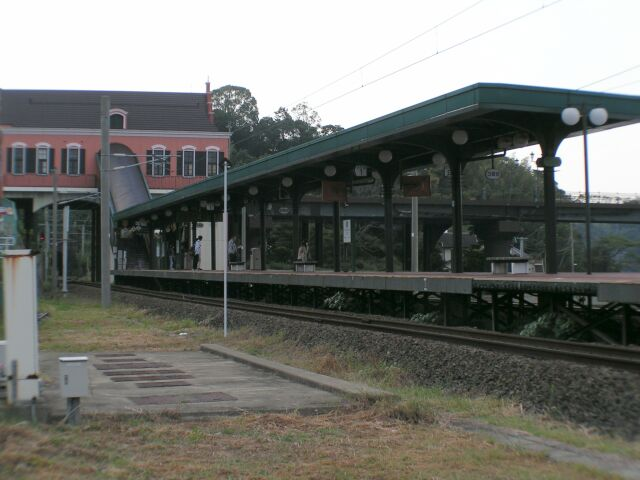
An older view of platform/track 1 in 2005 when it was still a through track and there was no elevator shaft.

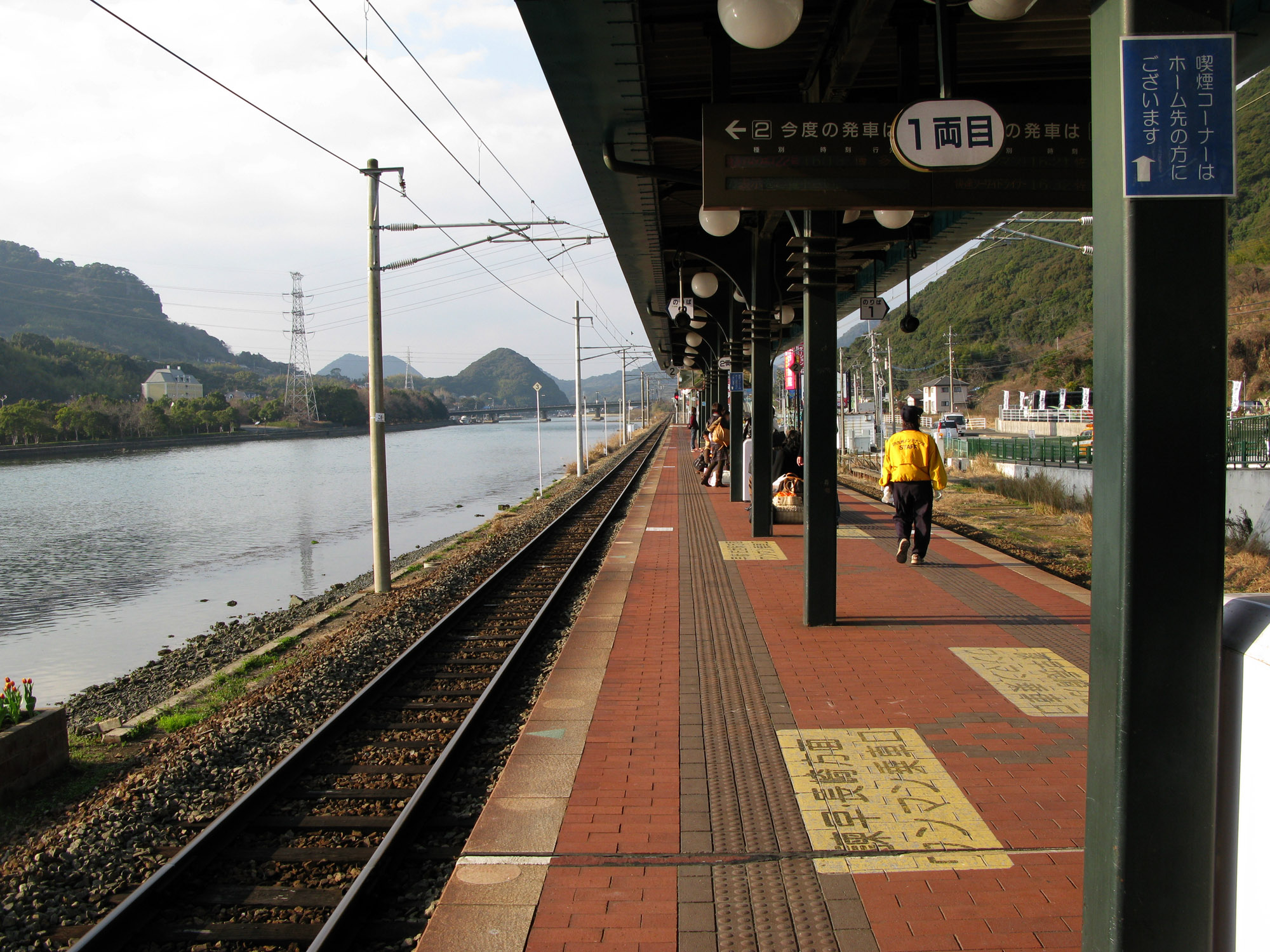
Platform 2 in the direction of Haiki. Note the catenary wires.

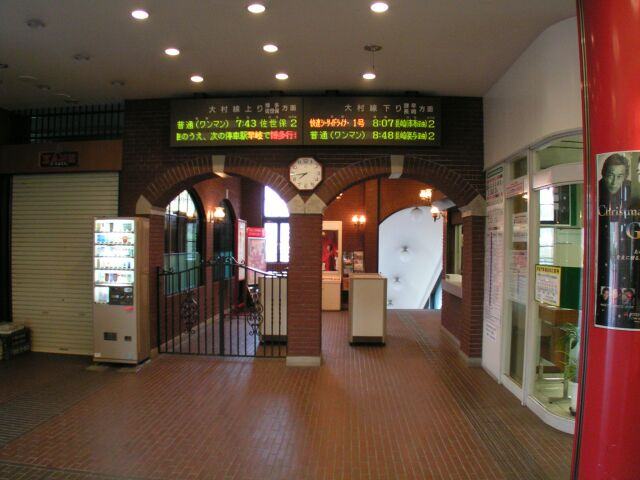
Ticket gate and steps leading down to the platforms.

== History ==
JR Kyushu opened the station on 10 March 1992 shortly before the opening of the theme park.

== Passenger statistics ==
In fiscal 2020, the station was used by an average of 654 passengers daily (boarding passengers only), and it ranked 189th among the busiest stations of JR Kyushu.

== Surrounding area ==
- Huis Ten Bosch (theme park)
- Nagasaki International University
- WINS Sasebo

== See also ==
- List of railway stations in Japan
