= Haiki Station =

Railway station in Sasebo, Nagasaki Prefecture, Japan

Haiki Station 早岐駅
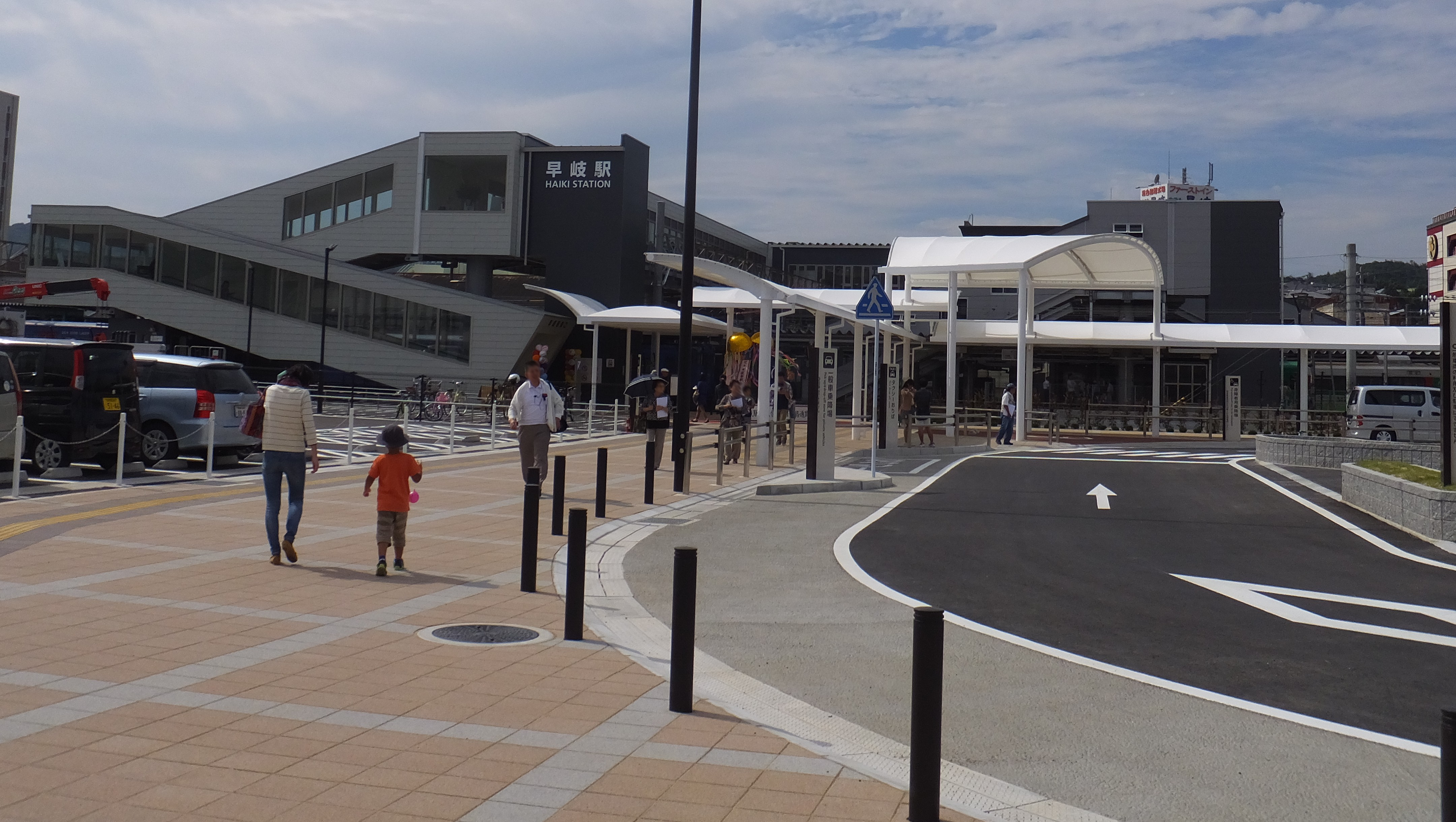
- The east entrance of Haiki Station in October 2014

General information
- Location: 1-chōme Haiki; Sasebo, Nagasaki; Japan
- Coordinates: 33°8′0″N 129°47′57″E
- Operator: JR Kyushu
- Distance: Sasebo Line: 39.9 km (24.8 mi) from Hizen-Yamaguchi
- Platforms: 1 side + 1 island platforms
- Tracks: 4 (1 is a siding) + 1 passing line and multiple sidings

Construction
- Structure type: At grade
- Parking: Available
- Cycle facilities: Designated parking area for bicycles
- Accessible: Yes – elevators to platforms

Other information
- Status: JR Kyushu ticket window (Midori no Madoguchi)
- Website: Official website

History
- Opened: 10 July 1897
- Rebuilt: 2014
- Former names: Takeo (until 19 June 1975)

Passengers
- FY2020: 1,372 daily
- Rank: 106th (among JR Kyushu stations)

Services
Preceding station	JR Kyushu	Following station
Daitō towards Sasebo	Sasebo Line	Mikawachi towards Kōhoku
Huis Ten Bosch towards Isahaya	Ōmura Line Seaside Liner Local	Terminus
Huis Ten Bosch Terminus	Huis Ten Bosch	Arita towards Hakata
Sasebo Terminus	Midori	Arita towards Hakata
Location
- Location within Nagasaki Prefecture Location within Japan

Haiki Station (Japanese: 早岐駅, Hepburn: Haiki-eki) is a junction passenger railway station located in the city of Sasebo, Nagasaki Prefecture, Japan. It is operated by JR Kyushu.

== Lines ==
The station is served by the Sasebo Line and is located 39.9 km from the starting point of the line at Hizen-Yamaguchi. There is no through track. Trains stopping at the station execute a switchback before continuing their journey towards either termini of the line. The station is also the nominal starting point of the Ōmura Line although most of the local trains on the line continue their journey to end at Sasebo using the Sasebo Line tracks. Besides the local services on the Sasebo Line, the following rapid and limited express services also stop at the station:

- Seaside Liner – rapid service from Sasebo to Nagasaki
- Midori – limited express from Hakata to Sasebo)
- Huis Ten Bosch – limited express from Hakata to Huis Ten Bosch

== Station layout ==
The station consists of a side platform and an island platform serving four tracks. Track/platform 1 is a dead-end siding and juts into the other side of platform 2. It is used by trains on the Sasebo Line to perform a switchback to continue their journey after stopping at the station as there is no through-track. Track 3 is a through-track for Sasebo Line towards the Ōmura Line while tracks 4/5 are served by platforms 4 and 5, the island platform. The station building is a hashigami structure where station facilities are located on a bridge spanning the tracks, with entrances on both the east and west side of the tracks. On the bridge structure are located a waiting area, a kiosk, and a staffed ticket window with a Midori no Madoguchi facility. Elevators lead up from the station entrances to the bridge and from the bridge to the platforms. Parking for cars is provided at both the west and east entrances of the station and there is a designated parking area for bicycles.

To the east of the station are multiple sidings and a turntable belonging to the maintenance depot or "driving centre" of the Nagasaki branch of JR Kyushu.

=== Platforms ===
1	■ Sasebo Line	for Sasebo for Arita
2	■ Sasebo Line	for Sasebo
2	■ Ōmura Line	for Huis Ten Bosch, Isahaya and Nagasaki
4, 5	■ Sasebo Line	Sasebo for Arita
4, 5	■ Ōmura Line	for Huis Ten Bosch, Isahaya and Nagasaki

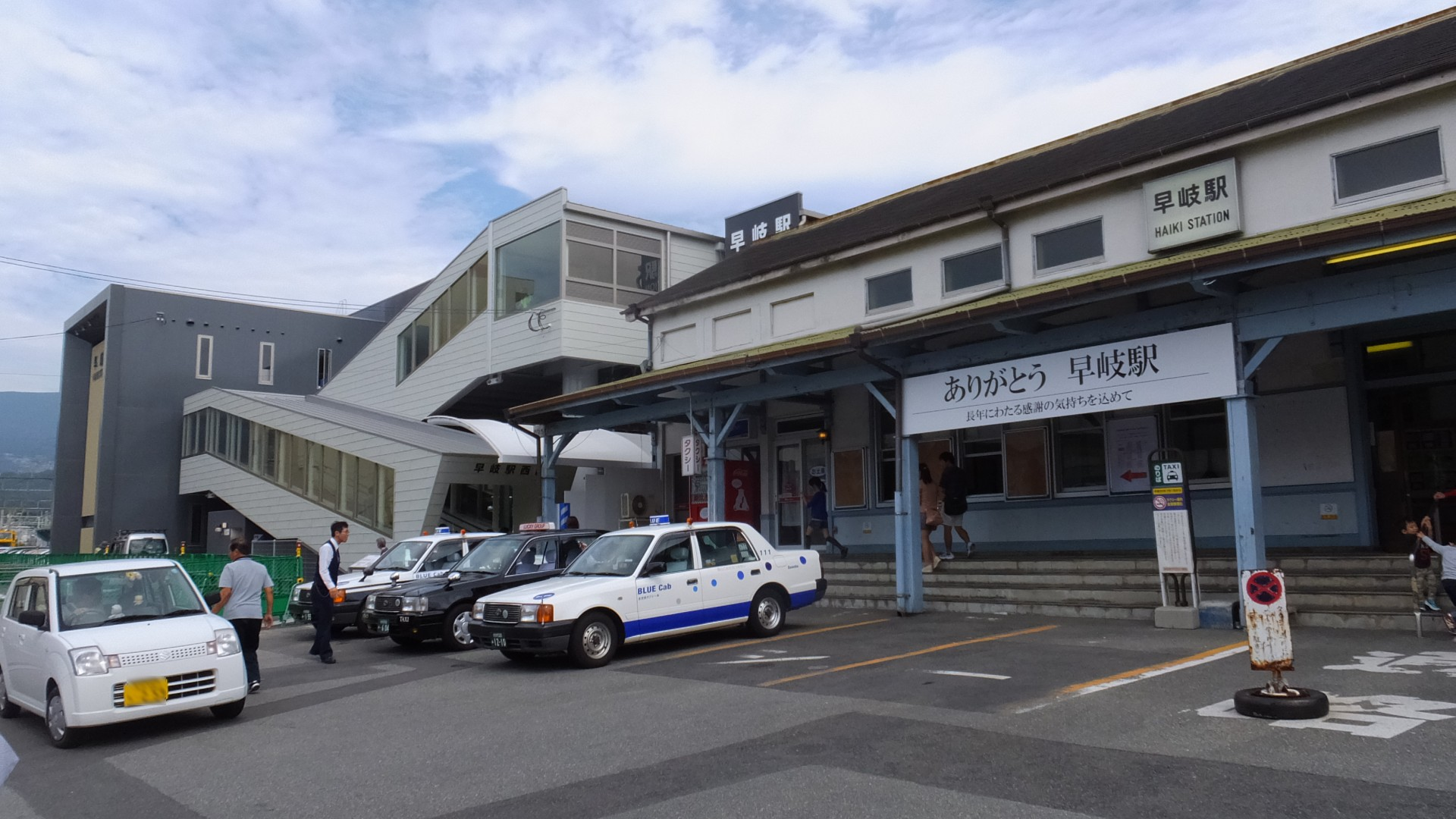
The west entrance of the station in 2014. To the right is the old station building, since demolished. The sign says "Thank You, Haiki Station".

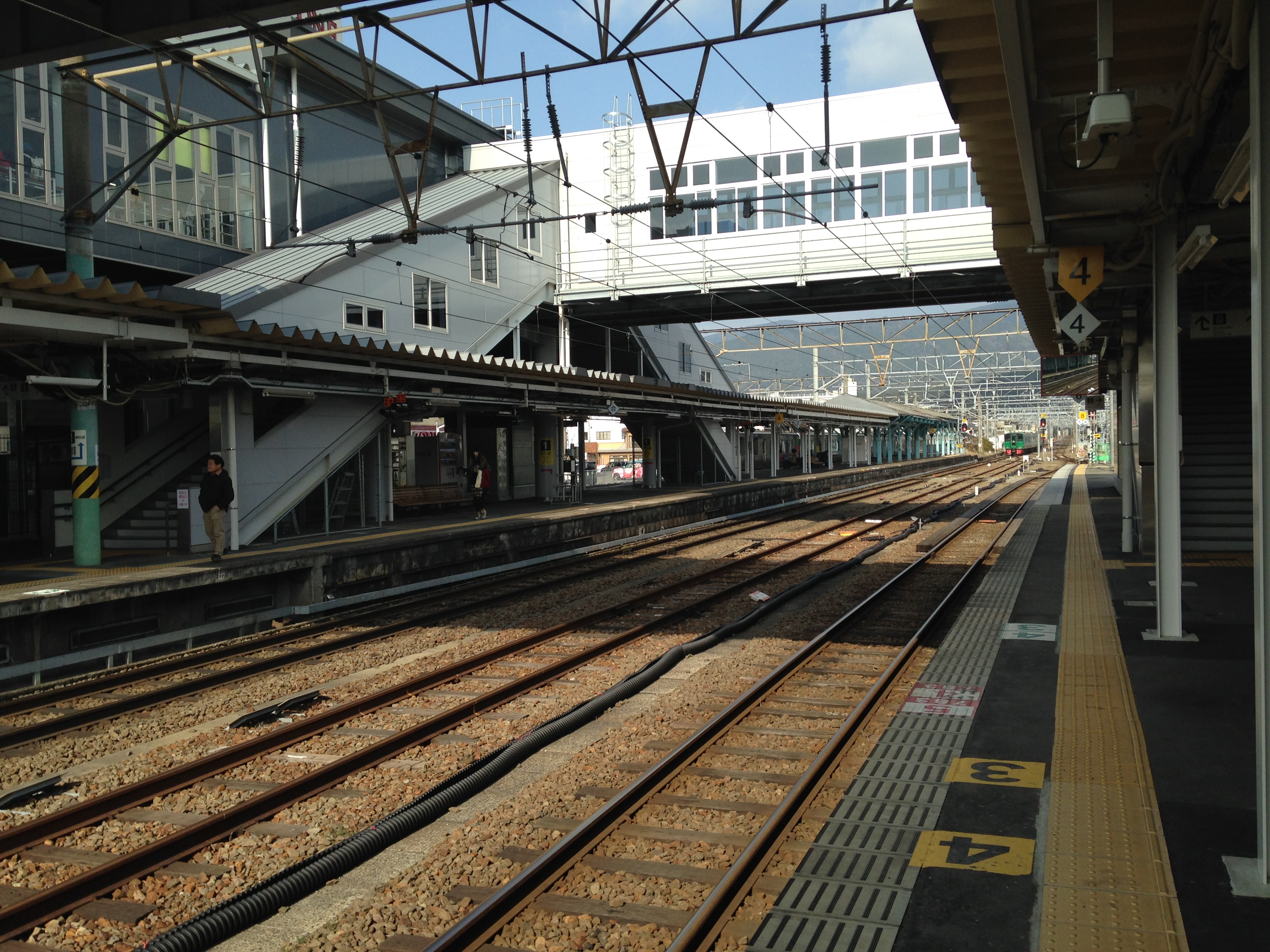
A view of platforms 2 and 4. Track 3 (there is no platform 3) is the through-track in the middle.

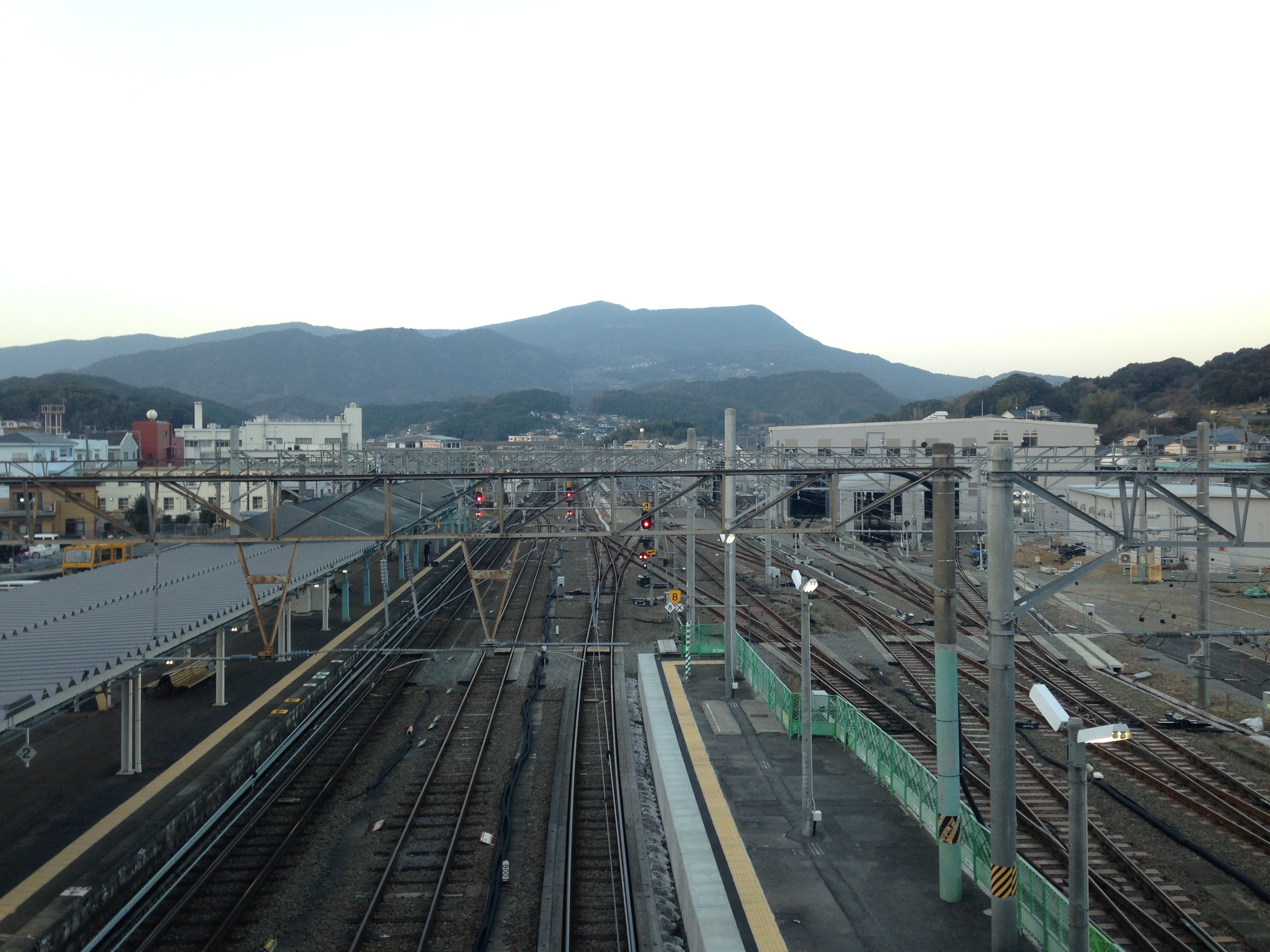
The sidings of the maintenance depot.

== History ==
The private Kyushu Railway had opened a track from Tosu to Saga and Takeo (today Takeo-Onsen) by 5 May 1895. In the next phase of expansion, the track was extended further west with Haiki opening as the new western terminus on 10 July 1897. By 20 January 1898, Haiki became a through-station when the track was extended to Sasebo while another branch had reached Ōmura and then on 27 November that year, Isahaya and by 5 April 1905, Nagasaki. When the Kyushu Railway was nationalized on 1 July 1907, Japanese Government Railways (JGR) took over control of the station. On 12 October 1909, track from Tosu through Haiki to Nagasaki was designated the Nagasaki Main Line while the branch from to Sasebo was designated the Sasebo Line with Haiki as the official starting point. On 1 December 1934, another route was given the designation Nagasaki Main Line and the official starting point of the Sasebo Line was moved to Hizen-Yamaguchi. The track from Haiki to Isahaya was designated the Ōmura Line. With the privatization of Japanese National Railways (JNR), the successor of JGR, on 1 April 1987, control of the station passed to JR Kyushu.

On 11 October 2014, a "hashigami"-format station building was opened, replacing the old station building, a historic timber structure in western style which was built in 1897.

== Passenger statistics ==
In fiscal 2020, the station was used by an average of 1,372 passengers daily (boarding passengers only), and it ranked 106th among the busiest stations of JR Kyushu.

== Surrounding area ==
- Sasebo City Hall Haiki Branch

== See also ==
- List of railway stations in Japan
