= Shin-Ōmura Station =

Railway station in Omura, Nagasaki prefecture, Japan

Shin-Ōmura Station 新大村駅
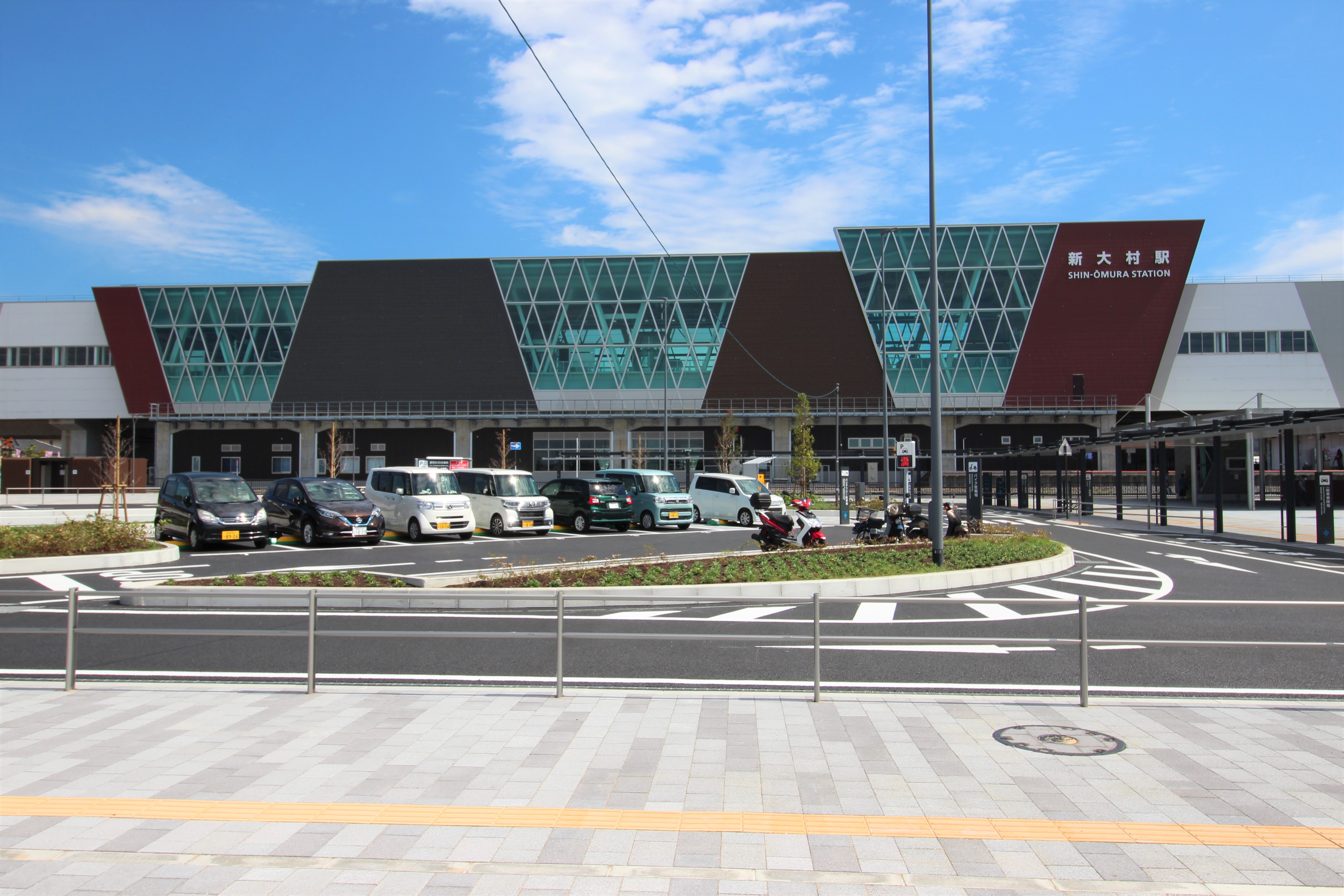
- Shin-Ōmura Station in September 2022

General information
- Location: 3 Chome Uematsu, Ōmura, Nagasaki; Japan
- Coordinates: 32°55′58″N 129°57′25″E
- Operator: JR Kyushu
- Lines: Nishi Kyushu Shinkansen; Ōmura Line
- Distance: Nishi Kyushu Shinkansen: 33.8 km (21.0 mi) from Nagasaki; Ōmura Line: 33.7 km (20.9 mi) from Haiki
- Platforms: 3 side platforms
- Tracks: 3

Construction
- Structure type: Nishi Kyushu Shinkansen: Elevated; Ōmura Line: At-grade

Other information
- Status: Staffed (Midori no Madoguchi)

History
- Opened: 23 September 2022

Services
Preceding station	JR Kyushu	Following station
Isahaya towards Nagasaki	Nishi Kyushu Shinkansen Kamome	Ureshino-Onsen towards Takeo-Onsen
Suwa towards Isahaya	Ōmura Line	Takematsu towards Haiki
Location
- Location within Nagasaki Prefecture Location within Japan

Shin-Ōmura Station (Japanese: 新大村駅, Hepburn: Shin-Ōmura-eki; lit. 'New Ōmura Station') is a passenger railway station located in the city of Ōmura, Nagasaki, Japan. It is operated by the Kyushu Railway Company (JR Kyushu).

== Lines ==
Shin-Ōmura Station is served by the Nishi Kyushu Shinkansen and is 32.3 kilometers from the official starting point of the line at Takeo-Onsen. It is also served by the conventional services of the Ōmura Line and is 33.7 kilometers from the terminus of that line at Haiki .

== Layout ==
The station consists of one ground-level side platform for the Ōmura Line and two elevated side platforms for the Nishi Kyushu Shinkansen. The station has a Midori no Madoguchi staffed ticket office.

=== Platforms ===
1	■ Ōmura Line	for Huis ten Bosch and Sasebo for Isahaya and Nagasaki
11	■ Nishi Kyushu Shinkansen	for Takeo-Onsen and Hakata
12	■ Nishi Kyushu Shinkansen	for Nagasaki

== History ==
Shin-Ōmura Station opened on 23 September 2022 when the Nishi Kyushu Shinkansen began revenue service.

== Surrounding area ==
- Omura Municipal Hospital
- Nagasaki Prefectural Driver's License Examination Center
- Ground Self-Defense Force Omura Garrison, Takematsu Garrison
- Maritime Self-Defense Force Omura Air Base

== See also ==
- List of railway stations in Japan
