= Ureshino-Onsen Station =

Railway station in Ureshino, Saga Prefecture, Japan

Ureshino-Onsen Station 嬉野温泉駅
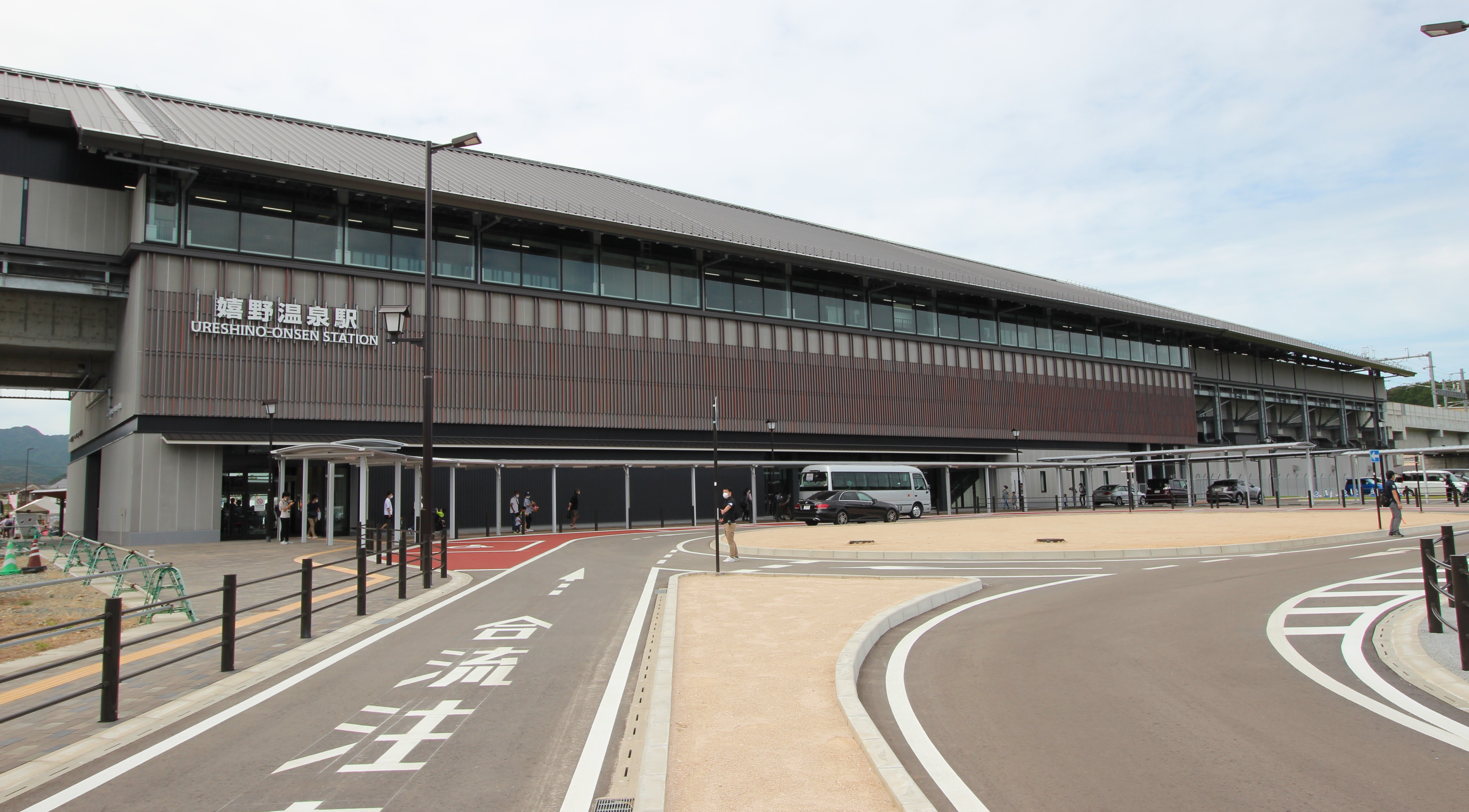
- The east entrance of Ureshino-Onsen Station

General information
- Location: Ureshino, Saga; Japan
- Coordinates: 33°06′24″N 130°00′00″E
- Operator: JR Kyushu
- Line: Nishi Kyushu Shinkansen
- Distance: 55.1 km (34.2 mi) from Nagasaki
- Platforms: 2 side platforms
- Tracks: 2

Construction
- Structure type: Elevated

Other information
- Website: Official website

History
- Opened: 23 September 2022; 3 years ago

Services
Preceding station	JR Kyushu	Following station
Shin-Ōmura towards Nagasaki	Nishi Kyushu Shinkansen Kamome	Takeo-Onsen Terminus
Location
- Location within Saga Prefecture Location within Japan

Ureshino-Onsen Station (Japanese: 嬉野温泉駅, Hepburn: Ureshino-Onsen-eki) is a railway station built in Ureshino, Saga, Japan, by the Kyushu Railway Company (JR Kyushu).

== Lines ==
Ureshino-Onsen Station is served by the Nishi Kyushu Shinkansen. As it is not a major station on the line, roughly half of all trains pass through this station without stopping.

=== Platforms ===
The station is composed of two side platforms serving two tracks. Eastbound trains for Takeo-Onsen stop at platform 11, while westbound trains for Nagasaki stop at platform 12.

== History ==
Ureshino-Onsen Station opened on 23 September 2022 when the Nishi Kyushu Shinkansen began revenue service.
