= Nishi Kyushu Shinkansen =

High-speed railway line in Japan

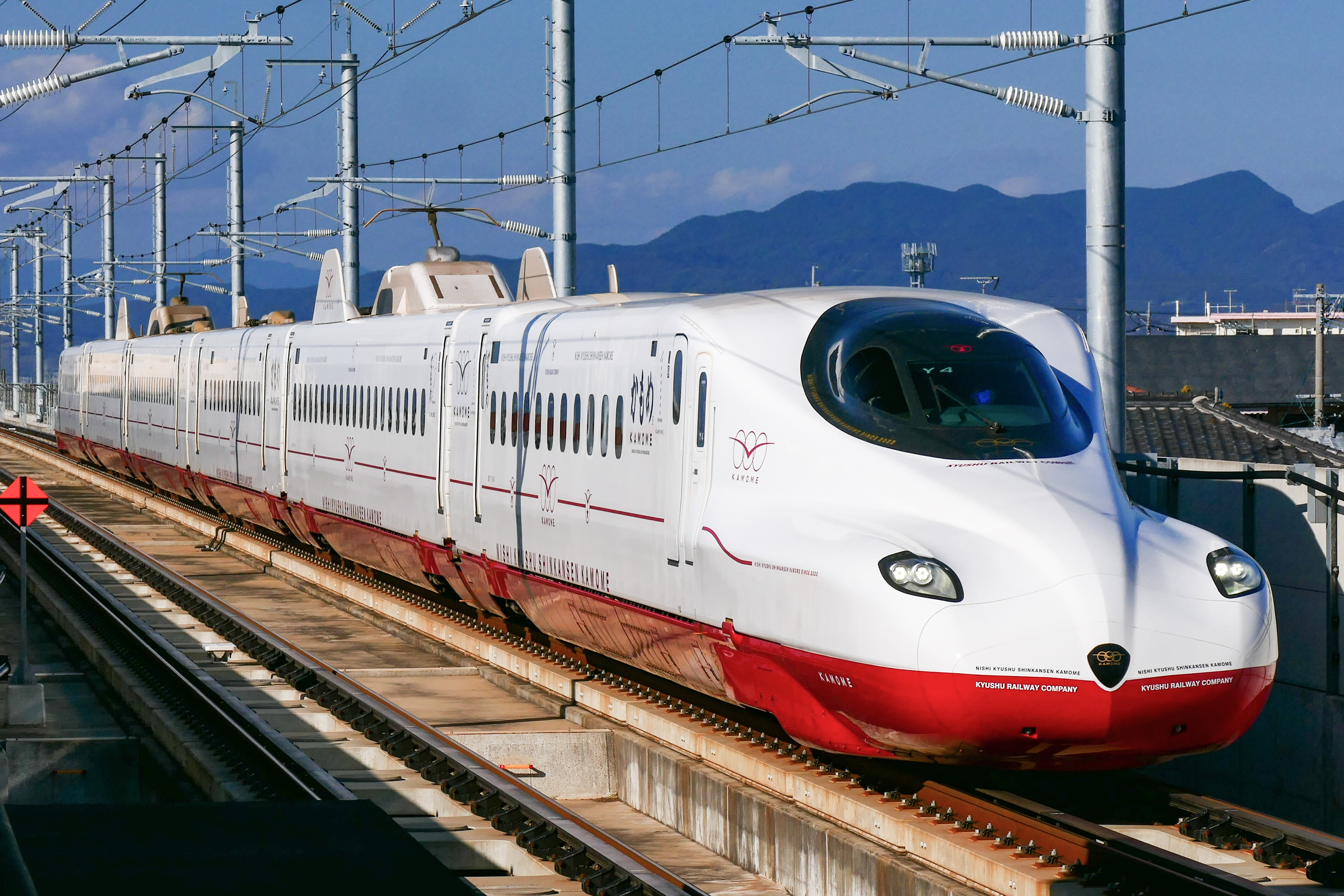
- N700S series near Shin-Omura Station

Overview
- Native name: 西九州新幹線
- Owner: Japan Railway Construction, Transport and Technology Agency (JRTT)
- Locale: Kyushu (Saga and Nagasaki Prefectures)
- Termini: Takeo-Onsen; Nagasaki
- Stations: 5

Service
- Type: High-speed rail
- System: Shinkansen
- Services: Kamome
- Operator: JR Kyushu
- Depot: Omura
- Rolling stock: N700S

History
- Opened: 23 September 2022; 3 years ago

Technical
- Line length: 66 km (41 mi)
- Track gauge: 1,435 mm (4 ft 8 1/2 in) standard gauge
- Minimum radius: 4,000 m (2.5 mi; 13,000 ft)
- Electrification: Overhead line, 25 kV 60 Hz AC
- Operating speed: 260 km/h (162 mph)
- Signalling: Cab signalling
- Train protection system: KS-ATC
- Maximum incline: 3.0%
Route map

The Nishi Kyushu Shinkansen (Japanese: 西九州新幹線, Hepburn: Nishi Kyūshū Shinkansen; lit. 'West Kyushu Shinkansen') is a Japanese high-speed rail line and part of the nationwide Shinkansen network. Located in the northwestern part of the island of Kyushu, it is operated by the Kyushu Railway Company (JR Kyushu) and is informally known as the Nagasaki Shinkansen. The 66-kilometre (41 mi) section between Nagasaki and Takeo-Onsen opened on 23 September 2022 and is the shortest Shinkansen line in Japan.

The line is envisioned to ultimately connect Nagasaki and Hakata, linking with both the Kyushu and San'yō Shinkansen lines. However, as of 2025, the route for the section east of Takeo-Onsen toward Hakata via Saga has not been finalized, and construction has not begun.

Until any extension opens, the Relay Kamome limited express operates between Hakata and Takeo-Onsen, providing a cross-platform connection to the Nishi Kyushu Shinkansen. Despite only part of the line being completed, the initial section has reduced travel times between Hakata and Nagasaki from about two hours to roughly 90 minutes.

== History ==
=== Initial route selection ===
Plans for a Shinkansen between Fukuoka and Nagasaki was first laid out in 1971 by the Ministry of Transport. The construction of the route was decided in the 1973 basic plan. At the time the route was decreed to pass through Saga, split from the main Kyushu Shinkansen route in Tsukushi Plain, and share the route with the Kyushu Shinkansen to Fukuoka. In 1985 Japanese National Railways published a map of the line that ran via Haiki in Sasebo.

In 1992, JR Kyushu published a report on the revenue of the route on the premise that it would be built with Shinkansen-level facilities but with track gauge in narrow gauge (Super Tokkyū) instead of the standard gauge normally used in Shinkansen routes. In 2002, the Japan Railway Construction, Transport and Technology Agency (JRTT) applied for permission to build the line between Takeo-Onsen and Nagasaki in Super Tokkyū standard.

=== Start of construction ===
On 16 December 2007, JR Kyushu reached an agreement with Saga and Nagasaki Prefectures that operation of the conventional narrow gauge trains between Hizen-Yamaguchi and Isahaya by JR Kyushu will be continued for 20 years after the opening of the Shinkansen. JRTT applied for permission to build the 45.7 km-long (28.4 mi) segment between Takeo-Onsen and Isahaya on 19 March 2008, and was granted on 26 March. Construction of the segment began on 28 April 2008.

Debate over the final section between Isahaya and Nagasaki continued for several years, before construction was approved by the government. On 26 December 2012 the Japanese government issued a policy that the under-construction segment between Takeo-Onsen and Isahaya, and the segment yet to break ground between Isahaya and Nagasaki shall be built together as a variable gauge system. Permission to build the line between Takeo-Onsen and Nagasaki as a standard gauge Shinkansen was applied on 12 June 2012, and was granted on 29 June.

The initial 66-kilometre (41 mi) section between Takeo-Onsen and Nagasaki opened on 23 September 2022.

=== Abandonment of Gauge Change Trains and reconsideration of route ===
The initial plan involved using the existing narrow gauge track from Shin-Tosu to Takeo-Onsen as well as duplicating the 13.7 km (8.5 mi) Hizen Yamaguchi to Takeo-Onsen section, and building a new Shinkansen line from Takeo-Onsen to Nagasaki.

It was proposed that Gauge Change Train (GCT) trainsets be used, with the technical challenge of the gauge-change being between narrow gauge and standard gauge, whereas previous European experience was between standard gauge and broad gauge. This required brakes, traction motors & gauge-change equipment to fit in a smaller space between the narrow gauge wheels, something which had not previously been achieved on narrow gauge trains with motored axles - as shown in Variable gauge → Features. (Shinkansen trains have motors on axles in every car)

However, technical issues resulted in the cancellation of the GCT, requiring the consideration of other options. Issues encountered included excessive swaying at high speeds, defective oil seals and excessive axle wear (resulting in predicted maintenance costs of 2.5 times that of other Shinkansen trains).

The GCT was expected to allow travel times of around 1 hour 20 minutes between Hakata to Nagasaki, versus the 1 hour 50 minutes currently operated by the 885 series. If the entire route was constructed to Shinkansen standards, the travel time would be 51 minutes.

The current plan is to continue using the existing narrow gauge track with a cross platform interchange at Takeo-Onsen Station until the finalization of the remaining section to Shin-Tosu. In addition, the initial plan of duplicating 13.7 km (8.5 mi) of the section between Takeo-Onsen to Hizen-Yamaguchi has been reduced to 6.3 km (3.9 mi) between Ōmachi to Takahashi.

Saga Prefecture, through which the line was planned to pass with a stop at Saga Station, has refused to allow the construction of the full line to Shin-Tosu. The reasons stated by Saga's prefectural governor are the lack of advantages gained by the prefecture compared to the price of building and maintaining the full Shinkansen line. Saga Prefecture estimates that their burden would be over 240 billion yen, much higher than that of Nagasaki Prefecture's estimated burden of 100 billion yen. In addition, the travel time from Saga to Hakata would only be shortened by around 15 minutes. There is also the issue of the status of the conventional Nagasaki Main Line after the construction of the West Kyushu route. Saga Prefecture would prefer that JR Kyushu continue to operate the line as opposed to transferring them over to a third-sector company, as commonly practiced around the country after the construction of a Shinkansen line.

Following the decision not to use GCTs, Nagasaki Prefecture pushed for the remaining segment to be built in Shinkansen standard on the premise that it offers better convenience and shorter travel time, while Saga Prefecture opposes building in Shinkansen standard as it will need to pay a significant part of the budget despite there being no substantial change in travel time compared to preexisting services. A decision on whether to build the remaining segment in Shinkansen standard, or a Mini-shinkansen with standard gauge tracks but slower speed, was to be made in the summer of 2018, but due to financial concerns from Saga Prefecture it was postponed. On 5 August 2019 a committee in the governing party decided that the segment should be built in Shinkansen standard. Saga Prefecture expressed strong opposition to this, and opined that all possible options (Super Tokkyū, Gauge Change Train, relay train method, Mini-shinkansen and full Shinkansen standard) should be evaluated thoroughly. On 28 October 2019 Saga Prefecture and the Ministry of Land, Infrastructure, Transport and Tourism agreed that the two sides should continue holding discussions on this matter. In 2021 Saga Prefecture proposed to the government that the full line be built either north along the Nagasaki Expressway, or south connecting to Chikugo-Funagoya Station via Saga Airport.

As of September 2022, the opening of the segment between Takeo-Onsen and Hakata remains unknown as no constructions have been approved or initiated. Debates on how the segment will be operated are still ongoing.

On 17 July 2026, the central and Saga prefectural governments agreed to conduct an environmental assessment for the Shin-Tosu to Takeo-Onsen section.

== Services ==
Services are operated by 6-car N700S series trains, at a maximum speed of 260 kilometres per hour (160 mph). There is only one service type, named Kamome. Trains operate approximately once per hour during the day, and twice per hour during the afternoon and early evening. Some trains do not stop at Ureshino-Onsen and/or Shin-Omura.

=== Relay Kamome ===
At Takeo-Onsen each Kamome Shinkansen connects to a limited express train to Hakata, which is named Relay Kamome. The transfer is timed for 3 minutes and is a cross-platform connection to allow easy and timely transfer between trains. Staff are present to ensure all passengers are able to change trains, and the connecting train will wait if the first train arrives late. Some Relay Kamome services are provided by a Midori train (to/from Sasebo) - these trains are shown as Midori (Relay Kamome) in timetables, departure screens, etc.

== Infrastructure ==
The 66-kilometre (41 mi) line, as of 2022, has 168 bridges and 61 tunnels, which is roughly 70% of the entire line. The actual length of the constructed line is a kilometer longer, but is not used by commercial services.

=== Stations ===
Legend:

| ● | All trains stop |
| ▲ | Some trains stop |

| Station | Japanese name | Distance from Takeo-Onsen | Kamome | Transfers | Location | |
|---|---|---|---|---|---|---|
| Takeo-Onsen | 武雄温泉 | 0 | ● | Relay Kamome; Sasebo Line | Takeo | Saga |
| Ureshino-Onsen | 嬉野温泉 | 10.9 km (6.8 mi) | ▲ | | Ureshino | Saga |
| Shin-Ōmura | 新大村 | 32.2 km (20.0 mi) | ▲ | Ōmura Line | Ōmura | Nagasaki |
| Isahaya | 諫早 | 44.8 km (27.8 mi) | ● | Nagasaki Line; Ōmura Line; Shimabara Railway Line | Isahaya | Nagasaki |
| Nagasaki | 長崎 | 66.0 km (41.0 mi) | ● | Nagasaki Line; Ōmura Line; Nagasaki Electric Tramway (Nagasaki-Ekimae) | Nagasaki | Nagasaki |

=== Rolling stock ===
With the start of service in September 2022, trains on the Nishi Kyushu Shinkansen were operated by a fleet of four 6-car N700S series trainsets. Two trainsets are typically required during the day, with three in operation in the afternoon and evening. The remaining set was kept in the depot as a spare. In August 2023, an additional 6-car set was delivered to allow one train to be taken out of service for regular inspections.

Each trainset can accommodate up to 396 passengers. Cars 1–3 (at the Nagasaki end) are reserved seating cars with a total of 163 seats in a 2+2 configuration, while Cars 4–6 are non-reserved cars with a total of 233 seats in a 3+2 configuration. There is no Green Class (first class) seating.

Connecting Relay Kamome trains do include Green Class seats and have different allocations of reserved and non-reserved seats compared with the N700S series sets. As a result, passengers traveling between Hakata and Nagasaki may need to sit in different seating classes on each train. Reserved seats on the N700S series are frequently sold out, although the trains have a substantial number of non-reserved seats available for use.
