= Kamome (train) =

Japanese Shinkansen/limited express train service

Kamome/Relay Kamome
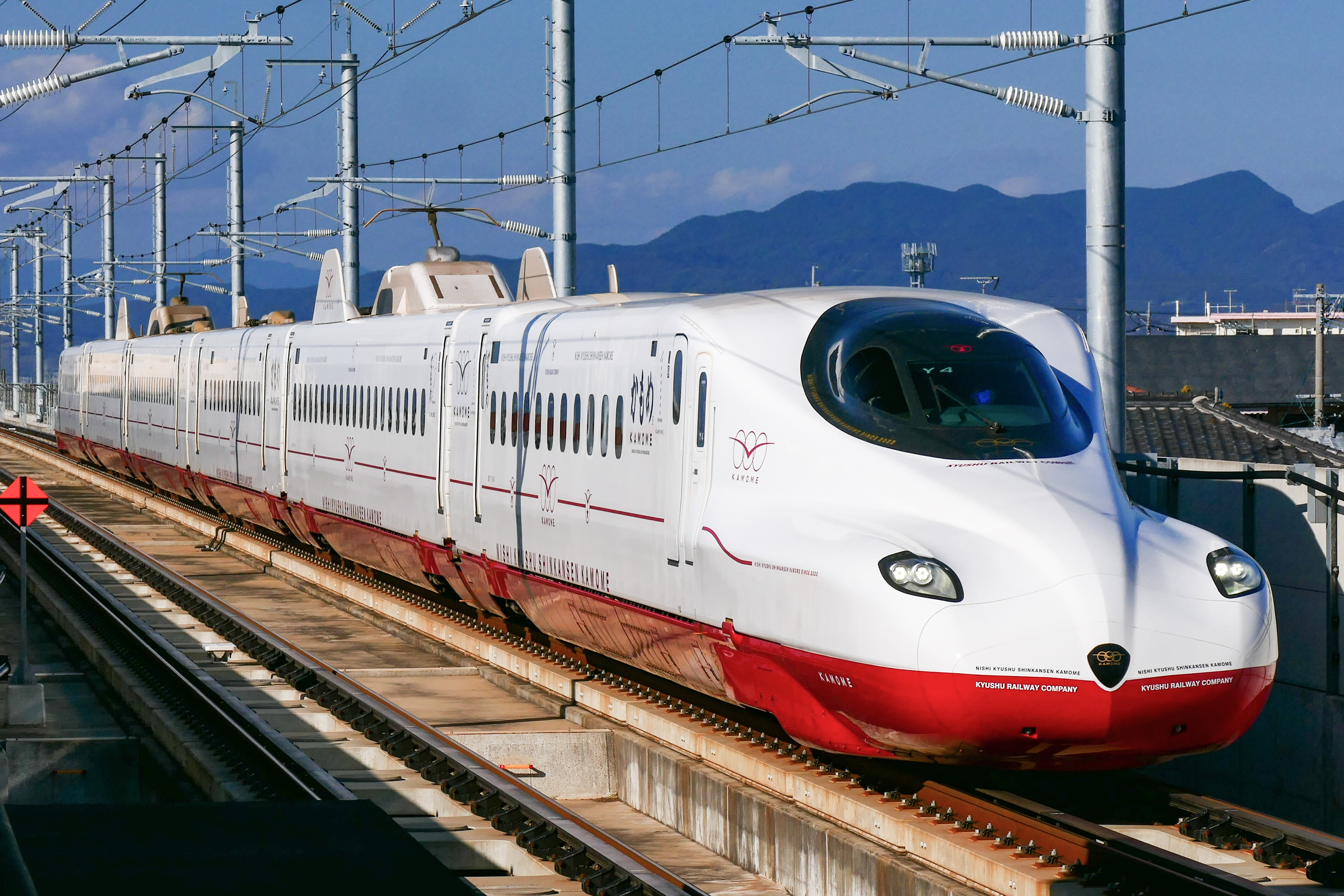
- N700S-8000 series set operating a Kamome service entering Shin-Omura Station, January 2023

Overview
- Service type: Kamome: Shinkansen (Local); Relay Kamome: Limited express
- First service: 1937, 2022 (Shinkansen)
- Current operator: JR Kyushu

Route
- Termini: Hakata; Nagasaki
- Lines used: Kamome: Nishi Kyushu Shinkansen; Relay Kamome: Kagoshima, Nagasaki, Sasebo

Technical
- Rolling stock: Kamome: N700S-8000 series; Relay Kamome: 787 and 885 series
- Operating speed: Kamome: 260 km/h (162 mph); Relay Kamome: 130 km/h (81 mph)

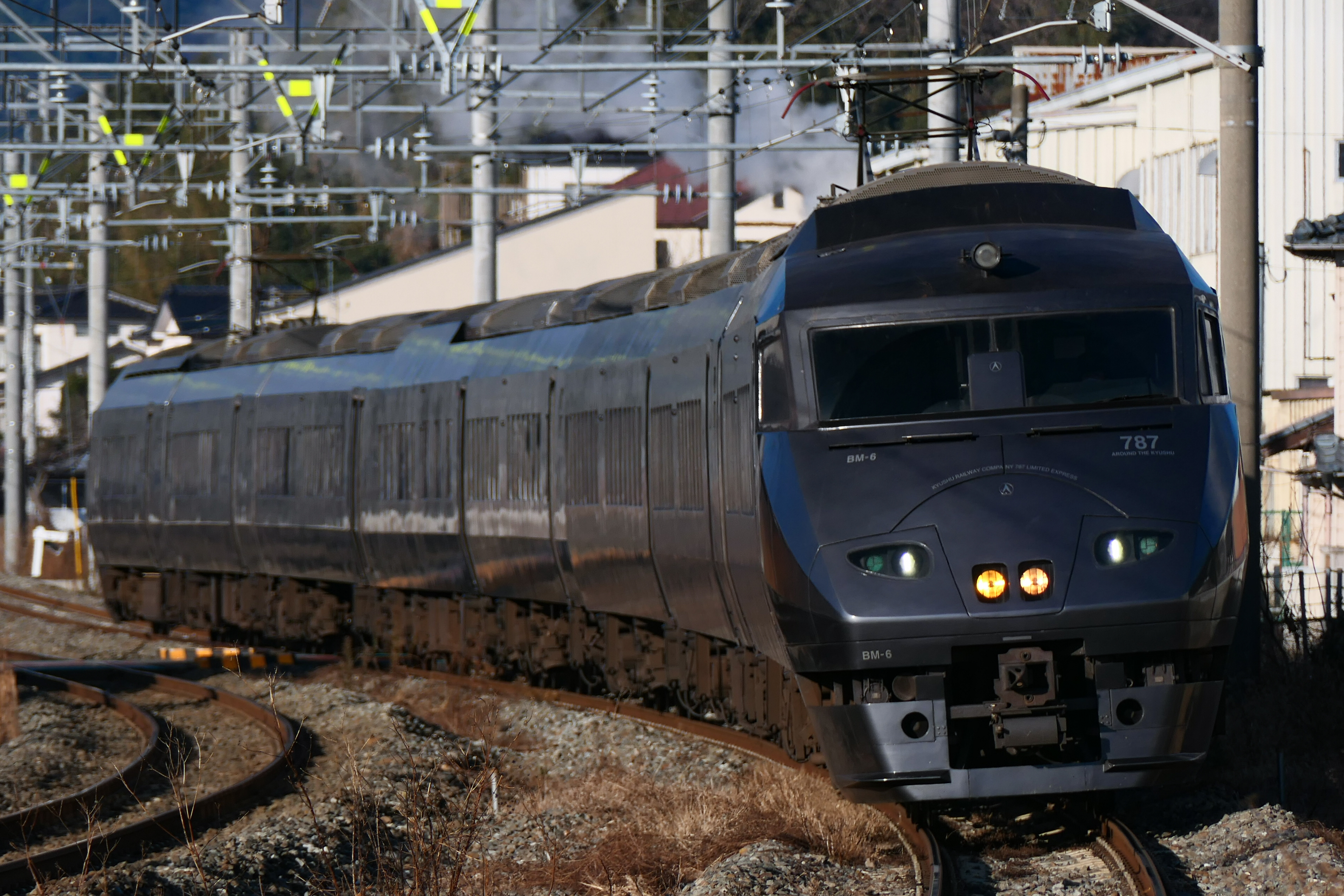
787 series Relay Kamome

Kamome (Japanese: かもめ; lit. 'seagull') is a high-speed Shinkansen service operated on the Nishi Kyushu Shinkansen by the Kyushu Railway Company (JR Kyushu) in Japan. It runs between Nagasaki and Takeo-Onsen, where it connects with the Relay Kamome service, which continues between Takeo-Onsen and Hakata via the Kagoshima, Nagasaki and Sasebo lines.

Prior to 23 September 2022, Kamome trains operated the full route between Nagasaki and Hakata. On that date, the name was transferred to the new Nishi Kyushu Shinkansen service, and the remaining limited express services between Takeo-Onsen and Hakata were renamed Relay Kamome.

== History ==
The Kamome name (written as 鷗) was first used from 1 July 1937 on limited express services operating between Tokyo and Kōbe. These services operated until February 1943.

The Kamome name (now written as かもめ) was revived on 15 March 1953 for limited express services operating between Kyoto and Hakata. This iteration was discontinued in March 1975 following the completion of the San'yō Shinkansen extension to Hakata.

On 1 July 1976, following the electrification of the Nagasaki Main Line, Kamome services resumed—initially between Kokura and Nagasaki, and later between Hakata and Nagasaki—using 485 series EMUs.

The service in its current form began on 23 September 2022 with the opening of the Nishi Kyushu Shinkansen section between Takeo-Onsen and Nagasaki. With the Shinkansen becoming the primary route to Nagasaki, the Kamome name was reassigned to services operating on the newly constructed Shinkansen line.

=== Nishi Kyushu Shinkansen ===
On 28 October 2020, JR Kyushu announced that a six-car version of the N700S series would be used on the isolated Shinkansen section serving Nagasaki, officially named the Nishi Kyushu Shinkansen. Services would feature a cross-platform interchange at Takeo-Onsen with a connecting limited express service branded as Relay Kamome, providing onward connections to Hakata.

JR Kyushu also confirmed that the Kamome name, in continuous use since 1961, would be retained for the Nishi Kyushu Shinkansen services. Most Kamome Shinkansen services stop at all stations between Takeo-Onsen and Nagasaki, although some services pass through Ureshino-Onsen, and a limited number stop only at Isahaya. Between Takeo-Onsen and Hakata, the limited express Relay Kamome continues to operate as a non-Shinkansen service and is expected to do so until the Shinkansen is extended to Hakata. Some Midori services also operate in conjunction with Relay Kamome, branded as "Midori (Relay Kamome)".

== Rolling stock ==
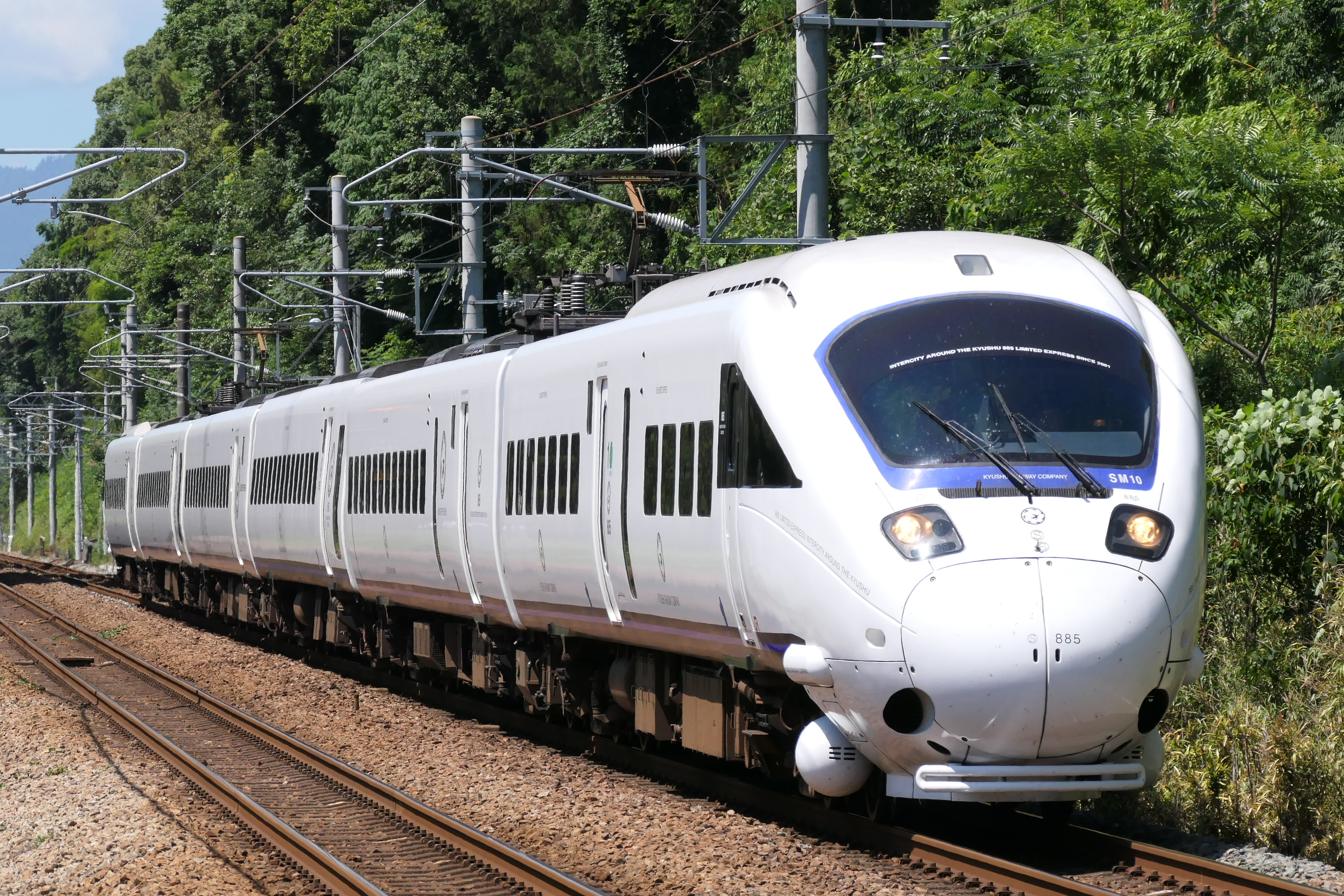
885 series train on a Relay Kamome service

=== Current rolling stock ===
==== Relay Kamome ====
- 783 series EMUs (sometimes used when Relay Kamome is combined with a Midori service)
- 787 series EMUs (since 1992)
- 885 series tilting EMUs (since 2000)

==== Kamome ====
- N700S-8000 series (since 2022)

=== Former rolling stock ===
- 485 series EMUs (1976–2000)

== Station stops ==
Service column legend:

●	All trains stop
▲	Some trains stop
|	All trains pass

Station	Distance from Takeo-Onsen km (mi)	Relay Kamome	Kamome
Hakata	67.3 (41.8)	●	
Futsukaichi	53.1 (33.0)	▲	
Tosu	38.7 (24.0)	●	
Shin-Tosu	35.8 (22.2)	●	
Saga	25.0 (15.5)	●	
Kōhoku	13.7 (8.5)	●	
Takeo-Onsen	0 (0)	●	●
Ureshino-Onsen	10.9 (6.8)		▲
Shin-Ōmura	32.2 (20.0)		▲
Isahaya	44.8 (27.8)		●
Nagasaki	66.0 (41.0)		●
