= N700S Series Shinkansen =

Japanese high speed train type

N700S series
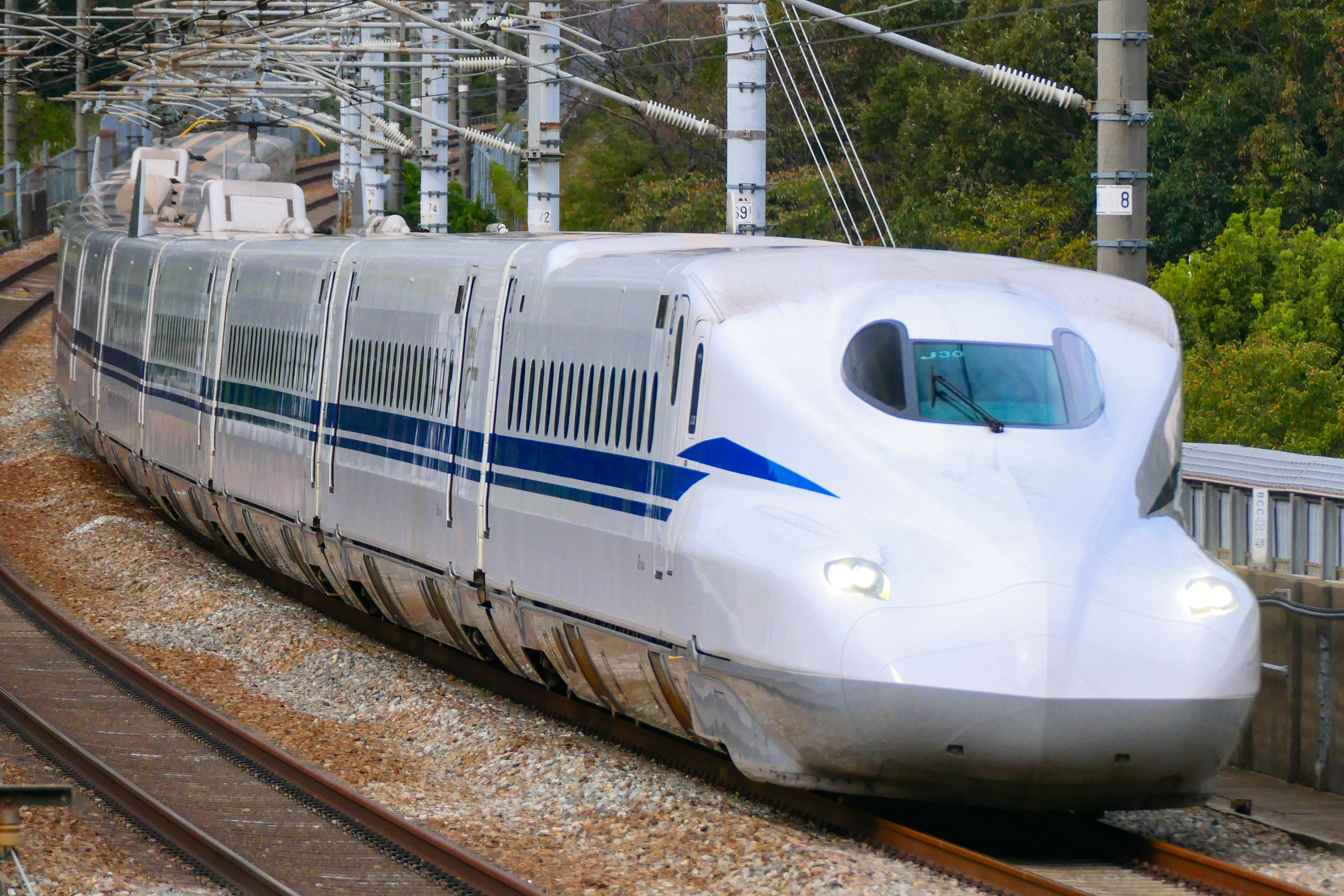
- N700S series train on the San'yo Shinkansen
- Stock type: Electric multiple unit
- In service: 1 July 2020 – present
- Manufacturers: Hitachi; Nippon Sharyo
- Designer: Eiji Mitooka (Nishi Kyushu sets)
- Family name: Shinkansen
- Replaced: N700A series
- Constructed: 2017–present
- Number under construction: JR Central: 19 sets (304 cars)
- Number in service: 56 sets (926 cars, as of December 2025)
- Formation: Tōkaidō, San'yō: 16 cars per trainset; Nishi Kyushu Shinkansen: 6 cars per trainset; Taiwan High Speed Rail: 12 cars per trainset
- Fleet numbers: J0– (JR Central); H1– (JR West); Y1– (JR Kyushu)
- Capacity: 16-car sets: 1,323 (200 Green + 1,123 ordinary); 6-car sets: 391
- Operators: JR Central; JR West; JR Kyushu; Taiwan High Speed Rail (N700ST); Future:Texas Central Railway
- Depots: Tokyo, Hakata, Osaka, Omura
- Lines served: Tōkaidō Shinkansen; San'yō Shinkansen; Hakataminami Line; Nishi Kyushu Shinkansen; Future (2027): Taiwan High Speed Rail

Specifications
- Car body construction: Aluminium
- Car length: End cars: 27.35 m (89 ft 9 in); Intermediate cars: 25 m (82 ft)
- Width: 3.36 m (11 ft 0 in)
- Height: 3.6 m (11 ft 10 in) without rooftop equipment
- Maximum speed: Tōkaidō: 285 km/h (177 mph); San'yō: 300 km/h (190 mph); Nishi-Kyushu: 260 km/h (160 mph); Design speed: 360 km/h (220 mph)
- Traction system: SiC-VVVF
- Electric system: Overhead line, 25 kV 60 Hz AC
- Current collection: Pantograph
- Braking systems: Pneumatic, regenerative
- Track gauge: 1,435 mm (4 ft 8 1/2 in) standard gauge

The N700S series (Japanese: N700S系, Hepburn: Enu nana-hyaku esu-kei) is a Japanese Shinkansen high-speed train with tilting capability operated by JR Central and JR West on the Tokaido and San'yō Shinkansen lines since 2020, and JR Kyushu on the Nishi Kyushu Shinkansen line since 2022. A variant, the N700ST, will be exported to Taiwan for use on the Taiwan High Speed Rail system starting in 2027.

== History ==
In June 2016, JR Central announced plans to build a new prototype 16-car trainset, the N700S (with "S" standing for "Supreme"), to evaluate new technologies and features on the Tokaido and Sanyo Shinkansen lines starting in March 2018.

Developed from the earlier N700A series (itself a refinement of the N700 series), the N700S incorporates several new features. Refinements to the ATC and braking systems enable emergency braking distances to be reduced by 5%, improving safety during events such as earthquakes. The traction system uses silicon carbide components, and combined with a new aerodynamic design, reduces power consumption by approximately 7%. Toshiba SCiB LTO batteries allow the train to operate at low speed during power disruptions, enabling it to move to a safe location for passenger evacuation and maintain essential functions such as toilets.

An optimized underfloor equipment layout makes it possible to use the same standard design for 16-car Tokaido Shinkansen trainsets as well as 12-, 8-, and 6-car configurations, improving flexibility for potential export.

Green cars feature a fully active damping control system to improve ride quality, while ordinary-class cars provide AC power outlets at every seat. Additional improvements include larger luggage storage areas, more CCTV cameras, an upgraded intercom system, and softer, more relaxing interior lighting.

In 2021, the N700S was awarded the Laurel Prize by the Japan Railfan Club.

=== JR Central ===
A 16-car prototype set (J0), assembled at the Nippon Sharyo Toyokawa plant, was unveiled at JR Central's Hamamatsu depot on 10 March 2018. From 20 March, this set was used for testing and evaluation. High-speed trials at the design speed of 360 km/h (224 mph) were conducted during 2019 on the Tokaido Shinkansen, reaching a maximum speed of 363 km/h (226 mph). This is 28 km/h (17 mph) faster than the fastest speed ever achieved by the N700A, and may indicate plans to raise the maximum operating speed on the line.

The first full-production J set (J1) was delivered to JR Central in April 2020, with trains entering revenue service on 1 July 2020.

JR Central announced in May 2022 that it would add 19 trainsets (304 vehicles) to their current N700S fleet at a cost of 114 billion yen ($897m). The first two of these trainsets are scheduled to enter service in 2023, with seven trainsets delivered in 2024 and 2025, and three more delivered in 2026.

In June 2024, JR Central announced that the Doctor Yellow inspection trains would be replaced by stock-standard N700S trainsets with special monitoring equipment from 2027. These sets, named "Doctor S", began passenger service in October 2026, with full scale inspection runs to commence in January 2027.

In January 2026, JR Central announced that they would begin to introduce private rooms on N700S Nozomi trains starting in October 2026. Two private rooms will initially be offered on selected services, each seating one or two passengers. The rooms will be priced higher than green car seats. It will mark the first time that private rooms will be available on the Tōkaidō Shinkansen since the retirement of the 100 Series Shinkansen in 2003. JR Central has also planned to introduce semi-private rooms in fiscal year 2028.

=== JR Kyushu ===
As of December 2024, the Nishi Kyushu Shinkansen is operated by a fleet of five 6-car JR Kyushu N700S series trainsets.

For the commencement of the Nishi Kyushu Shinkansen, four 6-car N700S series trainsets were ordered by JR Kyushu. Nicknamed "Kamome", these entered service in September 2022. Two trains are required during the day, with three trains in operation in the afternoon/evening. One train is kept as a spare.

In August 2023, another 6-car set was delivered to allow for one train to be out of service during regular inspections.

== Operations ==
The first N700S sets replaced older N700A series trains, and added more rolling stock needed to realize the increased amount of services on the Tokaido Shinkansen planned from 2020. The N700S series is expected to gradually replace N700 series sets on the Sanyo, Tokaido, and Kyushu Shinkansen lines. A 6-car variant started operations on the Nishi Kyushu Shinkansen on 23 September 2022.

The train is also planned to run on the proposed Texas Central Railway high-speed line connecting Dallas and Houston.

== Variants ==
- N700S series: 50 ⨯ 16-car "J" sets owned by JR Central, introduced from 1 July 2020
- N700S-3000 series: 5 ⨯ 16-car "H" sets owned by JR West, introduced from 13 March 2021
- N700S-8000 series "Kamome": 5 ⨯ 6-car "Y" sets owned by JR Kyushu on the Nishi Kyushu Shinkansen, introduced from 23 September 2022

=== 16-car J sets ===
The J sets were the first to be introduced, and include the pre-series J0 set used for testing between 2018 and 2020.

==== Formation ====
The 16-car J sets are formed as follows.

Car no.	1	2	3	4	5	6	7	8	9	10	11	12	13	14	15	16
Designation	Tc	M2	M'w	M1	M1w	M'	M2k	M1s	M's	M2s	M'h	M1	M1w	M'	M2w	T'c
Numbering	743	747	746-500	745	745-300	746	747-400	735	736	737	746-700	745-600	745-500	746-200	747-500	744
Seating capacity	65	100	85	100	90	100	75	68	64	68	63	100	90	100	80	75
Facilities	Toilets		Toilets, smoking room	Telephone	Toilets		Toilets, smoking room	Conductor's office	Toilets, telephone	Smoking room	Toilets, wheelchair space, multi-purpose room	Telephone	Toilets		Toilets, smoking room, telephone	

==== Fleet list ====
As of 1 April 2025, the JR Central N700S series 'J' set fleet is as follows.

Set no.	Manufacturer	Date delivered	Remarks
J0	Hitachi/Nippon Sharyo	25 March 2018	Pre-series set
J1	Nippon Sharyo	14 April 2020	Fiscal 2020 batch
J2	Hitachi	16 June 2020	Fiscal 2020 batch
J3	Nippon Sharyo	20 May 2020	Fiscal 2020 batch
J4	Hitachi	9 September 2020	Fiscal 2020 batch
J5	Nippon Sharyo	23 June 2020	Fiscal 2020 batch
J6	Hitachi	30 November 2020	Fiscal 2020 batch
J7	Nippon Sharyo	26 August 2020	Fiscal 2020 batch
J8	Nippon Sharyo	2 October 2020	Fiscal 2020 batch
J9	Nippon Sharyo	11 November 2020	Fiscal 2020 batch
J10	Hitachi	11 January 2021	Fiscal 2020 batch
J11	Nippon Sharyo	19 December 2020	Fiscal 2020 batch
J12	Hitachi	23 February 2021	Fiscal 2020 batch
J13	Nippon Sharyo	3 April 2021	Fiscal 2021 batch
J14	Hitachi	11 May 2021	Fiscal 2021 batch
J15	Nippon Sharyo	23 May 2021	Fiscal 2021 batch
J16	Hitachi	10 July 2021	Fiscal 2021 batch
J17	Nippon Sharyo	3 July 2021	Fiscal 2021 batch
J18	Nippon Sharyo	3 September 2021	Fiscal 2021 batch
J19	Nippon Sharyo	1 October 2021	Fiscal 2021 batch
J20	Hitachi	1 November 2021	Fiscal 2021 batch
J21	Nippon Sharyo	12 November 2021	Fiscal 2021 batch
J22	Hitachi	14 December 2021	Fiscal 2021 batch
J23	Nippon Sharyo	7 January 2022	Fiscal 2021 batch
J24	Hitachi	1 March 2022	Fiscal 2021 batch
J25	Nippon Sharyo	15 February 2022	Fiscal 2021 batch
J26	Nippon Sharyo	1 April 2022	Fiscal 2021 batch
J27	Hitachi	19 April 2022	Fiscal 2022 batch
J28	Nippon Sharyo	20 May 2022	Fiscal 2022 batch
J29	Hitachi	24 June 2022	Fiscal 2022 batch
J30	Nippon Sharyo	8 July 2022	Fiscal 2022 batch
J31	Nippon Sharyo	24 August 2022	Fiscal 2022 batch
J32	Nippon Sharyo	4 October 2022	Fiscal 2022 batch
J33	Hitachi	8 November 2022	Fiscal 2022 batch
J34	Nippon Sharyo	18 November 2022	Fiscal 2022 batch
J35	Hitachi	20 January 2023	Fiscal 2022 batch
J36	Nippon Sharyo	11 January 2023	Fiscal 2022 batch
J37	Hitachi	6 March 2023	Fiscal 2022 batch
J38	Nippon Sharyo	20 February 2023	Fiscal 2022 batch
J39	Hitachi	18 April 2023	Fiscal 2022 batch
J40	Nippon Sharyo	5 April 2023	Fiscal 2022 batch
J41	Nippon Sharyo	5 March 2024	Fiscal 2023 batch
J42	Nippon Sharyo	22 March 2024	Fiscal 2023 batch
J43	Nippon Sharyo	24 May 2024	Fiscal 2023 batch
J44	Hitachi	9 July 2024	Fiscal 2023 batch
J45	Nippon Sharyo	17 July 2024	Fiscal 2023 batch
J46	Nippon Sharyo	28 August 2024	Fiscal 2024 batch
J47	Hitachi	22 October 2024	Fiscal 2024 batch
J48	Nippon Sharyo	15 November 2024	Fiscal 2024 batch
J49	Nippon Sharyo	24 January 2025	Fiscal 2024 batch
J50	Nippon Sharyo	7 March 2025	Fiscal 2024 batch
J51	Hitachi	18 April 2025	Fiscal 2024 batch
J52	Nippon Sharyo	9 May 2025	Fiscal 2024 batch
J53	Hitachi	10 July 2025	Fiscal 2025 batch
J54	Nippon Sharyo	19 September 2025	Fiscal 2025 batch
J55	Hitachi	3 October 2025	Fiscal 2025 batch
J56	Nippon Sharyo	17 February 2026	Fiscal 2025 batch
J57	Nippon Sharyo	26 March 2026	Fiscal 2025 batch
J58	Hitachi	29 May 2026	Fiscal 2025 batch
J59	Hitachi	31 July 2026	Fiscal 2026 batch
J60	Nippon Sharyo	6 August 2026	Fiscal 2026 batch
J61	Hitachi	25 September 2026	Fiscal 2026 batch

=== 16-car H sets (N700S-3000 series) ===
These are 16-car N700S series sets owned by JR West and classified as N700S-3000 series sets.

==== Formation ====
The 16-car H sets are formed as follows.

Car no.	1	2	3	4	5	6	7	8	9	10	11	12	13	14	15	16
Designation	Tc	M2	M'w	M1	M1w	M'	M2k	M1s	M's	M2s	M'h	M1	M1w	M'	M2w	T'c
Numbering	743-3000	747-3000	746-3500	745-3000	745-3300	746-3000	747-3400	735-3000	736-3000	737-3000	746-3700	745-3600	745-3500	746-3200	747-3500	744-3000
Seating capacity	65	100	85	100	90	100	75	68	64	68	63	100	90	100	80	75
Facilities	Toilets		Toilets, smoking room	Telephone	Toilets		Toilets, smoking room	Conductor's office	Toilets, telephone	Smoking room	Toilets, wheelchair space, multi-purpose room	Telephone	Toilets		Toilets, smoking room, telephone	

==== Fleet list ====
As of December 2025, the JR West N700S series 'H' set fleet is as follows.

Set no.	Manufacturer	Date delivered	Remarks
H1	Hitachi	3 February 2021	Fiscal 2020 batch
H2	Nippon Sharyo	17 March 2021	Fiscal 2020 batch
H3	Hitachi	27 July 2023	Fiscal 2023 batch
H4	Nippon Sharyo	17 December 2023	Fiscal 2023 batch
H5	Nippon Sharyo	11 September 2024	Fiscal 2024 batch
H6	Hitachi	20 October 2025	Fiscal 2025 batch
H7	Hitachi	10 March 2026	Fiscal 2025 batch
H8	Nippon Sharyo	13 June 2026	Fiscal 2025 batch

=== Gallery ===
==== Exterior ====
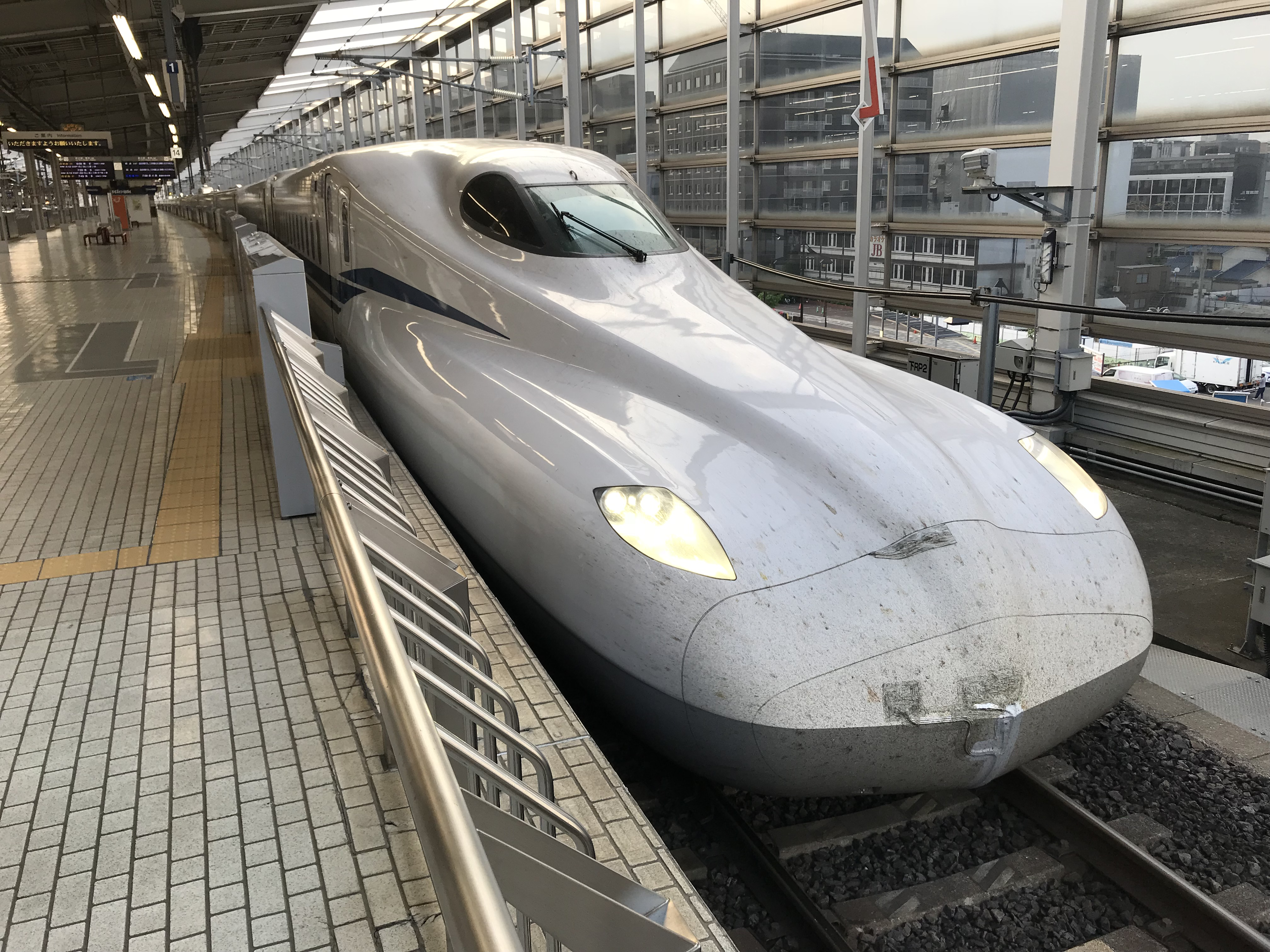
Nose and cab

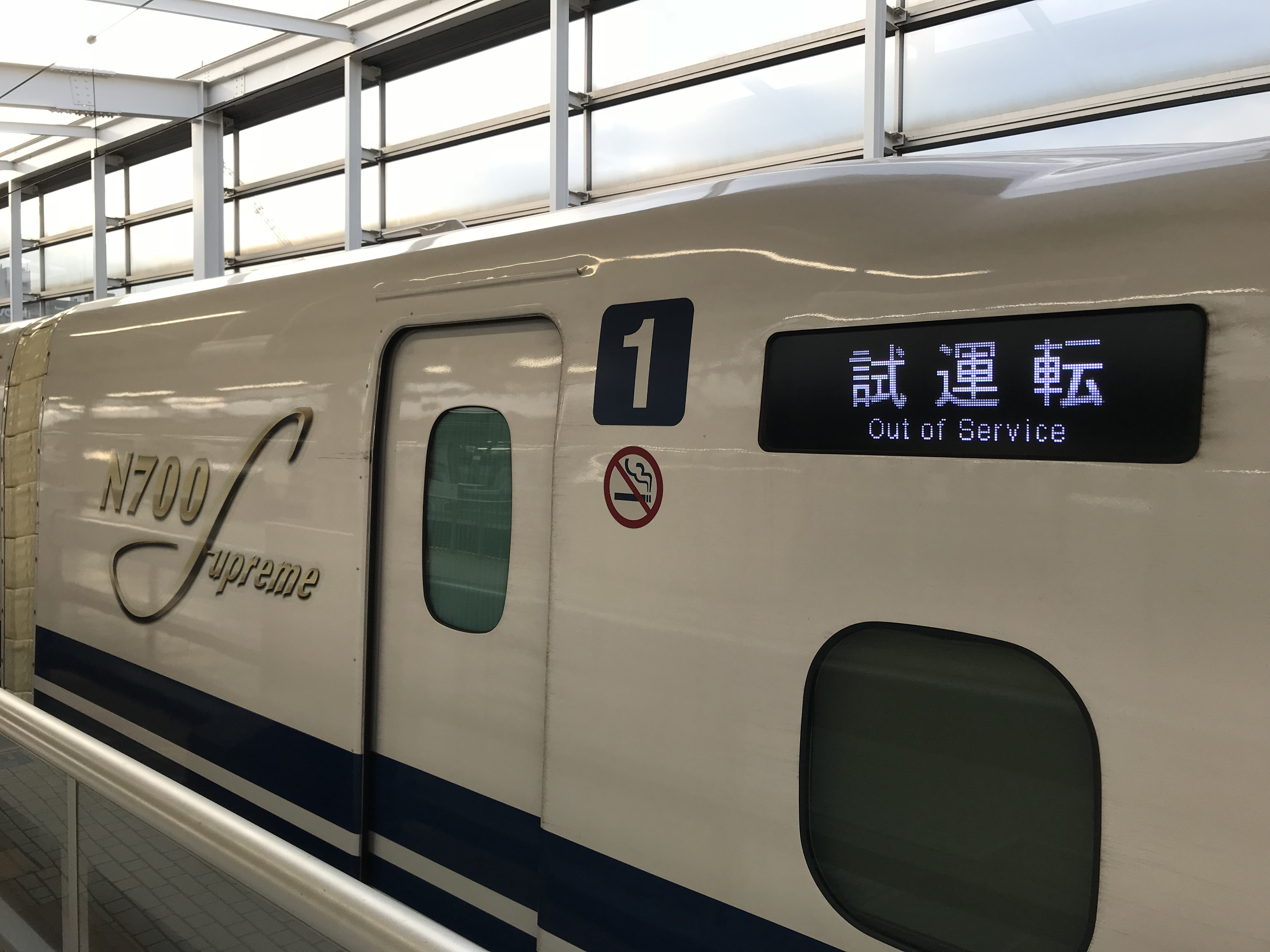
Entrance door and sign

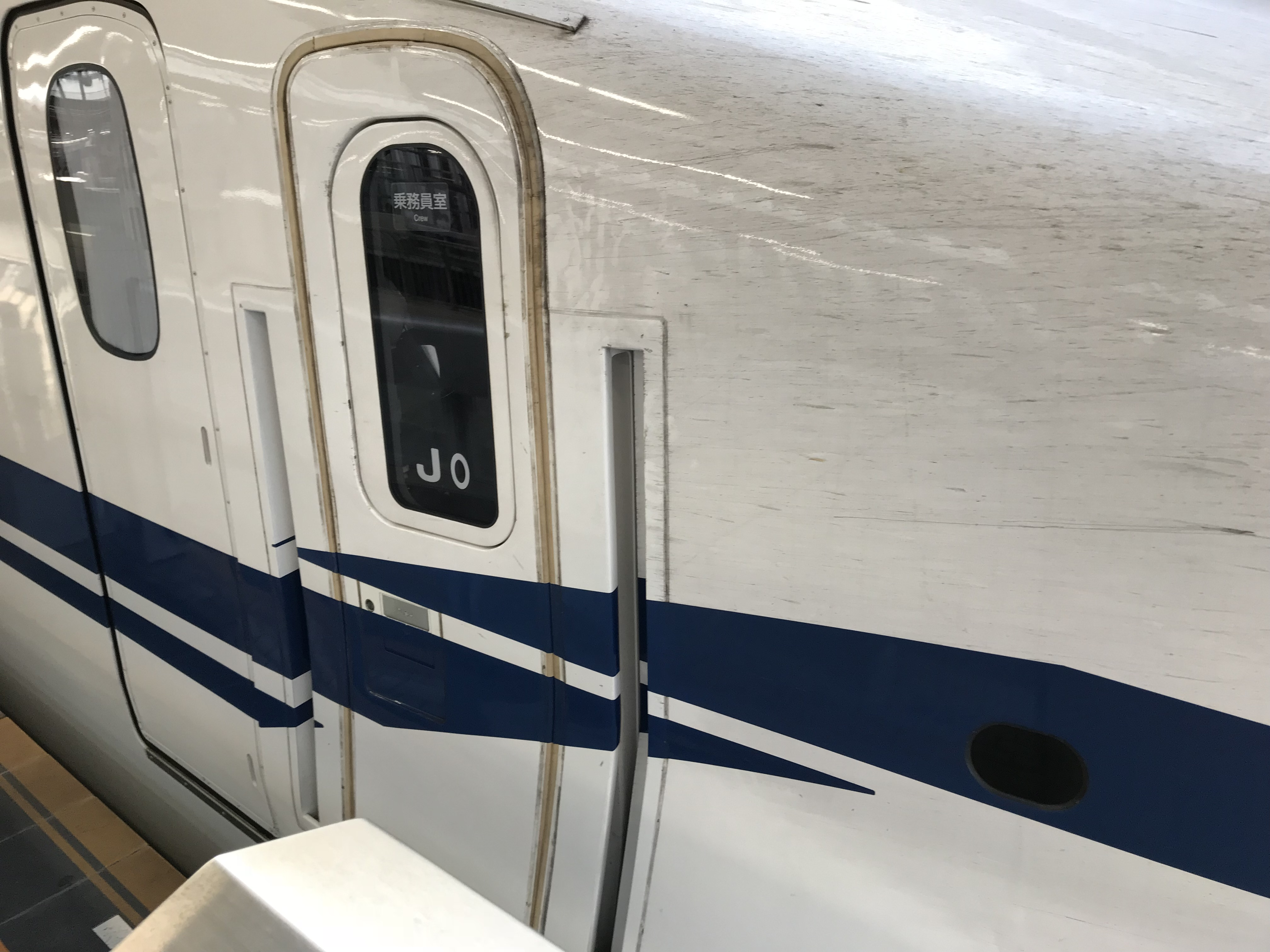
Cab door

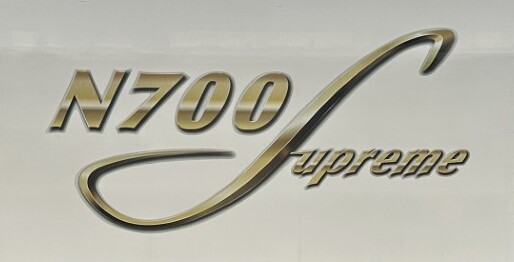
N700S logo

==== Interior ====
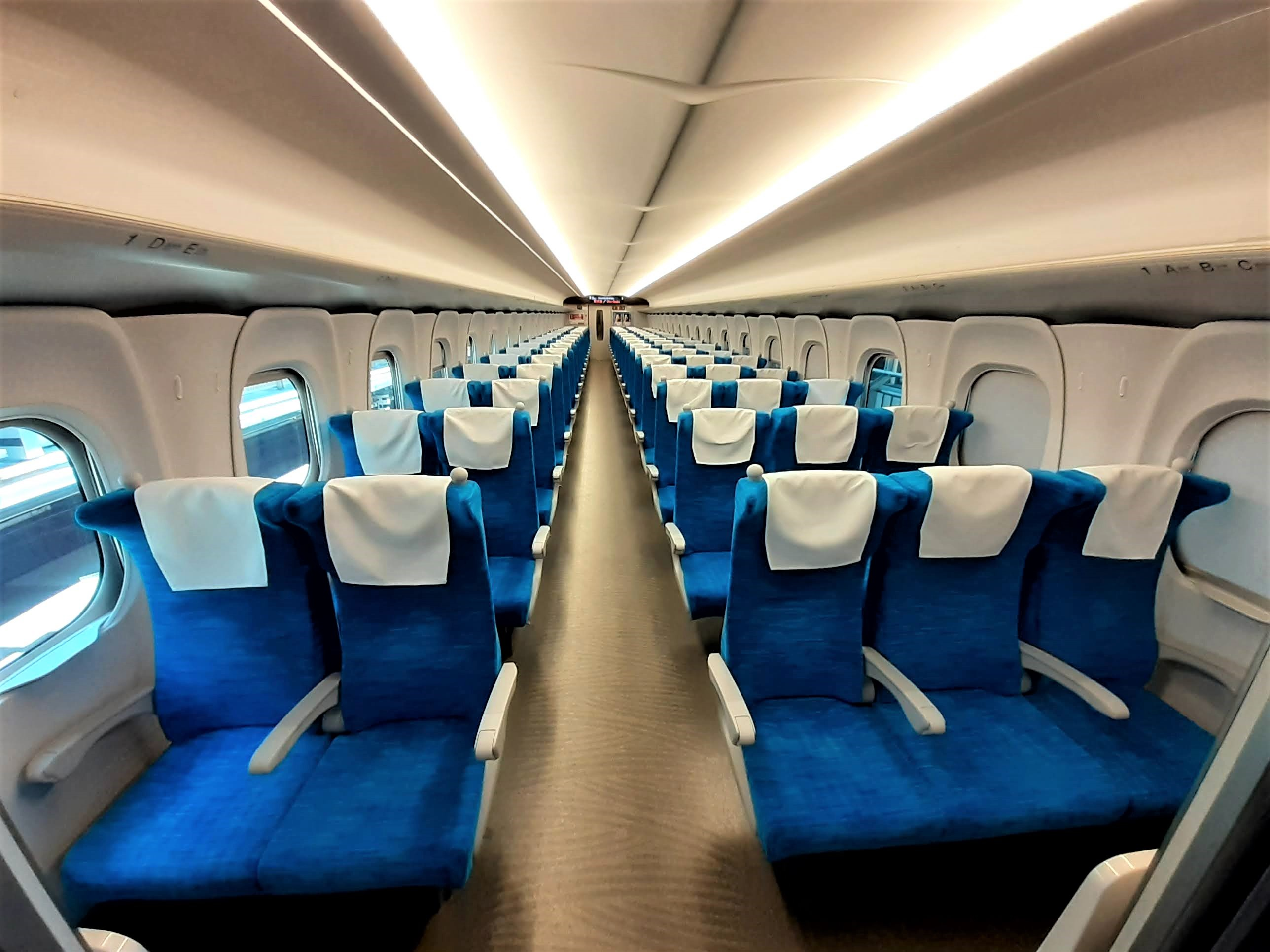
Ordinary car

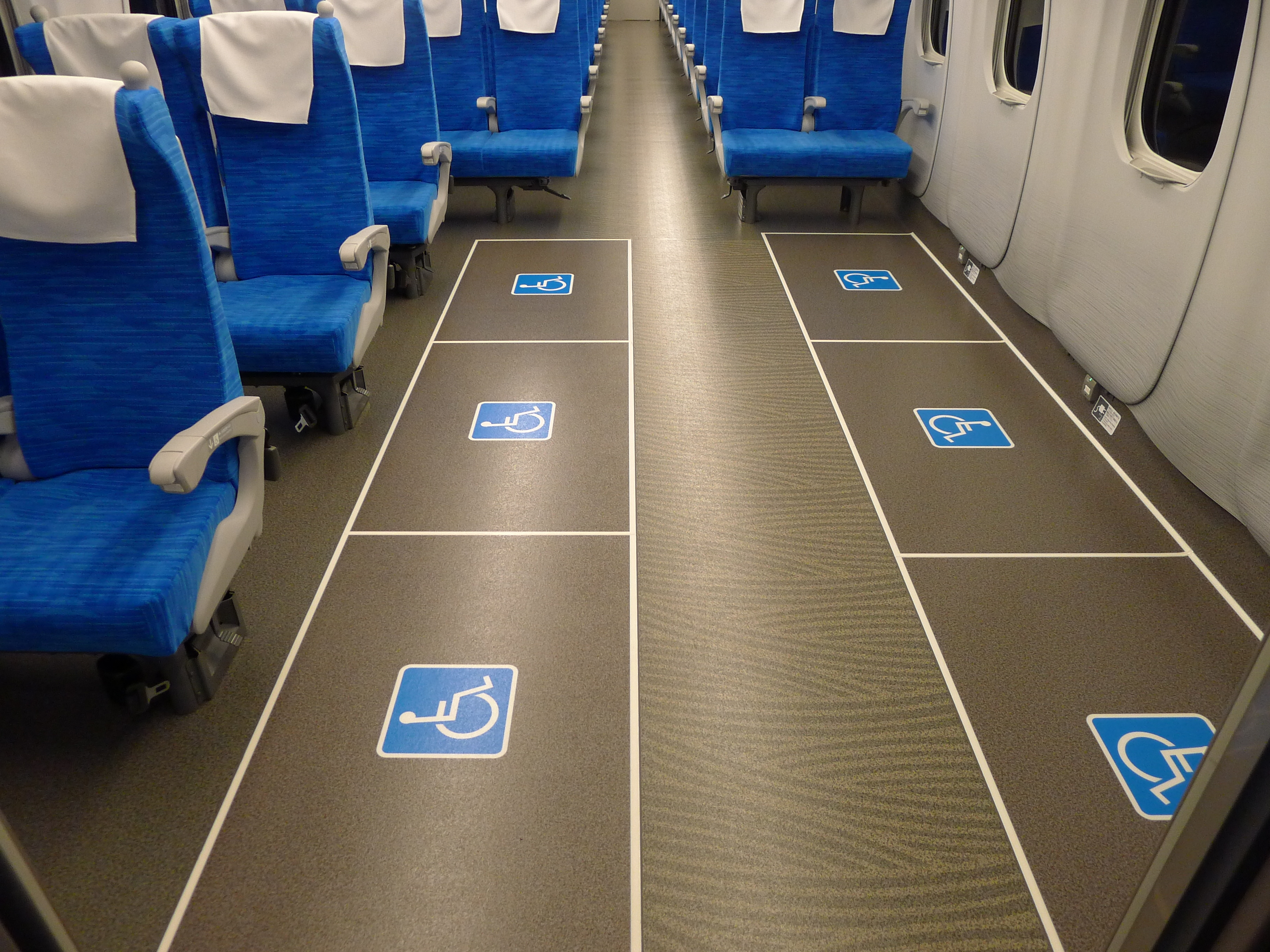
Wheelchair spaces

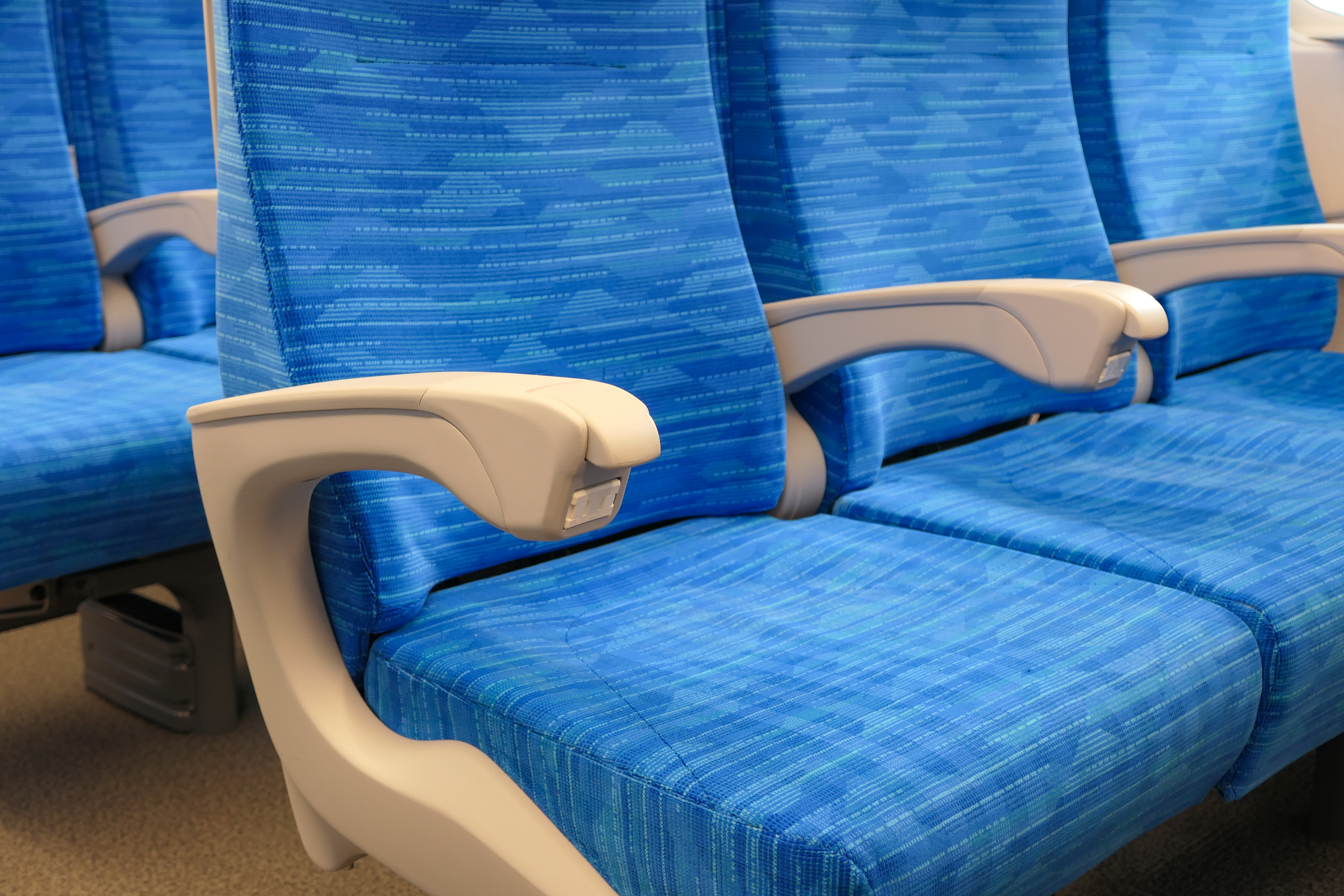
Power outlets on seat armrests

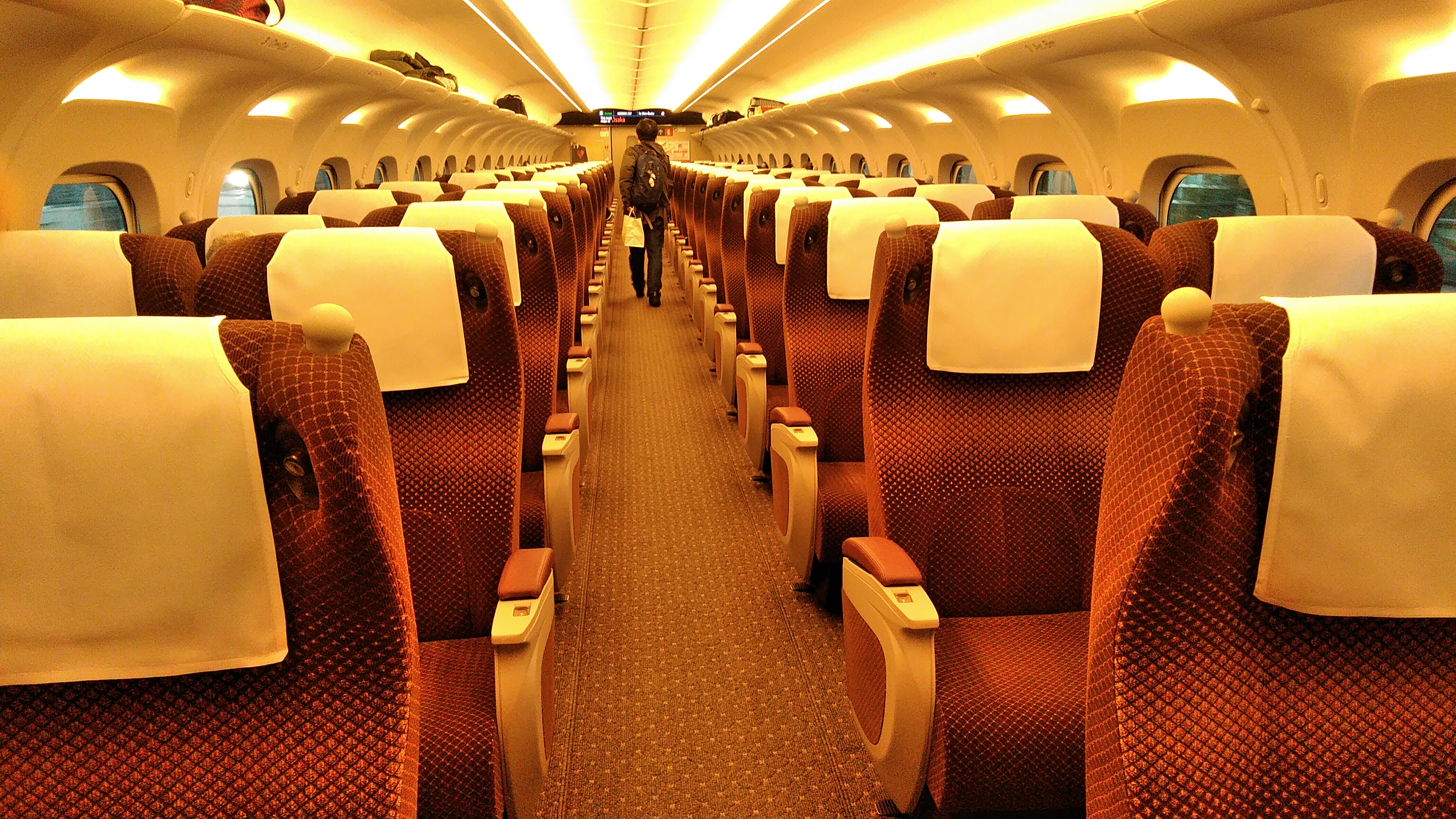
Green car

=== 6-car Y sets (N700S-8000 series) ===
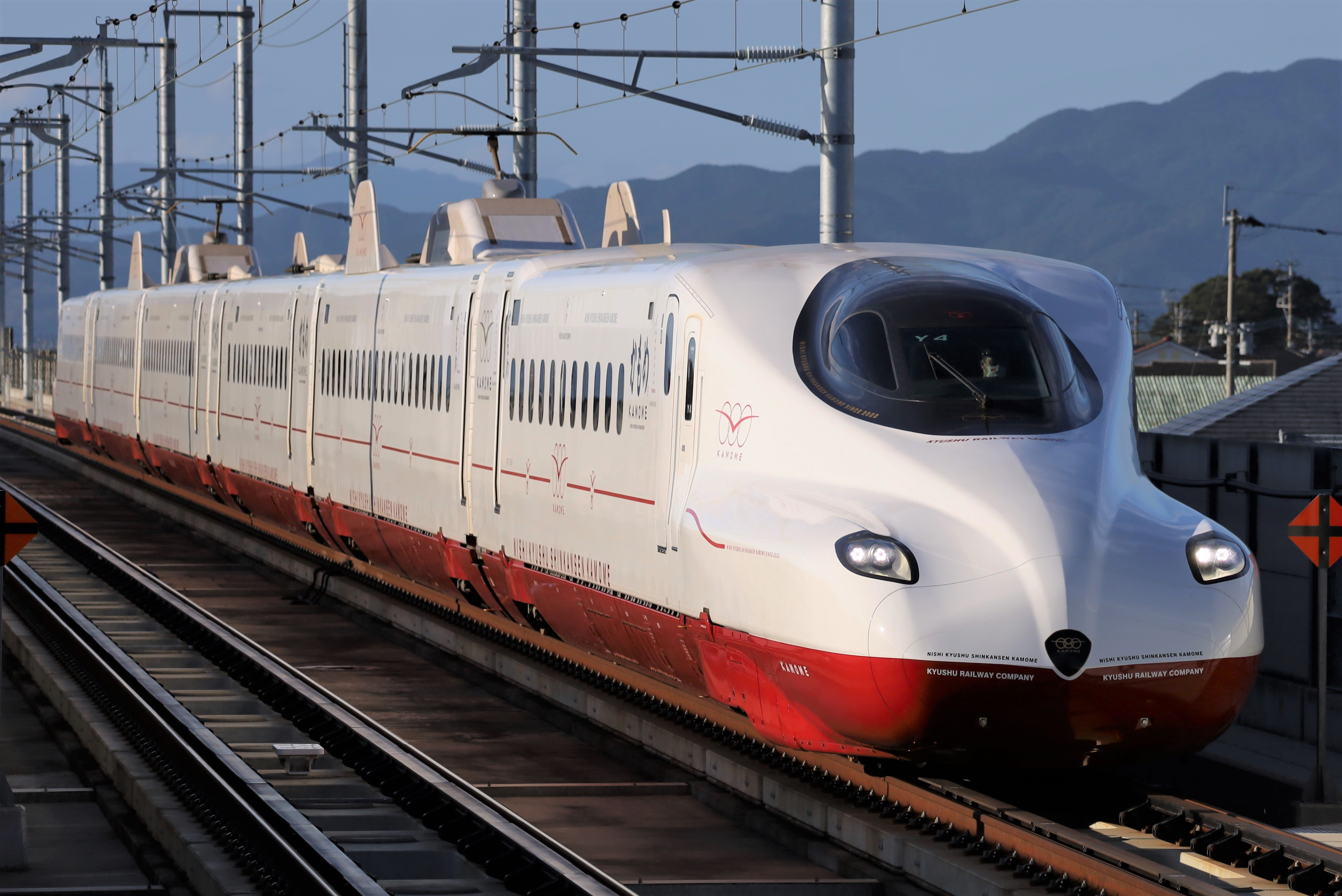
N700S-8000 series set Y4 on the Nishi Kyushu Shinkansen in October 2022

These are 6-car N700S series sets owned by JR Kyushu and classified as N700S-8000 series sets. Five sets provide service on the Nishi Kyushu Shinkansen.

The design of the variant was done by Eiji Mitooka, who had previously designed several trains for JR Kyushu. He could not make any modifications to the exterior shape or equipment. He sought to make the ride "more fun and relaxing" through the inclusion of colors and shapes to the train's design. He presented JR Kyushu with four livery concepts, with a red and white one being chosen. Headlights were given black outlines and the center of the nose was painted black in order to have the front of the train resemble a face. The interior is also decorated with illustrations made by Mitooka.

These sets do not feature Green Car (first class) accommodation. In regular service, cars 1-3 are reserved seat cars, and cars 4-6 are non-reserved seat cars. Seats on cars 1–3 are arranged in four wide (2+2) abreast configuration instead of a five wide (2+3) configuration seen in normal reserved cars of JR West and JR Central N700S variants, and similar to reserved seat cars on JR Kyushu's N700 series sets. This was done to make the Shinkansen more attractive to tourists.

==== Formation ====
The 6-car Y sets are formed as follows.

Car no.	1	2	3	4	5	6
Designation	M'wc	M2	M1h	M1	M2w	M'c
Class	Reserved	Reserved	Reserved	Non-reserved	Non-reserved	Non-reserved
Numbering	721-8000	727-8000	725-8000	725-8100	727-8100	722-8100
Seating capacity	40	76	42	86	86	61
Facilities			Wheelchair space	Toilets, multi-purpose room		

==== Interior ====
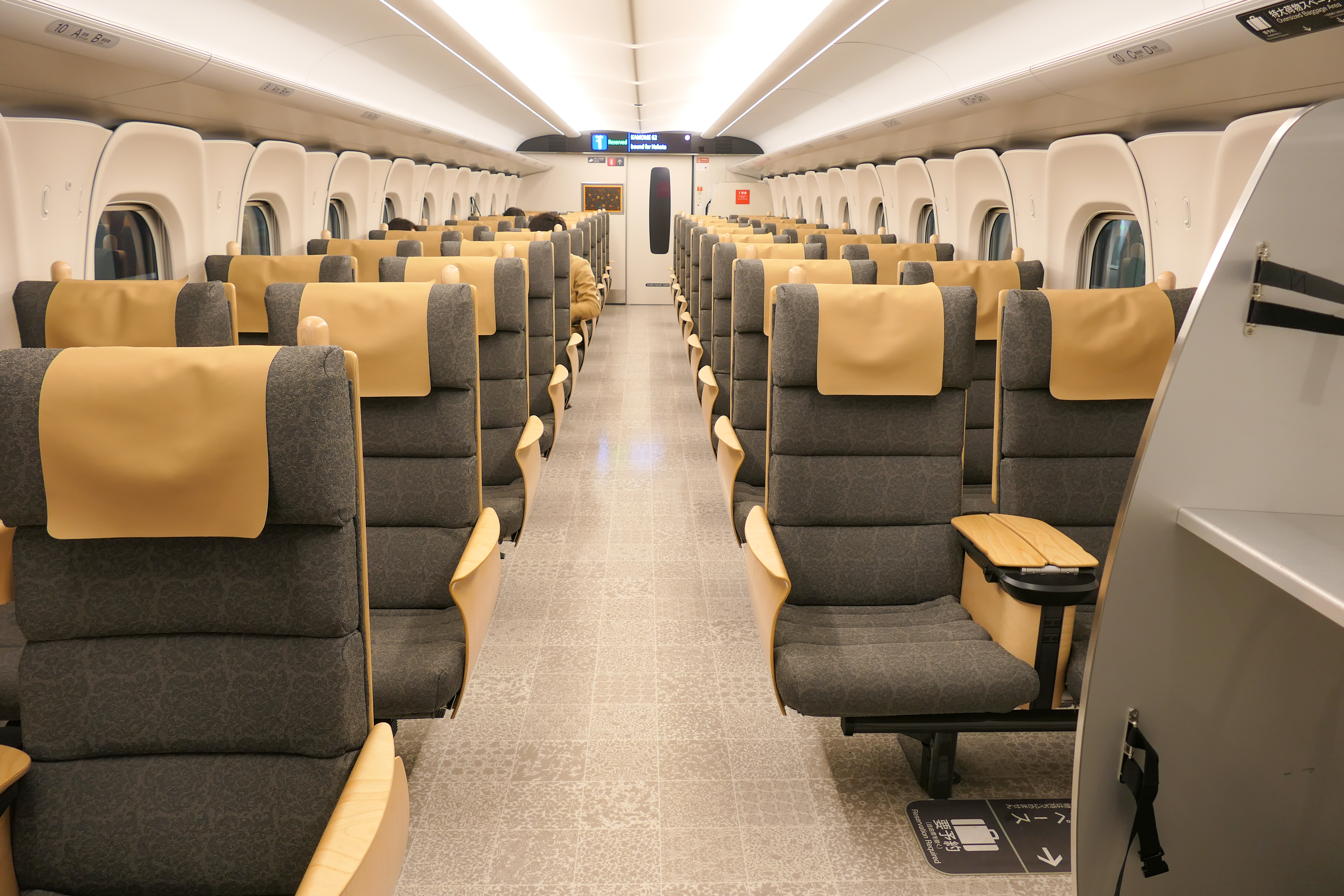
Reserved seating

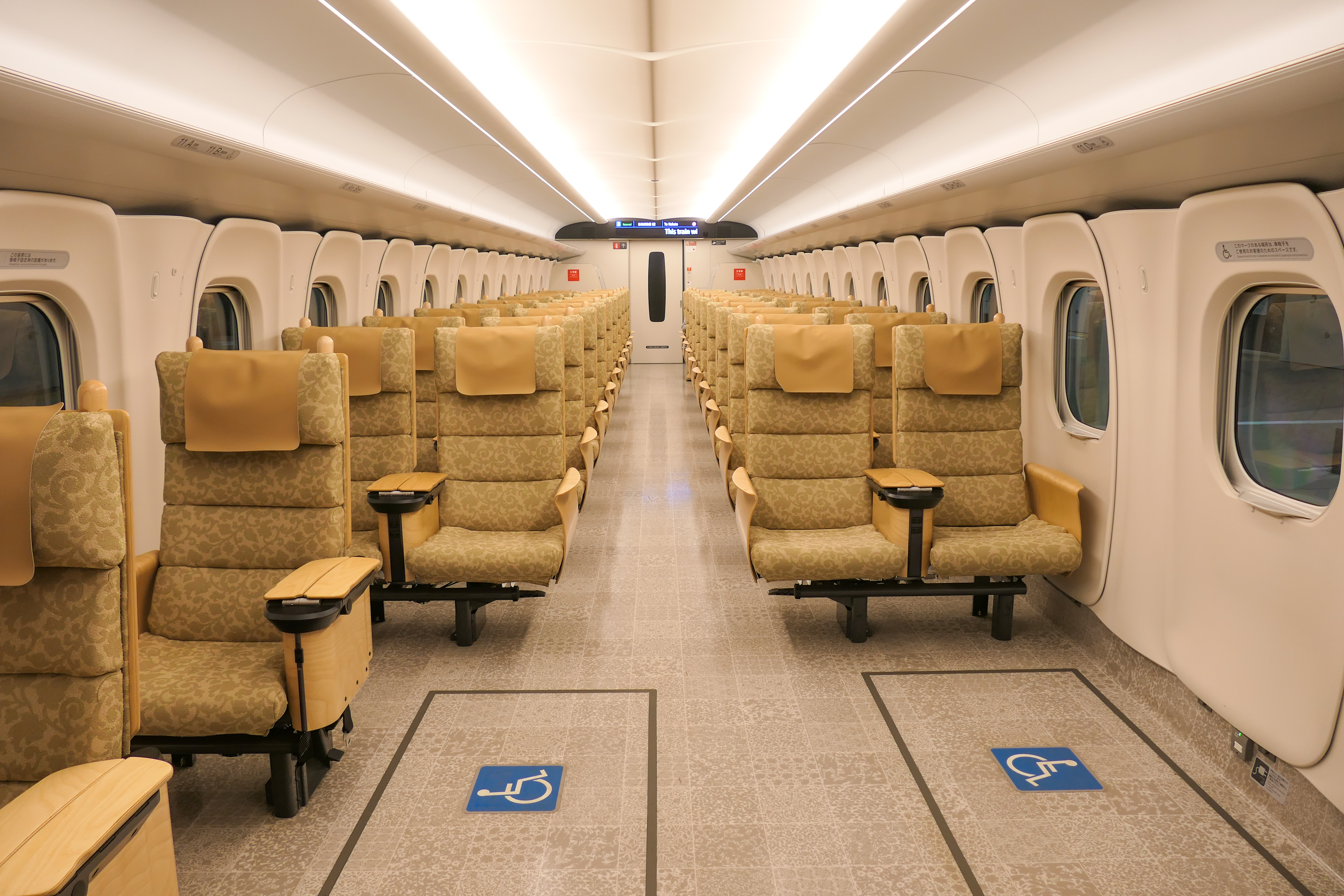
Reserved seating with wheelchair space

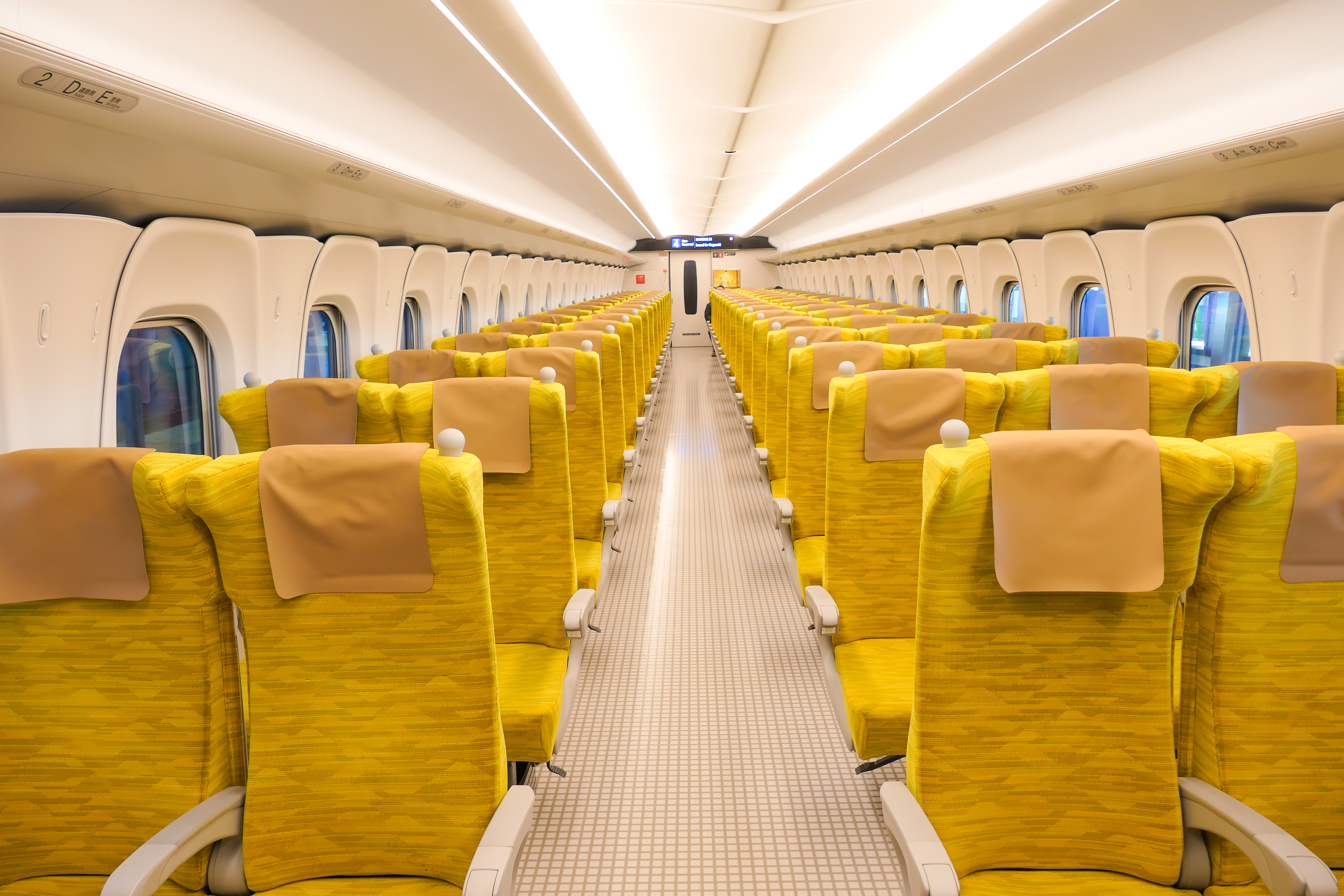
Non-reserved seating

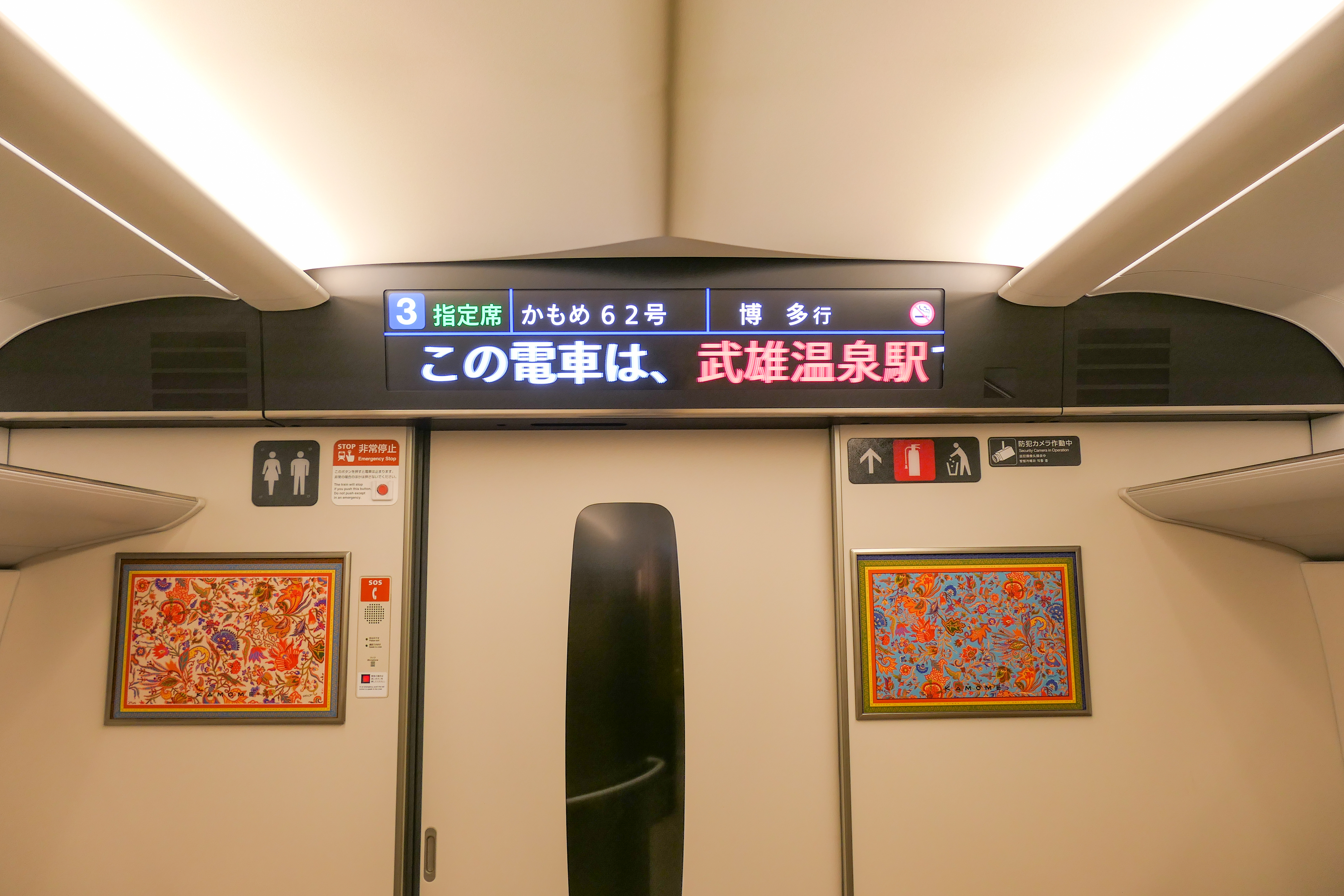
Information display

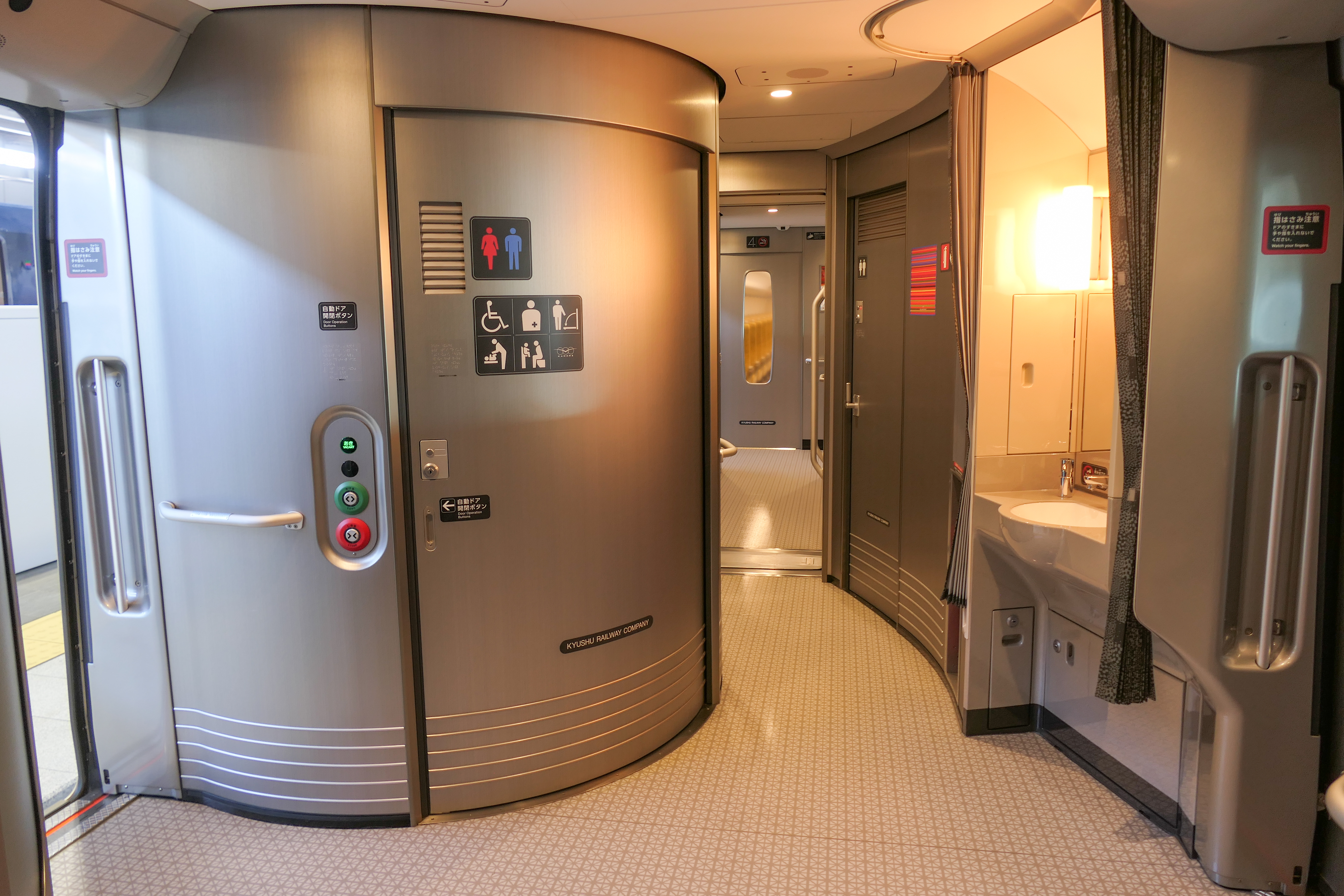
Toilets and washroom in Car 4

==== Fleet list ====
As of 1 April 2024, the JR Kyushu N700S series 'Y' set fleet is as follows.

Set no.	Manufacturer	Date delivered
Y1	Hitachi	1 June 2022
Y2	Hitachi	1 June 2022
Y3	Hitachi	1 July 2022
Y4	Hitachi	1 September 2022
Y5	Hitachi	5 October 2023

== Overall fleet history ==
The annual totals for the fleet sizes (number of vehicles as of 1 April each year) are as follows.

Year	■ JR Central	■ JR West	■ JR Kyushu	Total
2018	16	0	0	16
2019	16	0	0	16
2020	16	0	0	16
2021	208	32	0	240
2022	432	32	0	464
2023	608	32	24	664

== Derivatives ==
In March 2023, Taiwan High Speed Rail announced it will purchase 12 new 12-car trains based on the N700S at a cost of approximately NTD 28 billion to supplement its older THSR 700T sets. These will be manufactured by an alliance of Hitachi and Toshiba.

In August 2025, these new trains were officially designated as the N700ST series. The first set of the new trains is expected to arrive in Taiwan in August 2026 and revenue service is scheduled to start in the second half of 2027.

Taiwan received its first Japan-built N700ST Shinkansen on August 15, 2026, when all 12 carriages were unloaded from a cargo vessel at a port in Kaohsiung, south-western Taiwan. The train has a white exterior marked by distinctive orange and black stripes. The arrival marks the first of 12 N700ST trainsets ordered by Taiwan High Speed Rail Corporation, with each set comprising 12 carriages. They are due to enter service progressively from July 2027 and are expected to increase capacity during peak periods by 25%.

== See also ==
- List of high-speed trains
