= Takeo-Onsen Station =

Railway station in Takeo, Saga Prefecture, Japan

Takeo-Onsen Station 武雄温泉駅
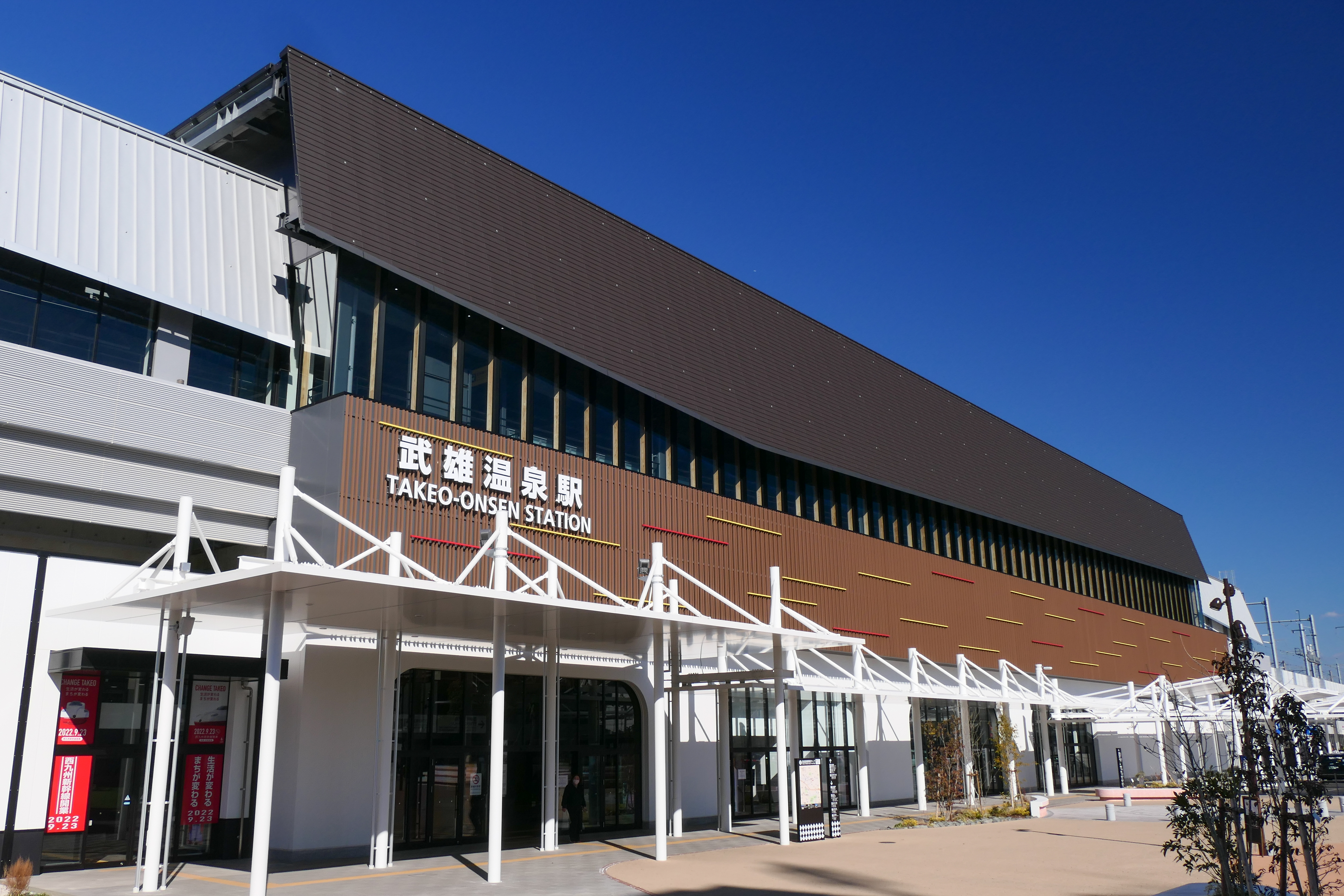
- The south entrance of the station in 2023

General information
- Location: Takeo, Saga; Japan
- Coordinates: 33°11′48″N 130°01′25″E
- Operator: JR Kyushu
- Lines: Nishi Kyushu Shinkansen; Sasebo Line
- Distance: Sasebo Line: 13.7 km (8.5 mi) from Hizen-Yamaguchi; Nishi Kyushu Shinkansen: 66 km (41 mi) from Nagasaki
- Platforms: 2 side + 2 island platforms
- Tracks: 3

Construction
- Structure type: Elevated
- Parking: Available, rentals available
- Accessible: Yes, elevators to platforms

Other information
- Status: Ticket window (Midori no Madoguchi)
- Website: Official website

History
- Opened: 5 May 1895
- Rebuilt: 2009
- Former names: Takeo (until 19 June 1975)

Passengers
- FY2016: 1,728 daily
- Rank: 106th (among JR Kyushu stations)

Services
| Preceding station | JR Kyushu | Following station |
|---|---|---|
| Ureshino-Onsen towards Nagasaki | Nishi Kyushu Shinkansen Kamome | Terminus |
| Terminus | Relay Kamome | Kōhoku towards Hakata |
| Arita towards Sasebo or Huis Ten Bosch | Midori and Huis Ten Bosch | Kōhoku towards Hakata |
| Nagao towards Sasebo | Sasebo Line | Takahashi towards Kōhoku |
Location
- Location within Saga Prefecture Location within Japan

Takeo-Onsen Station (Japanese: 武雄温泉駅, Hepburn: Takeo-Onsen eki) is a railway station operated by Kyushu Railway Company (JR Kyushu) in Takeo, Saga, Japan. It is operated by JR Kyushu and is served by the Nishi Kyushu Shinkansen and the Sasebo Line.

== Lines ==
The station is served by the Sasebo Line and is located 13.7 km (8.5 mi) from the line’s starting point at Hizen-Yamaguchi. In addition to local Sasebo Line services, JR Kyushu limited express services Midori (Hakata–Sasebo) and Huis Ten Bosch (Hakata–Huis Ten Bosch) also stop at the station.

Nishi Kyushu Shinkansen Kamome services to and from Nagasaki terminate here. For Shinkansen passengers, connections to Hakata are provided by the limited express Relay Kamome service, with a cross-platform transfer at Takeo-Onsen.

== Station layout ==
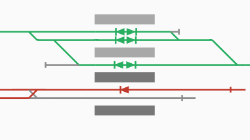
Track diagram as of October 2022. Red indicates the Shinkansen line, and green indicates the conventional line

The station building is a modern structure with entrances located on both the north and south sides of the elevated tracks.

The platform layout reflects the station’s dual role as both the current cross-platform transfer point between the Nishi Kyushu Shinkansen and connecting conventional rail services, and a future through station once the Shinkansen is extended to Hakata. The station has two side platforms and two island platforms serving five elevated tracks. Nishi Kyushu Shinkansen Kamome services to and from Nagasaki use Track 11, while limited express Relay Kamome services use Track 10 to and from Hakata, allowing for cross-platform transfers. Track 12 is not currently in regular use, but was constructed for future operations following the extension of the Shinkansen to Hakata. Tracks 1 and 2 are used by the Sasebo Line, including Midori and Huis Ten Bosch services. Track 3 (currently numbered Track 10) is equipped with fixed platform barriers to prevent boarding; these barriers can be removed once the Shinkansen extension is completed, allowing the track to be reassigned for conventional services.

Station facilities include a midori-no-madoguchi staffed ticket office, a waiting room, a café, retail shops, and the Takeo Tourist Information Centre. Parking is available beneath the elevated structure, and car rental services are offered.

=== Tracks ===
| 1 | Midori, Huis Ten Bosch | for Saga, Hakata |
| 1 | Sasebo Line | for Hizen-Yamaguchi, Tosu |
| 2 | Midori, Huis Ten Bosch | for Sasebo, Huis Ten Bosch |
| 2 | Sasebo Line | for Arita, Haiki |
| 10 (3) | Relay Kamome | for Kōhoku, Saga, Tosu, Hakata |
| 11 | Kamome | for Shin-Omura, Isahaya, Nagasaki |
| 12 | Nishi Kyushu Shinkansen | not in use |

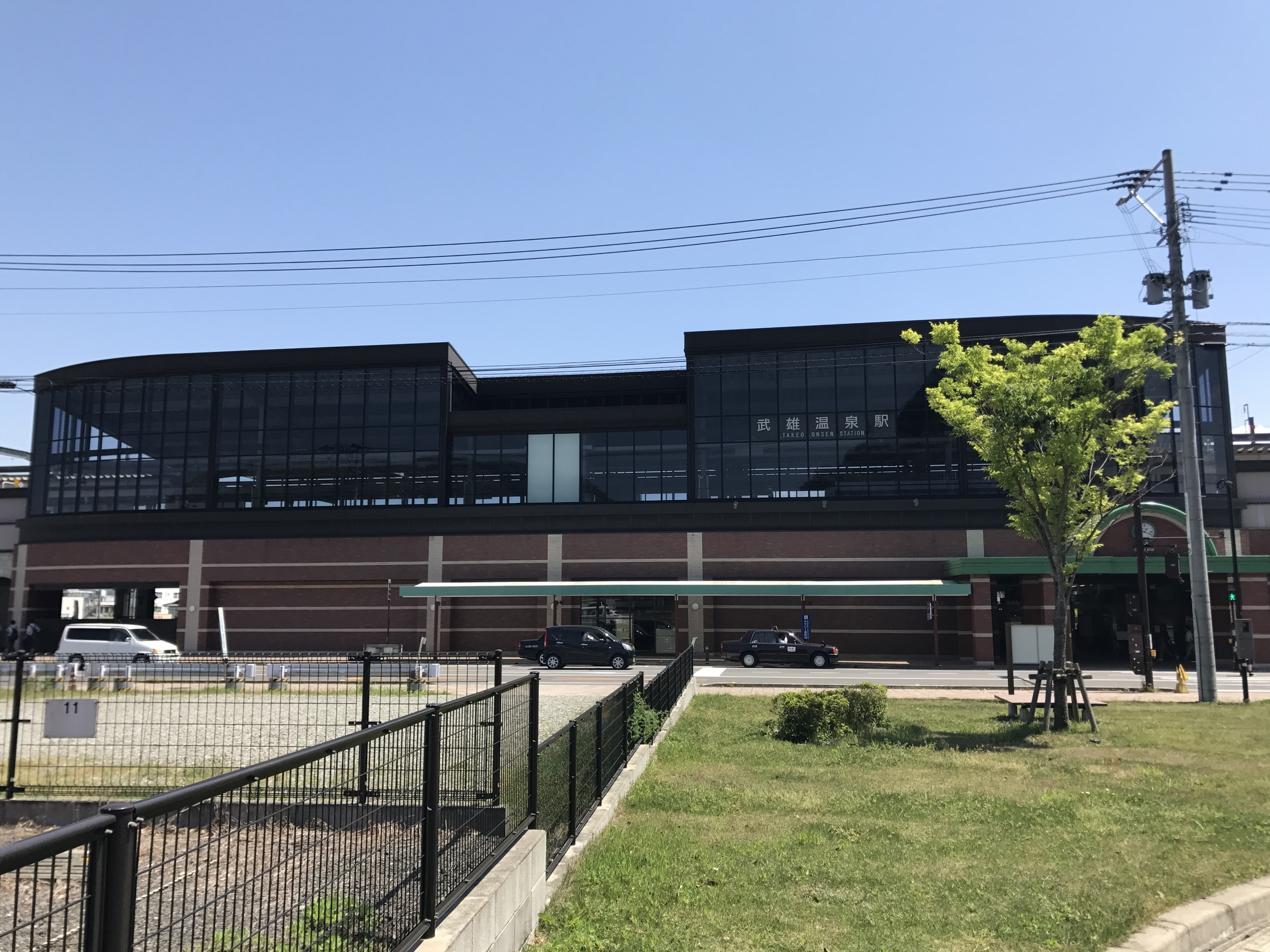
The north entrance of the station in 2017.

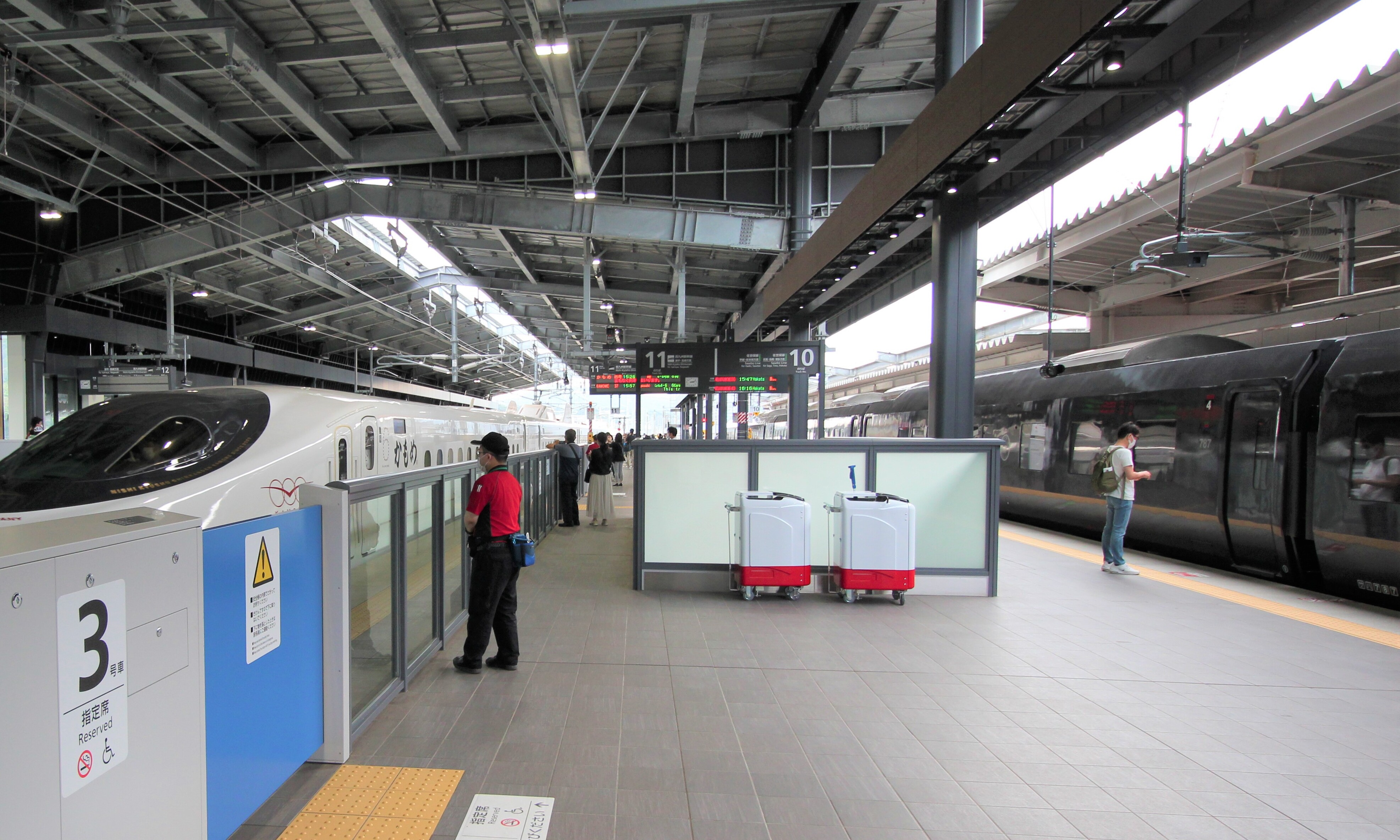
The transfer platform (tracks 10 and 11) in September 2022

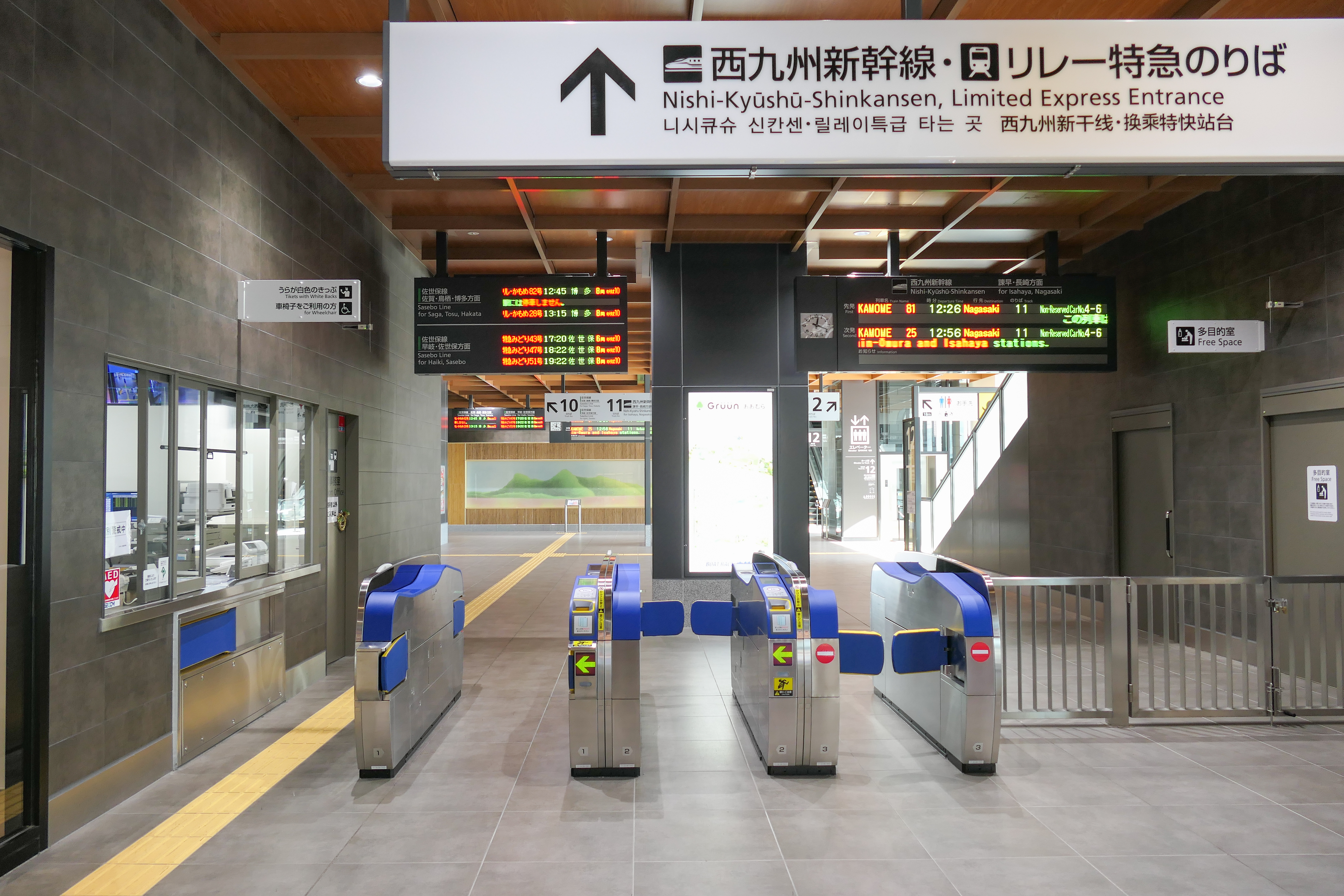
Shinkansen and Relay Kamome ticket gates, January 2023

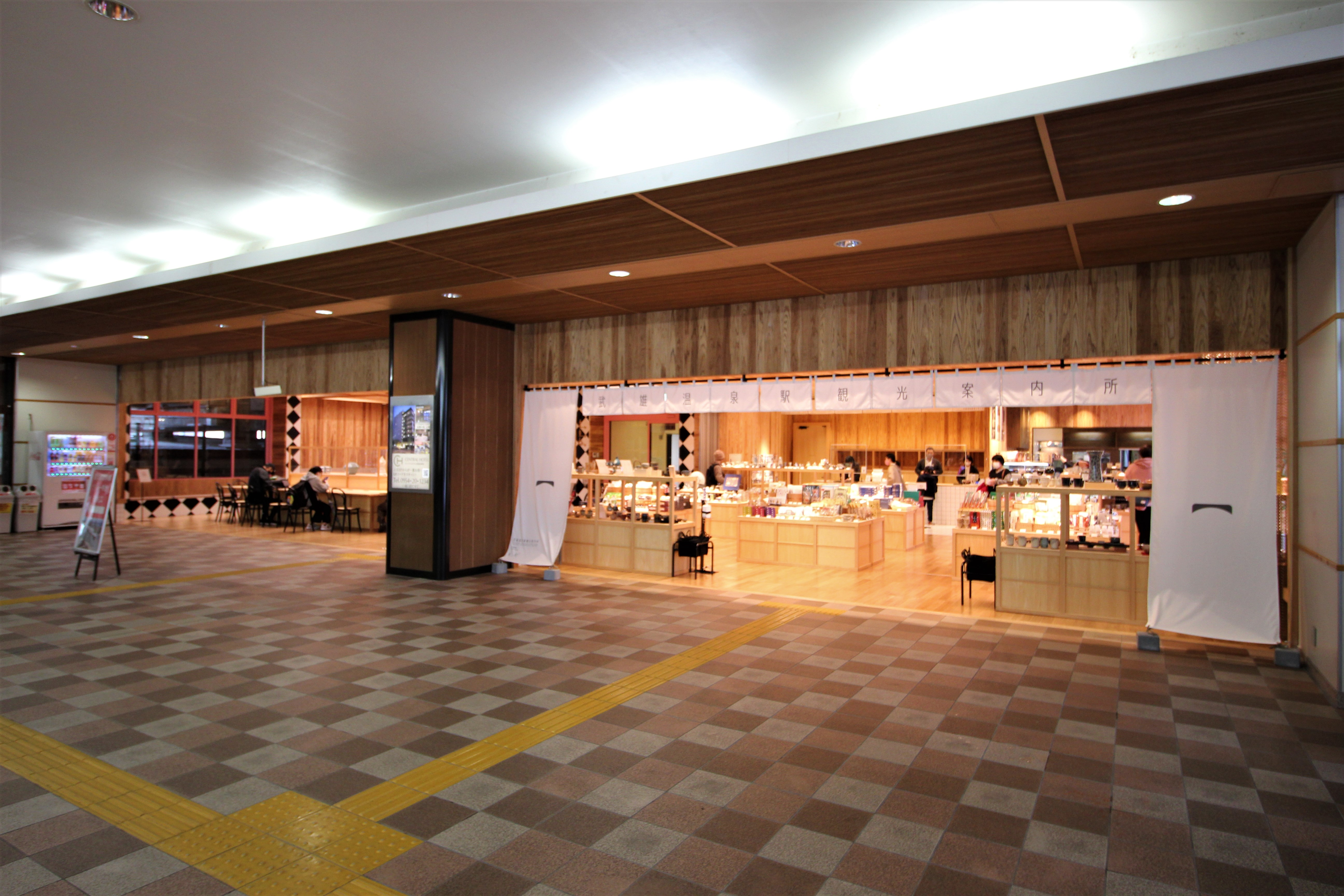
Takeo Tourist Information Centre

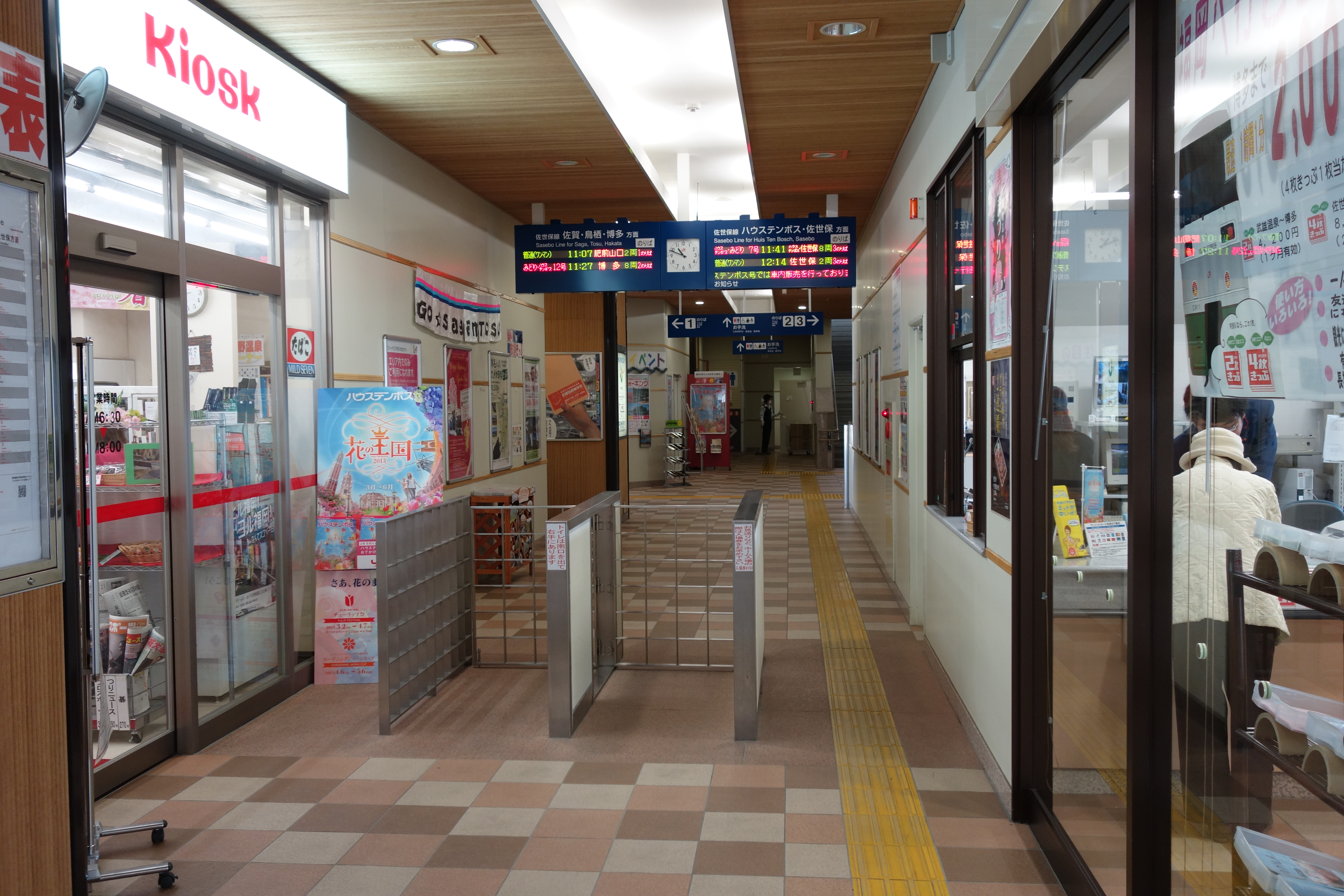
Entrance to tracks 1 and 2, with a shop (left) and ticket office (right).

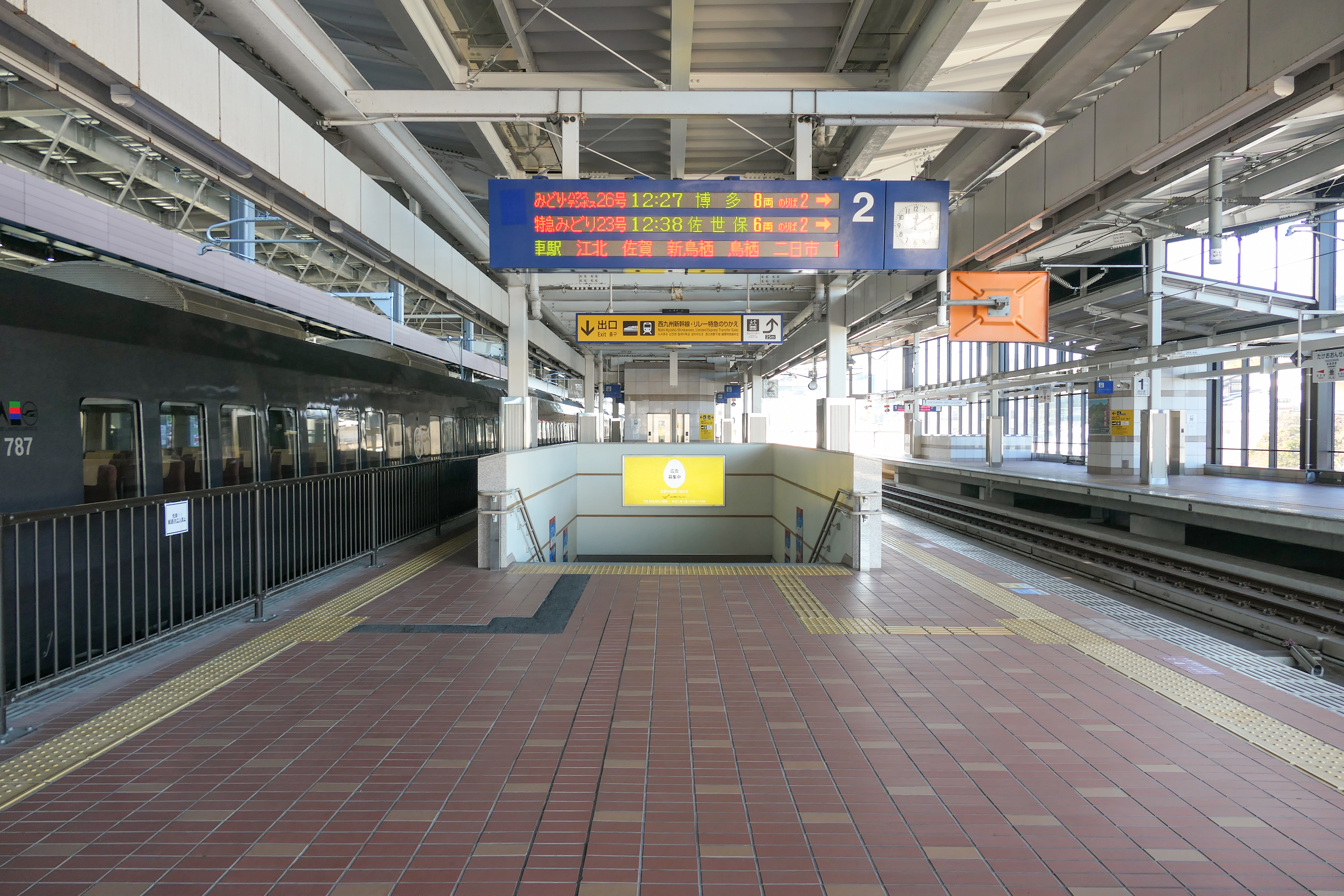
Track 2 with the gated Track 3 visible to the left and Track 1 to right

== History ==
The private Kyushu Railway had opened a track from Tosu to Saga on 20 August 1891. In the next phase of expansion, the track was extended westwards with Takeo-Onsen opening as the new western terminus on 5 May 1895 with the name Takeo. When the Kyushu Railway was nationalized on 1 July 1907, Japanese Government Railways (JGR) took over control of the station. On 12 October 1909, the station became part of the Nagasaki Main Line, which at that time, ran through Takeo and Haiki to Nagasaki. On 1 December 1934, another route was given the designation Nagasaki Main Line and the track serving Takeo was designated the Sasebo Line. On 19 June 1975, the station was renamed Takeo-Onsen. With the privatization of Japanese National Railways (JNR), the successor of JGR, on 1 April 1987, control of the station passed to JR Kyushu.

Work to elevate the station commenced in 1997. The south entrance of the station and the elevation of tracks 2 and 3 were completed in February 2008. The north entrance and the addition of one more platform (track 1) was completed the following year and the ceremony to mark the completion of the elevation project was held on 5 December 2009.

Takeo-Onsen Station was selected to serve as the temporary terminus of the Nishi Kyushu Shinkansen. On 26 March 2008, Minister of Land, Infrastructure, Transport and Tourism of Japan granted permission for the start of construction. The Shinkansen platforms were built on the south side of the station. Track 3 on the conventional line will serve as a direct transfer for passengers on the Shinkansen traveling to Hakata on the Relay Kamome until the completion of the route to Hakata. The line opened on 23 September 2022.

== Passenger statistics ==
In fiscal 2016, the station was used by an average of 1,728 passengers daily (boarding passengers only), and it ranked 106th among the busiest stations of JR Kyushu.

== See also ==
- List of railway stations in Japan
