= 787 series (JR Kyushu) =

Japanese train type

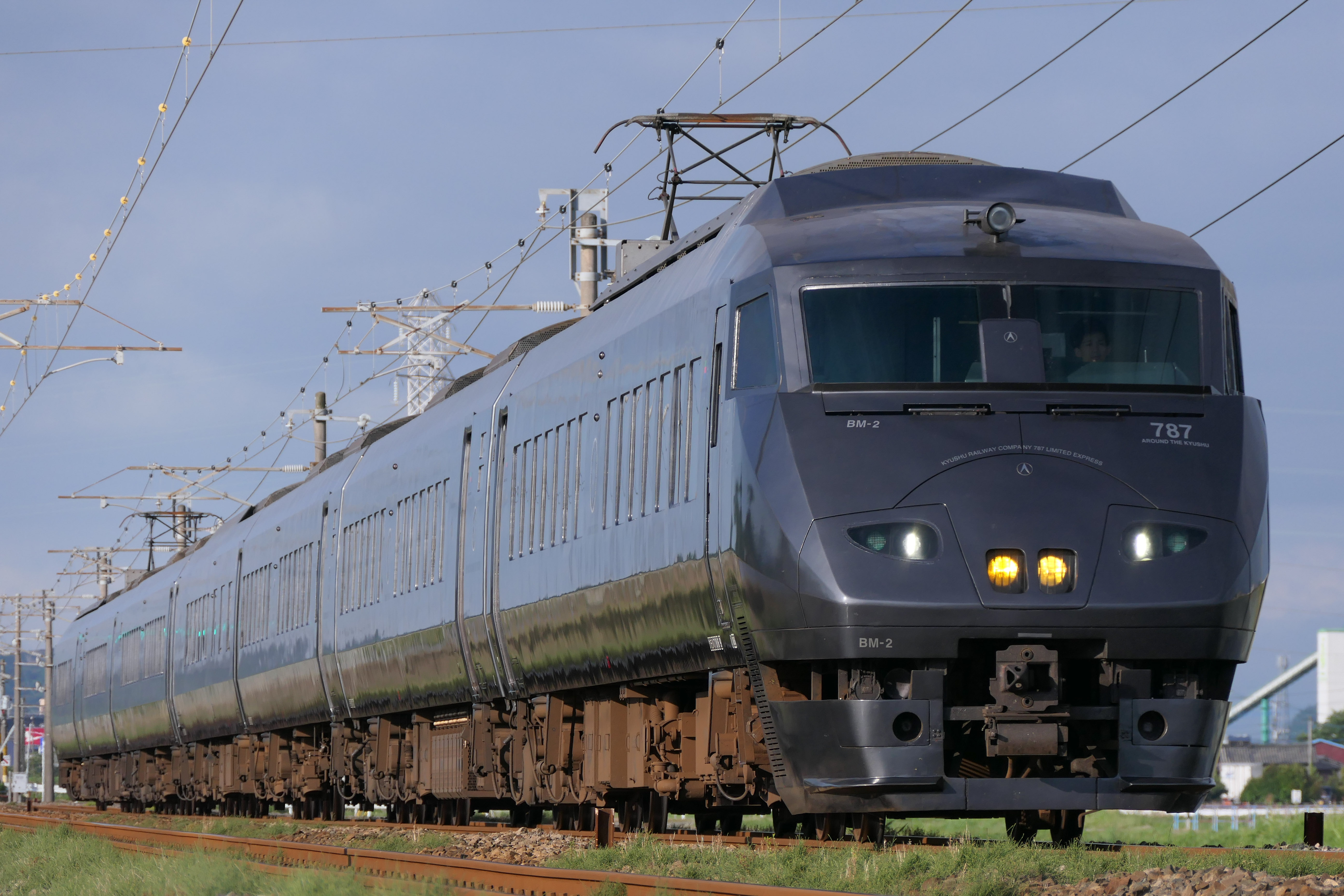
- 787 series set BM2 on the Kagoshima Main Line, June 2019
- In service: July 1992–present
- Manufacturers: Hitachi, Kinki Sharyo
- Built at: Kudamatsu, Higashiōsaka
- Replaced: 485 series
- Constructed: 1992–2002
- Number in service: 140 vehicles (26 sets)
- Formation: 4/6/7 cars per trainset
- Fleet numbers: BM1-15, BM101-111
- Operator: JR Kyushu
- Depots: Ōita, Minami-Fukuoka

Specifications
- Car body construction: Steel
- Car length: 21.2 m (69 ft 7 in) (end cars); 20 m (65 ft 7 in) (intermediate cars)
- Width: 2,944 mm (9 ft 7.9 in)
- Doors: 1 per side
- Maximum speed: 130 km/h (80 mph)
- Traction system: Thyristor drive
- Electric system: 20 kV AC 60 Hz
- Current collection: Overhead catenary
- Bogies: DT400K (powered), TR400K (trailer); DT901K (powered), TR901K (trailer) (prototype bogie)
- Safety system: ATS-SK
- Track gauge: 1,067 mm (3 ft 6 in)

Notes/references
- This train won the 36th Blue Ribbon Award in 1993.

The 787 series (787系) is an AC electric multiple unit type operated on limited express services by Kyushu Railway Company (JR Kyushu) in Japan since July 1992.

== Design ==
The trains were built jointly by Hitachi and Kinki Sharyo.

== Formations ==
=== 7-car sets (BM1–11, BM13–14) (2004–2011) ===
The 7-car sets are formed as follows.

Car No.	1	2	3	4	5	6	7
Designation	Msc	M'1	T1	T2	T	M	M'c
Numbering	KuMoRo 787	MoHa 786	SaHa 787-100	SaHa 787-200	SaHa 787	MoHa 787	KuMoHa 786

Cars 2 and 7 are each fitted with one PS400K scissors-type pantograph.

=== 6-car sets (BM1-14, BM115) ===
The two 6-car sets are formed as follows.

Car No.	1	2	3	4	5	6
Designation	Msc	M'1	T2	T	M	M'c
Numbering	KuMoRo 787	MoHa 786	SaHa 787-200	SaHa 787	MoHa 787	KuMoHa 786

Cars 2 and 6 are each fitted with one PS400K scissors-type pantograph.

=== 4-car sets (BM101–BM111) ===
The 11 4-car sets are formed as follows.

Car No.	1	2	3	4
Designation	Thsc	M	M'	Tc
Numbering	KuRoHa 786	MoHa 787	MoHa 786	KuHa 787

Car 3 is fitted with one PS400K scissors-type pantograph.

== Operations ==
As of January 2026, the 787 series are used on the following limited express services.

- Ariake
- Kirameki
- Kaiō
- Midori
- Nichirin
- Hyuga
- Kirishima
- Relay Kamome
- Sendai Express

=== Former operations ===
- Tsubame (2004–2011)

From the start of the revised timetable on 12 March 2011, with the completion of the Kyushu Shinkansen, 787 series sets were no longer used on Relay Tsubame services. The T1 (SaHa 787) cars were removed from the 7-car sets to form a fleet of 15 6-car sets. These were redeployed on Kamome services, displacing the earlier 783 series EMUs.

== Joyful Train sets ==
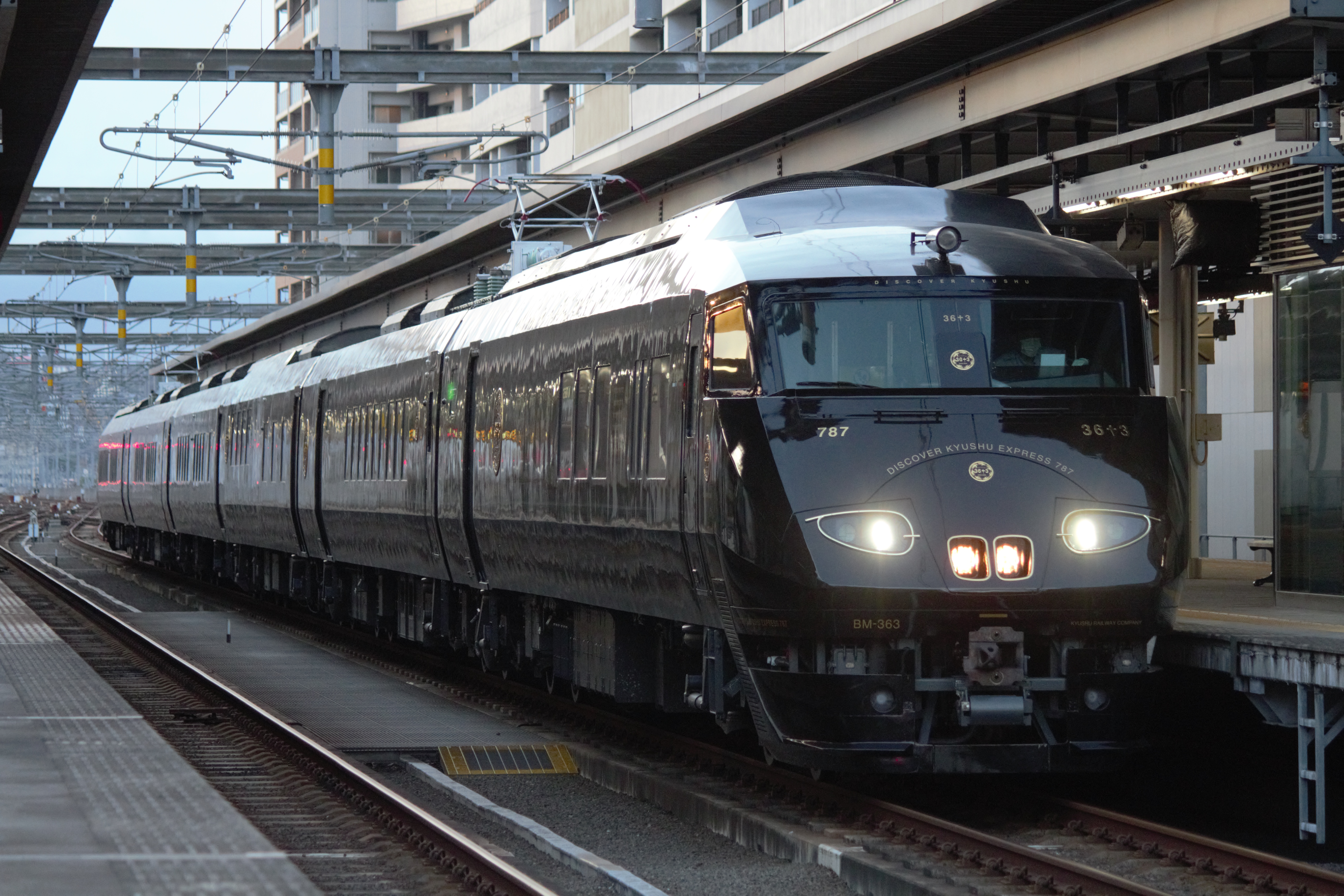
36 + 3 in October 2020

- 36 + 3: A modified six-car set, which had been planned for service to begin on 15 October 2020, is based at Minami-Fukuoka Depot.

== History ==
All cars were made no-smoking from the start of the revised timetable on 18 March 2007.

== See also ==
Media related to JR Kyushu 787 at Wikimedia Commons
