= Kirishima =

Kirishima (霧島) is a Japanese surname. It may refer to:

== People with the name ==
- Kirishima Kazuhiro (born 1959), Japanese sumo wrestler
- Reika Kirishima (born 1972), Japanese actress
- Satoshi Kirishima (1954–2024), Japanese anarchist and terrorist
- Kirishima Tetsuo (born 1996), Mongolian sumo wrestler

=== Fictional characters ===
- Eijiro Kirishima, a character from the manga/anime series My Hero Academia
- Touka Kirishima and her brother Ayato Kirishima, characters from the manga/anime series Tokyo Ghoul
- Kanna Kirishima, a character from the video game series Sakura Wars

== Other uses ==
- Kirishima, Kagoshima, a city in Kagoshima Prefecture, Kyūshū, Japan
- Kirishima, Kagoshima (town), a town in Kagoshima Prefecture, Japan
- Kirishima-Yaku National Park, a Japanese national park in both Miyazaki and Kagoshima Prefectures on the island of Kyūshū
- Mount Kirishima, a highly active volcano in Kagoshima Prefecture
- Japanese battleship Kirishima, a battleship of the Imperial Japanese Navy, commissioned in 1915 and named after the volcano
- JDS Kirishima, a destroyer of the Japan Maritime Self-Defense Force commissioned in 1995
- Kirishima (train), a train service in Japan
