= Nichirin =

Japanese limited express train service

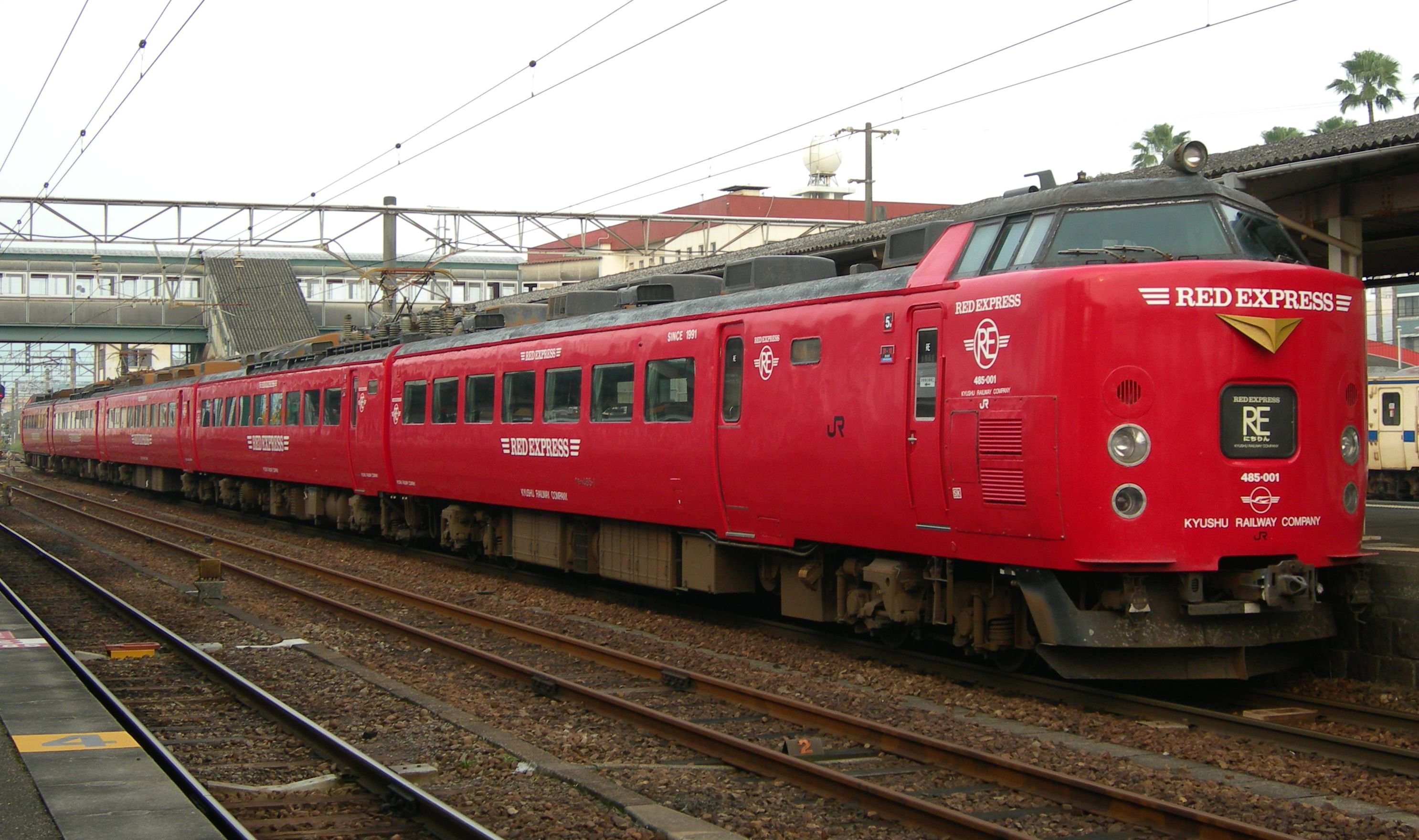
- 485 series EMU on a Nichirin service

Overview
- Service type: Limited express
- First service: 1968
- Current operator: JR Kyushu

Route
- Lines used: Miyazaki Airport Line, Nichinan Line, Nippo Main Line, Kagoshima Main Line

Technical
- Rolling stock: 783 series, 787 series EMUs

The Nichirin (にちりん) and Nichirin Sea Gaia (にちりんシーガイア) are limited express train services in Japan operated by JR Kyushu which run from Miyazaki Airport station to Oita. The Sea Gaia service continues on to Beppu and Hakata.

Prior to the opening of the completed Kyushu Shinkansen, the Dream Nichirin overnight train service ran from Hakata and Miyazaki Airport. It was discontinued along with the start of the revised timetable on March 12, 2011.

In 2013, JR Kyushu launched an excursion train, Seven Stars in Kyushu, which offers occasional overnight service to Miyazaki as part of a longer tour.
