= 783 series =

Japanese train type

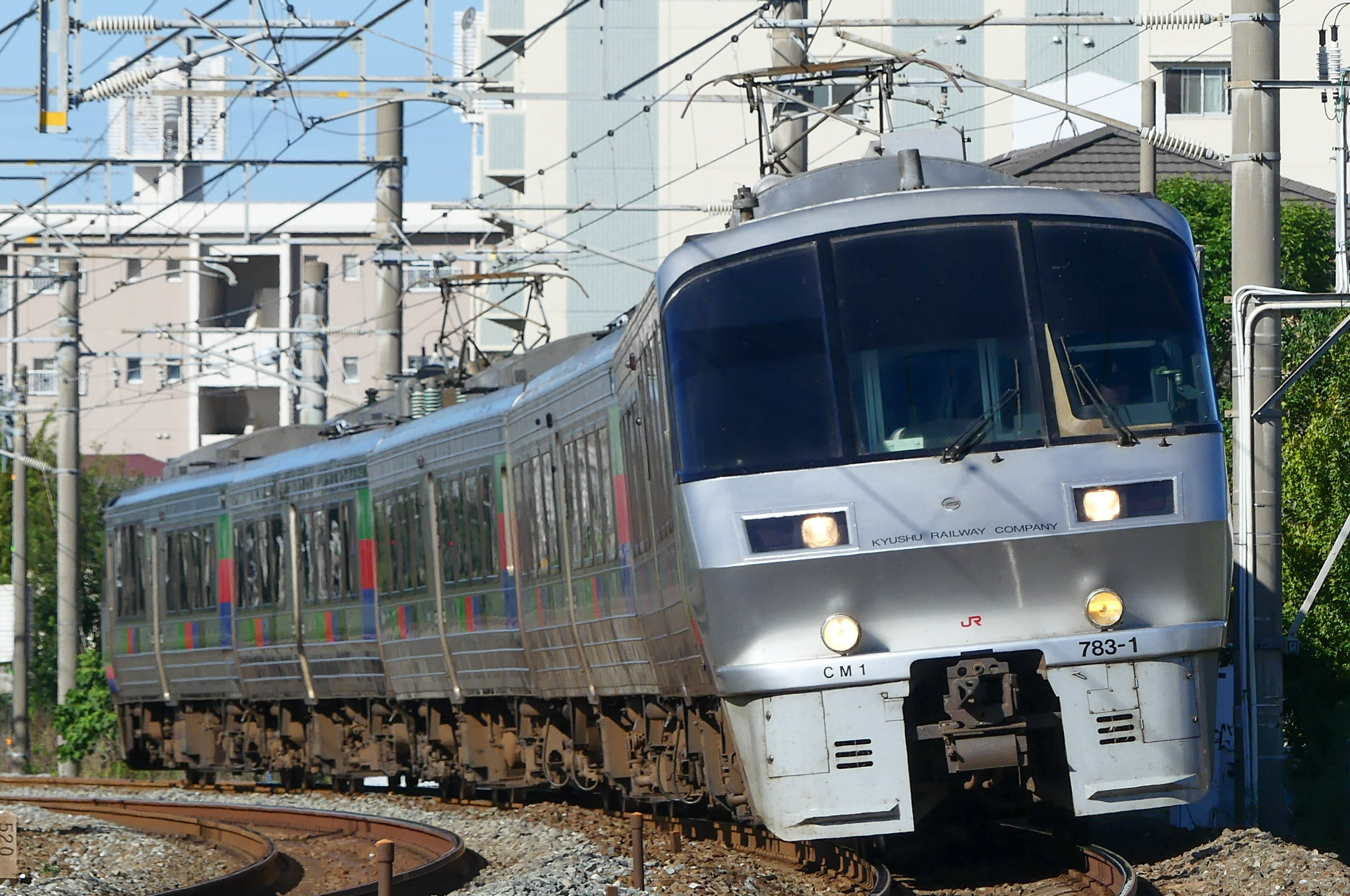
- Set CM1, August 2017
- In service: March 1988–Present
- Manufacturers: JR Kyushu Kokura Works, Hitachi, Kinki Sharyo
- Family name: Hyper Saloon
- Constructed: 1988–1991
- Refurbished: 1994–2006
- Number built: 90 vehicles
- Number in service: 86 vehicles (20 sets)
- Number scrapped: 4 vehicles
- Formation: 4/5 cars per trainset
- Fleet numbers: CM1-5, CM11-15, CM21-25, CM31-35
- Operator: JR Kyushu
- Depot: Minami-Fukuoka

Specifications
- Car body construction: Stainless steel
- Car length: 21.05 m (69 ft 1 in) (end cars); 20 m (65 ft 7 in) (intermediate cars)
- Width: 2,950 mm (116 in)
- Doors: 1 per side
- Maximum speed: 130 km/h (80 mph)
- Traction system: Thyristor drive
- Electric system: 20 kV AC 60 Hz
- Current collection: Overhead catenary
- Safety systems: ATS-SK, ATS-Dk
- Track gauge: 1,067 mm (3 ft 6 in)

The 783 series (783系) is an AC electric multiple unit train type operated on limited express services by Kyushu Railway Company (JR Kyushu) in Japan since March 1988.

== Design ==
The trains were built jointly by Hitachi, Kinki Sharyo, and JR Kyushu (at its Kokura factory).

== Formations ==
=== 5-car Kamome sets (CM1–5) ===
The 5-car sets used on Kamome services are formed as follows.

Car No.	1	2	3	4	5
Designation	Thsc	M'1	T0	M2	Mc
Numbering	KuRoHa 782	MoHa 783	SaHa 783	MoHa 783-100	KuMoHa 783

Cars 2 and 5 are each fitted with one scissors-type pantograph.

=== 4-car Midori sets (CM11–15) ===
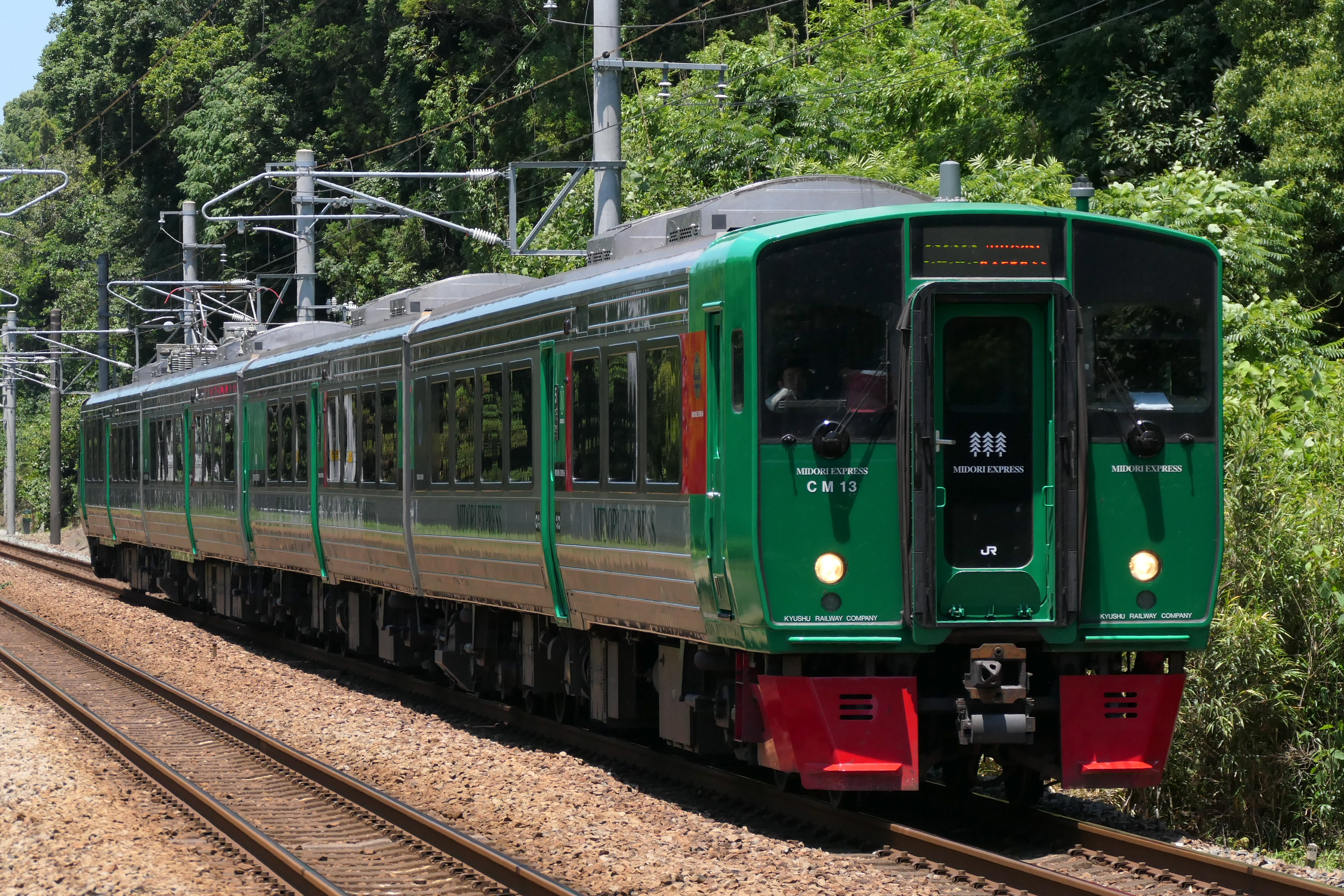
Set CM13 on a Midori service, June 2019

The 4-car sets used on Midori services are formed as follows.

Car No.	11	12	13	14
Designation	Thsc	T2	M2	Mc
Numbering	KuRoHa 782-100	SaHa 783-200	MoHa 783-100	KuMoHa 783

Car 14 is fitted with one scissors-type pantograph.

=== 4-car Huis Ten Bosch sets (CM21–25) ===
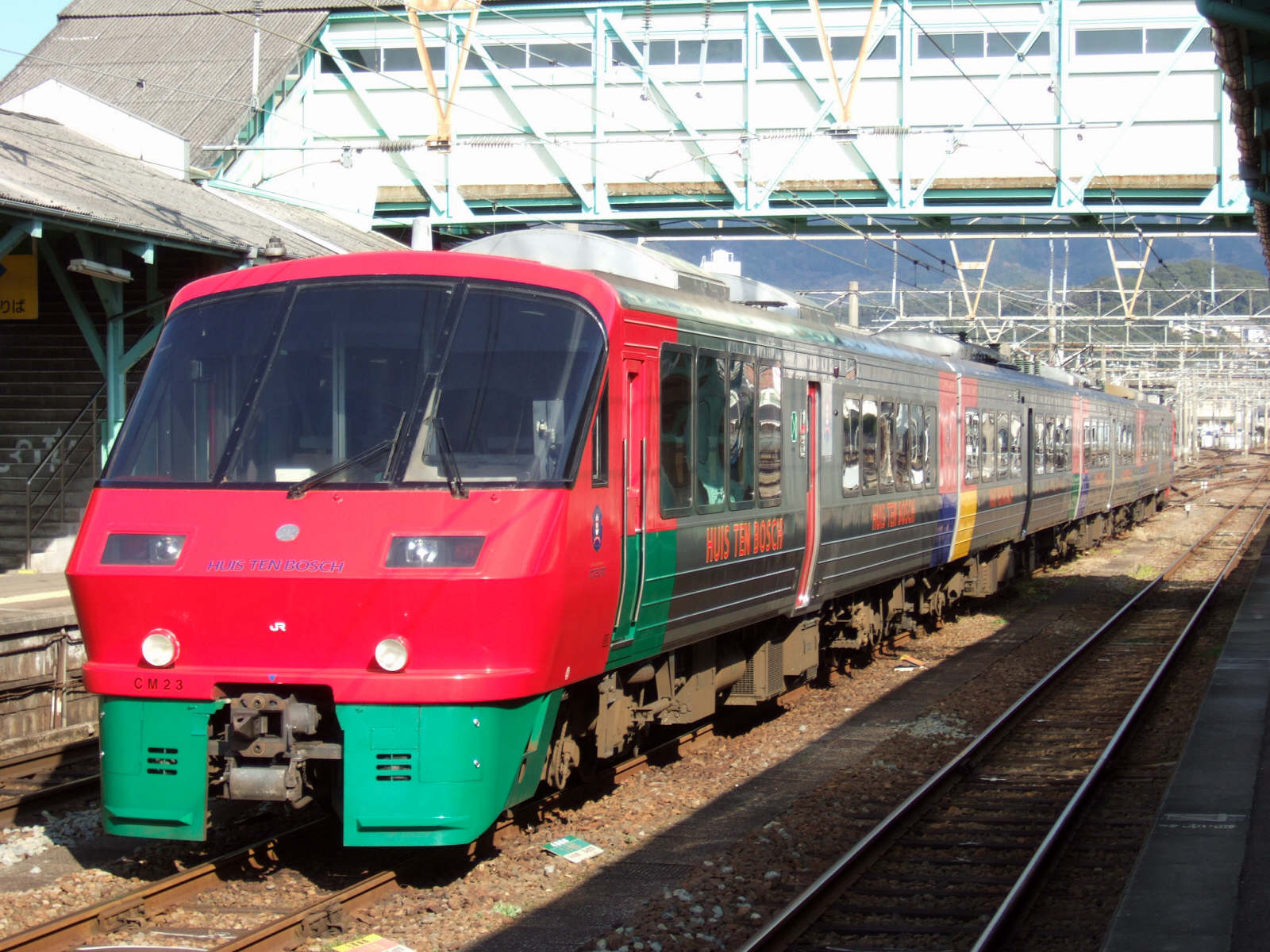
Huis Ten Bosch 4-car set, January 2007

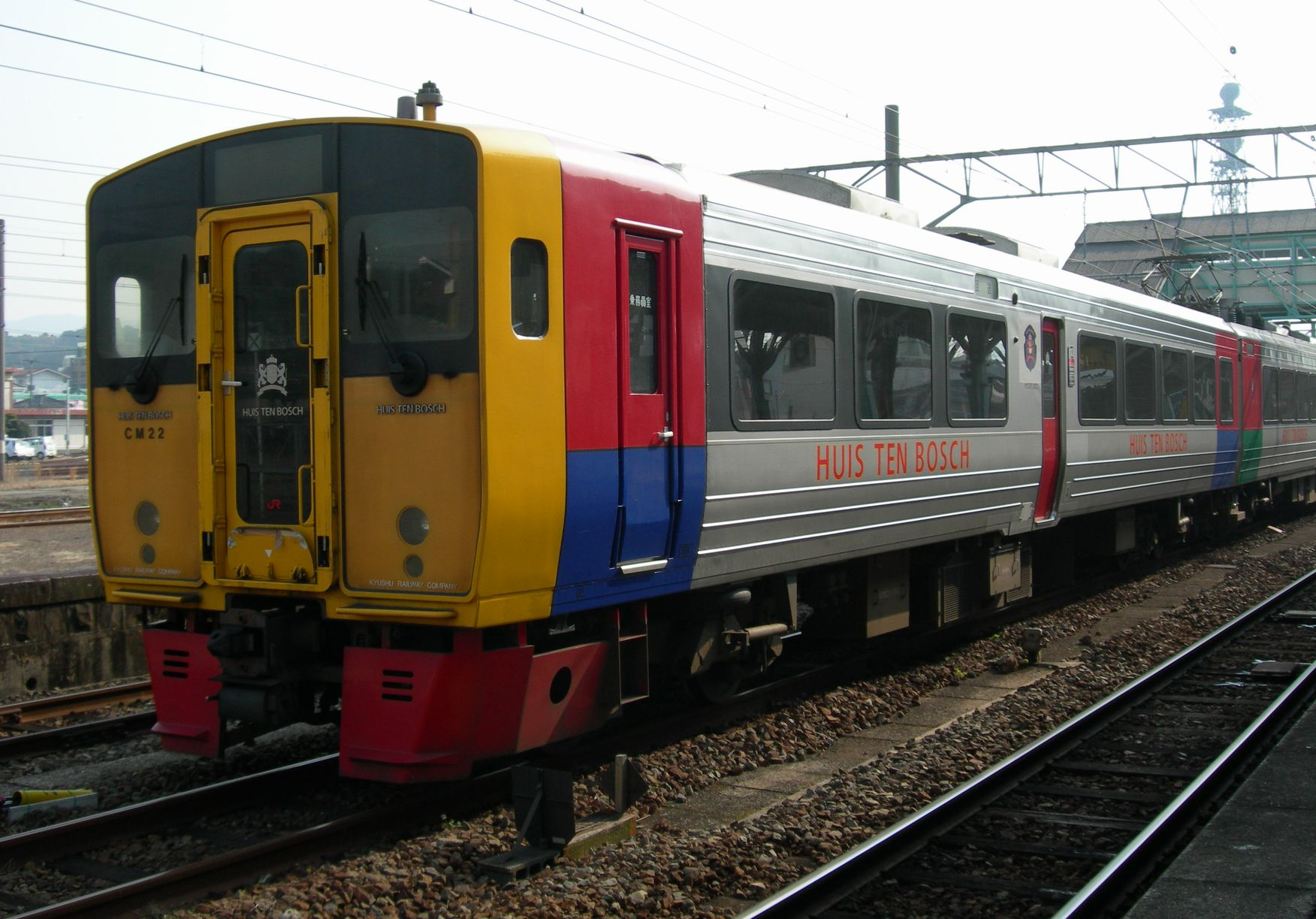
Modified KuHa 783-100 car of a Huis Ten Bosch 4-car set, January 2008

The 4-car sets used on Huis Ten Bosch services are formed as follows.

Car No.	7	8	9	10
Designation	Thsc	M2	M1	Tc1
Numbering	KuRoHa 782-500	MoHa 783-300	MoHa 783-200	KuHa 783-100

Car 9 is fitted with one scissors-type pantograph.

=== 5-car Nichirin sets (CM31–35) ===
The 5-car sets used on Nichirin services are formed as follows.

Car No.	1	2	3	4	5
Designation	Thsc	M1	T2	M2	Mc
Numbering	KuRoHa 782-500	MoHa 783	SaHa 783-200	MoHa 783-100	KuMoHa 783

Cars 2 and 5 are each fitted with one scissors-type pantograph.

Set CM35 normally operates as a 4-car set.

== Past formations ==
The following formations were used from introduction in 1988 until the fleet was refurbished and reformed in 2000.

=== 9-car sets ===
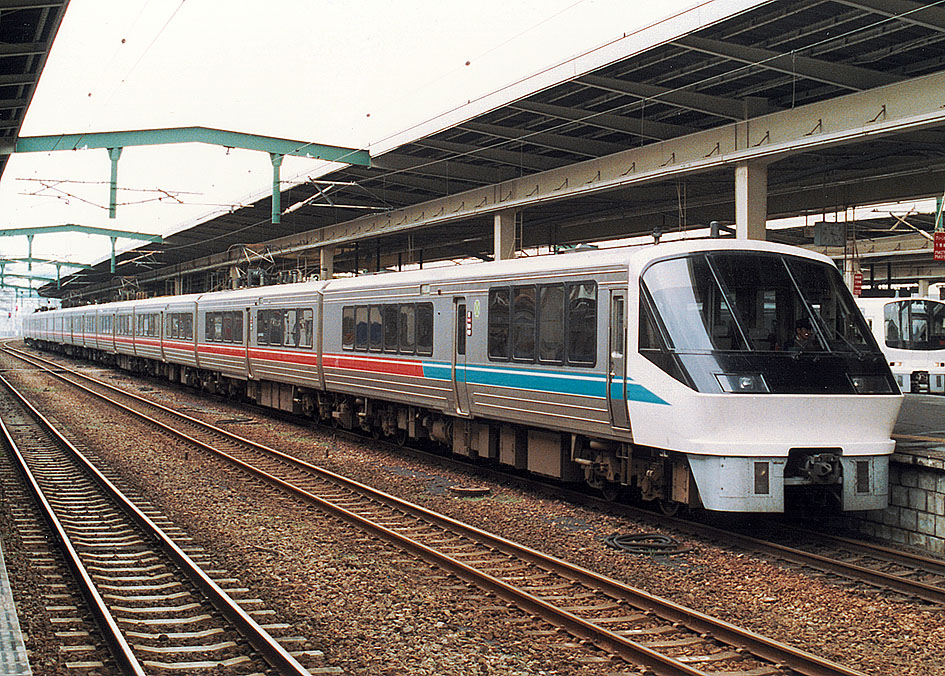
783 series set in original livery on a Kamome service, 1992

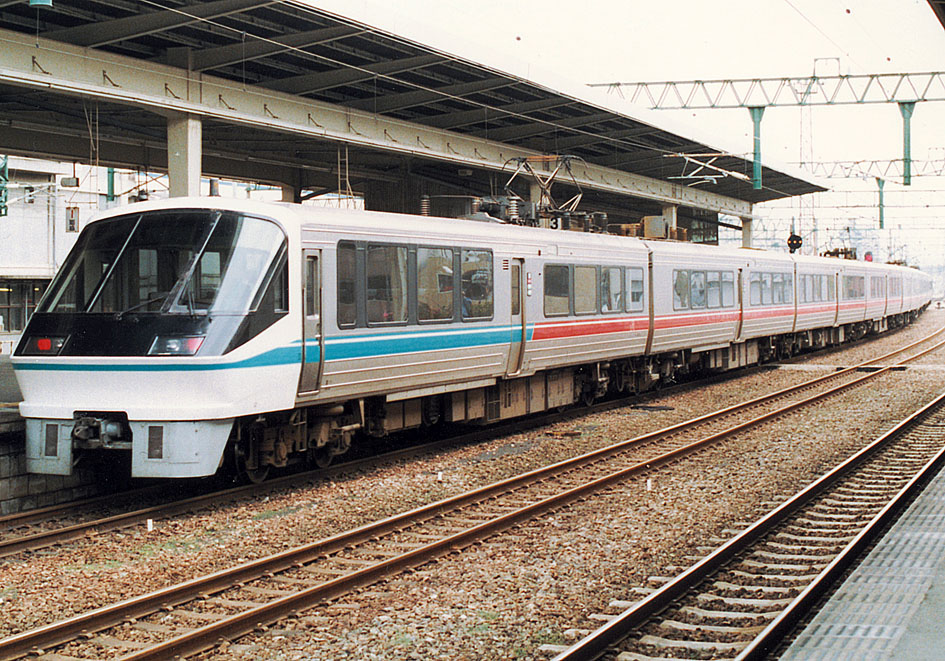
783 series set on a Kamome service in modified livery with the blue stripe extended beneath the cab windscreen, 1992

- 9-car sets used on Hyper Kamome services from March 1990 until June 1994

Car No.	1	2	3	4	5	6	7	8	9
Numbering	KuRo 782	MoHa 783	SaHa 783-100	MoHa 783	SaHa 783-200	MoHa 783	SaHa 783-100	MoHa 783-100	KuMoHa 783

Cars 2, 4, 6, and 9 were each fitted with one scissors-type pantograph.

=== 8-car sets ===
- 8-car sets used on Hyper Kamome services from March 1990 until June 1994

Car No.	1	2	3	4	5	6	7	8
Numbering	KuRo 782	SaHa 783-100	MoHa 783	SaHa 783-200	MoHa 783	SaHa 783-100	MoHa 783-100	KuMoHa 783

Cars 3, 5, and 8 were each fitted with one scissors-type pantograph.

=== 7-car sets ===
- 7-car sets used on Ariake and Hyper Ariake services during busy seasons from 1 April 1988

Car No.	1	2	3	4	5	6	7
Numbering	KuRo 782	MoHa 783	SaHa 783	MoHa 783	SaHa 783	MoHa 783-100	KuMoHa 783

Cars 2, 4, and 7 were each fitted with one scissors-type pantograph.

- 7-car sets used on Hyper Kamome services from 18 March 1993

Car No.	1	2	3	4	5	6	7
Numbering	KuRo 782	MoHa 783	SaHa 783-200	MoHa 783	SaHa 783-100	MoHa 783-100	KuMoHa 783

Cars 2, 4, and 7 were each fitted with one scissors-type pantograph.

=== 6-car sets ===
- 6-car sets used on Hyper Nichirin services from 18 March 1993

Car No.	1	2	3	4	5	6
Numbering	KuRoHa 782	SaHa 783	MoHa 783	SaHa 783-100	MoHa 783-100	KuMoHa 783

Cars 3 and 6 were each fitted with one scissors-type pantograph.

=== 5-car sets ===
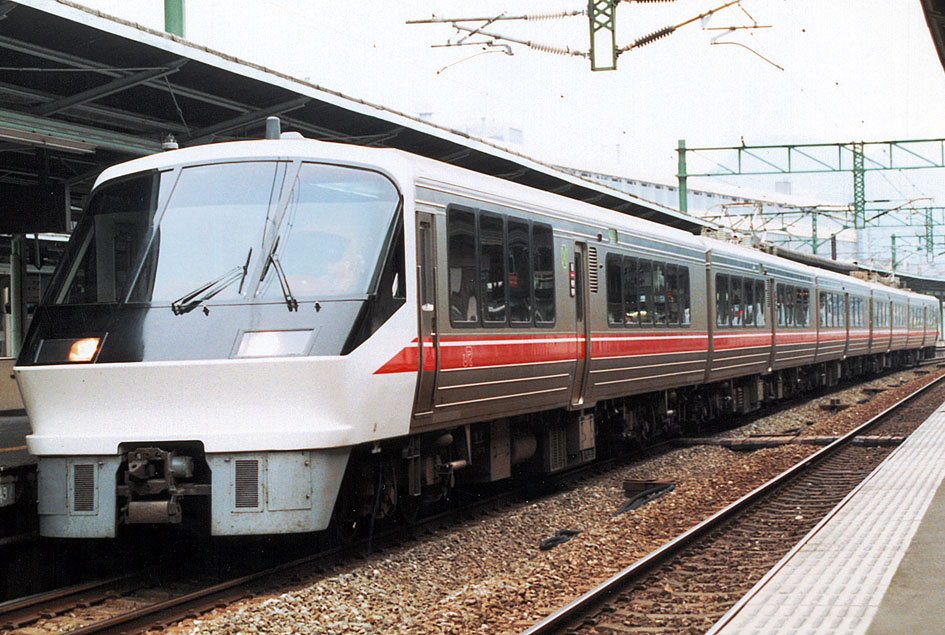
5-car 783 series set on an Ariake service, 1992

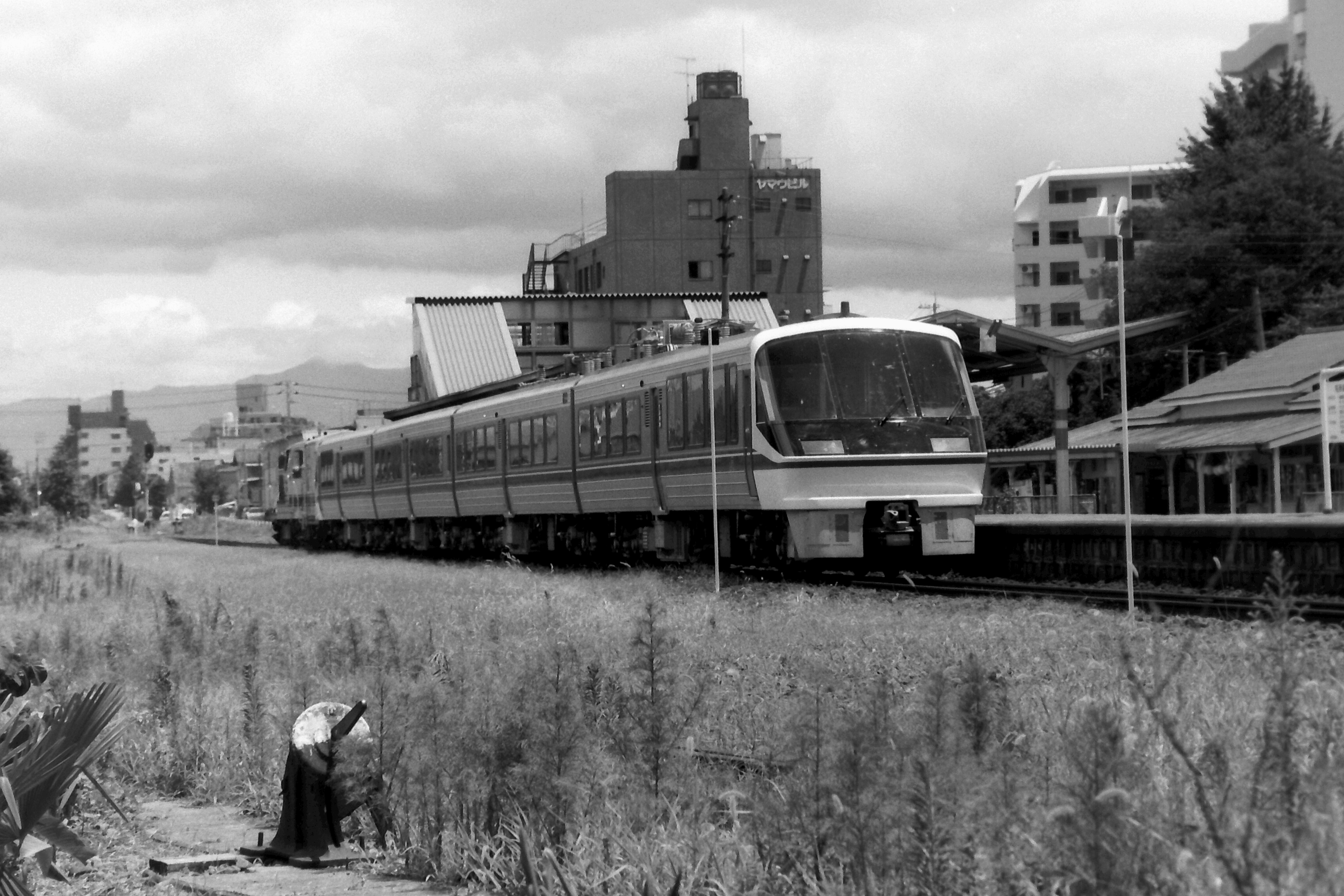
783 series EMU hauled by a dedicated DE10 diesel locomotive and Yo 28000 generator van on Ariake services over non-electrified sections

- 5-car sets used on Ariake and Super Ariake services from 1 April 1988

Car No.	1	2	3	4	5
Numbering	KuRo 782	MoHa 783	SaHa 783	MoHa 783-100	KuMoHa 783

Cars 2, and 5 were each fitted with one scissors-type pantograph.

- 5-car sets used on Hyper Ariake services from March 1990 until July 1992 and on Tsubame services from 15 July 1992

Car No.	1	2	3	4	5
Numbering	KuRo 782	MoHa 783	SaHa 783-200	MoHa 783-100	KuMoHa 783

Cars 2, and 5 were each fitted with one scissors-type pantograph.

=== 4-car sets ===
- 4-car sets used on Hyper Ariake services from March 1990 until July 1992 and on Ariake and Hyper Nichirin services from 15 July 1992

Car No.	1	2	3	4
Numbering	KuRoHa 782	SaHa 783	MoHa 783-100	KuMoHa 783

Car 5 was fitted with one scissors-type pantograph.

=== 3-car sets ===
3-car sets used on Ariake and Super Ariake services from 1 April 1988 until 1990

Car No.	1	2	3
Numbering	KuRoHa 782	MoHa 783-100	KuMoHa 783

Car 3 was fitted with one scissors-type pantograph.

== History ==
The 783 series trains were first introduced from 13 March 1988, initially branded as "Hyper Saloon".

On 30 May 1989, the 783 series design was awarded the 1988 Laurel Prize by the Japan Railfan Club. A special award ceremony was held at platform 1 of Hakata Station on 26 August 1989.

All cars were made no-smoking from the start of the revised timetable on 18 March 2007.
