= Seven Stars in Kyushu =

Japanese deluxe sleeper excursion train

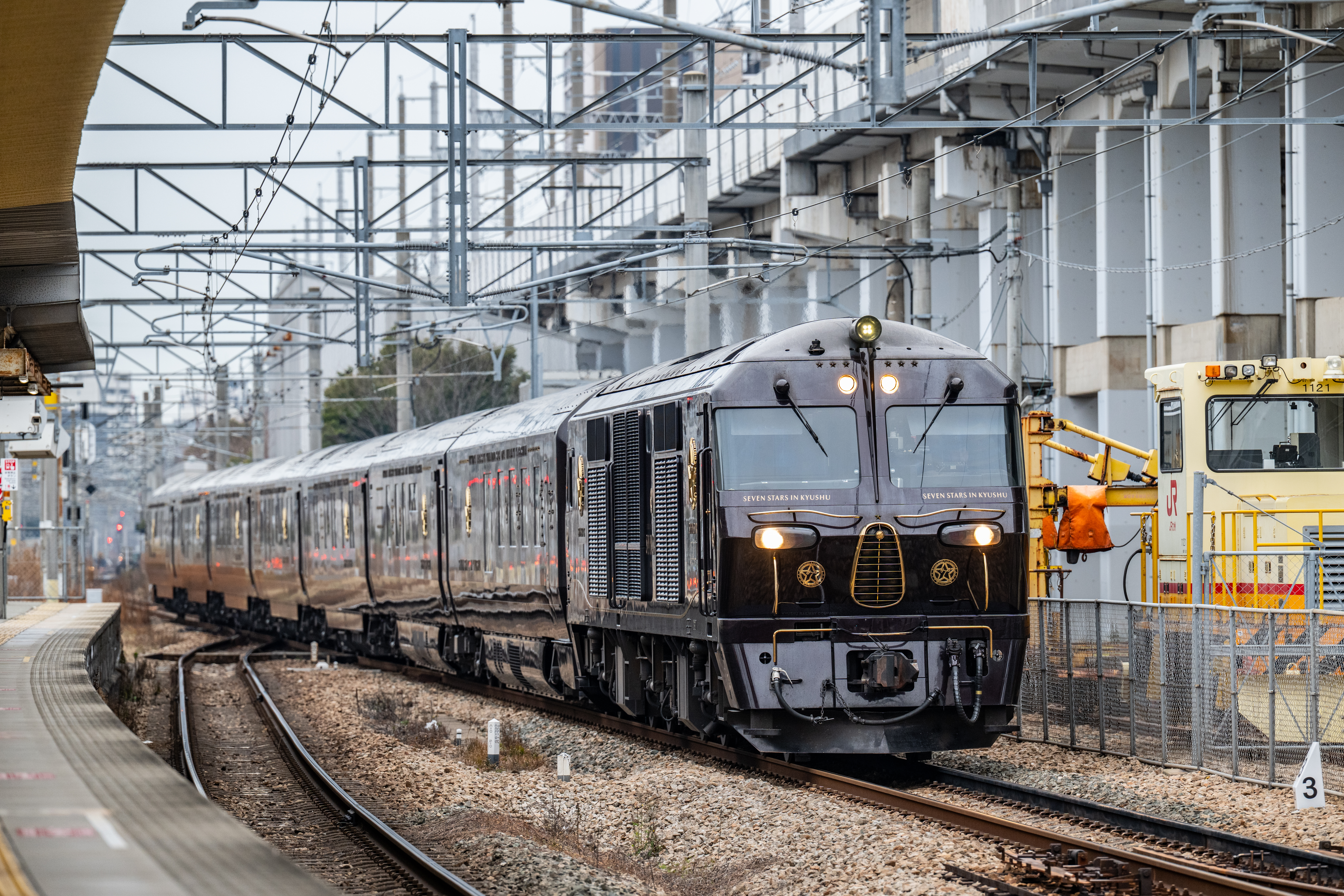
- The Seven Stars in Kyushu in February 2025, hauled by a JR Kyushu Class DF200 diesel-electric locomotive

Overview
- Service type: Excursion train
- Status: Operational
- Locale: Kyushu
- First service: 15 October 2013
- Current operator(s): JR Kyushu

Route
- Termini: Hakata; Hakata (loop)

On-board services
- Seating arrangements: Lounge car
- Sleeping arrangements: 2-person suites
- Catering facilities: Dining car
- Observation facilities: Observation car at end of train

Technical
- Rolling stock: 77 series coaches
- Track gauge: 1,067 mm (3 ft 6 in)
- Electrification: Diesel-hauled
- Operating speed: 100 km/h (60 mph)

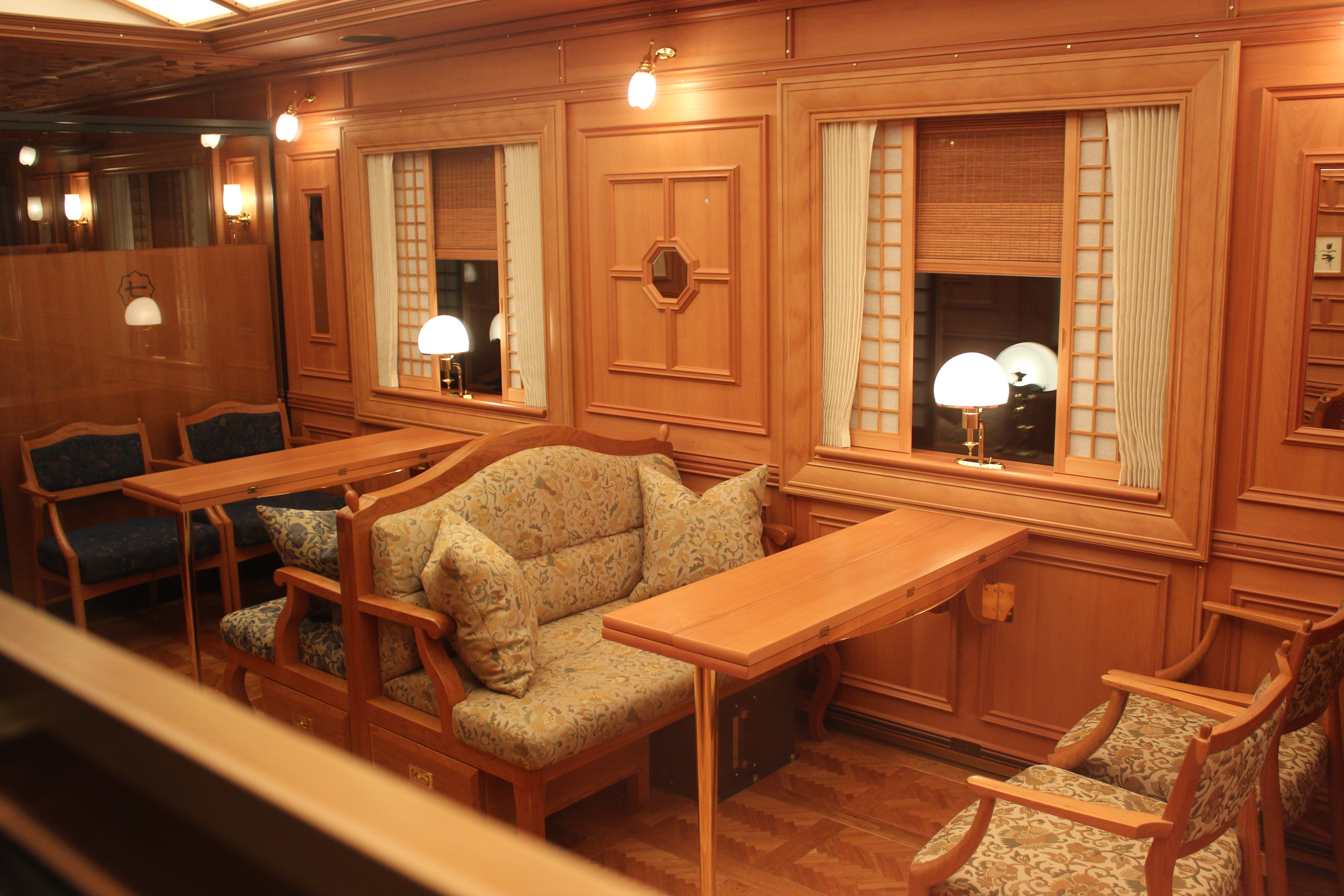
Dining space in MaShiFu 77-7002 (car 2)

The Seven Stars in Kyushu (ななつ星ｉｎ九州, Nanatsuboshi in Kyūshū) is a deluxe sleeping car excursion train operated by Kyushu Railway Company (JR Kyushu) in Japan since October 2013.

== Design ==
The overall design concept of the train was overseen by industrial designer Eiji Mitooka. The name of the train is derived from the seven prefectures of Kyushu and the fact that the train is made up of seven coaches.

The dedicated diesel locomotive, DF200-7000, for the train was built by Kawasaki Heavy Industries in Kobe, based on the JR Freight Class DF200 locomotive, modified for use in Kyushu and finished in a livery of deep maroon. It was completed in July 2013. The coaches are based on the 817 series EMU body design and are mounted on 787 series EMU bogies. Manufacture of the passenger coaches was split between Hitachi in Kudamatsu, Yamaguchi, and JR Kyushu's Kokura Works in Kitakyushu.

== Train formation ==
The train consists of the DF200-7000 locomotive and seven coaches: five sleeping cars, a lounge car, and a dining car, with a total capacity of 28 passengers. The rear car of the train features two deluxe suites with observation windows at the end. All suites have their own toilets and shower facilities, designed in porcelain by the late Sakaida Kakiemon XIV. The total cost of building the train was approximately 3 billion yen.

The train is formed as follows.

Car No.	Running No.	Type	Manufacturer	Weight (t)	Facilities
1	MaI 77-7001	Lounge car	JR Kyushu	45.3	with piano, bar counter and observation area
2	MaShiFu 77-7002	Dining car	JR Kyushu	45.2	with toilets
3	MaINe 77-7003	Sleeping car	JR Kyushu	45.4	3 suites, shower room
4	MaINe 77-7004	Sleeping car	Hitachi	44.3	3 suites, toilets
5	MaINe 77-7005	Sleeping car	Hitachi	44.3	3 suites
6	MaINe 77-7006	Sleeping car	Hitachi	44.2	3 suites, toilets
7	MaINeFu 77-7007	Sleeping car	Hitachi	45.1	2 deluxe suites, mini kitchen, crew room

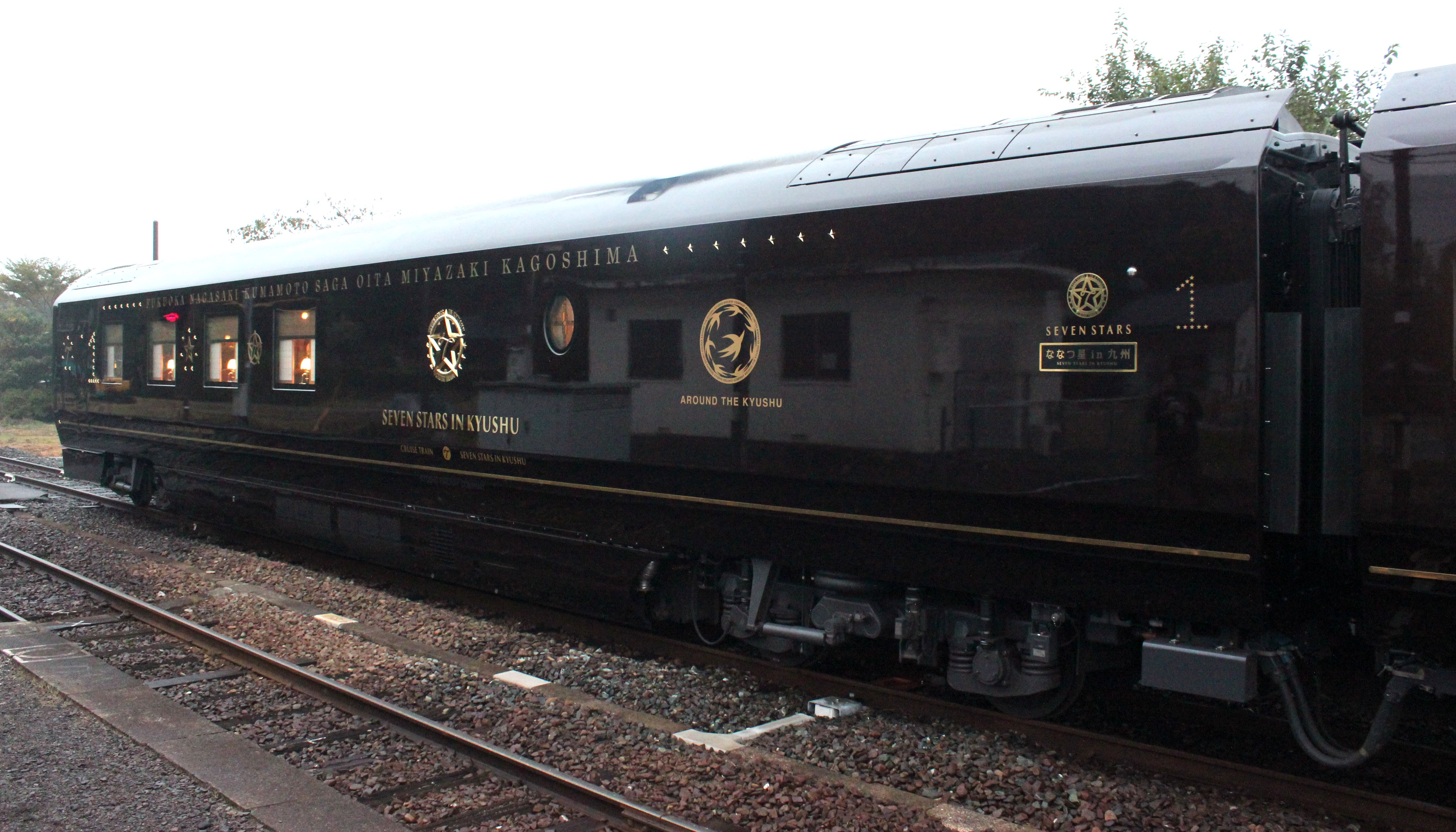
MaI 77-7001 (car 1)

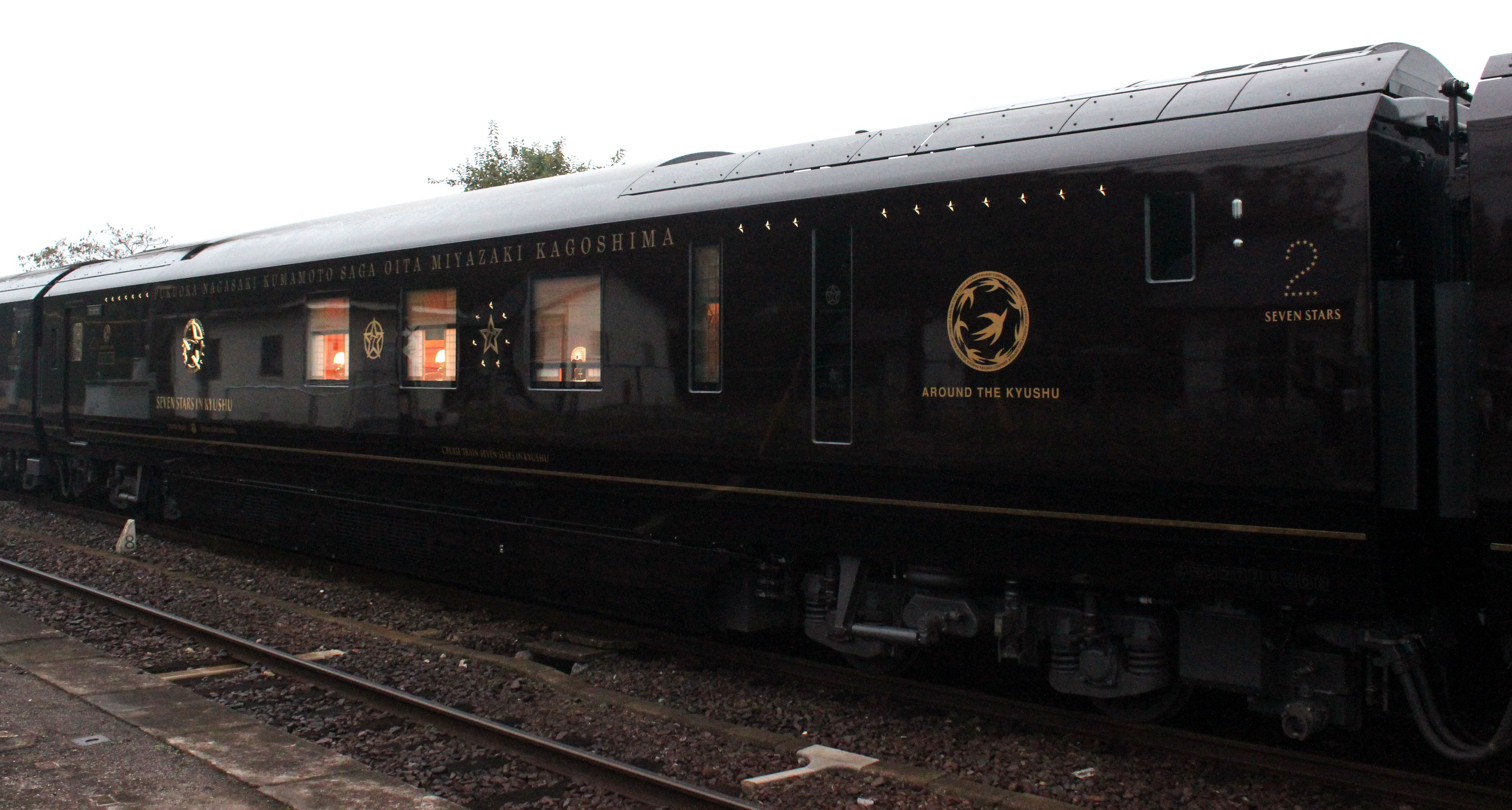
MaShiFu 77-7002 (car 2)

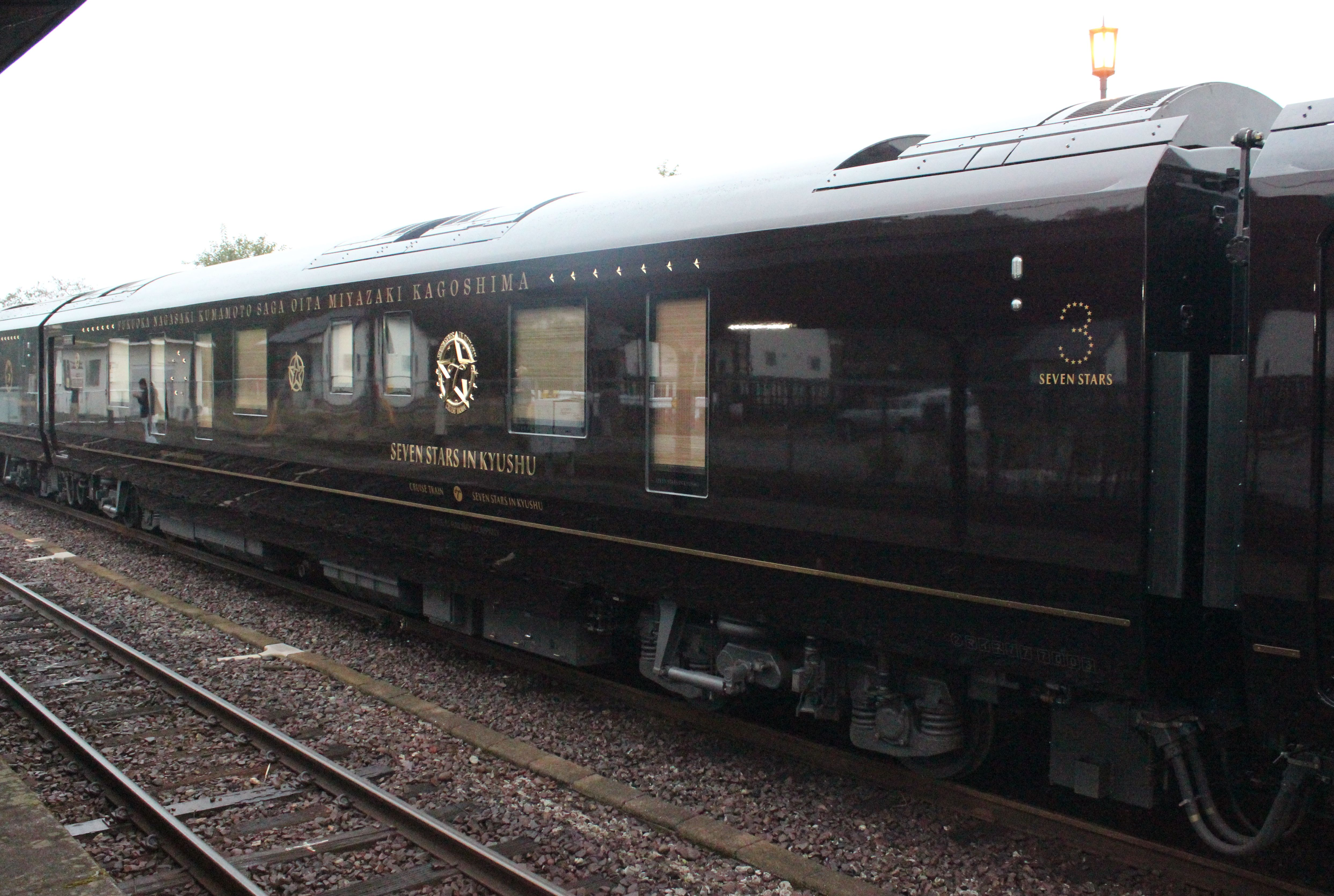
MaINe 77-7003 (car 3)

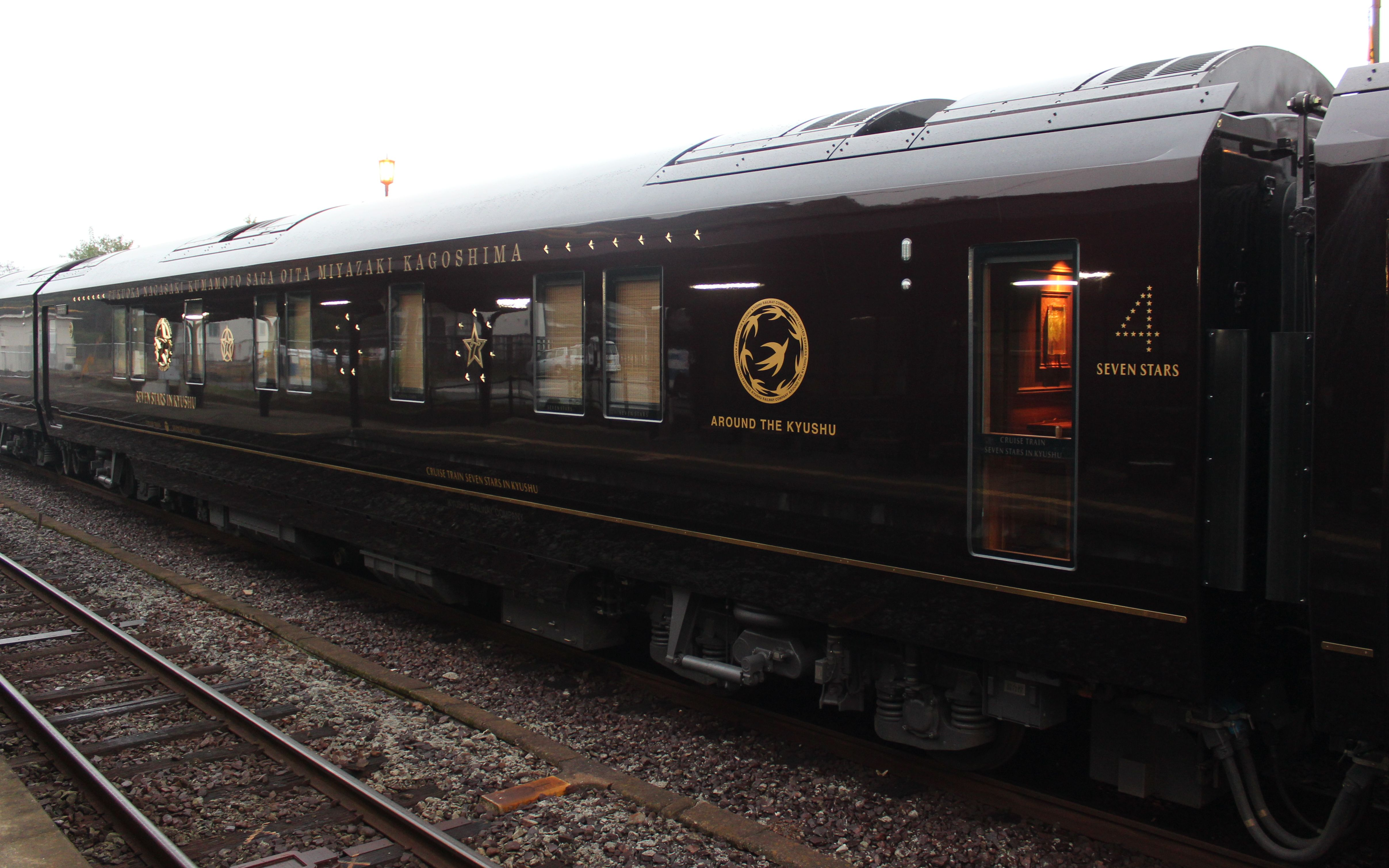
MaINe 77-7004 (car 4)

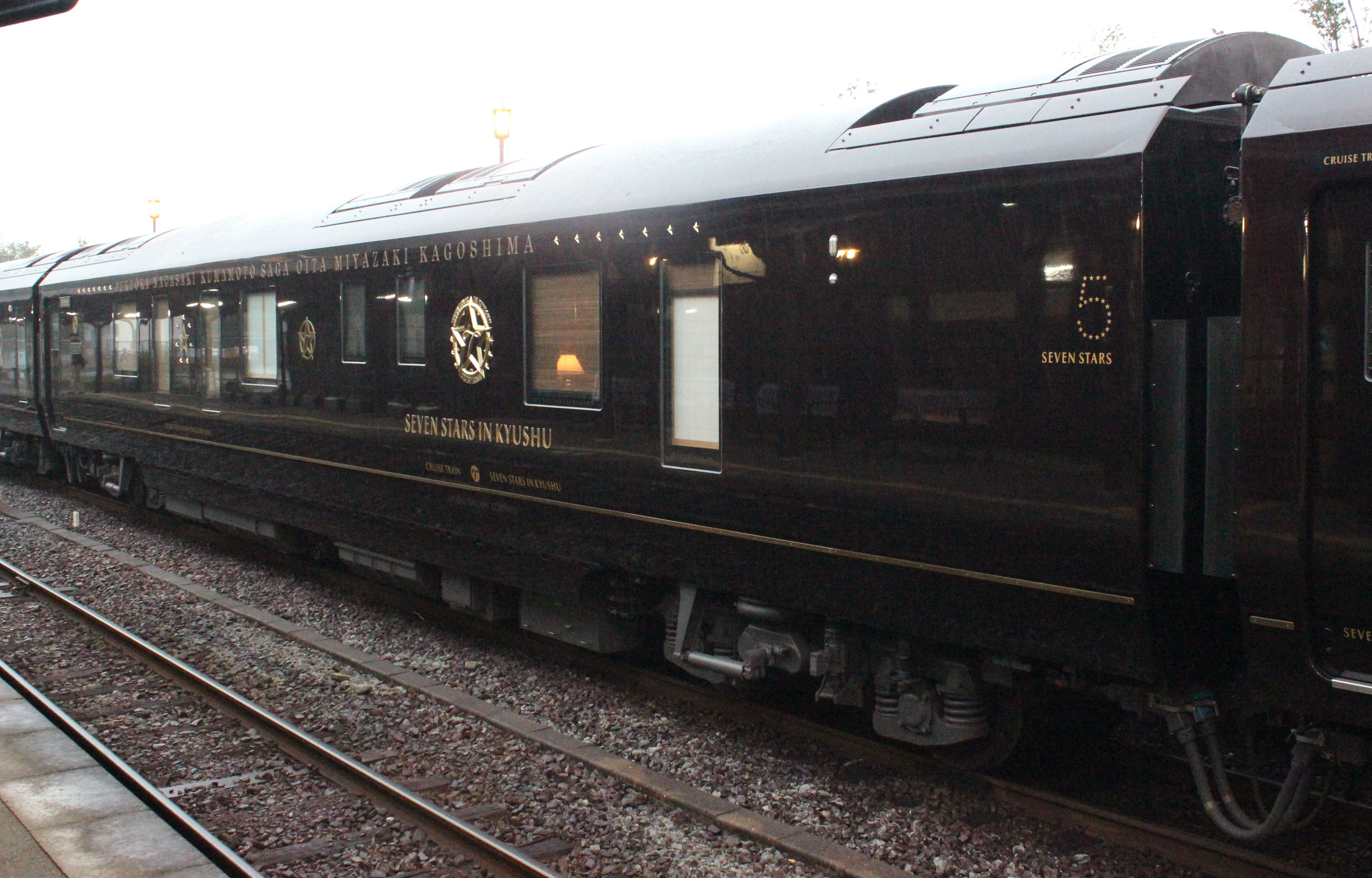
MaINe 77-7005 (car 5)

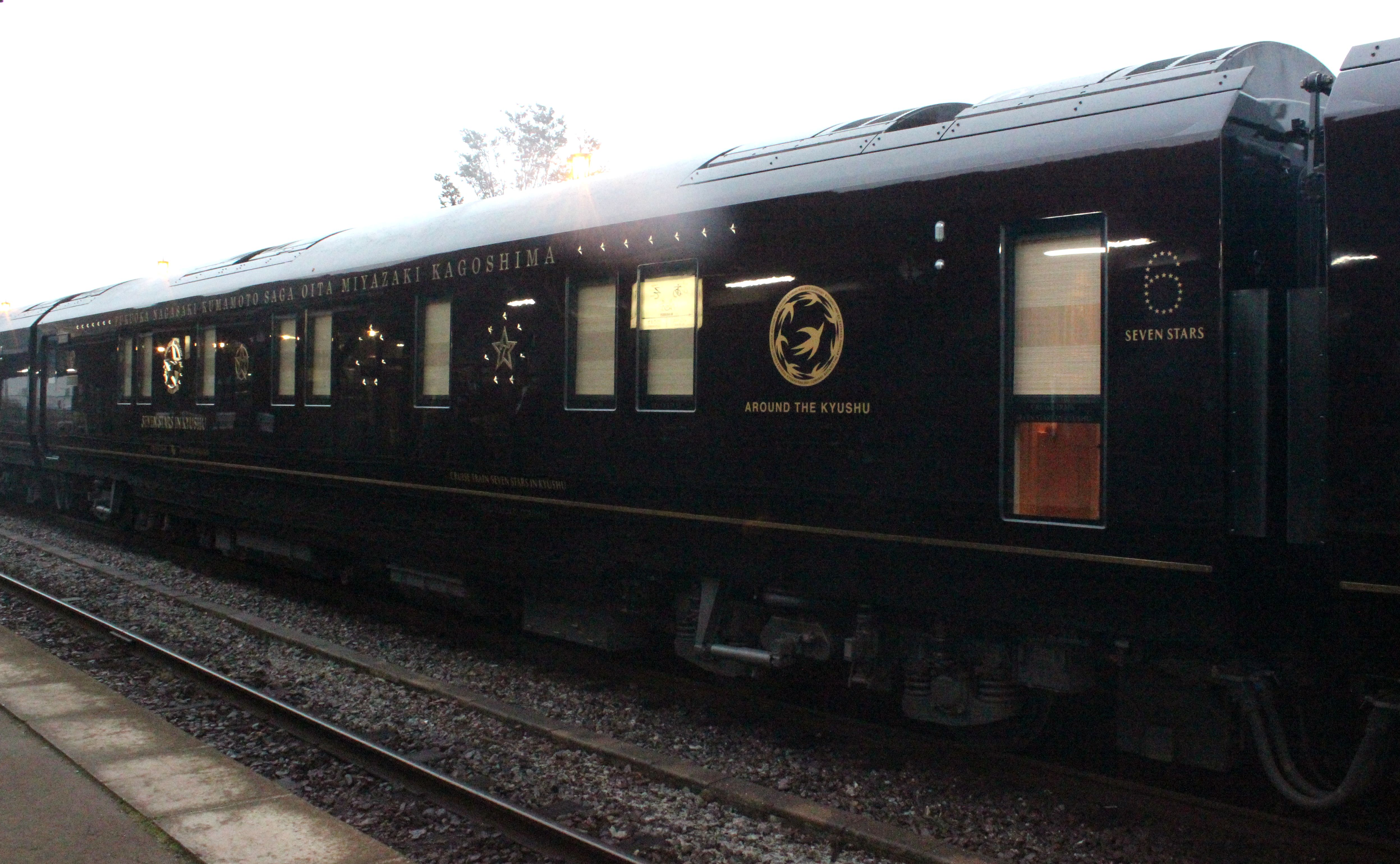
MaINe 77-7006 (car 6)

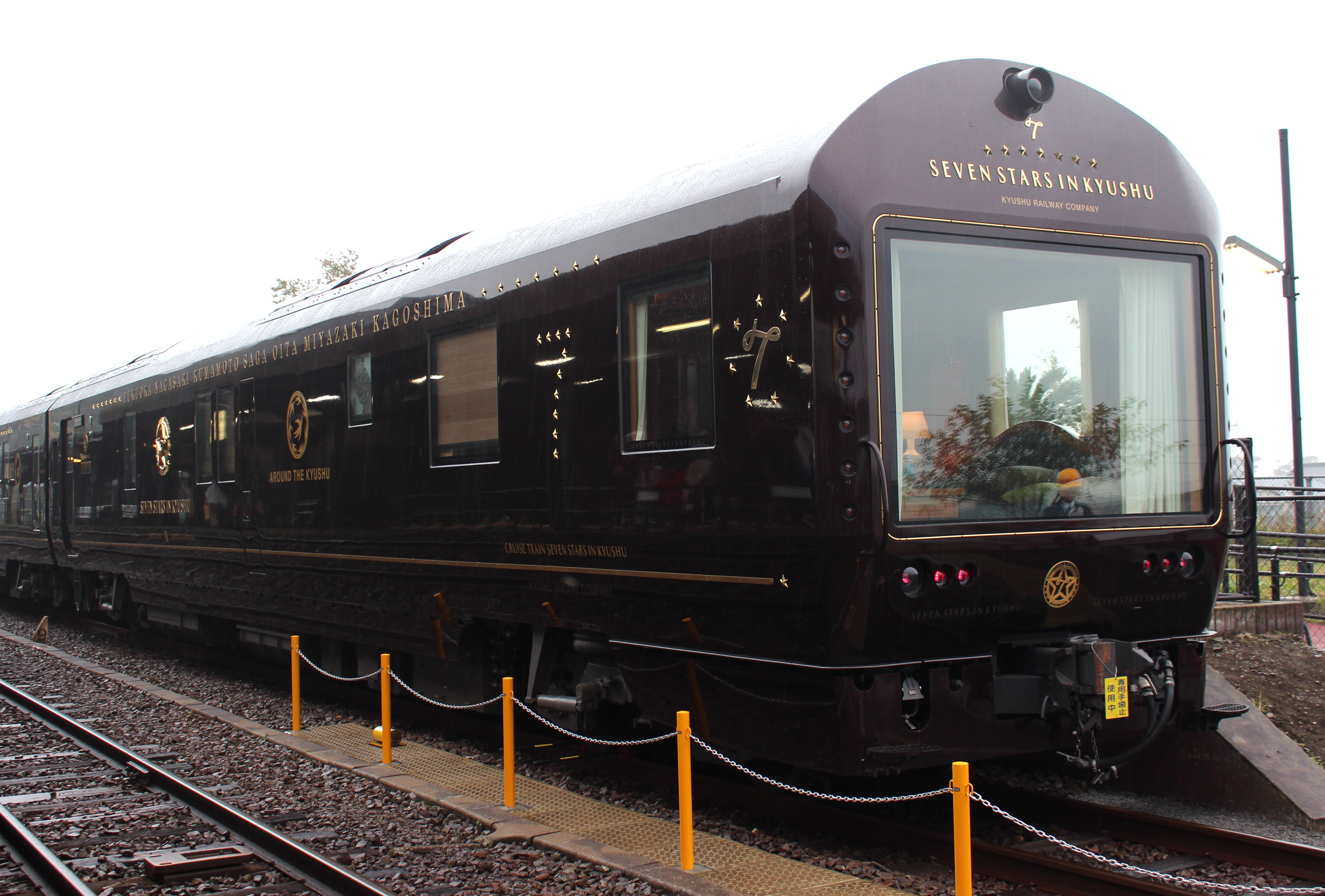
MaINeFu 77-7007 (car 7)

== Route ==
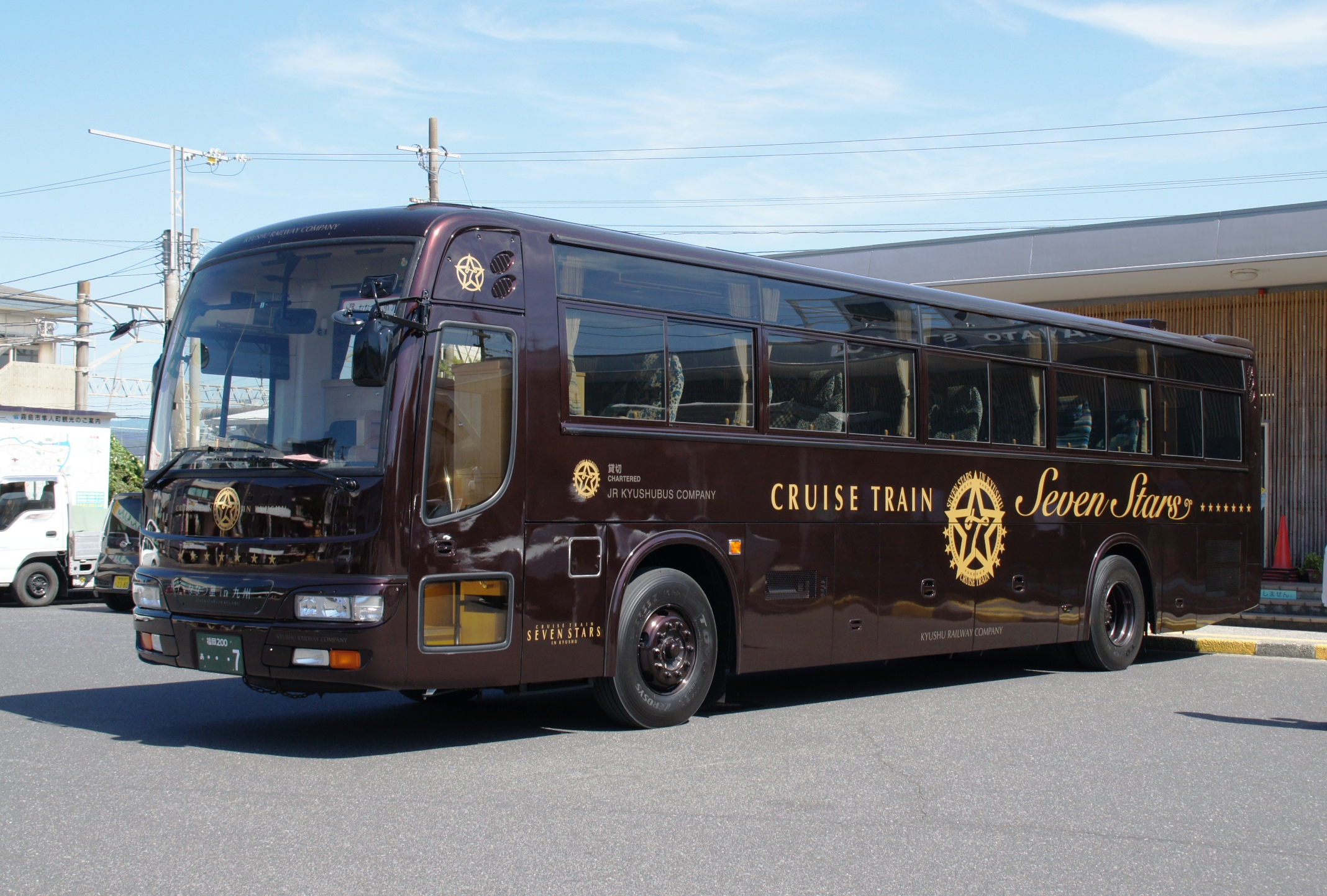
A dedicated tour coach for use by Seven Stars in Kyushu passengers

The train operates on two-day and four-day circular tours of Kyushu, starting and finishing at Hakata Station. Coach tours are provided from various stations along the route.

=== 2-day itinerary ===
Day 1
Hakata → Nagasaki
Day 2
Aso → Yufuin → Hakata

=== 4-day itinerary ===
Day 1
Hakata → Yufuin
Day 2
Miyazaki → Miyakonojō → Hayato
Day 3
Hayato → Kagoshima-Chuo → Kagoshima
Day 4
Aso → Bungo-Mori → Hakata

== History ==
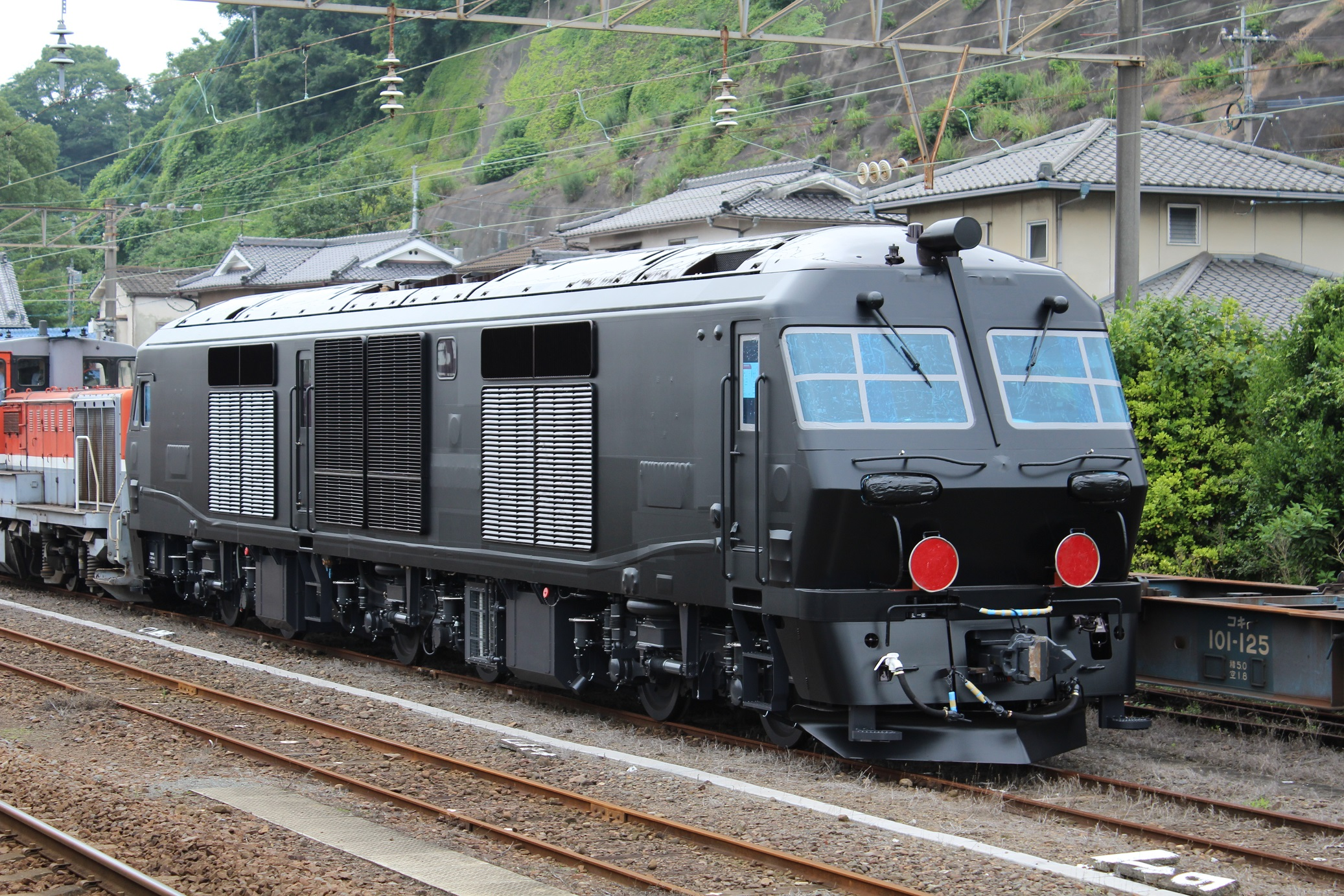
DF200-7000 on delivery covered in protective black film to protect the livery underneath, July 2013

The dedicated Class DF200-7000 diesel locomotive for this train was delivered to JR Kyushu's Oita Depot from the Kawasaki Heavy Industries Rolling Stock Company in Kobe on 2 July 2013. Four coaches were delivered from Hitachi's Kudamatsu factory on 18 July 2013. The train entered revenue service on 15 October 2013. Introducing Kyushu to the world is a part of the train's purpose.

== See also ==
- List of named passenger trains of Japan
- Joyful Train, the generic name for excursion and charter trains in Japan
- Cassiopeia, a luxury sleeping car train operated by JR East in Japan
- Twilight Express Mizukaze, a luxury sleeping car excursion train operated by JR West in Japan
- Train Suite Shiki-shima, a luxury sleeping car excursion train operated by JR East in Japan
