= Kirishima (train) =

Japan limited express train

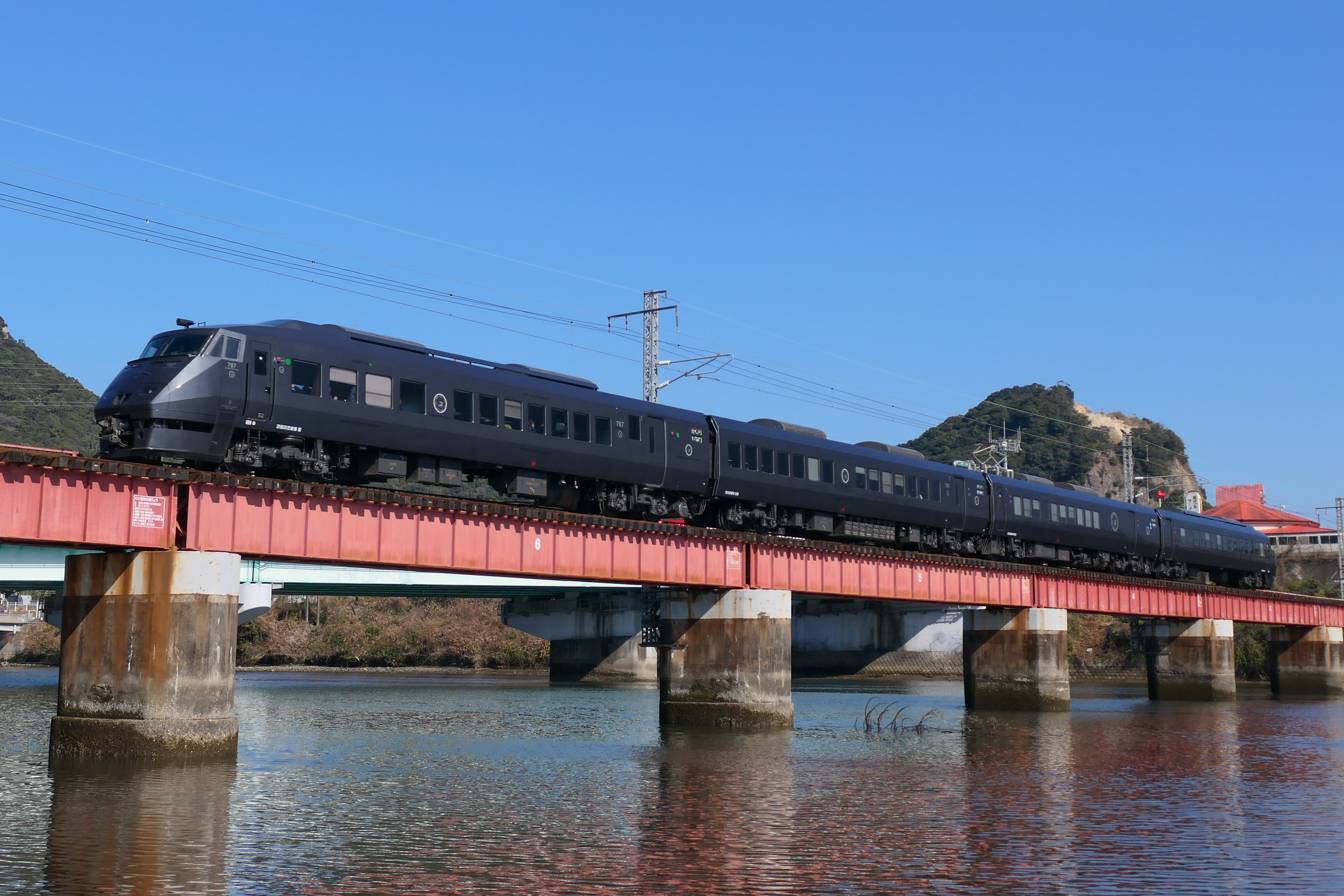
- 787 series train Kirishima

Overview
- Service type: Limited express
- Locale: Miyazaki and Kagoshima Prefectures, Japan
- Predecessor: Rapid "Kinko"; Limited Express "Nichirin"
- First service: 20 April 1995; 31 years ago
- Current operator: JR Kyushu

Route
- Termini: Miyazaki / Kokubu; Kagoshima-Chūō
- Distance travelled: 125.9 km (78.2 mi)
- Lines used: Nippō Main Line; Kagoshima Main Line

Technical
- Rolling stock: 783 series, 787 series EMUs
- Track gauge: 1,067 mm (3 ft 6 in)
- Electrification: 20 kV AC 60 Hz (overhead lines)

The Kirishima (きりしま) is a limited express train service operated by JR Kyushu which runs between Kagoshima-Chūō and Miyazaki in Japan.

== Rolling stock ==
- 485 series (20 April 1995 - 12 March 2011)
- 783 series
- 787 series
