= Ariake (train) =

Former Japanese limited express train service

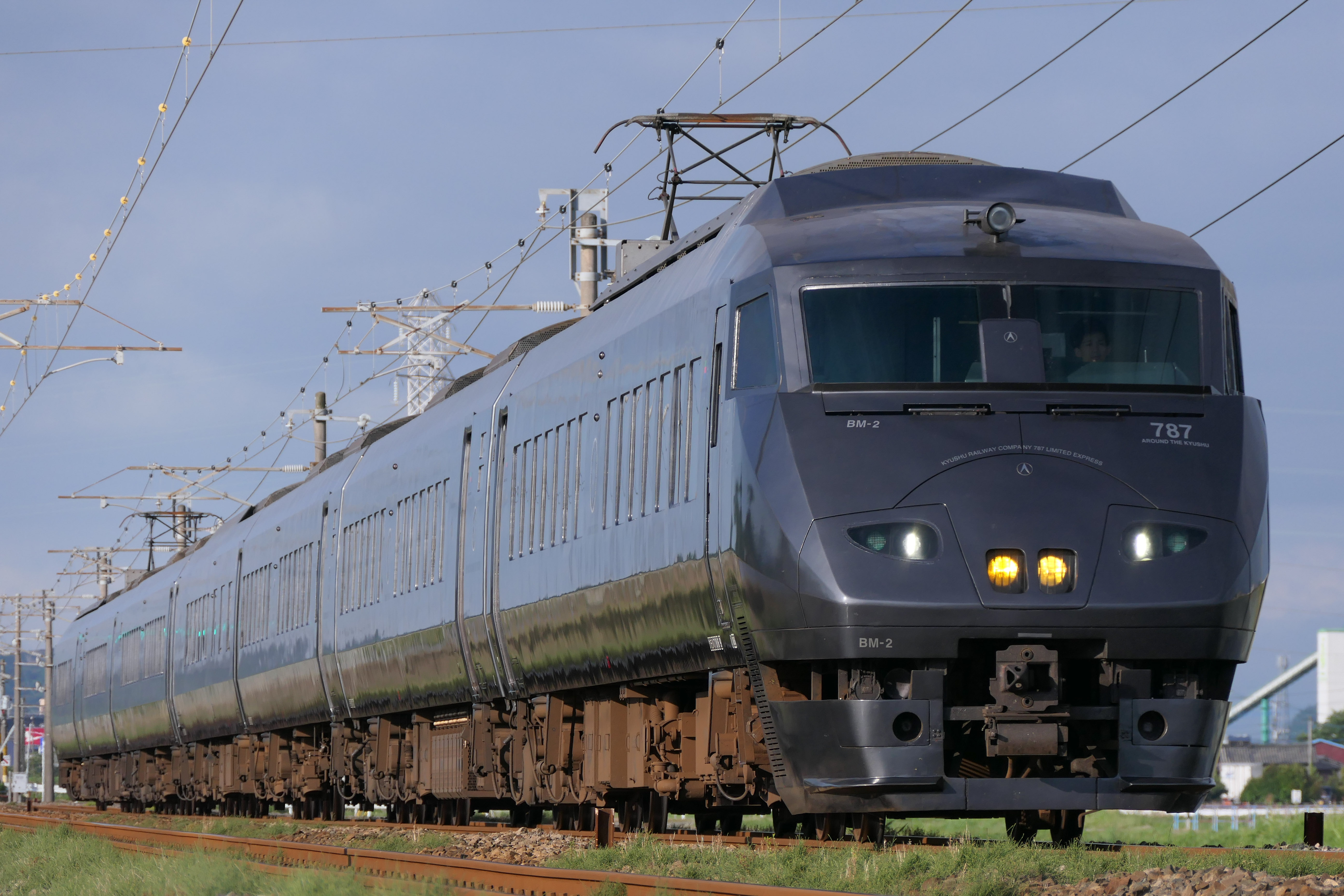
- 787 series train on Ariake service, June 2019

Overview
- Service type: Limited express
- Status: Discontinued
- Locale: Kyushu, Japan
- First service: 1 October 1950
- Last service: 12 March 2021
- Current operator: JR Kyushu
- Former operator: JNR

Route
- Termini: Hakata
- Stops: Omuta

Technical
- Rolling stock: 787 series EMU
- Track gauge: 1,067 mm (3 ft 6 in)
- Electrification: 20 kV AC
- Operating speed: 130 km/h (80 mph)

The Ariake (有明) was a limited express train service operated in Kyushu, Japan by Kyushu Railway Company (JR Kyushu). It ran between Hakata in Fukuoka Prefecture and Kumamoto in Kumamoto Prefecture. It operated from 1 October 1950 to 12 March 2021.

== History ==
The Ariake service commenced on 1 October 1950, originally as a "Semi express" service operating between Hakata and Kumamoto. From 1 October 1965, the train was upgraded to become an "Express" service and was extended to run between Okayama and Kumamoto. From 1 October 1967, the train was upgraded to become a "Limited express" service, running between Mojiko and Nishi-Kagoshima (now Kagoshima-Chuo).

With the opening of the Kyushu Shinkansen, the number of Ariake services gradually decreased.

On 12 February 2021, JR Kyushu announced the discontinuation of the Ariake. The last service operated on 12 March 2021.

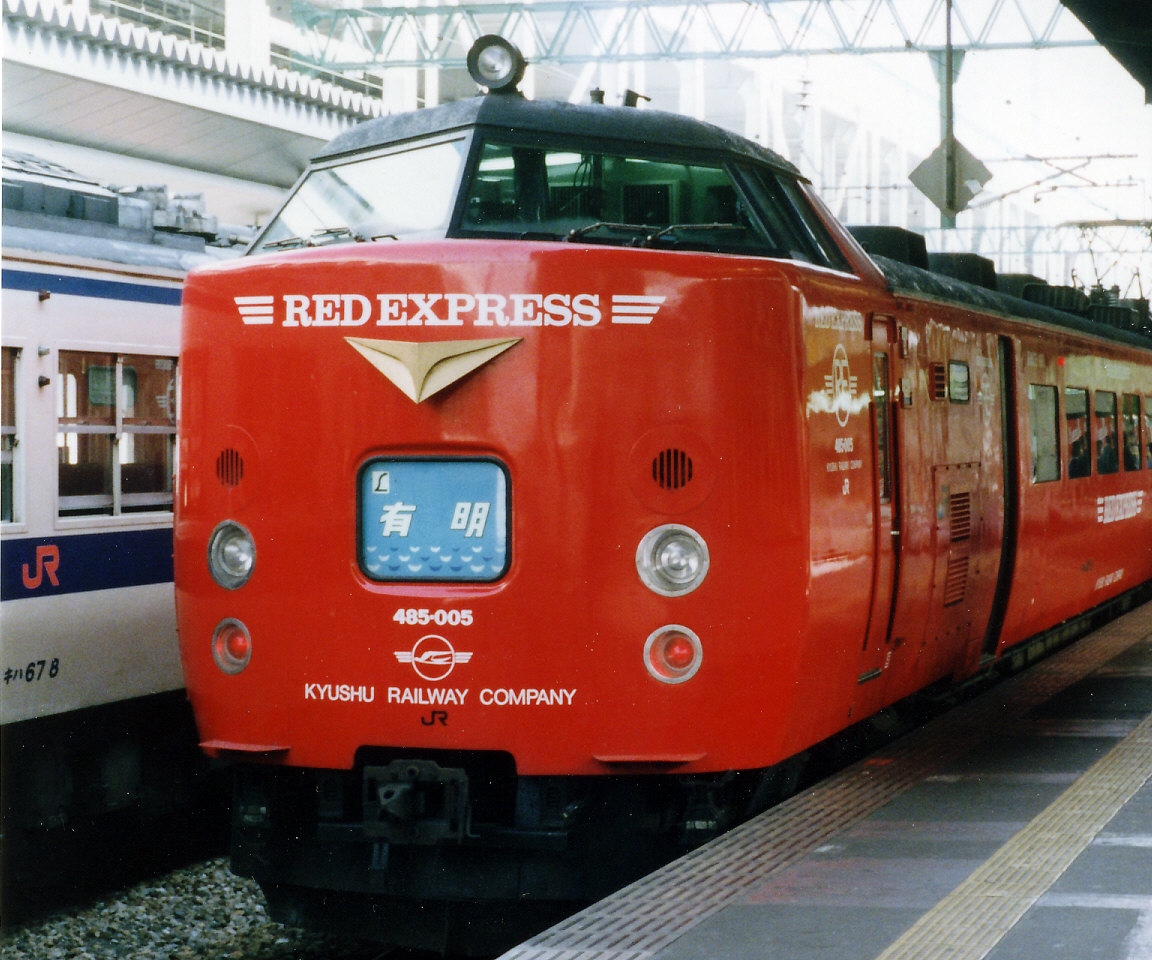
A 485 series EMU on an Ariake service in 1991

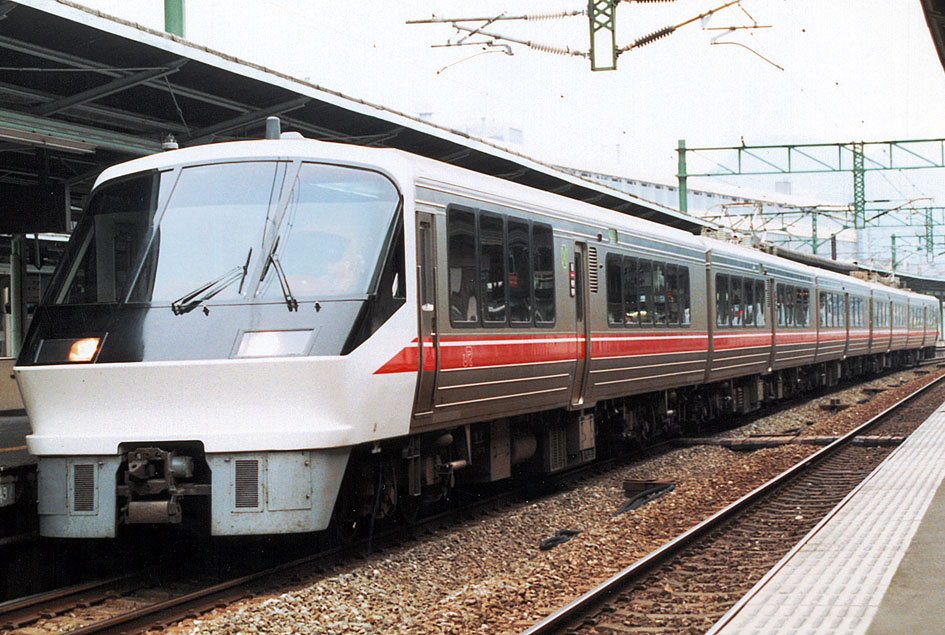
A 783 series EMU on a Hyper Ariake service around 1990
