= Midori (train) =

Japanese express train service

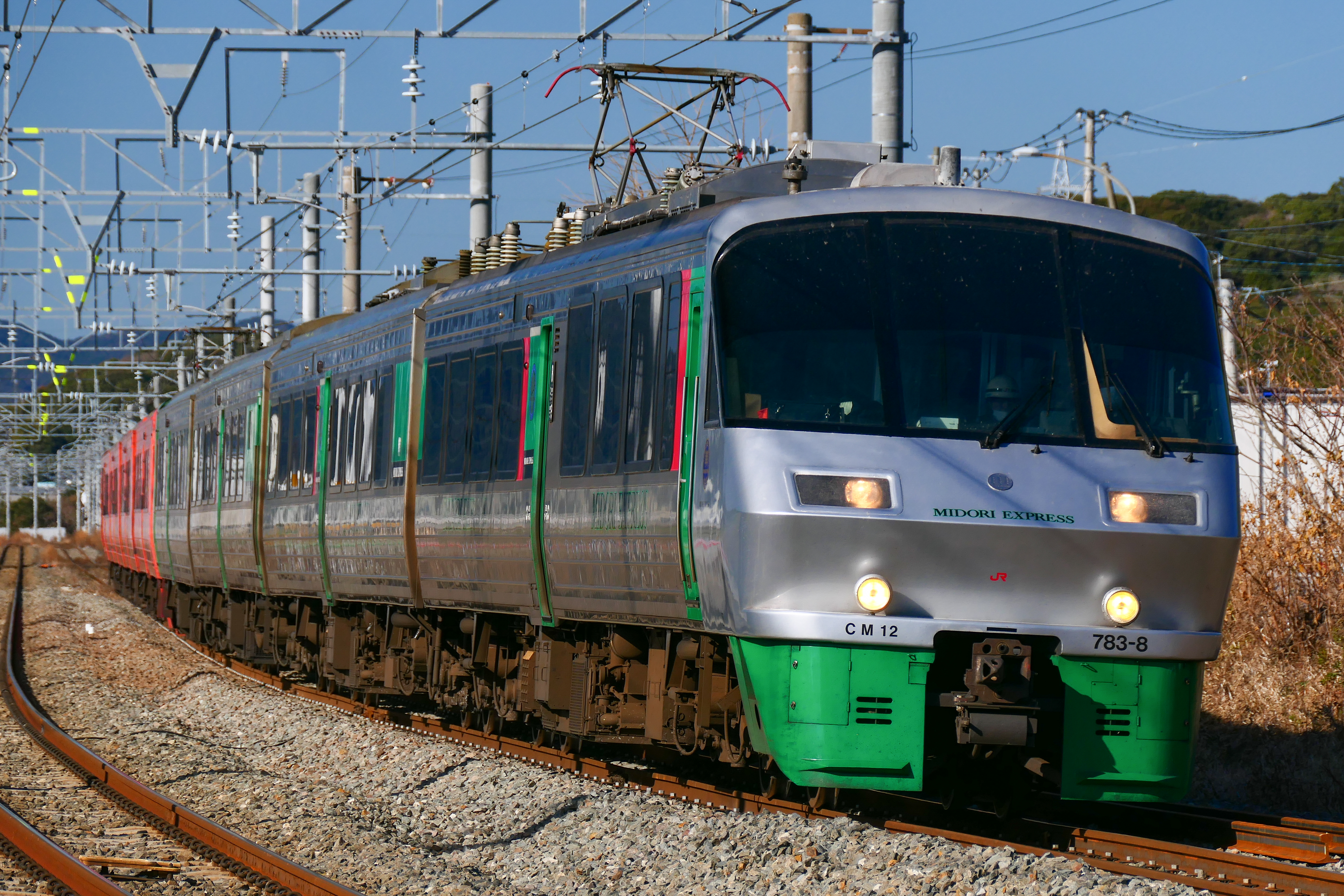
- 783 series train on a Midori service, January 2023

Overview
- Service type: Limited express
- Locale: Kyushu
- First service: 1 October 1961
- Current operator: JR Kyushu

Route
- Termini: Hakata; Sasebo
- Stops: 10
- Distance travelled: 117.0 km (72.7 mi)
- Lines used: Kagoshima, Nagasaki, Sasebo

Technical
- Rolling stock: 783 series
- Track gauge: 1,067 mm (3 ft 6 in)
- Electrification: Overhead line, 20 kV 60 Hz AC
- Operating speed: 130 km/h (81 mph)

The Midori (Japanese: みどり; lit. 'Green') is a limited express train service which runs between Hakata and Sasebo in Kyushu, Japan, operated by the Kyushu Railway Company (JR Kyushu). Midori services operate between Hakata and Sasebo. Many trains are coupled with Huis Ten Bosch services between Hakata and Haiki and others operate as Relay Kamome trains between Hakata and Takeo-Onsen and are branded as "Midori (Relay Kamome)".

== Stops ==
Trains stop at the following stations:

Hakata - Futsukaichi - Tosu - Shin-Tosu - Saga - Kōhoku - Takeo-Onsen - Arita - Haiki - Sasebo

== Rolling stock ==
Services are typically formed of 4-car 783 series electric multiple unit (EMU) sets with Green Car (first class) accommodation. All cars are non-smoking. Car numbering starts at 5, a continuation of train cars 1–4 on the typically connected Huis Ten Bosch service.

As of 2022 some Midori services also operate as Relay Kamome trains between Hakata and Takeo-Onsen and are branded as "Midori (Relay Kamome)". These services use either 783 series trains (in an 8-car formation) or the 885 series typically assigned to Relay Kamome services.

	← Sasebo Hakata →				
Car No.	5		6	7	8
Accommodation	Green	Reserved	Reserved	Non-reserved	

== History ==
The Midori name was first used from 1 October 1961 on limited express services operating between Osaka and Hakata using 12-car KiHa 80 series diesel multiple unit (DMU) sets. Timings were as shown below.

- Down: Osaka 13:40 → Hakata 22:35
- Up: Hakata 07:25 → Osaka 16:20

From 1 October 1964, with the opening of the Tokaido Shinkansen, services operated between Shin-Osaka and Kumamoto and Oita. Although the route was now electrified, services continued to use KiHa 80 series DMU sets formed as 13 cars.

- Down: Shin-Osaka 10:30 → Kumamoto 21:35 / Oita 21:10
- Up: Kumamoto 08:30 / Oita 09:10 → Shin-Osaka 19:35

From 1 October 1965, the services operated between Shin-Osaka and Sasebo and Oita. From 1 October 1967, services were once again modified to run between Shin-Osaka and Oita, this time using new 581 series EMUs. The 581 series units were used for only a year on these services, however, replaced by 11-car 485 series EMU formations from October 1968.

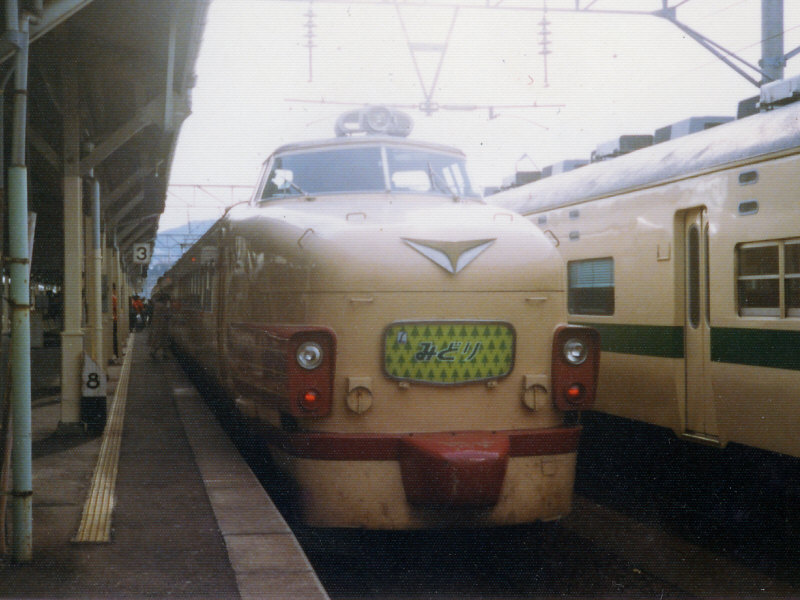
A 485 series EMU on a Midori service, circa 1985

With the opening of the Sanyō Shinkansen to Okayama in October 1973, Midori services were increased to two return workings daily, operating between Okayama and Oita. From April 1974, the Nippo Main Line to Minami-Miyazaki was electrified, and the Midori services were reorganized as shown below, with one working daily extended to and from Miyazaki.

- Down Midori 1: Osaka → Oita
- Down Midori 2: Okayama → Miyazaki
- Up Midori 1: Oita → Okayama
- Up Midori 2: Miyazaki → Osaka

These services were discontinued from March 1975 following the completion of the Sanyō Shinkansen to Hakata.

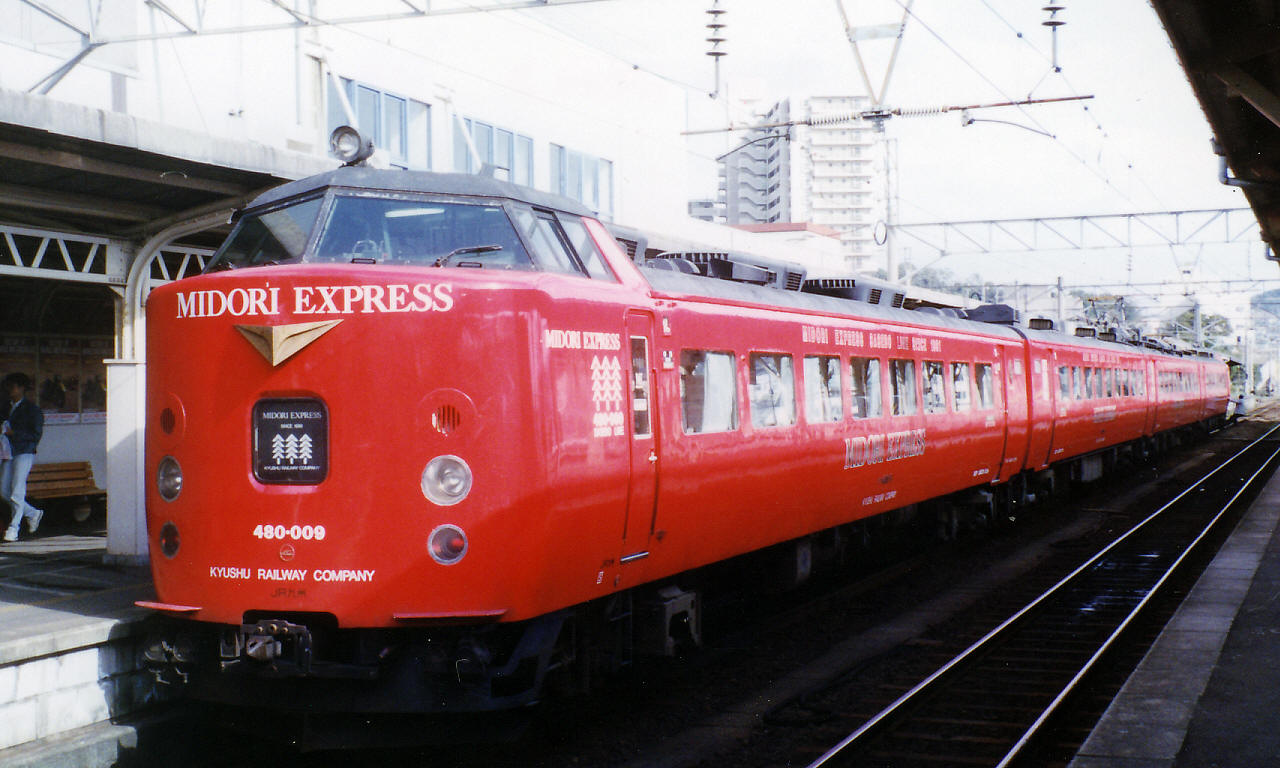
Refurbished JR Kyushu 485 series EMU with "Midori Express" branding, March 1994

From 1 July 1976, following electrification of the route from Hakata to Nagasaki and Sasebo, the Midori name was revived for new services operating between Kokura, Hakata and Sasebo, using 4-car 485 series EMUs running as 12-car formations in conjunction with Kamome services between Kokura/Hakata and Hizen-Yamaguchi. Initially 6 return workings daily were operated, increased to 10 daily from October 1980, and further increased to 13 return workings daily from November 1982. From November 1986, the Midori services were rescheduled to operate separately from the Kamome services. Following privatization of Japanese National Railways (JNR), the 485 series EMUs used on Midori services were refurbished between 1990 and 1991, receiving all-over red liveries and "Midori Express" branding. By March 2000, all services were operated with 783 series EMUs.
