= Kyushu Railway Company =

Japanese railway company

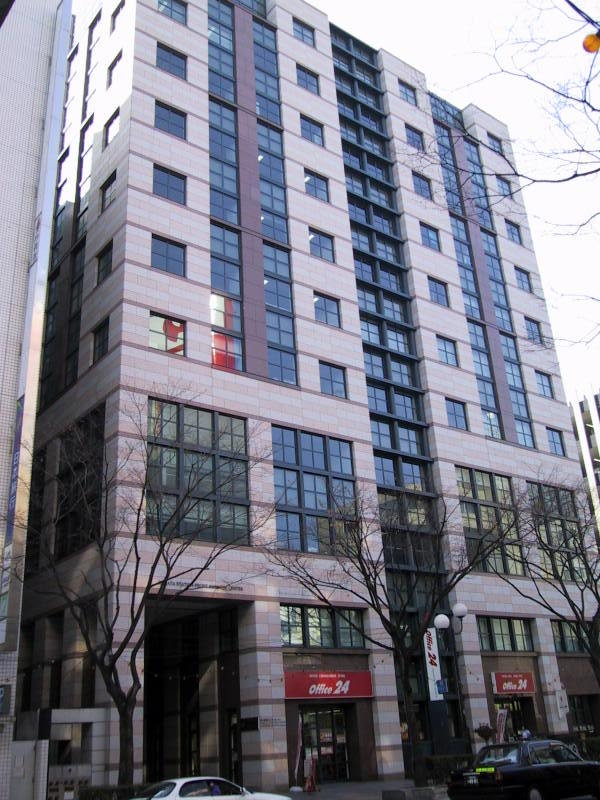
- JR Kyushu headquarters (7th floor) near Hakata Station
- Native name: 九州旅客鉄道株式会社
- Romanized name: Kyūshū Ryokaku Tetsudō Kabushiki gaisha
- Type: Public
- Traded as: TYO: 9142; FSE: 9142
- Industry: Rail transport
- Predecessor: Japanese National Railways (JNR)
- Founded: 1 April 1987; 39 years ago (privatization of JNR)
- Headquarters: 3-25-21 Hakata Ekimae; Hakata-ku, Fukuoka, Fukuoka Prefecture, Japan
- Products: SUGOCA (a rechargeable contactless smart card)
- Services: passenger railways freight services bus transportation Real estate development other related services
- Owner: JRTT (1987–2016); Public float (2016–present) (Note: Largest shareholders: Morgan Stanley investment accounts(5.55%) TMTBJ investment trusts (4.80%) J.P. Morgan investment accounts (3.39%) SSBTC TREATY 505234 (2.84%))
- Number of employees: 7,576 (as of April 1, 2024)
- Website: jrkyushu.co.jp/english/index.html

Kyushu Railway Company

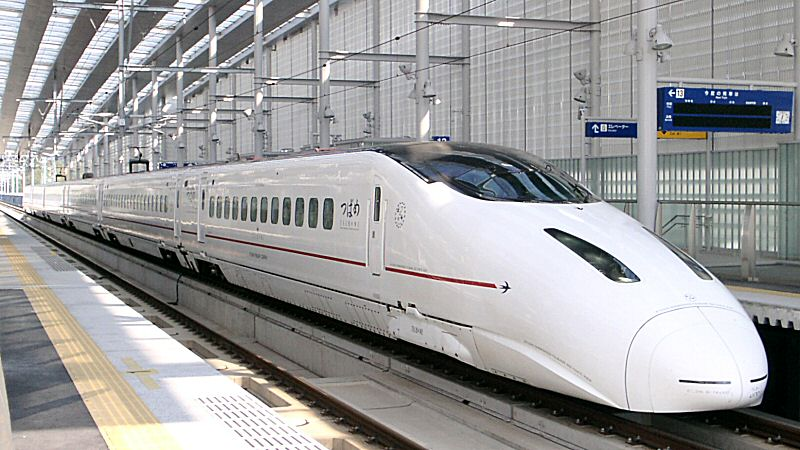
- Kyushu Shinkansen 800 series Tsubame

Operation
- National railway: Japan Railways Group
- Infrastructure company: Japan Railway Construction, Transport and Technology Agency

Statistics
- Ridership: 334 million
- Passenger-distance: 8.354 billion per year

System length
- Total: 2,342.6 km (1,455.6 mi)
- Double track: 772.8 km (480.2 mi) (34%) (As at 2017)
- Electrified: 1,358.7 km (844.3 mi) (58%)
- High-speed: 358.35 km (222.67 mi) (12.7%)

Track gauge
- Main: 1,067 mm (3 ft 6 in)
- High-speed: 1,435 mm (4 ft 8 1/2 in)

Electrification
- Main: 1,500 V DC overhead catenary 1,341.1 km (833.3 mi)
- 25 kV AC 60 Hz overhead: 358.5 km (222.8 mi); Kyushu Shinkansen & Nishi Kyushu Shinkansen

Features
- Tunnel length: 53.85 kilometers (33.46 Miles)
- Longest tunnel: Seikan Tunnel
- No. of stations: 571
Map
- Time table

The Kyushu Railway Company, also referred to as JR Kyushu (JR九州, Jeiāru Kyūshū), is one of the seven constituent companies of Japan Railways Group (JR Group). It operates intercity rail services within Kyushu, Japan. It formerly operated the Beetle hydrofoil service across the Tsushima Strait between Fukuoka and Busan, South Korea, before its discontinuation in 2024. It also operates hotels, restaurants, and drugstores across its service region. JR Kyushu's headquarters are in Hakata-ku, Fukuoka.

== History ==
When Japanese National Railways was divided in 1987, Kyushu Railway Company inherited its assets and operations on the island of Kyushu along with losses of around 28.8 billion yen, exacerbated by a growing highway network in Kyushu and many lightly used rural lines. After privatization, JR Kyushu diversified its business into new ventures such as fish and mushroom farming and car sales. Two of its more successful side ventures were the Beetle ferry, started in 1991, and the Train d'or bakery chain, started in 1992. JR Kyushu also built up its premium rail services through the development of the Kyushu Shinkansen high-speed rail line and the Seven Stars in Kyushu luxury excursion train.

The company introduced SUGOCA, a smart card ticketing system, from 1 March 2009.

JR Kyushu executed its initial public offering in October 2016. Non-railway operations account for roughly 60% of the company's sales and most of its profits.

== Lines ==
=== Shinkansen lines ===
- Kyūshū Shinkansen (Hakata–Kagoshima-Chūō)
- Nishi Kyushu Shinkansen (Takeo-Onsen–Nagasaki)

=== Main lines ===
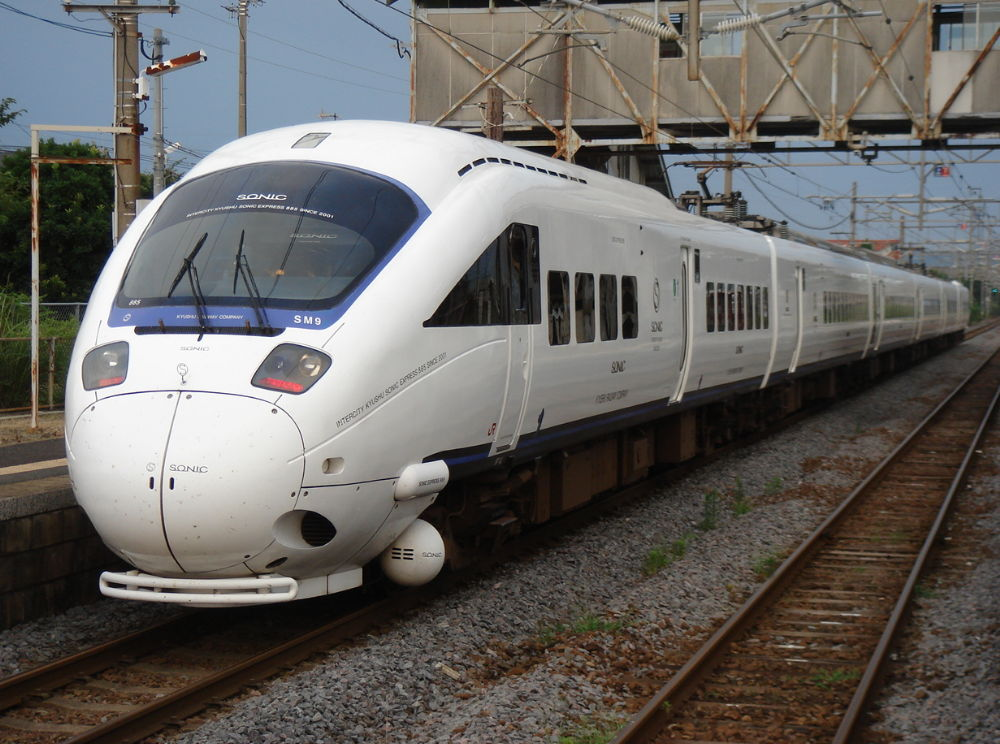
885 series White Sonic limited express EMU

- Kagoshima Main Line
- Nagasaki Line
- Nippō Main Line
- Chikuhō Main Line
- Kyūdai Main Line
- Hōhi Main Line

=== Other lines ===
- Chikuhi Line
- Fukuhoku Yutaka Line (a service name for the route formed by the Sasaguri Line and portions of the Kagoshima and Chikuhō main lines)
- Gotōji Line
- Hitahikosan Line
- Kashii Line
- Hisatsu Line
- Ibusuki Makurazaki Line
- Karatsu Line
- Kitto Line
- Misumi Line
- Miyazaki Kūkō Line
- Nichinan Line
- Ōmura Line
- Sasebo Line

== Limited express and tourist train services ==
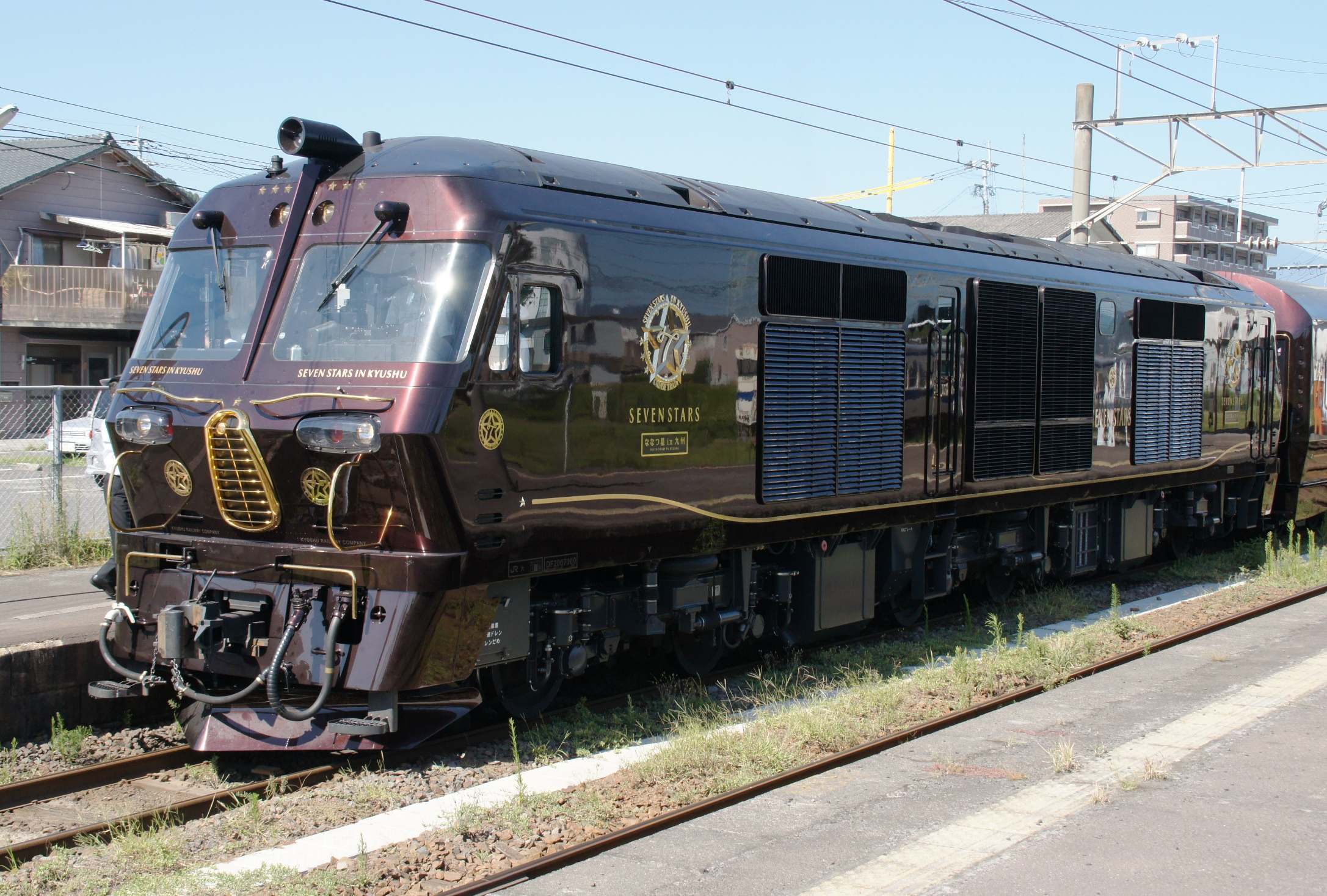
The Seven Stars in Kyushu Class DF200 locomotive DF200-7000, September 2013

- Ariake (Hakata - Kumamoto)
- Aru Ressha (Ōita - Hita April to June)(Sasebo - Nagasaki July to September)
- Aso Boy (Kumamoto - Miyaji)
- A-Train (Kumamoto - Misumi)
- Hayato no Kaze (Kagoshima-Chūō - Yoshimatsu)
- Huis Ten Bosch (Hakata - Huis Ten Bosch)
- Ibusuki no Tamatebako (Kagoshima-Chūō - Ibusuki)
- Isaburo & Shinpei (Hitoyoshi - Yoshimatsu)
- Kaiō (Hakata - Nōgata)
- Kasasagi (Hakata - Hizen-Kashima)
- Kawasemi Yamasemi (Kumamoto - Hitoyoshi)
- Kirameki (Mojikō - Hakata)
- Kirishima (Miyazaki - Kagoshima-Chūō)
- Kumagawa (Kumamoto - Hitoyoshi)
- Midori (Hakata - Sasebo)
- Nichirin/Nichirin Seagaia (Hakata - Miyazaki Kūkō)
- Relay Kamome (Hakata - Takeo-Onsen)
- Seven Stars in Kyushu (Circular tours of Kyushu)
- SL Hitoyoshi (Kumamoto - Hitoyoshi/Kumamoto - Tosu)
- Sonic (Hakata - Ōita)
- Trans-Kyushu Limited Express (Hitoyoshi - Ōita)
- Umisachi-Yamasachi (Miyazaki - Nangō)
- Yufu / Yufu DX/Yufuin-no-mori (Hakata - Ōita)

== See also ==
- Kyūshū Railway - a predecessor of JR Kyushu
