= List of cities in Nagasaki Prefecture by population =

The following list ranks all cities (including towns and villages) in the Japanese prefecture of Nagasaki with a population of more than 5,000, according to the 2020 Census. As of October 1, 2020, 20 places fulfill this criterion and are listed here. This list refers only to the population of individual cities, towns and villages within their defined limits, which does not include other municipalities or suburban areas within urban agglomerations.

== List ==
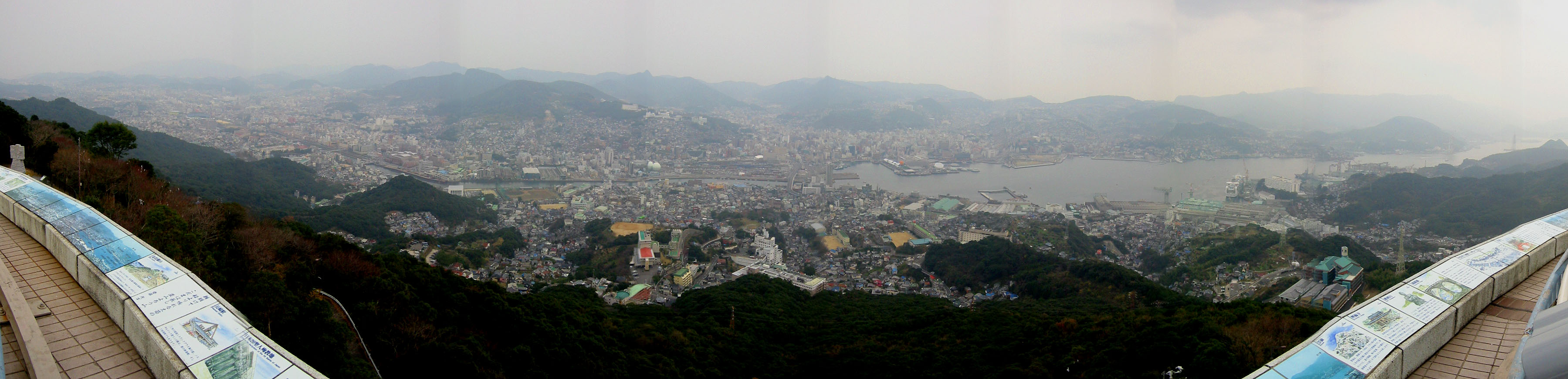
Nagasaki

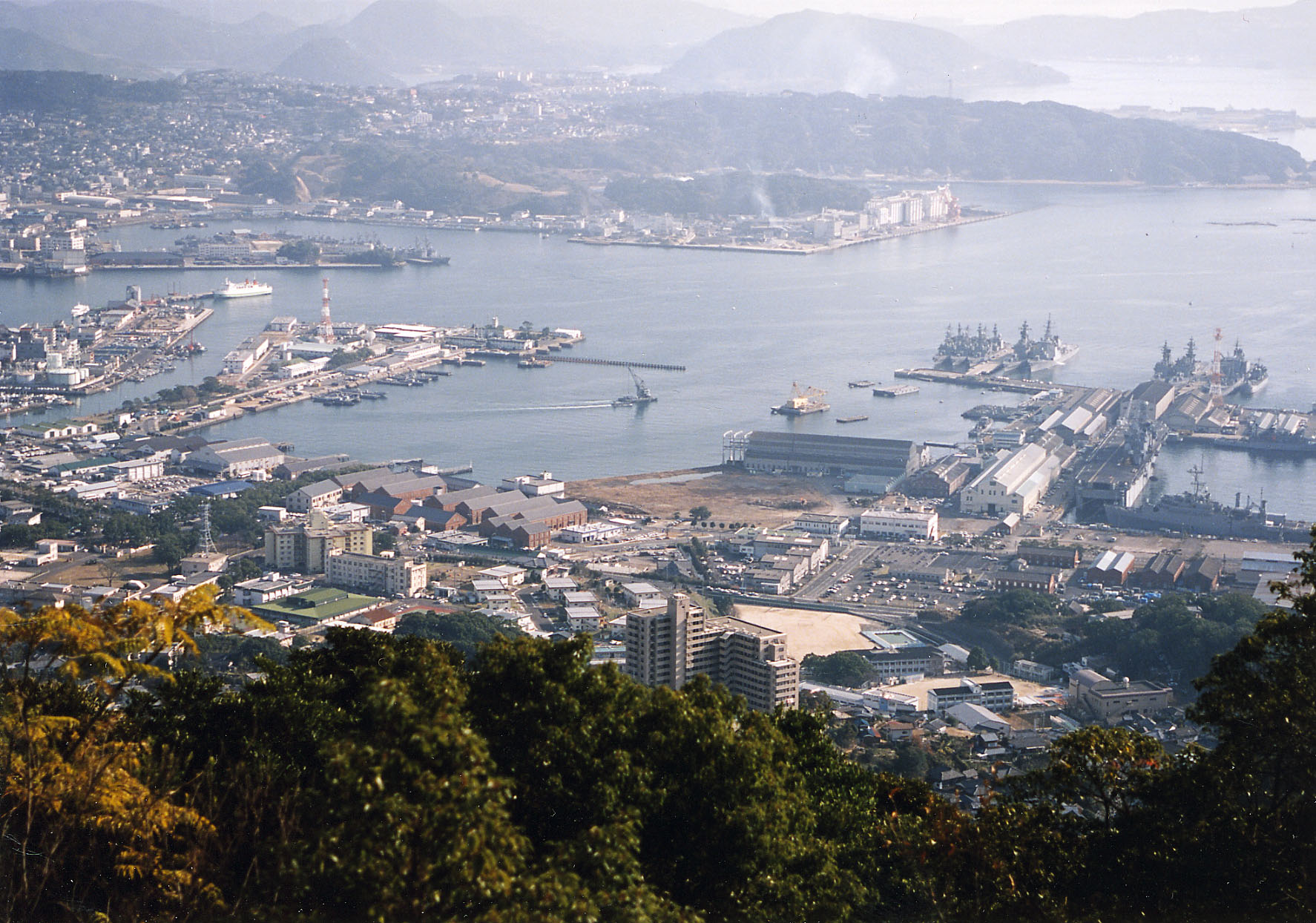
Sasebo

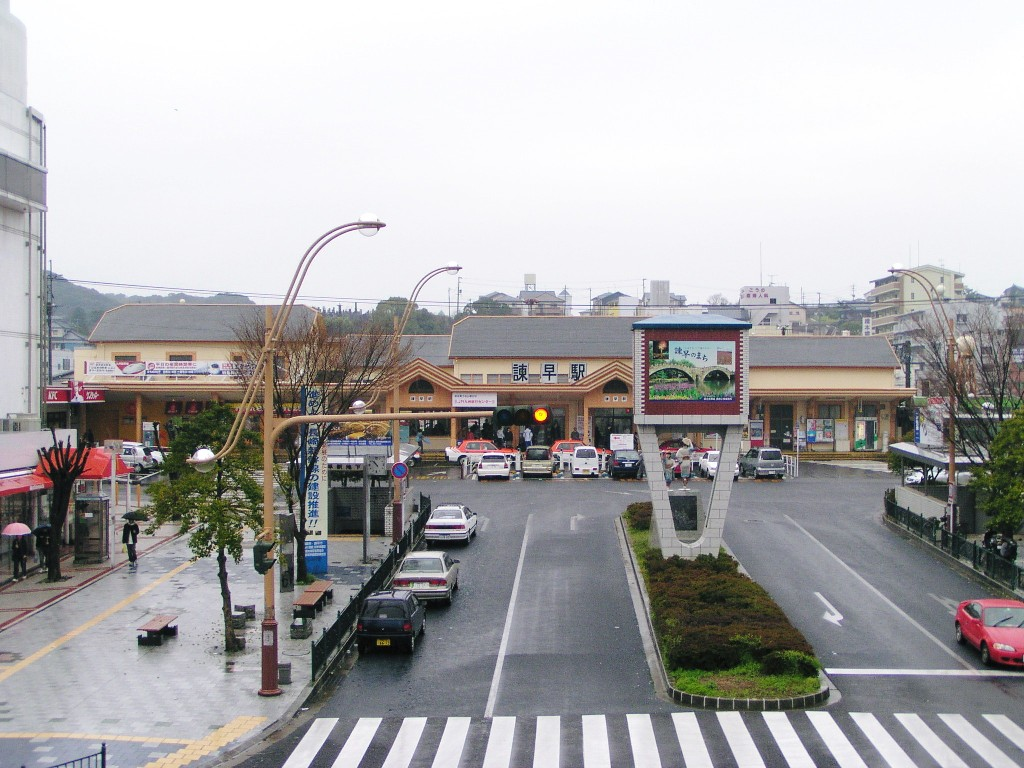
Isahaya

The following table lists the 20 cities, villages and towns in Nagasaki with a population of at least 5,000 on October 1, 2020, according to the 2020 Census. The table also gives an overview of the evolution of the population since the 1995 census.

Rank (2020)	Name	Status	2020	2015	2010	2005	2000	1995
1	Nagasaki	City	409,305	429,508	443,766	455,206	470,135	487,063
2	Sasebo	City	243,387	255,439	261,101	269,574	274,399	279,551
3	Isahaya	City	133,957	138,078	140,752	144,034	144,299	142,517
4	Ōmura	City	95,452	92,757	90,517	88,040	84,414	79,279
5	Shimabara	City	43,360	45,436	47,455	50,045	51,563	52,853
6	Minamishimabara	City	42,360	46,535	50,363	54,045	57,045	58,898
7	Unzen	City	41,131	44,115	47,245	49,998	52,230	54,048
8	Nagayo	Town	40,800	42,548	42,535	42,655	40,356	35,377
9	Gotō	City	34,400	37,327	40,622	44,765	48,533	51,295
10	Hirado	City	29,375	31,920	34,905	38,389	41,586	43,966
11	Togitsu	Town	29,356	29,804	30,110	29,127	28,065	26,932
12	Tsushima	City	28,511	31,457	34,407	38,481	41,230	43,513
13	Saikai	City	26,296	28,691	31,176	33,680	35,288	36,327
14	Iki	City	24,974	27,103	29,377	31,414	33,538	35,089
15	Matsuura	City	21,284	23,309	25,145	26,993	28,370	30,470
16	Shinkamigotō	Town	17,511	19,718	22,074	25,039	27,559	29,845
17	Hasami	Town	14,302	14,891	15,227	15,367	15,462	15,565
18	Saza	Town	13,923	13,626	13,599	13,697	13,335	12,695
19	Kawatana	Town	13,394	14,067	14,651	15,158	15,325	15,064
20	Higashisonogi	Town	7,734	8,298	8,903	9,657	10,026	10,349
