= Ōmura Rail Yard Station =

Railway station in Ōmura, Nagasaki Prefecture, Japan

Ōmura Rail Yard Station 大村車両基地駅
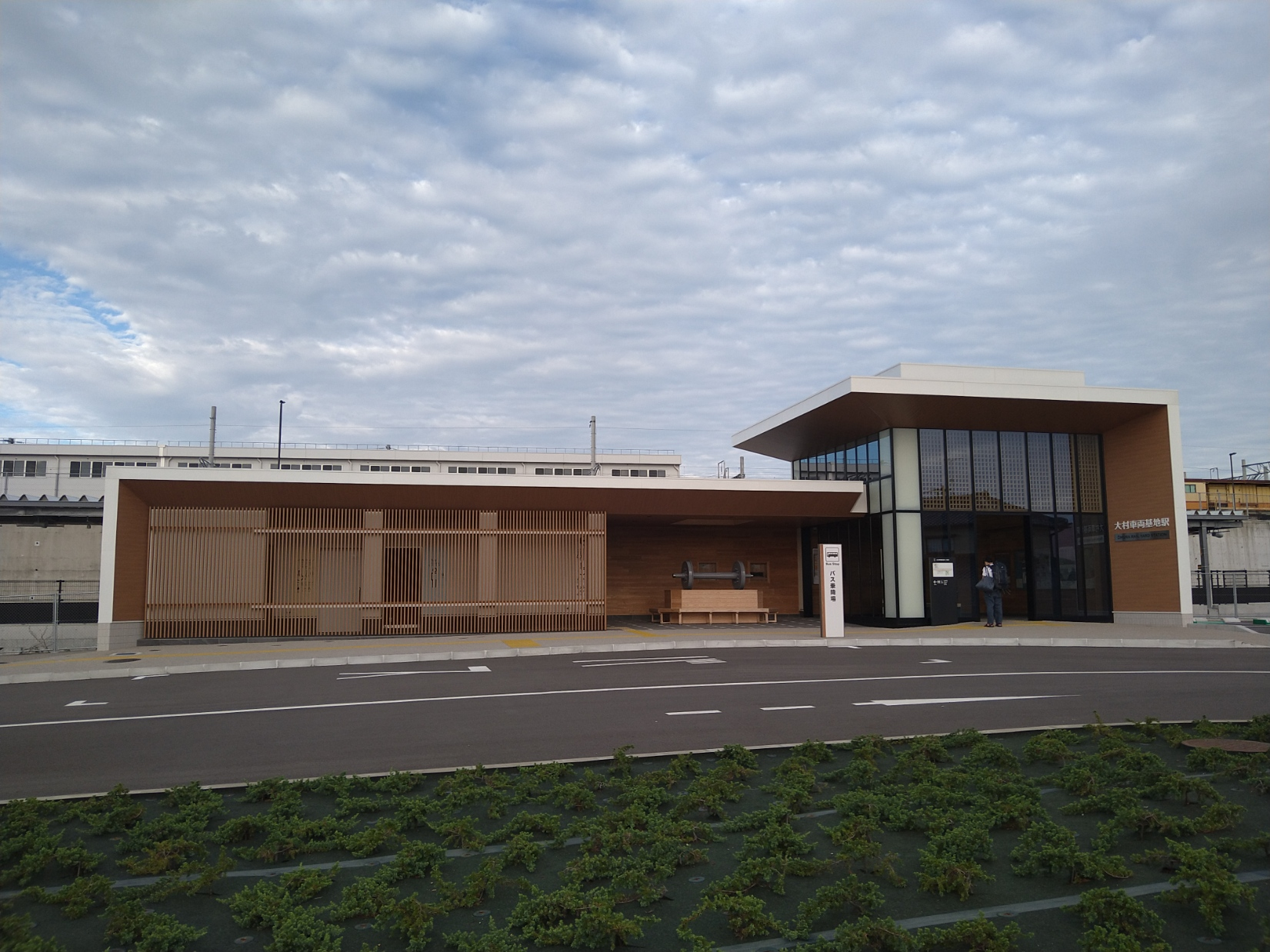
- Station building

General information
- Location: 3 Chome Miyashoji; Ōmura, Nagasaki; Japan
- Coordinates: 32°57′18.8″N 129°56′40.3″E
- Operator: JR Kyushu
- Distance: 31.1 km (19.3 mi) from Haiki
- Platforms: 1 side platform
- Tracks: 1

Construction
- Structure type: At-grade
- Parking: Available
- Accessible: Yes

Other information
- Status: Unstaffed
- Website: Official website

History
- Opened: 23 September 2022

Services
Preceding station	JR Kyushu	Following station
Takematsu towards Isahaya	Ōmura Line Local	Matsubara towards Haiki
Takematsu towards Isahaya	Ōmura Line Seaside Liner	Sonogi towards Haiki
Location
- Location within Nagasaki Prefecture Location within Japan

Ōmura Rail Yard Station (大村車両基地駅, Ōmura-Sharyōkichi-eki) is a passenger railway station located in the city of Ōmura, Nagasaki Prefecture, Japan. It is operated by JR Kyushu.

== Lines ==
The station is served by the Ōmura Line and is located 31.1 kilometres (19.3 mi) from the starting point of the line at Haiki. Besides the local services on the line, the Rapid Seaside Liner also stops at the station.

== Station layout ==
The station consists of one side platform serving a single track. The station building, a modern steel-frame structure with a waiting room has large glass windows. It is unattended.

== History ==
Ōmura Rail Yard Station opened on 23 September 2022 as an additional stop on the existing Ōmura Line. The station was built to provide access to JR Kyushu's rail yard for the Nishi Kyushu Shinkansen, which is reflected in its name.

== Surrounding area ==
- Kumamoto General Vehicle Depot Omura Vehicle Management Office (Omura Vehicle Depot)
- Nagasaki Prefectural School for the Deaf
- Nagasaki Prefectural Niji no Hara Special Needs School
- Omura Municipal Junior High School

== See also ==
- List of railway stations in Japan
