= Matsubara Station (Nagasaki) =

Railway station in Ōmura, Nagasaki Prefecture, Japan

Matsubara Station 松原駅
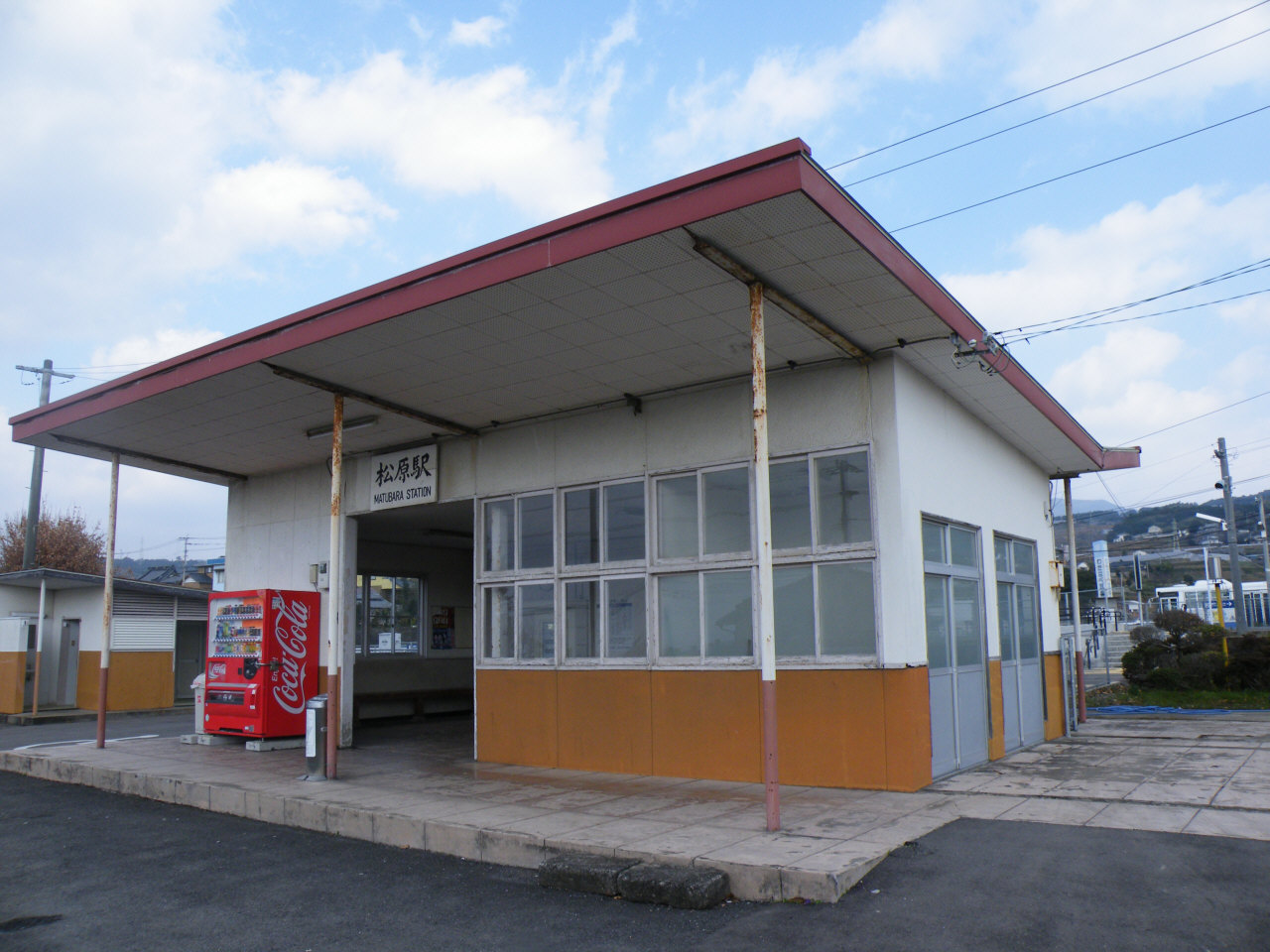
- Matsubara Station in 2009

General information
- Location: Matsubara-honmachi, Ōmura-shi, Nagasaki-ken 856-0009; Japan
- Coordinates: 32°58′41″N 129°56′45″E
- Operator: JR Kyushu
- Line: ■ Ōmura Line
- Distance: 28.5 km from Haiki
- Platforms: 2 side platforms
- Tracks: 2 + 1 siding

Construction
- Structure type: At grade
- Parking: Available

Other information
- Status: Unstaffed
- Website: Official website

History
- Opened: 20 January 1898

Passengers
- FY2014: 76 daily

Services
Preceding station	JR Kyushu	Following station
Ōmura Rail Yard towards Isahaya	Ōmura Line Local	Chiwata towards Haiki
Takematsu towards Isahaya	Ōmura Line Seaside Liner	Chiwata towards Haiki
Location
- Location within Nagasaki Prefecture Location within Japan

Matsubara Station (松原駅, Matsubara-eki) is a passenger railway station located in the city of Ōmura, Nagasaki Prefecture, Japan. It is operated by JR Kyushu.

== Lines ==
The station is served by the Ōmura Line and is located 28.5 km from the starting point of the line at Haiki. Aside from the local services on the line, some trains of the Rapid Seaside Liner also stop at the station.

== Station layout ==
The station consists of two side platforms serving two tracks. A siding branches off the main tracks and runs in between the station building and the platforms. The station building, a modern steel-frame structure, is unstaffed and serves as a waiting room with an automated ticket vending machine. A level crossing provides access to the station platforms.

== History ==
The private Kyushu Railway, in building a line to Nagasaki, had opened a track southwards from Tosu to Saga and Takeo (today Takeo-Onsen) by 1895. By 1897, the track had reached Haiki. In the next phase of expansion, the track was extended towards Ōmura which opened as the new terminus on 20 January 1898. Matsubara was opened on the same day as an intermediate station between Haiki and Ōmura. When the Kyushu Railway was nationalized on 1 July 1907, Japanese Government Railways (JGR) took over control of the station. On 12 October 1909, track from Tosu through Haiki to Nagasaki was designated the Nagasaki Main Line. On 1 December 1934, another route was given the designation Nagasaki Main Line and the track from Haiki, through Matsubara to Isahaya was designated the Ōmura Line. With the privatization of Japanese National Railways (JNR), the successor of JGR, on 1 April 1987, control of the station was given to JR Kyushu.

== Passenger statistics ==
In fiscal 2014, there were a total of 27,802 boarding passengers, giving a daily average of 76 passengers.

== Surrounding area ==
- National Route 34

== See also ==
- List of railway stations in Japan
