= Hasami ware =

Type of Japanese porcelain ware

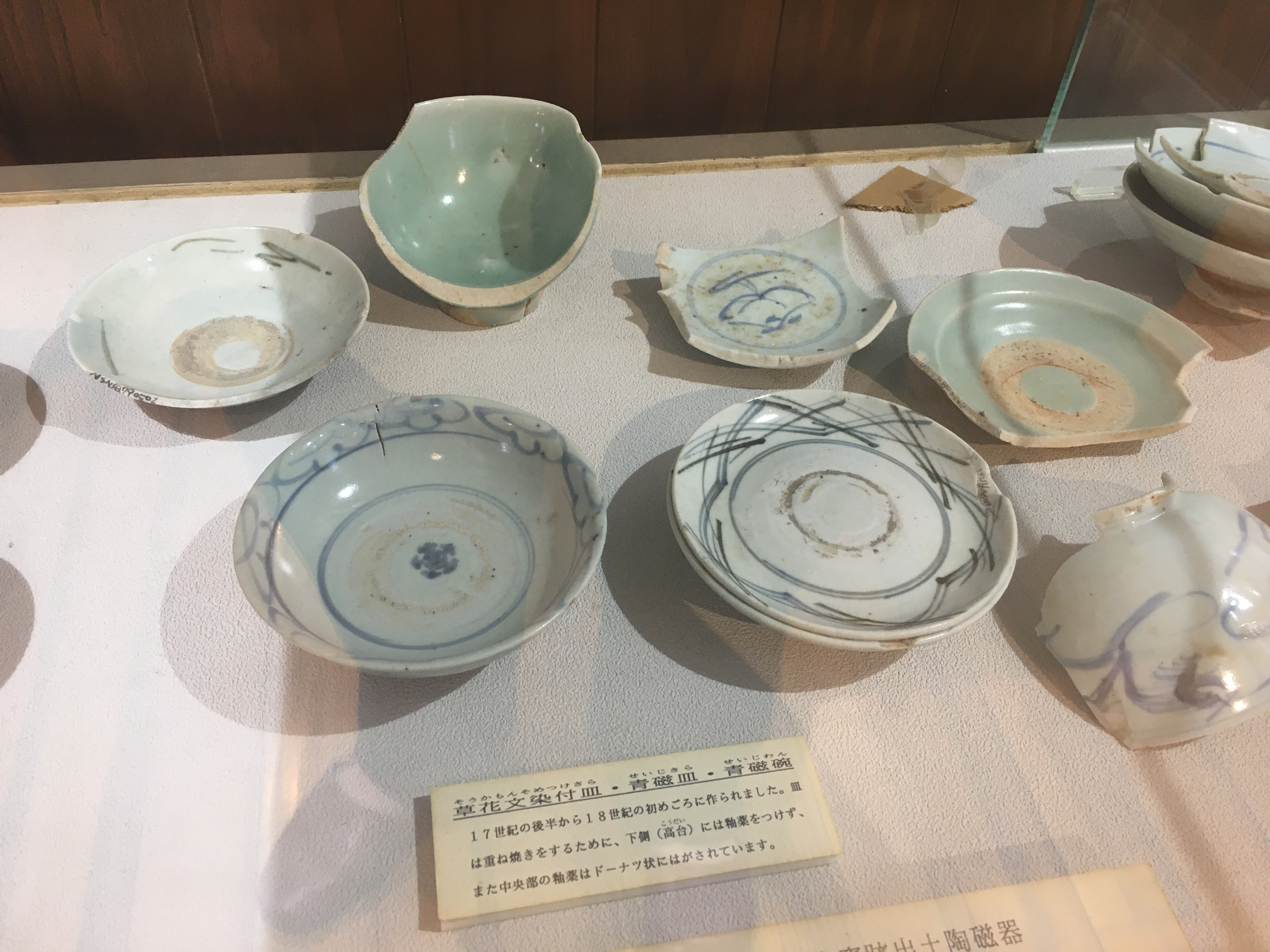
Hasamiyaki from the Nakaoue kiln

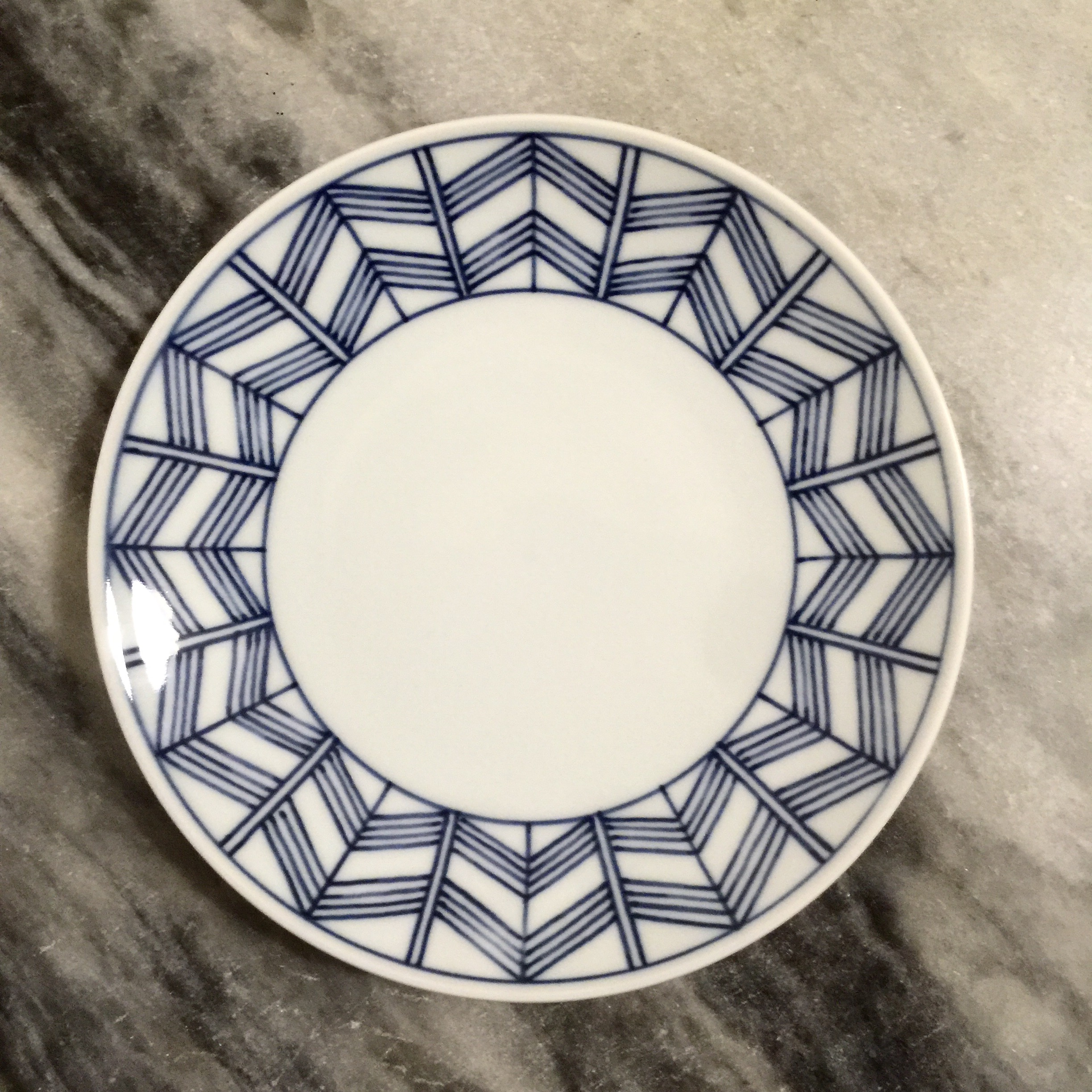
Modern Hasami porcelain plate

Hasami ware (波佐見焼, Hasami-yaki) is a type of Japanese pottery produced in the town of Hasami, Higashisonogi-gun, Nagasaki Prefecture. Originally produced for common people, Hasami porcelain has a history of 400 years.

== History ==
In 1599, when the Korean potter Yi Sam-pyeong was brought to Japan after the Japanese Invasion of Korea, climbing kilns and pottery centers developed in Hatanohara, Furusaraya, Yamanita and Hasami under the direction of Ōmura Yoshiaki, daimyo of Ōmura Domain. Typical Hasami ware uses underglaze cobalt blue and celadon, but at first they produced stonewares. Later the materials for porcelain were found, so gradually Hasami ware shifted from pottery to porcelain. In the late Edo period, Hasami was the number one producer of blue-and-white porcelain in Japan, and bottles and other products were exported. As its prices were low, Hasami ware was also distributed widely throughout Japan as everyday items for the common people. Hasami ware was a major source of revenue for Ōmura Domain, where they produced the biggest quantity of porcelain in the country in the latter Edo period.

In the modern period, the kilns in Hasama became subcontractors for Arita ware, and the name gradually became an unknown brand. Concerned that its brand identity would disappear, after 2002 Hasami began promoting its products under the "Hasami ware" label, and to revive the concept of producing "affordable everyday tableware for the masses that suits modern life."

=== Hizen Hasami Pottery Kiln Sites ===
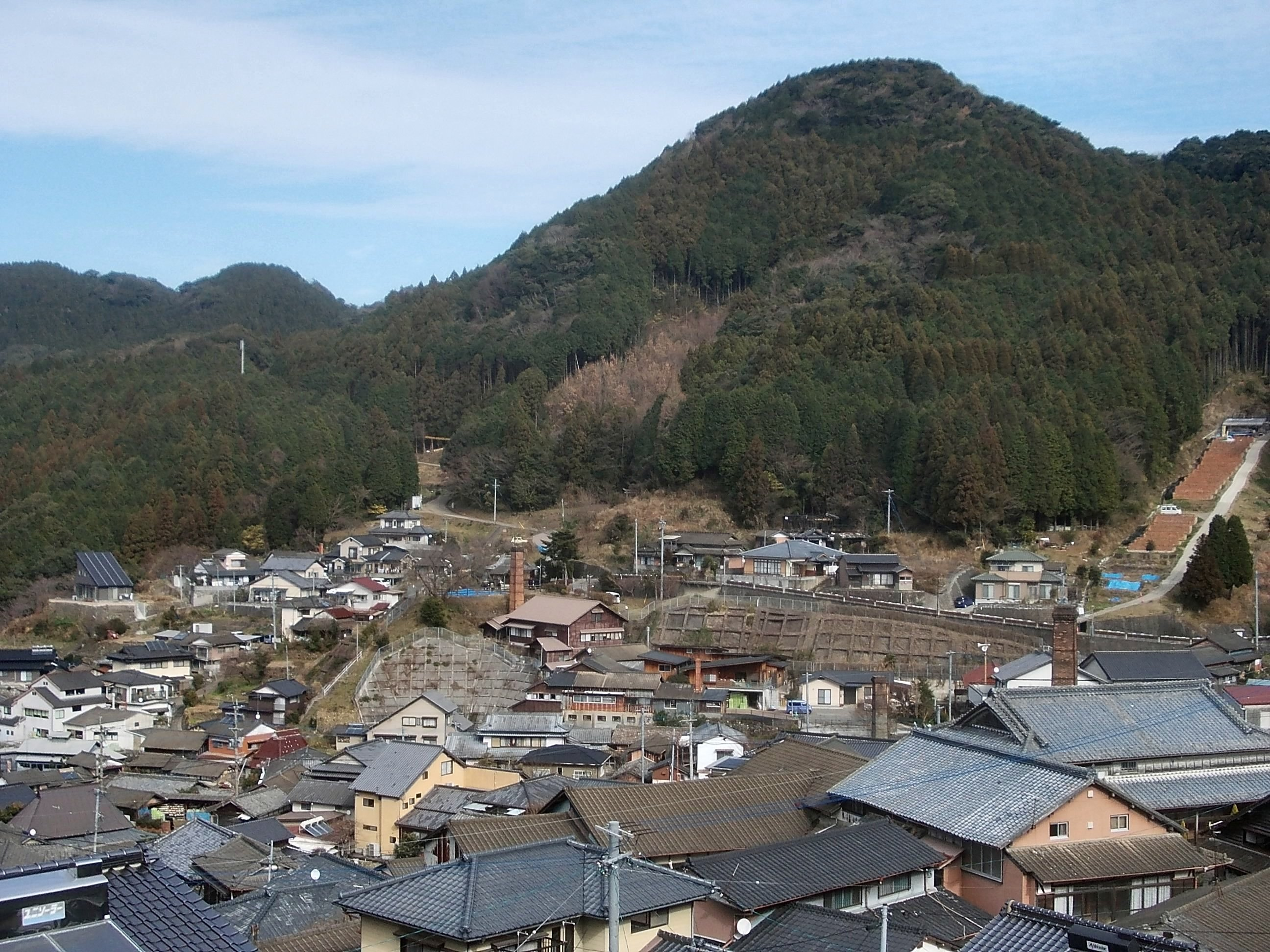
Nakaogo where the Nakaoue climbing kiln was located

The Hizen Hasami Pottery Kiln Sites (肥前波佐見陶磁器窯跡, Bizen Hasami tōjiki kama ato) are the ruins of the kilns which produced Hasami Ware in the Edo to early modern period. A total of 36 kiln sites have been identified in eight areas in the hills which surround the town of Hasami. Among them, the oldest, Hatanohara kiln (畑ノ原窯), has a remaining length of 55.4 meters and was one of the largest in Hizen Province during this period. It is a multi-chambered climbing kiln consisting of over 24 kiln rooms. From the early to mid-17th century, the first celadon in Japan was produced at this kiln, and production continued until the early 18th century. The earliest kiln dedicated solely to celadon was the Mimata celadon kiln (三股青磁窯), and the latest was the Nagatayama kiln (長田山窯). This celadon, known as "Hasami Celadon" or "Mimata Celadon," shows the influence of the Longquan kilns in China, and features floral designs created using advanced single-cut carving techniques and a transparent glaze.

In the late 17th century, Chinese porcelain production declined, and Hasami began to produce large quantities of products, mainly for Southeast Asia, but towards the end of the 17th century, exports of Chinese porcelain resumed, and Hizen porcelain shifted to domestic use. From the 18th century onwards, Hasami began to build huge kilns to mass-produce everyday products and reduce costs, a method that continued until the end of the Edo period. The Nakaoue climbing kiln (中尾上登り窯), was over 160 meters long and 33 firing chambers, the Nagaohon climbing kiln (永尾本登り窯), was 155 meters long, and had 29 firing chambers. These five kiln sites were designated collectively as a National Historic Site in 2000, along with the site of the Minmata Toishigawa quarry (三股砥石川陶石採石場) and the site of the Sarayama government office (皿山役所跡). The Sarayama government office was established by Ōmura domain in 1666 and continued to exist until 1870, and served as the central management center for the Hasami kilns, collecting tax revenue and inspecting product

== See also ==
- List of Historic Sites of Japan (Nagasaki)
