= Chiwata Station =

Railway station in Higashisonogi, Nagasaki Prefecture, Japan

Chiwata Station 千綿駅
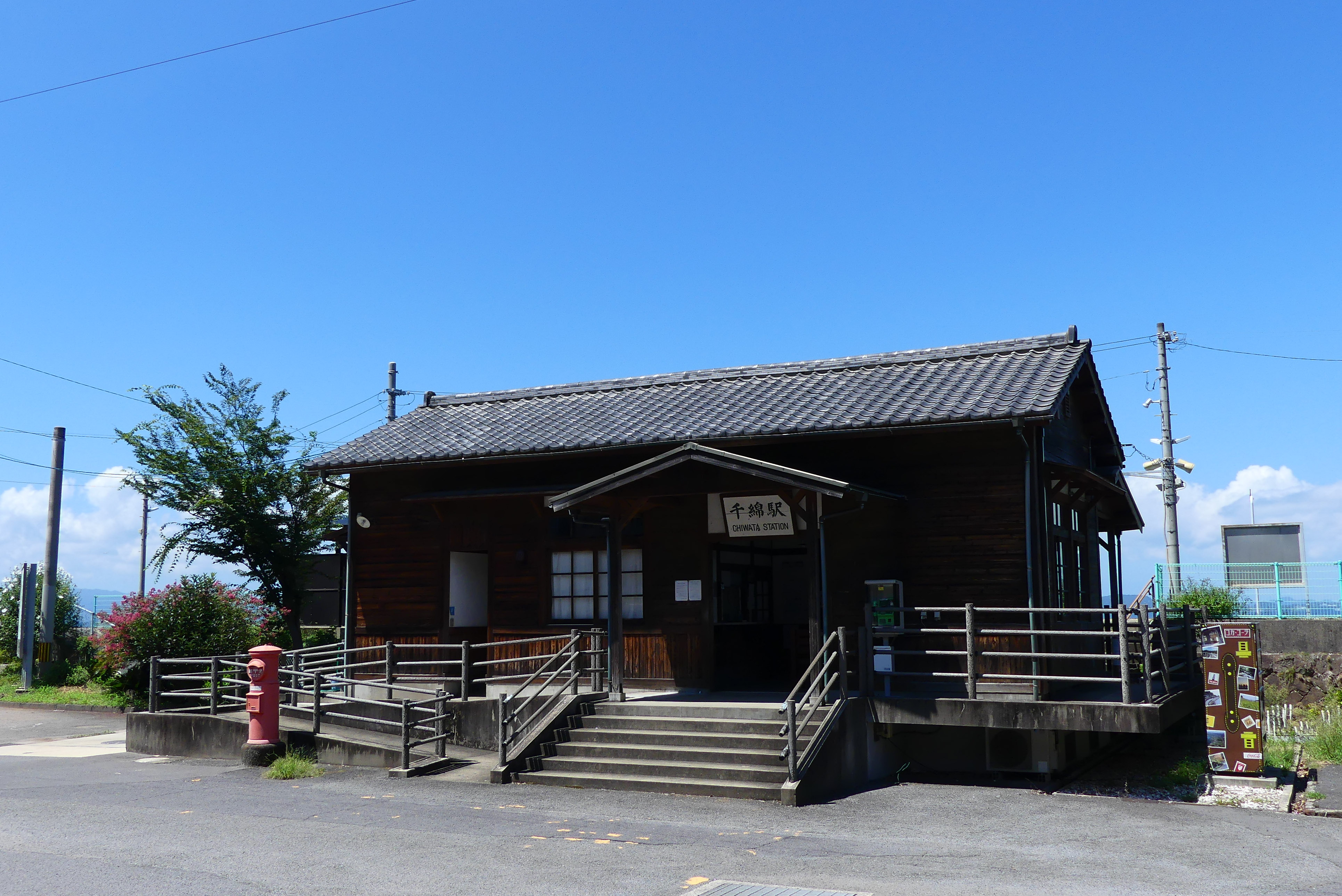
- Chiwata Station in 2017

General information
- Location: Hiranitagou, Higashisonogi-cho, Higashisonogi-gun, Nagasaki-ken 859-3928; Japan
- Coordinates: 33°00′48″N 129°56′45″E
- Operator: JR Kyushu
- Line: ■ Ōmura Line
- Distance: 24.0 km from Haiki
- Platforms: 1 side platform
- Tracks: 1

Construction
- Structure type: At grade
- Parking: Available
- Cycle facilities: Bike shed
- Accessible: Partial - ramp to station but steps to platform

Other information
- Status: Unstaffed, kan'i itaku agent onsite
- Website: Official website

History
- Opened: 20 April 1928

Passengers
- FY2014: 82 daily

Services
Preceding station	JR Kyushu	Following station
Matsubara towards Isahaya	Ōmura Line Local	Sonogi towards Haiki
Location
- Location within Nagasaki Prefecture Location within Japan

Chiwata Station (千綿駅, Chiwata-eki) is a passenger railway station located in the town of Higashisonogi, Nagasaki Prefecture, Japan. It is operated by JR Kyushu.

== Lines ==
The station is served by the Ōmura Line and is located 24.0 km from the starting point of the line at Haiki. Besides the local services on the line, some trains of the Rapid Seaside Liner also stop at the station.

== Station layout ==
The station consists of a side platform serving a single track by the coast of Ōmura Bay. The station building was built in 1928 and is a timber building with a tiled roof of traditional Japanese design. A ramp leads up from the station forecourt to the building but another short flight of steps is needed to access the platform. Parking and a bike shed are available at the station forecourt.

The ticket window is not staffed by JR Kyushu but a kan'i itaku agent has converted the station waiting room into a cafe and also sells some kinds of tickets on site.

== History ==
Japanese Government Railways (JGR) opened the station on 20 April 1928 as an additional station on what was then the Nagasaki Main Line. On 1 December 1934, another route was given the designation Nagasaki Main Line and the track from Haiki, through Chiwata to Isahaya was designated the Ōmura Line. With the privatization of Japanese National Railways (JNR), the successor of JGR, on 1 April 1987, control of the station passed to JR Kyushu.

== Passenger statistics ==
In fiscal 2014, there were a total of 29,848 boarding passengers, giving a daily average of 82 passengers.

== Surrounding area ==
- Japan National Route 34
- Chiwata Post Office
- Higashisonogi Town Chiwata Elementary School

== See also ==
- List of railway stations in Japan
