= Higashisonogi District, Nagasaki =

District in Nagasaki prefecture, Japan

Coordinates: 33.083°N 129.879°E

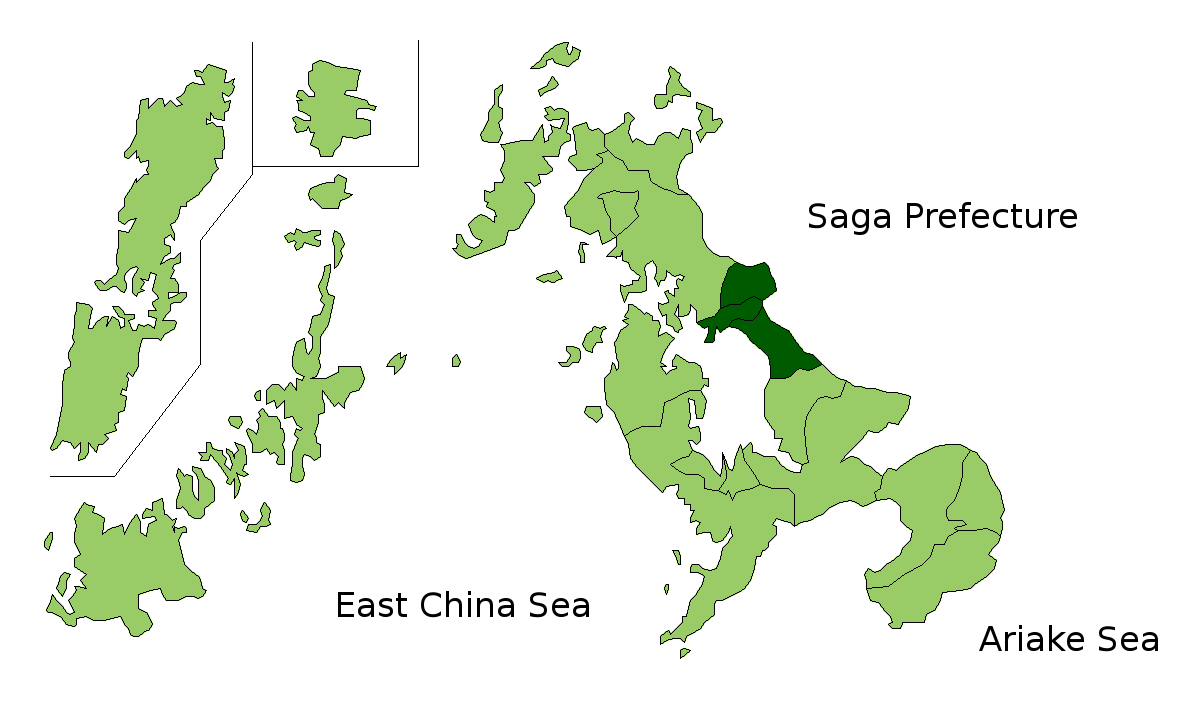
Higashisonogi District in Nagasaki Prefecture.

Higashisonogi (東彼杵郡, Higashisonogi-gun) is a district located in Nagasaki Prefecture, Japan. The towns of Hasami, Higashisonogi, and Kawatana are located within the district.

As of July 1, 2023, the district has an estimated population of 34,224 and a density of 204 persons per km^{2}. The total area is 167.53 km^{2}.

== Towns and villages ==
- Hasami
- Higashisonogi
- Kawatana

== History ==
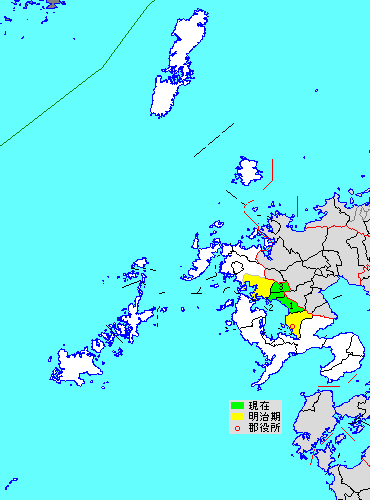
Map of the current towns within the district shown in green (1.Higashisonogi 2.Kawatana 3.Hasami). The yellow area represents the former areas that were within the district during the Meiji era.

Higashisonogi District was established on October 28, 1874 as an administrative division within Sonogi District due to Nagasaki Prefecture enforcing a township law that was passed by the Japanese government. The district comprises today's towns of Hasami, Higashisonogi, Kawatana, parts of Sasebo and the entire city of Omura. The county office was established in Omura (formally known as Omura Town).

In 1902, Sasebo Village was given city status and Sasebo withdrew from the county. In 1942, many towns around Omura merged to become today's Omura City. The city therefore withdrew from the county.
