= Higashisonogi, Nagasaki =

Higashisonogi 東彼杵町
- Town
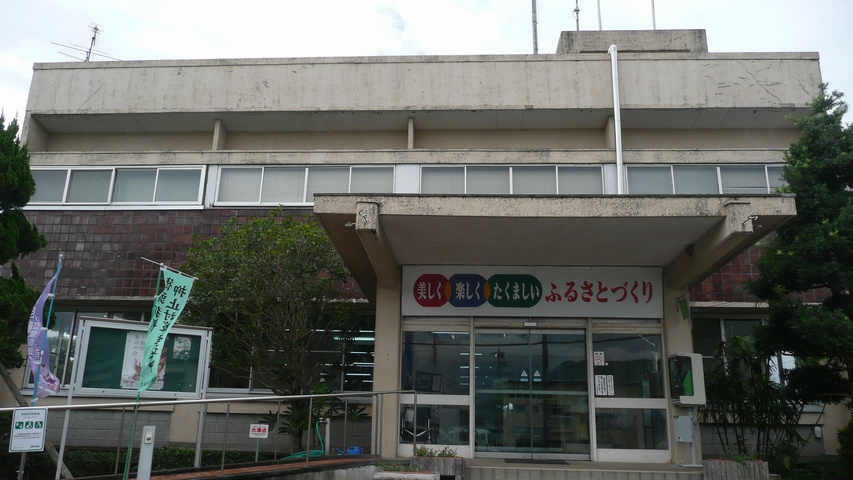
- Higashisonogi Town Office

- Flag Chapter
- Interactive map of Higashisonogi
- Location in Japan
- Coordinates: 33°2′13″N 129°55′2″E
- Country: Japan
- Region: Kyushu
- Prefecture: Nagasaki
- District: Higashisonogi

Area
  - Total: 74.29 km^{2} (28.68 sq mi)

Population (May 31, 2024)
  - Total: 7,383
  - Density: 99.38/km^{2} (257.4/sq mi)
- Time zone: UTC+09:00 (JST)
- City hall address: 1850-6 Kuramoto, Higashisonogi-cho, Higashisonogi-gun, Nagasaki-ken 859-3808
- Website: Official website
- Symbols
- Flower: Cosmos
- Tree: Camphora officinarum

Higashisonogi (東彼杵町, Higashisonogi-chō) is a town located in Higashisonogi District, Nagasaki Prefecture, Japan. As of 31 May 2024, the town had an estimated population of 7,383 in 3203 households, and a population density of 99 people per km^{2}. The total area is 74.29 km^{2} (28.68 sq mi).

== Geography ==
Higashisonogi-cho is located in the center of Nagasaki Prefecture, facing the east side of Ōmura Bay. The entire town is a volcanic hilly area, and the hills extend all the way to the western coast facing Ōmura Bay. To the north are steep mountains such as Mount Kokuzo (608 meters) and Mount Takami-dake (538 meters), and to the south are steep mountains such as Mount Kunimidake (816 meters), Mount Toume (849 meters), and Mount Gundake (826 meters).

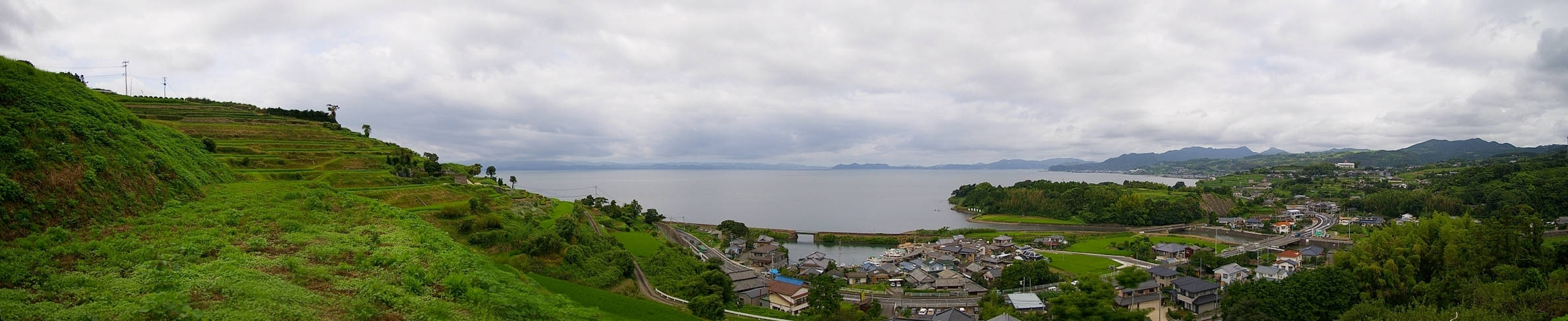
A view from Satogo, Higashisonogi. Omura Bay in the center. National Route 34 and Omura Line extends from the center to the right.

=== Surrounding municipalities ===
Nagasaki Prefecture

- Kawatana
- Ōmura

Saga Prefecture

- Ureshino

=== Climate ===
Higashisonogi has a humid subtropical climate (Köppen Cfa) characterized by warm summers and cool winters with light to no snowfall. The average annual temperature in Higashisonogi is 15.8 °C. The average annual rainfall is 1970 mm with September as the wettest month. The temperatures are highest on average in August, at around 26.2 °C, and lowest in January, at around 5.8 °C.

=== Demographics ===
Per Japanese census data, the population of Higashisonogi is as shown below:

Historical population
Year	Pop.	±%
1960	12,553	—
1970	10,713	−14.7%
1980	10,353	−3.4%
1990	10,188	−1.6%
2000	10,026	−1.6%
2010	8,903	−11.2%
2020	7,721	−13.3%

== History ==
Higashisonogi is part of ancient Hizen Province. The Hisagozuka Kofun, dating from the 5th century, is located in the town. During the Edo Period, the area was under the control of Ōmura Domain. This was the crossing point for the 26 Kirishitan martyrs as they boarded boats at this location and continued across the bay to Nagasaki where they were crucified as an example to all who practiced the Christian faith. After the Meiji restoration, the villages of Sonogi and Chiwata were established with the creation of the modern municipalities system on April 1, 1889. Sonogi was raised to town status on November 3, 1940. Sonogi Town and Chiwata Village merged on May 1, 1959, to form the town of Higashisonogi.

== Government ==
Higashisonogi has a mayor-council form of government with a directly elected mayor and a unicameral town council of 11 members. Higashisonogi contributes one member to the Nagasaki Prefectural Assembly. In terms of national politics, the town is part of the Nagasaki 3rd district of the lower house of the Diet of Japan.

== Economy ==
Traditionally, Higashisonogi was a whaling town and commercial fishing remains a major component of the local economy. Agriculture is centered on rice and most famously, Japanese green tea production. Other industries in the town includes lumber, charcoal production, and livestock.

== Education ==
Higashisonogi has two public elementary schools and one public junior high school operated by the town government, and one private elementary school and one private junior high school. The town does not have a high school.

== Transportation ==
=== Railways ===
(JR Kyushu) - Ōmura Line

- ■ Sonogi - Chiwata

=== Highways ===
- Nagasaki Expressway (Higashi Sonogi IC and Omura Bay PA)
- National Route 34
- National Route 205
