= Takematsu Station =

Railway station in Ōmura, Nagasaki Prefecture, Japan

Takematsu Station 竹松駅
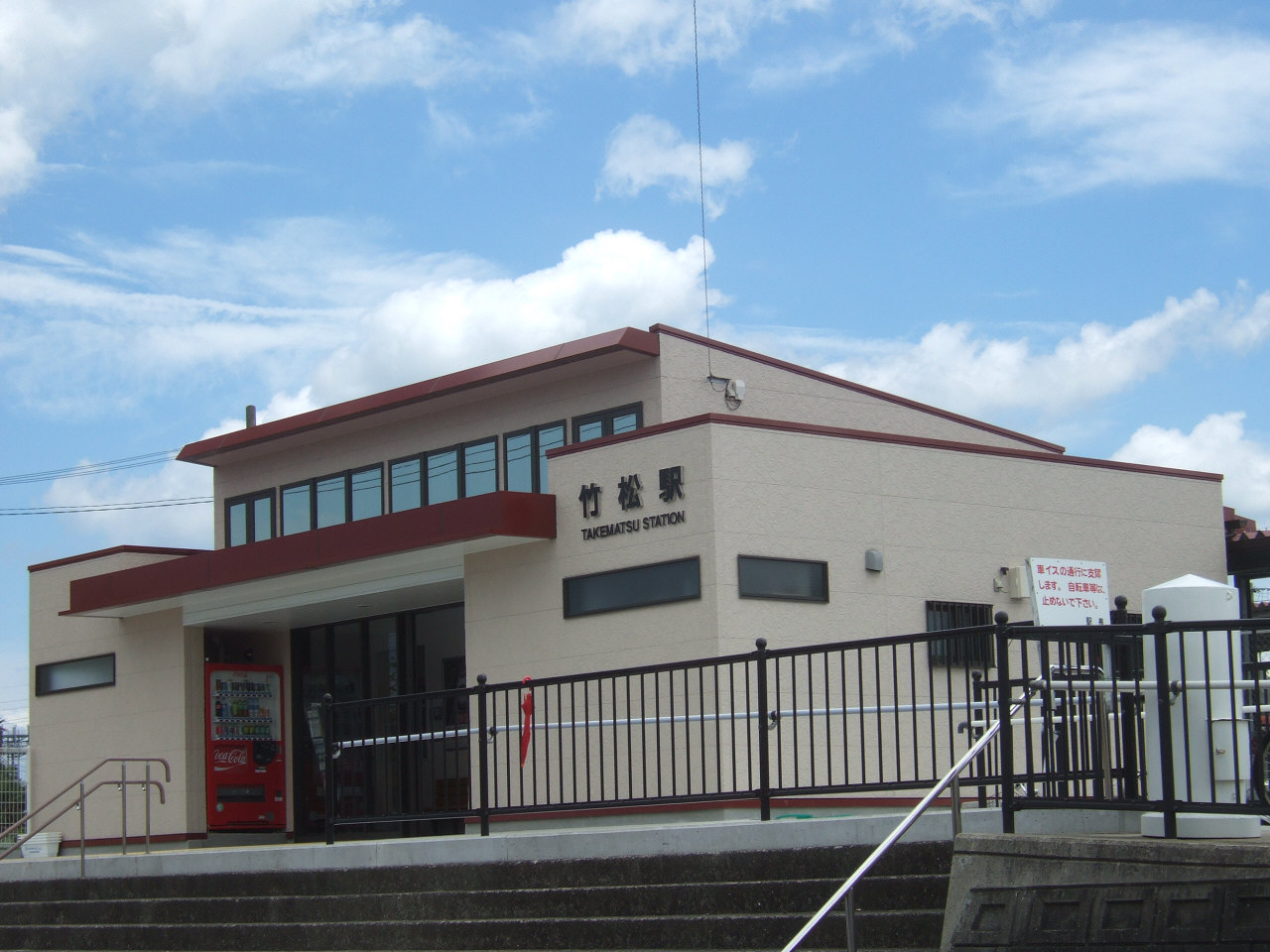
- Takematsu Station in 2008

General information
- Location: Takematsu-hon-machi, Ōmura-shi, Nagasaki-ken 856-0020; Japan
- Coordinates: 32°56′23″N 129°57′12″E
- Operator: JR Kyushu
- Line: ■ Ōmura Line
- Distance: 32.8 km from Haiki
- Platforms: 2 side platforms
- Tracks: 2

Construction
- Structure type: At grade
- Parking: Available
- Accessible: No - platforms linked by level crossing with steps

Other information
- Status: Staffed ticket window (outsourced)
- Website: Official website

History
- Opened: 25 May 1922

Passengers
- FY2020: 945 daily
- Rank: 141st (among JR Kyushu stations)

Services
Preceding station	JR Kyushu	Following station
Shin-Ōmura towards Isahaya	Ōmura Line Local	Ōmura Rail Yard towards Haiki
Shin-Ōmura towards Isahaya	Ōmura Line Seaside Liner	Sonogi towards Haiki
Location
- Location within Nagasaki Prefecture Location within Japan

Takematsu Station (竹松駅, Takematsu-eki) is a passenger railway station located in the city of Ōmura, Nagasaki Prefecture, Japan. It is operated by JR Kyushu.

== Lines ==
The station is served by the Ōmura Line and is located 32.8 km from the starting point of the line at Haiki. Besides the local services on the line, the Rapid Seaside Liner also stops at the station.

== Station layout ==
The station consists of two staggered side platforms serving two tracks. From the forecourt, a flight of steps leads up to the station building, a modern steel-frame structure which houses a staffed ticket window and a waiting room. Access to the opposite side platform is by means of a level crossing with steps at both ends.

Management of the station has been outsourced to the JR Kyushu Tetsudou Eigyou Co., a wholly owned subsidiary of JR Kyushu specialising in station services. It staffs the ticket window which is equipped with a POS machine but does not have a Midori no Madoguchi facility.

=== Platforms ===
1	■ Ōmura Line	for Huis ten Bosch and Sasebo
2	■ Ōmura Line	for Isahaya and Nagasaki

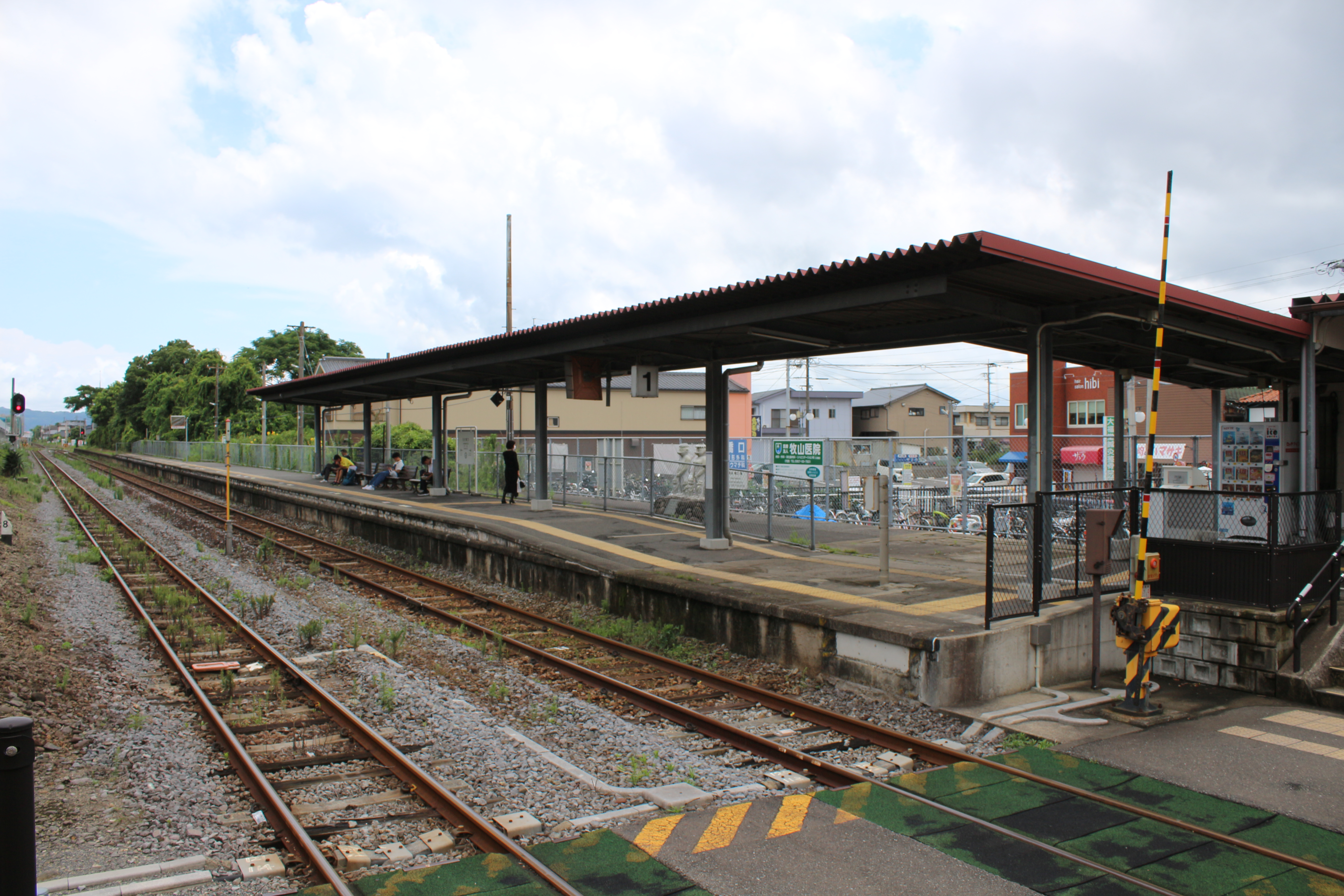
Platform 1

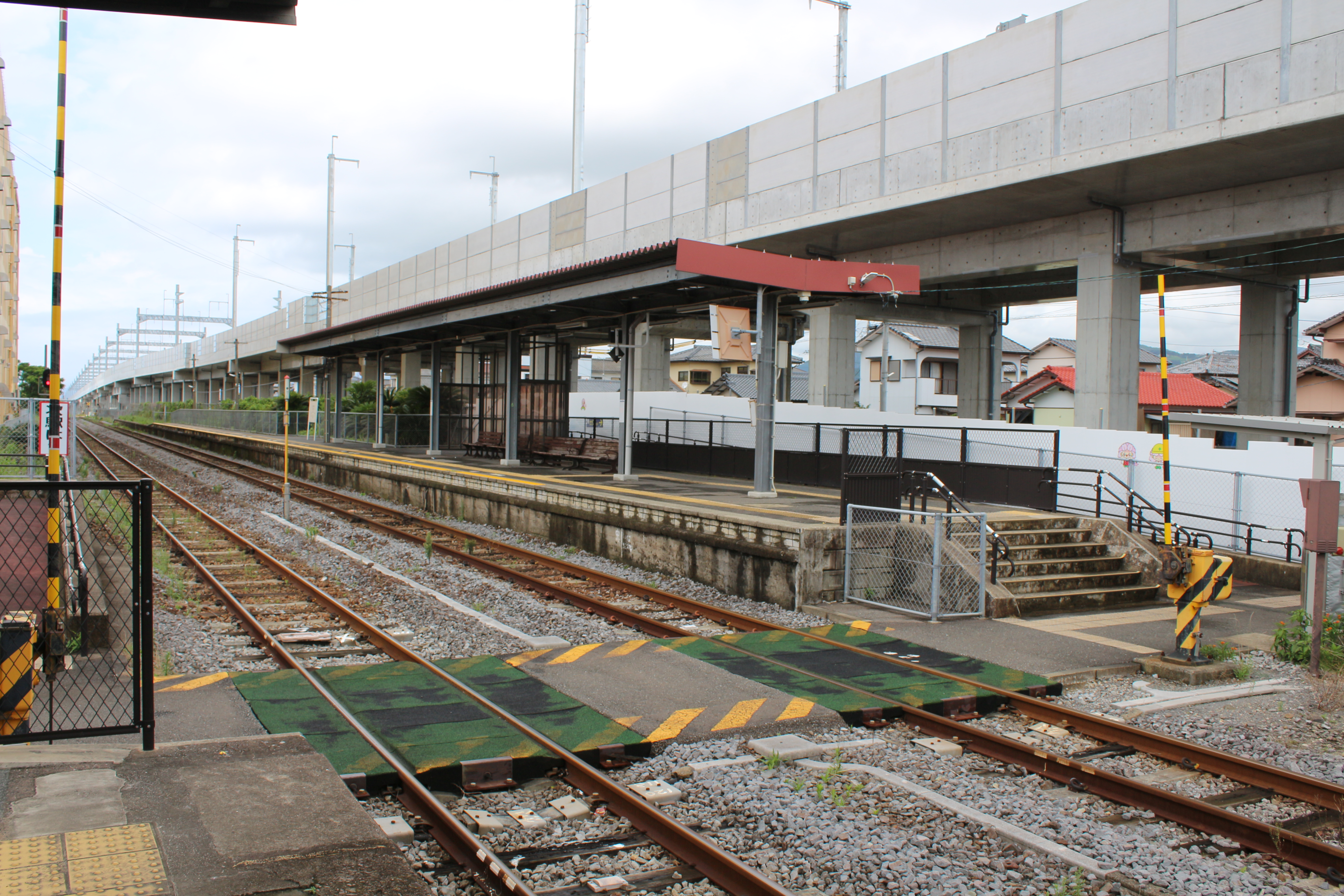
Platform 2

== History ==
Japanese Government Railways (JGR) opened the station on 25 May 1922 as an additional station on what was then the Nagasaki Main Line. On 1 December 1934, another route was given the designation Nagasaki Main Line and the track from Haiki, through Takematsu to Isahaya was designated the Ōmura Line. With the privatization of Japanese National Railways (JNR), the successor of JGR, on 1 April 1987, control of the station passed to JR Kyushu.

== Passenger statistics ==
In fiscal 2020, the station was used by an average of 945 passengers daily (boarding passengers only), and it ranked 141st among the busiest stations of JR Kyushu.

== Surrounding area ==
- National Route 34
- Omura City Takematsu Elementary School
- Omura City Tonohara Elementary School
- Omura City Sakuragahara Junior High School
- Ōmura City Takematsu Branch office
- Shin-Ōmura Station (Kyushu Shinkansen Nagasaki/Nishi-Kyushu Route, in plan)

== See also ==
- List of railway stations in Japan
