= Sonogi Station =

Railway station in Higashisonogi, Nagasaki Prefecture, Japan

Sonogi Station 彼杵駅
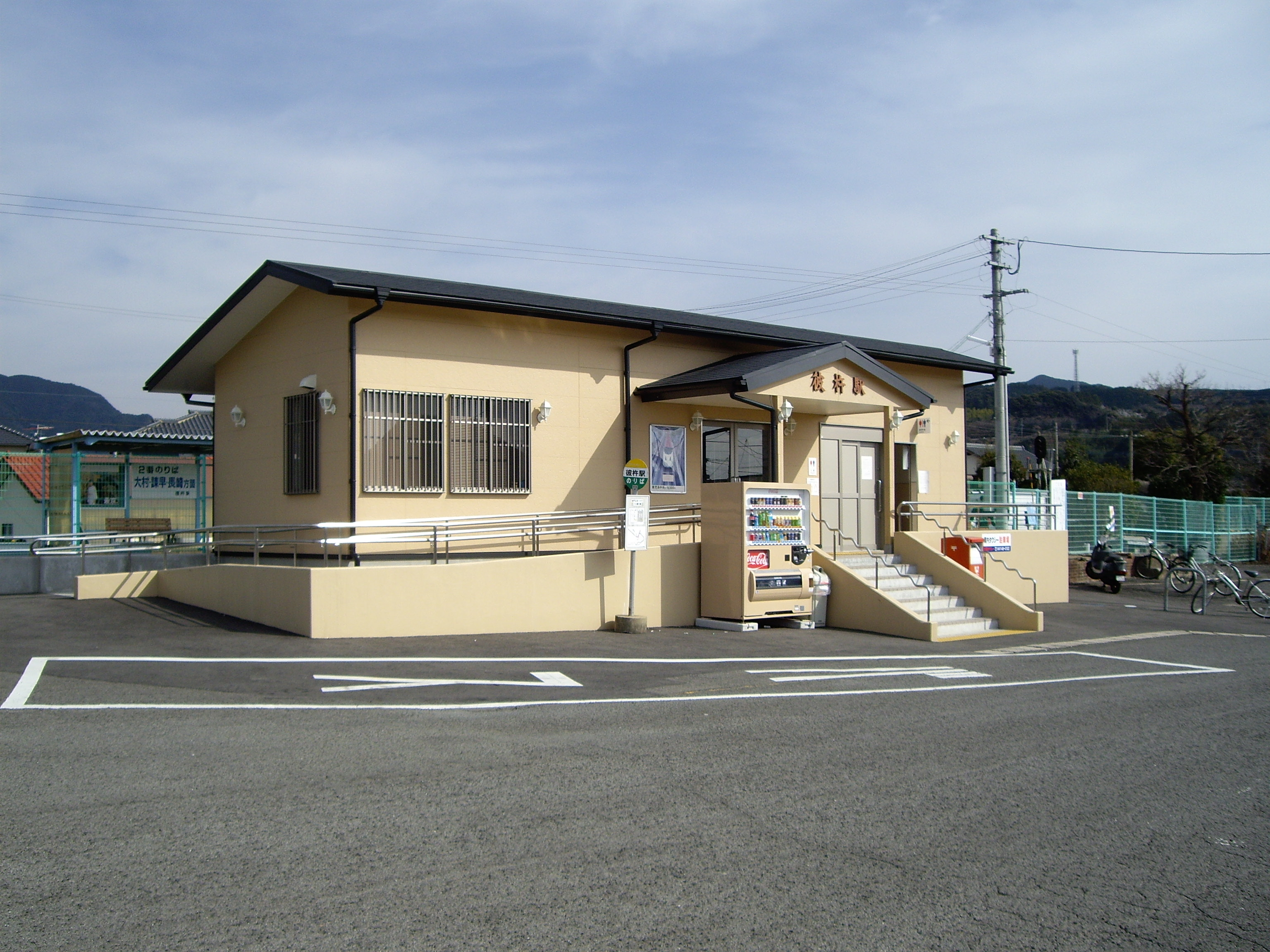

General information
- Location: Kuramoto, Higashisonogi-cho, Higashisonogi-gun, Nagasaki-ken 859-3808; Japan
- Coordinates: 33°02′24″N 129°54′53″E
- Operator: JR Kyushu
- Line: ■ Ōmura Line
- Distance: 19.6 km from Haiki
- Platforms: 2 side platforms
- Tracks: 2

Construction
- Structure type: At grade
- Parking: Available
- Accessible: Yes - platforms linked by level crossing and ramps

Other information
- Status: Staffed ticket window (outsourced)
- Website: Official website

History
- Opened: 20 January 1898

Passengers
- FY2019: 305 daily
- Rank: 298th (among JR Kyushu stations)

Services
Preceding station	JR Kyushu	Following station
Chiwata towards Isahaya	Ōmura Line Local	Kawatana towards Haiki
Takematsu towards Isahaya	Ōmura Line Seaside Liner	Kawatana towards Haiki
Location
- Location within Nagasaki Prefecture Location within Japan

Sonogi Station (彼杵駅, Sonogi-eki) is a passenger railway station located in the town of Higashisonogi, Nagasaki Prefecture, Japan. It is operated by JR Kyushu.

== Lines ==
The station is served by the Ōmura Line and is located 19.6 km from the starting point of the line at Haiki. Besides the local services on the line, the Rapid Seaside Liner also stops at the station.

== Station layout ==
The station consists of two side platforms serving two tracks. The station building is a steel frame structure of modern design and houses a waiting room and staffed ticket window. A ramp leads up to the station building from the forecourt. Access to the opposite site platform is by means of a level crossing with ramps at both ends.

Management of the station has been outsourced to the JR Kyushu Tetsudou Eigyou Co., a wholly owned subsidiary of JR Kyushu specialising in station services. It staffs the ticket window which is equipped with a POS machine but does not have a Midori no Madoguchi facility.

=== Platforms ===
1	■ Ōmura Line	for Sasebo
2	■ Ōmura Line	for Nagasaki

== History ==
The private Kyushu Railway, in building a line to Nagasaki, had opened a track southwards from Tosu to Saga and Takeo (today Takeo-Onsen) by 1895. By 1897, the track had reached Haiki. In the next phase of expansion, the track was extended towards Ōmura which opened as the new terminus on 20 January 1898. Sonogi was opened on the same day as an intermediate station between Haiki and Ōmura. When the Kyushu Railway was nationalized on 1 July 1907, Japanese Government Railways (JGR) took over control of the station. On 12 October 1909, track from Tosu through Haiki to Nagasaki was designated the Nagasaki Main Line. On 1 December 1934, another route was given the designation Nagasaki Main Line and the track from Haiki, through Sonogi to Isahaya was designated the Ōmura Line. With the privatization of Japanese National Railways (JNR), the successor of JGR, on 1 April 1987, control of the station passed to JR Kyushu.

== Passenger statistics ==
In fiscal 2019, the station was used by an average of 305 passengers daily (boarding passengers only), and it ranked 298th among the busiest stations of JR Kyushu.

== Surrounding area ==
- JR Kyushu bus is operated for the Ureshino hot spring and Takeo-Onsen Station from the station square.
- Japan National Route 205
- Sonogi Post Office
- Higashisonogi Town Office

== See also ==
- List of railway stations in Japan
