= Hasami, Nagasaki =

Hasami 波佐見町
- Town
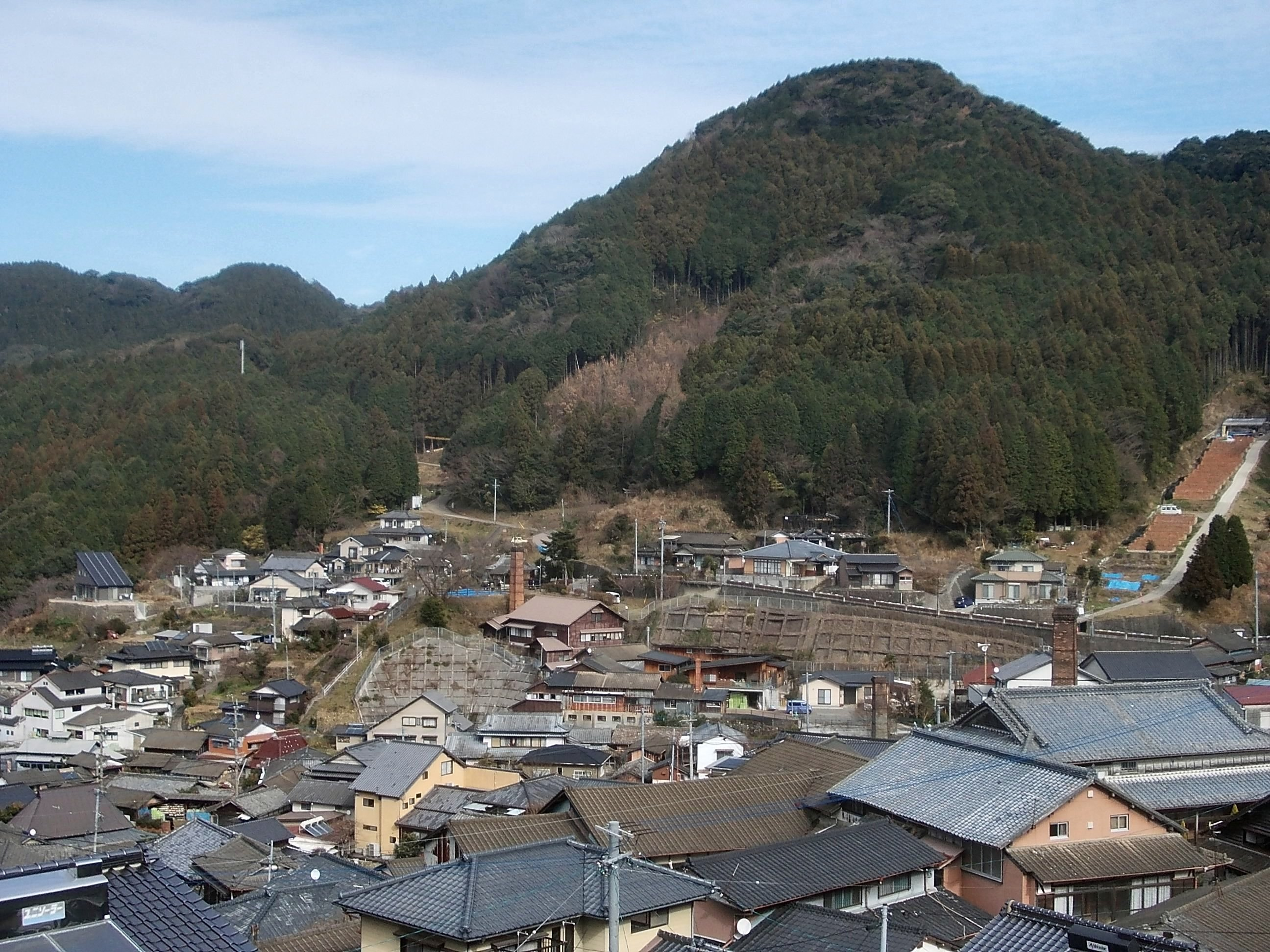
- Hasami Pottery Village panorama

- Flag Seal
- Interactive map of Hasami
- Location in Japan
- Coordinates: 33°8′17″N 129°53′44″E
- Country: Japan
- Region: Kyushu
- Prefecture: Nagasaki
- District: Higashisonogi

Government
  - Mayor: Masata Ichinose

Area
  - Total: 56.00 km^{2} (21.62 sq mi)

Population (March 31, 2024)
  - Total: 14,124
  - Density: 252.2/km^{2} (653.2/sq mi)
- Time zone: UTC+09:00 (JST)
- City hall address: 66 Shukugo, Hasami-cho, Higashisonogi-gun, Nagasaki-ken 859-3791
- Website: Official website
- Symbols
- Flower: Azalea
- Tree: Ilex integra

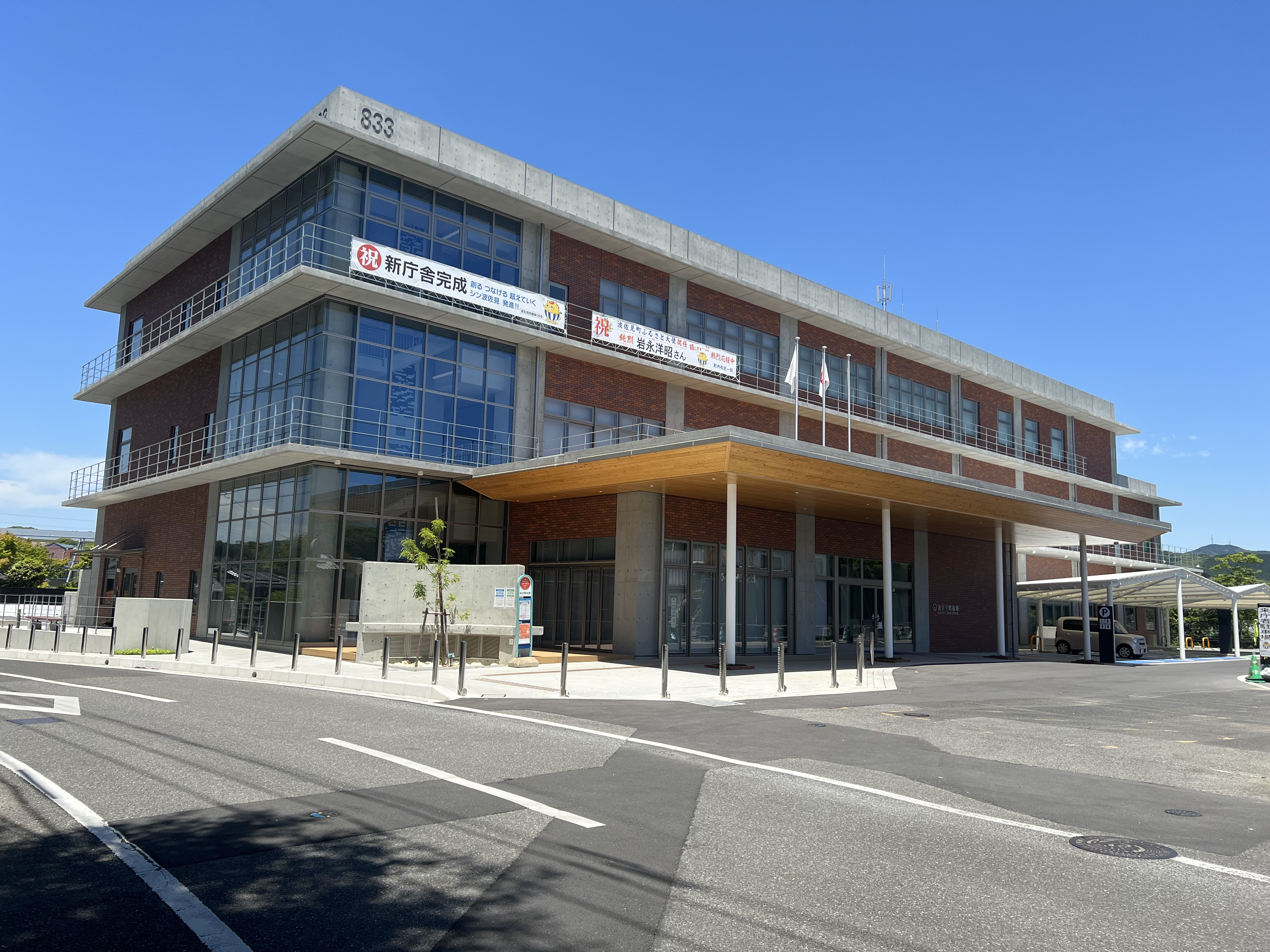
Hasami Town Hall

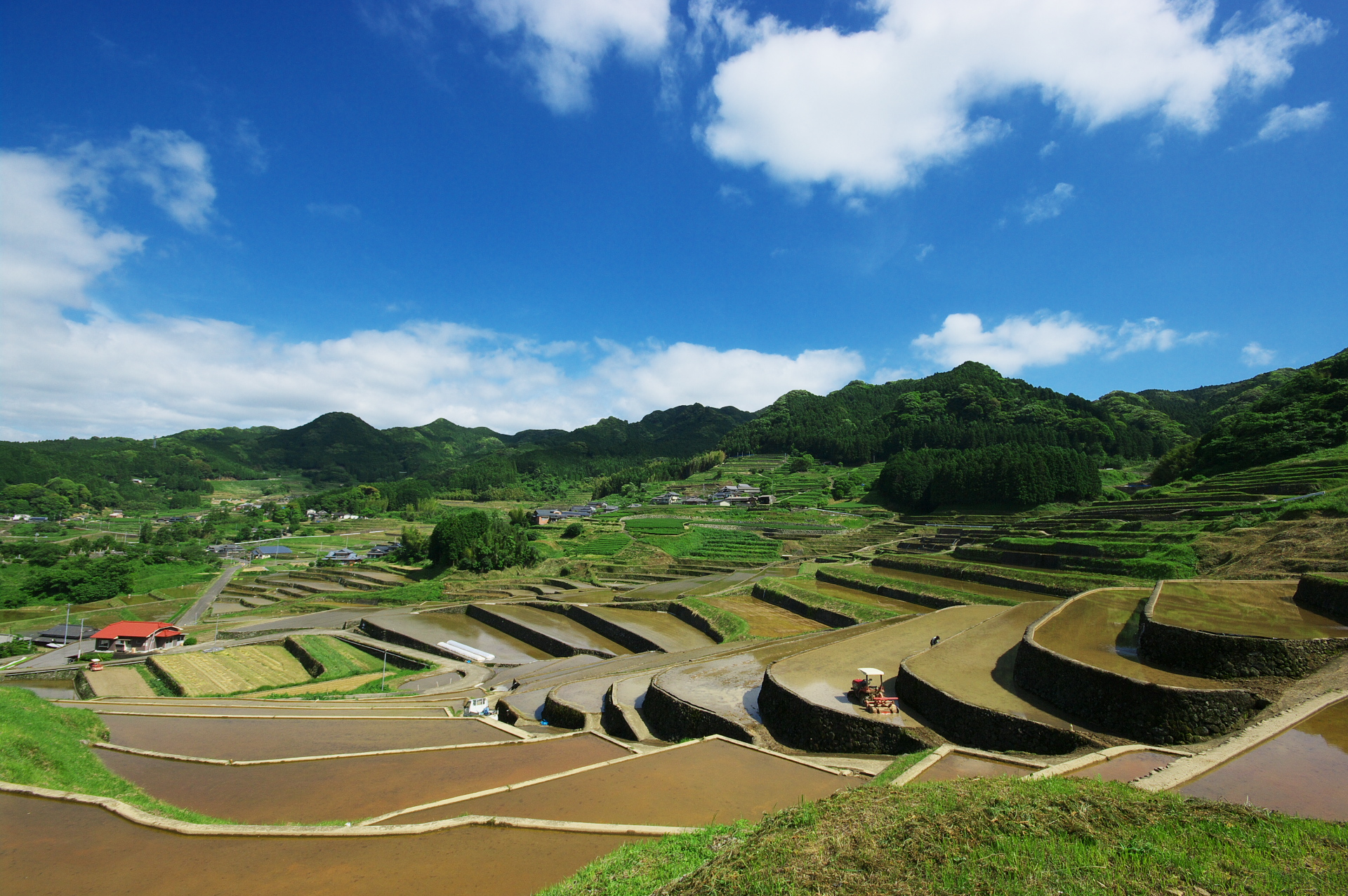
Rice terraces in Hasami

Hasami (波佐見町, Hasami-chō) is a town located in Higashisonogi District, Nagasaki Prefecture, Japan. As of 31 May 2024, the town had an estimated population of 14,124 in 5499 households, and a population density of 200 people per km^{2}. The total area of the town is 56.00 km^{2} (21.62 sq mi). It is known, along with neighboring Arita, Saga Prefecture for its ceramics manufacturing.

== Geography ==
Hasami is located within the central part of Nagasaki prefecture, which is about 20 kilometers from central Sasebo. The town stretches 10.5 km east-to-west, 7.0 km north-to-south. The eastern and northern parts of the town form the prefectural border with Saga prefecture. As it is a basin surrounded by mountains, it is relatively hot in the summer and cold in the winter. It is the only landlocked town in the prefecture.

=== Surrounding municipalities ===
Nagasaki Prefecture

- Kawatana
- Sasebo

Saga Prefecture

- Arita
- Takeo
- Ureshino

=== Climate ===
Hasami has a humid subtropical climate (Köppen Cfa) characterized by warm summers and cool winters with light to no snowfall. The average annual temperature in Hasami is 16.0 °C. The average annual rainfall is 1864 mm with September as the wettest month. The temperatures are highest on average in August, at around 26.6 °C, and lowest in January, at around 6.0 °C.

=== Demographics ===
Per Japanese census data, the population of Hasami is as shown below:

Historical population
Year	Pop.	±%
1940	13,669	—
1950	16,000	+17.1%
1960	15,254	−4.7%
1970	14,673	−3.8%
1980	15,498	+5.6%
1990	15,728	+1.5%
2000	15,462	−1.7%
2010	15,227	−1.5%
2020	14,291	−6.1%

== History ==
The area of Hasami was part of ancient Hizen Province. During the Edo Period, the area was under the control of Ōmura Domain. After the Meiji restoration, the villages of Kamihasami and Shimohasami were established with the creation of the modern municipalities system on April 1, 1889. Kamihasami was raised to town status on November 3, 1934. Kamihasami and Shimohasami merged on June 1, 1956, to form the town of Hasami.

== Government ==
Hasami has a mayor-council form of government with a directly elected mayor and a unicameral town council of 14 members. Hasami, collectively with the town of Kawatana, contributes one member to the Nagasaki Prefectural Assembly. In terms of national politics, the city is part of the Nagasaki 3rd district of the lower house of the Diet of Japan.

== Economy ==
Hasami is best known for Hasami ware, a type of Japanese porcelain dating back 400 years. The techniques were brought to the Hasami area by Korean ceramicist Yi Sam-pyeong, also the creator of Arita ware from nearby Arita. Hasami ware is distinct from Arita ware, but is often confused as pieces were shipped out of Arita or the neighboring port of Imari. Seventeen kilns and pottery houses are active in the village, with an additional five kilns around the neighboring Mt. Nakao. The town hosts both the Hasami Spring Festival, and the Autumn Ceramics Festival in October.

== Education ==
Hasami has three public elementary schools and one public junior high school by the town government, and one public high school operated by the Nagasaki Prefectural Board of Education.

== Transportation ==
=== Railways ===
Hasami does not have any passenger rail service. The closest stations are Arita Station in the city of Arita, Saga and Kawatana Station in the town of Kawatana, Nagasaki.

=== Highways ===
- Nishi-Kyushu Expressway (Hasami-Arita IC)

== Sister cities ==
Hasami has one sister city and one friendship city relationship:

- Mauá, Brazil (since 2 April 1988)

=== Friendship cities ===
- Gangjin County, South Korea (since 20 October 2010)

== Local attractions ==
- Hizen Hasami Pottery Kiln Sites, National Historic Site

== Notable people from Hasami ==
- Hiroaki Iwanaga, actor
