= Ōmura, Nagasaki =

Ōmura 大村市
- City
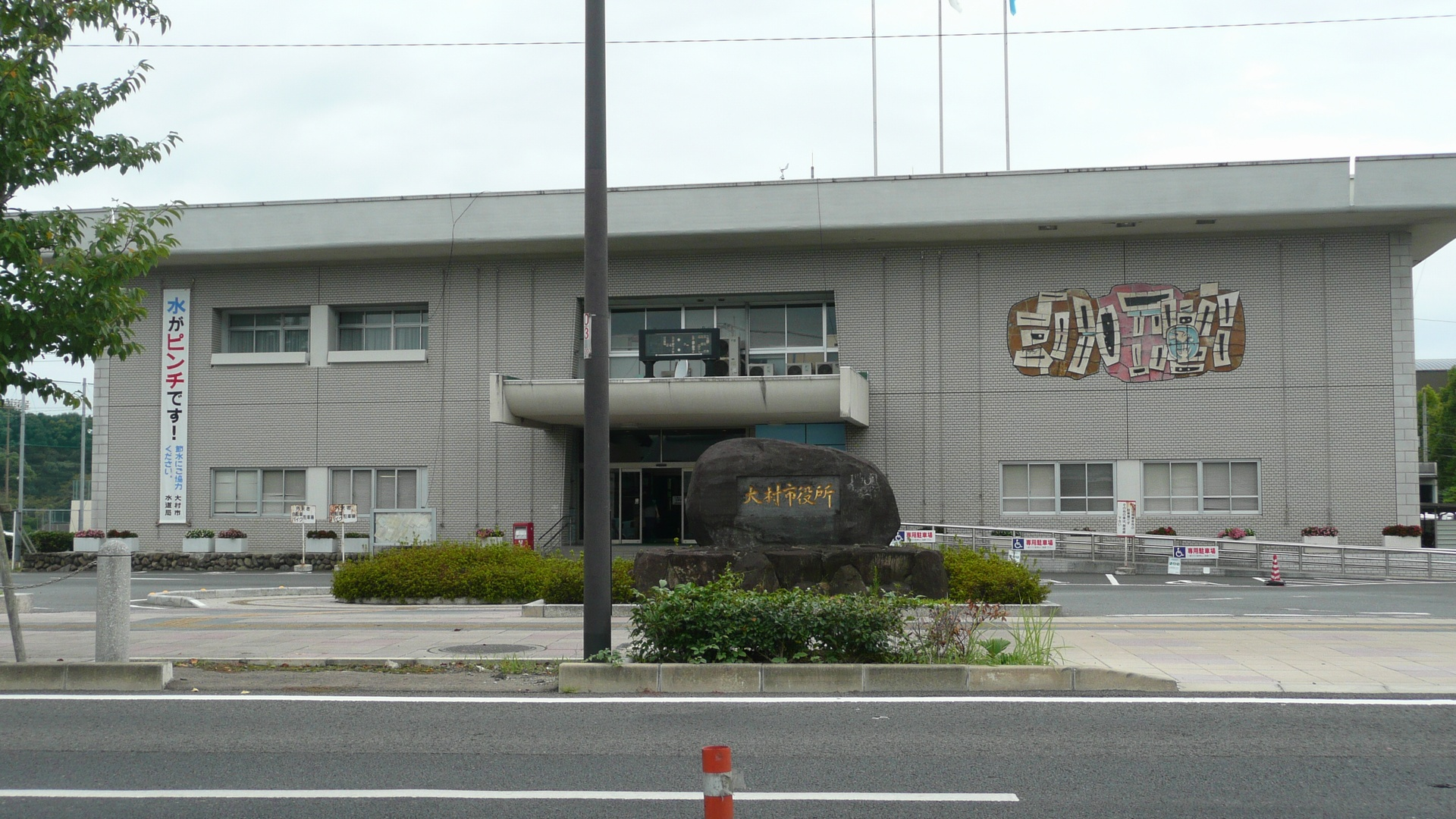
- Ōmura City Hall

- Flag Emblem
- Location of Ōmura in Nagasaki Prefecture

- Location in Japan
- Coordinates: 32°54′0″N 129°57′30″E
- Country: Japan
- Region: Kyushu
- Prefecture: Nagasaki

Government
  - Mayor: Hiroshi Sonoda

Area
  - Total: 126.73 km^{2} (48.93 sq mi)

Population (June 30, 2024)
  - Total: 99,337
  - Density: 783.85/km^{2} (2,030.2/sq mi)
- Time zone: UTC+09:00 (JST)
- City hall address: 1-25 Kushima, Omura-shi, Nagasaki-ken 856-8686
- Climate: Cfa
- Website: Official website
- Symbols
- Flower: Omura sakura
- Tree: Quercus gilva

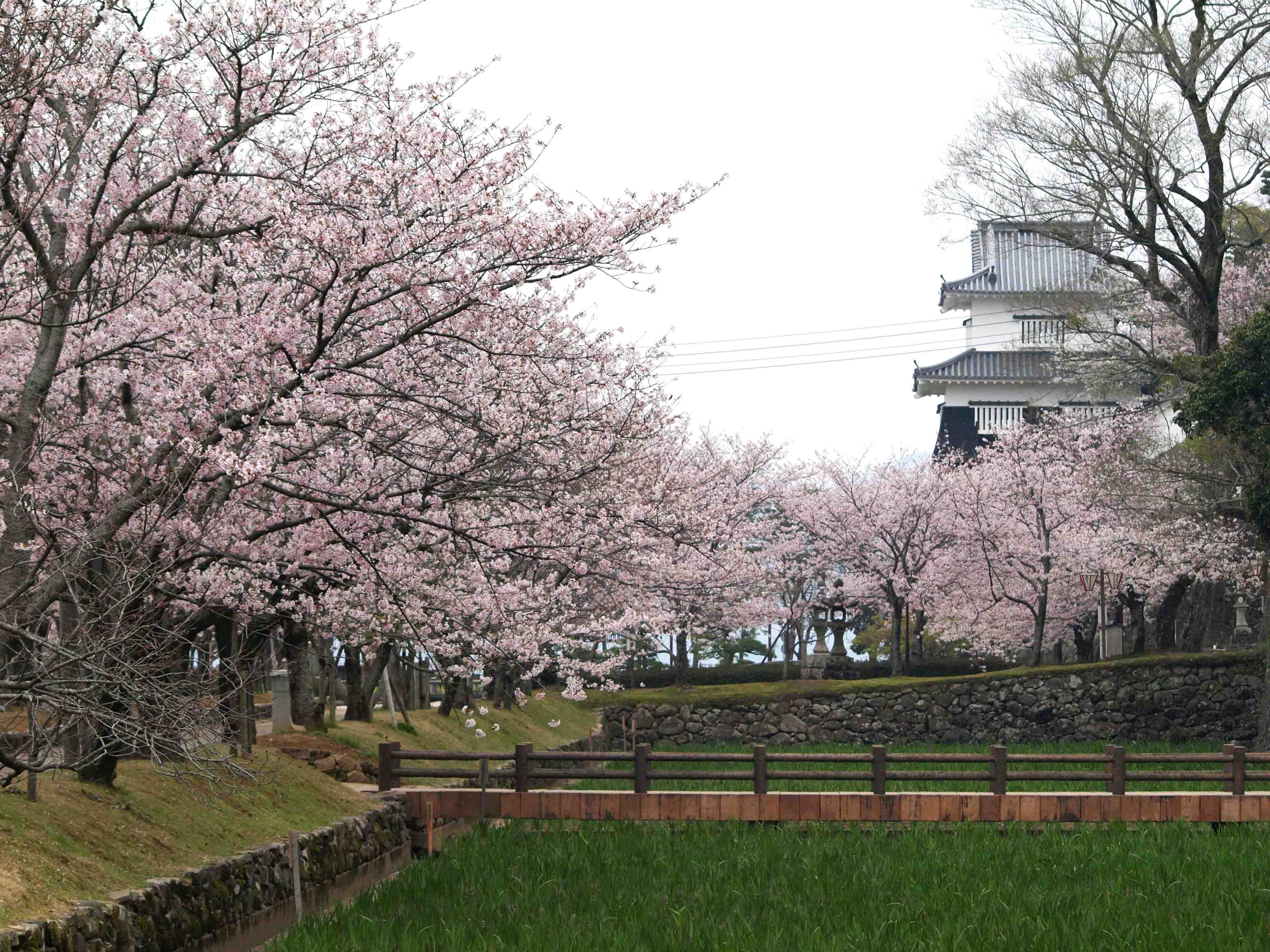
Ōmura park

Ōmura (大村市, Ōmura-shi) is a city located in Nagasaki Prefecture, Japan. As of June 1, 2024, the city had an estimated population of 99,337, and a population density of 780 people per km^{2}. The total area of the city is 126.73 km^{2} (48.93 sq mi)

== History ==
Ōmura is located in former Hizen Province. It developed in the Edo Period as the castle town of Ōmura Domain, ruled by the local Ōmura clan for over 900 years. It was the site of considerable foreign trade and missionary activity during the late Muromachi period, and the Catholic saint Marina de Omura hails from this city. Due to its proximity to the trading settlement at Dejima in Nagasaki, was one of the first areas of Japan to re-open to foreign contact after the end of the national seclusion policy after the Meiji restoration. In the opera Madama Butterfly, set in nearby Nagasaki, the place name Omara in the line "ed alla damigella Butterfly del quartiere d'Omara Nagasaki" probably refers to Ōmura. From 1868-1945, Ōmura was host to numerous military facilities as part of the Sasebo Naval District, most notably that of a major air base for the Imperial Japanese Navy Air Service. The former naval base was the location of the squalid Ōmura Migrant Detention Center, where mainly Korean refugees—termed "stowaways" (mikkōsha synonymous with "smuggler")—were held until deportation, frequently for several years. Since August 1996 the nearby Ōmura Immigration Reception Center in a modern building serves the same function.

The town of Ōmura and the villages of Ōmura, Nishi-Ōmura, Takematsu, Kayase, Fukushige, Matsubara, Miura, Suzuta were established with the creation of the modern municipalities system on April 1, 1889. Ōmura annexed Ōmura village on April 1, 1925 and Nishi-Ōmura and Takematsu Village on November 3, 1939. On February 11, 1942 Ōmura merged with Miura, Suzuta, Kayase, Fukushige, and Matsubara to form the city of Ōmura. The city was largely destroyed by American bombing in 1944. After the war, Omura hosted Japan's first motorboat racing event in 1952. Additionally in 1975, the city opened the world's first island airport; Nagasaki Airport which is located offshore in Ōmura Bay. The airport was constructed by reclaiming land on Minoshima Island after the island's residents agreed to relocate to replace the former airport which is now used by the Japan Maritime Self-Defense Force.

== Geography ==
Ōmura is located on the eastern shore of Ōmura Bay, at the western foot of the Tara mountain range. The Ōmura Plain is one of the few large areas of flat land in Nagasaki Prefecture and the main urban area is on an alluvial fan of the Kori River and Ojoto River. The eastern part of the city is dominated by the steep mountains of the Tara mountain range, with the 1,076 meter Mount Kyogatake as the highest point, and deep valleys carved by the various rivers.

=== Surrounding municipalities ===
Nagasaki Prefecture

- Higashisonogi
- Isahaya

Saga Prefecture

- Kashima
- Tara
- Ureshino

=== Climate ===
Ōmura has a humid subtropical climate (Köppen:Cfa) with hot summers and cool winters. The average annual temperature in Ōmura is 17.3 °C (63.1 °F). The average annual rainfall is 1,811.1 mm (71.30 in) with June and July as the wettest month. The temperatures are highest on average in August, at around 28.3 °C (82.9 °F), and lowest in January, at around 6.7 °C (44.1 °F). Its record high is 39.4 °C (102.9 °F), reached on 3 August 2026, and its record low is −6.2 °C (20.8 °F), reached on 25 January 2016.

Climate data for Ōmura (1996−2020 normals, extremes 1996−present)
Month	Jan	Feb	Mar	Apr	May	Jun	Jul	Aug	Sep	Oct	Nov	Dec	Year
Record high °C (°F)	20.3 (68.5)	22.0 (71.6)	25.0 (77.0)	28.3 (82.9)	31.7 (89.1)	36.2 (97.2)	37.2 (99.0)	39.4 (102.9)	38.1 (100.6)	32.2 (90.0)	27.6 (81.7)	24.9 (76.8)	39.4 (102.9)
Mean daily maximum °C (°F)	10.5 (50.9)	12.0 (53.6)	15.5 (59.9)	20.3 (68.5)	24.6 (76.3)	27.3 (81.1)	30.8 (87.4)	32.6 (90.7)	29.3 (84.7)	24.5 (76.1)	18.6 (65.5)	12.9 (55.2)	21.6 (70.8)
Daily mean °C (°F)	6.7 (44.1)	7.6 (45.7)	10.7 (51.3)	15.2 (59.4)	19.7 (67.5)	23.3 (73.9)	27.1 (80.8)	28.3 (82.9)	25.0 (77.0)	20.0 (68.0)	14.4 (57.9)	9.0 (48.2)	17.3 (63.1)
Mean daily minimum °C (°F)	2.9 (37.2)	3.5 (38.3)	6.2 (43.2)	10.8 (51.4)	15.5 (59.9)	20.0 (68.0)	24.3 (75.7)	25.1 (77.2)	21.6 (70.9)	15.9 (60.6)	10.4 (50.7)	5.3 (41.5)	13.5 (56.2)
Record low °C (°F)	−6.2 (20.8)	−4.7 (23.5)	−0.9 (30.4)	2.7 (36.9)	7.7 (45.9)	12.8 (55.0)	18.0 (64.4)	19.1 (66.4)	13.3 (55.9)	7.6 (45.7)	2.1 (35.8)	−2.4 (27.7)	−6.2 (20.8)
Average precipitation mm (inches)	57.4 (2.26)	77.4 (3.05)	112.6 (4.43)	143.5 (5.65)	158.0 (6.22)	305.5 (12.03)	305.5 (12.03)	221.1 (8.70)	179.7 (7.07)	94.3 (3.71)	88.3 (3.48)	67.7 (2.67)	1,811.1 (71.30)
Average precipitation days (≥ 1.0 mm)	8.0	8.3	10.2	9.2	8.7	12.7	11.0	10.2	9.0	5.8	7.9	8.1	109.1
Source: Japan Meteorological Agency

== Demographics ==
Per Japanese census data, the population of Ōmura in 2022 is 98,237 people. Ōmura has been conducting censuses since 1960. Although the city's population declined slightly in the 1960s, Ōmura's population has been growing since 1970.

Historical population

Year	Pop.	±%
1960	59,752	—
1965	56,425	−5.6%
1970	56,538	+0.2%
1975	60,919	+7.7%
1980	65,538	+7.6%
1985	69,472	+6.0%
1990	73,435	+5.7%

Year	Pop.	±%
1995	79,279	+8.0%
2000	84,414	+6.5%
2005	88,040	+4.3%
2010	90,528	+2.8%
2015	92,757	+2.5%
2020	95,397	+2.8%

Ōmura population statistics

== Government ==
Ōmura has a mayor-council form of government with a directly elected mayor and a unicameral city council of 25 members. Ōmura contributes three members to the Nagasaki Prefectural Assembly. In terms of national politics, the city is part of the Nagasaki 3rd district of the lower house of the Diet of Japan.

== Economy ==
Ōmura has a mixed economy, with the manufacture of refractory bricks as a major industry. Dairy and poultry farming, as well as cultured pearls are also of importance. However, due to its proximity to the larger urban centers of Nagasaki and Sasebo, Ōmura also serves as bedroom community for both cities.

Oriental Air Bridge, a regional airline, is headquartered in the city. At one time J-Air had its headquarters at the airport.

== Education ==
Ōmura has 15 public elementary schools and six public junior high schools operated by the town government, and three public high schools operated by the Nagasaki Prefectural Board of Education. There is also one private high school. The Nagasaki-based Kwassui Women's University has a campus in Ōmura.

== Transportation ==
=== Airport ===
- Nagasaki Airport

=== Railways ===
JR Kyushu - Nishi Kyushu Shinkansen

Shin-Ōmura

JR Kyushu - Ōmura Line

- ■ Matsubara - Ōmura Rail Yard - Takematsu - Shin-Ōmura - Suwa - Ōmura - Iwamatsu

=== Highways ===
- Nagasaki Expressway
- National Route 34
- National Route 444

== Sister cities ==
- Itami, Hyōgo, Japan
- (United States) San Carlos, California, USA
- Semboku, Akita, Japan
- Sintra, Portugal

=== Friendship cities ===
- Minhang District, Shanghai, China

== Sports ==
Ōmura hosted the official 2011 FIBA Asia Championship for Women.

== Notable people from Ōmura ==
- Hantaro Nagaoka, Meiji-era physicist
- Anza Ohyama, singer and stage actress
- Masaki Okino, footballer
- Taira Shige, footballer
