= Public–private partnerships in the United States =

Public–private partnerships (PPP or P3) are cooperative arrangements between two or more public and private sectors, typically of a long-term nature. In the United States, they mostly took the form of toll roads concessions, community post offices and urban renewal projects. In recent years, there has been interest in expanding P3s to multiple infrastructure projects, such as schools, universities, government buildings, waste and water. Reasons for expanding public-private partnership in the United States were initially cost-cutting and concerns about Public debt. In the early 2000s, P3s were implemented sporadically by different States and municipalities with little federal guidance. During Obama's second term, multiple policies were adopted to facilitate P3 projects, and Congress passed bills in that direction with overwhelming bipartisan support. My Brother's Keeper Challenge is an example of a public–private partnership. Some Private-public partnerships were carried out without incident, while others have attracted much controversy.

== Origins ==
Public-private partnerships in America have existed in one form of another since the beginning of the colonial period, as colonial charters were based on a partnership between the British Crown and a company responsible for colonisation. Much of the early infrastructure of the United States was built by what can be considered public-private partnerships. This includes the Philadelphia and Lancaster Turnpike road in Pennsylvania, which was initiated in 1792, an early steamboat line between New York and New Jersey in 1808; many of the railroads, including the nation's first railroad, chartered in New Jersey in 1815; and most of the modern electric grid. In the mid to late nineteenth century, toll roads concessions were first introduced in the United States, and this became a prevalent form of P3s in the country during the 20th century. P3s in the United States are also "traditionally associated with urban renewal and downtown economic development".

The prevalence of Public-Private Partnerships in public infrastructure increased around the world during the 1990s and 2000s. This was particularly the case in countries such as the United Kingdom, Canada and Australia, with strong encouragements from their national governments. The United States did not take part of this worldwide trend partly because the federal and States government traditionally had a small role in these areas, with public infrastructure projects being mostly funded through a well-functioning municipal bonds system. However, the United States became friendlier to P3s during Obama's second term, with the adoption of the Fixing America's Surface Transportation Act (FAST) and the Water Infrastructure Finance and Innovation Act (WIFIA) by Congress. The Department of Transportation also created the Build America Transportation Investment Center (BATIC) to help P3s access federal credit and facilitate their implementation.

== Motivations ==
Pressure to sign Asset Montization P3 deals and to change the standard funding model for infrastructure projects arise from concerns about the level of public debt.

U.S. city managers' motivations for exploring P3s vary. According to a 2007 survey, two primary reasons were expressed: cost reduction (86.7%) and external fiscal pressures, including tax restrictions (50.3%). No other motivations expressed exceeded 16%. In the 2012 survey, however, interest had shifted to the need for better processes (69%), relationship building (77%), better outcomes (81%), leveraging resources (84%), and belief that P3s are "the right thing to do" (86%)." Among those surveyed, the provision of public services through contracts with private firms peaked in 1977, at 18%, and has declined since. The most common form of shared service delivery now involves contracts between governments, growing from 17% in 2002 to 20% in 2007. "At the same time, approximately 22% of the local governments in the survey indicated that they had brought back in-house at least one service that they had previously provided through some alternative private arrangement.

There has been proposals to reform social security and emergency services in the United States by transforming them into public-private partnerships to ensure their continued funding.

== Asset Monetization ==
A form of P3 that became prevalent in American cities during the 21st century are asset monetization arrangements. They concerns a city's revenue-generating assets (Parking lots, garage and meters, public lights, toll roads, etc.) and transforms them into financial assets that the city can lease to a private corporation in exchange for operation and maintenance. These deals are usually done during periods of financial distress for the city, and the immediate revenues municipalities receive in these deals is used to pay down the debt or to fill budget holes. The 2014 Detroit bankruptcy deal included many of such Asset Monetization arrangements.

== Social impact bonds ==
Social impact bonds (also called Pay for Success bonds) are "a public-private partnership which funds effective social services through a performance-based contract." They operate over a fixed period of time, but they do not offer a fixed rate of return. Repayment to investors is contingent upon specified social outcomes being achieved.

Social impact bonds have generated a particularly large amount of interest in the United States. In February 2011, Barack Obama's proposed 2012 budget stated that up to $100m would be freed up to run social impact bond pilot schemes. In August, 2012, Massachusetts became the first state in the nation to create a policy to encourage the creation of Social impact bonds, which they call "social innovation financing". The state legislature authorised spending up to $50 million on the initiatives.

The U.S. Department of Justice gave "Priority Consideration" to Fiscal Year 2012 Second Chance Act grant applications that include a Pay for Success component. The Second Chance Act (P.L. 110–199) authorizes federal grants to support services that help reduce recidivism. In 2013, the U.S. Department of Labor awarded nearly $24 million in grants for Pay for Success projects that provide employment services to formerly incarcerated individuals in order to increase employment and reduce recidivism.

The U.S. Department of Housing and Urban Development (HUD) announced in 2013 it will provide $5 billion in grant dollars to assist in the rebuilding and strengthening effort following Hurricane Sandy and encouraged the five states impacted by the storm to make use of Pay for Success strategies where appropriate. In 2013, the Department of the Treasury issued a Request for Information (RFI) that will help design a proposed $300 million Incentive Fund to further expand Pay for Success. The Fund is intended to encourage cities, states and nonprofits to test new Pay for Success models. This same Fund was also part of the President's commitment of nearly $500 million in the 2013 Budget to expand Pay for Success strategies.

== California ==
The California Fuel Cell Partnership (CaFCP) is a public-private partnership to promote hydrogen vehicles (including cars and buses) in California. It is notable as one of the first initiatives for that purpose undertaken in the United States. The challenge is which come first, hydrogen cars or filling stations.

San Diego has entered into numerous PPP agreements. "San Diego has used P3s more extensively and, with Petco Park, on a larger scale than is typical of cities elsewhere". One explanation for San Diego's propensity towards P3 agreements is "...local residents refuse to tax themselves to pay for public benefits and prefer private-sector actors to take the lead...". "...tax shares are usually linear functions of property values..., jurisdictions have an incentive to try to exclude those who would have below-average property values. The incentive leads to such local policies as minimum lot sizes, restrictions on multiple-unit dwellings, and restrictive building codes...One social cost if these policies is a reduction in housing opportunities for low- and middle-income families"

In April 2013, Social Finance US and Collective Health launched an asthma management demonstration project in Fresno, California. Fresno is one of the nation's asthma hot spots; around 20 percent of its children have been diagnosed with the disease, which takes an especially heavy toll among poor communities. Two service providers Central California Asthma Collaborative and Clinica Sierra Vista, will work with the families of 200 low-income children with asthma to provide home care, education, and support in reducing environmental triggers ranging from cigarette smoke to dust mites.

== Illinois ==
Facing a budget crisis in 2005, the city of Chicago entered multiple infrastructure asset monetization P3 deals. These deals were signed with multinational institutional investors and carried out in haste, with final deals being struck days after the start of negotiations. Subsequent municipal Inspector general's reports on the Parking concessions found the City significantly underpriced the value of these assets in these deals.

Chicago's asset monetization deals
Concession	Duration	Sold for	Subsequent valuation
Chicago Skyway toll road	99 years	$1.83 Billion	$2.83 Billion (2015)
Downtown parking garages	99 years	$563 Million	$2.13 Billion (together over the next 75 years)
Public parking meters	75 years	$1.15 Billion	$2.13 Billion (together over the next 75 years)

On 5 May 2014, the State of Illinois announced the state's first Pay for Success (PFS) contract will increase support for at-risk youth who are involved in both the child welfare and juvenile justice systems in Illinois. The first contract awarded under this innovative initiative will go to One Hope United, in partnership with the Conscience Community Network (CCN).

== Louisiana ==
Billy Nungesser, the lieutenant governor of Louisiana, proposed in 2017 that public–private partnerships be established for many of his state's financially strapped state parks, which fall under his jurisdiction, particularly citing two popular facilities in Sabine Parish: North Toledo Bend State Park and Hodges Gardens State Park, at which operating costs vastly outstrip revenues from the $1 park admission fees. Because of recurring state financial issues, the fate of state parks in Louisiana remain in doubt after July 1, 2017.

== Massachusetts ==
In Massachusetts, arrangements to allow the state Department of Conservation and Recreation to pave over gravel utility roads under high-voltage transmission lines operated by utilities have been branded by the Baker Administration and Eversource Energy as "public-private partnerships" to create alternative transportation corridors. This particular arrangement involves no financial risk to the for-profit utility. Where the utility has existing easements, they share the right-of-way. Where the utility does not have an existing easement but wishes to gain state approval for constructing new transmission lines on state property, the utility reproduces designs of rail trails in its petition to the state Energy Facilities Siting Board (EFSB). Approval would enable the utility to have construction of transmission lines and gravel utility paths fully funded through electric ratepayer bills. "Piggybacking" onto an electric 'reliability' project leverages the rights of the for-profit 'public utility' to overcome environmental and zoning bylaws which a rail trail might otherwise be subject to. The legality of steering greenfield transmission projects into environmentally sensitive conservation and wetlands, and using electric ratepayer funds for non-reliability purposes is being tested. In a related case, the Massachusetts Supreme Judicial Court ruled that electricity customers can no longer be asked to help cover the costs of building gas pipelines.

On 1 August 2012, the Commonwealth of Massachusetts announced that Third Sector Capital Partners will serve as lead intermediary, in partnership with New Profit Inc., for the youth recidivism initiative. Roca, United Way of Massachusetts Bay and Merrimack Valley, and Youth Options Unlimited will also participate in the youth recidivism project. The program, called Social Innovation Financing, operates on a simple "pay for success" model, in which nonprofits must demonstrate that by keeping youth from being reincarcerated. According to the state's press release, the juvenile justice contract "will be designed with the specific goal of reducing recidivism and improving education and employment outcomes over several years for a significant segment of the more than 750 youth who exit the juvenile justice system, and the several thousand who exit the probation system annually."

In the second of two pilots launched by Massachusetts in 2012, Third Sector Capital Partners joined with the Massachusetts Housing and Shelter Alliance (MHSA), lead intermediary for a chronic homelessness project, as well as the Corporation for Supportive Housing and United Way. The Massachusetts Housing and Shelter Alliance represents nonprofit housing organizations that provide housing and support services, such as medical care and vocational training. The consortium' goal was to raise the number of housing units it provides to around 600 from 220.

== Michigan ==
Following its bankruptcy, Detroit was compelled to sign Asset Monetization arrangements with its creditors. In September 2014, the City came to terms with bond insurer Syncora on its $400 million claim; Syncora would receive a 20-year lease extension on their P3 operation of the Detroit-Windsor Tunnel and 30-year lease of the underground garage at Grand Circus Park.

On October 16, 2014, lawyers for the city of Detroit and Financial Guaranty Insurance Company (FGIC), a bond insurer with a $1 billion claim, disclosed in court that they had reached a deal to settle the company's claims. Under the deal, the city and state would pay for the demolition of the city-owned Joe Louis Arena once the Red Wings move into the new arena. After demolition, FGIC would receive the arena site and an adjacent parking lot, giving the company nearly 9 acres (3.6 ha) for redevelopment and $152 Million in city notes, partly paid through public parking revenues.

== New York ==
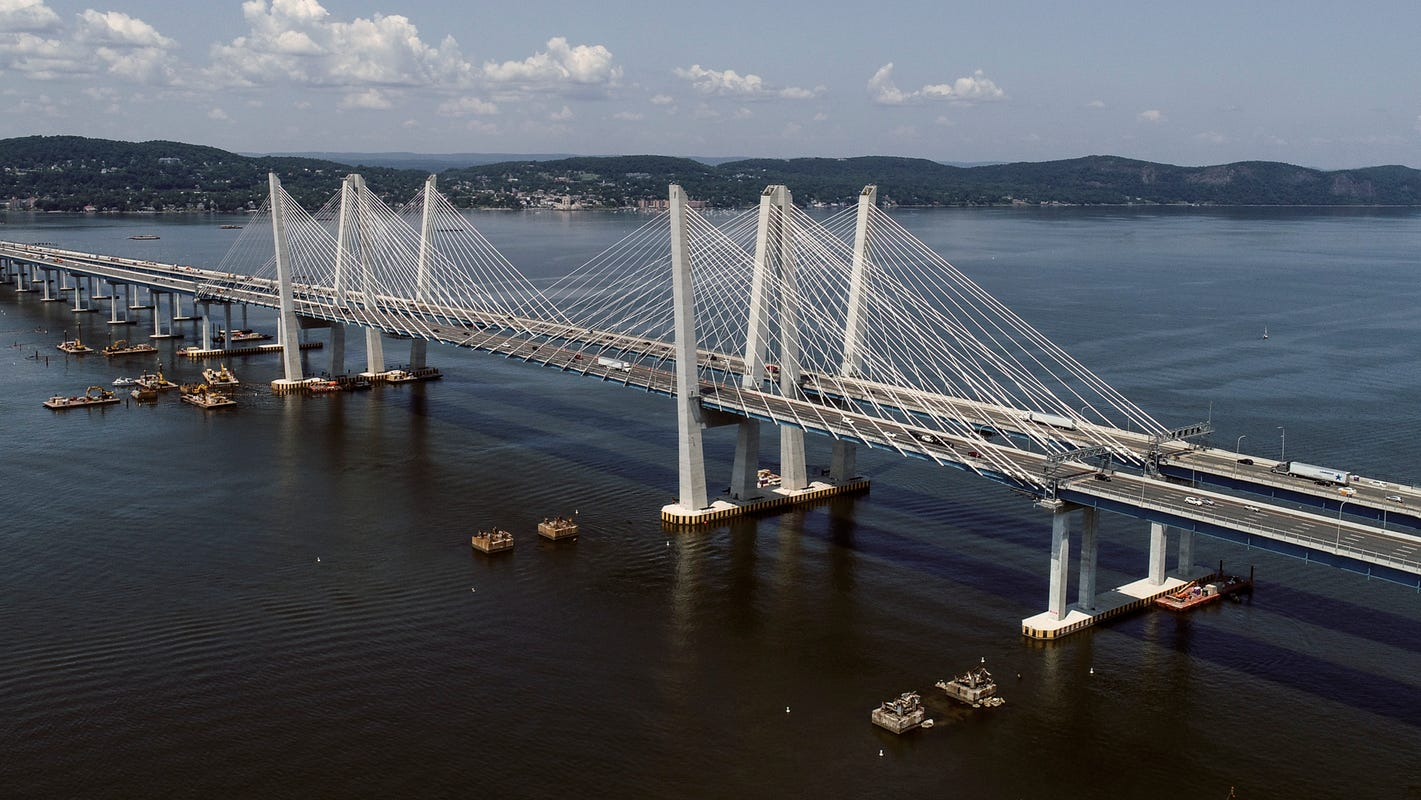
One year after the completion of the Tappan Zee Bridge, dozens of bolts holding its steel girders together had already failed. A whistleblower claims that the SPV responsible for its construction had knowingly delivered many defective high-strength bolts and taken measures to hide evidence of the defects.

In New York, during the Robert Moses era, public-private partnership was frequent PPPs during this period were best described and known as public authorities; for example, the Triborough Bridge and Tunnel Authority, Henry Hudson Parkway Authority, and the Port Authority of New York and New Jersey. Moses manipulated various public authorities, either seeking their success of failure, in order to gain political power More recently, the new Tappan Zee Bridge and the Javits Center are considered public-private partnerships.

In February 2012, the City of New York issued a $9.6 million social bond for prisoner rehabilitation to be run by The Osborne Association with support from Friends of Island Academy. Goldman Sachs bought the bond and will profit if recidivism decreases. While the City of New York didn't actually issue bonds or put up-front capital for MDRC to run the program (this was done by Goldman Sachs directly with MDRC), the City may be liable for some amount if the program is successful. An independent evaluation, performed by the Vera Institute of Justice, found the goal of reducing teenage recidivism by ten percent had not been met, at all, and the city paid nothing to Goldman Sachs.

In mid-2012, the New York State Department of Labor (DOL) selected Social Finance US as its Intermediary partner in structuring an application for federal funding for a Social Impact Bond. In 2013, New York approved $30 million in its budget to support Social impact bonds over the subsequent five years. In September 2013, New York State received a $12 million grant from the United States Department of Labor (USDOL) to fund a Pay for Success project designed to increase employment and reduce recidivism among 2,000 formerly incarcerated individuals in partnership with Social Finance US and the Center for Employment Opportunities. This was the largest grant awarded by USDOL for Pay for Success projects.

== Texas ==
In 2017, the State of Texas sought its first ever private partner to join in a project to renovate the G. J. Sutton Building in Downtown San Antonio near the Alamodome, according to Mike Novak, the chairman of the Texas Facilities Commission. Local governments in Texas have already entered into such partnerships including the redevelopment of the HemisFair Arena and the construction by Weston Urban of a new Frost Bank Tower in San Antonio. Named for G. J. Sutton, the first African-American elected official in San Antonio, the six-acre complex was vacated by the state in 2014 because of bat infestation and a deteriorating foundation. In 2015, Governor Greg Abbott, counter to the wishes of Mayor Ivy Taylor, used his line-item veto to remove $132 million which would have funded the rehabilitation of The Sutton. The state expects to see the property used at some point in the future for office space and parking slots.

== Utah ==
In August 2013, the Goldman Sachs Urban Investment Group (UIG) together with the United Way of Salt Lake and J.B. Pritzker formed a partnership to create the first ever Social Impact Bond designed to finance early childhood. Goldman Sachs and Pritzker jointly committed up to $7 million to finance The Utah High Quality Preschool Program, a high impact and targeted curriculum focused on increasing school readiness and academic performance among at-risk 3- and 4-year-olds in Utah.

== West Coast Infrastructure Exchange ==
The West Coast Infrastructure Exchange (WCX), a State/Provincial Government-level partnership between California, Oregon, Washington, and British Columbia that was launched in 2012, conducts business case evaluations for selected infrastructure projects and connects private investment with public infrastructure opportunities. The platform aims to replace traditional approaches to infrastructure financing and development with "performance-based infrastructure" marked by projects that are funded where possible by internal rates of return, as opposed to tax dollars, and evaluated according to life-cycle social, ecological and economic impacts, as opposed to capacity addition and capital cost.

== Global Development Alliances ==
Global Development Alliances is a program of the United States Agency for International Development (USAID). It was created in May 2001 as a new way for the U.S government to provide aid to developing countries through public-private partnerships. From 2001 to 2016, USAID formed 1500 of such partnerships with over 3 500 private sector organisations. The goal of these partnerships are to provide market-based solutions to problems faced by developing countries as identified by USAID.

== See also ==
- Private finance initiative
- Public-private partnerships by country
- Public-private partnerships in Canada
- Public-private partnerships in India
