= Clann Credo =

Clann Credo is a Social Investment Fund in Ireland founded by Sr Magdalen Fogarty and the Presentation Sisters in 1996. Its goal is to make capital available to community-focused enterprises to promote their growth. Whilst the model of Social Finance was a well-developed one in the United States, with a capacity of almost $1.8 billion by 2000, at the fund's inception in 1996 there were no such funds in Ireland. The fund is a not-for-profit organization with charitable status.

The Presentation Order funded a pilot project to test the alternative investment model the sisters had in mind. The Presentation Sisters advanced Greencaps £12,000, which was quickly paid back with interest. Greencaps Workers Cooperative creates jobs in Dublin Airport for young unemployed people from Ballymun, which is still trading as of 2009. The success of this pilot led to the formation of Clann Credo in 1996. As of 2008 over €17 million cumulative has been placed with projects, and the fund has invested in over 140 projects worldwide.

The President of Ireland, Mary McAleese said in an address to the group in 2006:

Clann Credo plays a truly invaluable role in giving practical effect to our moral responsibility for the social progress of the poor and the overlooked. You have meshed commercial acumen with the common good, created partnerships with established structures and given communities access to the funding and the confidence they needed to change their own futures for the better.

== Projects ==
Projects aided by the fund include:

- the Rathmore Social Action Group in County Kerry
- the Ballybane Community Centre in Ballybane, Galway City
- the Dunhill, Fennor, Boatstrand and Annestown (DFBA) Community Enterprises in County Waterford
- a rural housing project in Roscommon
- independent parenting services in Galway
- transport services for people with disabilities in north Dublin
- a horse riding centre for young people with special needs in Bray, County Wicklow

Clann Credo is the primary investor behind the Irish telecomms group GreenComm, which was developed to help raise funds for Irish charities including the Alzheimer's Society, Barnardos, the Chernobyl Children's Project, Irish Hospice Foundation, UNICEF Ireland, the ISPCC, Jack & Jill Children's Foundation and Temple Street Children's University Hospital.

The fund has targeted rural-based jobs in Ireland, including loans for job creation projects in areas of low employment. Bioshell near Belmullet is a rural-based organisation that has benefited from funding from Clann Credo since 1998 and as of 2006 employed 23 staff, manufacturing dietary supplements.

Clann Credo was also one of the financial contributors to Ballyhoura Food Centre (Hospital) Limited, a specialist food project in west Limerick which provides a 17,000 sq ft (1,600 m^{2}) factory with a custom-designed clean-room environment, acting as an incubator unit for new food companies. As of 2006 there were three food companies in the centre, employing 20 people.

The fund is a founding member of Roscommon Social Finance, a collaboration in County Roscommon with the Roscommon Integrated Development Company, local credit unions and the Roscommon County Development Board. This social finance group provides alternative finance options and accessible loans for voluntary and community groups in the county.

In July 2006, in response to proposals by Clann Credo, the Irish government set up the Social Finance Foundation with initial seed capital funding of €25m from the banking sector through its representative body, the Irish Banking Federation (IBF).

== See also ==
- Social enterprise lending
- Social finance
