= Social finance (disambiguation) =

Social finance is an approach in finance aiming to deliver a social dividend.

Social finance may also refer to:

- Social Finance (consultancy), an international nonprofit consultancy organization.
- SoFi, legally Social Finance, Inc., a San Francisco-based US financial services company.
