= Tracy Palandjian =

American nonprofit executive and impact investing leader

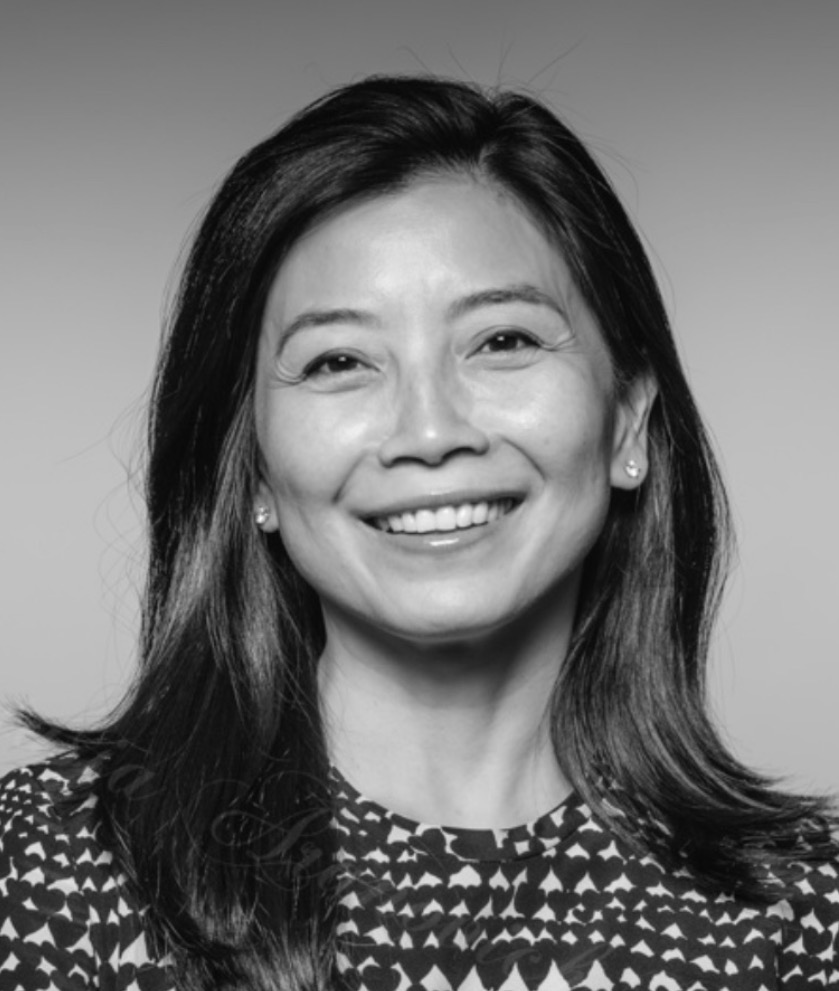
- Born: Hong Kong
- Education: Harvard College (BA); Harvard Business School (MBA)
- Occupations: Co-founder and CEO of Social Finance

Tracy Pun Palandjian is an American business person who is co-founder and chief executive officer of Social Finance, a national nonprofit organization and registered investment advisor.

Palandjian is a member of the Harvard Corporation, Harvard University’s governing board. She has served on the Barr Foundation Surdna Foundation, and The Boston Foundation. She is also co-founder and vice chair of the U.S. Impact Investing Alliance.

== Early life and education ==
Palandjian was born and raised in Hong Kong. She studied at the Diocesan Girls School in Hong Kong, before coming to the United States at age 14 to attend Milton Academy.

She graduated magna cum laude from Harvard College with a B.A. in Economics, and later earned an M.B.A. with high distinction from Harvard Business School, where she was a Baker Scholar.

== Career ==
=== Early career ===
Palandjian held early professional roles at McKinsey & Company and Wellington Management Company. She later joined the Parthenon Group where she became a managing director. She founded and led the Nonprofit Practice. Her work focused on advising foundations, NGOs, and other social sector institutions on strategy, social innovation, and organizational effectiveness.

=== Social Finance ===
In 2011, Palandjian co-founded Social Finance with Sir Ronald Cohen and David Blood. The organization is a nonprofit and registered investment adviser that develops financing approaches intended to expand economic opportunity. Palandjian has served as its chief executive officer since its founding.

Social Finance was initially known for helping develop the field of Social Impact Bonds and other pay for success models in the United States. These arrangements mobilize private capital to support social programs, with government repayment contingent on measurable improvements in outcomes. The organization subsequently expanded its work to include workforce development funds, outcomes based financing programs, and impact-first investment strategies.

In 2022, Social Finance launched the $100 million Google Career Certificates Fund in partnership with Google Alphabet. The program’s stated goal is to help more than 20,000 learners achieve $1 billion in aggregate wage gains during its first decade, by providing job-training and living expense support through no-interest outcomes-based financing. In 2026, Social Finance partnered with Anthropic and CodePath to launch Claude Corps, a national fellowship designed to expand the use of artificial intelligence in nonprofit and public-interest organizations.

In 2024, Social Finance established the Social Finance Institute, which conducts applied research and publishes work on outcomes-based finance and impact investing. Its publications include Workforce Realigned, a collaboration with four Federal Reserve Banks, which examines outcomes-based workforce strategies.

As of 2025, Social Finance reported having mobilized over $500 million in investments aimed at achieving measurable outcomes in workforce development, health, and housing, and working with partners in all 50 states.

== Views and opinions ==
Palandjian has written and spoken about outcomes-based financing, impact investing, and approaches that align capital with measurable social results. She argues that traditional program funding often pays for activities rather than results.She has emphasized that outcomes-based finance can help government and philanthropy become “more accountable, data-driven, and prevention-oriented”.

Palandjian has advocated for “impact-first investing,” an approach that prioritizes measurable social or environmental impact while seeking a financial return. She has presented it as a complement to both traditional grantmaking and market-rate investing, particularly for investment approaches that can generate returns but cannot attract commercial capital. She has argued that, because investment proceeds can be returned and redeployed, impact-first investing may allow philanthropic assets to support multiple cycles of social impact. Her public commentary has also focused on redesigning education and workforce systems in response to technological change, evolving labor-market needs, and concern about student debt. She has argued that effective workforce programs should combine training with financing and support for living expenses such as transportation, child care, and housing, particularly for people from lower-income backgrounds.

== Governance and boards ==
Palandjian was elected in 2022 to the Harvard Corporation. She previously was on the Harvard Board of Overseers (2012–2018) and on several Harvard visiting committees, including those for the Business School, the College, the Division of Continuing Education, and the Kennedy School.

In the philanthropic and non profit sector, Palandjian has served as a trustee of the Barr Foundation, the Surdna Foundation and The Boston Foundation. She is the co-founder and vice chair of the U.S. Impact Investing Alliance. Other nonprofit boards Palandjian has served include Mass General Brigham, and Facing History and Ourselves where Palandjian chaired the board from 2011 to 2014.

== Honors and recognition ==
- 2026: Forbes 50 over 50
- 2026: Ellis Island Medal of Honor
- 2026: Honorary Degree, Regis College
- 2022: Elected member, American Philosophical Society
- 2022: Elected member, American Academy of Arts and Sciences
- 2019: Alumni Achievement Award, Harvard Business School
- 2018: Robert F. Kennedy Embracing the Legacy Award
- 1993: John B. Imrie Memorial Award.

== Personal life ==
Palandjian is married to Leon A. Palandjian, M.D., whom she met at Harvard during their undergraduate studies. They live in Belmont, Massachusetts, and have three daughters.
