= WCX =

WCX may refer to:

- West Coast Infrastructure Exchange, a partnership between the three states on the west coast of the United States and British Columbia
- Station code for Wembley Stadium railway station in London
- Former callsign of WJR, a radio station broadcasting from Detroit in the United States
