= Judith M. Gueron =

Judith M. Gueron is an expert in research on unemployment, social disadvantage and family welfare. She is an Independent Scholar in Residence and President Emerita at MDRC, a nonprofit research organization that designs, manages, and studies projects to increase the self-sufficiency of economically disadvantaged groups.

== Career ==
Until 1974, she was director of special projects and studies and a consultant for the New York City Human Resources Administration.

She joined MDRC as research director at its founding in 1974 and served as its president from 1986 to 2004. In 2004–2005 she was a visiting scholar of the Russell Sage Foundation, an organization devoted to research in the social sciences. She also serves on the boards of directors of Alcoa, the National Bureau of Economic Research, and the Society for Research on Educational Effectiveness. She is a past president of the Association for Public Policy Analysis and Management.

In 1988, Gueron was awarded the American Evaluation Association’s Myrdal Prize for Evaluation Practice. In 2005, she received the first Richard E. Neustadt Award from the John F. Kennedy School of Government at Harvard University, "bestowed annually to an individual who has created powerful solutions to public problems, drawing on research and intellectual ideas as appropriate." In 2008 she received the Peter H. Rossi Award from APPAM, which "[recognizes] important contributions to the theory or practice of program evaluation."

== Education ==
Gueron received her BA from Radcliffe College in 1963 (graduating summa cum laude) and her Ph.D. in economics from Harvard University in 1971.

== Bibliography ==
- Gueron, Judith M.; Pauly, Edward; Lougy, Cameran M. (1991), From Welfare to Work, Russell Sage Foundation, ISBN 978-0-87154-346-2
- Mosteller, Frederick; Boruch, Robert F. (2002), "Chapter 2: The politics of random assignment (Judith Gueron)", Evidence matters: randomized trials in education research, Brookings Institution Press, ISBN 978-0-8157-0205-4
- Gueron, Judith M.; Rolston, Howard (2013), Fighting for Reliable Evidence, Russell Sage Foundation, ISBN 978-0-87154-493-3
