= President and Fellows of Harvard College =

Governing board of Harvard University

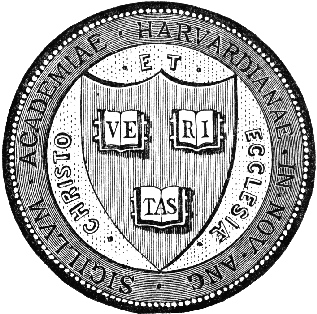
- Established: 1650 (376 years ago)
- Founder: Henry Dunster
- Legal status: 501(c)(3) Nonprofit corporation
- Headquarters: Massachusetts, United States
- Website: www.harvard.edu/about/leadership-and-governance/harvard-corporation/
- Remarks: The Corporation, along with the non-fiduciary Board of Overseers, govern Harvard University.

The President and Fellows of Harvard College, also called the Harvard Corporation or just the Corporation, is the smaller and more powerful of Harvard University's two governing boards. It refers to itself as the oldest corporation in the Western Hemisphere. At full capacity, as of 2024, the corporation consists of twelve fellows as well as the president of Harvard University, for a total of thirteen members.

The Corporation and the Board of Overseers exercise institutional roles that, at most other colleges and universities, are more commonly consolidated into a single board of trustees.

Although the institution it governs has grown into a university of which Harvard College is one component, the corporation's name remains "The President and Fellows of Harvard College".

== Structure ==
The Harvard Corporation is a 501(c)(3) and the owner of all of Harvard University's assets and real property.

As a governing board, the Corporation traditionally functioned as an outside body whose members were not involved in the institution's daily life, meeting instead periodically to consult with the day-to-day head, the president of Harvard University, whom it appoints, and who also serves as a member. The Corporation is self-perpetuating, appointing new members to fill its own vacancies as they arise.

For most of its history, the Corporation consisted of six fellows in addition to the president. But after the presidency of Lawrence Summers from 2001 to 2006, and a large endowment decline after the Great Recession in 2008–2009, a year-long governance review was conducted. In December 2010, it announced that the Corporation's "composition, structure, and practices" would be altered: the number of fellows would increase from six to twelve, with prescribed terms of service, and several new committees would endeavor to improve the group's integration with the activities of the University as a whole, especially its long-term planning.

== History ==
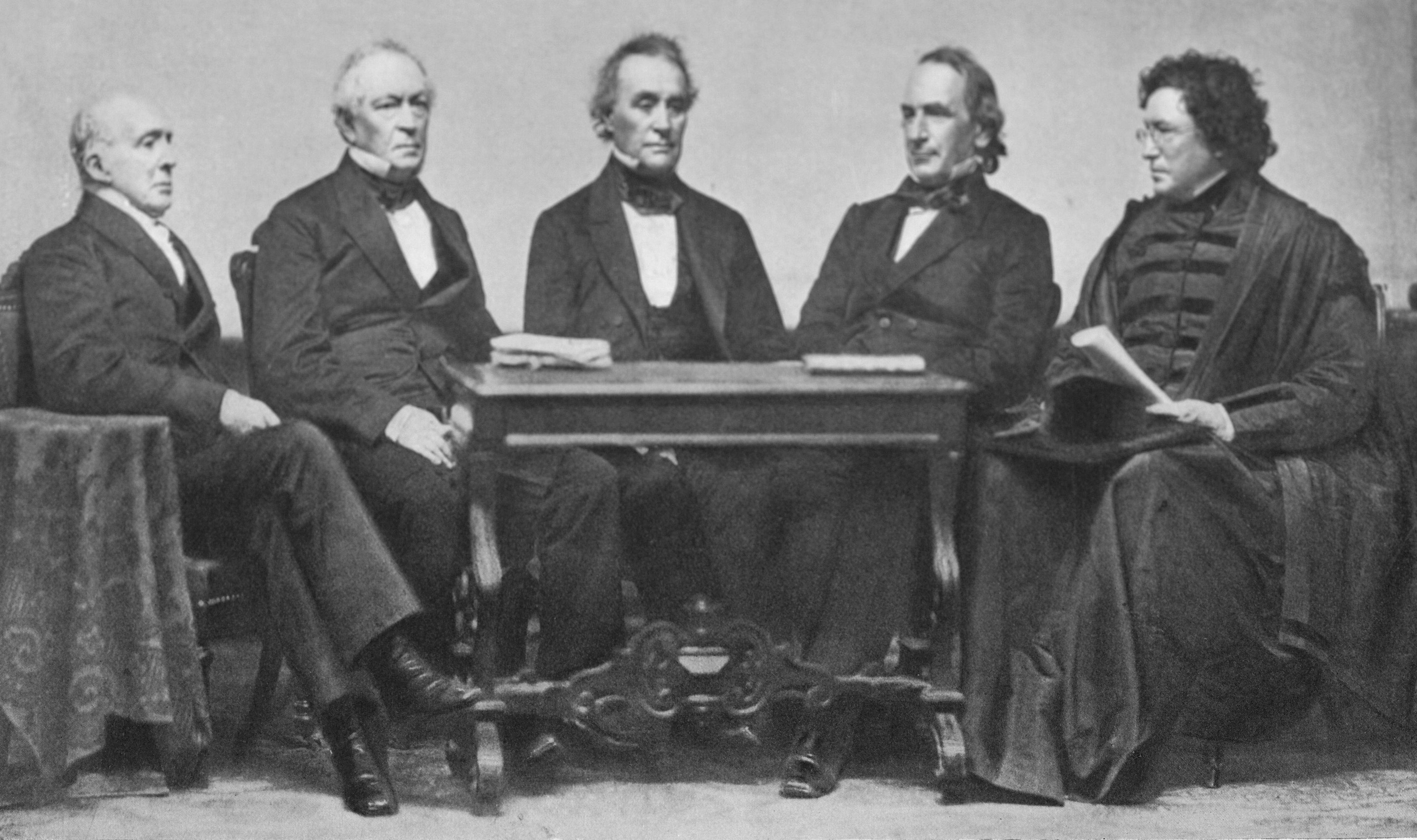
Harvard presidents Josiah Quincy, Edward Everett, Jared Sparks, James Walker, and Cornelius Conway Felton each served as members of the Harvard Corporation at various times.

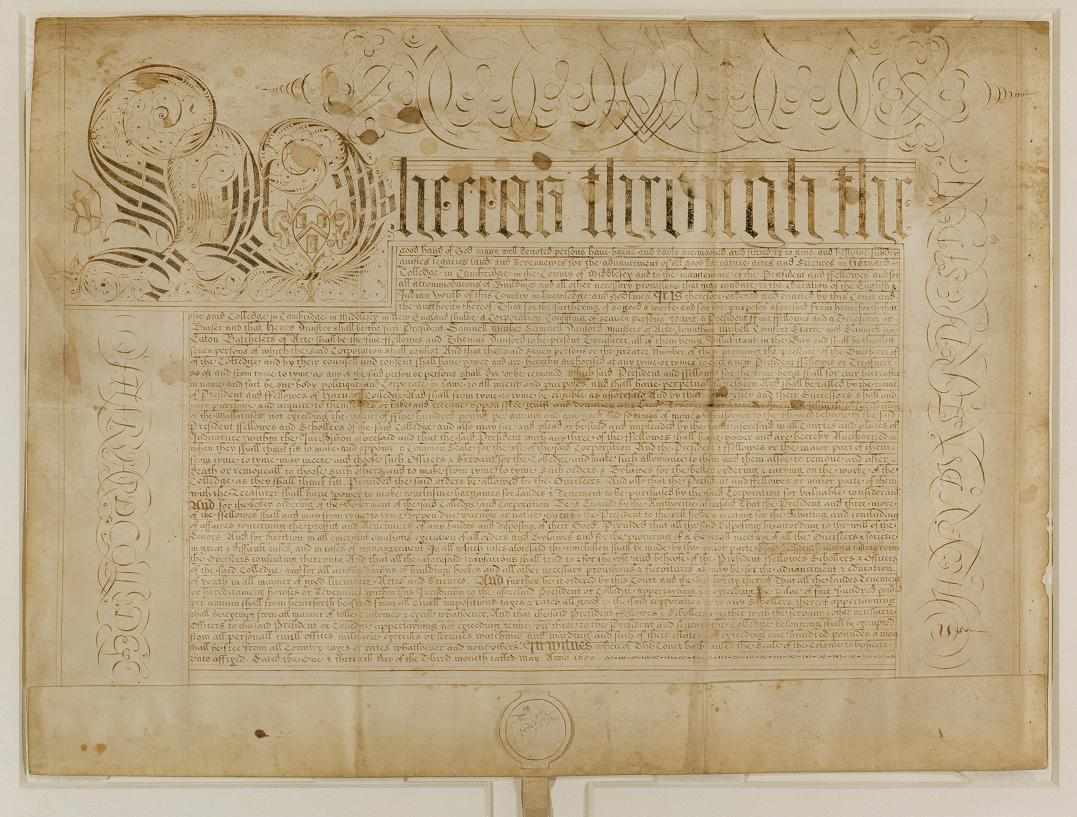
The Harvard Corporation Charter dated May 31, 1650 of the Julian calendar, not the Gregorian calendar.

=== 17th century ===
Starting in 1636, the affairs and funds of Harvard College were managed by a committee of the Great and General Court of Massachusetts. In 1650, at the request of Harvard's first president Henry Dunster, the Great and General Court of Massachusetts issued the body a charter.

The Charter of 1650 established the Harvard Corporation board which consisted of seven members: a president, five Fellows, and a Treasurer. The Corporation had the authority to manage the college's finances, real estate, and donations, act as a legal entity in courts of law, select officers and servants, and create orders and bylaws for the college, with the approval of the board of overseers.

The founding members of the Harvard Corporation were Henry Dunster as president, Samuel Mather, Samuel Danforth, Jonathan Mitchell, Comfort Starr and Samuel Eaton as the five Fellows and Thomas Danforth as the Treasurer. These men had, in perpetual succession, the duties of managing the college.

=== 18th century ===
The 1780 Constitution of the Commonwealth of Massachusetts reaffirmed that, despite the change in government due to the American Revolution, the corporation would continue to "have, hold, use, exercise and enjoy" its property and legal privileges. However it further noted that "nothing herein shall be construed to prevent the legislature of this commonwealth from making such alterations in the government of the said university."

=== 19th century ===
In 1805, the election of Henry Ware as Hollis Professor of Divinity placed the Corporation, then politically Federalist and religiously Unitarian, at odds with Massachusetts politics that was increasingly Democratic-Republican and still Trinitarian.

=== 21st century ===
In December 2023, the Corporation came under scrutiny by the United States House of Representatives, after a House Committee hearing on antisemitism. The following month, in January 2024, the House Ways and Means Committee, which has jurisdiction over university tax status and endowments, probed the tax status of Harvard and three other universities, over allegations of inadequate responses to antisemitism.

On May 22, 2024, one day before the annual Harvard commencement ceremony, the corporation refused to give diplomas to thirteen seniors of Harvard College involved in pro-Palestinian protests, overruling a vote of the Faculty of Arts and Sciences that included the students on the list of graduating students. Critics called it an attempt "to kill faculty governance" from a body that is usually "publicity-shy". Two months later, in July 2024, 11 of the 13 graduating seniors were awarded their diplomas.

In 2026, its deliberations were described by The Harvard Crimson as being "as opaque as ever."

== Current membership ==
As of March 2026, there are twelve members of the corporation, including the university president, who sets the agenda but does not vote.

| Name | Harvard Degree(s) | Year appointed | Occupation |
|---|---|---|---|
| Alan Garber | AB 1976, AM 1977, PhD 1988 | 2024 | President of Harvard University |
| Joseph Bae | AB 1994 | 2024 | Co-CEO of KKR & Co. Inc. |
| Timothy R. Barakett, Treasurer | AB 1987, MBA 1993 | 2019 | Former CEO of Atticus Capital |
| Kenneth Chenault | JD 1976 | 2014 | Former CEO of American Express, chairman and managing director of General Catalyst |
| Mariano-Florentino Cuéllar | AB 1993 | 2019 | Chief Global Affairs Officer for Anthropic, former president of the Carnegie Endowment for International Peace, Justice of the Supreme Court of California, and Stanford Law Professor |
| Kenneth C. Frazier | JD 1978 | 2024 | Former CEO of Merck & Co. |
| Richard P. Lifton | None | 2025 | President of Rockefeller University |
| Karen Mills | AB 1975, MBA 1977 | 2014 | Former Administrator of the U.S. Small Business Administration |
| Diana L. Nelson | AB 1985 | 2018 | Chair of Carlson Holdings |
| Penny Pritzker, Senior Fellow | AB 1981 | 2018 | Former United States Secretary of Commerce |
| Tracy Palandjian | AB 1993, MBA 1997 | 2022 | Co-founder and CEO of Social Finance |
| Kannon Shanmugam | AB 1993, JD 1998 | 2025 | Partner at Davis Polk |

== List of Senior Fellows ==
The Corporation's senior fellow is the lead trustee within the board. Before 2010, the role referred to the "longest-standing member of the Corporation". Changes in that year made the role into the “lead trustee.”

| Name | Term |
|---|---|
| Penny Pritzker | 2022–present |
| William F. Lee | 2014–2022 |
| Robert Reischauer | 2010–2014 |
