= California Energy Commission =

Government agency

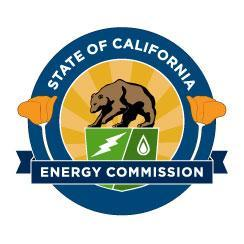

Agency overview
- Formed: 1974
- Jurisdiction: California
- Headquarters: 715 P Street, Sacramento, California 95814
- Employees: 700
- Annual budget: $1.32 billion (2021)
- Agency executives: David Hochschild, Chair; Siva Gunda, Vice Chair; J. Andrew McAllister, Commissioner; Nancy Skinner, Commissioner; Noemi Gallardo, Commissioner
- Parent agency: California Natural Resources Agency
- Website: www.energy.ca.gov

The California Energy Commission, formally the Energy Resources Conservation and Development Commission, is the primary energy policy and planning agency for California.

Created in 1974 and headquartered in Sacramento, the commission's core responsibilities include advancing state energy policy, achieving energy efficiency, investing in energy innovation, developing renewable energy, transforming transportation, overseeing energy infrastructure, and preparing for energy emergencies.

The commission is a division of the California Natural Resources Agency, which is under the direction of Cabinet Secretary Wade Crowfoot. One of its prominent responsibilities is maintenance of the California Energy Code.

== History ==
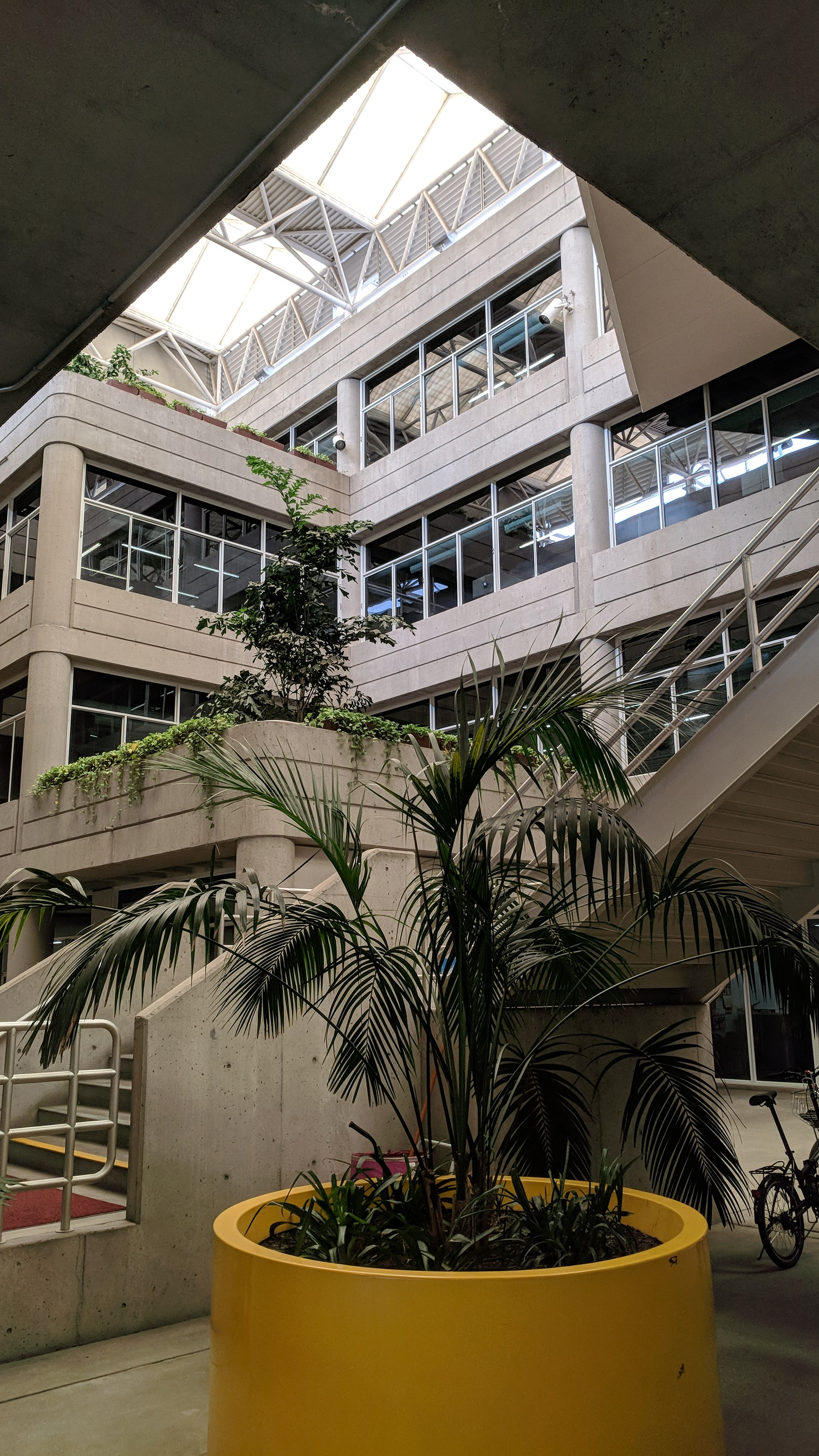
The interior of the California Energy Commission's facility, the Warren–Alquist Energy Building in Sacramento

Charles Warren and Al Alquist, California politicians, co-authored the 1974 Warren–Alquist State Energy Resources Conservation and Development Act that created the commission. The act required that, prior to constructing or modifying an electric generating plant, the commission was to certify the need for the plant and the suitability of the site of the plant.

In 1976, the California legislature amended the Warren–Alquist Act to require the commission, prior to any new nuclear generating plants being built, to certify that there is sufficient capacity to store spent fuel rods, and to establish a moratorium on the certification of any new nuclear generating plants until the federal government has approved and established a means for the disposal of high level nuclear waste. A legal challenge to this amendment by two electric utilities resulted in the United States Supreme Court case Pacific Gas & Electric Co. v. State Energy Resources Conservation and Development Commission, which upheld the amended act.

Arthur H Rosenfeld was a member of the U.S. Department of Energy Secretary Steven Chu's Energy Advisory Board and a commissioner of the Energy Commission from 2000 to 2010.

On January 17, 2001, a state of emergency declared during the California electricity crisis allowed the state to buy electricity for the financially strapped utility companies. The emergency authority allowed Davis to order the California Energy Commission to streamline the application process for new power plants. Alongside this, the California Energy Commission introduced an emergency load management program that supplied upwards of 1,000 businesses with fast responding electricity control systems. This allowed these businesses to reduce cumulative electricity loads during the California electricity crisis within 15 minutes of receiving an emergency alert.

On August 21, 2006, Governor Arnold Schwarzenegger signed Senate Bill SB 1, which directed the California Public Utilities Commission and the CEC to implement the California Solar Initiative program consistent with specific requirements and budget limits set forth in the legislation.

In 2013, these efforts were tested in a near worst-case scenario of high temperatures, and reduced hydroelectric and nuclear power. Thanks to a combination of clean energy and conservation, the state suffered no shortages.

== Current activities ==
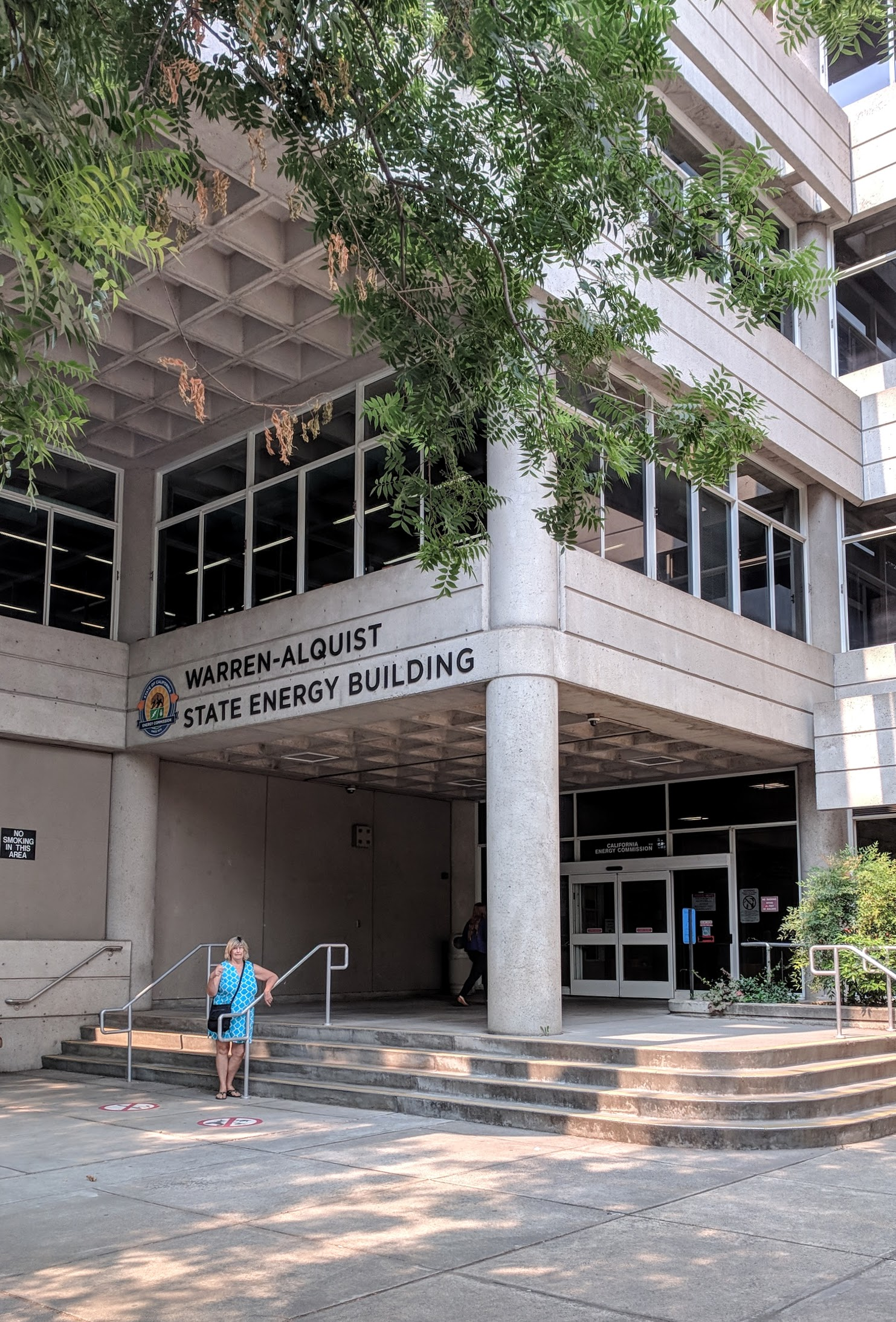
The front entrance of the California Energy Commission's Warren–Alquist Energy Building in Sacramento

In 2007, the commission set up relatively strict laws that forbid the signing of new energy supply contracts between utilities and coal-fired power plants. This was a major initiative to stem greenhouse gas emissions by 2020.

In 2013, the commission embarked on a program to expand Ethanol E85 retail distribution throughout the state of California. This project will install E85 dispensing equipment at 19 existing gasoline stations to take advantage of the existing fueling infrastructure. The $1.35 million contract was awarded to Pearson Fuels of San Diego. The commission expects the E85 vehicle fuel market in California eventually to be the largest in the United States, with approximately 55,000 new flex-fuel vehicles purchased in the state each year.

In 2015, California legislation passed a bill (SB 350) that sets a goal of having 33% of electricity produced from renewable resources by 2020, and 50% by 2030. The California Energy Commission was given the task of monitoring and enforcing regulation on utility companies, to help them meet this goal. Since the passing of the bill, The Energy Commission has been tracking the changes made by the state overall, and providing updates on the progress. As of June 2017, California has increased its consumption of renewable electricity generation to 29%, and the commission states that California is on track to meet the goal of 50% by 2030, if not exceed it. In a Fortune news article, Tony Early, the CEO of PG&E, predicts that the usage of renewable energy will be closer to 70% by 2030, and so the challenge these experts predict we will face is the storage of this immense amount of renewable energy. The co-founder of Opower Alex Laskey describes the need to design a new grid system, and the need for policies to determine the rules and regulation of the market for innovated grid, as well as the "need to make energy efficiency and power grid plans simple enough for consumers to understand them.” Since the nature of energy generated from renewable resources such as wind and solar power do not produce the amount needed to meet peak demand times, the NREL suggests several energy storage and regulation options that could increase the flexibility of renewable energy sources to meet the country's needs efficiently.

== Organization ==
- Cabinet secretary
  - Energy commission
    - Executive director
      - Administrative Services Division – responsible for providing centralized accounting, personnel, and information technology services for the entire commission
      - Electrical Assessments Division – responsible for providing analytical assessments of California's electricity and natural gas systems and trends
      - Energy efficiency and Renewables Division – provides assistance to businesses and individual on energy efficiency and conservation
      - Energy Facilities Siting Division – responsible for licensing new power plant construction and regulating existing power plants
      - Fuels and Transportation Division – responsible for analysing transportation fuels and energy needs
      - Research and Development Division – provides public funding to support energy research and technology development

== Projects ==
- Appliance efficiency program
- California Fuel Cell Partnership
- California Solar Initiative
- Energy Quest web site
- PHEV Research Center
- California Direct Air Capture (DAC) Hub

== See also ==
- California Air Resources Board
- California Public Utilities Commission
