= Toll roads in the United States =

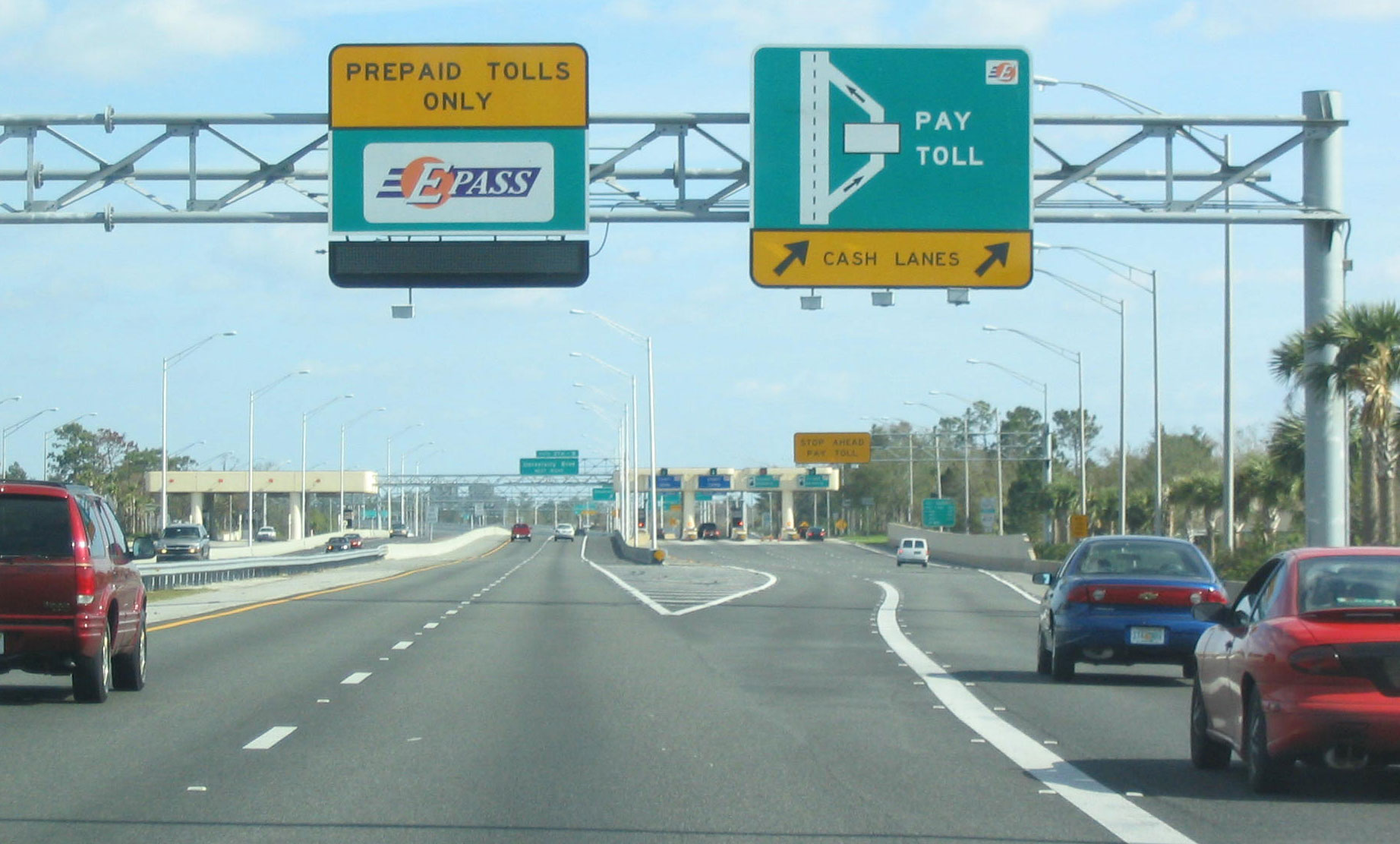
A high-speed toll booth on SR 417 near Orlando, Florida

Map of states that use E-ZPass or a compatible electronic tolling system State uses E-ZPass or has an electronic tolling system that is compatible with E-ZPass State has an electronic tolling system that isn't compatible with E-ZPass State collects tolls but doesn't use electronic tolling State or district doesn't have tolls

There are many toll roads in the United States; as of 2006, toll roads exist in 35 states, with the majority of states without any toll roads being in the West and South. In 2015, there were 5,000 miles (8,000 km) of toll roads in the country.

Most tolled facilities in the US today use an electronic toll collection system as an alternative to paying cash. Examples of this are the E-ZPass system used on most toll bridges, toll tunnels, and toll roads in the eastern U.S., as far south as Virginia, as far north as Maine, and as far west as Illinois; California's FasTrak; Florida's SunPass; Kansas's K-Tag; Oklahoma's Pikepass; Texas's TxTag (and within Texas, Houston's EZ Tag and Dallas's TollTag); Louisiana's GeauxPass; and Georgia's Peach Pass and Cruise Card. Many toll roads have implemented open road tolling which eliminates the need to stop at toll booths.

Toll roads, especially near the East Coast, are often called turnpikes; the term turnpike originated from pikes, which were long sticks that blocked passage until the fare was paid and the pike turned at a toll house (or toll booth in current terminology).

== Origins of funding through toll ==
In the mid to late nineteenth century, private toll road building was particularly active in the West including California and Nevada. In Nevada, over 100 private toll roads were laid out between the 1850s and 1880s, some of them nearly 200 miles (320 km) long. The owners included stage companies, miners, and ranchers who built the roads, at least in part, to attract business for their primary investments.

== Interstate Highway System ==
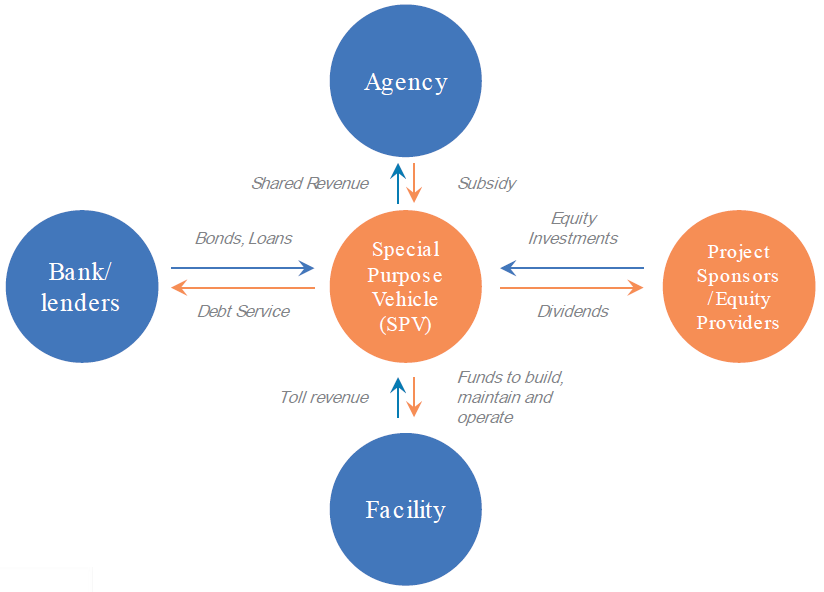
Typical Toll Concession P3 Structure as described by the Federal Highway Administration

By 1956, most limited-access highways in the eastern United States were toll roads. In that year, the federal Interstate Highway System was established, funding non-toll roads with 90% federal dollars and 10% state match, giving little incentive for states to expand their turnpike systems. Funding rules initially restricted collections of tolls on newly funded roadways, bridges, and tunnels. In some situations, expansion or rebuilding of a toll facility using Interstate Highway funding resulted in the removal of existing tolls. This occurred in Virginia on Interstate 64 at the Hampton Roads Bridge-Tunnel when a second parallel roadway to the regional 1958 bridge-tunnel was completed in 1976.

Since the completion of the initial portion of the Interstate Highway System, regulations were changed, and portions of toll facilities have been added to the system. Some states are again looking at toll financing for new roads and maintenance, to supplement limited federal funding. In some areas, new road projects have been completed and later maintained with public-private partnerships funded by tolls, also known as build-operate-transfer systems. One such public-private partnership was the constructions of the Pocahontas Parkway near Richmond, Virginia, which features a costly high level bridge over the shipping channel of the James River and connects Interstate 95 with Interstate 295 to the south of the city.

== See also ==
- Public-private partnerships in the United States
