= Pearson Fuels =

American fuel supplier

- Industry: Transportation Alternate Fuel Retailer
- Founded: 2002
- Headquarters: San Diego, California
- Products: Ethanol (E85)
- Website: http://www.pearsonfuels.com/

Pearson Fuels is a privately held alternative fuel retailer founded in San Diego in 2002. Pearson Fuels offers E85 (85% ethanol plus 15% gasoline) through a network of more than 450 retail stations in California.

== History ==
=== Grants ===
In 2010, the company received a $1.8 million state grant to assist in putting biodiesel into more tanker trucks.

In 2014, Pearson Fuels received a $1.35 million grant from the California Energy Commission. This funding was used to convert two diesel terminals into biodiesel blending terminals, allowing for the simultaneous loading of biodiesel and diesel. This change reduced the need for fuel trucks to visit multiple locations, and helped facilitate the use of alternative fuels.

== Products ==
Pearson previously offered multiple alternative fuels but now focuses exclusively on E85.

== See also ==
- Biofuel
- BioEthanol for Sustainable Transport
- E85
- Charging station
- Ethanol fuel
- Flexible-fuel vehicle
- BioFuels Security Act
- California Energy Commission
