= Global Development Alliances =

Global Development Alliances (GDA) is a program of the United States Agency for International Development (USAID). It was created in May 2001 as a new way for the U.S government to provide aid to developing countries through public-private partnerships. From 2001 to 2016, USAID formed 1500 of such partnerships with over 3 500 private sector organisations. The goal of these partnerships are to provide market-based solutions to problems faced by developing countries as identified by USAID.

== See also ==
- Economic Development
- Public-private partnerships in the United States
