= California Fuel Cell Partnership =

Public-private partnership to promote hydrogen vehicles

The California Fuel Cell Partnership (CaFCP) is a public-private partnership to promote hydrogen vehicles (including cars and buses) in California. It is notable as one of the first initiatives for that purpose undertaken in the United States. The challenge is which come first, hydrogen cars or filling stations.

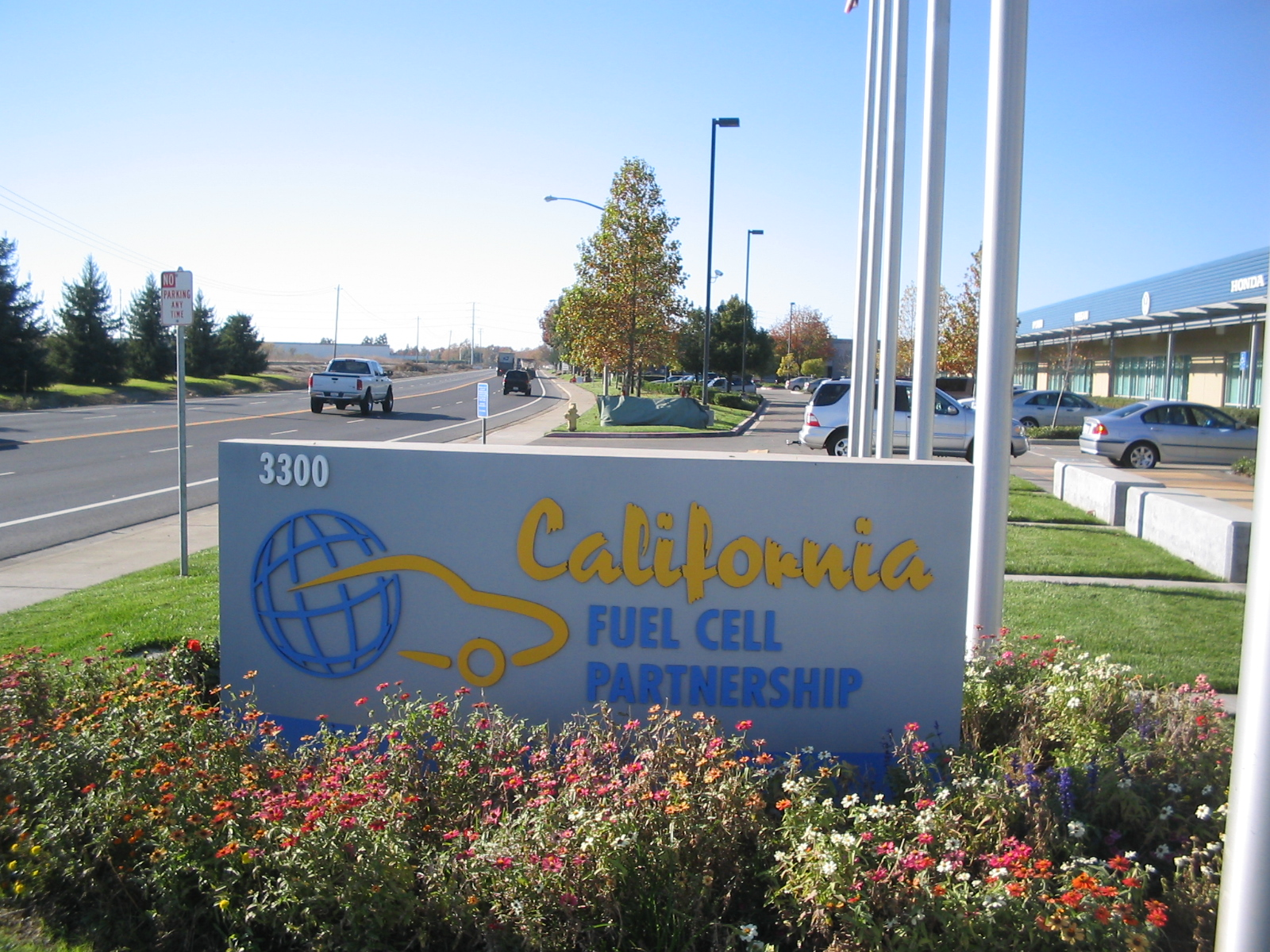
The California Fuel Cell Partnership, West Sacramento, California

In January 1995, three state government agencies—California Air Resources Board, South Coast Air Quality Management District and California Energy Commission joined with six private sector companies—Ballard Power Systems, DaimlerChrysler, Ford, BP, Shell Hydrogen and ChevronTexaco—to form the California Fuel Cell Partnership. The goal was to demonstrate and promote the potential for fuel cell vehicles (FCV) as a clean, safe, and practical alternative to vehicles powered by internal combustion engines.

In November 2000, the West Sacramento headquarters opened. The building includes a public gallery, offices, a hydrogen fueling station and indoor service bays for vehicle maintenance. At first, the automakers had just handful of cars all stationed in Sacramento. The goal was to see if these vehicles and fuel could be technically viable. If the answer was no, then CaFCP would close its doors in 2004.

Before the first phase was finished, CaFCP members knew that the technology could succeed. The number of members grew to 33 and set a new set of goals for the next phase of operation, from 2004-2007. During this period, CaFCP members worked on project to prove or disprove the commercially viability—would the vehicles, fuels and public policies meet consumer expectations?

In mid-2006, the members agreed that FCVs could be a commercial success. They agreed to a third phase through the end of 2012 to lay the foundations for a commercial market, which includes developing early retail stations, policies to enable the sale of retail hydrogen and necessary steps to building a supplier base for large-scale production in the future.

CaFCP completed its first phase of operation in December, 2003. The second phase will conclude in December, 2007. In mid-2006, the members agreed to enter a third phase to encourage fuel cell vehicle commercialization that will continue through 2012.

== Mission ==
CaFCP's mission is to promote the benefits of hydrogen fuel cells. Hydrogen fuel cells is a zero emission technology - a technology that would eliminate air toxics, criteria pollutants that create urban smog, and global gas pollutants such as carbon dioxide. Hydrogen can be created from multiple sources - from a range of fossil fuels and from cleaner 'electrolytic process'. In the initial demonstration stage, hydrogen will be made from natural gas, a fossil fuel. That's because over 95% of industrial hydrogen is currently made very efficiently from natural gas (Industrial hydrogen production makes up only a small fraction (6 percent) of natural gas consumption. Natural gas is used extensively around the globe for primarily residential, commercial heating, and in making electricity).

Natural gas will be the cheapest option for producing hydrogen, but it emits carbon dioxide. However, the whole aim of hydrogen fuel sector is to move towards splitting sea-water by electrolysis into pure hydrogen (and oxygen). Electrolysis ("the electrolytic process") uses electricity from renewable clean resources, such as solar, and wind. Such electrolysis eliminates any pollutants to the atmosphere. In mid 90s, the South Coast Air Quality Management (SCAQMD) initiated and funded several pilot hydrogen projects at Sunline Transit, in Riverside County, near Palm Springs, California. The SCAQMD team included several technology companies (such as Ballard, Air Products, Electrolyzer, Schwatz Energy Center) assembled together to demonstrate hydrogen in general transportation use, both in light duty vehicles and transit buses. The project used hydrogen initially from steam reforming, and later from solar panels based electrolysis of water. Hydrogen produced was stored on site, and dispensed as fuel. These projects were first of its kind in California, and proved to be highly successful. The projects clearly demonstrated the safety of hydrogen for general public use. The Hindenburg curse that caused experts to vilify hydrogen was lifted. Success of these pilot projects convinced CAFCP to identify hydrogen as the "fuel for the future". As of early 2021, Japan, South Korea, Germany and Saudi Arabia have announced massive programs into producing hydrogen via solar/wind/renewable resources, and deploying it in fuel cell vehicles. Other Western European countries are following suit. China reportedly is gearing up to spend billions as well in advancing hydrogen fuel cells.

Hydrogen has been criticized by some as a fossil fuel based fuel. This is only true in initial stages. The hydrogen currently dispensed in hydrogen vehicles in California is already exceeding the 30 percent mandate of renewable hydrogen to fossil fuel mix. The aim is to achieve 100 percent in the not too distant future. Manufacturers, such as Toyota, Honda and Hyundai, are offering generous incentives to buyers of their hydrogen cars to offset the cost of the fuel.

In summary, hydrogen fuel cell technology (at around 60 percent efficiency) is twice more efficient than the regular gasoline cars. Current gasoline car wastes 70 percent in heat, using only 30 percent of the valuable energy to drive the vehicle. SUVs are the current craze among consumers. But SUVs waste even more valuable energy - in excess of 75 percent. In addition, whereas hydrogen fuel cells emit only water vapor, gasoline/ diesel vehicles emit a range of air toxics, urban smog pollutants and global warming emissions. In view of this, California has announced a target of zero sales of new gasoline combustion automobiles by year 2035, with all of its sales coming from zero emission battery and hydrogen fuel cell cars.

== Membership ==
The California Fuel Cell Partnership is a unique collaborative of auto manufacturers, fossil fuel companies, fuel cell technology companies and government agencies. The members collaborate on activities that advance the technology, such as first responder training, community outreach and agreeing on protocols while standards are being developed.

Automotive members provide fuel cell passenger vehicles that are placed in demonstration programs, where they are tested in real-world driving conditions.

Fossil Fuel members work to build hydrogen stations within an infrastructure that is safe, convenient and fits into the community.

Fuel cell technology members provide fuel cells for passenger vehicles and transit buses.

Government members lay the groundwork for demonstration programs by facilitating steps to creating a hydrogen fueling infrastructure.

=== Full members ===
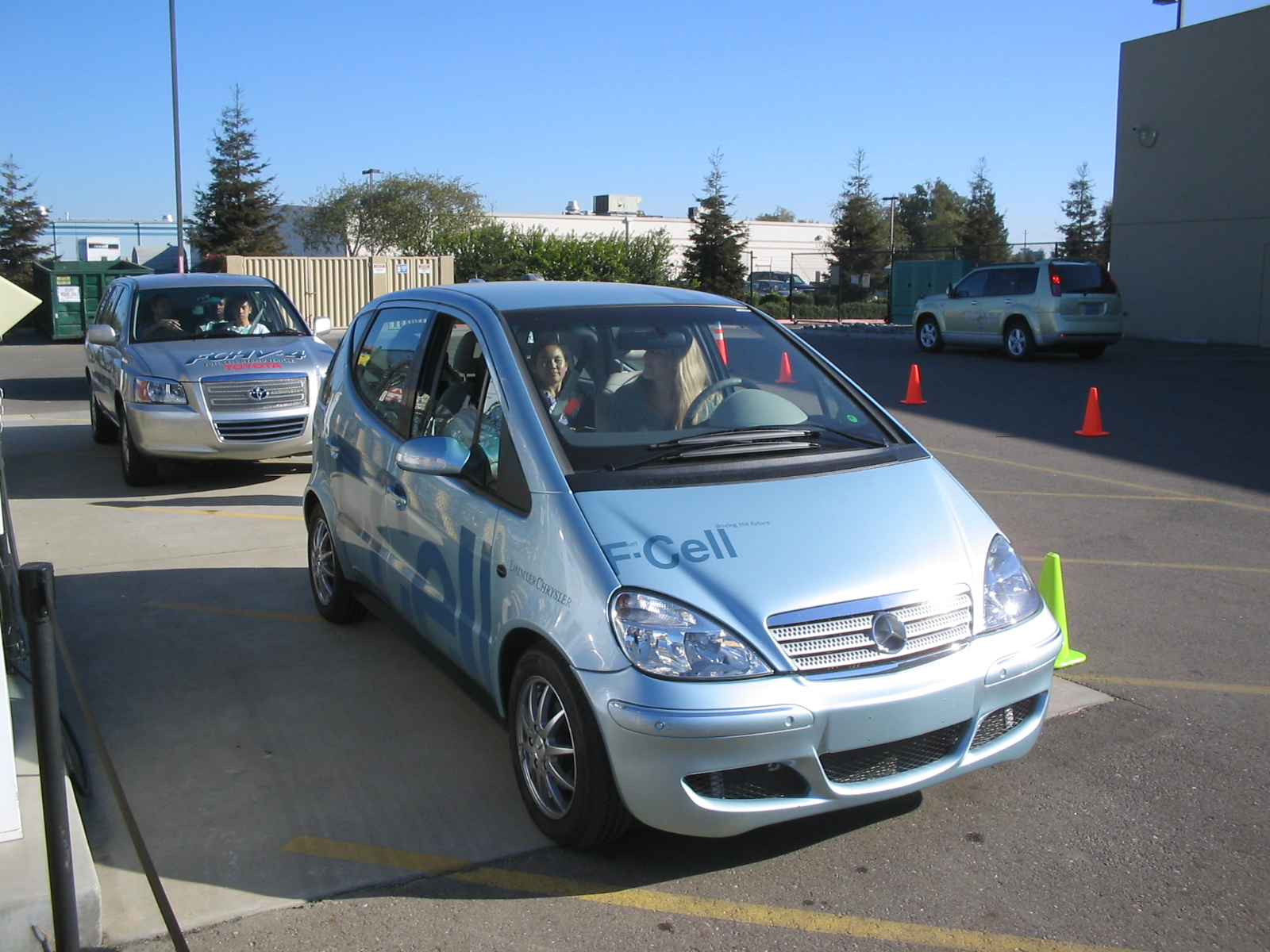
On occasion, free tours are offered to the public where they take a guided tour of the facility and ride in the hydrogen-powered vehicles

Automobile makers

- Chrysler
- Daimler
- General Motors
- Honda
- Hyundai
- Nissan
- Toyota
- Volkswagen

Hydrogen Fuel Cells

- Automotive Fuel Cell Cooperation
- Cummins

Fossil Fuel Companies

- Chevron
- Shell Hydrogen

Government Agencies

- California Air Resources Board
- California Energy Commission
- United States Department of Energy
- United States Department of Transportation
- United States Environmental Protection Agency
- South Coast Air Quality Management District

=== Associate Members ===
Associate members assist the full members meet the partnership's objectives by helping in specific areas of expertise.

Transit Agencies

- Alameda-Contra Costa Transit District
- SunLine Transit
- Santa Clara Valley Transportation Authority (Santa Clara VTA).

Fueling Providers

- Air Products and Chemicals
- Powertech Labs, Inc.
- Praxair
- Proton Energy Systems, Inc.,

Construction

- TLM Petro Labor Force, Inc.

Others

- California Department of Food and Agriculture
- Institute of Transportation Studies, UC Davis
- National Fuel Cell Research Center, UC Irvine

== See also ==
- California Hydrogen Highway
- Public-private partnerships in the United States
