= William F. Lee =

- Born: 1950 (age 75–76)
- Education: Harvard University (BA); Cornell University (MBA, JD)
- Occupation: Lawyer
- Known for: Iran-Contra investigation, Harvard Board
- Spouse: Leslie Lee
- Children: 3

William F. Lee (born 1950) is an American intellectual property and commercial litigation trial attorney. As co-managing partner of WilmerHale, Lee was the first Asian-American to lead a major American law firm. He was the Senior Fellow of the Harvard Corporation, the governing board of Harvard University, from 2014-2022.

== Personal life ==
Lee was born in Philadelphia in 1950 to Chinese immigrant parents who arrived in the United States in 1948. He received a Bachelor of Arts, magna cum laude, from Harvard College in 1972, a M.B.A. with distinction from Cornell Business School in 1976, and a J.D., magna cum laude and Order of the Coif, from Cornell Law School in 1976.

Lee is married to Leslie Lee. He has three children and five grandchildren.

== Career ==
=== Law firms ===
Lee joined the Boston-based law firm of Hale & Dorr in 1976. He chaired the firm's Litigation Department for four years and served as managing partner from 2000 to 2004.

In 2004, Hale & Dorr merged with the Washington, D.C.–based law firm of Wilmer, Cutler & Pickering to form Wilmer Cutler Pickering Hale & Dorr. Lee served as co-managing partner of the merged law firm, which is now known as WilmerHale, from 2004 to 2011. Since the merger, WilmerHale has grown to thirteen offices in five countries with nearly 1,000 lawyers and $1 billion in revenues annually.

Lee's practice focuses primarily on intellectual property and commercial litigation. Lee has tried more than 100 cases to judgment and has argued more than 50 appeals before the U.S. Court of Appeals for the Federal Circuit and other Courts of Appeals. He has served as lead trial counsel in several notable cases, including representing Apple in the "smart phone war" patent litigation. In August 2012, a jury awarded Apple more than $1 billion for infringement by Samsung.

=== Government service ===
From July 1987 to June 1989, Lee served as associate counsel to Independent Counsel Lawrence E. Walsh in the Iran-Contra investigation. In that capacity, Lee was responsible for certain portions of the grand jury investigation and resulting indictments.

In the 1990s, Lee served as a special assistant to the Massachusetts Attorney General for the purpose of investigating alleged incidents of racial bias in the Commonwealth's courts. He was also appointed by the Governor of Massachusetts to serve on a special Judicial Nominating Committee for the selection of judges for the Massachusetts Supreme Judicial Court.

In May 2000, Lee was one of 15 attorneys to be named by the chief judge for the U.S. Court of Appeals for the Federal Circuit to the court's Advisory Committee. Lee has also served on the Advisory Committees of the United States District Courts for the Districts of Massachusetts and Delaware.

=== Academia ===
From 1995 to 2002, Lee served as the John A. Reilly Visiting Professor at Harvard Law School, where he taught intellectual property litigation. Starting in 2008, Lee helped to develop the Problem Solving Workshop, a problem-based course for first-year law students and the final installment of Harvard's curriculum reform at the law school. Lee is now the Eli Goldston Visiting Lecturer on Law at Harvard Law School where he has taught the Problem Solving Workshop each year since 2010.

In June 2002, Lee was elected to the Board of Overseers of Harvard University. In April 2010, Lee was elected as a fellow of the Harvard Corporation effective July 1, 2010. He succeeded James R. Houghton as a member of Harvard's ten-member primary governing board.

Lee is also a member of the Visiting Committee at Cornell Law School.

Lee stated that "he believed law-school admissions should be race-blind, though the current system is not" in Harvard's first Asian American alumni summit in October 2010. However, in October 2018, Lee testified on behalf of Harvard in Students for Fair Admissions v. President and Fellows of Harvard College.

== Recognition ==
Lee is a Fellow of the American College of Trial Lawyers.

Lee has been recognized by peers in every issue of The Best Lawyers in America since 1995. He was named one of "The 100 Most Influential Lawyers in America" by the National Law Journal in June 2000 and again in June 2006. In the 2000 selection, he was commended for a "long record of favorable jury verdicts," achieved while leading the firm to a dominant presence in technology nationally and internationally and in pro bono services locally. In the June 2006 selection, NLJ praised his leadership in the merger that formed WilmerHale and again for his significant involvement in notable trials, including a recent victory in an infringement case against Hewlett-Packard Co. on behalf of EMC Corp that was settled in 2005 for $325 million while on appeal.
