= MDRC =

- MDRC
- Formation: 1974
- Headquarters: New York, NY
- President: Virginia Knox
- Website: www.mdrc.org
- Formerly called: Manpower Demonstration Research Corporation

MDRC is a nonprofit, nonpartisan education and social policy research organization based in New York City; Washington, DC; and Oakland and Los Angeles, California. MDRC conducts rigorous studies of programs and policies that affect people with low incomes, actively disseminates the lessons to policymakers and practitioners, and works directly with programs and agencies to help improve their effectiveness. In 2024, MDRC celebrated the 50th anniversary of its founding.

MDRC is led by Virginia Knox, who has served as president since October 15, 2019. Employees of MDRC are represented by Social Policy Workers United (SPWU), which is affiliated with the American Federation of State, County & Municipal Employees (AFSCME).

== History ==
In 1974, the Ford Foundation and six government agencies together created the Manpower Demonstration Research Corporation to run an ambitious, five-year, $50-million demonstration project called Supported Work. Over the years, MDRC became known for combining rigorous impact and implementation research with on-the-ground operational expertise to deliver policy-relevant findings to decisionmakers. In the 1980s and early 1990s, MDRC conducted evaluations of state welfare-to-work programs that influenced policy reforms. In the 1990s and early 2000s, MDRC expanded into education policy research — developing demonstration and research projects in the early education, K-12, and postsecondary education spheres. In recent years, MDRC has expanded into new domains, including criminal justice, behavioral science, and data analytics. It formally retired its original name and adopted "MDRC" as its registered corporate identity in 2003.

MDRC works across the United States, in Canada, and in the United Kingdom. Their 2021 budget is $66 million, which they derive from government contracts, foundations, corporations and individuals.

In 2021, MDRC voluntarily recognized Social Policy Workers United (SPWU) as their staff union. In June 2024, SPWU members went on an Unfair Labor Practice strike in response to MDRC's refusal to bargain over end-of-year raises. In August 2024, SPWU members voted to ratify their first contract.

== Focus areas ==
MDRC focuses on five policy areas and has two centers:

- Family well-being and children's development
- K-12 education
- Postsecondary education
- Youth development, criminal justice, and employment
- Economic mobility, housing, and communities
- Center for applied behavioral science
- Center for data insights

== Accomplishments ==
MDRC helped pioneer the use of random assignment to test social programs. Its evaluations of welfare work programs influenced the welfare reform of the 1990s. In the 1990s and 2000s, MDRC's evaluation of the Career Academies high school reform model, which showed impacts on participants' earnings eight years after graduation, influenced the expansion of the model around the nation. MDRC was the intermediary for the first social impact bond demonstration in the United States, a project to reduce recidivism among 16- to 18-year-olds incarcerated at Rikers Island. MDRC's study of the City University of New York's Accelerated Study in Associate Programs (ASAP) has demonstrated that the program has doubled the three-year graduation rate of students who begin college requiring remedial education.

== Affiliated people ==
- Judith M. Gueron
- Cecilia Rouse
- Bridget Terry Long
