= Social enterprise lending =

Social enterprise lending is a form of social finance which refers to the practice of offering loans and other financing vehicles below current market rates to social enterprises and other organisations pursuing social goals. This is often referred to as "patient lending," or financing with "soft" terms. Patient lending recognises that projects with social outcomes often reach profitability later than commercial projects. Softening the terms of a loan means that a social lender may offer provisions such as longer loan terms, lower interest rates and repayment "holidays" where capital and interest repayments are not due until the project is profitable. Social lenders might also offer small grants as part of an investment package.

== History and development ==
Social lending and social investors increased in popularity and number in the 1990s, in part as a reaction to the trend within charities, social enterprises and other voluntary and community organisations towards increasing their percentage of earned income and away from depending on shrinking sources of grant income. As a non-profit organisation develops new income streams, there is typically a funding gap between necessary investment in capacity, staff or infrastructure and profitability. This trend coincided with an increased tendency, in both the US and the UK, of government to turn to the voluntary and community sector to offer public services and provide solutions to social problems. Finally, the proliferation of venture capital firms in the tech boom of the mid-nineties highlighted the successful practices of venture capitalists and other private investors, and those practices eventually spilled over to the non-profit world. This trend began in the US, most notably on the west coast, and eventually spread to the UK and Europe.

Social lending and venture philanthropy are the direct result of applying private sector funding models to the public or voluntary sector. This is demonstrated by the recent trend for social investors to offer performance-related loans (often referred to as 'quasi-equity') and share equity in social businesses with the appropriate legal structure; two practices which are directly borrowed from venture capital.

Advocates of social lending argue that earned income is the better way to ensure long term sustainability for the voluntary and community sector and the only way for social enterprises and social businesses to succeed. And loan finance is best suited to sustain organisations during and beyond the growth or start up period because a loan focuses financial discipline and prepares an organisation to receive commercial finance in the future. Additionally, social lenders argue that the interest they earn can be recycled to benefit other organisations and is therefore, more efficient for the social sector overall than a grant.

The sources of funds vary across the spectrum of social lenders but most often includes government monies or donations from private individuals and foundations or trusts. Lenders may restrict themselves to funding newly started organisations or may fund organisations throughout their life cycle; however the focus of investment is usually in building the capacity of the investee to achieve their stated social outcomes while becoming financially sustainable.

== In Britain ==
In the British context, the largest of these types of social investors are Triodos Bank, Charity Bank and Unity Trust Bank. All three invest in social enterprises and third sector organisations that are pursuing social goals; Triodos Bank also has an additional interest in financing projects with environmental benefits. These institutions offer full-service banking and aim to serve organisations that cannot access traditional lending from commercial banks, and a majority of their customers are likely to be first-time borrowers.

A fourth large lender, Futurebuilders England, made £145 million of government-backed loans and grants between 2004 and 2010 but is closed to new applications.

All of the funds are only intended to support services for beneficiaries in England and funding must complement, not compete with, any possible commercial lending. The primary offering is a traditional loan at 6% which may be accompanied by professional support and grant funding where appropriate. The loan repayment period is variable, dependent on application, but the maximum period is 25 years with interest and repayment holidays of up to two years.

Triodos Bank finances companies, institutions and projects that add cultural value and benefit people and the environment, with the support of depositors and investors who want to encourage corporate social responsibility and a sustainable society. It is a pioneer in ethical banking. Triodos Bank finances companies which it expects will add cultural value and benefit both people and the environment. The bank uses money deposited by close to 100,000 savers and lends it to hundreds of organisations, such as fair trade initiatives, organic farms and social enterprises.

Charity Bank provides loan finance and advice to enable charities, community associations, voluntary organisations, community businesses and social enterprises across the UK to grow. It often lends where banks or building societies either will not make a loan at all, or will only do so on unaffordable terms.

Unity Trust Bank aims to put social change, social benefit and community involvement at the heart of what it does. It uses some of its profits to re-invest in the business to help more organisations in the future. The remaining profits are returned to its shareholders – trades unions and the Co-operative Bank – which are both part of UK civil society.

Since 2012, Big Society Capital has acted as a social investment wholesaler, investing in intermediaries which in turn provide finance and support to charities and social sector organisations. Its funds come from dormant bank accounts and from four UK banks.

Other social lenders in Britain include Adventure Capital Fund, Venturesome (an initiative of the Charities Aid Foundation), London Rebuilding Society, the Social Enterprise Investment Fund (formally Local Investment Fund), Community Development Finance Association, Cooperative and Community Finance, Bridges Community Ventures and the Capital Fund.

== See also ==
- Social finance
- Ethical banking
- Social Return on Investment
- Socially-responsible investing
- Social fund
