= Robert F. Boruch =

American psychologist (born 1942)

Robert Francis Boruch (born 1942) is an American psychologist.

Boruch studied metallurgical engineering at Stevens Institute of Technology, graduating in 1964, and completed a doctorate in psychology alongside a minor in statistics in 1968 at Iowa State University. He was a fellow at Stanford University between 1986 and 1987. Dr. Boruch taught at Northwestern University until 1989, when he joined the University of Pennsylvania faculty. Dr. Boruch was later appointed University Trustee Professor of Education and Statistics within the University of Pennsylvania Graduate School of Education. Over the course of his career Dr. Boruch has been elected fellow of the American Academy of Arts and Sciences, the Academy for Experimental Criminology, the American Educational Research Association, and the American Statistical Association. Dr. Boruch is co-founder of the International Campbell Collaboration, and an award named in his honor is given each year to people who have contributed remarkably to evidence-based policy.
