= Social impact bond =

Bond repaying investment based on social outcomes

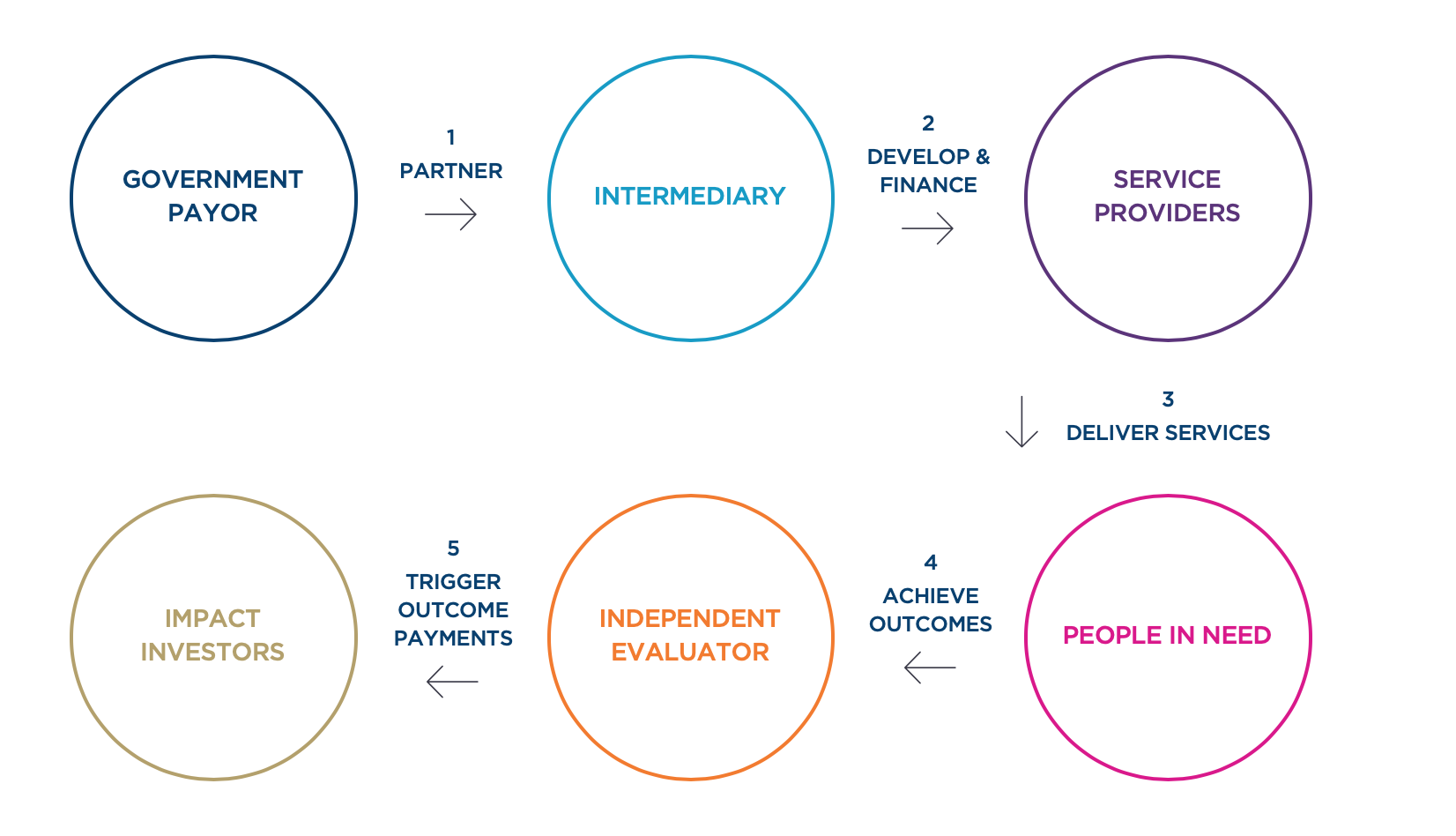
SIB functioning process diagram

A social impact bond (SIB), also known as pay-for-success financing, pay-for-success bond (US), social benefit bond (Australia), pay-for-benefit bond (Australia), social outcomes contract (UK), social impact partnership (Europe), social impact contract (Europe), or simply a social bond, is a type of outcomes-based contracting, whereby a contractor typically attempts to effect a policy of government but does not get paid by the government unless specified goals are achieved. Geoff Mulgan claims to have coined the term while he was chief executive of the Young Foundation. The first SIB was launched by UK-based Social Finance in September 2010.

By July 2019, 132 SIBs had been initiated in 25 countries, and they were worth more than $420m. As of May 2023, 23 countries use SIBs, with (as of 2022) 276 projects in place and capital raised to the value of $745m.

== History ==
The SIB is a non-tradeable version of social policy bonds, first conceived by Ronnie Horesh, a New Zealand economist, in 1988.

The first SIB was announced in the UK on 18 March 2010 by then Justice Secretary Jack Straw, to finance a prisoner rehabilitation program at Peterborough Prison. This grew out of research on alternative financing models by the Young Foundation, the Prime Minister's Council on Social Action (CoSA, a cross-sector advisory group) and Social Finance beginning in 2007 and published in 2009. The work was continued by the Centre for Social Impact in Australia, and other NGOs and private companies.

In Australia, the intention to trial SIBs was announced in New South Wales in November 2010 by Premier Kristina Keneally of the Australian Labor Party. The policy was continued by the Coalition after a change of Government in 2011.

Political support for SIBs in the US emerged in federal budget proposals in 2011, and from the cities of New York and Baltimore. The Rockefeller Foundation supported the US expansion of Social Finance, the SIB Technical Assistance Lab at Harvard Kennedy School and the October 2011 SIB convention hosted by the White House Office of Social Innovation and Civic Participation. In August, 2012, Massachusetts became the first US state to create a policy which encourages the creation of Social impact bonds, termed "Social innovation financing". The state legislature authorised spending as much as $50 million on the initiatives.

In November 2012, Essex County Council became the first local authority in the UK to commission a social impact bond in Children's Services, with the intent of providing therapeutic support and improving outcomes for adolescents at risk of going into care. In February 2013 Allia, a charitable social investment organisation, announced a bond fund intending to diversify into real estate lending and the Essex SIB, which would have been the first opportunity for retail investors to in a SIB. The product was later withdrawn from sale due to lack of investors.

In 2016 the Government Outcomes Lab was launched as a partnership between the UK government's Office for Civil Society and University of Oxford Blavatnik School of Government to study SIBs and outcomes-based contracting approaches more broadly. In July 2016, Social Finance initiated a white paper on the state of the SIB market, "Social Impact Bonds: The Early Years" and a live, sortable global database of SIBs.

In February 2018 the Social Impact Partnerships to Pay for Results Act (SIPPRA) was signed into law, allocating $100 from the US Treasury towards SIBs. The bill had been introduced with bipartisan co-sponsorship in January 2017. In 2021 the Treasury awarded grants to local and state agencies in three states. Six further awards were announced in December 2024.

== Definitions ==
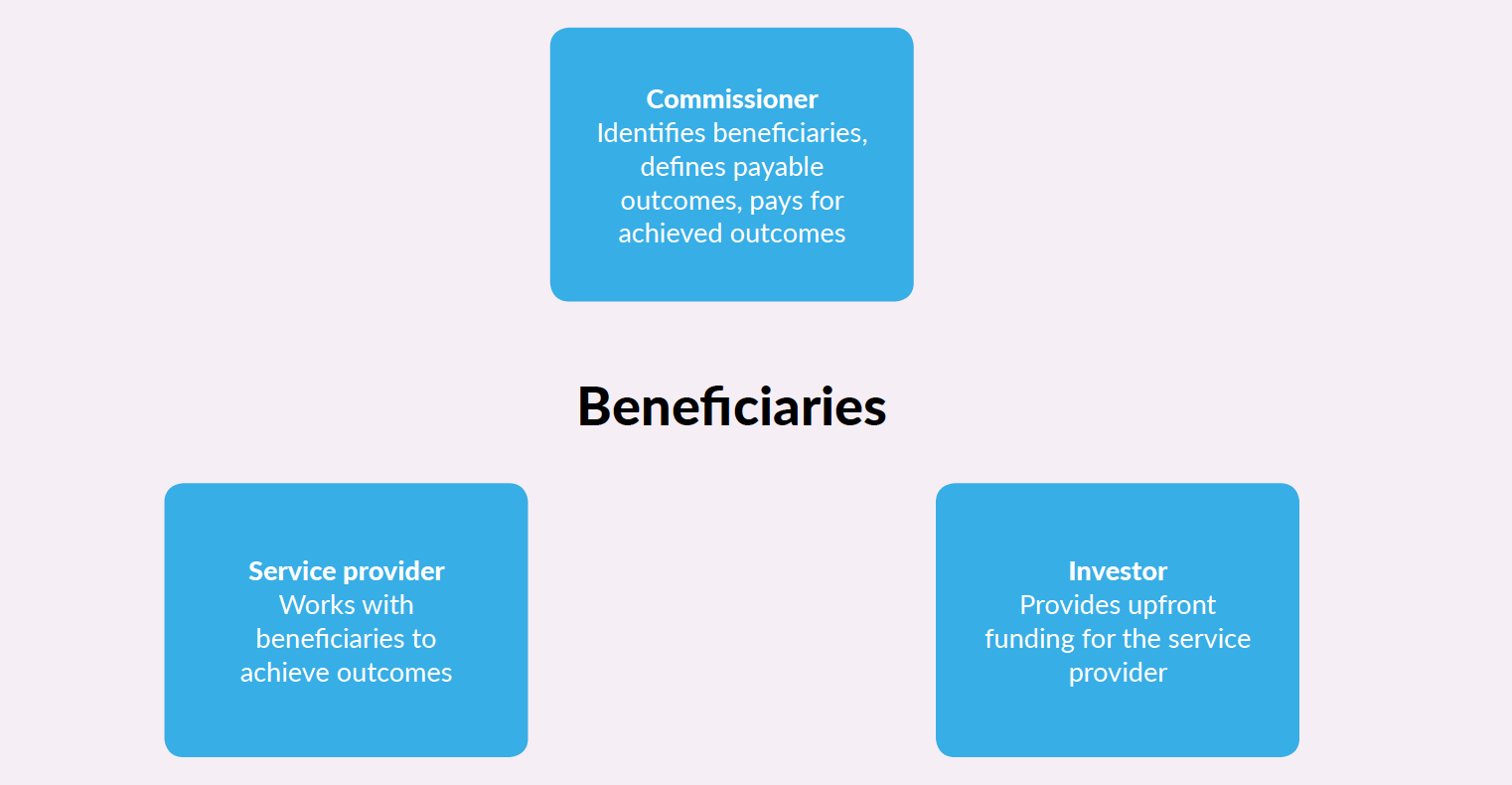
SIBs as partnerships: partners and responsibilities

There are a range of interpretations of what the term ‘social impact bond’ means. Generally, social impact bonds are a type of bond, but not the most common type. While they operate during a fixed period of time, they do not offer a fixed rate of return. Repayment to investors is contingent upon specified social outcomes being achieved. Therefore, in terms of investment risk, social impact bonds are more similar to that of a structured product or an equity investment. Third Sector Capital Partners describes social impact bonds as “a potential financing option available to support pay-for-success programs. Social impact bonds bring together government, service providers and investors/funders to implement existing and proven programs designed to accomplish clearly defined outcomes. Investors/funders provide the initial capital support and the government agrees to make payments to the program only when outcomes are achieved. So government pays for success.”

Social Finance UK describes social impact bonds as: “a social impact bond is a public-private partnership which funds effective social services through a performance-based contract.” Social Finance, therefore, specifies that the investment is from non-government bodies.

The Young Foundation describes social impact bonds as: “a range of financial assets that entail raising money from third parties and making repayments according to the social impacts achieved.” The Young Foundation envisages that public bodies could be potential investors.

The Non-Profit Finance Fund describes social impact bonds as: “PFS financing agreements, in which private investors provide upfront capital for the delivery of services and are repaid by a back-end, or outcomes payor (usually a government), if contractually agreed-upon outcomes are achieved, are often referred to as ‘Social Impact Bonds’ ... Social Impact Bonds (SIBs) are a mechanism by which to shift financial risk from service providers to investors, with investors underwriting service providers’ based on their ability to deliver on positive social outcomes.”

The Government Outcomes Lab identifies four main dimensions along which SIBs might vary: “the nature and outcome of payment outcomes”, “the nature of capital used to fund services”, “the strength of performance management”, and “the social intent of service providers”. According to the GO Lab, a 'core' SIB is therefore defined by “100% payment on outcomes”, “independent and at-risk capital”, “a high degree of performance management”, and “a strong social intent of service providers”.

In developing countries, a development impact bond (DIB) is a variation of the SIB model. DIBs are outcomes-based funding structures for the delivery of public services in low- and middle-income countries.

== Arguments in favour ==
Advocates of SIBs claim that they encourage innovation and tackle difficult social problems, asserting that new and innovative programs have potential for success, but often have trouble securing government funding because it can be difficult to prove their effectiveness rigorously. This type of financing allows the government to partner with private service providers and, if necessary, private foundations or other investors willing to cover the initial costs and assume performance risk to expand promising programs, while assuring that taxpayers will not pay for the programs unless they demonstrate success in achieving the desired outcomes. The expected public sector savings are used as a basis for raising investment for prevention and early intervention services that improve social outcomes. Advocates also believe that SIB programs can achieve positive social outcomes, may create fiscal savings for government, but also involve changes of funding arrangements that bring risks to service agencies.

The benefits of social impact bonds depends on the definition being used, but the broad benefits (though not measured and verified yet) are:

- Prevention — more funds are available for prevention and early intervention services.
- Risk transfer — the public sector only has to pay for effective services; the third party investor bears all the risk of services being potentially ineffective.
- Innovation — risk transfer enables innovation since investors and service providers have an incentive to be as effective as possible, because the larger effect they have on the outcome, the larger the repayment they will receive.
- Performance management — the SIB method includes continuous evaluation of program effects, increasing the rate of learning about which methods work and which do not. Governments will therefore fund "what works"; repositioning government spending to cost-effective preventive programs. Additionally, independent evaluation creates transparency for all parties.
- Collaboration — enable collaboration across multiple commissioners and within service provider networks and attract new capital to the social, educational and healthcare sectors.

== Criticism ==
Critics note that because the outcomes-based payments are dependent on governmental funds which must be budgeted, social impact bonds do not actually raise additional capital for social programs, but instead displace funding for other programs. Given the need to budget for a return on investment, a program evaluation, middle managers, and the expenses of designing the complex financial and contractual mechanisms, social impact bonds, according to critics, may be an expensive method of operating social programs. Other criticisms include:

- Criteria for success — Donors will seek to fund that which can be observed and measured, the outcomes (not just the outputs). This will leave agencies addressing problems in society unable to access these funds. This is going to be particularly true for advocacy, arts and alternative organizations. It will be difficult for social coalitions to get funding as their contributions are dispersed through member organizations and the effect they have on government policies, for example. The terms of these instruments may be set to overpay for more readily achievable goals. Doing so would increase long term government spending and divorce such spending from direct deliverables.
- More donor influence — Donors, or now investors, will want to make sure their money is being used according to contract, and will therefore want to be more involved in the delivery of social services. They may want NGOs to adopt a style of delivery used in for profit business.
- Unfair competition — Competition with NGOs will emerge. Agencies that secure funds will be able to operate in areas where NGOs now operate, but they will have greater resources, more narrowly defined goals (and therefore successes to publicize) and will set the standard for government funded agencies and their actions.
- Reduces public responsibility — By reducing the government's responsibilities and accountability for delivering services. Though governments may not genuinely represent their societies, they are still the best representatives of the public will and governments play an important role in maintaining a civil society sector. Devolving Social services to businesses risks this social contract when other tax and program options can be made available.
- Non-tradability — New Zealand economist Ronnie Horesh argues that because SIBs are not tradable, SIBs favour existing institutions, are inherently narrow and short-term in scope, and impose relatively great monitoring costs.
- Not required — Social Programs targeted to be transferred into social impact bonds are targeted because they are compatible with the SIB structure, not because of the merits of SIB or out of dire need.
- Financialization of public services — social impact bonds require a clear measurement of the costs and outcomes of the programs, which encourages SIB projects to "focus on financial targets rather than eliminating the underlying cause of the social problem at hand".

== Past and present SIB initiatives ==
Below are a few examples of SIB initiatives that have been launched.

=== Public safety and recidivism ===
==== United Kingdom ====
On 18 March 2010, Secretary of State for Justice Jack Straw announced a six-year Social Impact Bond (SIB) pilot scheme managed by Social Finance that will involve about 3,000 short term prisoners from Peterborough prison, serving less than 12 months, receiving intensive interventions both in prison and in the community. Funding from investors outside government will be initially used to pay for the services, which will be delivered by Third Sector providers with a proven record of working with offenders. If reoffending is not reduced by at least 7.5% the investors will receive no recompense. The Social Impact Bond in Peterborough was launched by Secretary of State for Justice Kenneth Clarke MP and Prisons Minister Crispin Blunt on 10 September 2010.

==== United States ====
New York City: In 2012 Goldman Sachs agreed to lend up to $9.6 million for rehabilitation managed by MDRC at Rikers Island jail. If successful in reducing recidivism, the program would have saved the city money, which would have paid back Goldman's capital plus a variable profit. Goldman disbursed the loan in tranches, so when evaluations by the Vera Institute of Justice found that interim targets were missed, Goldman ceased funding and partially recouped its invested capital from a partial loan guarantee from Bloomberg Philanthropies.

New York State: In mid-2012, the New York State Department of Labor (DOL) selected Social Finance US as its intermediary partner in structuring an application for federal funding for a Social Impact Bond. In 2013, New York approved $30 million in its budget to fund social impact bonds during the subsequent five years. In September 2013, New York State received a $12 million grant from the United States Department of Labor (USDOL) to fund a Pay for Success project designed to increase employment and reduce recidivism among 2,000 formerly incarcerated individuals in partnership with Social Finance US and the Center for Employment Opportunities. This was the largest grant awarded by USDOL for Pay for Success projects. Initial outcomes indicate that, at least in the first phase of these PFS projects, the interventions did not produce the desired effects of reducing recidivism and improving employment among the populations of concern.

Massachusetts: On 1 August 2012, the Commonwealth of Massachusetts announced that Third Sector Capital Partners will serve as main intermediary, in partnership with New Profit Inc., for the youth recidivism initiative. Roca, United Way of Massachusetts Bay and Merrimack Valley, and Youth Options Unlimited will also participate in the youth recidivism project.The program, called Social Innovation Financing, operates on a simple "pay for success" model, in which nonprofits must demonstrate that by keeping youth from being reincarcerated. According to the state's press release, the juvenile justice contract "will be designed with the specific goal of reducing recidivism and improving education and employment outcomes over several years for a significant segment of the more than 750 youth who exit the juvenile justice system, and the several thousand who exit the probation system annually."

Federal: The U.S. Department of Justice gave "Priority Consideration" to Fiscal Year 2012 Second Chance Act grant applications that include a Pay for Success component. The Second Chance Act (P.L. 110-199) authorizes federal grants to fund services that help reduce recidivism. In 2013, the U.S. Department of Labor awarded nearly $24 million in grants for Pay for Success projects that provide employment services to formerly-incarcerated individuals in order to increase employment and reduce recidivism.

==== Australia ====
The Government of New South Wales, Australia, announced on 20 March 2012 that it will develop a pilot to reduce adult recidivism with Social Ventures Australia and Mission Australia. Several States in Australia have now initiated social impact bonds - the latest of which is Victoria which, on 21 December 2017, announced the conclusion of a SIB deal with Sacred Heart Mission. A major external adviser to Sacred Heart Mission was Latitude Network. Also in 2017, Social Ventures Australia funded the Aspire Social Impact Bond, marking the first SIB in South Australia.

=== Rough sleeping and chronic homelessness ===
==== United Kingdom ====
Housing Minister Grant Shapps and London Mayor Boris Johnson announced in March 2012 that a Social Impact Bond would be initiated to help London's persistent rough sleepers off the streets and into secure homes. The two bonds issued under this programme were launched in December 2012.

One successful SIB in the UK is the GM Homes Partnership in Manchester which took on 356 long-term rough sleepers. According to The Guardian, three years on, in 2021, 79% of those are still accommodated with several having started employment or training and other receiving help for their mental health.

==== United States ====
Massachusetts: In the second of two pilots launched by Massachusetts in 2012, Third Sector Capital Partners joined with the Massachusetts Housing and Shelter Alliance (MHSA), main intermediary for a chronic homelessness project, as well as the Corporation for Supportive Housing and United Way. The Massachusetts Housing and Shelter Alliance represents nonprofit housing organizations that provide housing and support services, such as medical care and vocational training. The consortium' goal was to increase the number of housing units it provides to about 600 from 220.

==== Australia ====
Australia's second Social Impact Bond concerning chronic homelessness was initiated on 21 December 2017 by the Victorian Minister for Housing, Disability and Ageing. The SIB will concern three cohorts of 60 individuals, providing rapid housing and comprehensive, individualised case-management assistance for three years each. The SIB provides expansion capital for Sacred Heart Mission's 'Journey to Social Inclusion' program which had previously been through pilot testing. Lead external advisors for this SIB deal were Latitude Network.

=== Health ===
==== United States ====
Fresno, CA: In April 2013 Social Finance US and Collective Health initiated an asthma management demonstration project in Fresno, California. Fresno is one of the nation's worst places for asthma; about 20 percent of its children have been diagnosed with the disease, which takes an especially heavy toll among poor communities. Two service providers, Central California Asthma Collaborative and Clinica Sierra Vista, will work with the families of 200 low-income children with asthma to provide home care, education, and support in reducing environmental triggers ranging from cigarette smoke to dust mites.

=== Communities ===
==== United Kingdom ====
The chief secretary to the Treasury, Liam Byrne, announced that Social Impact Bond trials could be expanded across government departments. "The Department for Children, Schools and Families have pledged to explore the potential of SIBs to lever in additional resources to support early intervention approaches with children and young people", he said in Parliament. "Communities and Local Government are also working with Leeds City Council and NHS Leeds to enable them to use a SIB approach to reduce health and social care costs among older people. Similarly Bradford Metropolitan District Council are considering applying this model as part of their involvement in the government's Total Place programme."

==== United States ====
Federal: The U.S. Department of Housing and Urban Development (HUD) announced in 2013 it will provide $5 billion in grant dollars to assist in the rebuilding and strengthening effort resulting from Hurricane Sandy and encouraged the five states effected by the storm to make use of Pay for Success strategies where appropriate. In 2013, the Department of the Treasury issued a Request for Information (RFI) that will help design a proposed $300 million Incentive Fund to further expand Pay for Success. The Fund is intended to encourage cities, states and nonprofits to test new Pay for Success models. This same Fund was also part of the President's commitment of nearly $500 million in the 2013 Budget to expand Pay for Success strategies.

=== Children and families ===
==== United Kingdom ====
Social Finance worked with UK local authorities to assess the potential for social impact bonds to improve family assistance services. These studies assessed the potential of social impact bonds to fund preventive and early intervention services which improve outcomes for children and generate cost savings for Local Authorities.

In March 2012 Manchester City Council announced a social impact bond to fund multi-dimensional treatment foster care.

==== Australia ====
New South Wales: The Government of New South Wales, Australia, announced on 20 March 2012 that it will develop three pilots for child protection, foster care and juvenile justice. One of the child protection pilots is with a consortium involving the Benevolent Society, Westpac Bank and the Commonwealth Bank of Australia. The other child protection pilot is managed by UnitingCare Burnside, a division of UnitingCare Australia. The juvenile justice pilot to be delivered by Mission Australia was not initiated.

==== United States ====
Utah: In August 2013, the Goldman Sachs Urban Investment Group (UIG) together with the United Way of Salt Lake and J.B. Pritzker formed a partnership to create the first ever Social Impact Bond designed to finance early childhood. Goldman Sachs and Pritzker jointly committed as much as $7 million to finance The Utah High Quality Preschool Program, a curriculum emphasizing increasing school readiness and academic performance among at-risk 3 and 4 year olds in Utah.

Illinois: On 5 May 2014, the State of Illinois announced the state's first Pay for Success (PFS) contract will increase assistance for at-risk youth who are involved with both the child welfare and juvenile justice systems in Illinois. The first contract awarded by this innovative initiative will go to One Hope United, in partnership with the Conscience Community Network (CCN).

==== Canada ====
Saskatchewan:

"[In 2014], Saskatchewan announced its first SIB, a $1 million project to provide assisted living to young single mothers at risk in Saskatoon, designed to reduce the number of children taken into care. [...] This is a five year project which will return the original investment and a 5% return to the funders if 22 children remain with their mothers for six months after leaving the Sweet Dreams assisted living home. The return will be pro-rated if 17 to 21 children stay with their mothers and nothing, neither the original investment nor the return, will be paid if fewer than 17 children remain with their mothers."

=== Early stage exploration ===
==== United States ====
States across the country are currently exploring opportunities to use social impact bonds to achieve their social goals, including:

- California: In August 2013, Santa Barbara County released a Request for Information on social impact bonds and approved a feasibility study to explore the potential use of pay for success financing in reducing prisoner recidivism; additionally, Santa Clara agreed to fund a pilot project exploring SIB feasibility. By 2015, Santa Clara County had implemented an SIB known as Project Welcome Home, administered by a local non-profit and focused on housing the highest-need homeless people over six years.
- Colorado: In June 2013, Colorado and Denver were selected to receive support from a Harvard Kennedy School SIB Technical Assistance Lab (SIB Lab) fellow. Both jurisdictions have released a "Request for Information" (RFI) on SIBS. Denver's was implemented by February 2016. This, like Santa Clara's, emphasized reducing chronic homelessness and the negative social phenomena associated therewith.
- Connecticut: In 2013, the Department of Children and Families released a Request for Information to explore how social impact bonds might be used to address substance abuse among families involved in the child welfare system.
- Illinois: In April 2013, Governor Quinn announced that the State would pursue a Social Impact Bond program with technical support from the Harvard SIB Lab. In September, Illinois issued a "Request for Proposal" (RFP), emphasized youth engaged in the juvenile justice and/or foster care systems.
- Maryland: In 2013, Social Impact Bond legislation was introduced to the Committee on Appropriations in the Maryland House of Delegates.
- Michigan: In September 2013, Michigan was selected to receive support from the SIB Lab to develop pay for success programs funded by social impact bonds. The state initiated an RFI to obtain initial input about potential projects.
- New Jersey: In December 2012, the State Assembly Commerce and Economic Development Committee approved the New Jersey Social Innovation Act, which would establish a five-year pilot program to attract private funding to finance social services. The target areas are prevention and early intervention health care for low-income and uninsured people, in order to reduce government health care spending.
- North Carolina: In 2013, the Center for Child and Family Policy at Duke University began exploratory work concerning using SIBS for dissemination of a universal home visiting program known as Durham Connects found to reduce emergency care in infants.
- Ohio: In November 2012, Cuyahoga County released an RFP on funding social service programs through pay-for-success contracts. In the summer of 2013, the state of Ohio was selected to receive assistance from the SIB Lab.
- Oregon: The Governor's 2013-2015 budget proposal included $800,000 for the Early Learning Division. The funds are intended to cover start-up costs for a "Pilot Prevention Health and Wellness Demonstration Project for Social Impact Financing."
- South Carolina: In June 2013, South Carolina was selected to receive assistance from the SIB Lab and looks to use the support to develop a home-visiting program. In September 2012, the state issued an RFI related to Social impact bonds.
- Washington, D.C.: The District of Columbia initiated a Request for Qualifications in September 2013 for a feasibility study of DC Social impact bonds.

==== Canada ====
- In 2014, the government of Alberta created the Social Innovation Endowment Account to "fund the promotion and development of social impact bonds in Alberta".
- The government of Ontario included Social Impact Bonds in the list of innovative social financial methods to be explored as of 2016.

==== Mexico ====
- "El Futuro en Mis Manos" was piloted in 2016 in the Guadalajara metropolitan area and, during 30 months, provided assistance to more than 1300 female-headed households.

=== Education ===
==== Russia ====
- Yakutia: During the St. Petersburg International Economic Forum in June 2019, VEB.RF, the Far East Development Fund, Higher School of Economics and the Government of the Sakha (Yakutia) Republic formally agreed to perform the first pilot SIB in the Republic of Sakha (Yakutia). The project is scheduled for implementation in 2019–2022 and designed to improve schoolchildren's academic performance. The project is intended to improve the quality of general education, make human resources more competitive and transform the management mechanism of general education. About 5,000 children from 28 schools (including eight underfilled and three small-scale establishments) in the Khangalassky Municipal District are involved in the project. The project's social outcomes are measured using an educational performance index calculated as a weighted total of grades in the State Final Examinations (Basic State Examination and Unified State Examination) and academic competitions. Higher School of Economics was selected to implement the project. During three years, HSE leading experts will give the schoolchildren additional lessons (including under a distance learning programme), assist the schools in preparing personal education plans, train project managers and teachers, help the schools to organise professional communities, partnerships and educational networks, act as mentors for teachers and principals, and engage parents, the local community and businesses. The project should have a sustainable model, enabling local teachers and managers to develop their own education systems on completion of the project. The project should be able to be extended to other Russian regions. “The Far East and Baikal Region Development Fund is the project’s investor. This project is important to us, because if we achieve positive social outcomes, the project’s approaches and methods can be implemented across the Republic of Sakha (Yakutia) and in other Far Eastern regions,” CEO of the Far East and Baikal Region Development Fund Alexei Chekunkov said. The Russian Ministry of Finance drafted a Government resolution with guidelines for the regions on the implementation of pilot social impact projects in 2019–2024 in order to promote pay-for-success financing for social outcomes.

== International Development Assistance ==
United Nations Development Programme and EBRD pilot social impact bond in Armenia with the emphasis of improving the lives of smallholder farmers in the Shirak region, Ministry of Finance of the Slovak Republic provided funding for the donor study.

== Intermediaries and technical assistance providers ==
A list of more than 20 intermediaries and providers of technical assistance in the UK is maintained as part of the Big Lottery Fund's Commissioning Better Outcomes programme.

== See also ==
- Business ethics
- Sustainability bond
- Corporate social responsibility
- Disinvestment
- Dwight Hall Socially Responsible Investment Fund
- Ethical banking
- Impact investing
- Microfinance
- Social finance
- Sustainability-linked bond
- White House Office of Social Innovation and Civic Participation
- Sustainable development
- The Government Pension Fund of Norway
- Advance market commitments
