= Regis College =

Regis College may refer to:

- Regis College (Massachusetts), Weston, Massachusetts
- Regis College (Toronto), a postgraduate theological college of the University of Toronto
- Regis University, Denver, Colorado, formerly known as Regis College
