= Third Sector Capital Partners =

- Type: 501(c)(3) nonprofit advisory firm
- Industry: Policy advice
- Founded: 2011; 15 years ago San Francisco
- Founders: George Overholser, Caroline Whistler, and Drew von Glahn
- Headquarters: San Francisco and Washington DC, United States
- Area served: United States
- Website: www.thirdsectorcap.org

Third Sector Capital Partners, Inc. is a nonprofit advisory firm with offices in Boston, Massachusetts, San Francisco, California, and Washington, DC. Founded in 2011, Third Sector leads governments, nonprofits, and private funders in building evidence-based initiatives and Pay for Success projects. A 501(c)(3) nonprofit, Third Sector is supported through philanthropic and government sources.

In 2016, president and co-founder Caroline Whistler was named to the Chronicle of Philanthropy's "40 Under 40" and was named by Living Cities one of the nation's 25 Disruptive Leaders.

== History ==
Third Sector Capital Partners, Inc. was founded in 2011 by George Overholser, Caroline Whistler, and Drew von Glahn. It opened offices in San Francisco, CA in 2014 followed by offices in Washington, DC.

== Pay for Success ==
Pay for Success (PFS) is a contracting model that drives government resources toward high-performing social programs. PFS contracts track the effectiveness of programs over time to ensure that funding is directed toward programs that succeed in measurably improving the lives of people most in need.

Massachusetts was the first state in the nation to issue a competitive procurement process to obtain services using social innovation financing. Third Sector was selected to help lead both of the Commonwealth’s initial pilots through to implementation. Third Sector Capital Partners, Inc. has also launched projects in Santa Clara County, California, Salt Lake County, Utah, and Cuyahoga County, Ohio.

== Select projects ==
- Massachusetts: Youth Recidivism. On August 1, 2012, Third Sector in collaboration with New Profit, Inc., was selected as the intermediary in a PFS project with service provider, Roca, Inc. The project seeks to reduce recidivism rates and increase employment outcomes for over 900 at-risk young men.
- Massachusetts: Chronic Homelessness. On August 1, 2012, Third Sector, in partnership with the Massachusetts Housing and Shelter Alliance, was selected as the Financial Advisor to a PFS project focused on achieving reductions in chronic homelessness. Other supporting partners include the Corporation for Supportive Housing (CSH) and the United Way of Massachusetts Bay in Merrimack Valley.
- Cuyahoga County, Ohio: Pay for Success Pilot Development. Third Sector has been advising Cuyahoga County, OH in the launch of a formal Request for Response to explore a PFS project in child welfare and youth/adolescent mental and behavioral health. The procurement will pave way for up to 3 pilots by Spring 2013.
- Cuyahoga County: Second Chance Act. Third Sector assisted Cuyahoga County, OH in obtaining a $750,000 PFS grant offered by the Department of Justice Second Chance Act Program. The grant will be used to the support the development of a prisoner reentry PFS model.
- Santa Clara County Project Welcome Home. Third Sector assisted the County of Santa Clara, CA in launching the first Pay for Success project launched in the State of California. In partnership with Abode Services, the County of Santa Clara intends to serve 150-200 chronically homeless individuals that are also frequent users of the County's emergency rooms, acute mental health facilities, and jail.
- Salt Lake County Pay for Success. Salt Lake County, Utah launched two simultaneous Pay for Success project in December 2016. The initiative will address the intertwined issues of homelessness and criminal justice reform. Third Sector assisted in the construction of the two programs and will serve as advisor.
