= West Coast Infrastructure Exchange =

The West Coast Infrastructure Exchange (WCX), a State/Provincial Government-level partnership between California, Oregon, Washington, and British Columbia that was launched in 2012, conducts business case evaluations for selected infrastructure projects and connects private investment with public infrastructure opportunities. The platform aims to replace traditional approaches to infrastructure financing and development with "performance-based infrastructure" marked by projects that are funded where possible by internal rates of return, as opposed to tax dollars, and evaluated according to life-cycle social, ecological and economic impacts, as opposed to capacity addition and capital cost.

== Inception ==
According to the original Wikipedia post, created by staff of Oregon Governor John Kitzhaber in November 2012:

California, Oregon, Washington and British Columbia combined to form the West Coast Infrastructure Exchange (WCX), which was announced on Nov. 14, 2012. The partnership was launched to develop innovative methods to finance and facilitate development the infrastructure needed to improve the region's economic competitiveness, support jobs and families and to enhance and protect the quality of life on the Pacific Coast.

Public infrastructure needs are acute. All West Coast states and the province of British Columbia need to expand and upgrade energy and transport facilities, update water and wastewater treatment plants, improve airports and dams and construct other projects. At the same time, state and local governments face limits on available financing through traditional sources. The West Coast Infrastructure Exchange is designed to tap the expertise of development and finance leaders to save money and find innovative financing methods. A study commissioned by the participants supports the idea of a collaborative mechanism like the WCX and finds that infrastructure needs on the West Coast will exceed $1 trillion in the next 30 years.

The announcement was made by Oregon Gov. John Kitzhaber, California State Treasurer Bill Lockyer and Oregon State Treasurer Ted Wheeler.

The Exchange was initially coordinated by the Oregon State Treasury. Development was funded by a grant from the Rockefeller Foundation.

== Focus and activities ==
WCX is a 501(c)(3) not-for-profit organization that was formed I 2014 by the states of Oregon, Washington, and California. WCX is a publicly funded resource to public agencies within three west coast states on the topic of Performance-Based Infrastructure (PBI). WCX provides training, education, and technical assistance to interested organizations.

Performance-Based Infrastructure (PBI) is an infrastructure delivery method that consolidates responsibility for the key aspects of a project's full life cycle (design, construction, and long-term maintenance) into a single, performance-based contract with a private partner. PBI maintains public ownership of the infrastructure and can provide such benefits as increased cost and schedule certainty, shortened design and construction timelines, and long-term performance guarantees.

WCX has been recognized by multiple organizations and news outlets for its innovative efforts. WCX was also named a Harvard Ash Center Bright Idea in Government in 2015.

== See also ==
- Public-private partnerships in the United States
