= Pay-for-performance (Investment) =

A pay-for-performance fee structure, in relation to the investment industry, describes a management fee that is paid to a financial adviser or investment manager when their performance returns exceed those of their designated benchmark. The performance fee is generally calculated as a percentage of the investment outperformance gained. The rationale for a pay-for-performance fee is that it provides a low-cost base solution for investors and aligns their interests with investment managers who only get compensated for outstanding performance.

Typically, investors pay a base fee for investment management services and performance fees are paid dependent upon the investments’ performance over a given period in relation to the industry benchmark used. With increasing attention on the cost of fees for investment services, the onset of alternative investment firms including performance-based investment management firms are increasingly on the rise. One Canadian pay-for-performance firm is structured to only receive a profit when their clients’ investments outperform the industry benchmark.

== Studies ==
A 2013 study found that funds with performance fees offer better risk-adjusted returns. The introduction of a performance fee increases the funds’ ex post four-factor alpha by on average 83 basis points per quarter. The results hold also when using Sharpe ratio and the raw quarterly return as dependent variables. The use of performance fees does not increase funds’ volatility levels relative to funds without such fees. Furthermore, funds with performance fees, on average, offer lower management fees than funds without these fee structures.

An additional study by The Journal of Finance explains that one of the advantages to incentive, or performance-based, fees is that they align manager interest with investor interests. On this point, both groups do better when the investment does better. It is argued that management effort is generally higher for funds with performance fees. Since investors realize that funds with performance fees draw the best managers and elicit the most effort, investors may be willing to place more money in these funds.

== See also ==
- Active management
- Performance-related pay
- Performance fee
- Investment management
