= Social finance =

Mobilising capital for projects with social or environmental goals

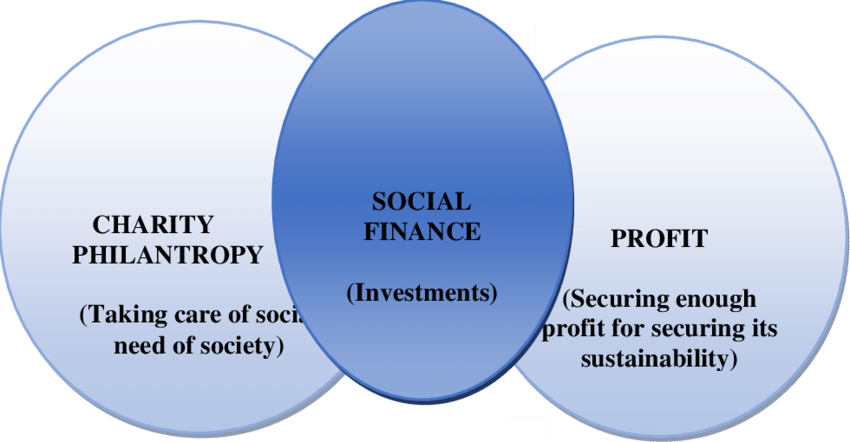
Social finance serves as a middle ground between traditional business, whose main driver is to achieve financial value and traditional charity, whose main driver is to achieve social value.

Social finance is a category of financial services that aims to leverage private capital to address challenges in areas of social and environmental need. Having gained popularity after the 2008 financial crisis, it is notable for its public benefit focus. Mechanisms of creating shared social value are not new; however, social finance is conceptually unique as an approach to solving social problems while simultaneously creating economic value. Unlike philanthropy, which has a similar mission-motive, social finance secures its own sustainability by being profitable for investors. Capital providers lend to social enterprises, who in turn, by investing borrowed funds in socially beneficial initiatives, deliver investors measurable social returns in addition to traditional financial returns on their investment.

Consensus has yet to be established on a formal definition of social finance due to a lack of clarity around its scope and intent; however, it is said to include elements of impact investing, socially responsible investing, and social enterprise lending. Investors include charitable foundations, retail investors, and institutional investors. Notable examples of social finance instruments are social impact bonds and social impact funds.

Since the 2008 financial crisis, the social finance industry has been experiencing a period of accelerated growth as shifts in investor sentiment have increased demand for ethically responsible investment alternatives by retail investors. Mainstream sources of capital have entered the market as a result, including Deutsche Bank, which in 2011 became the first commercial bank to raise a social investment fund.

New research in the field calls for increasing the role of government in social finance to help overcome the challenges the industry currently faces, including the struggle to produce desirable returns for investors, high start-up and regulatory costs, neglect from mainstream banks, and a lack of access to retail investors. Proponents of social finance argue that until these gaps are addressed, mass participation in social finance will be prevented.

== Origin ==
The history of social finance has its origins in 20th-century neoliberal economics and the ideas that it proposed, such as an emphasis on the role of the free market in society. The concept itself first came in to use in the 1970s in the United States, where it emerged as an innovative approach to solve social problems while creating economic value. The appeal to government was clear: access to swaths of private capital to fund social programs at a time of deep austerity and retrenchment of state programs under neoliberal politics. In 1977 in the United States, the Community Reinvestment Act provided the impetus for financial institutions to invest in underserved local regions and marginalized sectors of the economy, furthering state transfers of wealth to the private sector. This spawned a plethora of community development financial institutions, which deployed significant amounts of capital in affordable housing, renewable energy, and financial inclusion across the United States. Furthermore, many prominent foundations, including the Ford, Rockefeller, and MacArthur Foundations, have actively invested their endowments in a manner that aligns with this practice of mission-related investing.

Some scholars contest that social finance has its origins in Islamic finance, which was practiced by the sharia-compliant Islamic economies of the 1960s and which is characterized by socially responsible investment.

== Market structure ==
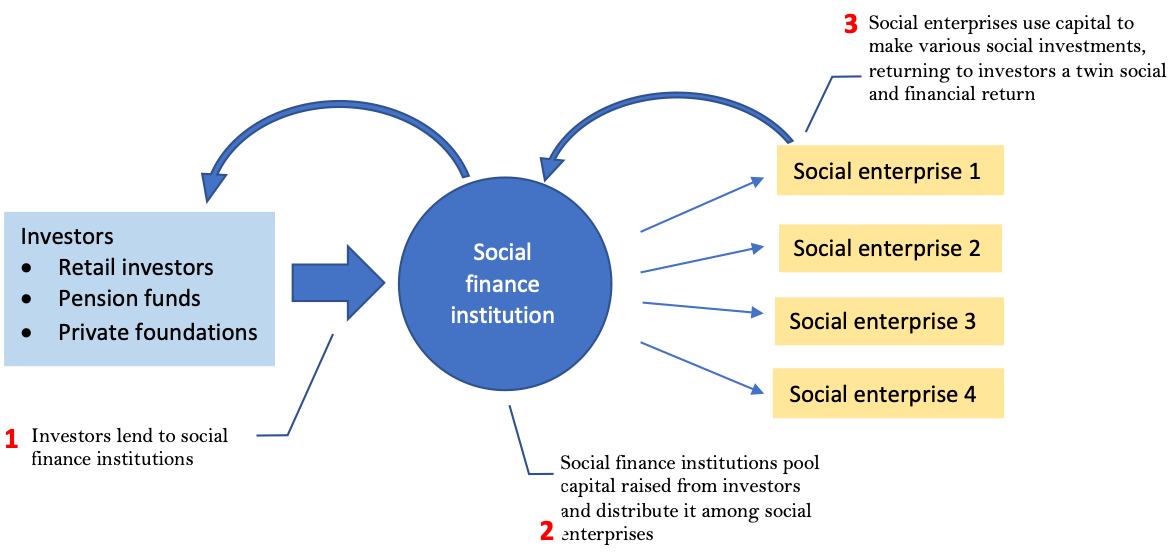
Capital flows in the social finance marketplace.

The social finance ecosystem is composed of four key groups:

1. Investors: Investors, or capital providers, serve as the initial and primary source of capital in social finance. Examples include retail investors, high-net-worth individuals, pension funds, charitable foundations, and private foundations.
2. Social enterprises: Social enterprises represent the demand for investment in social finance. They absorb the capital invested by investors, reinvest this money in various socially beneficial initiatives, or social investments, and finally deliver investors twin social and financial returns on their investment. Examples include nonprofit organizations such as the Bill and Melinda Gates Foundation.
3. Social finance institutions: Social finance institutions act as financial intermediaries by linking the supply and demand of capital. They are responsible for raising funds from investors, pooling these funds, and redistributing them to social enterprises. Social enterprises are ranked by profitability, and preference is given to organizations with strong track records of effective social service.
4. Intermediaries: Intermediaries facilitate and oversee the myriad connections between the first three groups. They include regulators, trade groups, and service providers.

== Scale of operations ==
Research reveals that the term social finance is familiar mainly to people working in the niche sector of financial services. Since the 2008 financial crisis, however, the social finance industry has experienced a period of accelerated growth and institutional uptake. For example, in 2011 Deutsche Bank became the first commercial bank to raise a social investment fund, in 2012 Goldman Sachs floated Social Impact Bonds in the US, and in 2012 the European Investment Fund made a direct investment into the UK social finance marketplace.

Explanation of the post-crisis popularization of social finance is the subject of extensive academic research. Social theorist Bill Maurer explains it as the result of shifts in investor sentiment in the aftermath of the 2008 financial crisis. Social finance, through its innovative approach to solving social problems while creating economic value, has met the need of disaffected retail investors who seek ethical investment alternatives following revelations in the aftermath of the 2008 financial crisis of widespread unethical business practices by mainstream corporations in pursuit of profit. As a result, Maurer suggests, mainstream corporations looking to rebuild their reputations are now entering the market, bringing with them significant inflows of capital and investment.

One study, which provides a statistical analysis of participation, satisfaction, and retention rates in the European social finance market, suggests that the 2008 financial crisis occurred at a time when social finance organizations were beginning to develop track records that demonstrated their market feasibility. Geobey and Harji, in their anecdotal study of social finance in the post-crisis United States, document similar findings in the North American case. Their study, which synthesizes interviews with executives from North American social finance organizations, confirms that demonstration of commercial viability by current actors in the North American social finance market since 2008 has proved themselves to mainstream financiers, enabled the scaling up of operations, and created a "signalling effect" that has attracted new investment and ultimately staved off existential questions that have been asked of the social finance industry.

Proponents of social finance Kent Baker and John Nofsinger claim that these trends of institutionalisation will lead to the legitimisation of the social finance industry, give way to the widespread institutional uptake of social finance, and ultimately embed social finance as a mainstream asset class of financial investments among the likes of stocks and bonds. However, several unfavourable trends have also become apparent, including uneven uptake. Key challenges remain, including the struggle to produce desirable returns for investors, high start-up and regulatory costs, and lack of access to retail investors. Baker and Nofsinger argue that until these gaps are addressed, mass participation in social finance will be prevented.

== Examples ==
=== Social impact bonds ===
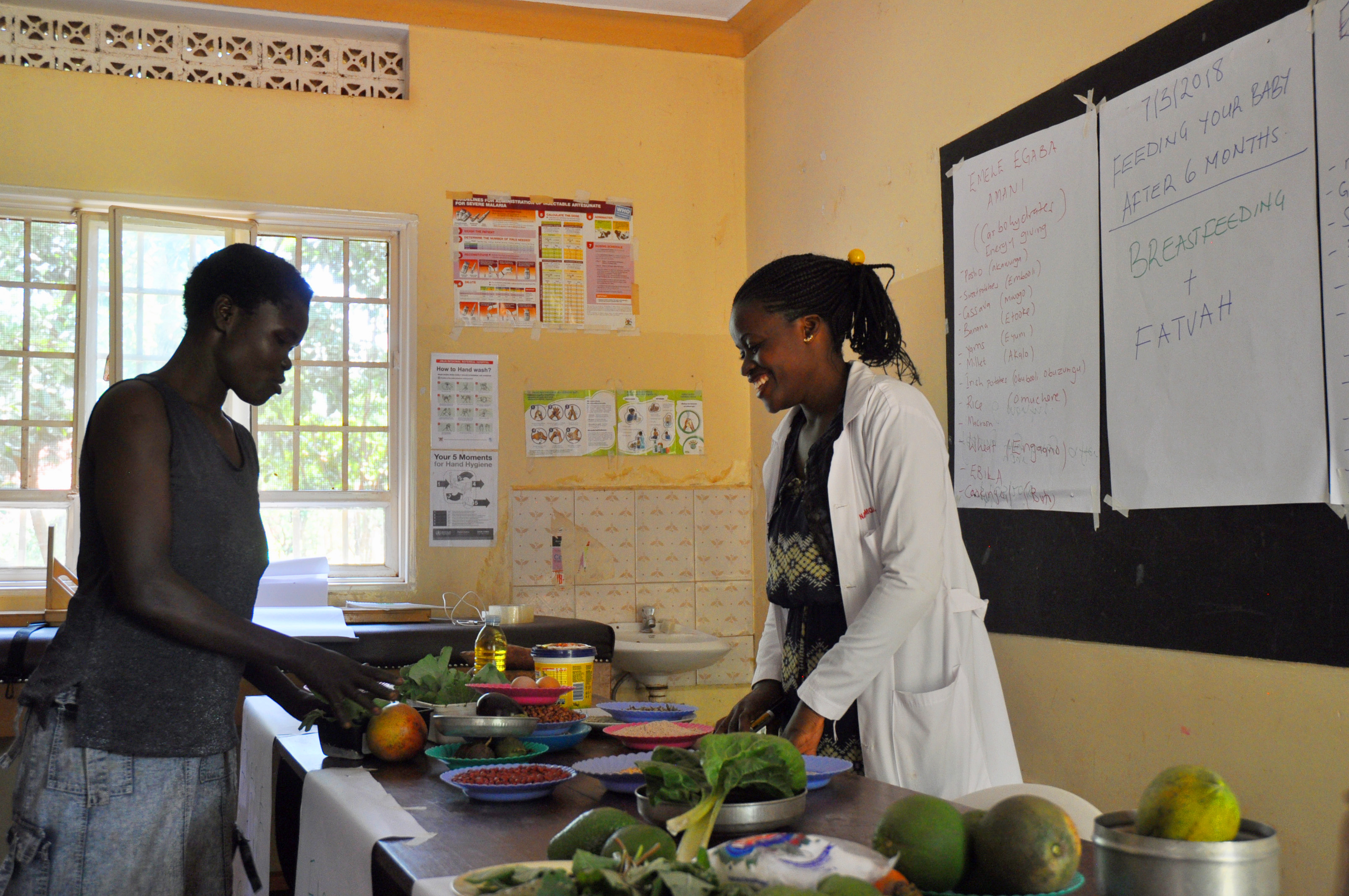
A caregiver teaches mothers with small children about nutrition at a hospital in Jinja, Uganda as part of a program funded by the Social Innovation Fund.

Of all forms of social finance, the most used and developed is the Social impact bond (SIB). SIBs are structured financial instruments that raise private capital to fund prevention and early intervention programs in areas of pressing social need, reducing the need for expensive safety net services in the future. Investors provide up-front capital to fund these programs and receive a prearranged amount of money (including the principal plus some financial return) if performance results are achieved.

Funds from SIBs are spent on services like counselling, health care, and detention, with the aim of reducing the need for these services in the first place. Proceeds from the savings are used to reward investors for facilitating the process. Unlike conventional bonds, however, SIBs operate on a pay-for-performance basis, in which bondholders are repaid only if the program’s outcome targets are achieved.

=== Social investment funds ===
Social investment funds (SIFs) pool funds from investors to provide not-for-profit organisations with “patient working capital” (funding with a longer-term repayment schedule). For example, the Social Innovation Fund which awards grants of up to $10 million per year to social organisations through a competitive process.

== Comparisons with other forms of social welfare enhancement ==
Efforts to create mechanisms to allocate capital for combined social and economic value creation are not new. Social finance is conceptually a very different approach to social welfare enhancement, however, in that, by combining the ideas of neoliberal markets (in creating a profit and financial return) with taking care of social needs (in the way that a charity would), social finance secures its own sustainability by being profitable for those who fund these organisations. It is funded by investors, who receive a return on their investment, rather than donors, who forgo their contribution at the time of donation. The ‘blended’ social and financial returns are a defining characteristic of social finance and distinguish it from related practices, such as not-for-profit investing, charity, and philanthropy.

=== Comparison with corporate social responsibility ===
Leading scholars in the field of social innovation, such as Stephen Sinclair, Neil McHugh, and Michael Roy, question the need for social finance given the extensive existing frameworks that govern corporate social responsibility in capital markets. Their critical analysis of the efficacy of social impact bonds concludes that social finance draws capital away from productive investment opportunities and exacerbates allocative inefficiencies caused by excessive existing government regulation. Separate studies reaffirm these claims and argue that improved efficiencies are needed before social finance is marketized.

Proponents of social finance concede that while its intent overlaps with that of corporate social responsibility, social finance provides a means for greater direct investment in addressing social challenges, whereas existing corporate governance frameworks work at the fringe. Othmar Lehner, Associate Professor of Social Enterprise at the University of Oxford Saïd Business School, states that while traditional financial institutions typically prioritise profitability and regard their societal impact only so much as regulation requires, social finance enterprises set social objectives as the first goal of their capital allocation strategies, channelling investors’ funds directly to organisations that prioritise projects with socially positive outcomes. In his opening chapter in the Routledge Handbook of Social and Sustainable Finance, he proposes social finance as a new source of capital to supplement existing sources, such as charitable donations and philanthropic grants, which have historically been the main source of financing social change, from poverty alleviation to international development and income inequality. Social theorists Jed Emerson and Alex Nicholls reaffirm these claims by suggesting that social finance provides the greater direct investment required to address various social challenges and fill the capital gap that currently exists, given that many social needs have increased in severity, complexity, and scale, while charitable donations are on the decline.

== Challenges and future direction ==
The social finance industry faces several headwinds, including the struggle to produce desirable returns for investors, high start-up and regulatory costs, neglect from mainstream banks, and lack of access to retail investors, an area that is believed to have perhaps the most demand. Furthermore, although the industry has matured, it has done so at an uneven pace across its ecosystem, as evidenced in the United States in particular. While capital flows and trust between suppliers (investors) and demanders (social finance institutions) of capital are improving, regulatory developments have lagged behind. One study concedes that the rapid growth of social finance in the 21st century has exposed its self-regulatory capacity, the need to strengthen governance mechanisms, and the need to develop sophisticated intermediaries to link capital and opportunities. The source suggests that institutional uptake of social finance will be held back by these headwinds and, unless the gaps are addressed, the social finance industry will be unable to maintain its current growth rate into the future.

Consensus of experts in the field maintains that the role of government in social finance will be central to addressing the challenges that the sector currently faces. Sustainability strategist Coro Strandberg proposes the following six public policy changes to address these challenges:

- Legislative reform: recast legislation from a for-profit/not-for-profit framework to a sustainable and effective framework
- Tax incentives: offer tax incentives to encourage investments in social finance
- Capacity building: create a framework that permits organisations to build capacity through capital retention
- Community investment: create an enabling environment for trustees to consider community investments consistent with their fiduciary duty
- Regulatory reform: create a permissive framework for foundations to support social finance
- Formalised sustainability plans: negotiate an allocation from the New Deal for Cities for the articulation of environmental, social, cultural, and economic goals into municipal sustainability plans and checklists

== See also ==
- Social enterprise
- Impact investing
- Microfinance
- Social impact bond
- Socially-responsible investing
