= Social Finance (consultancy) =

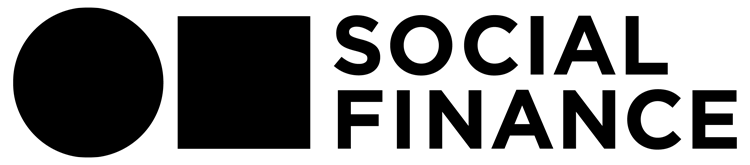
- Type: nonprofit
- Industry: Social enterprise Consulting
- Founded: 2007
- Headquarters: Boston, United States
- Key people: Tracy Palandjian (CEO)
- Revenue: $32million (USD)
- Website: socialfinance.org.uk socialfinance.org

Social Finance is a not for profit consultancy organization organisation that partners with governments, service providers, the voluntary sector and the financial community to find better ways of tackling social problems in the UK and globally, founded in 2007

== History ==
Social Finance's initial team supported the work of the Commission on Unclaimed Assets, which recommended the establishment of a Social Investment Bank in March 2007 and in turn developed the blueprint for what is now named Big Society Capital. Initially financed by a group of philanthropists, later financial support included charitable trusts and foundations including: Esmée Fairbairn Foundation, Rockefeller Foundation and the Big Lottery Fund.

Social Finance helped develop the first Social Impact Bond project in the world in the UK in 2010, a six-year social impact bond pilot scheme run by Social Finance to see around 3,000 short-term prisoners from Peterborough prison, serving less than 12 months, receiving intensive interventions both in prison and in the community. Funding from investors outside government was initially used to pay for the services, which were delivered by Third Sector providers with a proven track record of working with offenders. If re-offending is not reduced by at least 7.5% through all tranches, the investors will receive no recompense. In August 2014, the first set of results were released, showing that the Social Impact Bond reduced reoffending by 8.4 per cent. This was not high enough to trigger any repayments to investors at this point (10% reduction would have been necessary for payments to investors by August 2014) but was on track for payments to investors in the next tranche – as an 8.4% reduction is in line with the overall reduction rate needed.

In January 2011, Social Finance US was launched to bring social impact bonds to the US market.

Social Finance Israel was founded in 2013 by Ronald Cohen and Yaron Neudorfer. Israel's first social impact bond, launched in 2016, sought to reduce dropout among computer science students at the University of Haifa and the Academic College of Tel Aviv-Yaffo. Bonds in mental health, welfare, education and employment followed, including four career impact bonds, in which investors finance technology training upfront and graduates repay them out of their subsequent wages rather than a public body paying for outcomes. In 2025 a US$12.3 million programme to raise mathematics attainment in Israel's Bedouin community was launched. By the mid-2020s the organisation reported twelve outcomes-based projects, some US$25.6 million in investment commitments and around 7,500 participants.
