= Terraced Gardens, Rivington =

Landscaped woodland in Lancashire, England

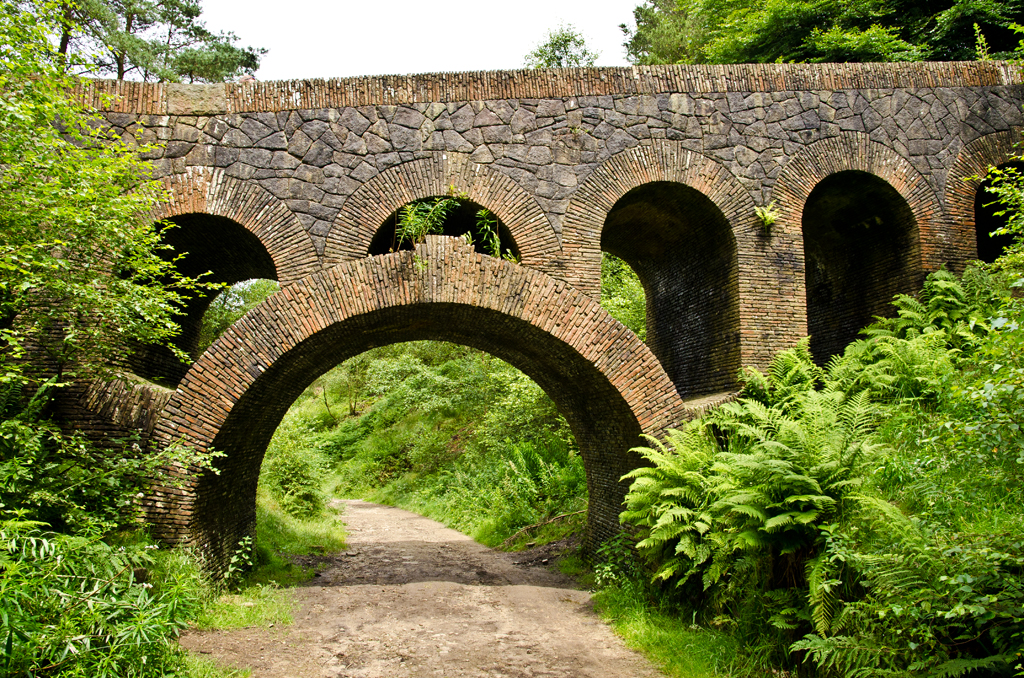
- Seven Arch Bridge, Rivington

- Location within Lancashire
- Location: Chorley
- Coordinates: 53°37′11″N 2°32′53″W
- Created: 1900
- Operator: Rivington Heritage Trust on behalf of UU
- Status: Green Flag Award
- Designation: Grade II

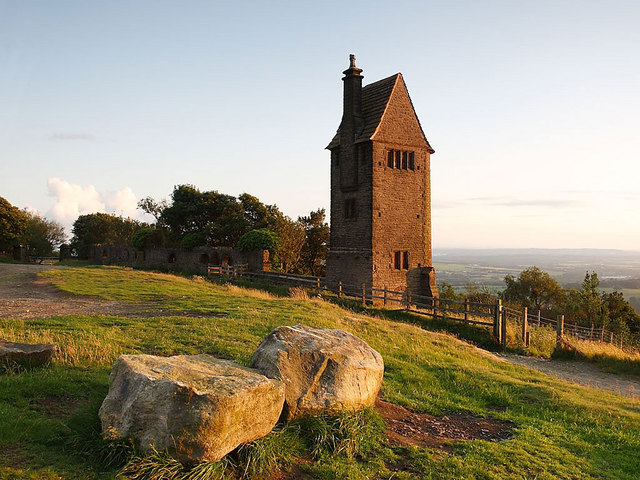
The Pigeon Tower, Rivington

Terraced Gardens of Rivington (Leverhulmes Former Gardens) is a landscaped woodland on the hillside of Rivington Pike, in Rivington Parish in the Chorley Borough of Lancashire, England, originally designed as a Garden by T.H. Mawson and built as curtilage to a home of the soap magnate Viscount Leverhulme; as such, the area is not part of Lever Park. It has a Green Flag Award. The gardens contains and abuts the SSSI of the West Pennine Moors. Today the former gardens are Grade II listed and contain eleven Grade II structures. The original design had three elements — the upper part being in the romanesque architectural style, the lower section, known as the Ravine, was a woodland with a man-made stream, and a Japanese-style garden, with a man-made pond constructed of Pulmonite which remains today. The gardens are leased to Rivington Heritage Trust by United Utilities and are undergoing restoration and preservation.

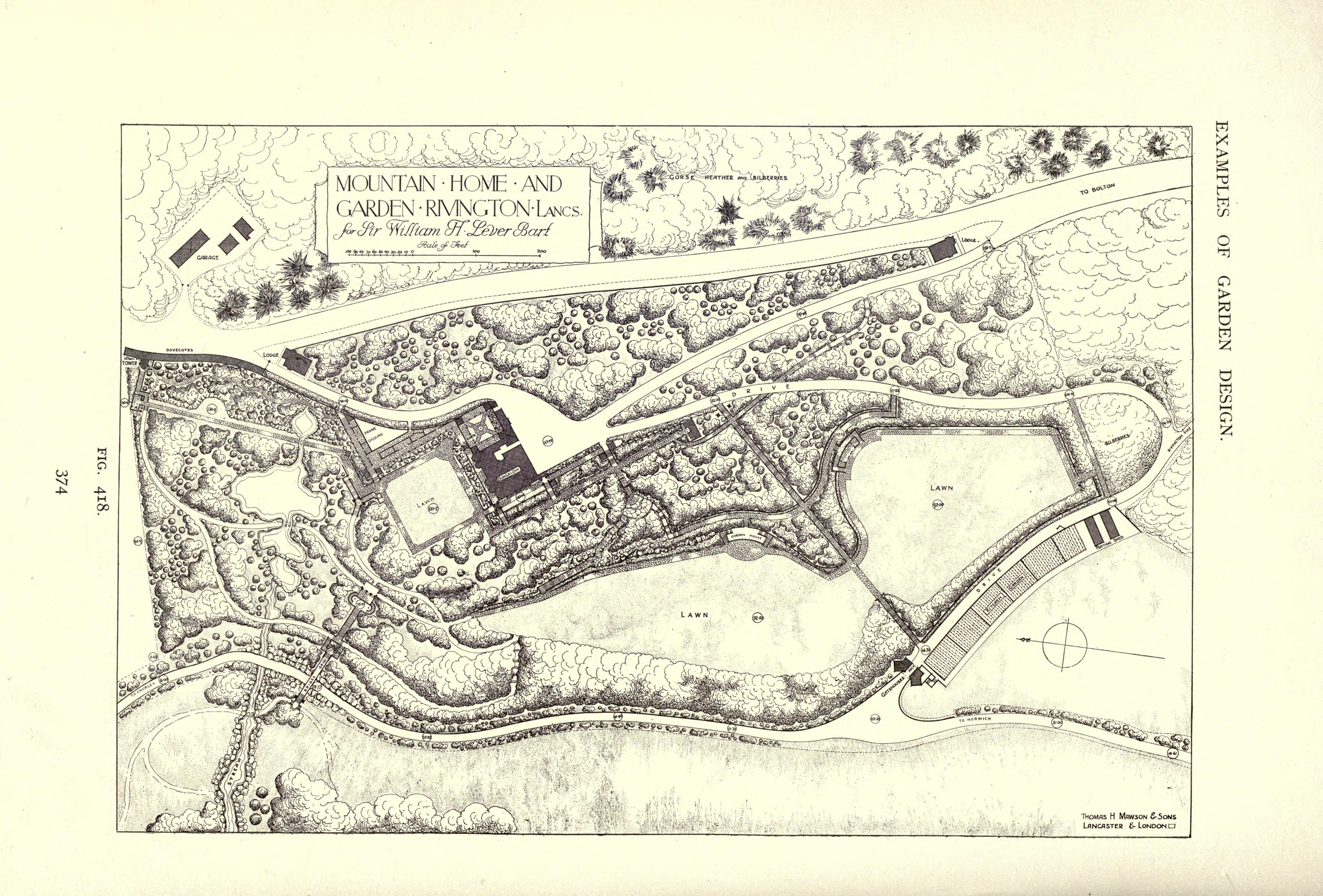
Rivington Gardens design

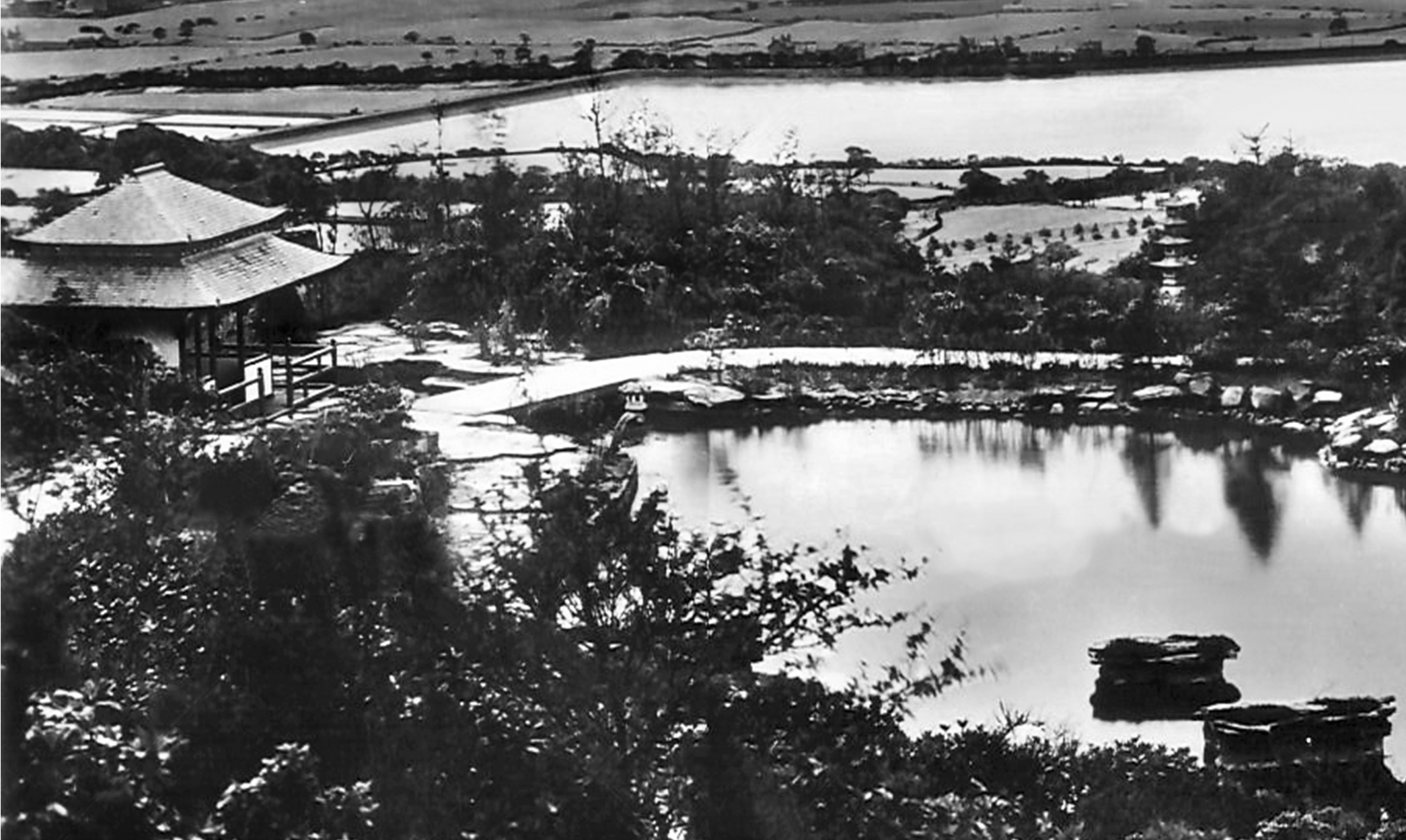
Japanese Lake 1925

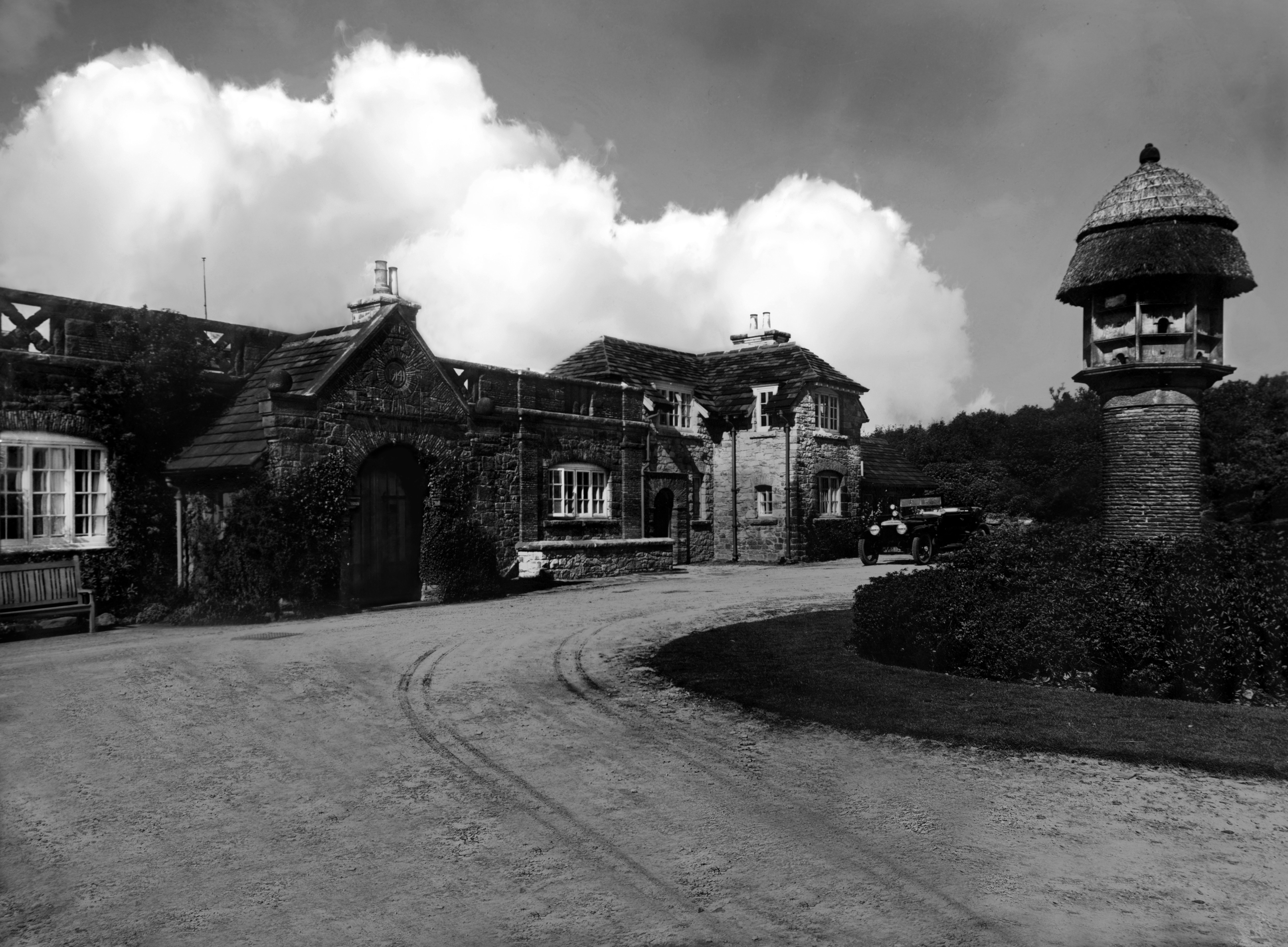
Leverhulmes Bungalow 1925

== The Bungalow ==
The original gardens were created to serve a home called the Bungalow (demolished in 1948) belonging to Leverhulme, a founder of Lever Brothers, today known as Unilever. The site has surviving stone structures that formed part of the Italian-style gardens designed by Thomas Mawson between 1905 and 1922. Inspired by Villa d’Este near Rome, its design features in his book 'The Art and Craft of Garden Making, published in 1912. There were four lodge houses acting as gatehouses of the grounds. Three were small prefabricated cottage-style properties, the fourth was Stone House Lodge, which had a design with an archway incorporated and build over the entrance.

Roynton Cottage was built on the hillside and was a large prefabricated wooden structure, purchased from the Portable Building Company, Manchester, earth was first broken for it in 1900, this wooden structure was destroyed 1913 in an arson attack by suffragette Edith Rigby The home and grounds were referred to in the Liverpool Corporation Act 1902 as 'The Bungalow', owned by William Hesketh Lever, was protected from being taken by the water company without an agreement, the act also protected Leverhulmes shooting rights. This first building became two stories in 1912 just prior to the fire that destroyed it. Its replacement, designed by his old friend Jonathan Simpson, was built of stone in 1914 at first as a single-story structure with Pergolas, a courtyard, and an aviary. The courtyard was developed into a ballroom and a second floor was added over the servant's quarters as a housekeepers' room in 1923. The building sat on an elevation higher than what became known as the Orchestral lawn, featuring its sundial and a lower elevation than the Pigeon Tower. The current Sun Dial is a reproduction of the missing original donated by the local quarry operator in 2019.

The main building was accessed by a driveway from Belmont Road. Below the level of the Bungalow is a large stone retaining wall, a section with steps that has arrowslits. Below this level is the Italian-style lake, a small former boating lake that is a feature of this section of the former garden. During the Leverhulme era, the Bungalow and Rivington Hall were home to a highly valuable collection of antiques, from paintings, furniture, statues, pottery, and tapestries. Leverhulmes collection and all household and garden items, even the pigeons, were sold by auction through Knight Frank & Rutley after his death in 1925. A Japanese style garden was added in 1923, its features have since been lost, but the pond remains.

The artist Alfred East stayed at Roynton Cottage in the summer of 1909. Lever commissioned a series of paintings of the surrounding landscape, the reservoirs, the country park, the village, and the pike. Lever gave 15 of them to Bolton Art Gallery and others to Bolton School, the Walker Art Gallery in Liverpool and the Lady Lever Art Gallery at Port Sunlight. East gave two watercolors, A glimpse of Rivington Water and In Rivington Park to Kettering Museum and Art Gallery. The gallery acquired an oil painting [From] Rivington Pike that East exhibited at the Royal Academy in 1913 in the 1960s.

The area is now woodland with remains including foundations of the bungalow, a number of stone summer houses, footpaths, steps, bridges, three ponds, streams, and the restored Pigeon Tower.

=== Pigeon Tower (Dovecote) ===
The well-known landmark, reroofed in 2005 and again restored in 2018, is known by various names including Lookout Tower, Dovecote Tower and the Pigeon Tower. It was built between 1905 and 1909 and was a feature created by Mawson as part of an overall design, erected as a birthday present for Leverhulme's wife. Above the ornate fireplace on the upper floor is an inscription of their initials, spelling WHEEL, William Hesketh Elizabeth Ellen Lever and Leverhulme's motto, ‘MUTARE VEL TIMERE SPERNO’ ‘I spurn the fear to change’. The building features a spiral stone staircase and four floors.

=== Ravine ===
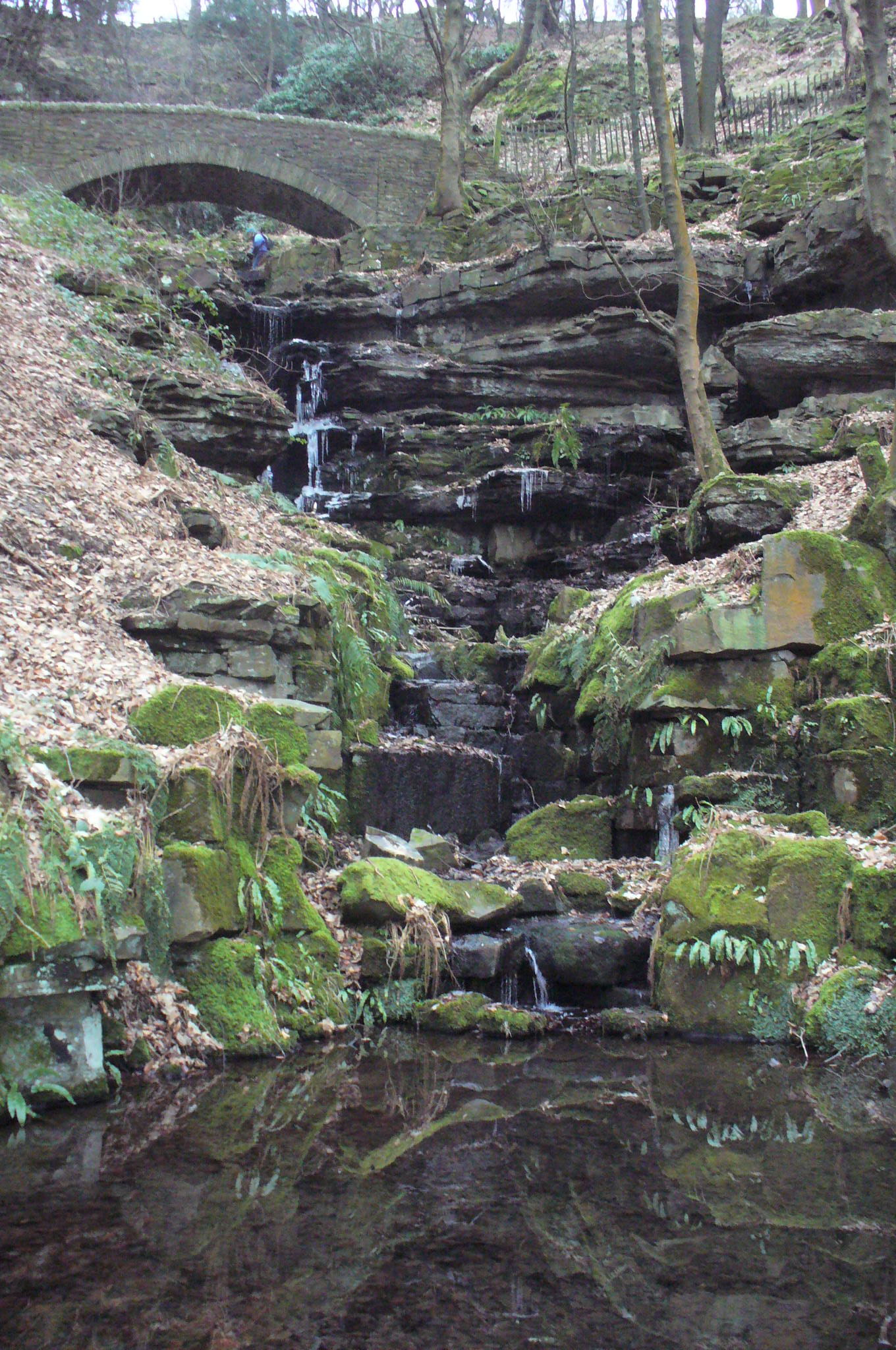
Ravine, Terraced Gardens

Further down the hillside, a section was built in 1921 as a man-made ravine, which along with the Japanese Garden built 1922 made use of artificial rock known as Pulhamite.

=== Magee Era ===
After Lever's death, The Bungalow and grounds were purchased by the Bolton brewer, John Magee during which time he opened the gardens on open days for charity fundraising. Magee was a resident there from 1925 until his death in 1939, during which time he converted part of the great lawn into a tennis court for his daughters. After his death his executor offered the property to Bolton Council who turned it down, fearing the effect of increased local rates needed to cover maintenance costs. Liverpool Corporation then purchased the property in late 1939 in turbulent times just prior to the Second World War. During the war, the building and grounds were requisitioned by the military, and a significant decoy site was nearby. The bungalow was damaged while in military use and had significant neglect during the war.

In 1945 there was hope use could be found of the Bungalow with use by charities, however, the corporation objected and insisted it must be used as a private dwelling, this prevented charities, and voluntary groups from coming forward, with no buyers and with a great level of neglect and repairs needed demolition was announced 1947 and went ahead by 1948. The Liverpool Corporation Act required that the land owners consent always be obtained for commercial use, since the water company took ownership they have operated without restriction. Protective covenants in the sale from Leverhulme are not enforced.

==== Great Lawn ====
A substantial change during the Magee era was the conversion of a large area known as 'The Great Lawn' to private tennis courts, this site has been granted planning consent in 2021 by Chorley Council for the Heritage Trust to hold weddings and wedding receptions, with marquee, catering trailers and temporary toilets. Part of the site is designated as a Site of Special Scientific Interest Ecological Mitigation Measures were discharged in 2018. In 2022 the public toilets serving the Terraced Gardens and wider area were ripped out and converted to a Cafe / Takeaway without replacements.

=== Preservation ===
Liverpool City Council, the former owner, neglected the gardens and planned to demolish the structures and clear the site in 1967, after a public outcry, the Chorley local authority moved to protect the garden's structures by ensuring listed status thus saving the Terraced Gardens from bulldozers.

By 1974 the park and gardens had passed to the North West Water Authority from Liverpool Corporation, and to United Utilities on privatisation. In the mid-1970s the landowner planned to demolish the remaining garden structures, this was prevented by intervention with listed building status by Chorley Council. From 1976 a local voluntary group, the Bolton Conservation Volunteers stepped in and cleared overgrowth and worked to maintain what had by then become an important public asset. The site was used for unofficial Music festivals in 1976 and 1977.

==== Blue Planet Scheme ====
Rivington Heritage Trust, a body set up in 1997 by United Utilities in order to obtain £15 million in funding for 'Blue Planet Park' had its plans rejected for funding by the Millennium Commission which would have seen them take over all of Lever Park and Rivington Pike, plans were opposed by six regional MPs and were met with huge local opposition. A concern was that the area would be used as a venue for music festivals and other events and fees would be charged, Sue Wright, Media Relations Manager for North West Water made a public statement saying they would never do so. The Bill and plan was rejected. Despite this the trust now hold regular music festivals and other events. The Terraced Gardens are available for hire.

Blue Planet associated planning applications were Restoration of semi-derelict landscaped gardens including rebuilding of Stone House Lodge, Tea Houses, Visitors' Pavilion & Bothy, Ref. No: 96/00848/FUL, Application for Listed Building Consent for restoration of various structures, Ref. No: 96/00849/LBC, Infrastructure including car parks, access roadways, paths and avenues, park & ride system, interpretation & screening, Ref. No: 96/00851/FUL all applications were withdrawn. The water company withdrew its bill in parliament in 1997, known as the Lever Park Act. Plans were put on hold by 1998.

All Rhododendron were removed from the gardens in 2006 after Ramorum Disease was found at the site. The site is now a managed woodland.

==== Rivington Heritage Trust ====
Although Rivington Heritage Trust abandoned much of the original Blue Planet Scheme and formed a plan to proceed gradually whilst lobbying and obtaining public support, by 2013 they had succeeded in obtaining £60,000 in grant funding from the Heritage Lottery Fund the Big Lottery Fund and presented new plans for the Rivington Terraced Gardens. By 2016 the trust and Groundwork Cheshire Lancashire and Merseyside with United Utilities assisting were successful in obtaining a grant of £3.4 million from the Heritage Lottery Fund to conserve and repair the Rivington Terraced Gardens and remaining Grade II listed structures. A company named 'Historic Property Restoration Ltd' of North Shields, specialists in work on Listed Buildings were awarded a contract to complete some of the work. A lease of 50 years was also agreed in 2016 by United Utilities to the Rivington Heritage Trust. The Clearance work has been undertaken by unpaid volunteers. The trust comprises a number of local councillors and employees of United Utilities.

The former gardens are now used to hold a variety of events, mainly at the Great Lawn, former Tennis Lawns, and Italian Lake and Orchestral lawn. There are now private events held here and it is available for hire for weddings. The Lancashire Environmental Fund awarded a grant of £23,000 in 2022 to improve accessibility from Lower House car park via Roynton Road to improve access at the site.

The trust has ongoing fundraising operations including a scheme which is known as "Squarea" the sponsorship covers a 10 square meter virtual patch, helping with running costs for five year by donating £20. Sponsors are also listed in a roll call in gratitude. In addition it also fundraises through selling merchandise. It's visitor center is now located at Great House Farm, off Rivington Lane.

==== Public Access ====
Although the Terraced Gardens are not part of Lever Park a large area has right to roam and there is a public footpath, although officially never closed the trust charges admission during events and part is used for private hire, at which time public access is blocked. The lower section of the grounds, the ravine is usually freely accessible for members of the public.

After the demolition in 1948 for half a century, the public could roam the whole site at will. Rivington former Japanese and Kitchen Gardens within the Bungalow Grounds are now part of an extensive area of open access land recorded at Lancashire County Council and has a right to roam protected by the statutory powers in the Countryside and Rights of Way Act 2000. There is a public footpath and a bridleway from Lever Park to Rivington Pike and Terraced Gardens. The public footpath number 82 runs through the gardens from the Ravine via the former Japanese and Kitchen Gardens, which is also an area of open access land with a right to roam, passing upward past the Great Lawn and an area of Bilberries part of the West Pennine Moors SSSI, toward the site of the former Bungalow and landmark Pigeon Tower then heading to Rivington Pike via Belmont Road.

Rivington Pike has access via Belmont Road (USRN 7400767) and is an open public road from Horwich, the road becomes rougher and less maintained the further up the hill it climbs in the direction of the Pigeon Tower, where it splits. The descending road there leads to Lower House car park but the surface of the road is washed away. Roynton Road (USRN: 7400820) provides access to the hillside and the Terraced Gardens from Lever Park and Sheep House Lane, from the direction of Chorley, Belmont and Horwich, the route has locked gates.

At Rivington Terraced Gardens Wheelchair access is possible for all-terrain wheelchairs to attend events via the entrance from Lower House Car Park to the great lawn by arrangement.

== Listed buildings and structures ==
=== Key ===
Grade	Criteria
II	Buildings of national importance and special interest.

Name and location	Photograph	Grade	Date	Notes
Loggia c. 70 metres west of Pigeon tower in Lord Leverhulme's Terraced Gardens; 53.6242°N 2.5473°W		II	1906	The remains of a loggia with arches overlooking a former boating lake in the Terraced Gardens, a former private gardens designed by Thomas Mawson for William Lever.
Two archways in Lord Leverhulme's Terraced Gardens; 53.6233°N 2.5471°W		II	1906	These archways are an intact element of the remains of private gardens designed by Thomas Mawson for Leverhulme's Rivington Bungalow.
Pigeon Tower north east corner of Lord Leverhulme's Terraced Garden; 53.6243°N 2.5463°W		II	1905 and 1909	The Pigeon Tower was built in gritstone with four storeys, each a single room., on the boundary of the Terraced Gardens. It has a steeply pitched roof and a corbelled chimney. On the west side is a semi-circular stair turret with a conical roof. The fourth storey, a sitting room, has four light mullioned windows on two sides. The second and third storeys are a dovecote. On the west wall are square pigeon holes with perching ledges.
Seven Arch Bridge in Lord Leverhulme's Terraced Gardens; 53.6235°N 2.5485°W		II	1910	The bridge, crossing over Royton Road within the Terraced Gardens has random sandstone rubble walls and round stone slate arches and parapets. The large round archway is crossed by six small arches. It carries a footpath over an old roadway. In memoirs recalling after dinner stories the second viscount Leverhulme thought the bridge design was influenced by one in Nigeria, however no similar bridge exists there and is more likely the design is based on the Pont du Gard, France.

== Gallery Modern Day ==
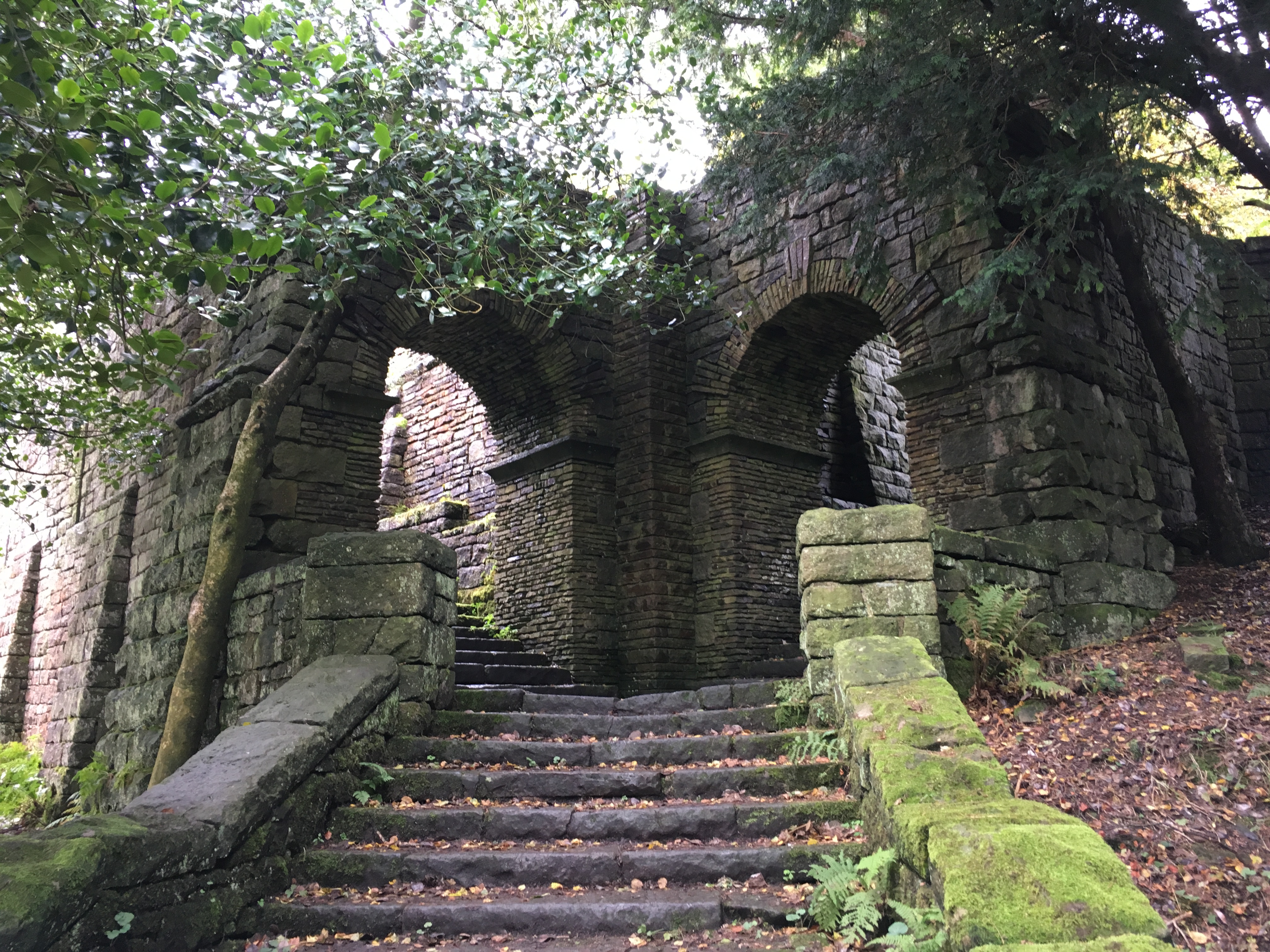
Two archways, Rivington Gardens

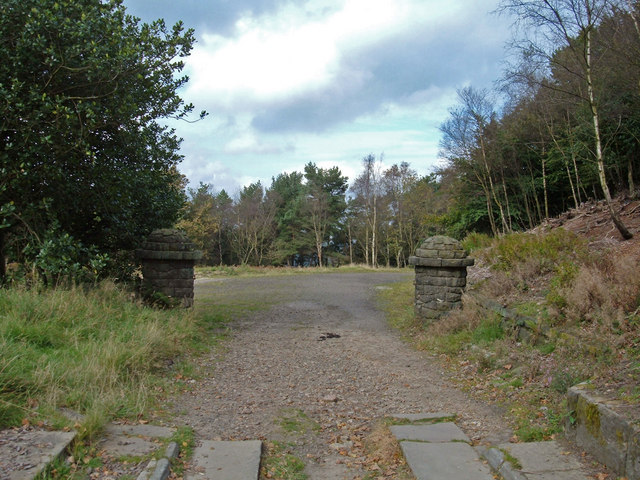
Site of former Stone House entrance

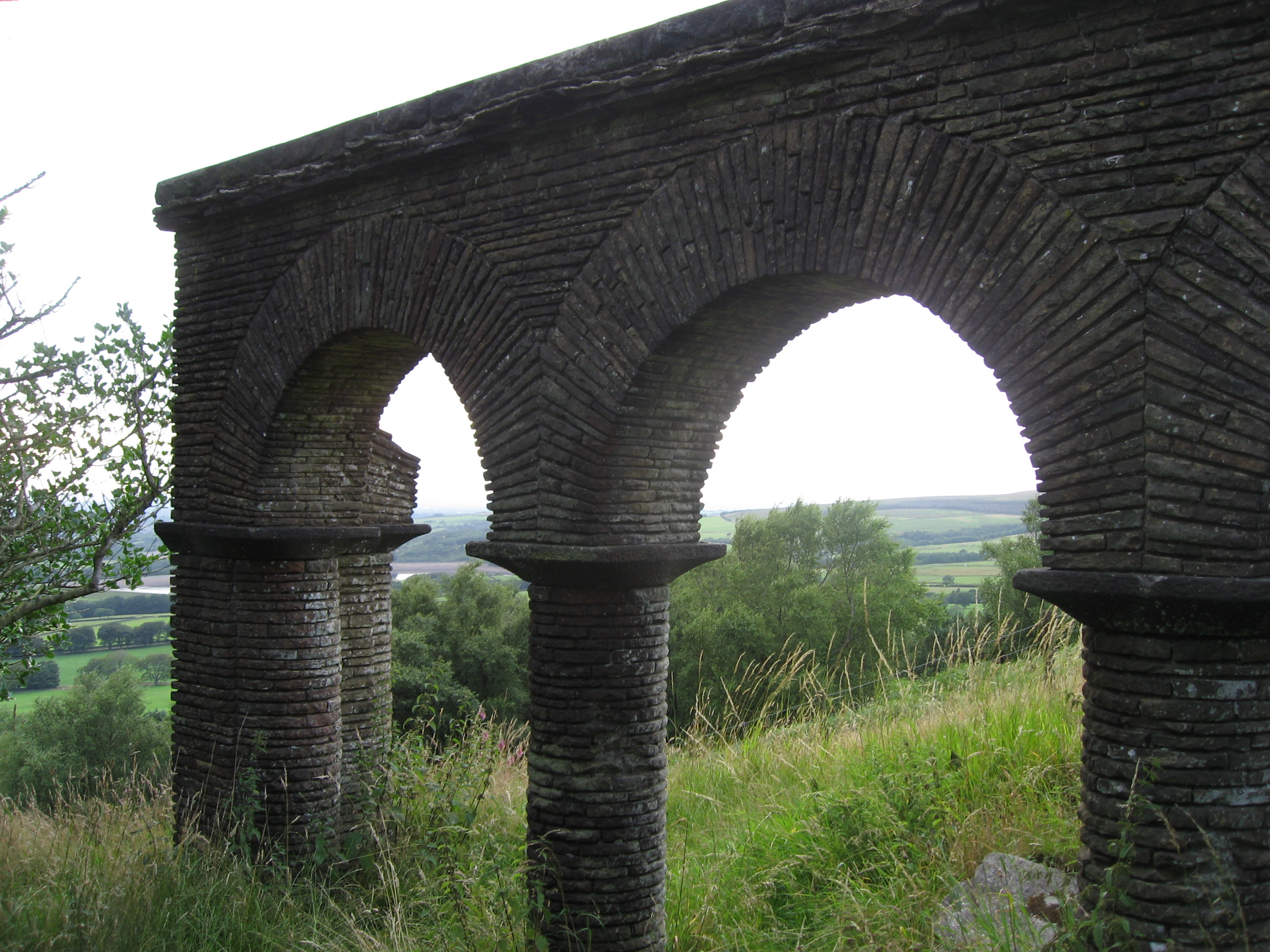
Remains of Terrace near Pigeon Tower

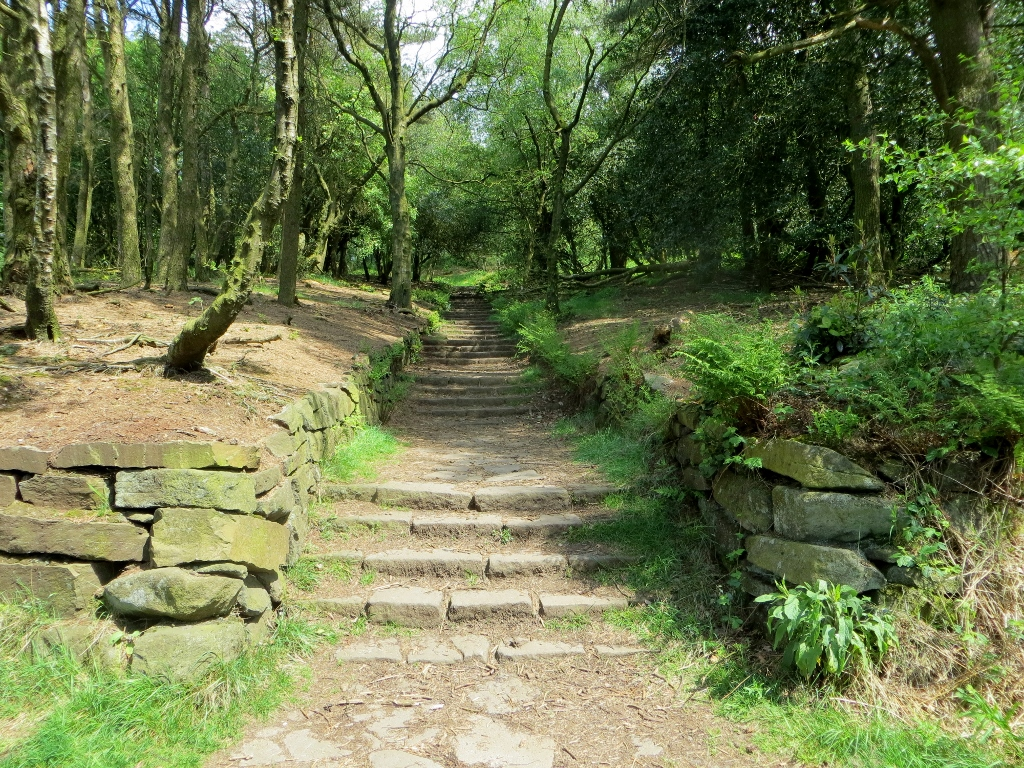
York Stone steps and Rockery

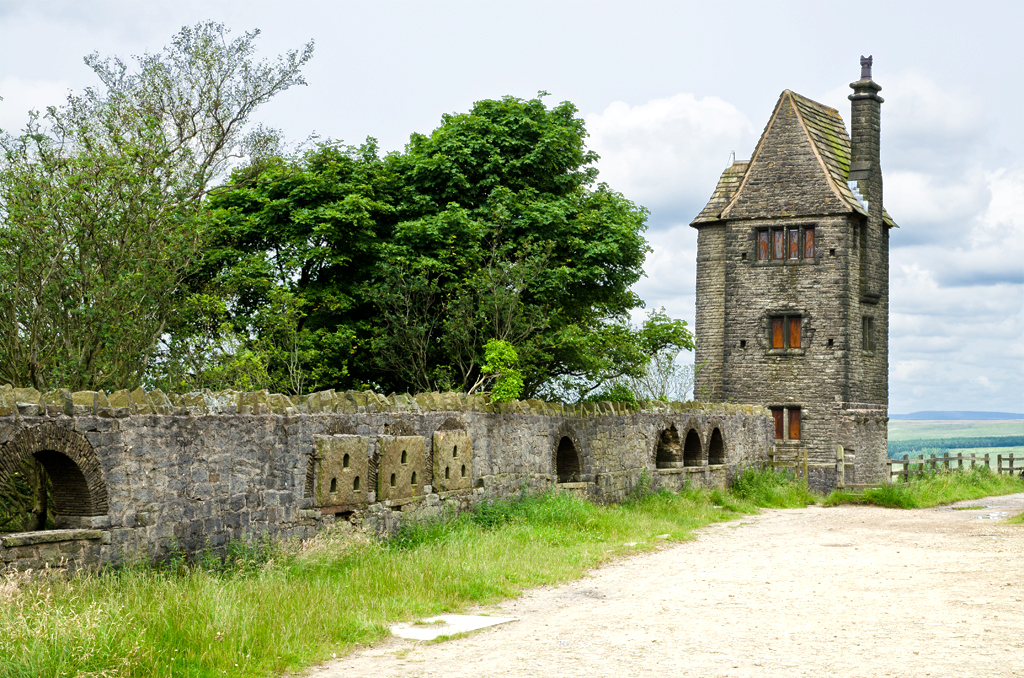
Pigeon Tower, view from Belmont Rd

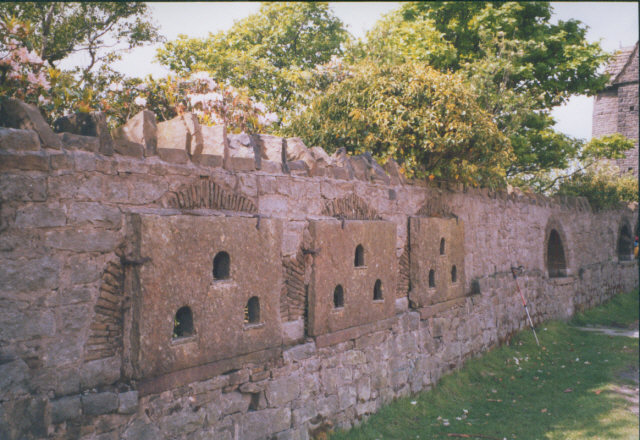
Dove Cote Wall, view from Belmont Rd.

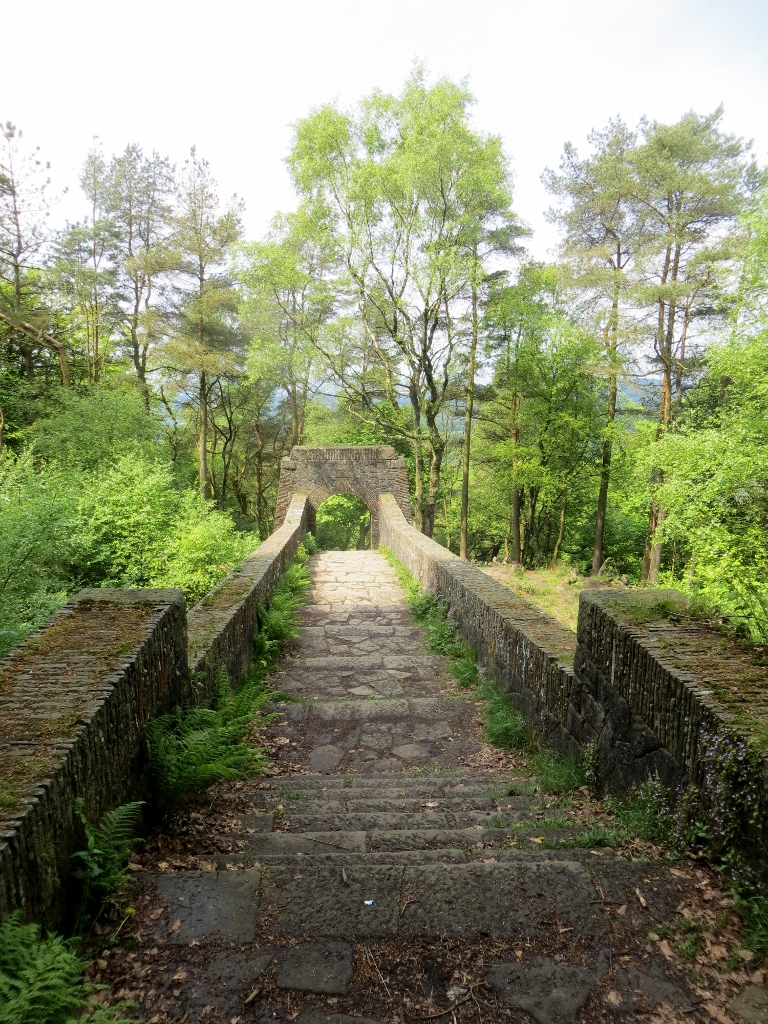
Seven Arched Bridge

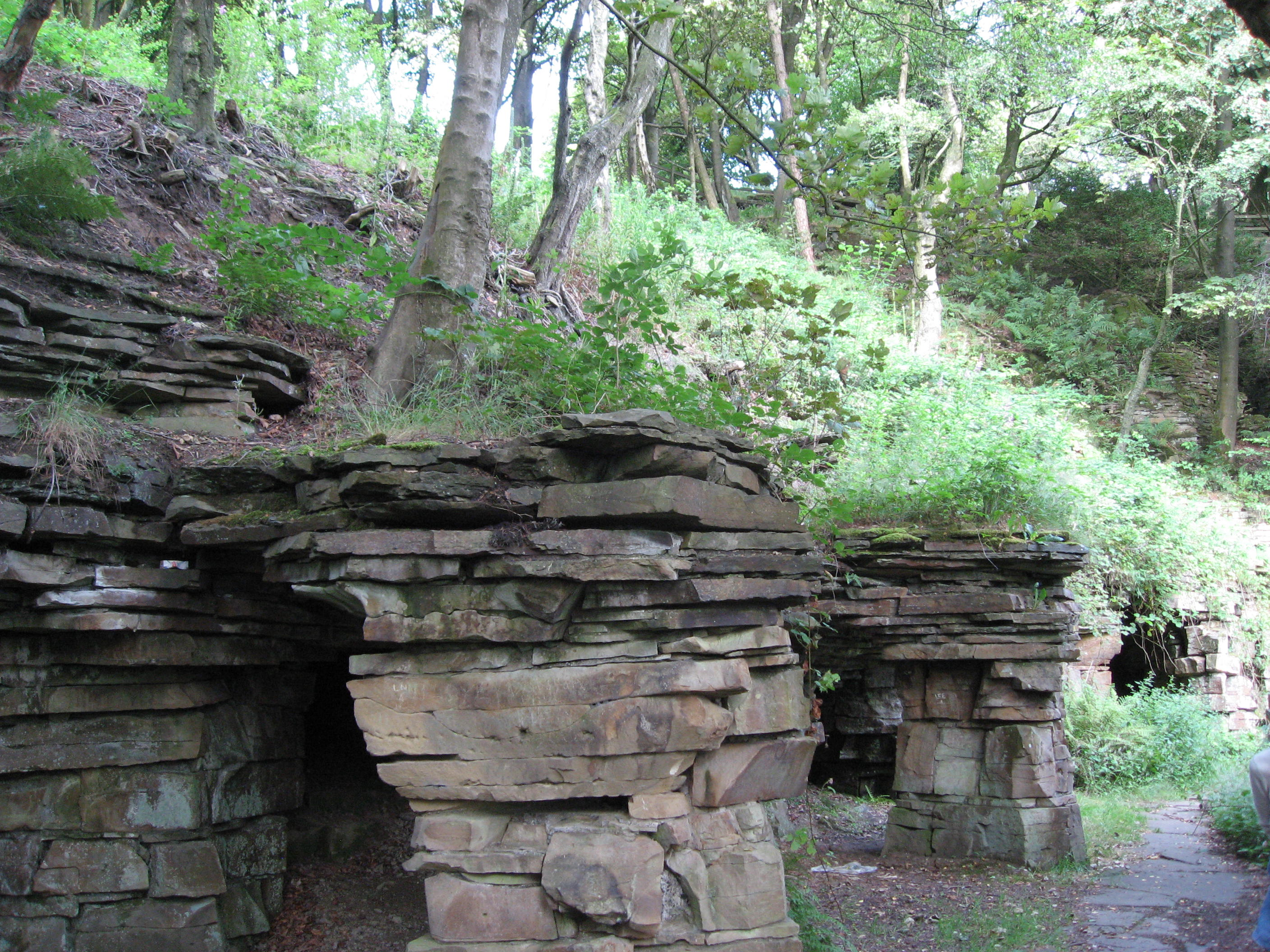
Man made Pulhamite Caves at the Ravine

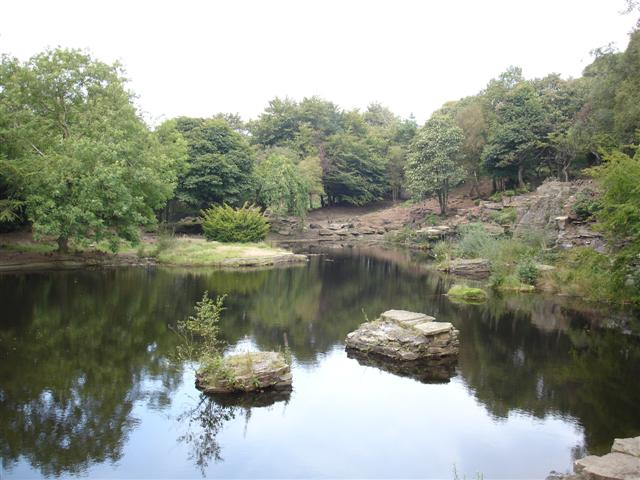
Man Made Pulhamite Former Japanese Style Lake

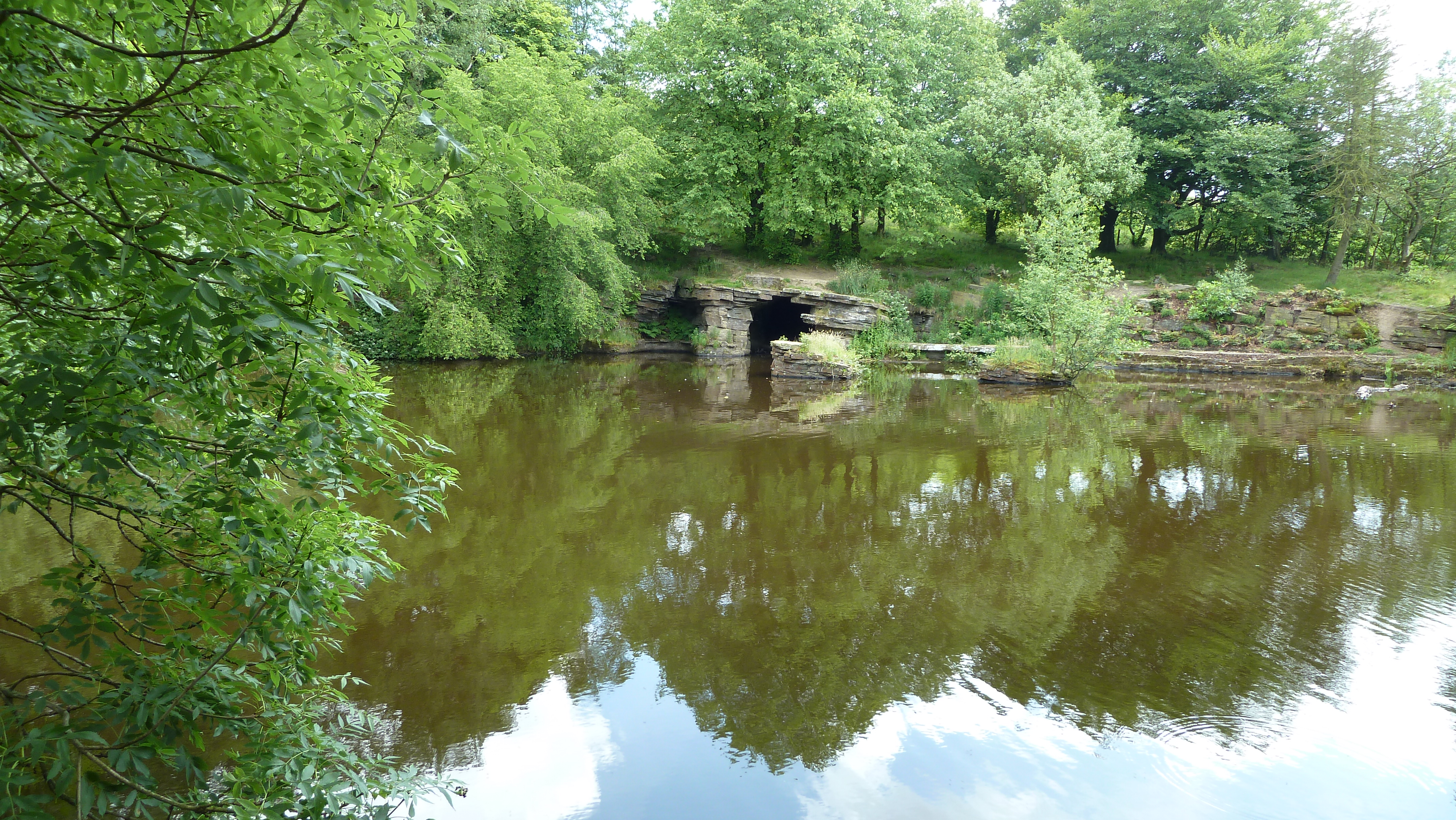
Man Made Pulhamite Caves At Former Japanese Lake

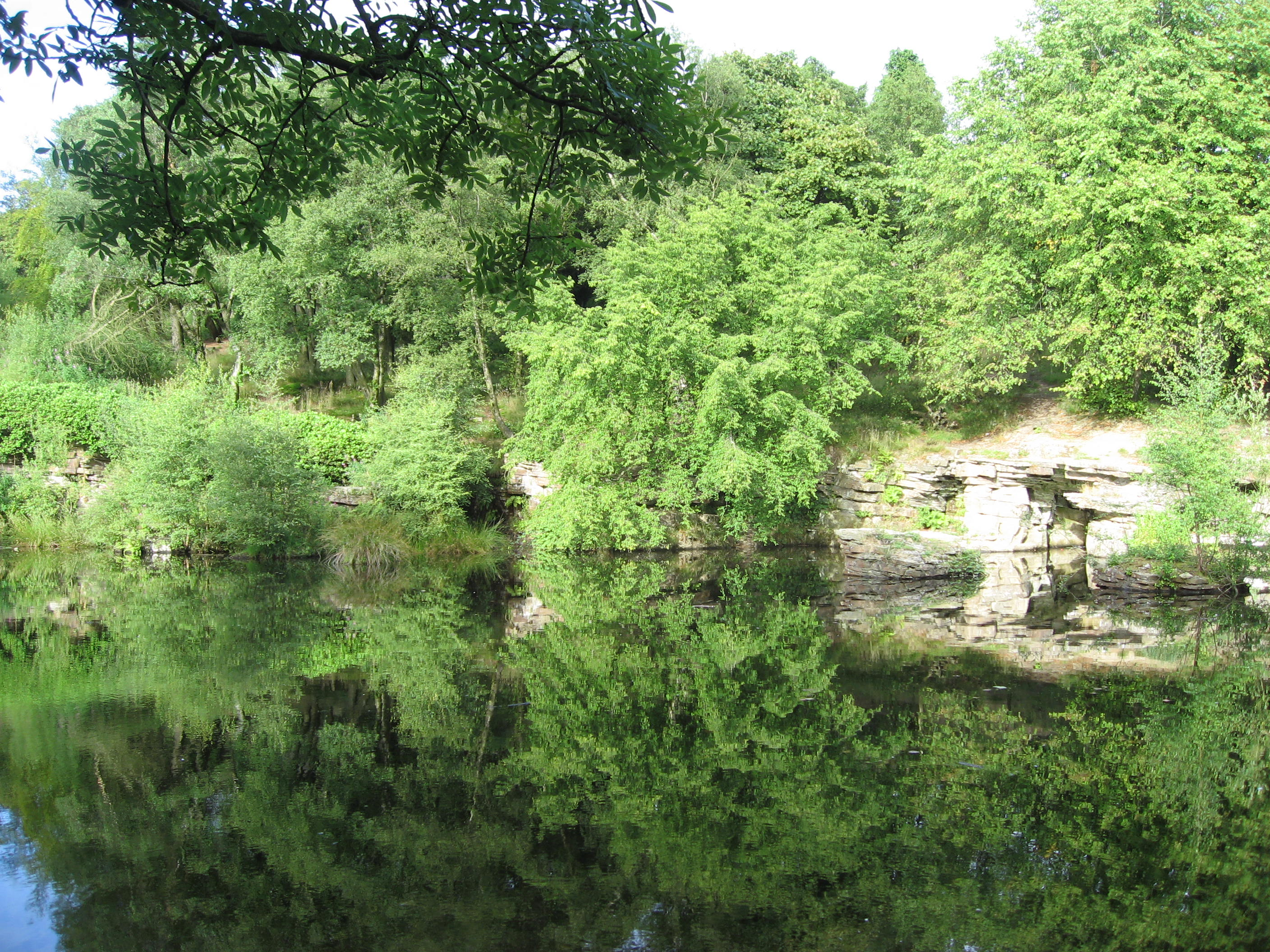
Leverhulme's Terraced Gardens at Rivington

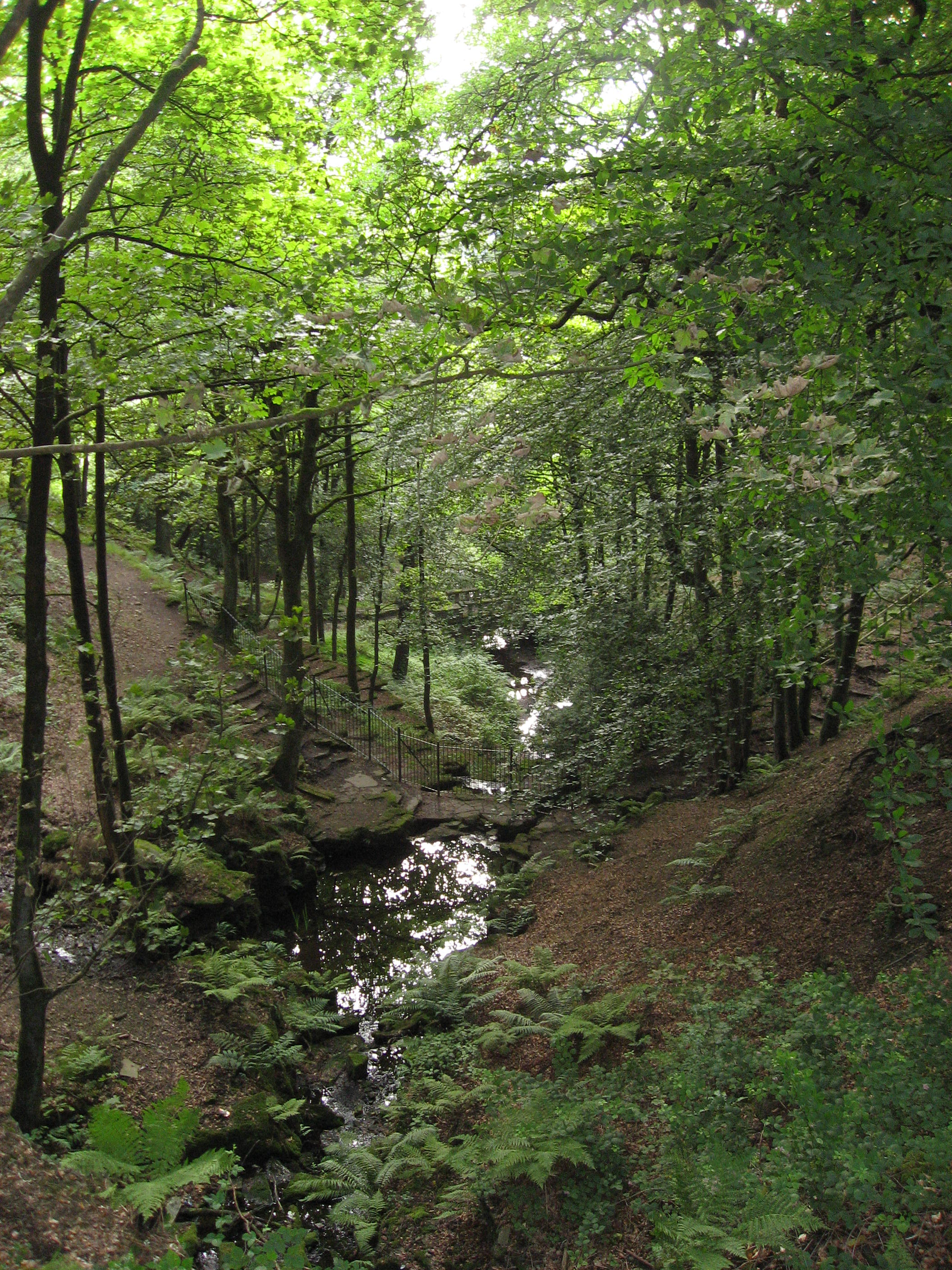
Leverhulme's Terraced Gardens at Rivington

== Gallery Historical ==
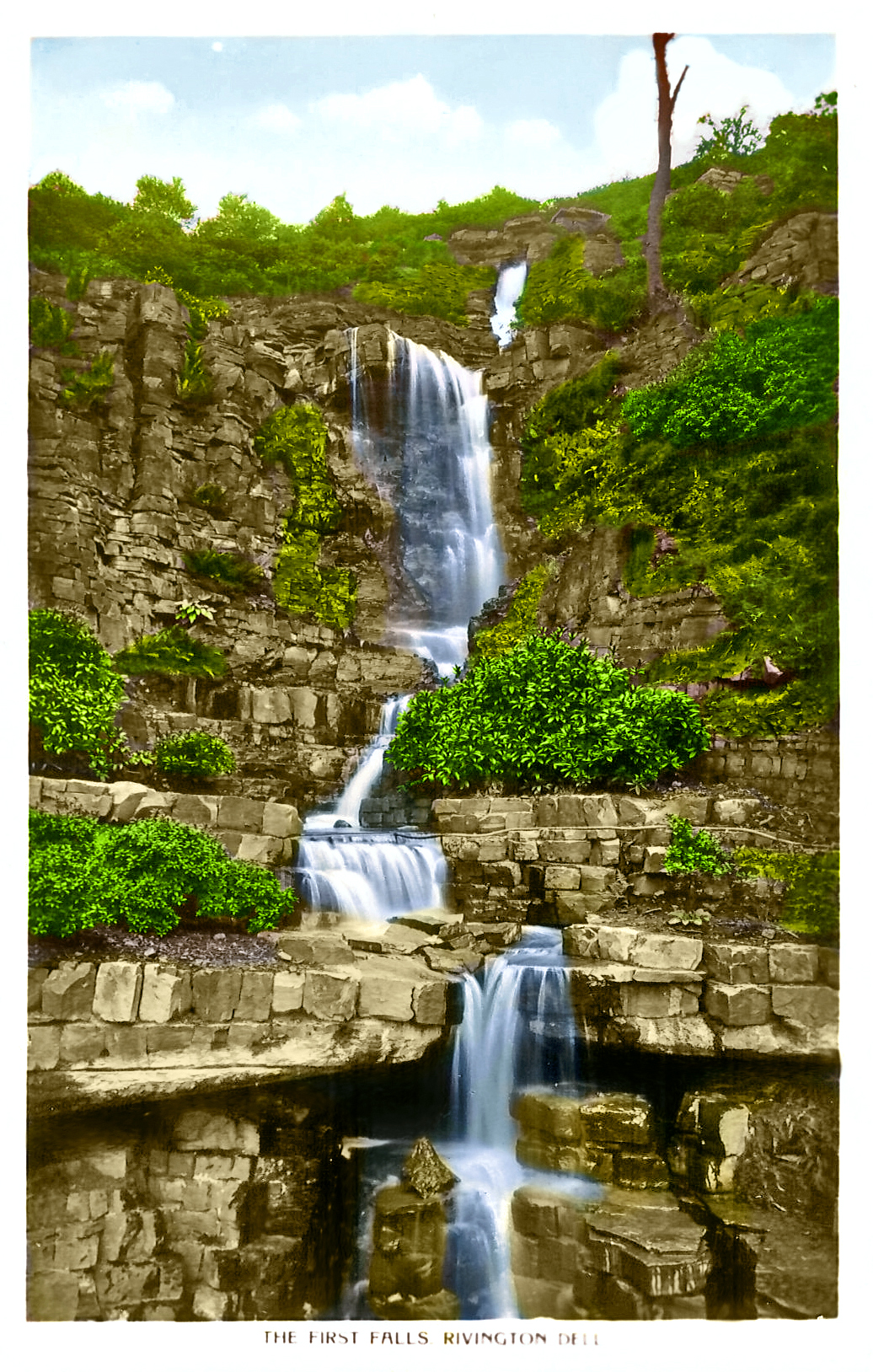
Rivington Dell

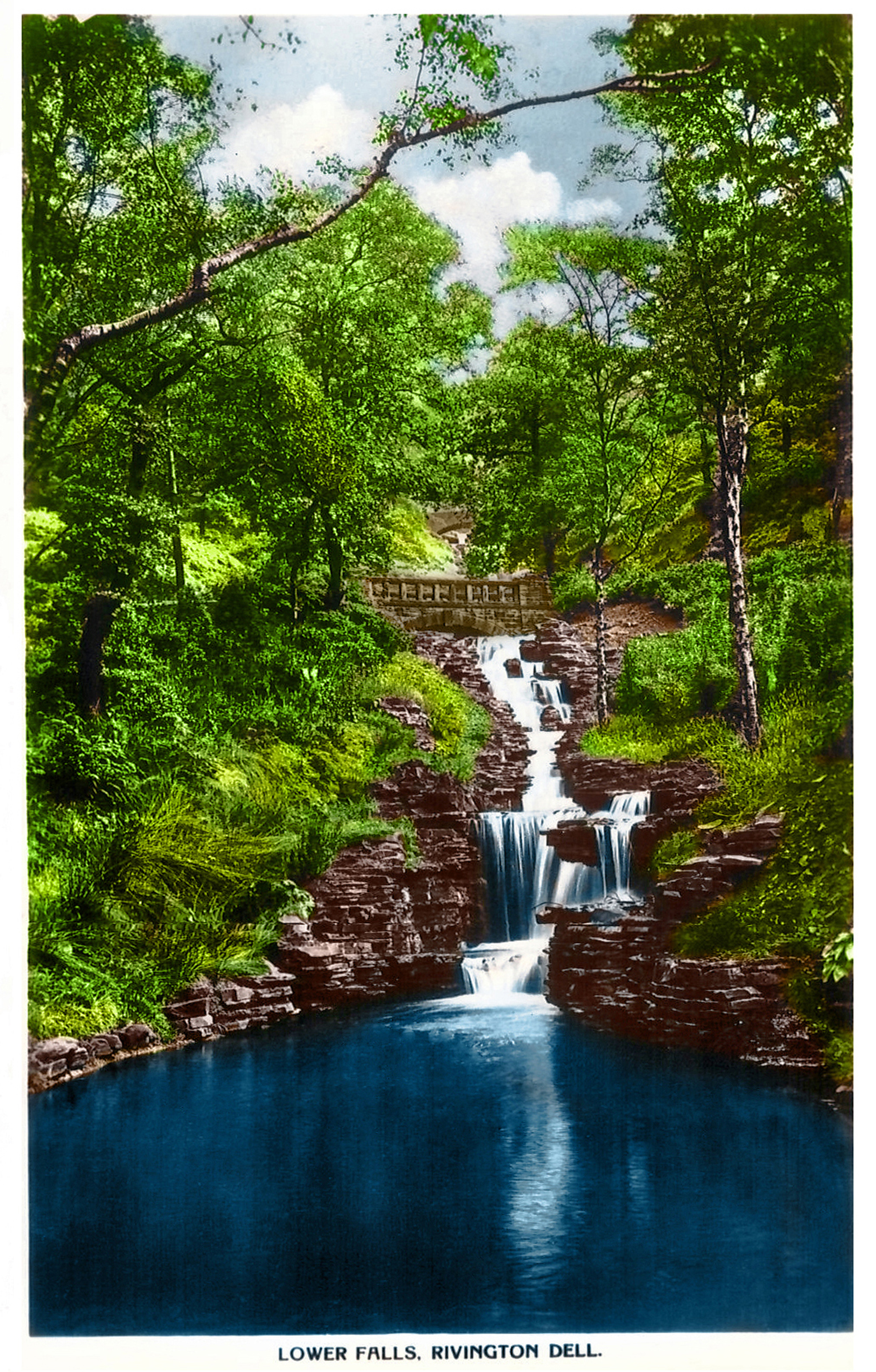
Gardens at Rivington Dell

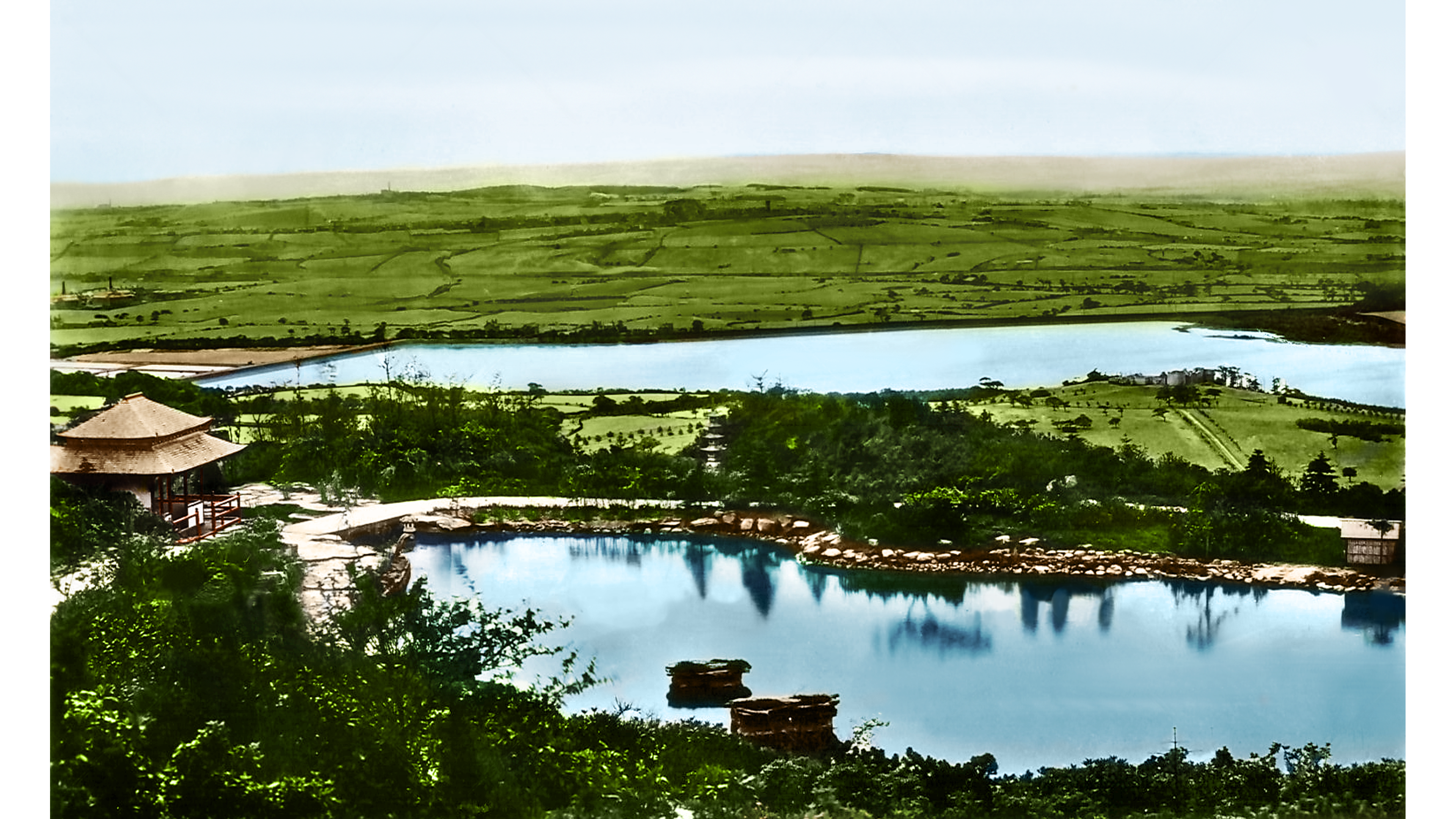
Bungalow Grounds with Lower Rivington Reservoirs in distance c.1925

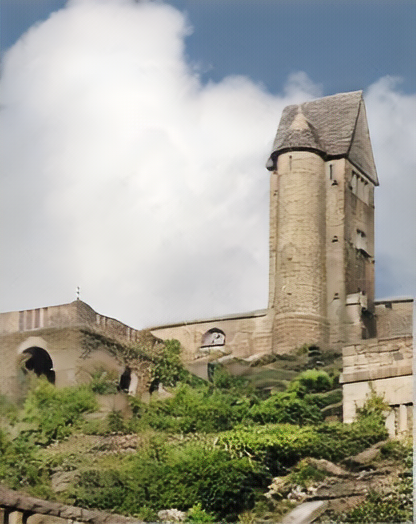
Pigeon Tower c 1920 digitally colourised

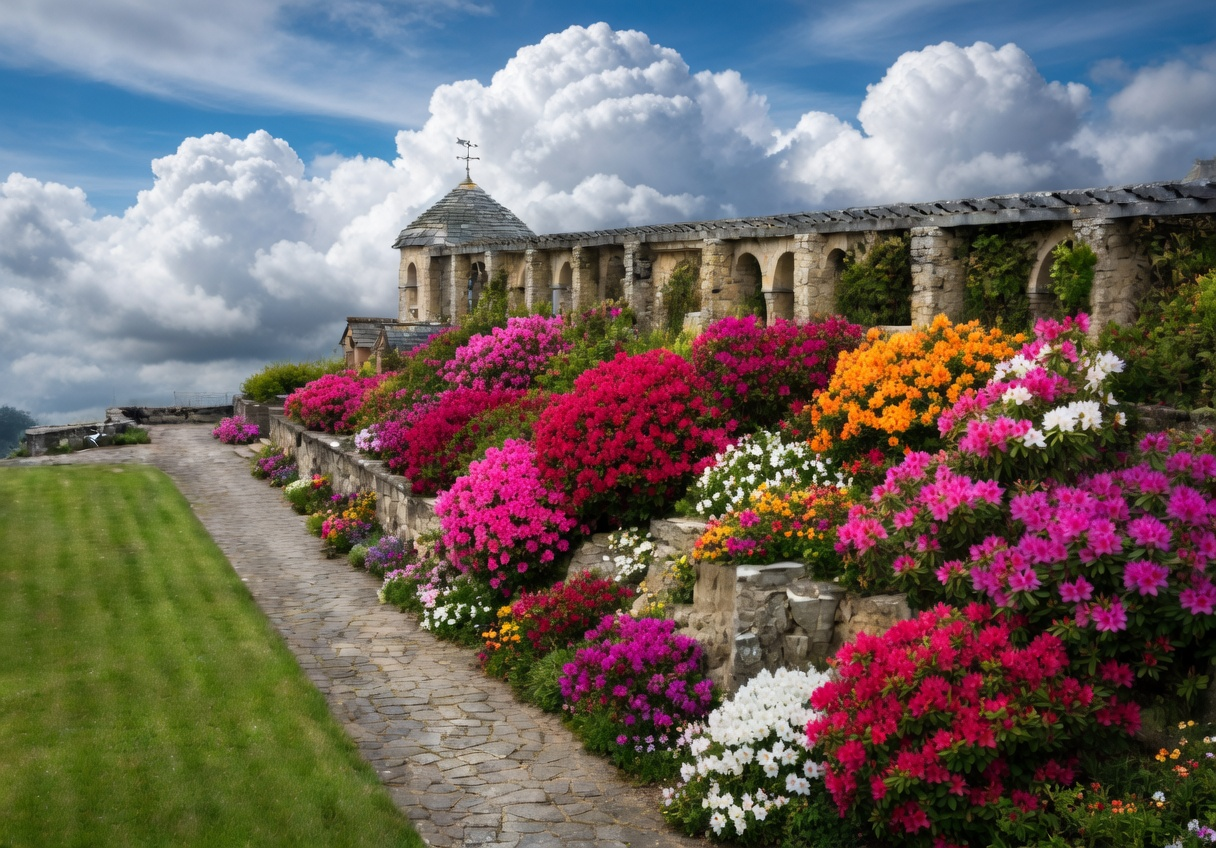
Leverhulmes Garden Second Bungalow c 1920 recreated 2026

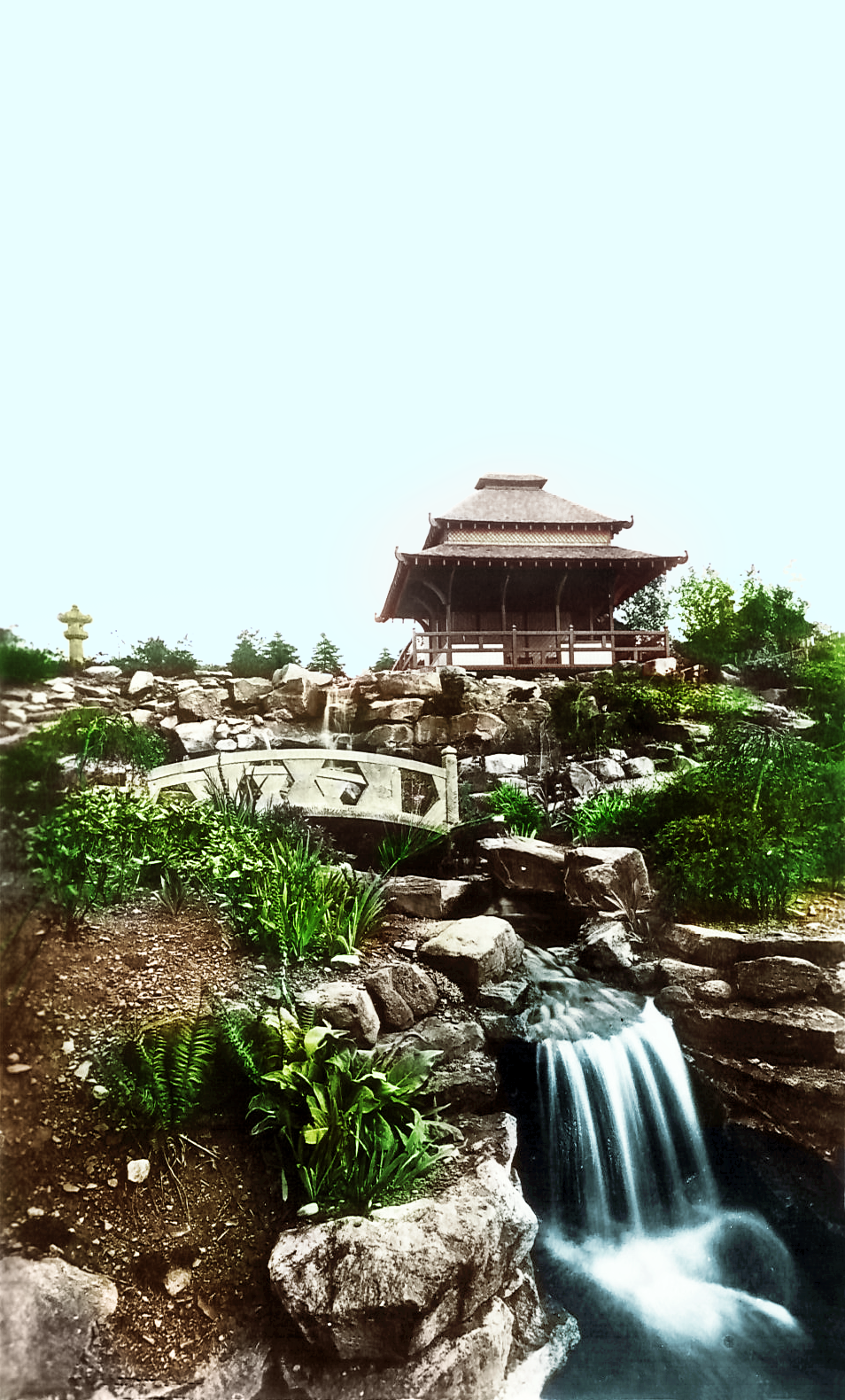
Japanese Garden Rivington

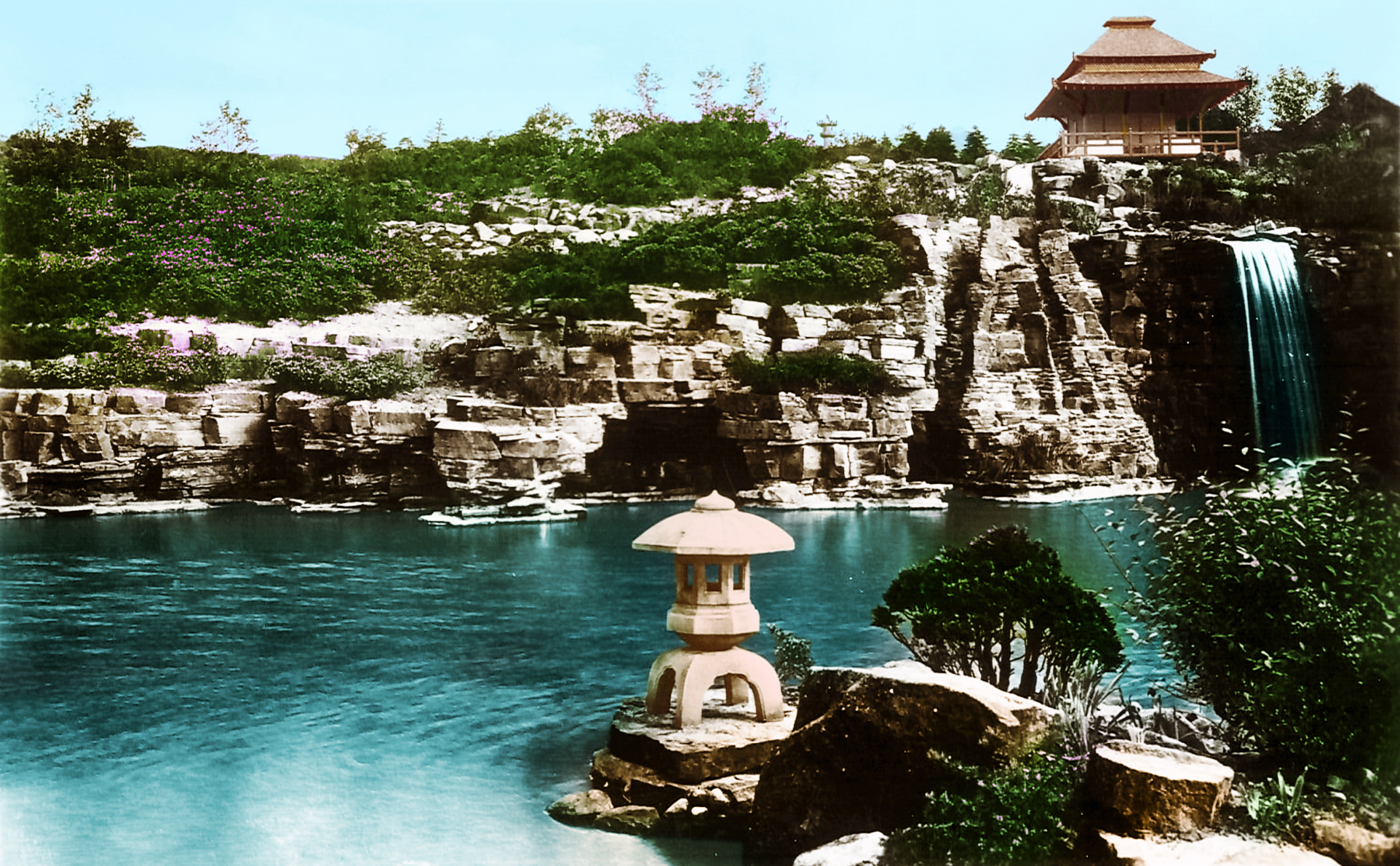
Japanese Garden Rivington

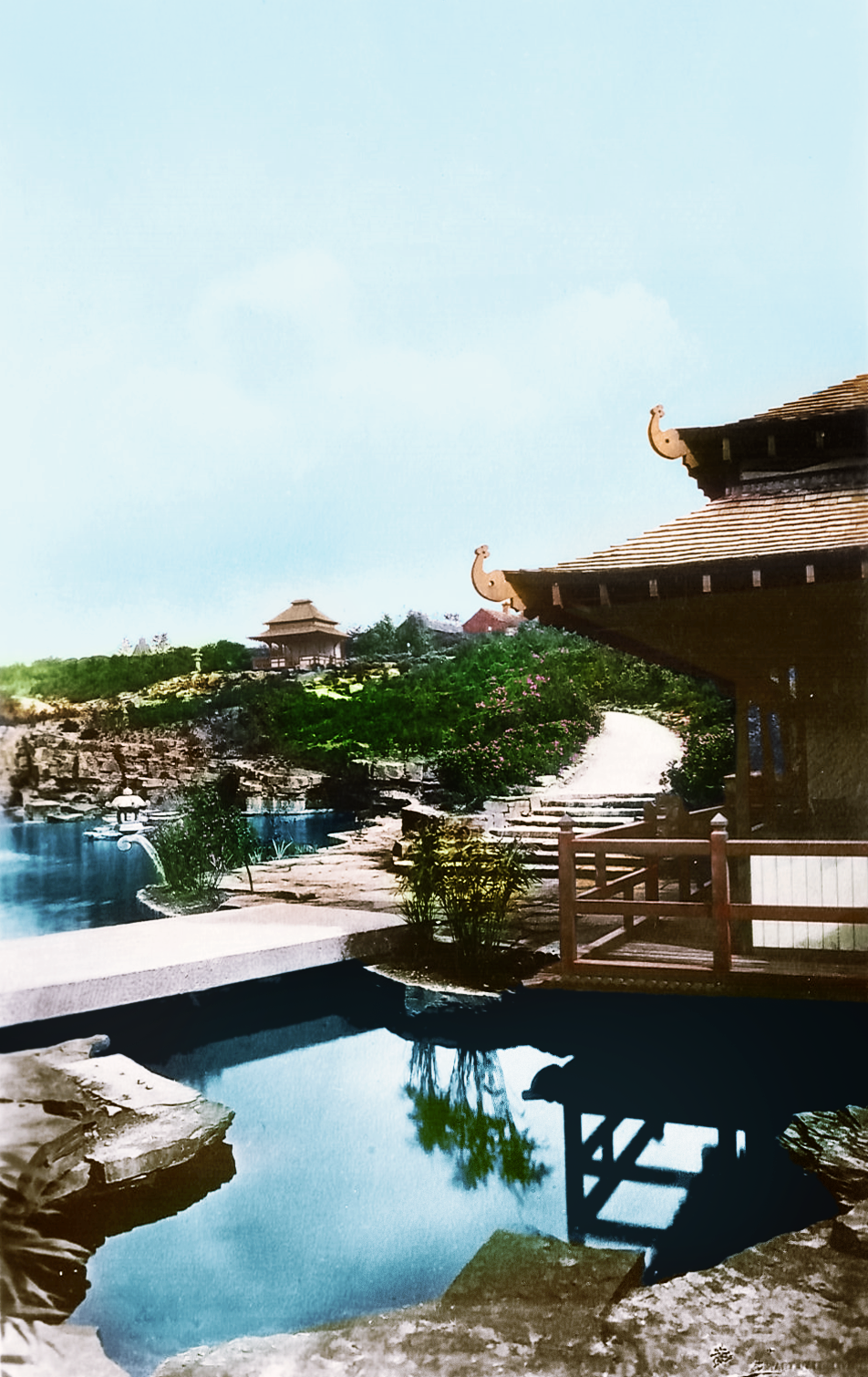
Japanese Garden, Rivington

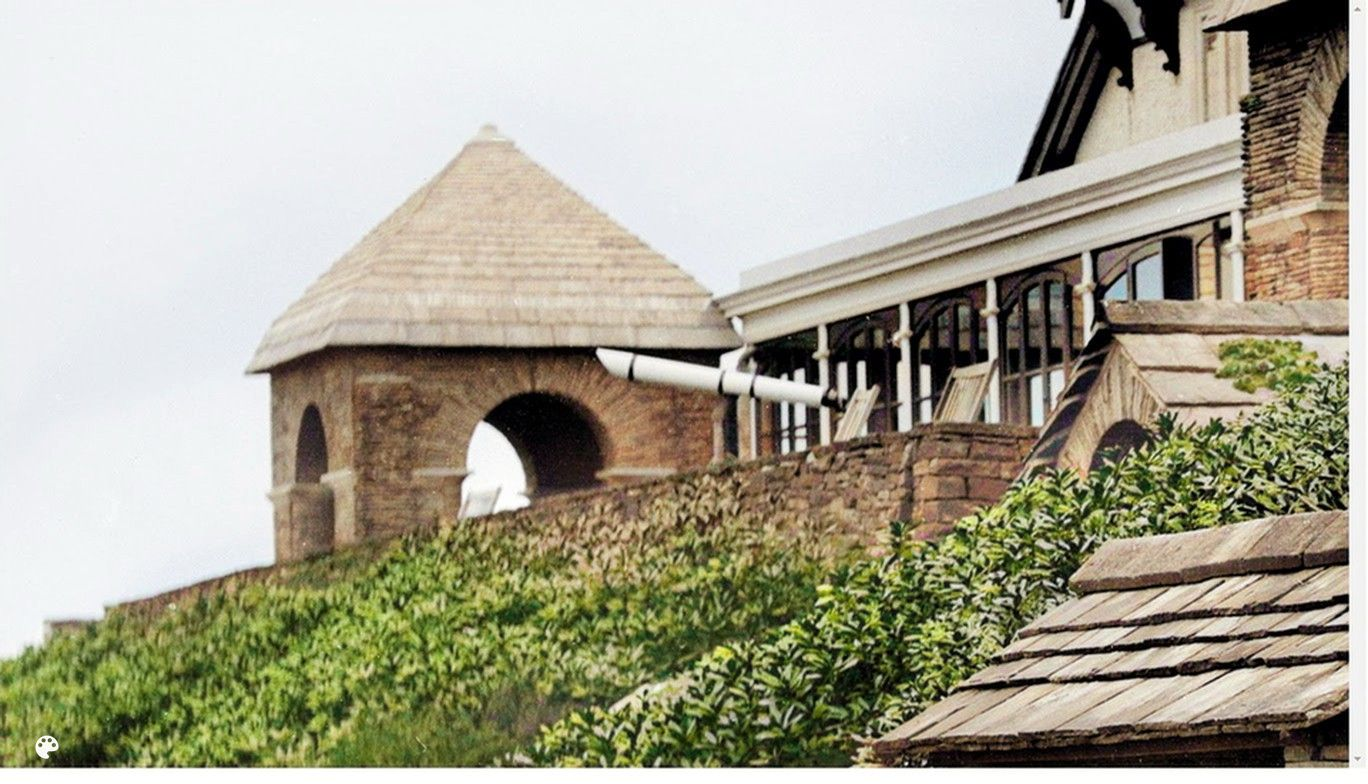
Roynton Cottage Balcony with Telescope Rivington, c. 1910,

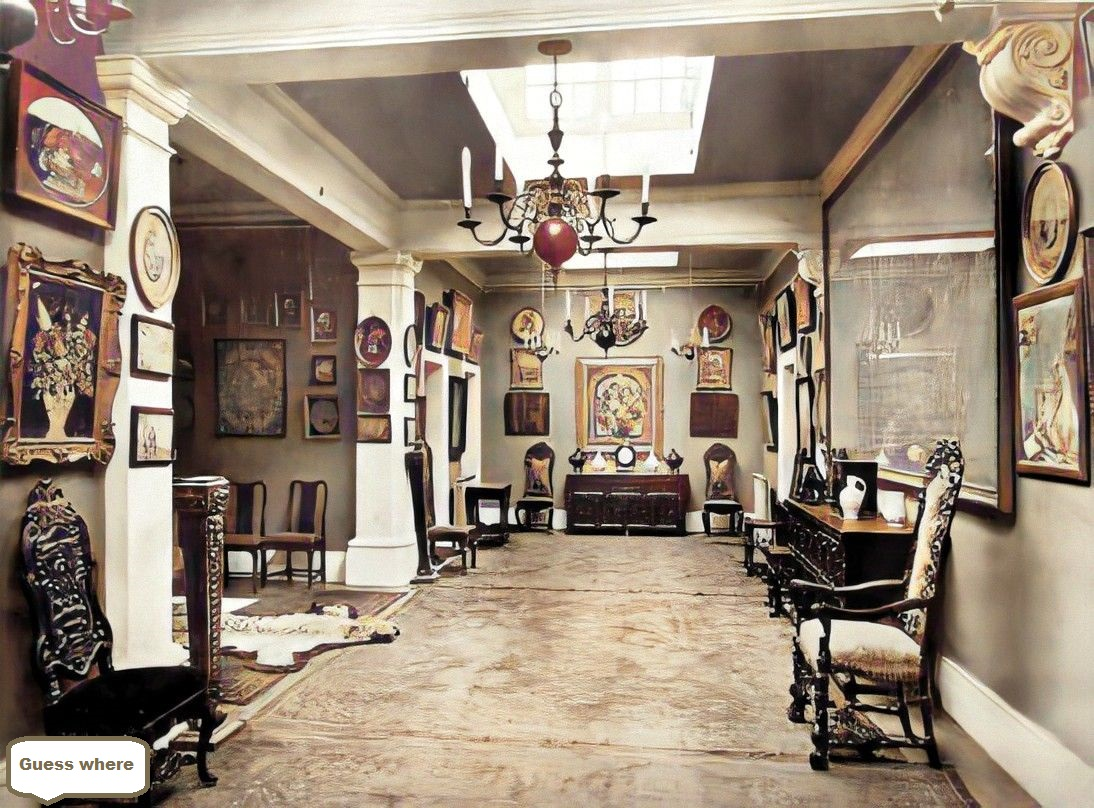
Leverhulme's Bungalow Interior Rivington, c. 1925.

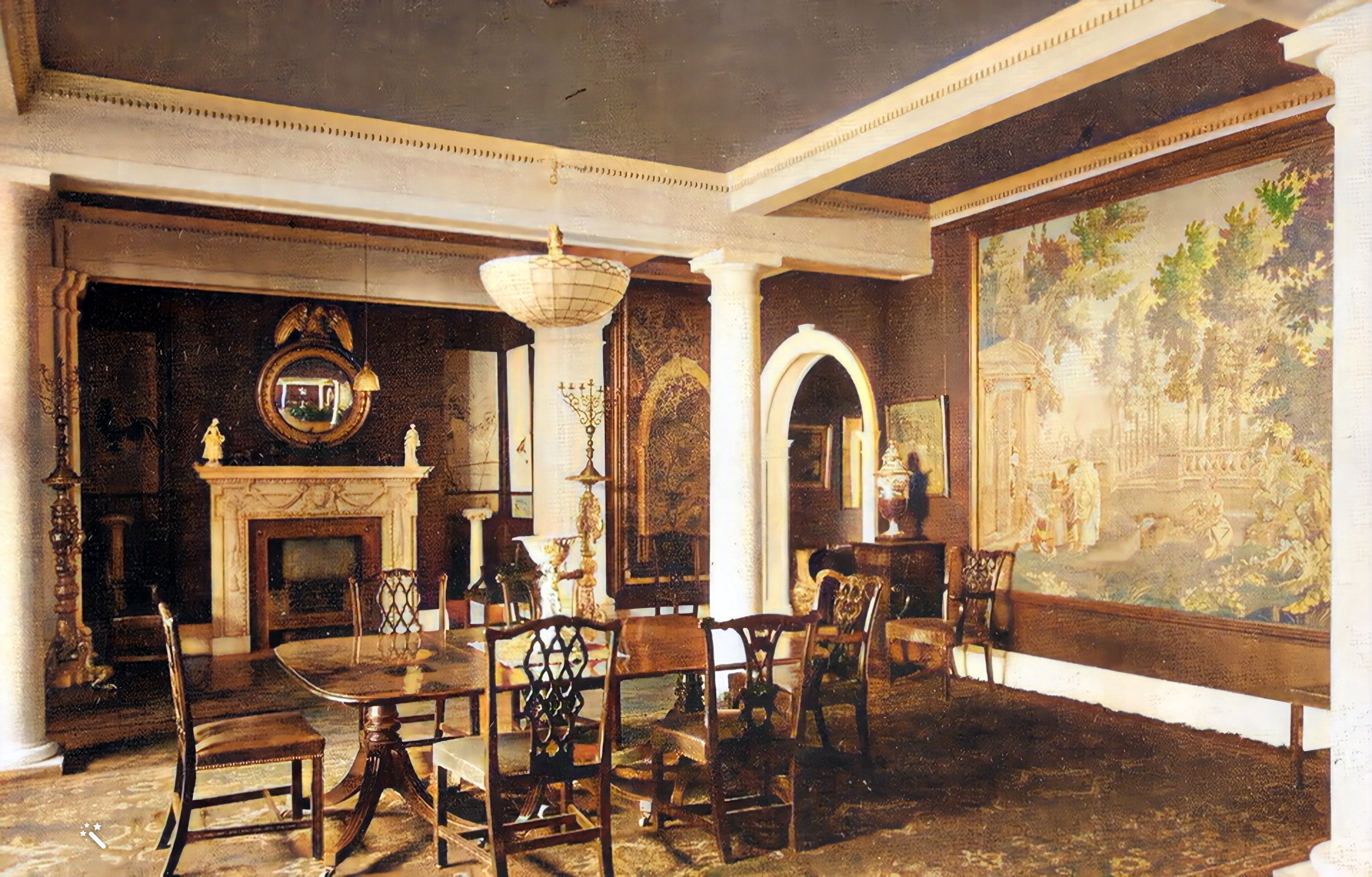
Dining Room Leverhulmes Bungalow c. 1925

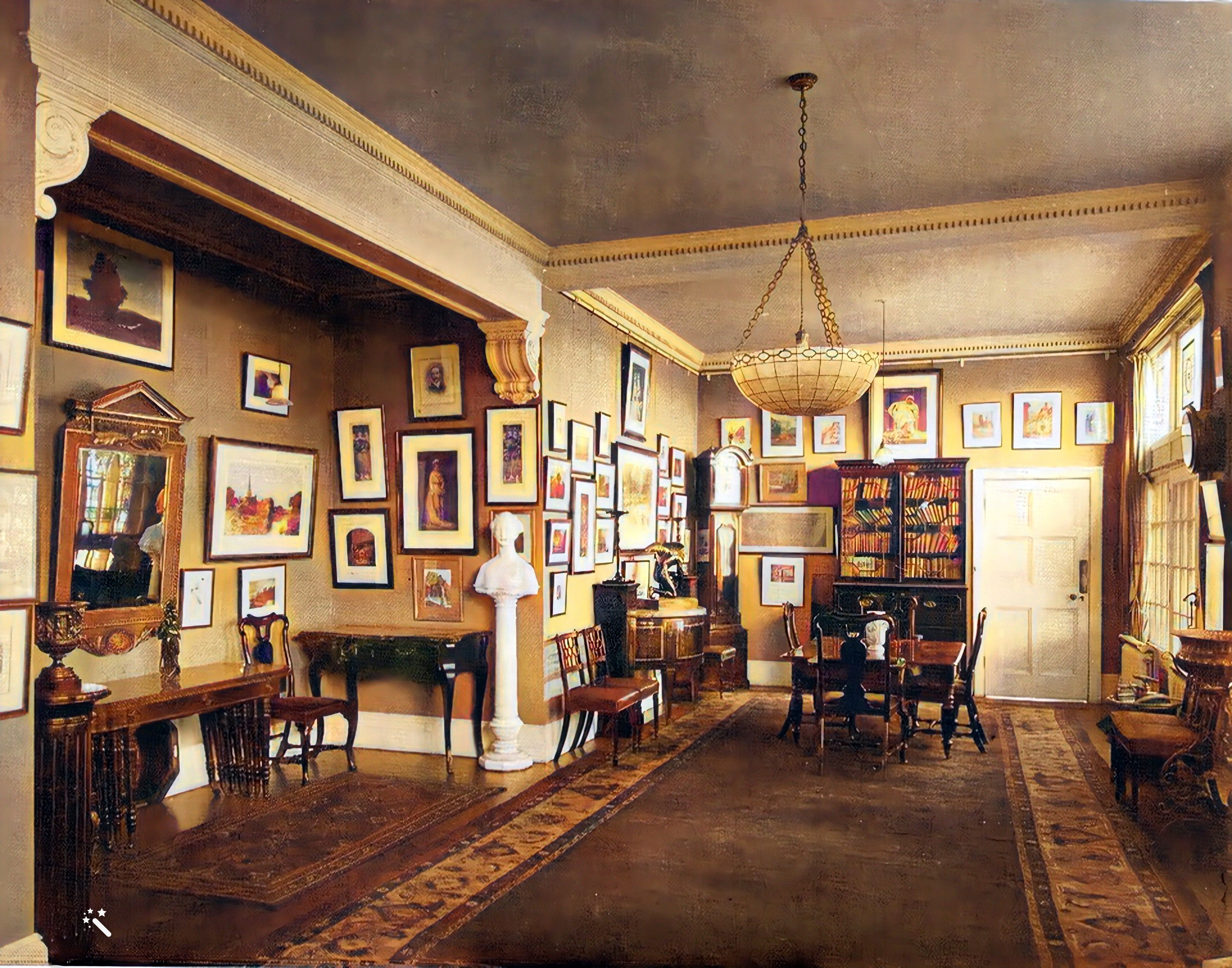
Morning Room Bungalow c. 1925

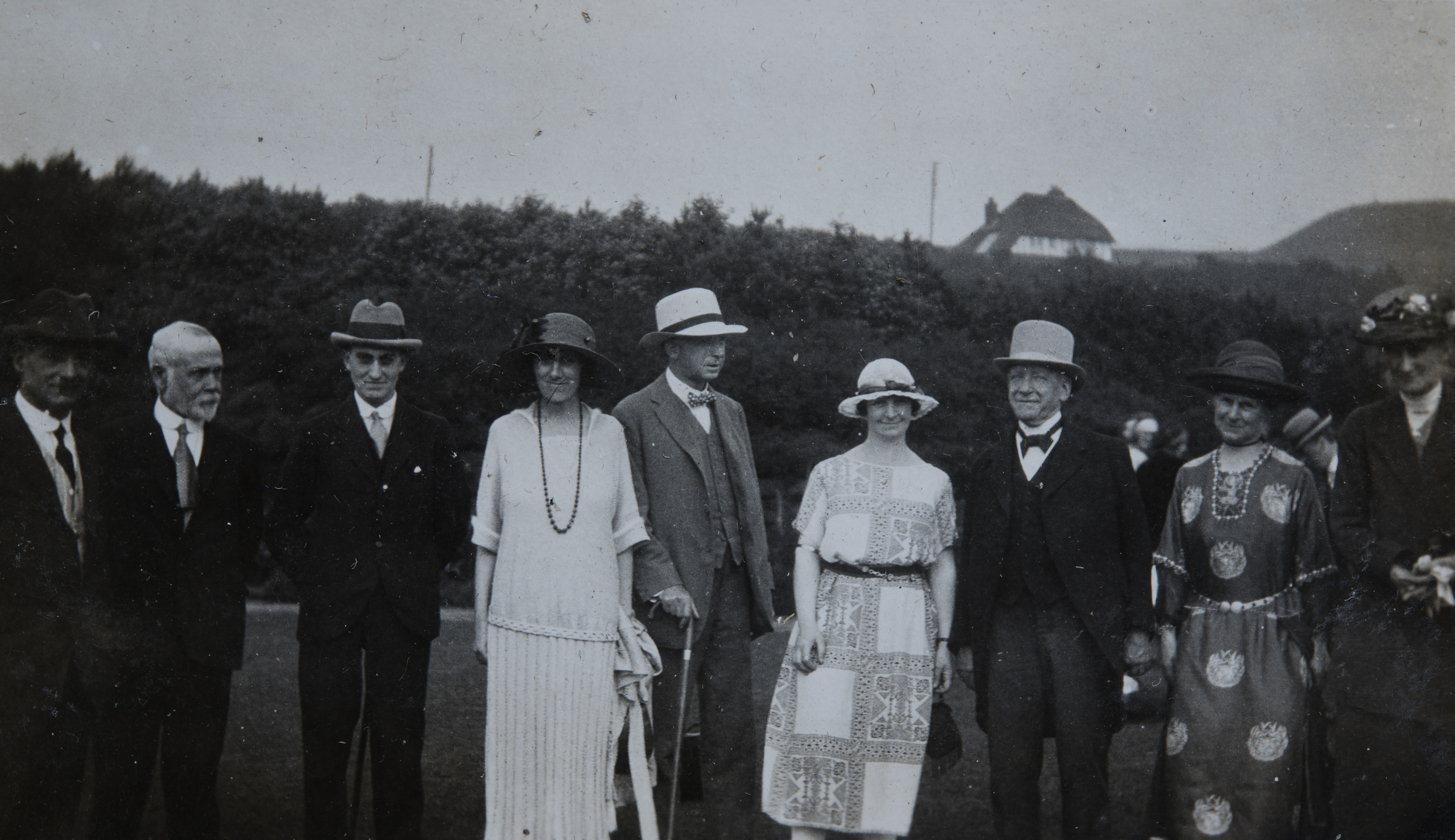
Lord Leverhume with TH Mawson at Rivington c. 1912
