= Children's Food Trust =

UK charity

- Formation: 2005
- Dissolved: 2017
- Legal status: Charity
- Purpose: Works with childcare providers, schools, local authorities, community organisations and industry to improve the food that children eat
- Location: 3rd Floor, 1 East Parade Sheffield, UK
- Region served: UK
- Chair: Adam Starkey, Linda Cregan
- Main organ: Board

The Children's Food Trust (formerly known as the School Food Trust, renamed in 2012) was a charity in the United Kingdom that sought to promote healthy eating for children.

== History ==
The Trust - originally named the School Food Trust - was created as a non-departmental public body (NDPB) in 2005 by the Department for Education and Skills (DfES), following celebrity chef Jamie Oliver's critique of the nutritional quality of school meals in his TV documentary Jamie's School Dinners and the recommendations of the School Meals Review Panel. Before 2005, Childhood obesity was a growing problem in the UK and it had been found that standards of school meals in England were low, with the average ingredient spent per meal at secondary schools being around 40p.

Suzi Leather was appointed as Chair of the Trust and Judy Hargadon, an NHS senior manager, was appointed as the Trust's first Chief Executive. Leather resigned in 2006 to become Chair of the Charity Commission and, in November of that year, Prue Leith was named as the Chair. She retired in January 2010. Hargadon retired in 2013 and was succeeded by Linda Cregan.

In April 2007, the Trust also became a registered charity. In October 2011, the Trust officially ceased to be an NDPB, expanding its work both as a charity and by trading its services through a new community interest company, the Children's Food Trust.

In July 2017, the charity's closure was announced due to running out of funding and the charity was officially closed on 30 September 2017.

== Funding ==
The trust was initially funded by a £15 million grant from the Department for Education and Skills and had been awarded in partnership with several organizations, including The Prince's Trust, Business in the Community, Magic Outcomes, and the Improvement Foundation. The Trust has also received an additional £20 million funding from the Big Lottery Fund for a network of school children's cookery clubs called Let's Get Cooking.
