= Geraldine Peacock =

Geraldine Peacock CBE was the first chair of the Charity Commission.

== Career ==
Geraldine was appointed Chief Charity Commissioner and the Charity Commission's first Chair-designate in 2004, with the remit of making the Commission 'fit for purpose' to implement the new Charities Act (which, among other things, replaced the role of Chief Charity Commissioner with those of Chair and Chief Executive). She left the Commission in July 2006, having laid firm foundations for the Charities Bill and with the Commission charged and invigorated to implement it.

Before joining the Charity Commission Geraldine was CEO of two major charities, Guide Dogs for the Blind and the National Autistic Society, and Chair of ACEVO (Association of Chief Executives of Voluntary Organisations), Futurebuilders and Groundbreakers.

Geraldine is on the board of Social Finance, a patron of Autism Speaks, the Rainbow Trust Children's Charity and the Community Development Finance Association (CDFA).

Geraldine sits on the Board for Social Enterprise at Harvard Business School, where she lectures on the MBA programme. She is an associate fellow at the Skoll Centre for Social Entrepreneurship, sits on the Said Business School Board at Oxford, and is also a visiting fellow at the Centre for Charity Effectiveness, Cass Business School, London.

== Awards ==
The Charity Awards 2002, winner of the Outstanding Achievement Award.

Non-profit organization positions
Preceded by John Stoker	Chief Charity Commissioner and Chair of the Charity Commission; 2004–2006	Succeeded by Suzi Leather
