= Social Investment Business =

British charity and trading company

- Abbreviation: SIB
- Formation: 2002; 24 years ago (Adventure Capital Fund) 2009 (Social Investment Business)
- Legal status: Registered charity
- Purpose: Providing loans, grants, investment products for social enterprises and third sector organisations
- Headquarters: London, United Kingdom
- Location: Canopi, Arc House, 82 Tanner Street, London, SE1 3GN
- Region served: United Kingdom
- Chief Executive: Nick Temple
- Parent organization: Social Investment Business Foundation
- Website: www.sibgroup.org.uk

Social Investment Business (SIB) is a UK registered charity and trading company that offers loans, grants and other financial products to charities and social enterprises.

SIB is one of the largest and oldest social investors in the UK. Its foundation pioneered community investment in the UK and, to date, has deployed and managed over £0.75bn of loans and grants, directly supporting more than 5,000 charities and social enterprises.

== History ==
Social Investment Business began as the Adventure Capital Fund (ACF), a partnership of several social sector organisations. The initial £2m fund was created by the UK Government to work out how to create sustainable community enterprises through social investment.

After obtaining charitable status and taking on the management of several other funds the Social Investment Business Group was formed in 2009, bringing together ACF as parent charity alongside Social Investment Business as the fund manager social enterprise.

In 2011, the Communitybuilders Fund was transferred to the group as a permanent endowment to continue supporting local community projects. Three years later, ACF was renamed the Social Investment Business Foundation, uniting the brand as it is today.

In 2025, Social Investment Business launched a new 5-year strategy, focusing their work as a social investor across three priorities: Green Transition, Infrastructure and Public Services.

== Activities ==
Since 2002, Social Investment Business has deployed and managed over £750m of loans and grants, directly supporting over 5,000 social sector organisations. Their mission is to support the social economy to build a stronger and fairer society, and do so through three areas of work: funding, flexible support to investees, as well as research and advocacy to influence government policy and support the social economy.

The UK government selected SIB to deliver phase 2 of the Youth Investment Fund in 2022, a fund worth over £300 million designed to improve and develop youth services in some of the most underserved communities around England. As of 2025 all funding has been disbursed.

In 2025, SIB launched a new 5-year strategy, bringing fresh focus to their work as a social investor and defining three priority areas critical to supporting the social sector into the future: Green Transition, Infrastructure and Public Services.

== Funds managed ==
  - 2002 The Adventure Capital Fund (ACF) is launched.
  - 2003 The first investment from the ACF is made – in Action for Business Bradford (£300,000).
  - 2006 ACF becomes a registered charity in its own right – the Adventure Capital Fund.
  - 2007 Moss Side and Hulme Community Development Trust are the first organisation to repay an ACF loan in full.
  - 2008 ACF starts managing the Futurebuilders Fund. Futurebuilders had originally been set up in 2004 by the Cabinet Office as a £125m investment fund to help third sector organisations in England bid for, win and deliver public service contracts.
  - 2009 The £100m Social Enterprise Investment Fund is launched. It is managed on behalf of the UK Department of Health to enhance the role of social enterprise in the provision of health and social care
  - 2009 The £70m Communitybuilders Fund is launched. ACF led a consortium to manage the fund on behalf of the Department for Communities and Local Government. The fund supported neighbourhood-based, community-led organisations to become more sustainable through a mixture of loans, grants and business support.
  - 2009 The Social Investment Business Group is created. The group consisted of parent charity, the ACF, and fund manager social enterprise, the Social Investment Business.
  - 2011 The Communitybuilders Fund is transferred to the group as a permanent endowment that could continue to support local community projects.
  - 2012 The three year Investment and Contract Readiness Fund is launched. Funded by the Cabinet Office, SIB manage this programme to help charities and social enterprises raise investment or win contracts.
  - 2013 Launch of partnership with Social and Sustainable Capital, an FCA regulated Fund Manager.
  - 2014 The Big Potential fund is launched. SIB manage this Big Lottery funded investment readiness programme that aims to improve the sustainability, capacity and scale of charities and social enterprises so they can deliver greater social impact
  - 2016 The Reach Fund is set up to help organisations raise further investment through grants funded by Access – the Foundation for Social Investment
  - 2017 Impact Management Programme is run by Social Investment Business, distributing £1.8m and backed by Access – the Foundation for Social Investment
  - 2018 The Forward Enterprise Fund is formed with Better Society Capital, Access and the National Lottery Community Fund as investors, delivered by Social Investment Business
  - 2018 The Enterprise Development Programme is launched, a five year programme funded by Access – the Foundation for Social Investment
  - 2020 Resilience and Recovery Loan Fund is established as a result of COVID-19. Backed by the government’s Coronavirus Business Interruption Loan Scheme (CBILS)
  - 2021 Recovery Loan Fund is set up to support charities and social enterprises in Covid recovery. The Church of England’s social investment programme, Big Society Capital, MFS Investment Management and Treebeard Trust join founding investor the Fusion21 Foundation.
  - 2022 Social Investment Business, The Ubele Initiative, Create Equity and Access – the Foundation for Social Investment announce £2m of grant funding for Black and racially minoritised-led charities and social enterprises to use alongside the Recovery Loan Fund
  - 2022 The UK government selects Social Investment Business to deliver Phase 2 of the Youth Investment Fund worth over £300m to improve youth services around the country
  - 2023 Social Investment Business announce £6.6m of unrestricted funding to support growth of charities and social enterprises in Thrive Together Fund.
  - 2023 Social Investment Business designs the £4m Cost of Living Fund to provide grant funding alongside the Recovery Loan Fund for organisations affected by the cost of living crisis
  - 2024 The Cost of Living Fund closes with all grants distributed and 94% going to IMD 1-3 in England.
  - 2024 A new £15m Energy Resilience Fund is announced by Social Investment Business, a blended package (40% grant, 60% loan) for charities and social enterprises in England, Scotland and Wales
  - 2025 The £17m Community Builders Fund is launched delivered by Social Investment Business adding five new partners: Groundwork, Homeless Link, Co-operative and Community Finance, Fredericks Foundation, and The Architectural Heritage Fund.

== Recognition ==
In 2014, SIB won the Charity Times award category 'Social Investment Initiative' category.

In 2021 SIB won the Social Investment Deal of the Year at the UK Social Enterprise Awards, for their Resilience and Recovery Loan Fund (RRLF). Established within six weeks, RRLF made an existing government scheme (the Coronavirus Business Interruption Loan Scheme (CBILS) more easily accessible to charities and social enterprises.

In 2024, Nick Temple, Social Investment Business Chief Executive Officer, received an OBE for his commitment to the social enterprise sector, as part of the King’s Birthday Honours list.
