= Suzi Leather =

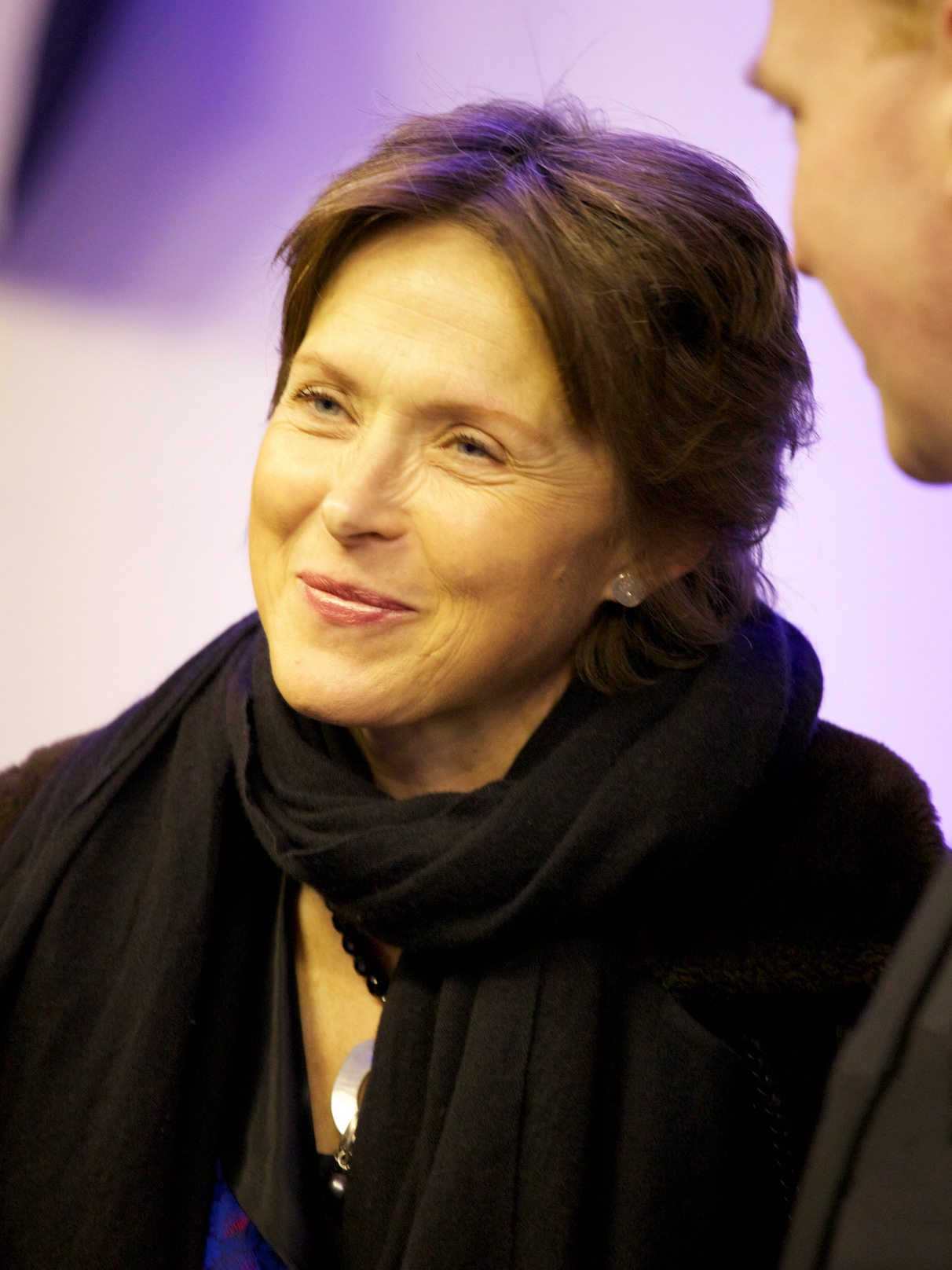
Leather in 2011

Dame Susan Catherine Leather, DBE, DL (born 5 April 1956), known as Suzi Leather, was chair of the Charity Commission from 1 August 2006 to 31 July 2012. She was succeeded by William Shawcross. Previously she chaired the Human Fertilisation and Embryology Authority. She was created a Dame Commander of the Order of the British Empire in January 2006.

She was appointed to 13 quango posts under the Blair Labour government, and was called the "quango queen" by parts of the press.

== Education ==
She was educated at St Mary's, Calne, Tavistock School, and Exeter University where she received a BA degree with honours in Politics in 1977, followed by a BPhil degree in social work. She then took an MA degree in European politics in 1978 from Leicester University.

== Career ==
From 1979 to 1984, she was a senior research officer for Consumers in Europe. From 1984 to 1986 she was a trainee probation officer. From 1988 to 1997, she was a freelance consumer consultant. From 1997 to 2001, she was chair of Exeter and District NHS trust. From 2000 to 2002, she was first deputy chair of the Food Standards Agency.

From March 2002 to July 2006, she was chair of Human Fertilisation and Embryology Authority. She joined the board of the United Kingdom Accreditation Service in 2006 (a political recommendation from the Downing Street office of then Prime Minister Tony Blair) to improve their quality standards regulation.

From May 2005 to July 2006, she was chair of the School Food Trust. She gave up the HFEA and School Food Trust positions for the Charity Commission position. She felt her qualification for that position derived from her experience as a regulator rather than any expertise with charities; "My main contact [with charities] has been through volunteering – I have no experience personally of working for charities. I don't think I had a very well developed sense of what the Charities Bill was going to do, so I can't describe myself as a charities expert in any sense", and therefore spent her early months in the post absorbing information about the sector.

Leather was dubbed the "quango queen" in the popular press.

In April 2013, she took the unpaid position of the independent Chair of the Plymouth Fairness Commission.

== Achievements ==
As Chair of Human Fertilisation and Embryology Authority, Leather was praised for her hard work and transformative effect on the body. Guardian journalist Sarah Boseley wrote: "Nobody disputes that Leather has turned the HFEA around through her intelligence, commitment and personality." The Chief Executive of Infertility Network UK said she put patients at the heart of the HFEA, while others said she improved its professionalism and its service as a regulatory advisor. As the first chair of the School Food Trust, she succeeded in getting junk food snacks banned from schools. Leather commented: "To the average member of the public, to have all our guidance upheld in the Upper Tribunal except the requirement in it for a reasonableness test was not a bad result." Others say the key achievement was in the way the commission carries out its basic regulatory work, with processes becoming more efficient, the website upgraded, guidance made clearer and engagement with the sector and partner agencies improved, all done in a time when resources were declining.

== Controversies ==
Leather's public appointments have led some commentators to question the motives of those who appointed her, as they were not elected posts. The Adam Smith Institute accused her of pursuing a "political agenda" against private education on behalf of politicians who lacked the "moral courage" to tackle the issue themselves. During her tenure at the Human Fertilisation and Embryology Authority, she faced opposition for stating that a child's absolute need for a father figure was "anachronistic" and out of step with "changes in society". Jack O'Sullivan, of Fathers Direct, which campaigns for the rights of fathers, said that "while discrimination against single and lesbian women was wrong, the benefits of a father figure were proven by scientific studies".

The Charities Act 2006 added to the traditional list of "charitable purposes" for which charities can be established (the prevention or relief of poverty, the advancement of education, the advancement of religion, and so forth) a requirement that their activities should be carried on "for the public benefit"; and it required the Charities Commission to determine how it would be established that the public benefit was being served. In pursuance of this requirement, in 2009 Leather instigated an investigation into private schools in order to determine whether non-profit education providers should continue to be accorded charitable status automatically. She stated she could not "see why charitable status was always merited".

Specifically, it was decided that, while providing education is a charitable purpose, doing so only in exchange for an economic fee does not meet the requirement that the purpose is carried on for public rather than private benefit. A fee-paying school could nonetheless deserve charitable status, for example if it offered bursaries, or provided teaching or coaching children from surrounding schools, or otherwise contributed. In July 2009, five private schools in the North West of England had been investigated and it was concluded that two of the five gave insufficient benefit to the public and had therefore failed the proposed test. These school would lose their charitable status in a year's time "unless they gave out more bursaries", but these schools were allowed to keep their charitable status in 2010 after re-addressing their public benefit.

The Independent Schools Council successfully challenged the controversial "public benefit" test, at a tribunal hearing which cost the Commission £185,000 in legal costs. Leather later expressed regret over the focus on bursaries, but said that most of the guidance had been upheld. The Commission was accused of exceeding its powers under the Charities Act 2006, and of drafting the "public benefit" test under Labour Party instructions. Nevertheless, upon her departure from the Charity Commission, Conservative MP Bernard Jenkin gave credit for her "courage and tremendous public service". She is listed as #31 in Quentin Letts' book, "50 People Who Buggered Up Britain".

== Public sector salary ==
In 2010, a list released by the Cabinet Office in a drive for greater transparency in public life revealed the salaries of 156 "quango" bosses, including her own remuneration package of £104,999 a year for a 3-day week as head of the Charity Commission.

== Family ==
Leather lives in Exeter with her husband, Professor Iain Hampsher-Monk, and their three children (one son and two daughters).

Non-profit organization positions
Preceded by Geraldine Peacock	Chair of the Charity Commission; 2006–2012	Succeeded by William Shawcross
