= Communitybuilders =

Communitybuilders is a £70 million programme in the United Kingdom that aims to strengthen the resilience of multi-purpose, inclusive community-led organisations that operate at the neighbourhood level (sometimes referred to as community anchors).

== Background ==
Government responsibility for Communitybuilders lies jointly with the Department for Communities and Local Government and the Office of the Third Sector.

In June 2009, a consortium, led by the Adventure Capital Fund (ACF) and including Futurebuilders England and the Community Alliance (Development Trusts Association, BASSAC and Community Matters) was appointed to deliver the programme.

== Purpose ==
Communitybuilders takes forward a commitment within the Communities in Control: Real People, Real Power white paper to build more cohesive, empowered and active communities.

The aim of the Communitybuilders programme is to help community anchor organisations work towards long-term financial stability so they can meet the needs of their communities for generations to come. Communitybuilders provides a mix of loans, grants and non-financial support at different stages of the project cycle, supporting both existing organisations and newly formed organisations
