= Rivington Heritage Trust =

Charity in the United Kingdom

- Formation: 1997; 29 years ago
- Founder: United Utilities
- Type: Charity
- Location(s): Warrington, WA5; United Kingdom
- Region served: Rivington, United Kingdom
- Website: www.rivingtonterracedgardens.org.uk/about-us/rivington-heritage-trust/

Rivington Heritage Trust, was formed 1997 to obtain charitable funding for United Utilities to enable the company to upkeep and maintain its Rivington property.

Previously known as the United Utilities Heritage Foundation, it aims to preserve the Terraced Gardens at Rivington, Lancashire, England and is incorporated with charitable aims to "To consult with stakeholders on the use and development of Rivington Terraced Gardens for the benefit of the public and the environment." The objectives are to conserve, preserve, maintain, protect and enhance for the benefit of the public land and structures of outstanding natural beauty or of historic or architecture".

== History ==
=== 1997–2000: Blue Planet Scheme ===
A group of employees of the water company in 1997 under the direction of their employer United Utilities formed a scheme for Lever Park which would have overturned the Liverpool Corporation Act 1902, which created Lever Park, enshrining in law that the corporation and its successors shall manage Lever Park, named after Leverhulme and keep open the park for the "free and uninterrupted enjoyment of the people of his native town of Bolton".

The scheme would have allowed the company to gain access to money from the Heritage Lottery Fund and Millennium Fund. United Utilities originally applied for £15 million in funding for 'Blue Planet Park' but had its plans rejected for funding by the Millennium Commission. The trusts originally planned to take over all of Lever Park including Rivington Pike, plans were opposed by six regional MPs and were met with huge local opposition. Among issues raised by the public were fears that Music festivals would be held and visitors charged admission, the water company assured the public that would never happen. Den Dover was the Constituency Member of parliament serving for the Conservatives, then in government and raised concerns that the bill presented to parliament would give the water company too much power, he feared public access could be restricted and fee's for entry charged. He opposed the plans and the Water company were forced to withdraw their bill in parliament in July 1997, known as the Lever Park Act, where it met with opposition. The trust abandoned the plans by 1998 after considerable local opposition.

=== 2000–2020: Rivington Heritage Trust ===
The present owner and successor to the corporation of Liverpool is United Utilities. The Blue Planet Scheme being rejected and opposed by locals it was not until 2012 that the owners through the Rivington Heritage Trust commenced saving the former gardens from ruin. All Rhododendron was removed from the gardens in 2006 after Ramorum Disease was found at the site.

The Rivington Heritage Trust had not achieved funding for the original plan known as the Blue Planet Scheme and formed a new plan to proceed gradually whilst lobbying and obtaining public support after its failures in 1998. By 2013 they had succeeded in obtaining £60,000 in grant funding from the Heritage Lottery Fund the Big Lottery Fund for new plans for the Rivington Terraced Gardens.

In 2012, the trust arranged alterations at the replica Liverpool Castle. The castle walls were altered by rebuilding to an angular style at the north wall and near the Keep, stonework was also removed from the wall of the replica castle prison tower as it joins the ante-chapel, the work was undertaken in 2012 as part of safety work in an effort to stop visitors climbing.

By 2016 the trust and Groundwork Cheshire Lancashire and Merseyside were successful in obtaining a grant of £3.4 million from the Heritage Lottery Fund to conserve and repair the Rivington Terraced Gardens and remaining Grade II listed structures. The trust is well funded with an income in 2020 of over £1.4 million. In order to show separation from United Utilities a lease of 50 years was granted by United Utilities to the Rivington Heritage Trust in the same year. Although the trusts corpate secretary remained United Utilities Secretariat Ltd. Clearance work has been undertaken by unpaid volunteers. The trust have used the former gardens for a variety of events in 2018 and 2019, including a two-day music festival and also sell Gin. Public events and access to the former gardens and Pike was stopped during the COVID-19 pandemic and the 2018 moorland fires.

=== 2020–present ===
In 2020, leaked plans revealed that the Rivington Heritage Trust had plans to take over part of Lever Park to rent out to tourists for Glamping, following the leak concerns were raised at a Rivington Parish Council meeting in 2020. In 2021 Lever Parks Information Centre became the Terraced Gardens Visitor Centre.

The public was prevented from access to the Pike, part of Lever Park, in conflict with the rights afforded by law enshrined in the Liverpool Corporation Act of "free and uninterrupted enjoyment" and the Countryside and Rights of Way Act during Easter by the landowners agent, Rivington Heritage Trust alongside Police for first time in its history in 2020 and 2021 during the COVID-19 pandemic. In June 2020 Police stepped up patrols on rumours of a gathering, also in May 2021 Police, United Utilities / Rivington Heritage Trust and North West 4x4 Response went patrolling with a view to arrests for offences of "gathering and proceeding to a gathering under the Criminal Justice and Public order act". In June 2021 Police officers are reported to have 'swooped' on Rivington to prevent a rumoured gathering.
