= Charity Commission for England and Wales =

Charity regulator in England and Wales

- Welsh: Comisiwn Elusennau Cymru a Lloegr

Non-ministerial government department overview
- Formed: 1853
- Jurisdiction: England and Wales
- Headquarters: 102 Petty France, London
- Employees: 511
- Annual budget: £32.35 million (2022–2023)
- Non-ministerial government department executives: David Holdsworth, chief executive officer; Dame Julia Unwin, chair
- Website: www.gov.uk/government/organisations/charity-commission

The Charity Commission for England and Wales (Welsh: Comisiwn Elusennau Cymru a Lloegr) is the statutory regulator of registered charities in England and Wales. It maintains the public register of charities and oversees compliance with charity law.

The Commission is a non-ministerial department of His Majesty's Government that regulates registered charities in England and Wales and maintains the Central Register of Charities. Its counterparts in Scotland and Northern Ireland are the Office of the Scottish Charity Regulator and the Charity Commission for Northern Ireland.

The commission has four sites in London, Taunton, Liverpool and Newport. Its website lists the latest annual reports submitted by charities in England and Wales.

During the financial year 2022–2023, the Commission regulated £88 billion of charity income and £85 billion of charity spend.

== Charity status ==
=== Definition ===
To establish a charity, an organisation must first find at least three trustees who will be responsible for the general control and management of the administration of the charity. The organisation needs to have a charitable purpose that helps the public. Afterwards, the administration must select an official name and decide on a structure for the charity that will impact aspects such as who runs the charity and how it is run. Subsequently, the creation of a governing document that explains how the charity is run is required. Finally, an electronic application must be completed if the charity’s income is at £5,000 per year, or it is a charitable incorporated organisation (CIO). There are different rules for creating a charity in Scotland and Northern Ireland.

=== Exempt, excepted, and other non-registered charities ===
Some charities are not subject to regulation by or registration with the Charity Commission, because they are already regulated by another body, and are known as exempt charities. Most exempt charities are listed in Schedule 3 to the Charities Act 2011, but some charities are made exempt by other acts. However exempt charities must still comply with charity law and may approach the Charity Commission for advice.

Some charities are 'excepted' from charity registration. This means they do not have to register or submit annual returns, but are in all other respects subject to regulation by the Charity Commission. A charity is excepted if its income is £100,000 or less and it is in one of the following groups: churches and chapels belonging to certain Christian denominations (until 2031); charities that provide premises for some types of schools; Scout and Guide groups; charitable service funds of the armed forces; and students' unions.

=== Charities operating across other national borders within the United Kingdom ===
Registration of a charity in England and Wales does not endow that status elsewhere, thus further registration has to be made before operating in Scotland or Northern Ireland.

Charities in Scotland are regulated by the Office of the Scottish Charity Regulator.

In Northern Ireland the Charity Commission for Northern Ireland was established in 2009 to replace earlier regulation by the Voluntary and Community Unit of the Department for Social Development, part of the Northern Ireland Executive.

=== Governance ===
The principles of good governance, to be followed by charities in order for them to be able to achieve and maintain charitable status, are laid down in the Charity Governance Code, published by the Charity Governance Code Steering Group.

There are two separate codes for small and large charities. The Charity Commission is not part of the Charity Governance Code Steering Group; it is only an observer, to ensure impartiality. The principles covered in the code are:

1. Organisational purpose
2. Leadership
3. Integrity
4. Decision-making, risk, and control
5. Board effectiveness
6. Equality, diversity, and inclusion
7. Openness and accountability

If a member of the public, or any of a charity's trustees, has serious concerns—for example whether funds are being used for the stated purpose of the charity, if there is a serious threat to its reputation, or if they do not like how they have been approached for donations—they can submit a complaint to the Charity Commission. Depending on how serious the complaint is, the Charity Commission will either recommend procedural improvements, require the expulsion of unsuitable trustees, or remove the organisation's charitable status altogether.

== Legislation ==
=== Establishing law ===
The Charities Act 2006 requires the Commission to be operationally independent of ministerial influence or control. Members of the commission, including the chair, are appointed by the Secretary of State for Culture, Media and Sport.

=== Charity tax law ===
The Finance Act 2010 extended charitable tax benefits (for example Gift Aid) to charities within EU member states, Norway and Iceland, rather than those just inside the UK.

=== Fundraising Regulator ===
In 2016, following the Olive Cooke scandal, British fundraising regulations were reviewed. This led to the establishment of the Fundraising Regulator. The Fundraising Regulator is an independent oversight body without statutory authority. It defines and promotes fundraising standards, investigates cases, addresses public complaints about fundraising practices, and operates a fundraising preference service that allows the public to control how charities contact them.

=== Regulatory action ===
The commission carries out general monitoring of charities as part of its regular casework. In serious cases of abuse and regulatory concern, the commission has powers outlined in the Charities Acts to conduct statutory investigations. Before taking the decision to open a statutory inquiry, it will take the approach set out in its Regulatory and Risk framework. The commission, therefore, began around 2007 to carry out an intermediate form of action described as regulatory compliance investigations. In 2010 it opened over 140 of these cases, compared to just three full statutory investigations. However, the legality of these actions was debatable as they lacked a statutory basis. A high-profile example was the commission's report into The Atlantic Bridge, after which that body was dissolved in September 2011. The commission announced in October 2011, in the context of cost-cutting and a re-focussing of its activities, that it would no longer carry out regulatory compliance investigations.

In 2012, the commission refused to grant charitable status to Plymouth Brethren Christian Church, stating that it was unclear whether the body's aims were compatible with the requirement for charities to have a public benefit. The commission stated that this was called into doubt as a result of the "exclusivity" of the body. The decision was discussed at a session of the Public Accounts Committee, during which MP Charlie Elphicke accused the commission of being "committed to the suppression of religion". The decision was later reversed by the Commission.

Between 2022 and 2023, the commission removed 4,146 charities from the register and concluded 5,726 regulatory action cases (includes 68 statutory inquiries).

== History ==
Prior to the 1840s, a body of commissioners had been established by the Statute of Charitable Uses 1601 (43 Eliz. 1. c. 4), but these proved ineffective. The Charity Commission was first established by the Charitable Trusts Act 1853. There had been several attempts at reforming charities before that which had been opposed by various interest groups including the church, the courts, the companies, and the universities. The power of the commission was strengthened by amendments to the act in 1855, 1860, and 1862.

The Charity Commission was substantially reconstituted by the Charities Act 1960 (8 & 9 Eliz. 2. c. 58), which replaced the Charitable Trusts Acts (1853-1891). This introduced new duties to determine charitable status, and to maintain a public register of charities.

The commission was criticised after the Aberfan disaster in 1966 for its intransigence and decisions on what it allowed money from the disaster fund to be spent on. It sanctioned the use of £150,000 to remove remaining spoil tips from the area after the National Coal Board refused to pay for the work. It also proposed asking parents 'exactly how close were you to your child?'; those found not to have been close to their children would not be compensated.

The Charities Act 2006 established its current structure and name. As of 31 March 2015 the commission had 288 employees and 19 agency staff in post.

The Olive Cooke case, involving a 92-year-old poppy seller who allegedly committed suicide due to overwhelming requests for donations from charities, sparked widespread public fear and media attention across England and Wales. This scandal prompted a review of the self-regulation of fundraising practices in England and Wales, as well as Scotland, subsequently leading to the introduction of self-regulatory reforms in both jurisdictions.

In 2021, The Guardian reported that Culture Secretary Oliver Dowden "had instructed officials to ensure candidates for the Charity Commission chair role were "tested" on how they would use the watchdog's powers to rebalance charities by "refocusing" them on their founding missions", in response to what he described as "a worrying trend in some charities that appear to have been hijacked by a vocal minority seeking to burnish their woke credentials."

Orlando Fraser was appointed as chair of the Charity Commission by the Secretary of State on a three-year term commencing from 25 April 2022. This appointment was not without controversy, including the refusal of the Digital, Culture, Media and Sports Committee to endorse the appointment.

== Chairs of the commission ==
Chief charity commissioner – prior to restructuring in 2006, the equivalent of the chair was the chief charity commissioner.

- Peter Erle (1853– )
- Seymour Vesey-FitzGerald (1875– )
- Sir Henry Longley (–1900)
- Charles Henry Alderson (1900–)
- Richard Fries (1992–1999)
- John Stoker (1999–2004)
- Geraldine Peacock (2004–2006), latterly acting chair

Chair of the Charity Commission – from 2006 the role of chief charity commissioner was replaced with those of chair and chief executive of the Charity Commission

- Dame Suzi Leather (2006–2012)
- William Shawcross (2012–2018)
- Tina Stowell, Baroness Stowell of Beeston (2018–2021)
- Ian Karet (24 February 2021 – 25 April 2022) – interim, term initially until 27 December 2021, extended until 25 April 2022.
- Orlando Fraser (25 April 2022 – 25 April 2025) – appointed for a three-year term, but his appointment was rejected by the Digital, Culture, Media and Sport Committee due to concerns about the selection process.
- Mark Simms (25 April 2025 – 31 December 2025): interim chair
- Dame Julia Unwin (January 2026 – present).

== See also ==
- GuideStar – UK and US databases and information on charities
- Intelligent Giving – independent guide to UK charities
