= Futurebuilders England =

Social investment fund in the UK

Futurebuilders England was a social investment fund in the UK. The fund was invested in third sector organisations delivering public services to improve their financial and strategic capability.

== Background ==
Government responsibility for Futurebuilders lies within the Office for Civil Society within the Cabinet Office. The fund was managed by Social Investment Business.

== Purpose ==
The fund aimed to strengthen the third sector's role in public service delivery through investing in schemes that demonstrated the added value that the sector could contribute to improving public services. Emphasis was put on loan finance, evaluation and knowledge management and sharing.

The Government's aims for Futurebuilders programme were to:

- Overcome obstacles to efficient service delivery
- Modernise the third sector for the long term
- Increase both the scope and scale of voluntary and community sector service delivery

== History ==
Futurebuilders was one of the recommendations in the Treasury’s Cross Cutting Review into the role of the voluntary and community sector in public service delivery, September 2002.

In the autumn of 2003 the Government ran a tendering process, managed by the Treasury, to find an organisation to run the Futurebuilders Fund. This was won in December 2003 by a consortium made up of Charity Bank, Unity Trust Bank, National Council for Voluntary Organisations and Northern Rock Foundation.

The consortium then set up a non-profit company, Futurebuilders England Ltd, to manage the fund.

In 2007, the Cabinet Office opened the tender to manage the contract of the second phase of the Futurebuilders fund (2008–11).

This tender was won by the Adventure Capital Fund (ACF), now the Social the Investment Business (SIB). Since 1 April 2008 the Futurebuilders England fund has been under the management of SIB.

== Investments ==
Futurebuilders offered investment packages to third sector organisations that wanted to improve public services in England. Part of the investment was always a loan, but parts may also be a grant and professional support.

== Evaluation ==
The Futurebuilders fund is now closed to new investments but SIB still manage the ongoing loan portfolio. In 2015, Boston Consulting Group were commissioned to evaluate the success of the fund and released a report 'A Tale of Two Funds' to tell the story of the programme.
