= National Lottery Community Fund =

UK public body

Big Lottery Fund

Non-departmental public body overview
- Formed: 1 June 2004
- Preceding Non-departmental public body: Community Fund and New Opportunities Fund
- Jurisdiction: United Kingdom
- Headquarters: Society Building, Regents Wharf, 8 All Saints Street, London, N1 9RL
- Non-departmental public body executive: David Knott, Chief Executive Officer
- Website: www.tnlcommunityfund.org.uk

The National Lottery Community Fund, legally named the Big Lottery Fund, is an executive non-departmental public body in the United Kingdom, responsible for distributing funds raised by the National Lottery for "good causes".

== Creation ==
Big Lottery Fund came into being on 1 June 2004, on the merger of two Lottery distributors: the National Lottery Charities Board (whose operating name was Community Fund) and the New Opportunities Fund. Big Lottery Fund was formally established by the National Lottery Act 2006. The Act gave the new body the extra responsibility of managing projects funded by the Millennium Commission.

In 2019, the Big Lottery Fund rebranded and became the National Lottery Community Fund. The new name intended to highlight its connection to the National Lottery.

== Role and statistics ==
The funder takes an equity-based approach to its work, investing most in places, people and communities experiencing poverty, disadvantage and discrimination. In June 2023 it launched its most recent strategy "It Starts with Community". This sets out its focus on four key missions, which are to support communities to:

1. Come together
2. Be environmentally sustainable
3. Help children and young people thrive
4. Enable people to live healthier lives.

National Lottery players raise over £30 million each week for good causes throughout the UK. Since The National Lottery began in 1994, £47 billion has been raised. The National Lottery Community Fund is responsible for distributing 40% of the good cause money raised and typically distributes over £500 million a year to communities across England, Scotland, Wales and Northern Ireland as well as working closely with Government to distribute vital grants and funding from key Government programmes and initiatives. Around eight in ten of its grants are for under £10,000.

Over 80 per cent of The National Lottery Community Fund's funds go to voluntary and community organisations. It also makes grants to statutory bodies, local authorities and social enterprises.

The National Lottery Community Fund funds projects in line with objectives set by the Government but does not fund services which other parts of government have a statutory responsibility to deliver. According to its annual report for 2010–2011, "Lottery funding is distinct from Government funding and adds value. Although it does not substitute for Exchequer expenditure, where appropriate it complements Government and other programmes, policies and funding."

== Income ==
The income of all the Lottery distributors comes from the sale of National Lottery tickets. Of every £2 spent on a Lottery ticket 56 pence (28%) goes to the "good causes". The current operator of the National Lottery is Allwyn Entertainment.

== Funding ==
The National Lottery Community Fund is a grant maker and does not operate projects itself but awards funds to organisations which operate projects. As part of the application process for funding, it requires funded organisations to outline the difference that should come about as a result of its funding.

The National Lottery Community Fund uses several methods to distribute funding. Most of its grants go to voluntary and community organisations which apply within a range of funding programmes. However, in certain cases to meet a specific need, it will also seek applications from organisations with recognised expertise or make a substantial grant to a partner to award funds on its behalf.

In 2012, the fund granted £217 million to a new body, Big Local Trust, as an endowment to be spent over the next 15 years. This money – and a further £67 million of investment income – was distributed to 150 groups of residents of local areas; each group was promised at least £1 million.

== Accountability ==
The Department for Culture, Media and Sport (DCMS) has overall responsibility for the National Lottery, and The National Lottery Community Fund receives policy and financial directions from the Office for Civil Society within DCMS, alongside the devolved governments of Northern Ireland, Scotland and Wales.

== Structure ==
The strategic direction of The National Lottery Community Fund is decided by a board made up of a chair and nine members. The Fund's decision-making on grants is devolved to country committees for each of the four UK countries – England, Wales, Scotland and Northern Ireland, as well as a UK-wide committee for cross-country projects. The chairs of these country committees sit on the main board. Each of the four countries runs their own funding programmes, based on particular priorities and needs.

The chair of The National Lottery Community Fund is Dame Julia Cleverdon. The day-to-day running of organisation is under the responsibility of a senior management team, made up of the chief executive and nine directors. The current chief executive is David Knott.

== Funding programmes ==
A list of all current and historic programmes that The National Lottery Community Fund has funded can be found on the body's website.

Some funded projects include:

=== Forces in Mind ===
£35 million has been invested by The National Lottery Community Fund on the Forces in Mind Trust, a partnership of UK forces charities and mental health organisations, led by the Confederation of Service Charities. It has been given partnership support from The Royal Foundation which will back the Trust with its own grants over a three-year programme as well as helping raise awareness of the issues facing veterans. Over the next 20 years, FIMT will provide UK-wide long-term support and advocacy for Service personnel and Veterans to make a successful transition to civilian life. The focus will be on addressing a range of problems that some ex-service personnel and their families can experience back in civilian life, such as poor mental health, family breakdown and alcohol-related problems.

=== Supporting Change and Impact ===
Supporting Change and Impact is an initiative helping The National Lottery Community Fund's grant holders, helping them to plan future service delivery in a challenging funding environment.

=== Heroes Return2 ===
Heroes Return2 funds veterans, their families, spouses and carers to visit the places where they saw action in the Second World War or to take part in commemorative events in the UK.

=== Improving Futures ===
The Improving Futures programmes helps children from families who have complex and multiple needs.

=== Wisdom Bank ===
£250,000 was given to the Wisdom Bank, a website project to "harness the experience and skills of people in the 45 to 65 age group for the wider benefit of the community of Torfaen". In two years the site registered 340 users, before it was taken over by Torfaen Council. A member of the council's audit committee criticised the spending of further public money on the site and said that lottery funding should not have been given to a project with a flawed business plan and whose purpose could have been equally well served by using social media.

=== Big Fund ===
The National Lottery Act 2006 gave Big Lottery Fund (The National Lottery Community Fund) the powers to handle non-Lottery as well as Lottery funding. Big Lottery Fund has managed non-Lottery programmes on behalf of OCS, the Department for Education and the Welsh Government. The organisation's non-Lottery funding is branded distinctly and promoted independently from Lottery funding.

=== Big Potential ===
The Big Potential programme made grants to eligible charities and social enterprises with the aim of improving the sustainability, capacity and scale of organisations in order that they may deliver greater social impact. The programme was run by Social Investment Business and its £20m investment pool closed in 2017.
