= Public–private partnerships in India =

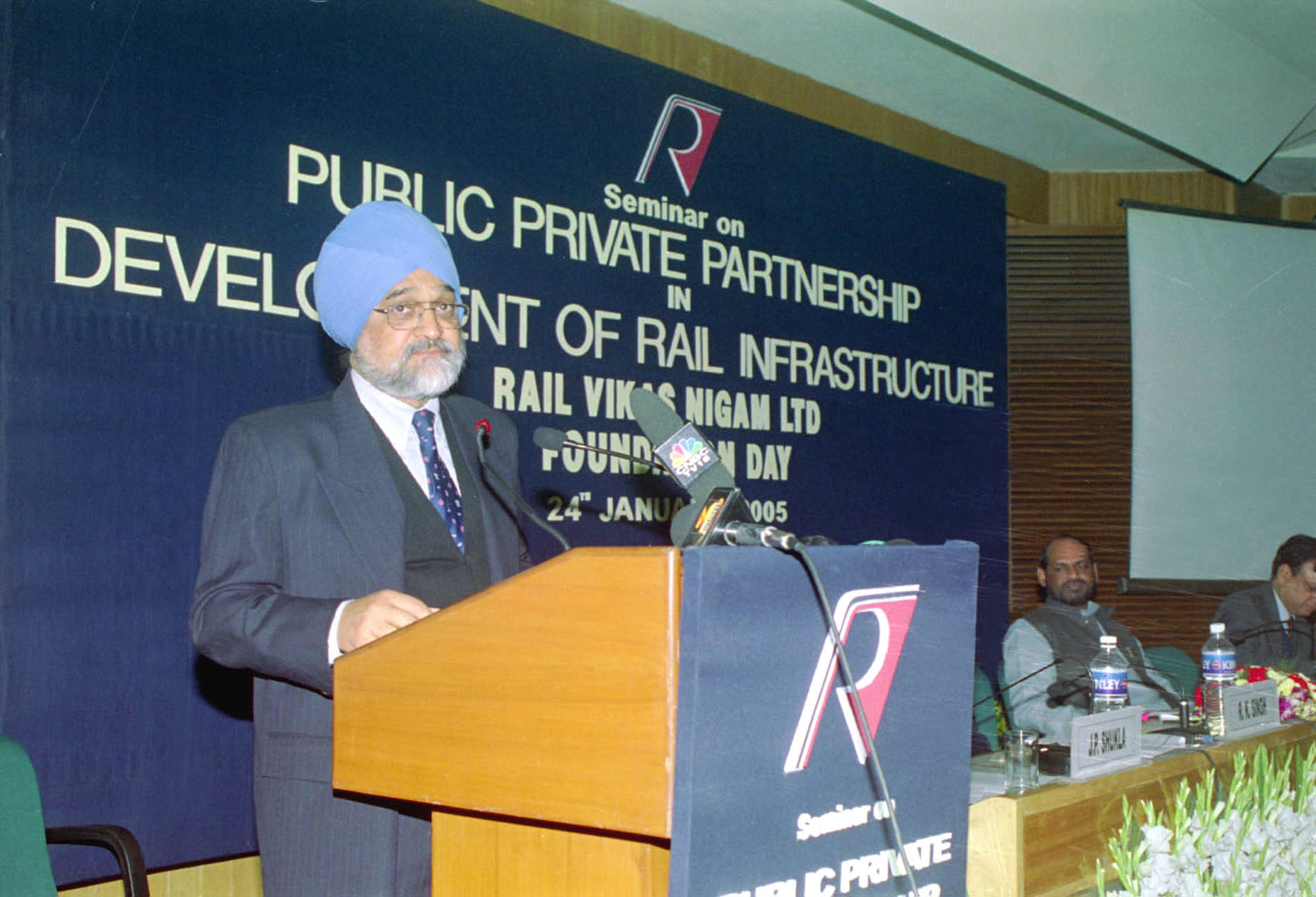
The deputy chairman on the Planning Commission, Dr. Montek Singh Ahluwalia, speaking at the inauguration of a Seminar on "Public-Private Partnership in Development of Rail Infrastructure"

The public–private partnership (PPP or 3P) is a commercial legal relationship defined by the Government of India in 2011 as "an arrangement between a statutory / government owned entity on one side and a private sector entity on the other, for the provision of public assets and/or public services, through investments being made and/or management being undertaken by the private sector entity, for a specified period of time, where there is well defined allocation of risk between the private sector and the public entity and the private entity receives performance linked payments that conform (or are benchmarked) to specified and pre-determined performance standards, measurable by the public entity or its representative".

The Government of India recognizes several types of PPPs, including: User-fee based BOT model, Performance based management/maintenance contracts and Modified design-build contracts (turnkey). Today, there are hundreds of PPP projects in various stages of implementation throughout the country.

As of November 2020, 1,103 PPP projects were launched in the country, representing a total of $274,959,000,000 of committed investments.

== PPP policies ==
The Ministry of Finance centralizes the coordination of PPPs, through its Department of Economic Affairs' (DEA) PPP Cell. In 2011, the DEA published guidelines for the formulation and approval of PPP projects. This was part of an endeavor to streamline PPP procedures and strengthen the regulatory framework at the national level to expedite PPP projects approval, reassure private parties and encourage them to enter into PPPs in India. This was one of the main roles of the Public Private Partnership Appraisal Committee (PPPAC) which is responsible for PPP project appraisal at the central level.

The Government also created a Viability Gap Funding Scheme for PPP projects to help promote the sustainability of the infrastructure projects. This scheme provides financial support (grants) to infrastructure projects, normally in the form of a capital grant at the stage of project construction (up to 20 percent of the total project).

The Government has also set up India Infrastructure Finance Company Limited (IIFCL) which provides long-term debt for financing infrastructure projects. Set up in 2006, IIFCL provides financial assistance in the following sectors: transportation, energy, water, sanitation, communication, social and commercial infrastructure.

To help finance the cost incurred towards development of PPP projects (which can be significant, and particularly the costs of transaction advisors), the Government of India has launched in 2007 the 'India Infrastructure Project Development Fund' (IIPDF) which supports up to 75% of the project development expenses.

Finally, the PPP Cell has produced a series of guidance papers and a 'PPP Toolkit' to support project preparation and decision-making processes. The objective is to help improve decision-making for infrastructure PPPs in India and to improve the quality of the PPPs that are developed. The toolkit has been designed with a focus on helping decision-making at the Central, State and Municipal levels.

== Corporations build under PPP model ==
- NSE
- NSDL
- IL&FS
- CRISIL
- Protean eGov Technologies
- IndiaFirst Life Insurance Company

== Infrastructure ==
Infrastructure in India is poor when compared to similarly developed nations. The Government of India identified public–private partnerships (PPP) as a way of developing the country's infrastructure. In the 1990s, during India's first liberalization wave, there were various attempts to promote PPPs. However, in some sectors – such as water and sanitation – it failed. India was perceived as too risky and there was significant opposition to private sector involvement. It is only in the first half of the 2000s that the first PPPs were signed and implemented. Construction of infrastructure in India requires large capital outlays and there is a deficit in supply. Over fifty percent of major infrastructure development projects in Maharashtra state are based on 3P. Projects using the 3P model have also proceeded in Karnataka, Madhya Pradesh, Gujarat, and Tamil Nadu state.

In August 2012, the Prime Minister of India, Manmohan Singh, lifted the ban on the transfer of government-owned land, relaxed land transfer policy and did away with the need for Cabinet approval for 3P projects in order to accelerate the building of infrastructure.

=== Roads ===
Sixty percent of 3P projects are for road building and they represent forty-five percent of 3P monetary value. They are a part of the National Highways Development Project (NHDP). Examples of 3P road building projects are the Golden Quadrilateral and the North–South and East–West Corridor. About 14,000 km (8,700 mi) of India's national highways are being converted to four-lane highways.

=== Ports ===
Port building projects account for ten percent of projects and thirty percent of the value of 3P. As of 2011, India had twelve major seaports and 185 minor seaports along its approximately 6,000-kilometre-long (3,700-mile) coastline. Seaports constructed via the 3P model increased the handling of cargo in India by ten percent between 2008 and 2011. Examples of port building projects include the Jawaharlal Nehru Port Trust (JNPT) in Mumbai and Chennai Port in association with P&O. The Indian government expects the National Maritime Development Programme (NMDP) to be a 3P stakeholder.

=== Water ===
In India, no city yet offers continuous (24/7) water supply. The quality of the water supply service is low, with non-revenue water being as high as 40 percent in most cities. The poor are particularly affected by this situation and end up paying more for a liter of water than their wealthier counterparts. With the objective of widening access to water services and making water services more sustainable, the Government of India promoted PPPs in the water sector in the 1990s. However, this attempt failed as the Government did not manage to create a good enabling environment for private investment and poor project preparation. Furthermore, there was important opposition to private sector involvement in water delivery.

However, after this failed first attempt, a decade later some cities tried different types of PPP arrangements, such as management contracts. The allocation of risks between the public and the private sectors was more balanced. The public sector provided part of the initial funding and focused on efficiency gains. The mindsets of policymakers and politicians also started to evolve, with a better understanding of the role of private sector companies and less opposition to their involvement in the water space. Both the 2002 and 2012 National Water Policy recognized the importance of PPPs to solve water issues in urban areas. Between 2005 and 2011, 15 water public–private partnerships were signed.

Recent failure of Water PPPs to deliver, is now putting the model into question. First, the local community was never consulted on the project, and a public outcry ensued when information was finally shared. Second, there have been serious delays in the construction and operation of water provision. And third, the public purse has been — and could in future be — hit hard. A strongly worded report by an independent committee raised serious concerns and recommended that the town's water supply services should be handed over to public ownership.

== Risks ==
There have been a number of critics associated with Public Private Partnerships in India, in particular related to the risks that come with such partnerships.

It has been argued that PPP entails greater costs than traditional government procurement processes (because of the development, bidding and ongoing costs in PPP projects). Some have questioned the value-for-money relevance of PPP projects in India.

The private sector does not provide a service that is not specifically outlined in the PPP contract. It is thus critical that key performance indicators are precisely laid out in the contract and that the government monitors closely the work of its private partner.

Furthermore, there is a cost attached to debt and while private sector can help access to finance, its either the customers or the government may end up bearing much of this cost.

Another critic of PPP projects is related to their social and political consequences, which can be significant. For example, a PPP project may result in the transfer of civil servants to the private sector, important tariff increases or resettlement issues to name a few.

Finally, PPPs often end up being renegotiated. This is due to the long-term nature of the PPP projects (some run for up to 30 years) and their complexity. It is difficult to identify all possible contingencies during project development and events and issues may arise that were not anticipated in the documents or by the parties at the time of the contract.

Other major drawbacks encountered in 3P projects in India include poorly drafted contracts and lack of understanding of contracts, inadequate resources, lack of managerial experience, breaches of contract, failures in team building, lack of performance measures, corruption and political interference.

== Key Examples ==
- Rajiv Gandhi Super-specialty Hospital, Raichur, Karnataka
- IL&FS Education with RCM Reddy

== See also ==
- Kelkar committee on PPP in India
- Public–private partnership in transition economies
- Private finance initiative
- Public-private partnerships by country
