= Sharada Dwivedi =

Indian author, historian and researcher

Sharada Dwivedi.
- Born: Sharada c. 1942; Mumbai, India
- Died: 6 February 2012 (aged 69-70); Mumbai, India
- Other name: dwivedi
- Education: Queen Mary school Sydenham College
- Occupations: Art and Architecture Historian
- Years active: 69 to 70
- Employer: artician
- Known for: Historical books
- Title: sharada dwivedi
- Partner: Bhagirath Dwivedi
- Children: 1

Sharada Dwivedi (c. 1942 – 6 February 2012) was an Indian author, historian and researcher. She wrote several books on the history and culture of both India and Mumbai (formerly Bombay). She was on the panel on the Mumbai Heritage Conservation Committee. Among her most famous work was Bombay, the Cities Within (1995). She had great fascination for Victorian-era Mumbai and later in her life, she developed a great affection for the city's art deco stylings.

== Education ==
Sharada Dwivedi completed her schooling at Queen Mary School, Mumbai, in Mumbai, and then graduated from the Sydenham College of Commerce and Economics from the University of Mumbai. She follow this with a degree in Library Science from the same university and with training in reference work in Paris.

== Conservation work ==
Dwivedi was involved in several conservation projects in Mumbai and served as a member of the Mumbai Heritage Conservation Committee. She was a member of the Executive Committee of the Urban Design Research Institute the KALA GHODA ASSOCIATION, and was a consultant to the Bombay Collaborative. In the early 1990s, disgruntled with how authors were not being paid equitably, she started her own publishing company, Eminence Designs Pvt. Ltd., which has gone on to publish over 30 titles on a variety of subjects from Bombay history, art and architecture to cookery, beauty, and film. Her book Almond Eyes & Lotus Feet, authored with Shalini Devi Holkar, was subsequently published by Harper Collins in the US.

== Death ==
Dwivedi died on 6 February 2012 in Mumbai, India after a brief illness.

== Bibliography ==
Dwivedi's writings covered subjects such as art, architecture, interiors, heritage, conservation and the traditions of cuisine and beauty.

Year	Book title	Author(s)	Publisher	ISBN
1995	Bombay, the Cities Within		India Book House	ISBN 978-8185028804
1996	Banganga, Sacred Tank		Eminence Designs	
1999	Fort walks: Around Bombay's Fort area		Eminence Designs	ISBN 978-8190060233
2000	Anchoring a City Line the History of the Western Suburban Railway and its Headquarters in Bombay	with Rahul Mehrotra	Eminence Designs	ISBN 8190060244
2000	Maharaja and the Princely States of India		Roli Books	ISBN 978-8174360816
2002	The Jehangir Art Gallery: established 21 January 1952	with Rahul Mehrotra	Jehangir Art Gallery	
2002	The Victoria Memorial School for the Blind: Founded 14 February 1902	with Rahul Mehrotra	Victoria Memorial School for the Blind	
2003	The Automobiles of the Maharajas		Eminence Designs	ISBN 978-8190060288
2006	Premchand Roychand (1831-1906), His Life and Times		Eminence Designs	ISBN 978-8190382113
2007	Almond Eyes, Lotus Feet, Indian Traditions in Beauty and Health	with Shalini Devi Holkar	William Morrow and Company	ISBN 978-0061246531
2008	Bombay Deco	with Rahul Mehrotra, Noshir Gobhai	Eminence Designs	ISBN 9788190382151

Dwivedi wrote numerous articles on conservation and urban issues on Mumbai. Among these were:

- Lives of the Indian Princes (1984) with Charles Allen
- Reach for the Stars (1993) – the corporate history of Blue Star Ltd
- The Broken Flute (1994) – a children's novel
- The Maharaja (1999)
- A Celebration of Style (2000) Abu Jani & Sandeep Khosla.

== See also ==
- Women in the art history field
