= Vijay Kelkar =

Indian economist and academic (born 1942)

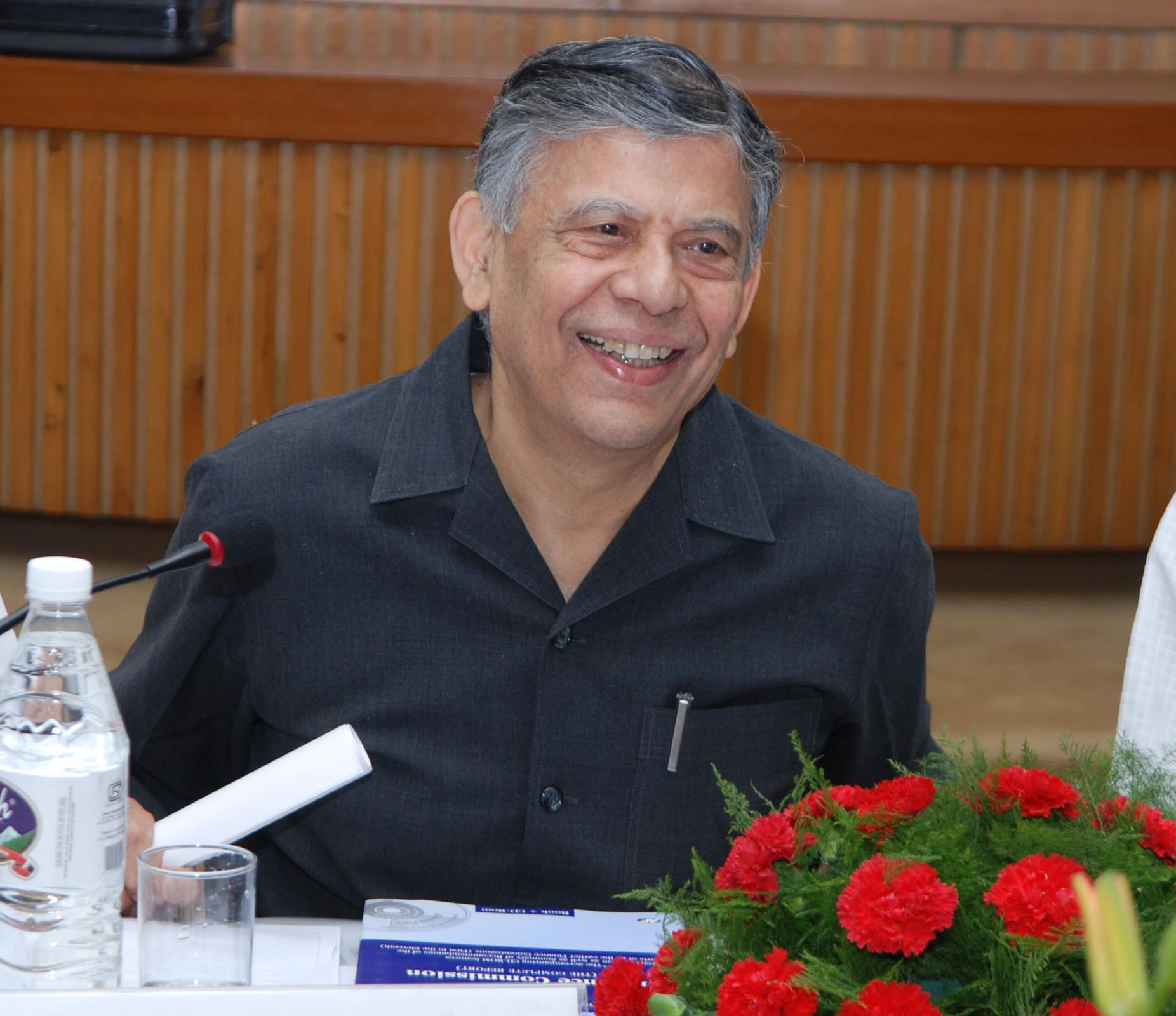
- Kelkar in 2008
- Born: 15 May 1942 (age 84); India
- Citizenship: Indian

Academic background
- Education: (B.E) College of Engineering Pune (MS) University of Minnesota (PhD) University of California Berkeley

Academic work
- Discipline: Macroeconomics and Public Economics
- Awards: Padma Vibhushan

Vijay L. Kelkar (born 15 May 1942) is an Indian economist and academic, who is the chairman of the Forum of Federations, Ottawa & India Development Foundation, New Delhi and chairman of Janwani – a social initiative of the Mahratta Chamber of Commerce, Industries and Agriculture (MCCIA) in Pune.

He is currently first chancellor of the newly founded deemed to be university Indian Institute for Human Settlements, Bengaluru.

== Education ==
Vijay Kelkar has completed his engineering degree from College of Engineering, Pune and his Master of Science from the University of Minnesota. He then completed his PhD in Economics from University of California, Berkeley.

== Career ==
He has been appointed as a trustee of Sri Sathya Sai Central Trust (Puttaparthi, A.P.) on 4 January 2014. He was also the chairman of the Finance Commission until January 2010. He was earlier advisor to the Minister of Finance (2002–2004), and is known for his role in economic reforms in India. Prior to this, he remained Finance Secretary, Government of India 1998–1999, and in 1999 he has been nominated as Executive director of India, Bangladesh, Bhutan and Sri Lanka on the board of the International Monetary Fund (IMF).

== Committees and commissions headed ==
- Kelkar committee on PPP in India
- Joint Venture (JV) Committee of NCAD (90 seater National Civil Aircraft).
- Kelkar Task Force (which recommended GST)

== Personal life ==
Vijay Kelkar is married and has a daughter.

== Published works ==
- In Service of the Republic: The Art and Science of Economic Policy (New Delhi: Penguin Allen Lane., 2019) ISBN 978-0-670-09332-8
