= Kelkar committee on PPP in India =

Investigative committee in India

Kelkar committee to evaluate PPP in India was a committee set up to study and evaluate the extant public-private partnership (PPP) model in India. The committee was set up by India's central government and headed by Vijay Kelkar. The committee was set up following 2015 Union budget of India by the then finance minister of India Arun Jaitley. It comprised 10 members. The committee submitted its recommendations to Jaitley on 19 November 2015.

== Members ==
Following were the members of the committee:

- Sharmila Chavaly - Joint Secretary at the department of Economics was the committee secretary.
- C. S. Rajan - Chief Secretary, Rajasthan,
- S. B. Nayar - chairman and managing director of Indian Infrastructure Finance Co. Ltd.
- Shekhar Shah - Director General of National Council of Applied Economic Research (NCAER).
- P. Pradeep Kumar - Managing Director of corporate banking group of State Bank of India.
- Vikram Limaye - Managing director of Infrastructure Development Finance Company (IDFC).
- Sudipto Sarkar - Lawyer.
- P. S. Behuria - retired Indian Revenue Service (IRS) officer.
- Union transport ministry representative.

== Recommendations ==
Amongst the recommendations made are:

- Establishment of 3P India.
- Case based risk allocation formula for various project participants.
- Establishment of independent regulating agencies.
- An amendment in the Prevention of corruption act to differentiate between errors of judgement and willful corrupt practices.
- Use the PPP model for airport, port and railway projects.
- Banks and other financial institutions be allowed to issue zero-coupon bonds.
- The number of banks in a consortium be restricted.
- Banks develop improved capabilities for risk assessment and appraisal.
- Specific guidelines for encashment of bank guarantees.
- To provide for monetisation of completed projects.
- Create a procedure to resume stuck projects.
- PPP should only be used for large projects.
- Creation of an inbuilt mechanism for renegotiation.
- Model concession agreements in various sectors be reviewed.
- The public sector undertakings be dissuaded from participating in PPP
- Road toll be collected electronically
- Constitution of an Infrastructure PPP Project Review Committee (IPRC) comprising an expert in finance and economics, law, and at least one related technocrat with not less than 15 years experience.
- Constitution of an Infrastructure PPP Adjudication Tribunal (IPAT) headed by a former Supreme Court/ High Court Judge with at a minimum of one technical and financial expert each as members.
