= Forum of Federations =

- Formation: 1999
- Type: NGO
- Legal status: Not for profit
- Purpose: To develop and share comparative expertise on the practice of federal and decentralized governance through a global network; and to strengthen inclusive and responsive governance in federal, decentralized, and transitioning countries.
- Headquarters: 75 Albert Street; Suite 411; Ottawa, Ontario; K1P 5E7
- Members: Australia; Brazil; Canada; Ethiopia; Germany; India; Mexico; Nigeria; Pakistan; Switzerland
- Official language: (publications) English, French, German, Spanish, Arabic, Nepali, Sinhala and Tamil
- President: Rupak Chattopadhyay
- Chairman of the Board: Georg Milbradt
- Website: http://www.forumfed.org/

The Forum of Federations is an international organization based in Ottawa, Ontario, Canada. It develops and shares comparative expertise on the practice of federal and decentralized governance through a global network. The Forum and its partners comprise a global network on federalism.

The Forum brings the world’s leading experts together with the “practitioners” of government: elected officials, civil servants, and political operatives from many countries. The Forum's learning and technical assistance programs have covered the following countries, such as Argentina, Australia, Austria, Belgium, Brazil, Burma, Canada, Chile, Ethiopia, Germany, India, Italy, Jordan, Kenya, Libya, Malaysia, Mexico, Morocco, Nepal, Nigeria, Pakistan, the Philippines, South Africa, South Sudan, Spain, Sri Lanka, Sudan, Switzerland, Tunisia, the United Arab Emirates and Yemen.

The Forum’s direct relationship with governments on each continent makes it uniquely placed to promote intergovernmental learning by working in tandem with its partner governments.

== Organization ==
The Forum of Federations is an international network of federal countries, elected officials, civil servants and scholars. The Forum was established by the Government of Canada in 1999 and currently has nine other partner governments: Australia, Brazil, Ethiopia, Germany, India, Mexico, Nigeria, Pakistan and Switzerland. Forum's headquarters are in Ottawa, Canada, and it has field offices in Kathmandu, Nepal; Addis Ababa, Ethiopia; Manila, Philippines; Berlin, Germany and India. The Forum also has offices in the MENA region, incl. Jordan, Morocco and Tunisia.

The Forum runs training and knowledge-sharing programs to address governance challenges in existing and emerging federations, as well as in devolved and decentralized countries. The Forum is concerned with the contribution that multi-level government can make to democracy building and democratic consolidation.

• The Forum assists in democracy promotion in fragile states or regions in post-conflict situation.

• It provides innovative solutions to challenges posed by multi-level governance in federal, devolved, and decentralized countries.

• It focuses on the key issues of local empowerment and federal structures.

• It provides expertise that bridges the worlds of academic research and real-world practice.

The Forum runs learning events on federalism, gives technical advice on democratic governance and produces publications for academics and practitioners of federalism. Its activities involve working with government officials as well as academic experts, young professionals, journalists and other civil society organizations. The Forum works globally – in the Americas, in Europe, in Africa and in Asia-Pacific.

== Activities ==
The Forum of Federations has a variety of Programs and activities, including, policy and development programs across the world, publishes books, reports and papers related to federalism and democracy, and hosts educational events and conference on federalism and governance issues.

=== Programs ===
The Forum has two branches of programs: Policy and Research and Development Assistance.

- Policy Programs are uniquely able to combine theoretical knowledge of the practice of multilevel governance with practical experience. They also provide and develop invaluable comparative international experiences supporting both the development of solutions to multilevel governance challenges, and the overall body of knowledge in the field. Policy Program research acts as a hub for knowledge exchange between researches and governance practitioners globally. The Forum focuses on policies related to Governance and Service Delivery, Environment, Constitutional Issues and Diversity & Inclusion.
- Development Assistance Programs (DAP) encompass a wide range of activities related to strengthening inclusive societies, gender equality, peace, and responsive and effective governance through supporting federalization, decentralization, and devolution processes in transitioning states. The Forum's programs have taken place or are planned in Burma, Chile, Ethiopia, Iraq, Jordan, Libya, Morocco, Nepal, Nigeria, Pakistan, the Philippines, South Africa, Sri Lanka, South Sudan, Sudan, Tunisia and Yemen. These programs focus on building capacity in multilevel governance among stakeholders.
  - MENA Program Empowering Women for Leadership Roles in the Middle East and North Africa Region (Jordan, Morocco, and Tunisia). The MENA program for women’s leadership, funded by Global Affairs Canada, was initiated in 2016 as a seven-year project. Its goal is to empower women and advance inclusiveness in governance in Jordan, Morocco, and Tunisia. To achieve this, the project aims to increase women’s capacity to engage in leadership roles and governance processes as well as enhance women, men, and gender-equality allies’ ability to influence policies around inclusiveness.

=== Publications ===
Published series of books and reports on major themes of federalism:

- The Forum of Federations Handbook of Federal Countries 2020
- Public Security in Federal Polities
- Gender Equality and Federalism
- Sub-National Constitutions in Federal Systems
- Federalism and Education: Ongoing Challenges and Policy Strategies in Ten Countries
- Intergovernmental Relations in Federal Systems
- Global Dialogue on Federalism Series
- Diversity and Unity in Federal Countries, ISBN 978-0-7735-3732-3
- Local Government and Metropolitan Regions in Federal Systems, ISBN 978-0-7735-3562-6
- Foreign Relations in Federal Countries, ISBN 978-0-7735-3501-5
- The Practice of Fiscal Federalism, ISBN 978-0-7735-3301-1
- Legislative, Executive, and Judicial Governance in Federal Countries, ISBN 978-0-7735-3134-5
- Distribution of Powers and Responsibilities in Federal Countries, ISBN 978-0-7735-2974-8
- Constitutional Origins, Structure, and Change in Federal Countries, ISBN 978-0-7735-2849-9

Audio-Visual and Multi-Media: The forum releases videos and educational content to increase awareness about Federalism and issues regarding federal & devolved governance. Most recently, the Forum has released an all new podcast that examine the principles and practice of federal and multilevel governance systems with a comparative international perspective.

- What is Fiscal Federalism? https://www.youtube.com/watch?v=4CH8qlDn0BY
- Learning About Federalism Series https://www.youtube.com/watch?v=1MbaKCXqytA
- Forum Fedcast
- Forum of Federations 20th Anniversary https://www.youtube.com/watch?v=VvUl_fiijI0

=== Educational events and Conferences ===
The Forum organizes approximately 40 events a year, workshops, roundtables, training sessions, where participants learn or refine their knowledge about the practices of federalism, and how to apply their learning in their countries. Events take place in over 20 countries.

- Problem-solving: Current or recent projects, as of June 2013, on federalism include courts and judicial systems, water, internal markets, gender and leadership, health care and federalism, joint service delivery, revenue sharing and decentralization, oil and gas, local and metropolitan governance, public security, climate change and environmental governance, benchmarking, immigration, and integration of newcomers.
- International Conferences: On average every three years, sponsored by Canada (1999), Switzerland (2002), Belgium (2005), India (2007) and Ethiopia (2010). Conferences are attended by heads of state and heads of government (e.g. Johannes Rau, president of Germany, in 2002; Indian Prime Minister Dr. Manmohan Singh and Ethiopian Prime Minister Meles Zenawi in 2007), as well as ministers, judges, senior officials, young professionals, academics and other specialists from around the world, incl. those from Argentina, Australia, Brazil, Germany, Malaysia, Mexico, Nepal, Nigeria, Pakistan and the Philippines.

== History ==
The Forum was established as an ongoing organization in 2000, following the September 1999 First International Conference on Federalism in Mont-Tremblant, Quebec. The event drew then world leaders such as Canadian Prime Minister Jean Chrétien, i.e. one from Canada, Australian Prime Minister John Howard, i.e. one from Australia, Brazilian President Fernando Henrique Cardoso, i.e. one from Brazil, and Mexican President Ernesto Zedillo, i.e. one from Mexico. Four consecutive International Conferences were organized in Switzerland, Belgium, India and Ethiopia. Additional International Conferences would be organized in Canada, Australia, Chile, Argentina, Brazil, Mexico, South Africa and Pakistan. Following the 2005 Conference held in Brussels, a number of countries joined the Forum as funding partners, establishing it as a membership-based international organization.

Over the years, the Forum has expanded the focus of its work to include not only established federal countries but also countries in post-conflict situations adopting federal forms of governance and those involved in processes of devolution and decentralization. As of 2017, ten governments, Australia, Brazil, Canada, Ethiopia, Germany, India, Mexico, Nigeria, Pakistan and Switzerland, had signed agreements as partners of the Forum and are represented on the Forum’s Strategic Council and Board of Directors, supporting the activities of the organization and providing expertise. Most recently, to commemorate the 20th anniversary of the organization's founding, the Forum hosted an International Dialogue on the Future of Federalism - a series of webinars convening world-leading experts to examine these critical issues of federal and multilevel governance.

== Membership ==
Currently, or as of 2023, the Forum of Federations has ten members:

- Australia
- Brazil
- Canada
- Ethiopia
- Germany
- India
- Mexico
- Nigeria
- Pakistan
- Switzerland

== Officials ==
- Board members (2021): Georg Milbradt (Germany) chair; Salma Siddiqui (Canada) vice chair; Hans Altherr (Switzerland); Christian Paradis (Canada); Birtukan Ayondadi (Ethiopia); Beatrice Keleher Raffoul (Canada); Julius Ihonvbere (Nigeria); Miguel Griesbach de Pereira Franco (Brazil); Saleem Mandviwalla (Pakistan); Roger Wilkins (Australia)
- President and chief executive officer: Rupak Chattopadhyay (India)
- Fellows of the Forum: David Cameron (Canada), Vijay Kelkar (India); Arnold Koller (Switzerland); Thomas Pfisterer (Switzerland); Bob Rae (Canada); Mian Raza Rabbani (Pakistan); Ana Carolina Lorena (Brazil); Mendoza Ruiz (Mexico)

== Federal bilateral relations ==
Canada-Nigeria relations
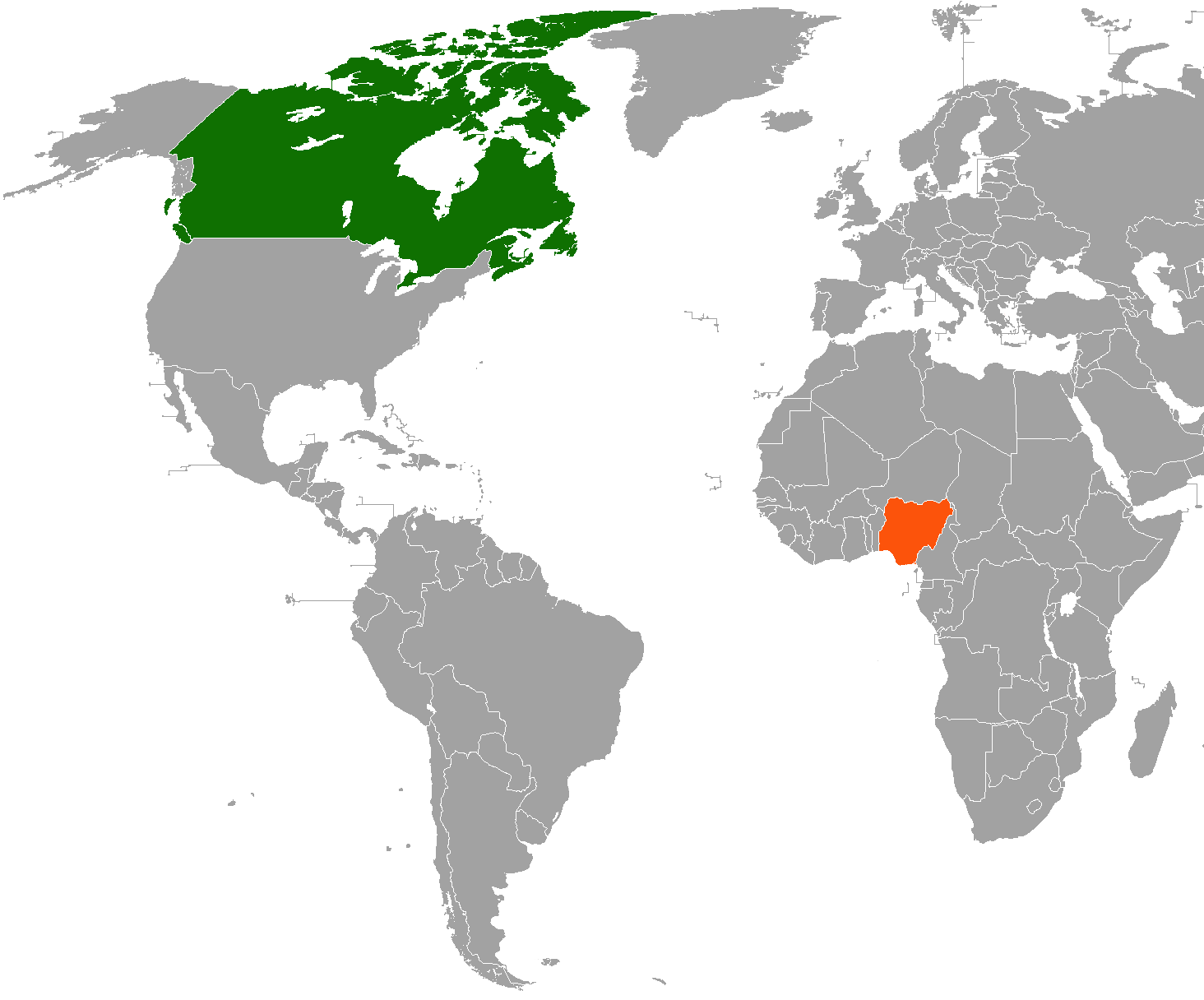

- Canada: Nigeria

Brazil-India relations
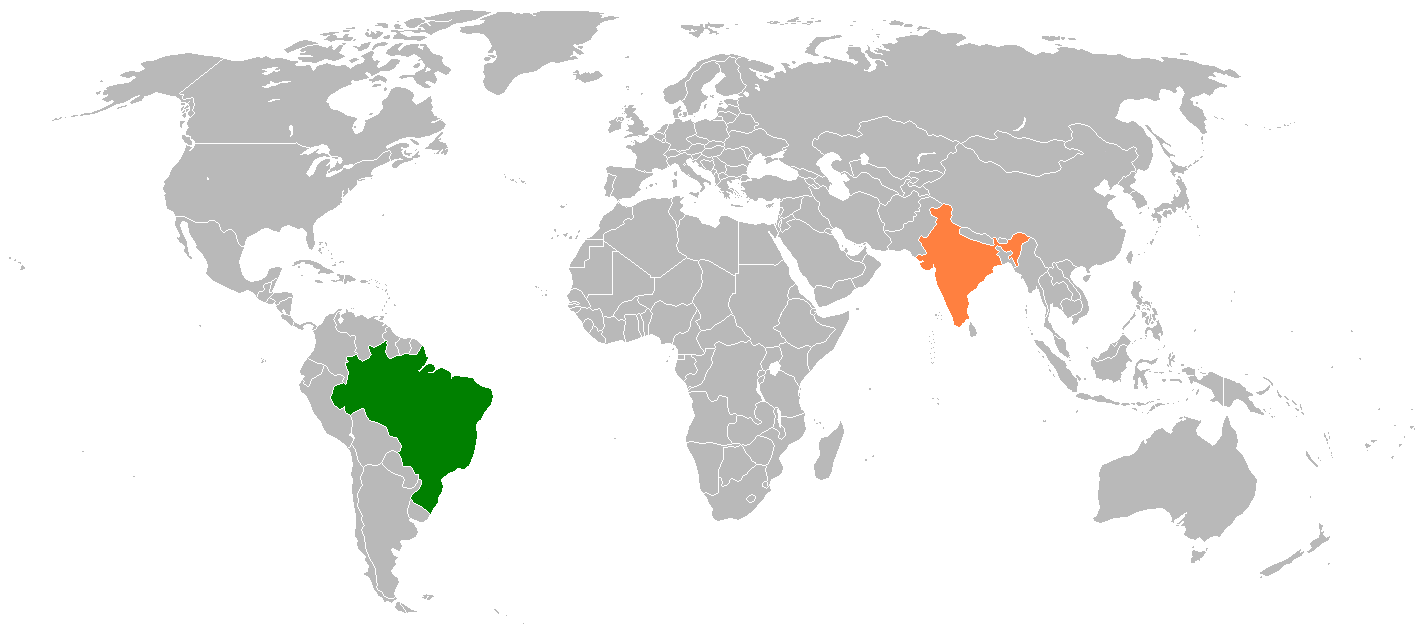
- Brazil: India

Australia-Germany relations
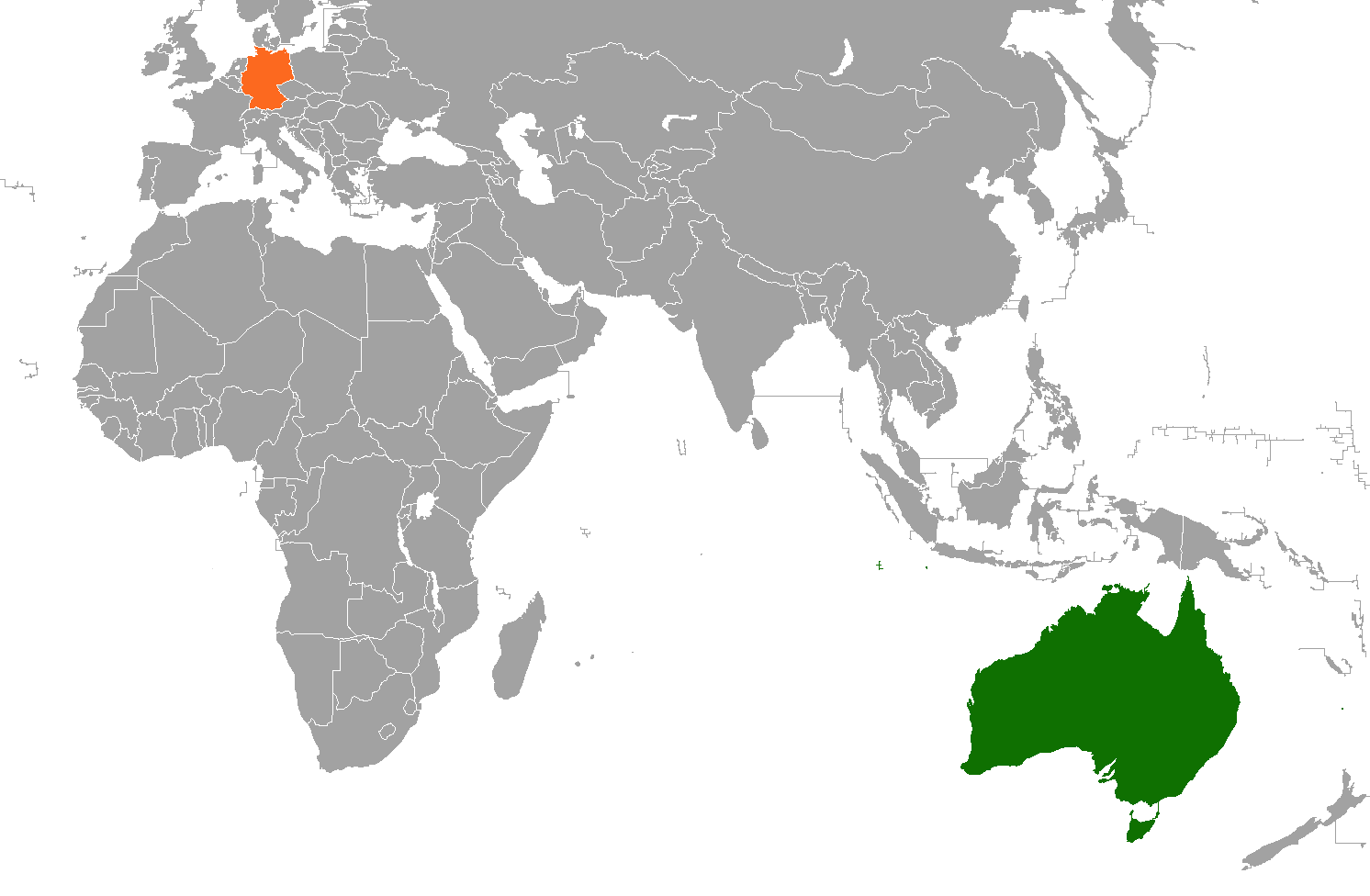

- Australia: Germany

Mexico-Pakistan relations
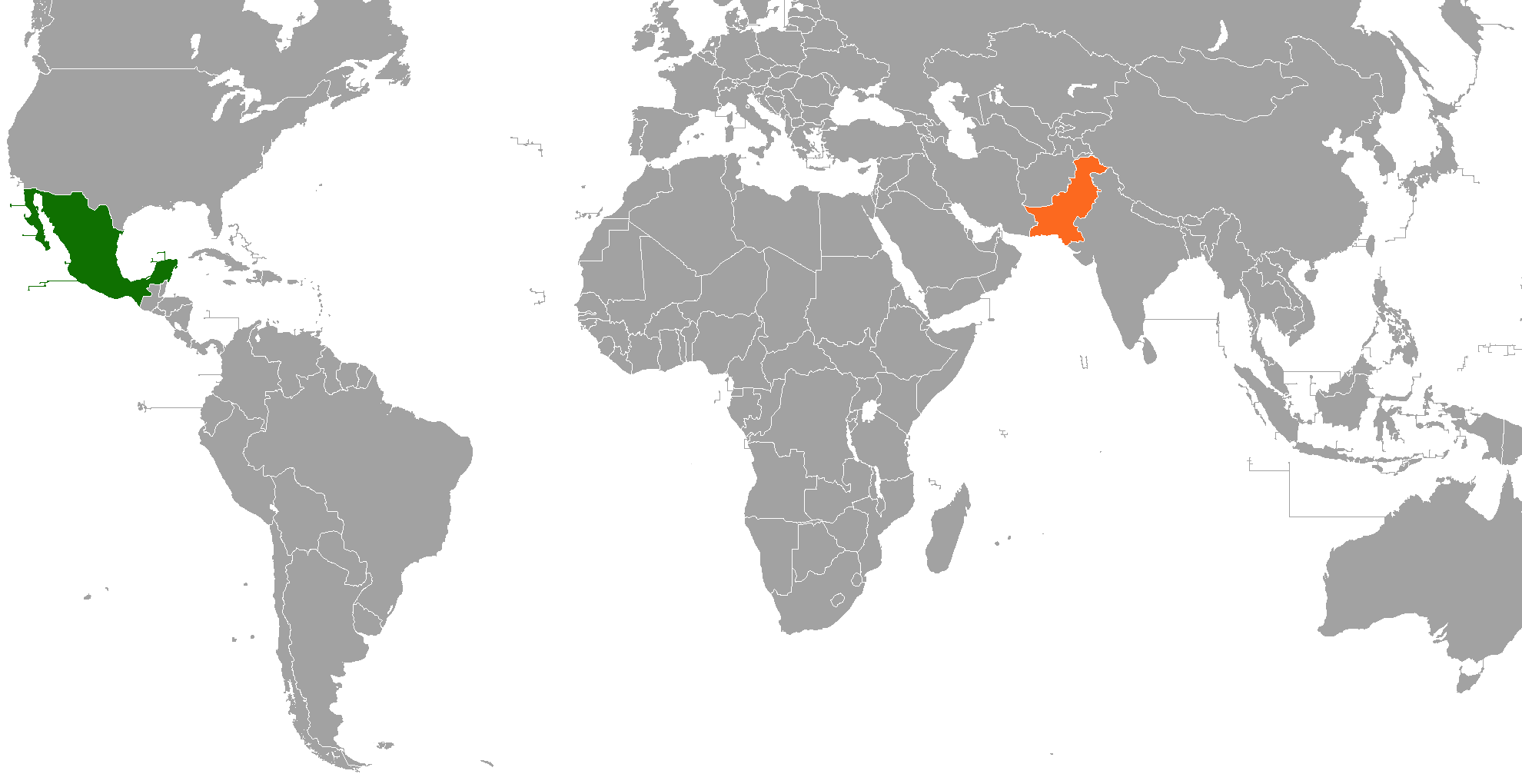

- Mexico: Pakistan

Ethiopia-Switzerland relations
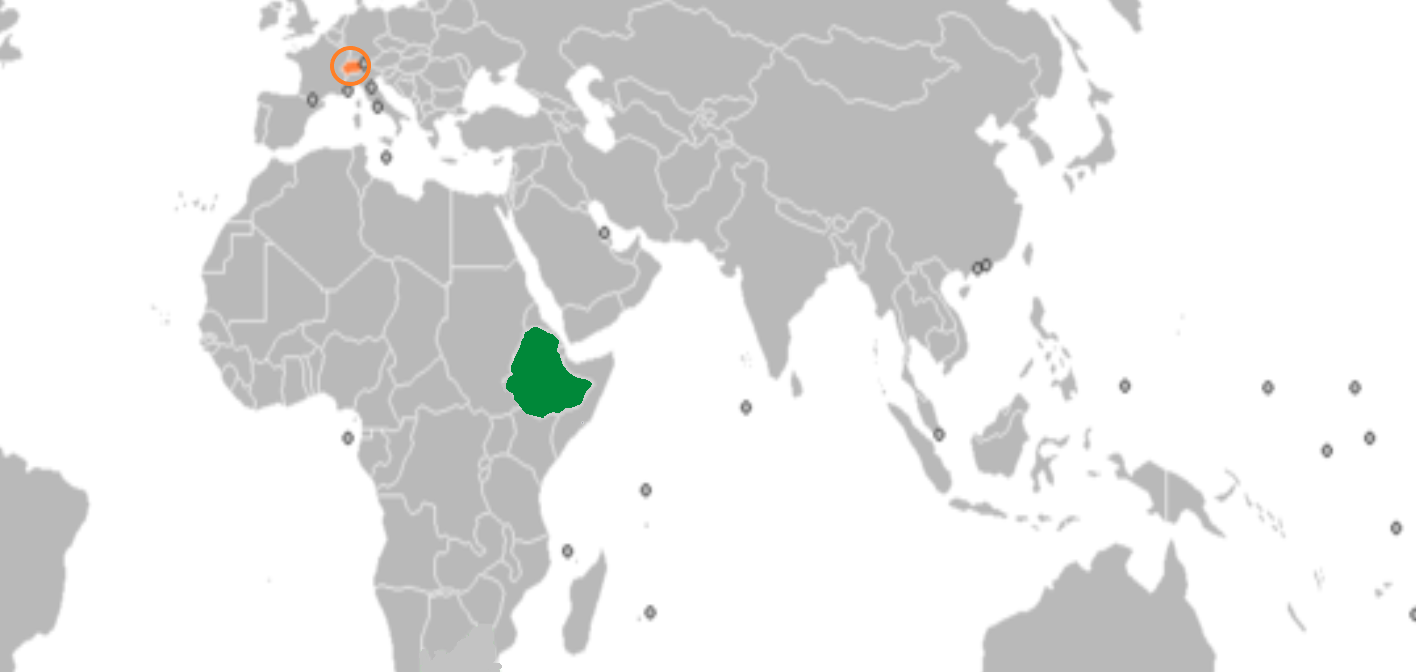

- Ethiopia: Switzerland
