= Public–private partnership in transition economies =

Public–private partnerships in transition economies have become increasingly popular since 1990. They are based on the example of public–private partnerships (PPPs) in developed countries after the model again became popular in the 1980s. PPPs have yet to prove that they are appropriate in transition economies because of political and economic differences.

== Types and sectors ==
Two broad categories of the PPPs can be identified: joint ventures between public and private stakeholders; and contractual PPPs.

PPPs have been created worldwide in sectors including power generation and distribution, water and sanitation, refuse disposal, pipelines, hospitals, school buildings and teaching facilities, stadiums, airports and air traffic control, prisons, railways, roads, information technology and housing.

== Partnerships in developing countries ==
According to the ADB, Privatization and PPPs have reached nearly all developing countries, generating more than $400 billion in proceeds in 1990–2003. Activity peaked in 1997, but resumed expansion in 2001. Activities were concentrated in a small group of countries. Five countries —Brazil, PRC, India, Poland, and Russian Federation—accounted for more than 40% of activity in 1990–2003.

The success or failure of PPP projects has not been systematically assessed (Roseneau, 1999).

Examples of successful projects include supporting small enterprises in Kazahjstan, a gas pipeline in China, intellectual property rights training in China, human rights training in Venezuela and the National Partnership Forum in Nigeria.

In Africa, PPPs have been successfully implemented in transport, telecommunications, water and sanitation, power, and eco-tourism. In Bangladesh, the Infrastructure Investment Facilitation Center (IIFC) facilitates private sector investment. As a result of IIFC efforts, the telecom sector has become a very active private investment area.

In China, PPPs have been implemented for over 20 years and has been increasingly recognized as an effective and appropriate mechanism to manage the complexity of the development challenges and the attainment of the Millennium Development Goals.

In India, the Government of India (GOI) developed enabling tools and activities to spur private sector investments using public–private partnerships.

In Vietnam, trial regulations for PPP infrastructure development took effect on January 15, 2011. The State's capital portion must not be higher than 30 percent, with the remainder coming from the private sector and other sources.

== Challenges ==
Challenges for PPP's in developing countries include:

Based on a study by Sader (2000) and the Camdessus Report, which focused on the experience with partnerships in the water sector, the main obstacles within developing countries include:

- Conflicting aims—Often one project is expected to serve several policy objectives, e.g., financial, macroeconomic, social and environmental. Protests against individual projects have rebounded on investors rather than the initiating authorities.
- Award procedures—Award procedures often lack transparency and do not employ objective evaluation criteria. Corruption has been a problem – in general, and in the specific context of 22 DAF/INV/WP(2004)4/ANN4 awards. Some projects were compromised by official preference for local participation, preferred sub-contractors or suppliers and the employment of poorly qualified local staff.
- Regulatory frameworks—Existing legislation in many countries was designed to define public sector responsibility in infrastructure and is inadequate to govern private participation. In addition, human capital such as relevant regulatory expertise is in short supply in many countries without much experience in privately operated utilities.
- Public governance—Multiple public authorities attempted to enforce conflicting rules and objectives, e.g., central versus sub-national governments, or regulatory bodies versus ministries. In addition, non-existent or inexperienced regulators created uncertainty about price and tariff setting.
- Existing service providers—Incumbent service providers, often state owned, often receive preferential treatment.
- Political commitment—In countries where the rule of law is not firmly entrenched, new administrations reneged on contracts signed by previous administrations. There also have been several cases of governments reneging on contractually agreed terms (e.g. the right to levy cost-recovering tariffs) in the fact of public dissatisfaction.

== Best practices ==
Advocates contend that PPP successes in developed countries lay a good foundation for PPPs in developing countries. They claim that giving more space to the competitive private sector produces greater efficiencies and increases innovation and improved quality. Given the right incentives and environment, the private sector can also mobilize the capital necessary for expensive infrastructures and services.

According to the United Nations, good governance is open to much interpretation but six core principles are widely accepted:

1. Participation—the degree of involvement of all stakeholders;
1. Decency—the degree to which the formation and stewardship of the rules is undertaken without harming or causing grievance to people;
1. Transparency—the degree of openness with which decisions are made;
1. Accountability—the extent to which political actors are responsible to society for what they say and do;
1. Fairness—the degree to which rules apply equally to everyone in society; and
1. Efficiency—the extent to which limited human and financial resources are applied without waste, delay or corruption or without prejudicing future generations.
