= Rahul Mehrotra =

Indian architect

- Education: Campion School Bombay; CEPT University; Harvard University
- Occupation: Architect
- Projects: Restoration of the Chowmahalla Palace

Rahul Mehrotra is Founder Principal of architecture firm RMA Architects (founded in 1990 as Rahul Mehrotra Associates) of Mumbai and Boston, and is Professor of Urban Design and Planning, and John T. Dunlop Professor in Housing and Urbanization at the Harvard Graduate School of Design (GSD).

He has been one of the activists behind the declaration of urban precincts as conservation areas in Mumbai and one of the founder members of the Kala Ghoda area rejuvenation movement, the restoration of the Oval Maidan, and the formulation of several citizens' associations in the historic Fort District in Mumbai. He was also executive director of the Urban Design Research Institute (1994-2004), where he is now a trustee. The UDRI is also actively involved in researching and influencing policy for the historic district, and the city more generally. He is also a founding board member of the Indian Institute for Human Settlements (IIHS).

He graduated from CEPT University and Harvard Graduate School of Design.

== Selected projects ==
Children's Museum at the Chhatrapati Shivaji Maharaj Vastu Sangrahalaya (Mumbai)

CEPT University Library (Ahmedabad)

Kasturbhai Lalbhai Gallery (Ahmedabad)

Hathigaon (Jaipur)

KMC Corporate Office (Hyderabad)

Novartis Campus (Basel, Switzerland)

Capela da Nodda Senhora Do Monte (Goa)

Visitor Centre at the Chhatrapati Shivaji Maharaj Vastu Sangrahalaya (Mumbai)

House In A Tea Garden (Conoor)

Three Court House (Alibaug)

Taj Mahal Visitor Centre (with the Taj Mahal Conservation Collective) (Agra)

Hewlett-Packard Software Campus (Bengaluru)

LMW Corporate Headquarters (Coimbatore)

Restoration Of The Chowmahalla Palace Complex (Hyderabad)

Campus For Magic Bus (Panvel)

Community Toilets for SPARC (The Society for the Promotion of Area Resource Centers) (Mumbai)

Extension to the Chhatrapati Shivaji Maharaj Vastu Sangrahalaya (Mumbai)

Project 88 (Mumbai)

Gallery Maskara (Mumbai)

Bandhej Stores (Ahmedabad, Bengaluru, Mumbai)

== Books ==
“Taj Mahal: Multiple Narratives”, co-authored with Amita Baig and published by Om books International. 2017

"Architecture in India since 1990," published by Pictor, Mumbai. 2011.

"Bombay Deco", co- authored with Sharada Dwivedi and published by Eminence Designs. 2008.

"Banganga and Malabar Hill", co –authored with Sharada Dwivedi, published by Eminence Designs, April 2006 ( new and revised edition)

"A City Icon – Victoria Terminus Bombay 1887( now Chhatrapati Shivaji Terminus 1996)" co- authored with Sharada Dwivedi and published by Eminence Designs. 2006.

"Michigan Debates on Urbanism" vol 1: Everyday Urbanism, editor for volume, published by The University of Michigan, A. Alfred Taubman College of Architect + Urban Planning. 2005

"Conservation After Legislation – Issues and Ideas for Bombay" Co-edited with Abha Narain Lambah, published by the Urban Design Research Institute, Mumbai. 2004.

"The Bombay High Court – The Story of the Building – 1878-2003" co-authored with Sharada Dwivedi, published by Eminence Design, Mumbai. 2003.

"World Architecture A Critical Mosaic 1900-2000 – Volume VIII, South Asia", Editor for book documenting canonical works of architecture of the century in South Asia, General editor Kenneth Frampton, published by the Architectural Society of China, Beijing and the Union of International Architects, Beijing. 2000.

"Anchoring A City Line – The Western Railway Headquarters 1899-1999" Co-authored with Sharada Dwivedi and published by Eminence Designs, Mumbai. 2000.

"Fort Walks – 10 walks in Bombay's Historic City Center" Co-authored with Sharada Dwivedi and Published by Eminence Designs, Mumbai, 1999, (Reprinted in 2001).

"Bombay To Mumbai – Changing Perspectives" Co-edited with Pauline Rohatgi and Pheroza Godrej, published by Marg magazine, Mumbai, 1997 (Reprinted in 2001).

"Banganga – Sacred Tank" A book on the history of the Banganga Temple complex and Malabar Hill, Mumbai Co-author with Sharada Dwivedi and published by Eminence Designs, Mumbai. 1996.

"Bombay – The Cities Within" A book on the urban history of Bombay, Co-author with Sharada Dwivedi and published by India Book House and Eminence Designs, 1995, (Reprinted in 1997, 2001).

"The Fort Precinct In Bombay – Conserving an Image Center". A two volume publication on the Fort area co-edited and compiled with Gunter Nest and Sandhya Savant and published by the Goethe Institute. 1995.

== Exhibitions ==
"The State of Architecture" : practices and processes in India. 6 January-20 March 2016. National Gallery of Modern Art, Mumbai.

"Kinetic City" Exhibition by RMA Research, British School at Rome, 5–26 February 2013.

"Water – Curse or Blessing" exhibition featuring Hathigaon, Village for a hundred elephants, Aedes Gallery, Berlin, Germany, 9 September – 21 October 2011.

"Working in Mumbai" an exhibition on the works of RMA architects, Wolk Gallery, MIT, Cambridge, USA. 2008.

"Goa 2100" an exhibition on transforming Panjim City in Goa towards a sustainable future. Exhibition as part of Indian Team at the World Gas Conference, Tokyo, Japan. 2003.

"The Works of Rahul Mehrotra at the Shanghai Biennale" Exhibition on Contemporary Art and Architecture – organized by the Contemporary Art Museum Shanghai, China. 2002.

"Memories in Asbestos – an installation on interpretations of the Kalaghoda Art District in Bombay" Installation in collaboration with Mumbai artist Atul Dodiya, 1–14 February 2000, at Chemould Art Gallery, Mumbai.

"The Buildings of the Kala Ghoda Art District- an exhibition on the historic buildings of the district together with some urban conservation strategies", in collaboration with the Urban Design Research Institute, 1–14 February 2000, at the Stuttgart Hall, Max Mueller Bhavan Bombay.

"Beginnings – projects of twelve young architects", June 1998 at the Municipality Contemporary Art Gallery, Ankara, Turkey.

"Architecture on the Horizon", an exhibition on emerging architects from around the World, Aug – Sept 1996 at the RIBA Architectural Centre, London.
