= Indian Institute for Human Settlements =

Indian urban studies research institute

- Founded: 2008
- Headquarters: Bengaluru, India
- Key people: Aromar Revi, Founding Director
- Website: iihs.co.in

The Indian Institute for Human Settlements (IIHS) is an Indian knowledge institution committed to the equitable, sustainable and efficient transformation of India's cities, towns and villages. It was founded in 2008 as a not-for-profit company. The main campus is located in Bengaluru, with offices in Delhi, Chennai, and Mumbai. IIHS is developing a 54-acre campus in Kengeri, Bengaluru, designed to be a living lab where one can experience sustainability in action. The land was allotted in 2012 through an MoU with the Government of Karnataka. IIHS was declared as an Institution Deemed to be University under the Distinct category specified in the UGC regulations, 2023.

It has been the Sponsoring Body of the IIHS (Institution Deemed to be) University since 2025. IIHS ran a nine-month certificate programme in urban studies and practice, called the Urban Fellow Programme, from 2016 to 2025.

== Governance ==
IIHS's Board members include Nandan Nilekani, Deepak Parekh, Aromar Revi, Nasser Munjee, K. P. Krishnan, Renana Jhabvala, Chandrashekhar Bhaskar Bhave, Radhakishan Shivkishan Damani, Vijay Laxman Kelkar, S. V. Ranganath and Rahul Mehrotra.

== IIHS (Institution Deemed to be) University ==
IIHS is the Sponsoring Body of the IIHS (Institution Deemed to be) University, which was recognised by the University Grant Commission in 2025. The Chancellor is Vijay Kelkar and Vice-Chancellor is Aromar Revi.

The IIHS (Institution Deemed to be) University offers interdisciplinary Master’s and Doctoral degrees centred around urban issues, and aligned with India's National Education Policy 2020.
