= Public–private partnership =

Partnership between a government and private company

A public–private partnership (PPP, 3P, or P3) is a long-term arrangement between a government and private sector institutions. Typically, it involves private capital financing government projects and services up-front, and then drawing revenues from taxpayers and/or users for profit over the course of the PPP contract. Public–private partnerships have been implemented in multiple countries and are primarily used for infrastructure projects. Although they are not compulsory, PPPs have been employed for building, equipping, operating and maintaining schools, hospitals, transport systems, and water and sewerage systems.

Cooperation between private actors, corporations and governments has existed since the inception of sovereign states, notably for the purpose of tax collection and colonization. Contemporary "public–private partnerships" came into being around the end of the 20th century. They were aimed at increasing the private sector's involvement in public administration. They were seen by governments around the world as a method of financing new or refurbished public sector assets outside their balance sheet. While PPP financing comes from the private sector, these projects are always paid for either through taxes or by users of the service, or a mix of both. PPPs are structurally more expensive than publicly financed projects because of the private sector's higher cost of borrowing, resulting in users or taxpayers footing the bill for disproportionately high interest costs. PPPs also have high transaction costs.

PPPs are controversial as funding tools, largely over concerns that public return on investment is lower than returns for the private funder. PPPs are closely related to concepts such as privatization and the contracting out of government services. The secrecy surrounding their financial details complexifies the process of evaluating whether PPPs have been successful. PPP advocates highlight the sharing of risk and the development of innovation, while critics decry their higher costs and issues of accountability. Evidence of PPP performance in terms of value for money and efficiency, for example, is mixed and often unavailable.

== Definition ==
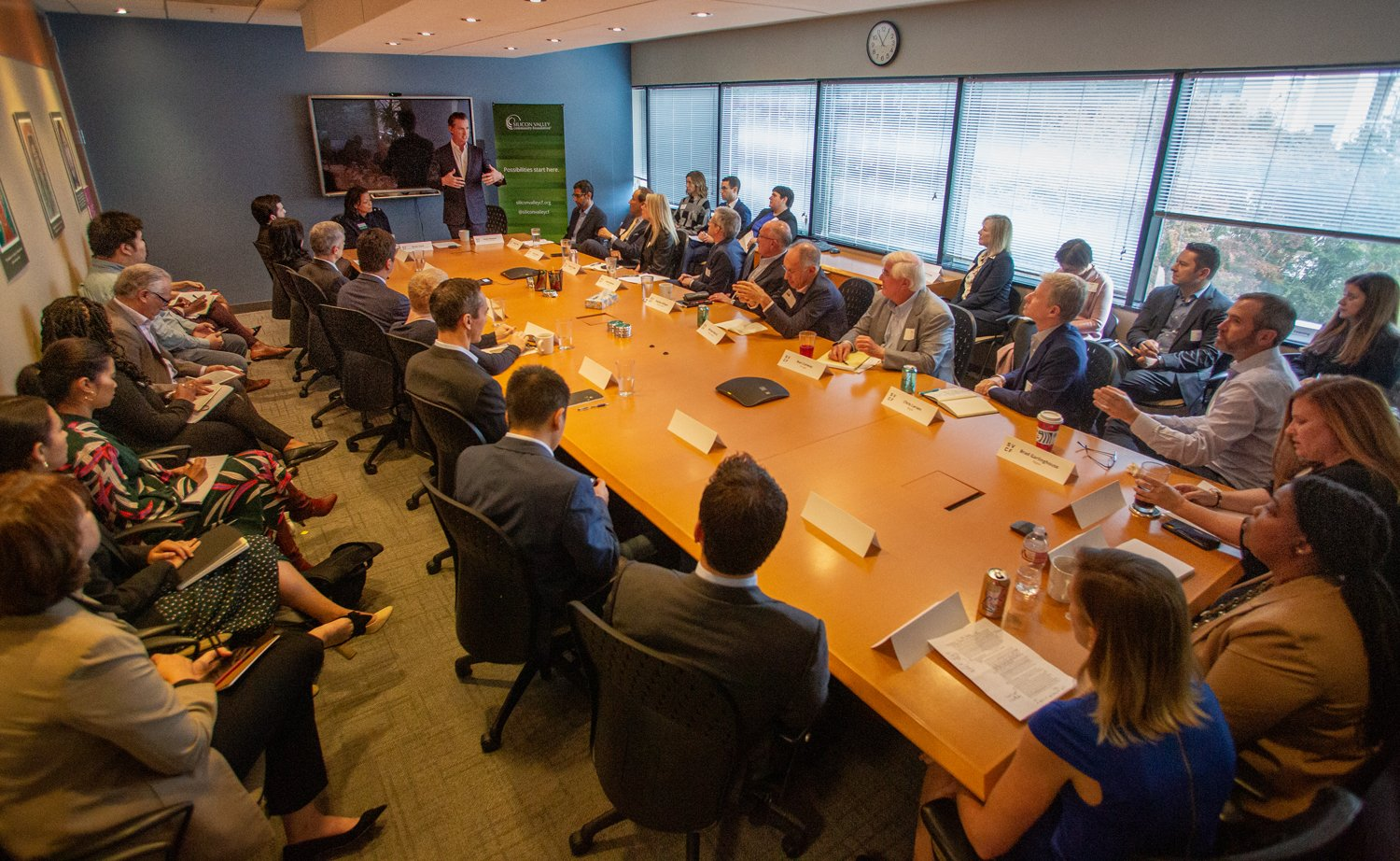
Gavin Newsom hosts a meeting for employers about public-private partnerships. (13 November 2019)

There is no consensus about how to define a PPP. The term can cover hundreds of different types of long-term contracts with a wide range of risk allocations, funding arrangements, and transparency requirements. The advancement of PPPs, as a concept and a practice, is a product of the new public management of the late 20th century, the rise of neoliberalism, and globalization pressures. Despite there being no formal consensus regarding a definition, the term has been defined by major entities.

For example, The OECD formally defines public–private partnerships as "long term contractual arrangements between the government and a private partner whereby the latter delivers and funds public services using a capital asset, sharing the associated risks".

According to David L. Weimer and Aidan R. Vining, "A P3 typically involves a private entity financing, constructing, or managing a project in return for a promised stream of payments directly from government or indirectly from users over the projected life of the project or some other specified period of time".

A 2013 study published in State and Local Government Review found that definitions of public-private partnerships vary widely between municipalities: "Many public and private officials tout public–private partnerships for any number of activities, when in truth the relationship is contractual, a franchise, or the load shedding of some previously public service to a private or nonprofit entity." A more general term for such agreements is "shared service delivery", in which public-sector entities join with private firms or non-profit organizations to provide services to citizens.

=== Debate on privatization ===
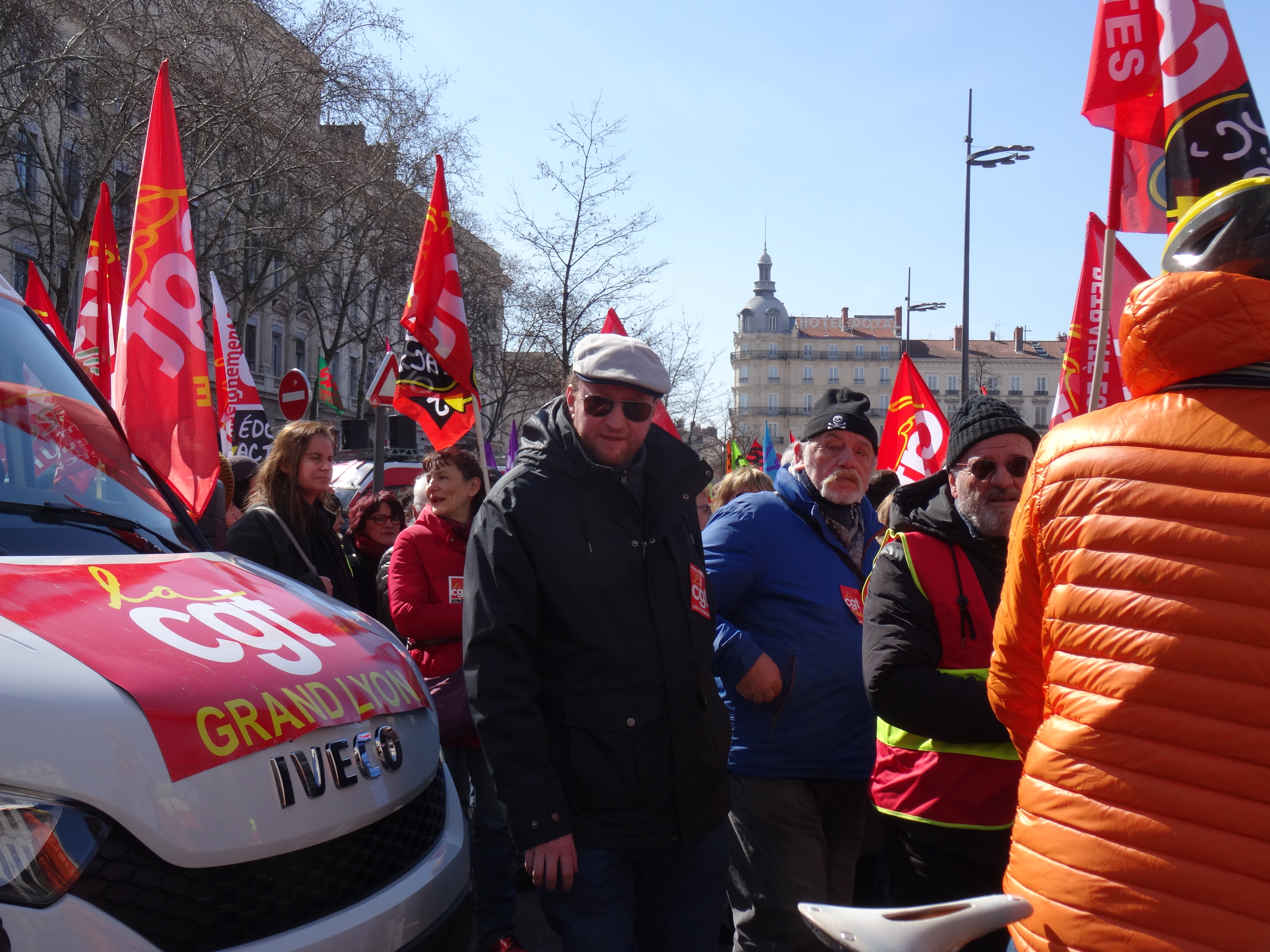
Protest in France against encroaching privatization and the introduction of profit-seeking practices in the public sector. (22 March 2018)

There is a semantic debate pertaining to whether public–private partnerships constitute privatization or not. Some argue that it isn't "privatization" because the government retains ownership of the facility and/or remains responsible for public service delivery. Others argue that they exist on a continuum of privatization, P3s being a more limited form of privatization than the outright sale of public assets, but more extensive than simply contracting out government services.

Because "privatization" has a negative connotation in some circles, supporters of P3s generally take the position that P3s do not constitute privatization, while P3 opponents argue that they do. The Canadian Union of Public Employees describes P3s as "privatization by stealth".

== Origins ==
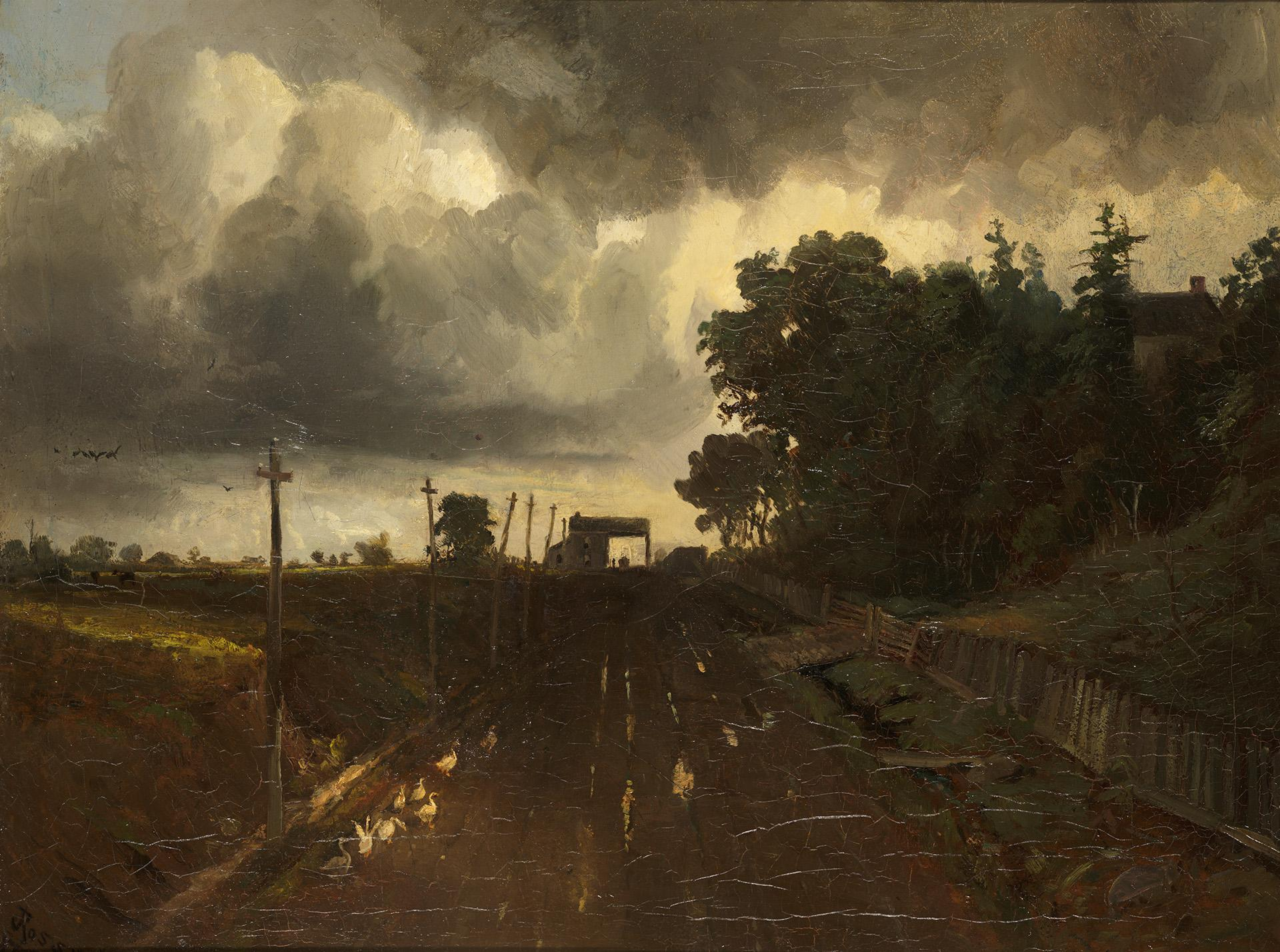
Second Toll Gate on Yonge Street in 1886

Governments have used such a mix of public and private endeavors throughout history.

Muhammad Ali of Egypt utilized "concessions" in the early 1800s to obtain public works for minimal cost while the concessionaires' companies made most of the profits from projects such as railroads and dams. Much of the early infrastructure of the United States was built by what can be considered public–private partnerships. This includes the Philadelphia and Lancaster Turnpike road in Pennsylvania, which was initiated in 1792, an early steamboat line between New York and New Jersey in 1808; many of the railroads, including the nation's first railroad, chartered in New Jersey in 1815; and most of the modern electric grid. In Newfoundland, Robert Gillespie Reid contracted to operate the railways for fifty years from 1898, though originally they were to become his property at the end of the period.

The late 20th and early 21st century saw a clear trend toward governments across the globe making greater use of various PPP arrangements. Pressure to change the model of public procurement was associated with the neoliberal turn. Instigators of the policy portrayed PPPs as a solution to concerns about the growing level of public debt during the 1970s and 1980s. They sought to encourage private investment in infrastructure, initially on the basis of ideology and accounting fallacies arising from the fact that public accounts did not distinguish between recurrent and capital expenditures.

In 1992, the Conservative government of John Major in the United Kingdom introduced the private finance initiative (PFI), the first systematic program aimed at encouraging public–private partnerships. The 1992 program focused on reducing the public-sector borrowing requirement, although, as already noted, the effect on public accounts was largely illusory. Initially, the private sector was unenthusiastic about PFI, and the public sector was opposed to its implementation. In 1993, the Chancellor of the Exchequer described its progress as "disappointingly slow". To help promote and implement the policy, Major created institutions staffed with people linked with the City of London, accountancy and consultancy firms who had a vested interest in the success of PFI.

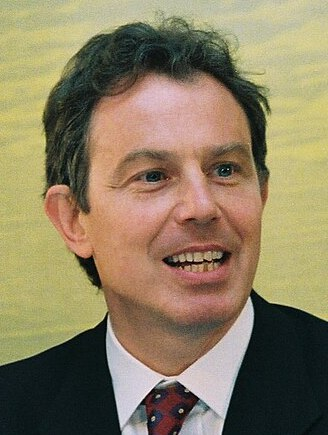
During his first term in office, Tony Blair made public-private partnerships the norm for government procurement projects in the United Kingdom.

Around the same time, PPPs were being initiated haphazardly in various OECD countries. The first governments to implement them were ideologically neoliberal and short on revenues: they were thus politically and fiscally inclined to try out alternative forms of public procurement. These early PPP projects were usually pitched by wealthy and politically connected business magnates. This explains why each countries experimenting with PPPs started in different sectors. At that time, PPPs were seen as a radical reform of government service provision.

In 1997, the new British government of Tony Blair's Labour Party expanded the PFI but sought to shift the emphasis to the achievement of "value for money", mainly through an appropriate allocation of risk. Blair created Partnerships UK (PUK), a new semi-independent organization to replace the previous pro-PPP government institutions. Its mandate was to promote and implement PFI. PUK was central in making PPPs the "new normal" for public infrastructure procurements in the country. Multiple countries subsequently created similar PPP units based on PUK's model.

While initiated in first world countries, PPPs immediately received significant attention in developing countries. This is because the PPP model promised to bring new sources of funding for infrastructure projects in transition economies, which could translate into jobs and economic growth. However, the lack of investor rights guarantees, commercial confidentiality laws, and dedicated state spending on public infrastructure in these countries made the implementation of public–private partnership in transition economies difficult. PPPs in the countries usually can't rely on stable revenues from user fees either. The World Bank's Public-Private Infrastructure Advisory Forum attempts to mitigate these challenges.

== Funding ==
A defining aspect of many infrastructure P3s is that most of the up-front financing is made through the private sector. The way this financing is done differs significantly by country. For P3s in the UK, bonds are used rather than bank loans. In Canada, P3 projects usually use loans that must be repaid within five years, and the projects are refinanced at a later date. In some types of public–private partnership, the cost of using the service is borne exclusively by the users of the service, for example, by toll road users such as in the case of Toronto's Yonge Street at the dawn of the 19th century, and the more recent Highway 407 in Ontario. In other types (notably the PFI), capital investment is made by the private sector on the basis of a contract with the government to provide agreed-on services, and the cost of providing the services is borne wholly or in part by the government.

=== Special purpose vehicle ===
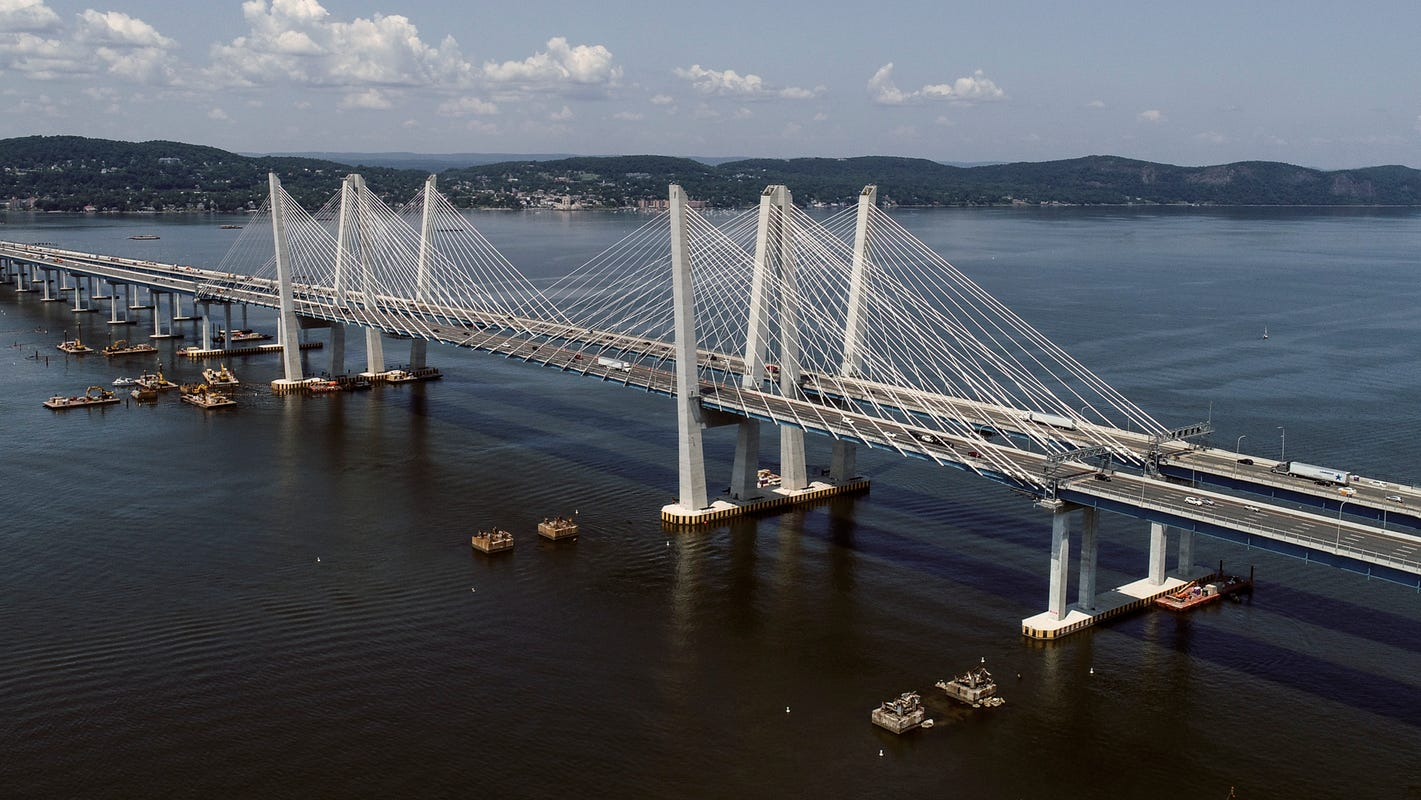
One year after the completion of the Mario Cuomo Bridge PPP, dozens of bolts holding its steel girders together had already failed. A whistleblower claims that the SPV responsible for its construction had knowingly delivered many defective high-strength bolts, and taken measures to hide evidence of the defects.

Typically, a private-sector consortium forms a special company called a special-purpose vehicle (SPV) to develop, build, maintain, and operate the asset for the contracted period. In cases where the government has invested in the project, it is typically (but not always) allotted an equity share in the SPV. The consortium is usually made up of a building contractor, a maintenance company, and one or more equity investors. The two former are typically equity holders in the project, who make decisions but are only repaid when the debts are paid, while the latter is the project's creditor (debt holder).

It is the SPV that signs the contract with the government and with subcontractors to build the facility and then maintain it. A typical PPP example would be a hospital building financed and constructed by a private developer and then leased to the hospital authority. The private developer then acts as landlord, providing housekeeping and other non-medical services, while the hospital itself provides medical services.

The SPV links the firms responsible of the building phase and the operating phase together. Hence there is a strong incentives in the building stage to make investments with regard to the operating stage. These investments can be desirable but may also be undesirable (e.g., when the investments not only reduce operating costs but also reduce service quality).

=== Financial partners ===
Public infrastructure is a relatively low-risk, high-reward investment, and combining it with complex arrangements and contracts that guarantee and secure the cash flows make PPP projects prime candidates for project financing. The equity investors in SPVs are usually institutional investors such as pension funds, life insurance companies, sovereign wealth and superannuation funds, and banks. Major P3 investors include AustralianSuper, OMERS and Dutch state-owned bank ABN AMRO, which funded the majority of P3 projects in Australia. Wall Street firms have increased their interest in PPP since the 2008 financial crisis.

=== Government ===
Government sometimes make in kind contributions to a PPP, notably with the transfer of existing assets. In projects that are aimed at creating public goods, like in the infrastructure sector, the government may provide a capital subsidy in the form of a one-time grant so as to make the project economically viable. In other cases, the government may support the project by providing revenue subsidies, including tax breaks or by guaranteed annual revenues for a fixed period.

=== Risks ===
Within public-private partnerships (PPPs), there are various risks associated. One risk common within PPPs is the lack of proper or accurate cost evaluation. Oftentimes the estimated costs of a project will not properly account for delays or unexpected events, leading to the costs to be larger than what was projected. Another risk within this area is with change of governance from differing political representatives could lead to projects being diminished or reduction of the allocated budget. This is common within PPPs as different political actors are likely to scrutinise their opponents based on their ideological positions.

=== Profits ===
Private monopolies created by PPPs can generate a rent-seeking behavior, which leads to spiraling costs for users and/or taxpayers in the operation phase of the project.

Some public–private partnerships, when the development of new technologies is involved, include profit-sharing agreements. This generally involves splitting revenues between the inventor and the public once a technology is commercialized. Profit-sharing agreements may stand over a fixed period of time or in perpetuity.

== P3 justifications ==
Using PPPs have been justified in various ways over time. Advocates generally argue that PPPs enable the public sector to harness the expertise and efficiencies that the private sector can bring to the delivery of certain facilities and services traditionally procured and delivered by the public sector. On the other hand, critics suggest that PPPs are part of an ideological program that seeks to privatize public services for the profits of private entities.

=== Off-balance-sheet accounting ===
PPPs are often structured so that borrowing for the project does not appear on the balance sheet of the public-sector body seeking to make a capital investment. Rather, the borrowing is incurred by the private-sector vehicle implementing the project, with or without an explicit backup guarantee of the loan by the public body. On PPP projects where the cost of using the service is intended to be borne exclusively by the end-user, or through a lease billed to the government every year during the operation phase of the project, the PPP is, from the public sector's perspective, an "off-balance sheet" method of financing the delivery of new or refurbished public-sector assets.

This justification was particularly important during the 1990s, but has been exposed as an accounting trick designed to make the government of the day appear more fiscally responsible, while offloading the costs of their projects to service users or future governments. In Canada, many auditors general have condemned this practice, and forced governments to include PPP projects "on-balance sheet".

On PPP projects where the public sector intends to compensate the private sector through availability payments once the facility is established or renewed, the financing is, from the public sector's perspective, "on-balance sheet". According to PPP advocates, the public sector will regularly benefit from significantly deferred cash flows. This viewpoint has been contested through research that shows that a majority of PPP projects ultimately cost significantly more than traditional public ones.

In the European Union, the fact that PPP debt is not recorded as debt and remains largely "off-balance-sheet" has become a major concern. Indeed, keeping the PPP project and its contingent liabilities "off balance sheet" means that the true cost of the project is hidden. According to the International Monetary Fund, economic ownership of the asset should determine whether to record PPP-related assets and liabilities in the government's or the private corporation's balance sheet is not straightforward.

=== Project costs ===
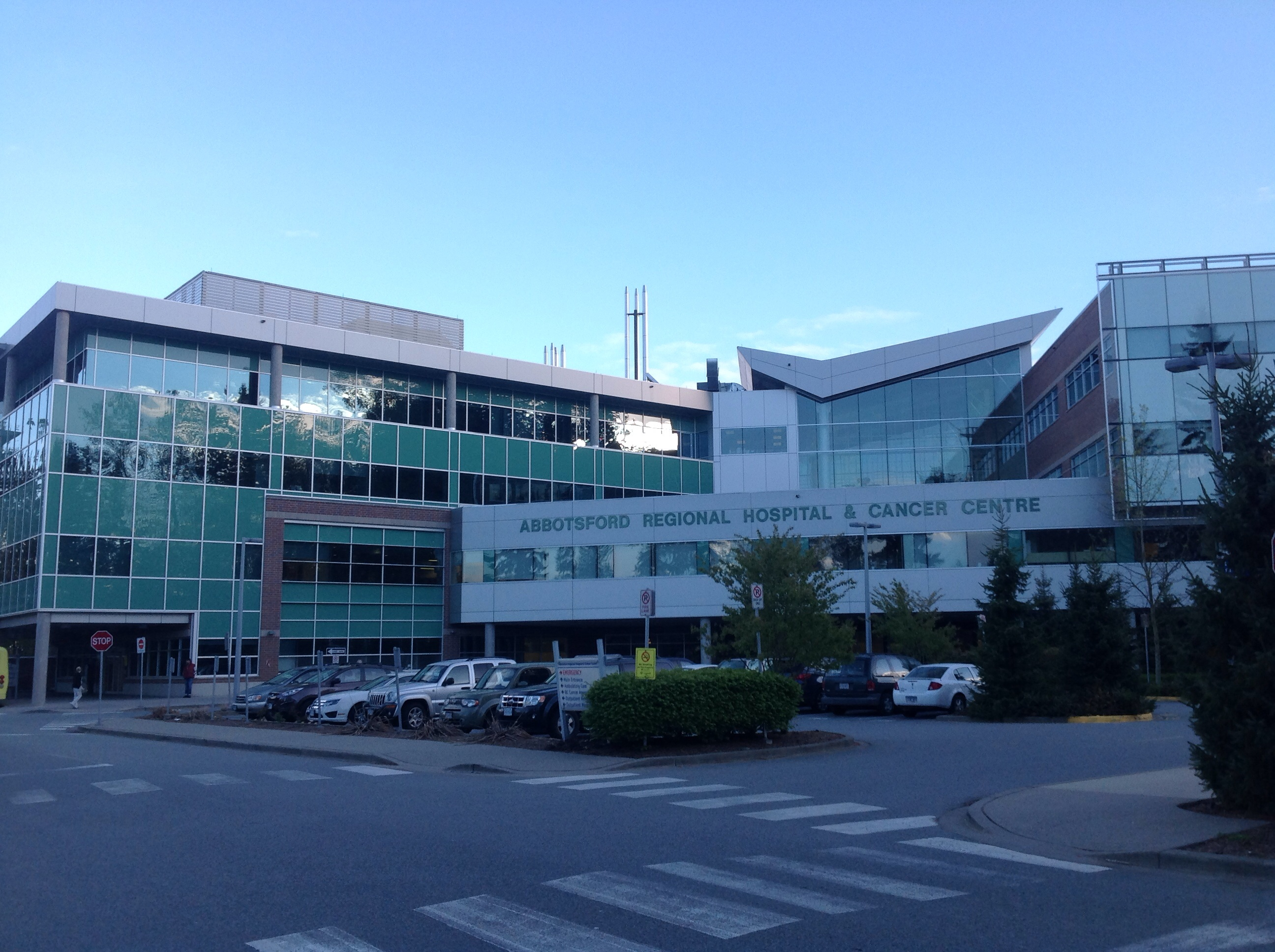
A discredited 2001 report by PricewaterhouseCoopers predicted that building the Abbotsford Regional Hospital & Cancer Centre (pictured) through a PPP would lead to cost savings of 1% at best. This option was selected, and then the projected construction costs increased by 68% over the course of PPP contract negotiations that lasted two years.

The effectiveness of PPPs as cost-saving venture has been refuted by numerous studies. Research has showed that on average, governments pay more for PPPs projects than for traditional publicly financed projects. The higher cost of P3s is attributed to these systemic factors:

- The private sector's higher cost of capital: governments can typically borrow capital at an interest rate lower than any private company ever could. This is because governments have the power of taxation, which guarantees that they will be able to repay their debts. Since lending to governments almost always come at a lower risk than lending to private entities, governments get better credit and cheaper financing costs for building large infrastructure projects than private finance.
- Transaction costs: P3 contracts are much more complex and extensive than contracts made in traditional publicly financed projects. The negotiation of these contracts require the presence of lawyers on all sides of the table and can take months or even years to finalize. Barrie Mckenna reports that "transaction costs for lawyers and consultants [in P3s] add about 3 percent to the final bill."
- Operating profits: Private companies that engage in P3s expect a return on investment after the completion of the project. By financing PPPs, they partner engages in low-risk speculation. Over the course of the contract, the private partner can charge the end-users and/or the government for more money than the cost of the initial investment.

Sometimes, private partners manage to overcome these costs and provide a project cheaper for taxpayers. This can be done by cutting corners, designing the project so as to be more profitable in the operational phase, charging user fees, and/or monetizing aspects of the projects not covered by the contract. For P3 schools in Nova Scotia, this latter aspect has included restricting the use of schools' fields and interior walls, and charging after-hours facility access to community groups at 10 times the rate of non-P3 schools.

In Ontario, a 2012 review of 28 projects showed that the costs were on average 16% lower for traditional publicly procured projects than for PPPs. A 2014 report by the Auditor General of Ontario said that the province overpaid by $8 billion through PPPs.

=== Value for money ===
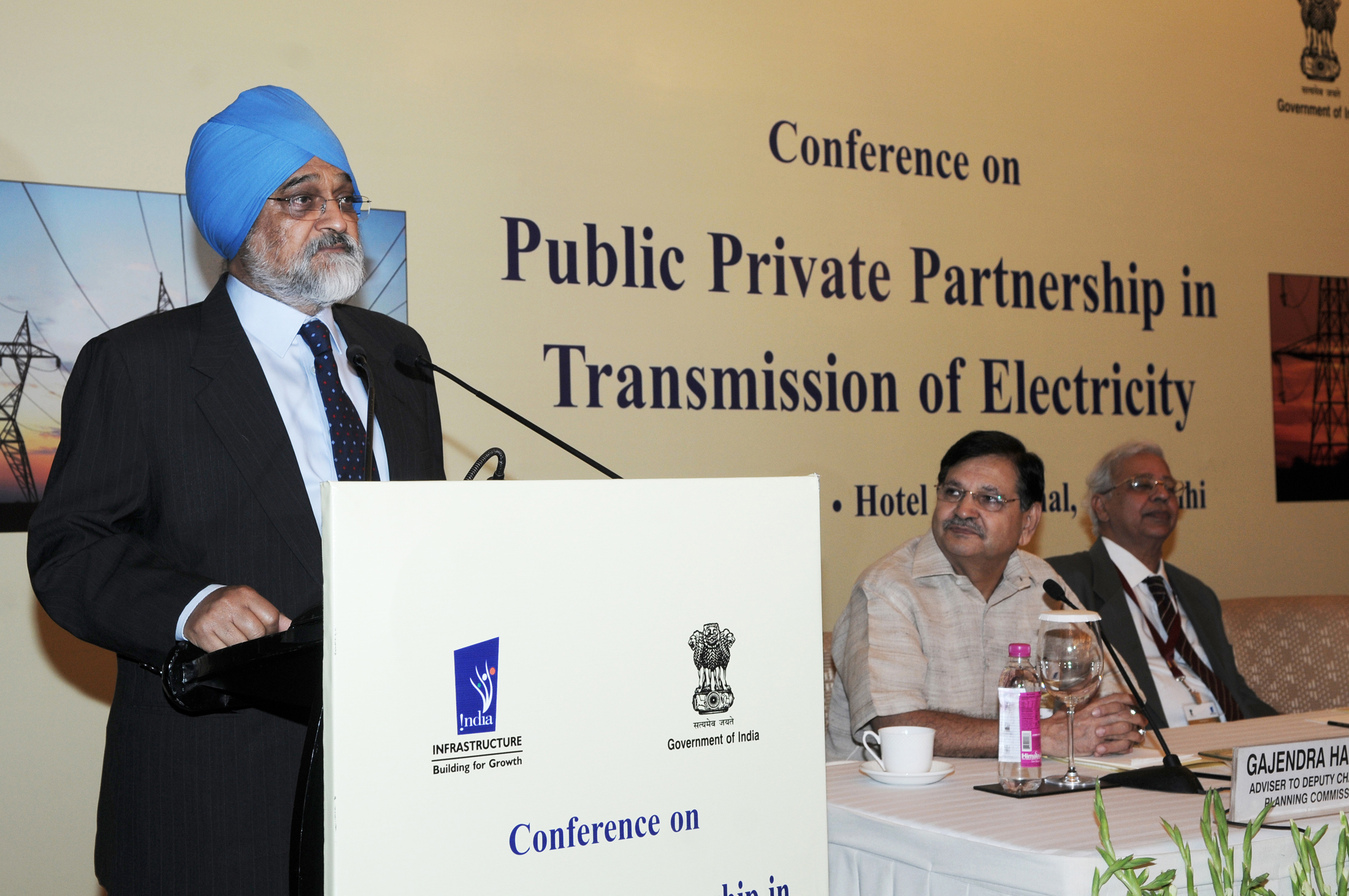
The Deputy Chairman, Planning Commission, Shri Montek Singh Ahluwalia delivering the Keynote Address at the inauguration of the conference on Public Private Partnership in transmission of electricity, in New Delhi. (2010)

In response to these negative findings about the costs and quality of P3 projects, proponents developed formal procedures for the assessment of PPPs which focused heavily on value for money. Heather Whiteside defines P3 "Value for money" as:

Not to be confused with lower overall project costs, value for money is a concept used to evaluate P3 private-partner bids against a hypothetical public sector comparator designed to approximate the costs of a fully public option (in terms of design, construction, financing, and operations). P3 value for money calculations consider a range of costs, the exact nature of which has changed over time and varies by jurisdiction. One thing that does remain consistent, however, is the favoring of "risk transfer" to the private partner, to the detriment of the public sector comparator.

Value for money assessment procedures were incorporated into the PFI and its Australian and Canadian counterparts beginning in the late 1990s and early 2000s. A 2012 study showed that value-for-money frameworks were still inadequate as an effective method of evaluating PPP proposals. The problem is that it is unclear what the catchy term "value-for-money" means in the technical details relating to their practical implementation. A Scottish auditor once qualified this use of the term as "technocratic mumbo-jumbo".

Project promoters often contract a PPP unit or one of the Big Four accounting firms to conduct the value for money assessments. Because these firms also offer PPP consultancy services, they have a vested interest in recommending the PPP option over the traditional public procurement method. The lack of transparency surrounding individual PPP projects makes it difficult to draft independent value-for-money assessments.

A number of Australian studies of early initiatives to promote private investment in infrastructure concluded that in most cases, the schemes being proposed were inferior to the standard model of public procurement based on competitively tendered construction of publicly owned assets. In 2009, the New Zealand Treasury, in response to inquiries by the new National Party government, released a report on PPP schemes that concluded that "there is little reliable empirical evidence about the costs and benefits of PPPs" and that there "are other ways of obtaining private sector finance", as well as that "the advantages of PPPs must be weighed against the contractual complexities and rigidities they entail".

In the United Kingdom, many private finance initiative programs ran dramatically over budget and have not provided value for money for the taxpayer, with some projects costing more to cancel than to complete. An in-depth study conducted by the National Audit Office of the United Kingdom concluded that the private finance initiative model had proved to be more expensive and less efficient in supporting hospitals, schools, and other public infrastructure than public financing. A treasury select committee stated that 'PFI was no more efficient than other forms of borrowing and it was "illusory" that it shielded the taxpayer from risk'.

=== Transfer of risk ===
One of the main rationales for P3s is that they provide for a transfer of risk: the private partner assumes the risks in case of cost overruns or project failures. Methods for assessing value-for-money rely heavily on risk transfers to show the superiority of P3s. However, P3s do not inherently reduce risk, they simply reassign who is responsible, and the private sector assumes that risk at a cost for the taxpayer. If the value of the risk transfer is appraised too high, then the government is overpaying for P3 projects.

Incidentally, a 2018 UK Parliament report underlines that some private investors have made large returns from PPP deals, suggesting that departments are overpaying for transferring the risks of projects to the private sector, one of the Treasury's stated benefits of PPP.

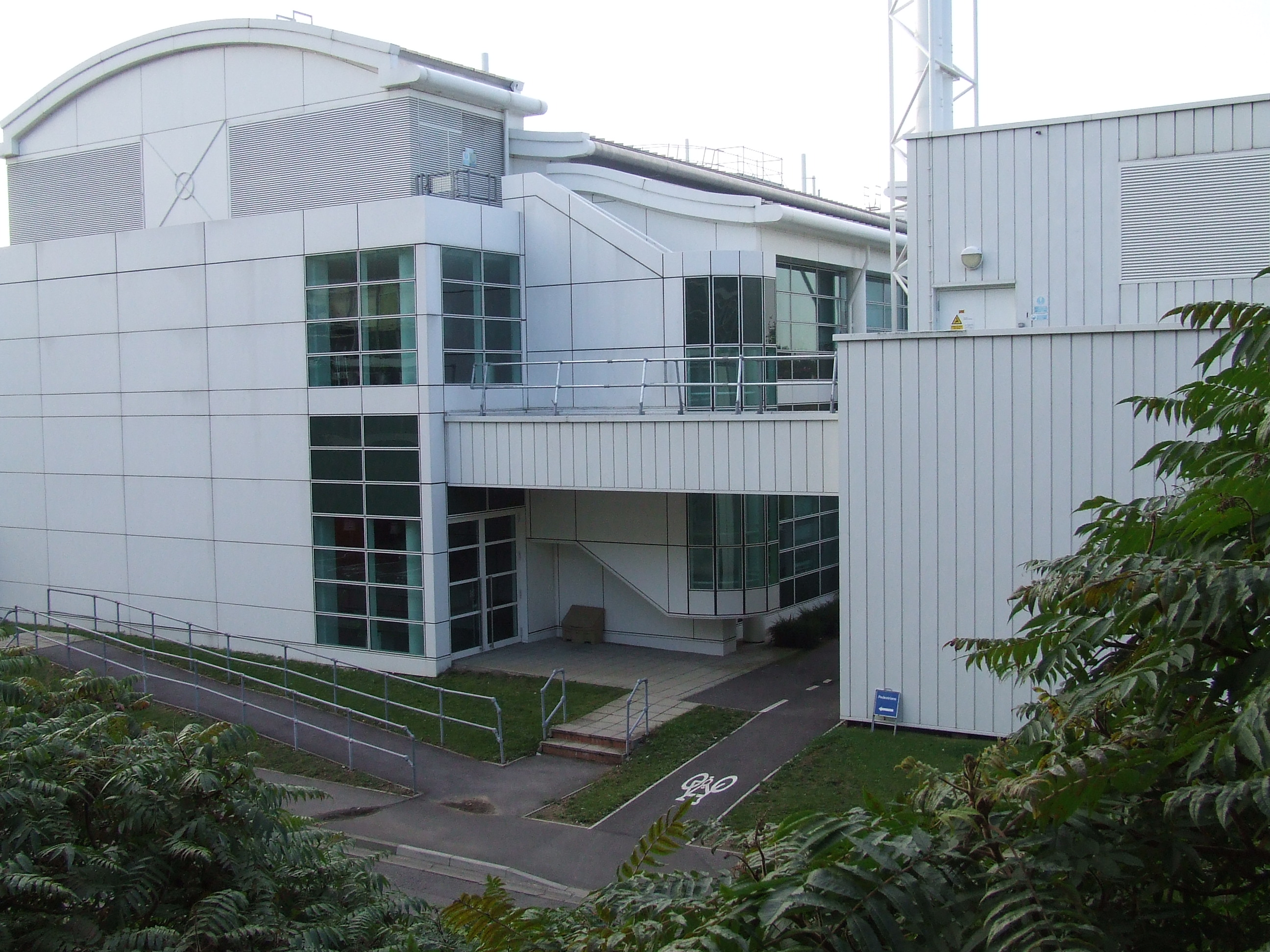
The maintenance of the new National Physical Laboratory building was transferred back to the British Department of Trade and Industry in 2004 after the private sector partners involved in the PFI contract made losses of over £100m.

Supporters of P3s claim that risk is successfully transferred from public to private sectors as a result of P3, and that the private sector is better at risk management. As an example of successful risk transfer, they cite the case of the National Physical Laboratory. This deal ultimately caused the collapse of the building contractor Laser (a joint venture between Serco and John Laing) when the cost of the complex scientific laboratory, which was ultimately built, was very much larger than estimated.

On the other hand, Allyson Pollock argues that in many PFI projects risks are not in fact transferred to the private sector and, based on the research findings of Pollock and others, George Monbiot argues that the calculation of risk in PFI projects is highly subjective, and is skewed to favor the private sector:

When private companies take on a PFI project, they are deemed to acquire risks the state would otherwise have carried. These risks carry a price, which proves to be remarkably responsive to the outcome you want. A paper in the British Medical Journal shows that before risk was costed, the hospital schemes it studied would have been built much more cheaply with public funds. After the risk was costed, they all tipped the other way; in several cases by less than 0.1%.

Following an incident in the Royal Infirmary of Edinburgh where surgeons were forced to continue a heart operation in the dark following a power cut caused by PFI operating company Consort, Dave Watson from Unison criticized the way the PFI contract operates:

It's a costly and inefficient way of delivering services. It's meant to mean a transfer of risk, but when things go wrong the risk stays with the public sector and, at the end of the day, the public because the companies expect to get paid. The health board should now be seeking an exit from this failed arrangement with Consort and at the very least be looking to bring facilities management back in-house.

Furthermore, assessments ignore the practices of risk transfers to contractors under traditional procurement methods. As for the idea that the private sector is inherently better at managing risk, there has been no comprehensive study comparing risk management by the public sector and by P3s. Auditor Generals of Quebec, Ontario and New Brunswick have publicly questioned P3 rationales based on a transfer of risk, the latter stating he was "unable to develop any substantive evidence supporting risk transfer decisions". Furthermore, many PPP concessions proved to be unstable and required to be renegotiated to favor the contractor.

== Digital public–private partnerships ==
Public–private cooperation in the digital sphere includes the development of services, platforms, and infrastructure that depend on the exchange and use of digital resources. These arrangements are studied as digital public–private partnerships (DPPPs). Research examines how relationships between participants are organized, alongside questions of public value creation, accountability, and public participation.

DPPPs have been defined as “hybrid forms of cooperation that are not primarily based on capital and infrastructure services, but rather on the joint flow and productive use or utilisation of digital resources such as data, algorithms and computing capacity, thereby creating a mutual empowerment of the public and private sectors that balances public value creation, private innovation and regulatory legitimacy.”

=== Scope and conceptual distinctions ===
Data, algorithms, and computing capacity are central resources in DPPPs. Areas examined in the literature include healthcare, mobility, energy, and digital identity and trust systems. The concept therefore extends across several sectors.

The term digital refers to the subject matter of the cooperation and its governance requirements. The conceptual distinction concerns the management of shared resources and the joint development of solutions, rather than a particular contractual or financing arrangement.

=== Organization and continuity ===
One question examined in the literature is how these partnerships can continue beyond individual projects. From this perspective, cooperation may be organized around long-term platform infrastructures that combine economic, social, and institutional objectives. This approach has been discussed in research on the development of public–private partnerships based on digital resources and technologies.

Proposed organizational arrangements include federated platforms, data trusts, and multilevel governance structures. Their design raises questions about the allocation of responsibilities, access to resources, and coordination between organizations. Common standards and interoperable interfaces are intended to support the reuse, expansion, and maintenance of digital solutions beyond the initial collaboration.

=== ADMIT framework ===
The ADMIT framework is a conceptual framework for analyzing and informing the design of DPPPs, particularly in regulated settings. It groups the conditions for cooperation into five dimensions: governance, data and trust, shared objectives, innovation capabilities, and experimentation. The acronym derives from the names of these dimensions.

The first dimension, Adaptive, Layered Innovation Governance, concerns how decision-making responsibilities are allocated and decisions reviewed. It combines hierarchical responsibilities, network-based cooperation, and platform-based coordination. Periodic adjustments to decisions are intended to accommodate technological change while maintaining legal requirements and public oversight. The second dimension, Data Governance, Interoperability, and Trust, addresses the conditions for data exchange, including access and usage rights, responsibilities, standards, and interfaces. Trust is understood as depending on a combination of technical security, legal clarity, and organizational transparency.

The third dimension, Making Missions Work: Joint Mission Framing and Innovation Alignment, examines the formulation of a shared strategic direction. Its purpose is to connect public-interest objectives with private partners’ innovation activities and translate them into specific actions, measurable goals, and verifiable processes. The fourth dimension, Innovation Capabilities and Absorptive Capacity, concerns the capabilities needed to put that direction into practice. It encompasses the technical expertise, organizational structures, and cultural conditions that enable participants to absorb external knowledge, combine it with existing resources, and turn it into workable solutions.

The fifth dimension, Taking Risks: Incentivising Risk-Taking and Regulatory Experimentation, addresses opportunities to test new solutions in regulated environments. It includes risk sharing, incentives for innovation, and regulatory experimentation. The approach links experimentation to legal accountability and the protection of public interests.

These dimensions are treated as interrelated conditions. Compatible interfaces, for example, need to be accompanied by clear rules governing their use and organizations capable of making use of shared data. Similarly, common objectives require decision-making arrangements, resources, and learning processes that support their implementation. The framework's analytical purpose is to examine these conditions and their relationships together.

When applied to an existing or planned partnership, the framework provides a structure for qualitatively assessing governance adaptability, data management, the alignment of objectives, participants’ capabilities, and the conditions for experimentation. It offers an analytical framework and design principles rather than a standardized evaluation method with predefined indicators, weights, or thresholds.

=== Public oversight and research questions ===
The shared management of digital resources raises questions about control and the distribution of power. Dependence on technology providers and differences in partners’ capabilities may limit the autonomy of public-sector participants. Further questions concern who determines how data are used, how activities are monitored, and to whom participating organizations are accountable. These concerns connect with debates about transparency and democratic accountability in conventional public–private partnerships.

A bibliometric review of DPPP research identifies a stronger emphasis on management and performance than on distributive justice, accountability, and participation. It calls for closer integration of digital governance and public values approaches to broaden the criteria used to analyze these partnerships.

== Accountability and transparency ==
One of the main criticisms of public–private partnerships is the lack of accountability and transparency associated with these projects. Part of the reason why evidence of PPP performance is often unavailable is that most financial details of P3s are under the veil of commercial confidentiality provisions, and unavailable to researchers and the public. Around the world, opponents of P3s have launched judicial procedures to access greater P3 project documentation than the limited "bottom line" sheets available on the project's websites. When they are successful, the documents they receive are often heavily redacted.

A 2007 survey of U.S. city managers revealed that communities often fail to sufficiently monitor PPPs: "For instance, in 2002, only 47.3% of managers involved with private firms as delivery partners reported that they evaluate that service delivery. By 2007, that was down to 45.4%. Performance monitoring is a general concern from these surveys and in the scholarly criticisms of these arrangements."

== Sectors ==
=== Water services ===
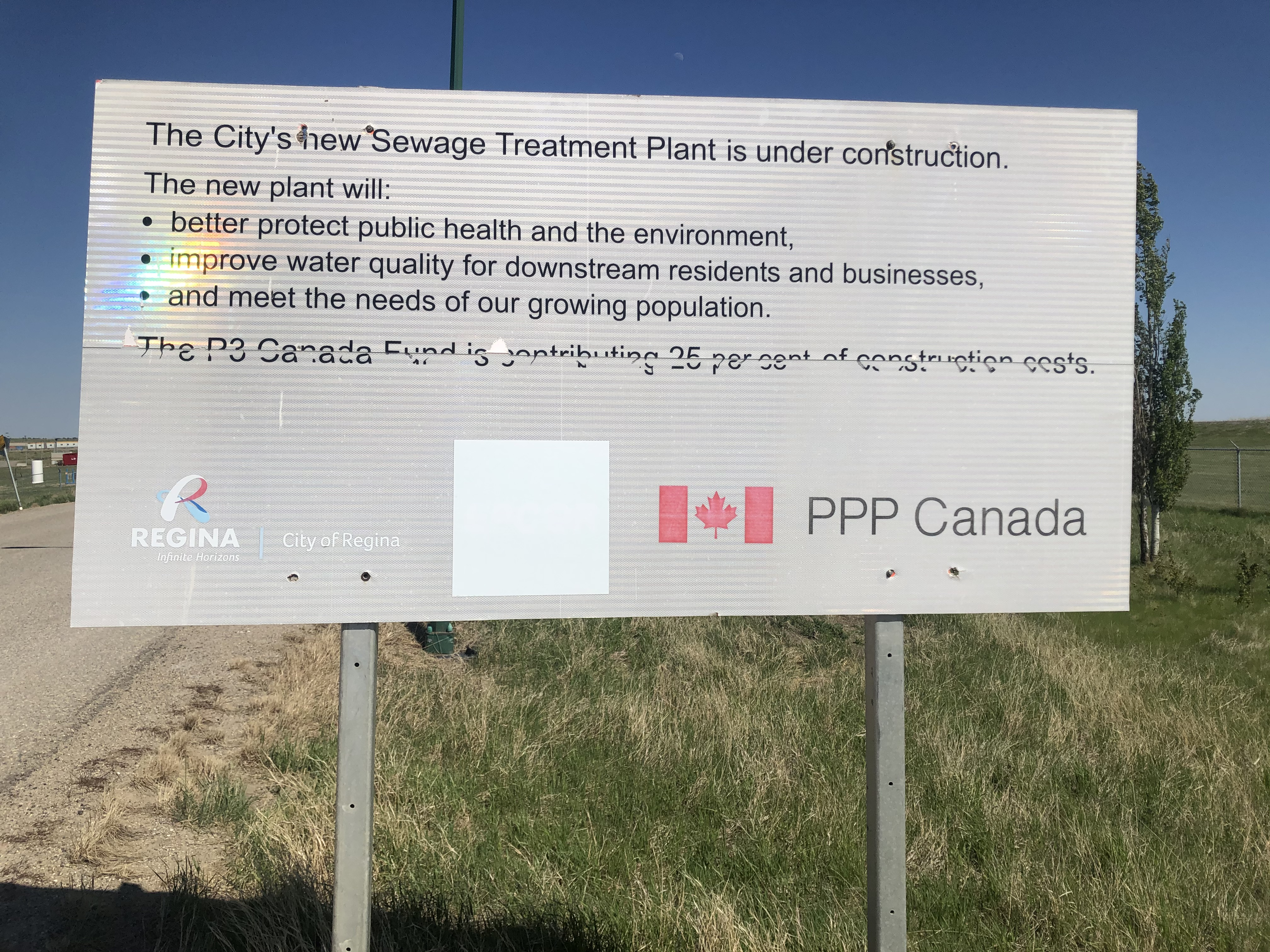
Sign at the entrance of the Regina Wastewater Treatment Plant

After a wave of privatization of many water services in the 1990s, mostly in developing countries, experiences show that global water corporations have not brought the promised improvements in public water utilities. Instead of lower prices, large volumes of investment, and improvements in the connection of the poor to water and sanitation, water tariffs have increased out of reach of poor households. Water multinationals are withdrawing from developing countries, and the World Bank is reluctant to provide support.

The privatization of the water services of the city of Paris proved to be unwanted, and at the end of 2009 the city did not renew its contract with two of the French water corporations, Suez and Veolia. After a year of being controlled by the public, it is projected that the water tariff will be cut by between 5% and 10%.

In the 2010s, as wastewater treatment plants across North America came of age and needed to be replaced, multiple cities decided to fund the renewal of their water infrastructure through a public–private partnership. Among those cities were Brandenburg, Kentucky, which was the "first local government in Kentucky to execute a public–private partnership under legislation passed in 2016", and Regina, Saskatchewan, which held a referendum on the plant's funding model. The P3 option won out."

=== Transportation ===
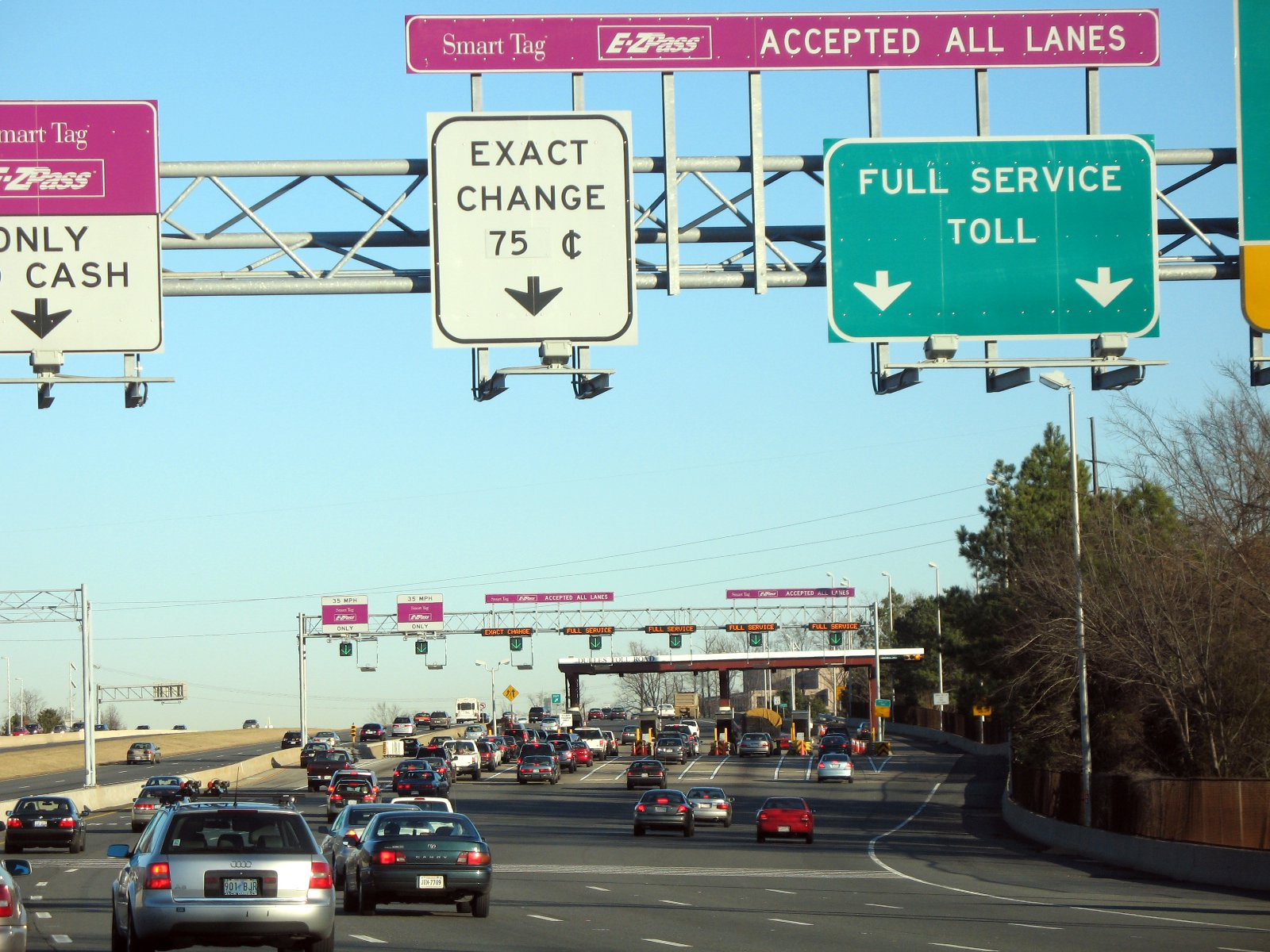
The main toll plaza of the Dulles Toll Road concession in Virginia, whose price is periodically increasing.

Another major sector for P3s is transportation. The P3 Transportation sector can be broadly split into five sectors: airports, ports, roads, railways and urban passenger transport (which includes bus, light rail and heavy rail systems).

Many P3s in the United States have been toll road concessions. Transportation projects have accounted for 1/5 of all P3 projects in Canada. Major transportation P3 projects have included the Confederation Bridge linking Prince Edward Island and New Brunswick, the Pocahontas Parkway in Virginia, and the London Underground PPP.

=== Health services ===
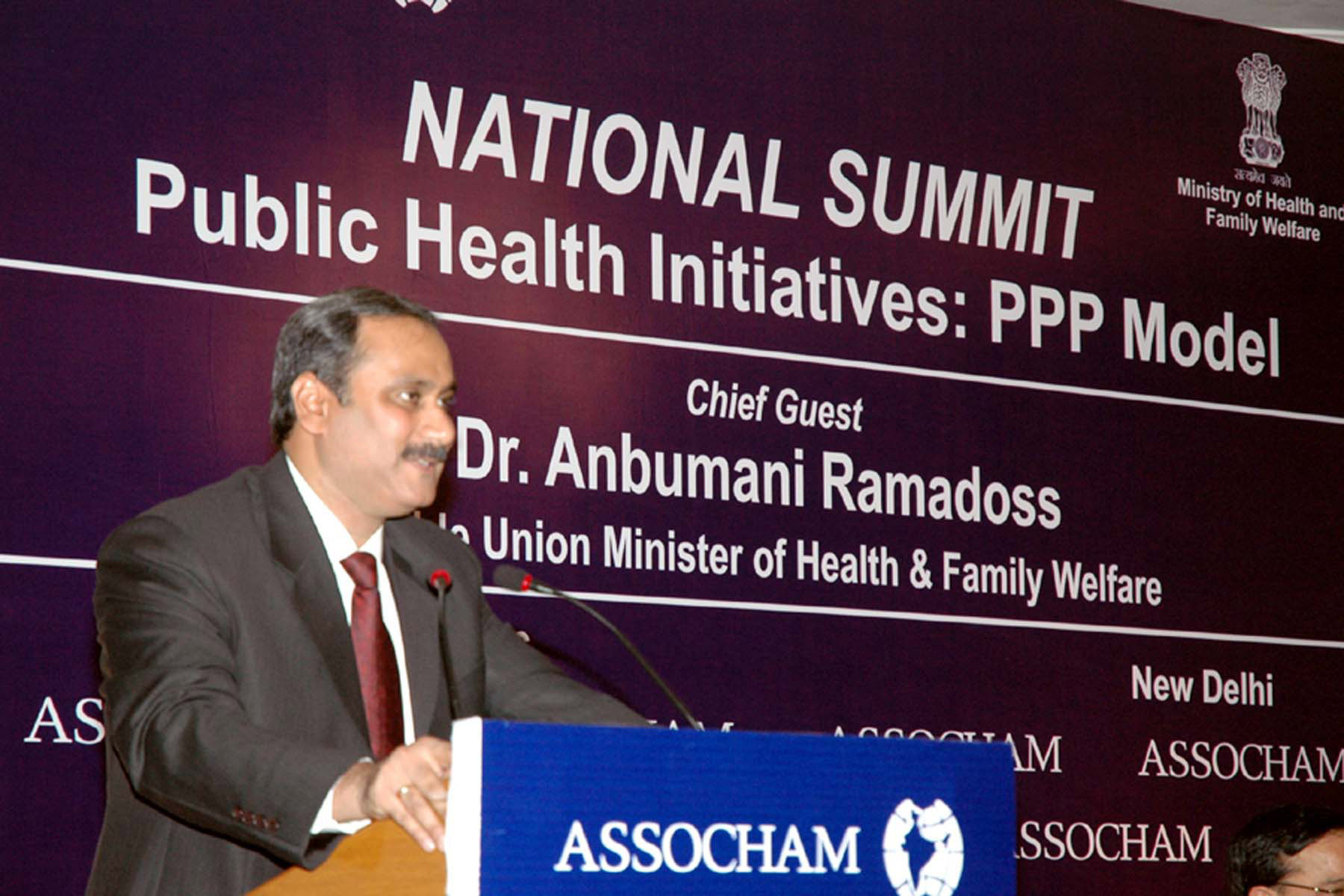
Indian Minister of Health and Family Welfare Anbumani Ramadoss addressing the inauguration of the Associate Chamber of Commerce & Industry National Summit on Public Health Initiatives and the PPP model, in New Delhi. (2006)

For more than two decades, public–private partnerships have been used to finance health infrastructure. In Canada, they comprise 1/3 of all P3 projects nationwide. Governments have looked to the PPP model in an attempt to solve larger problems in health care delivery. However, some health-care-related PPPs have been shown to cost significantly more money to develop and maintain than those developed through traditional public procurement.

A health services PPP can be described as a long-term contract (typically 15–30 years) between a public-sector authority and one or more private-sector companies operating as a legal entity. In theory, the agreements entails that the government provides purchasing power and outlines goals for an optimal health system. It then contracts a private enterprise to design, build, maintain, and/or manage the delivery of agreed-upon services over the term of the contract. Finally, the private sector receives payment for its services and assumes additional risk while benefitting from returns on its investments during the operational phase.

A criticism of P3s for Hospitals in Canada is that they result in an "internal bifurcation of authority". This occurs when the facility is operated and maintained by the private sector while the care services are delivered by the public sector. In those cases, the nursing staff cannot request their colleagues from the maintenance staff to clean something (urine, blood, etc.) or to hang workplace safety signs, even if they are standing next to each other, without the approval of the private managers.

In the UK, P3s were used to build hospitals for the National Health Service. In 2017 there were 127 PFI schemes in the English NHS. The contracts vary greatly in size. Most include the cost of running services such as facilities management, hospital portering and patient food, and these amount to around 40% of the cost. Total repayments will cost around £2.1 billion in 2017 and will reach a peak in 2029. This is around 2% of the NHS budget.

=== Education ===
Many PFI contracts were put in place for schools in England between 1998 and 2016. Typically these contracts typically run for 25 to 30 years. P3 contracts have also been used to construct and operate university student accommodation. PPP schemes have been used in the education field in the developing world.

=== Forestry sector ===
PPP options in the forest sector can include joint forest management projects between government agencies, various investors and NGOs. USAID promotes the use of P3s to assist the exploitation of certified timber and non-timber products in Third World countries by foreign companies. They claim forestry PPPs are an agent of nature conservation and the sustainable harvesting of commercialized forest products, notwithstanding the fact that it was competition from foreign companies that forced local producers to engage in unsustainable harvesting practices in the first place. Many forestry sector partnerships with NGOs are nothing more than greenwashing operations.

== Institutional support ==
Aside from the support of national governments and financial firms, PPPs are promoted by the following institutions:

=== PPP units ===
Public–private partnership units are organizations responsible for promoting, facilitating, and assessing P3s in their territory. They can be government agencies, or semi-independent organizations created with full or part government support. Governments tend to create these units as a response to criticisms of the implementation of P3 projects in their country prior to the creation of the P3 unit. In 2009, 50% of OECD countries had created a centralized PPP unit, and many more of these institutions exist in other countries.

=== Accounting firms ===
The "big four" accounting firms of PricewaterhouseCoopers, Deloitte, Ernst & Young, and KPMG have been involved in the public–private partnership model from its inception. Advisors from these companies have been tapped to develop PPP policies and procedures in multiple countries. These companies then went on to evaluate those procedures, appraise individual projects, and act as a consultants for private and public partners in PPP contract negotiations. Accounting firms sometimes even have an equity stake in projects that they appraise the value for money. Due to these conflict of interests, multiple authors have argues that the "big four"'s public project appraisals are biased towards the PPP funding option against the traditional procurement model.

=== International institutions ===
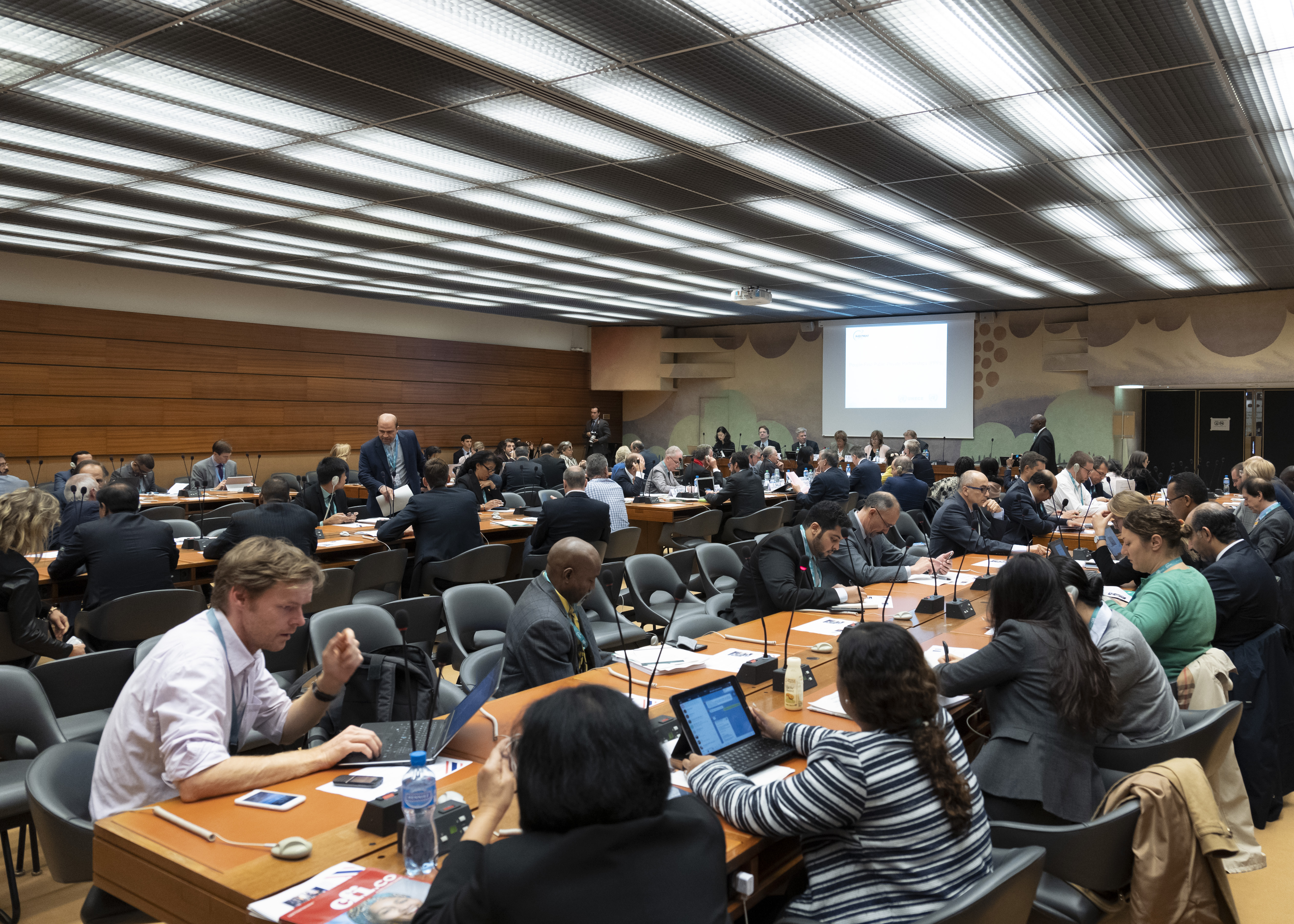
Participants of People-First Public-Private Partnerships during the World Investment Forum 2018

United Nations and the World Bank works to promote public–private partnerships in countries where it operates. The United Nations' Sustainable Development Goal 17 target 17.17 is formulated as: "Encourage effective partnerships: Encourage and promote effective public, public–private and civil society partnerships, building on the experience and resourcing strategies of partnerships." The success of this target is measured by the amount in United States dollars committed to public–private partnerships for infrastructure worldwide.

Public-Private Partnerships (PPPs) are described by Tiziano Peccia and collaborators as important instruments for advancing the Sustainable Development Goals (SDGs) established by the United Nations (UN). Their research argues that PPPs facilitate cooperation between governments, private companies, scientific institutions, and civil society by mobilizing resources, innovation, and technical expertise for sustainable development. The authors also emphasize that effective implementation of the SDGs requires “capillary approaches”, connecting local initiatives with global governance structures through science diplomacy and decentralized international cooperation.

According to Peccia et al., the United Nations plays a central coordinating role in achieving the SDGs through multilevel cooperation among public institutions, the private sector, academia, and local communities. PPPs are presented as strategic tools capable of accelerating sustainable development by combining public legitimacy with private-sector innovation and investment capacity. The authors argue that the UN should also function as a facilitator linking grassroots initiatives and local scientific networks with international policy frameworks in order to strengthen inclusive and sustainable global governance.

However, Peccia et al. also underline the importance of monitoring Public-Private Partnerships to avoid risks such as “bluewashing” and “private washing”, where private actors may use association with the United Nations or the Sustainable Development Goals mainly for reputational benefit rather than genuine sustainable impact. They argue that transparent evaluation, accountability mechanisms, ethical oversight, and continuous monitoring are necessary to ensure that PPPs remain aligned with public interest, social inclusion, and the effective implementation of the SDGs.

=== United States foreign policy ===
The American government seeks to promote public–private partnerships around the globe to meet its various foreign policy goals. USAID promoted PPPs with Global Development Alliances and through the Development Credit Authority, which was merged into the Overseas Private Investment Corporation in 2019. The State department also promotes PPPs through its Office of Global Partnerships.

== Delivery models ==
There are many types and delivery models of PPPs, the following is a non-exhaustive list of some of the designs:

Operation and maintenance contract (O & M)
A private economic agent, under a government contract, operates a publicly-owned asset for a specific period of time. Formal, ownership of the asset remains with the public entity. In terms of private-sector risk and involvement, this model is on the lower end of the spectrum for both involvement and risk.

Build–finance (BF)
The private actor builds the asset and finances the cost during the construction period, afterwards the responsibility is handed over to the public entity. In terms of private-sector risk and involvement, this model is again on the lower end of the spectrum for both measures.

Build–operate–transfer (BOT)
Build–operate–transfer represents a complete integration of the project delivery: the same contract governs the design, construction, operations, maintenance, and financing of the project. After some concessionary period, the facility is transferred back to the owner.

Build–own–operate–transfer (BOOT)
A BOOT structure differs from BOT in that the private entity owns the works. During the concession period, the private company owns and operates the facility with the prime goal to recover the costs of investment and maintenance while trying to achieve a higher margin on the project. BOOT has been used in projects like highways, roads mass transit, railway transport and power generation.

Build–own–operate (BOO)
In a BOO project ownership of the project remains usually with the project company, such as a mobile phone network. Therefore, the private company gets the benefits of any residual value of the project. This framework is used when the physical life of the project coincides with the concession period. A BOO scheme involves large amounts of finance and long payback period. Some examples of BOO projects come from the water treatment plants.

Build–lease–transfer (BLT)
Under BLT, a private entity builds a complete project and leases it to the government. In this way the control over the project is transferred from the project owner to a lessee. In other words, the ownership remains by the shareholders but operation purposes are leased. After the expiry of the leasing the ownership of the asset and the operational responsibility is transferred to the government at a previously agreed price.

Design–build–finance–maintain (DBFM)
"The private sector designs, builds and finances an asset and provides hard facility management or maintenance services under a long-term agreement." The owner (usually the public sector) operates the facility. This model is in the middle of the spectrum for private sector risk and involvement.

Design–build–finance–maintain–operate (DBFMO)
Design–build–finance–operate is a project delivery method very similar to BOOT except that there is no actual ownership transfer. Moreover, the contractor assumes the risk of financing until the end of the contract period. The owner then assumes the responsibility for maintenance and operation. This model is extensively used in specific infrastructure projects such as toll roads. The private construction company is responsible for the design and construction of a piece of infrastructure for the government, which is the true owner. Moreover, the private entity has the responsibility to raise finance during the construction and the exploitation period. Usually, the public sector begins payments to the private sector for use of the asset post-construction. This is the most commonly used model in the EU according to the European Court of Auditors.

Design–build–operate–transfer (DBOT)
This funding option is common when the client has no knowledge of what the project entails. Hence they contracts the project to a company to design, build, operate, and then transfer it. Examples of such projects are refinery constructions.

Design–construct–manage–finance (DCMF)
A private entity is entrusted to design, construct, manage, and finance a facility, based on the specifications of the government. Project cash flows result from the government's payment for the rent of the facility. Some examples of the DCMF model are prisons or public hospitals.

Concession
A concession is a grant of rights, land or property by a government, local authority, corporation, individual or other legal entity. Public services such as water supply may be operated as a concession. In the case of a public service concession, a private company enters into an agreement with the government to have the exclusive right to operate, maintain and carry out investment in a public utility (such as a water privatization) for a given number of years.

Different Levels of Private sector engagement in PPP contracts
| Model | Identify Infrastructure Need | Propose solution | Project design | Project financing | Construction | Operation | Maintenance | Ownership | Concession? |
|---|---|---|---|---|---|---|---|---|---|
| Bid–build | Public sector | | | | Private sector | Public sector | | | No |
| Design–bid–build | Public sector | | Private sector | Public sector | Private sector | Public sector | | | No |
| Design–build | Public sector | | Private sector | Public sector | Private sector | Public sector | | | No |
| Design–build–finance | Public sector | | Private sector | | | Public sector | | | No |
| Design–build–finance–maintain | Public sector | | Private sector | | | Public sector | Private sector | Public sector | No |
| Design–build–finance–operate | Public sector | | Private sector | | | | Public sector | | No |
| Design–build–finance–maintain–operate | Public sector | | Private sector | | | | | Public sector | No |
| Build–finance | Public sector | | | Private sector | | Public sector | | | No |
| Operation & maintenance contract | ? | | | | | Private sector | | Public sector | No |
| Build-operate-transfer | Public sector | | Private sector | | | | | Public sector | Temporary |
| Build–lease–transfer | Public sector | | Private sector | | | Public sector | Private sector | | Temporary |
| Build–own–operate–transfer | Public sector | | Private sector | | | | | | Temporary |
| Build–own–operate | Public sector | | Private sector | | | | | | Yes |
| Market-led proposals | Private sector | | | | | | | Public sector | No |

== Other types ==
While long-term infrastructure projects compose the bulk of P3s worldwide, other types of Public–private partnerships exist to suit different purposes and actors.

=== Asset monetization ===
A form of P3 that became prevalent in American cities during the 21st century are asset monetization arrangements. They concerns a city's revenue-generating assets (parking lots, garage and meters, public lights, toll roads, etc.) and transforms them into financial assets that the city can lease to a private corporation in exchange for covering operation and maintenance. These deals are usually done during periods of financial distress for the city, and the immediate revenues municipalities receive is used to pay down the debt or to fill budget holes. The 2014 Detroit bankruptcy deal included many asset monetization arrangements.

=== Global public–private partnership ===
Global public–private partnership (GPPP) is a governance mechanism to foster public–private partnership (PPP) cooperation between an international intergovernmental organisation like the United Nations and private companies. Existing GPPPs strive, among other things, to increase affordable access to non-generic essential drugs and vaccines in developing countries, and to promote handwashing with soap to reduce diarrhoea.

=== Institutionalised public–private partnership ===
The European Commission issued an "interpretative communication" in 2008 regarding the establishment of institutionalised public–private partnerships (IPPP), whose formation generally involves simultaneously creating a new jointly owned public–private entity and the award of a public sector contract or concession whereby the new entity supplies goods or services to the public body or the general public. The Commission acknowledged that separating these two procedures, such that the selection of the private partner and the decision on whether to contract with the new entity were distinct processes, would not be practical, and therefore a "transparent and competitive procedure" through which the private partner was identified and the terms of their involvement in the institutionalised entity could be compliant with treaty obligations and public procurement law. The guidance also noted that, following the establishment of the IPPP entity, it would be free to bid for future public contracts in the same way as other businesses, but particular care would be needed to ensure that the award process remained transparent.

=== Market-led proposal ===
Market-led proposals (MLP) are P3s proposed by the private sector. MLP policies encourage private sector firms to make unsolicited P3 infrastructure project proposals to the government, instead of putting the onus on the state to propose each projects. During the 2010s, MLP policies were implemented in most Australian states and territories. Amy Sarcevic from Informa Australia notes that "to date, market-led proposals have had a relatively high failure rate".

=== Public–private–community partnerships ===
Public–private partnerships with non-profits and private partners, sometimes called Public–private–community partnerships (PPCPs), are a modified version of the PPP model designed for the needs of Third world countries. They were notably proposed by the Asian Development Bank as early as 1991 as an "institutional reform ... to facilitate the participation of individuals, CBOs [community based organizations], other NGOs and the private sector" so that they become "actively involved in planning and management".

=== Social impact bond ===
Social impact bonds (also called pay for success bonds) are "a public–private partnership which funds effective social services through a performance-based contract", according to Social Finance's definition. They operate over a fixed period of time, but they do not offer a fixed rate of return. Generally, repayment to investors is contingent upon a specified social outcome being achieved. A similar system, development impact bonds, is being implemented in developing countries.

== See also ==
- Privatization
- Public–private partnerships by country
- Industry funding of academic research
- Government procurement
- Top 100 Contractors of the U.S. federal government
- Sustainable procurement
- Build–operate–transfer
- Economic conversion
- Volume risk
