= 2015 Saga gubernatorial election =

Election for Governor of Saga Prefecture

- 11 January 2015
Nominee	Yoshinori Yamaguchi	Keisuke Hiwatashi	Yukihiro Shimatani
Party	Independent	Independent	Independent
Popular vote	182,795	143,720	32,844
Supported by		LDP, Komeito
Nominee	Yoshitaka Isagai
Party	Independent
Popular vote	6,951
Governor before election
Yasushi Furukawa
Independent
Elected Governor
Yoshinori Yamaguchi
Independent

The 2015 Saga gubernatorial election was held on 11 January 2015 to elect the Governor of Saga Prefecture. Newcomer Yoshinori Yamaguchi won the election.

== Candidates ==
- Yoshinori Yamaguchi – former Ministry of Internal Affairs and Communications civil servant, age 49
- Keisuke Hiwatashi – former mayor of Takeo, Saga, age 45
- Yukihiro Shimatani – professor at Kyushu University, age 59
- Yoshitaka Isagai (飯盛良隆, Isagai Yoshitaka) – farmer, age 44

Former Director of the Finance Bureau Toyonari Sasaki was requested to run at the request of the LDP's Saga Prefecture branch, but declined.

== Results ==
Saga Gubernational Election 2015
Party	Candidate	Votes	%	±%
Independent	Yoshinori Yamaguchi (incumbent)	182,795		
Independent	Keisuke Hiwatashi	143,720		
Independent	Yukihiro Shimatani	32,844		
Independent	Yoshitaka Isagai	6,951		
