= E96 =

E96 may refer to:

- European route E96
- The E96 series of preferred numbers
- E96 cluster bomb
- King's Indian Defense, orthodox variation, Encyclopaedia of Chess Openings code
- Nagasaki Bypass, route E96 in Japan
