= Ariake, Saga =

Ariake Town 有明町
- Former municipality
- Flag Emblem

- Location in Japan
- Coordinates: 33.1516°N 130.1239°E
- Country: Japan
- Region: Kyushu
- Prefecture: Saga Prefecture
- District: Kishima
- Merged: January 1, 2005 (now part of Shiroishi)

Area
  - Total: 32.76 km^{2} (12.65 sq mi)

Population (March 31, 2004)
  - Total: 8,944
  - Density: 273.02/km^{2} (707.1/sq mi)
- Time zone: UTC+09:00 (JST)
- Website: www.town.shiroishi.lg.jp

Ariake (有明町, Ariake-chō) was a town located in Kishima District, Saga Prefecture, Japan.

On January 1, 2005, Ariake, along with the town of Fukudomi (also from Kishima District), was merged into the expanded town of Shiroishi.

The former Ariake Town Hall is now actually the site of the main Shiroishi Town Hall. Ariake borders the Ariake Sea, and from the Edo period through the Shōwa period land was reclaimed from this sea.

== Geography ==
Ariake is long east to west. In the west it borders Shiota at Kishima Mountain, and in the east it borders the Ariake Sea and is an area of lowland rice paddies. To the north it becomes Shiroishi, and to the south it borders Kashima along the Shiota River. The eastern third of the town is reclaimed land. The town proper is northeast of the train station, Hizen-Ryūō, and near Megurie River.

- Mountains: Shiraiwa Mountain (340.3m, 1116.5 ft), Īmori Mountain (317.8m, 1042.7 ft)
- Rivers: Shiota River, Megurie River, Tadae River

=== Adjoining Municipalities ===
- Kashima
- Shiroishi
- Ureshino

== History ==
- April 1, 1889 -
  - Fukaura (深浦村) and Sakata (坂田村) were merged to become Ryūō (竜王村).
  - Heta (辺田村), Tanoue (田野上村) and Togari (戸ケ里村) were merged to become Kinkō (錦江村).
  - Ushiya (牛屋村) and Yokote (横手村) were merged to create Minami-Ariake (南有明村).
- April 1, 1955 - Kinkō (錦江村) and Ryūō (竜王村) were merged to create Ariake Village (有明村).
- September 30, 1955 - Minami-Ariake (南有明村) was incorporated into Ariake Village (有明村).
- October 1, 1962 - Ariake Village (有明村) became Ariake Town (有明町).
- January 1, 2005 - Ariake Town was incorporated into Shiroishi.

== Transportation ==
=== Air ===
The closest airport is Saga Airport.

=== Rail ===
- JR Kyushu
  - Nagasaki Main Line
    - Hizen-Ryūō

=== Road ===
- National Highways: Route 207, Route 34
