= Kitagata, Saga =

Kitagata Town 北方町
- Former municipality
- Flag Emblem

- Location in Japan
- Coordinates: 33°13′48″N 130°3′46″E
- Country: Japan
- Region: Kyushu
- Prefecture: Saga Prefecture
- District: Kishima
- Merged: March 1, 2006 (now part of Takeo)

Area
  - Total: 27.25 km^{2} (10.52 sq mi)

Population (October 1, 2004)
  - Total: 8,427
  - Density: 309.25/km^{2} (801.0/sq mi)
- Time zone: UTC+09:00 (JST)
- Website: Takeo City

For other places with the same name, see Kitagata (disambiguation).

Kitagata (北方町, Kitagata-machi) was a town located in Kishima District, Saga Prefecture, Japan.

On March 1, 2006, Kitagata, along with the town of Yamauchi (also from Kishima District), was merged into the expanded city of Takeo.

== Geography ==
- Rivers: Rokkaku River

=== Adjoining municipalities ===
- Ōmachi
- Shiroishi
- Takeo
- Taku

== History ==
During the Edo period the Nagasaki Kaidō passed through Kitagata. During the Meiji period the Nishiki coal mine was operated and the coal industry flourished. However, it closed in 1960.

- April 1, 1889 - The modern system of municipalities was established. The area consisted of two villages: Kitagata and Hashishita.
- April 29, 1944 - Kitagata Village became Kitagata Town.
- April 1, 1956 - Part of Hashishita Village was incorporated into Kitagata Town. The remaining part was incorporated into Shiroishi Town.

== Education ==
- Kitagata Junior High School
- Kitagata Elementary School

== Transportation ==
=== Rail ===
- JR Kyushu
  - Sasebo Line
    - Kitagata Station

=== Road ===
- Expressways
  - Nagasaki Expressway
    - Takeo-Kitagata Interchange
- National highways
  - Route 34
- Main prefectural roads
  - Saga Prefectural Route 25 (Taku-Wakagi)
  - Saga Prefectural Route 36 (Takeo-Fukudomi)

== Notable places ==
- Shiki no Oka Park
- Daishō-ji
