= Shiota, Saga =

Shiota Town 塩田町
- Former municipality
- Location in Japan
- Coordinates: 33.1268°N 130.0589°E
- Country: Japan
- Region: Kyushu
- Prefecture: Saga Prefecture
- District: Fujitsu
- Merged: January 1, 2006 (now part of Ureshino)

Area
  - Total: 46.05 km^{2} (17.78 sq mi)

Population (November 30, 2004)
  - Total: 11,987
  - Density: 260.3/km^{2} (674/sq mi)
- Time zone: UTC+09:00 (JST)
- Website: www.city.ureshino.lg.jp

Shiota (塩田町, Shiota-chō) was a town located in Fujitsu District, Saga Prefecture, Japan.

On January 1, 2006, Shiota, along with the former town of Ureshino (also from Fujitsu District), was merged to create the city of Ureshino.

== Geography ==
Shiota is located in the southwestern part of Saga, inland of the Ariake Sea. It is surrounded on three sides by mountains.

- Mountains: Mt. Tōsen, Mt. Kishima
- Rivers: Shiota River

=== Adjoining Municipalities ===
- Kashima
- Shiroishi
- Takeo
- Ureshino

== History ==
- April 1, 1889 - The modern municipal system is formed and three villages exist in the current area occupied by Shiota: Shiota Village, Kuma Village, and Gochōda Village.
- October 5, 1918 - Shiota Village becomes Shiota Town.
- September 1, 1956 - Kuma Village and Gochōda Village are incorporated into Shiota Town.
- January 1, 2006 - Shiota Town and Ureshino Town merge to form Ureshino City.

== Demographics ==
23.6% of the population of Shiota are 65 or older.

== Education ==
=== High schools ===
- Saga Prefectural Industrial High School

=== Junior high schools ===
- Shiota Junior High School

=== Elementary schools ===
- Gochōda Elementary School
- Shiota Elementary School
- Kuma Elementary School
- Ureshino Associated Ōkusano Elementary School

== Notable Places and Festivals ==
- O-Yama-san Matsuri-hi (お山さん祭り日), April 5
- Shiota Kunchi (塩田くんち), November 2–3
- Hachimangū Reisai, (annual festival for the god of war shrine) November 3
- Tanjō Shrine
