= Hiwatashi =

Hiwatashi (written: 樋渡 or 日渡) is a Japanese surname. Notable people with the surname include:

- Keisuke Hiwatashi (樋渡啓祐, born 1969), Japanese entrepreneur and businessman
- Tomoki Hiwatashi (born 2000), American figure skater
- Yui Hiwatashi (樋渡 結依, born 2000), Japanese idol, singer and voice actress

== Fictional characters ==
- Nazuna Hiwatashi (日渡 なずな), a character in the anime series BNA: Brand New Animal

== See also ==
- 10601 Hiwatashi, a main-belt asteroid
