= E48 =

E48 may refer to:

- E48 particulate bomb, a U.S. biological sub-munition designed during the 1950s
- The E48 series of preferred numbers
- European route E48
- HMS E48, a 1916 British E class submarine
- Sendai-Nanbu Road and Yamagata Expressway, route E48 in Japan
