= Keisuke Hiwatashi =

Japanese politician and businessman

- 樋渡啓祐
- Born: 18 November 1969 (age 56); Takeo, Saga Prefecture, Japan
- Education: University of Tokyo
- Website: hiwatashishachu.jp

Keisuke Hiwatashi (樋渡啓祐, Hiwatashi Keisuke; born 18 November 1969 in Takeo, Saga Prefecture, Japan) is a Japanese politician, entrepreneur, and businessman. He is the founder and CEO of Hiwatashi Shachū, a consulting and marketing services firm created after he left the public service sector. He has written four books.

== Biography ==
Hiwatashi was born on 18 November 1969 in Asahi-chō, Takeo, Saga Prefecture, Japan. There, he attended Asahi Elementary School followed by Takeo Seiryo Junior High School. He graduated from Saga Prefectural Takeo High School in 1988. He studied economics at the University of Tokyo, graduating in 1994. That same year, he was hired in the human resources department of the Ministry of Internal Affairs and Communications (MIAC), where he was made department head of General Affairs in 1995.

He was promoted to supervisor of the Adjustments Department of the Okinawa Development Agency in 1996. Hiwatashi became the chief investigator of the Cabinet Secretariat in 1997, an assistant councillor in the Cabinet Office in 2000, and an assistant councillor in the Minister's Secretariat Office in the MIAC in 2002.

In 2003, Hiwatashi was temporarily transferred from MIAC to act as section chief in the office of the mayor of Takatsuki, a city in Osaka Prefecture. After transferring back to the MIAC to work as Deputy Director of the secretarial section, he retired from MIAC in 2005.

=== Mayor of Takeo ===
In 2006, shortly after the merger of Kitagata and Yamauchi into Takeo, Hiwatashi was elected mayor of his hometown. At age 36, he was the youngest person elected as a mayor in the city's history. He oversaw the revamping of the town's public library, working with Culture Convenience Club to expand and manage the library and integrate a Starbucks café and a bookstore into it. Since the new library opened in 2013, the number of daily patrons increased about 400 percent and the number of books checked out increased about 200 percent.

He also initiated a program to provide tablets to all of the elementary and junior high students in the city as a way to help them improve their learning. He served as mayor for two terms, totaling two years and eight months.

During his second term as mayor in 2008, Hiwatashi took a position as a guest lecturer at Kansai University. Due to concerns about the Takeo municipal hospital, a group of Takeo citizens organized a recall effort and forcing Hiwatashi to resign as mayor and a new election to be held. Hiwatashi left his position at Kansai University at this time. After the dispute regarding the hospital was settled, Hiwatashi was re-elected as mayor in 2010. He ran for and won a third term as mayor in September 2013. In July 2014, he took the position of director of the Takeo tourism bureau.

=== Gubernatorial run ===
When Yasushi Furukawa, then governor of Saga Prefecture, announced his resignation as governor due to being elected to the House of Representatives, Hiwatashi announced his candidacy for the governorship after resigning as mayor. He was defeated in January 2015 by Yoshinori Yamaguchi, losing by almost 41,000 votes.

== Business ventures ==
=== FB Superior Goods ===
As part of an effort to revitalize Takeo and Saga Prefecture, Hiwatashi launched a city-sponsored online store project on Facebook called FB Superior Goods Takeo (FB良品 武雄, Efu Bī Ryōhin Takeo) on 7 November 2011. By August 2013, thirteen additional stores had opened under the "FB Superior Goods" name, each for different cities or areas. The name of the project changed to "Japan Satisfaction Guaranteed" in September 2013, and it moved to the Yahoo! Shopping platform in January 2014. Six additional online stores opened through March of that year, bringing the total to 19 stores.

Beginning in September 2014, the stores began closing due to poor sales. This continued over the next three-and-a-half years until all of the stores had closed by the end of March 2018.

=== Hiwatashi Shachū ===
Shortly after losing his gubernatorial run, Hiwatashi launched an online magazine titled Keisuke Hiwatashi's Confidential Countryside Revitalization Discussion (樋渡啓祐の地方創生ここだけの話, Hiwatashi Keisuke no Chihō Sōsei Koko Dake no Hanashi). On 2 February 2015, he founded Hiwatashi Shachū, a marketing and consulting firm.

== Bibliography ==
Hiwatashi wrote the following books:

- Hansei Shinai. (反省しない。) (August 2014, Kadokawa, ISBN 9784046005878)
- Futtō! Toshokan: 100-mannin ga Otozure Odoroki no Hakomono (沸騰!図書館 100万人が訪れた驚きのハコモノ) (May 2014, Kadokawa, ISBN 9784041018163)
- Shuchō Panchi: Sainenshō Shichō GABBA Funsenki (首長パンチ――最年少市長GABBA奮戦記) (December 2010, Kodansha, ISBN 9784062166768)
- "Chikarazuyoi" Chihōzukuri no Tame no, Aete "Chikara Yowai" Senryakuron (「力強い」地方づくりのための、あえて「力弱い」戦略論) (February 2008, Benesse, ISBN 9784828863412)
