= Nagao Station =

Nagao Station is the name of two train stations in Japan:

- Nagao Station (Kagawa) (長尾駅)
- Nagao Station (Osaka) (長尾駅)
- Nagao Station (Saga) (永尾駅)
