= Takeo ware =

Type of Japanese pottery

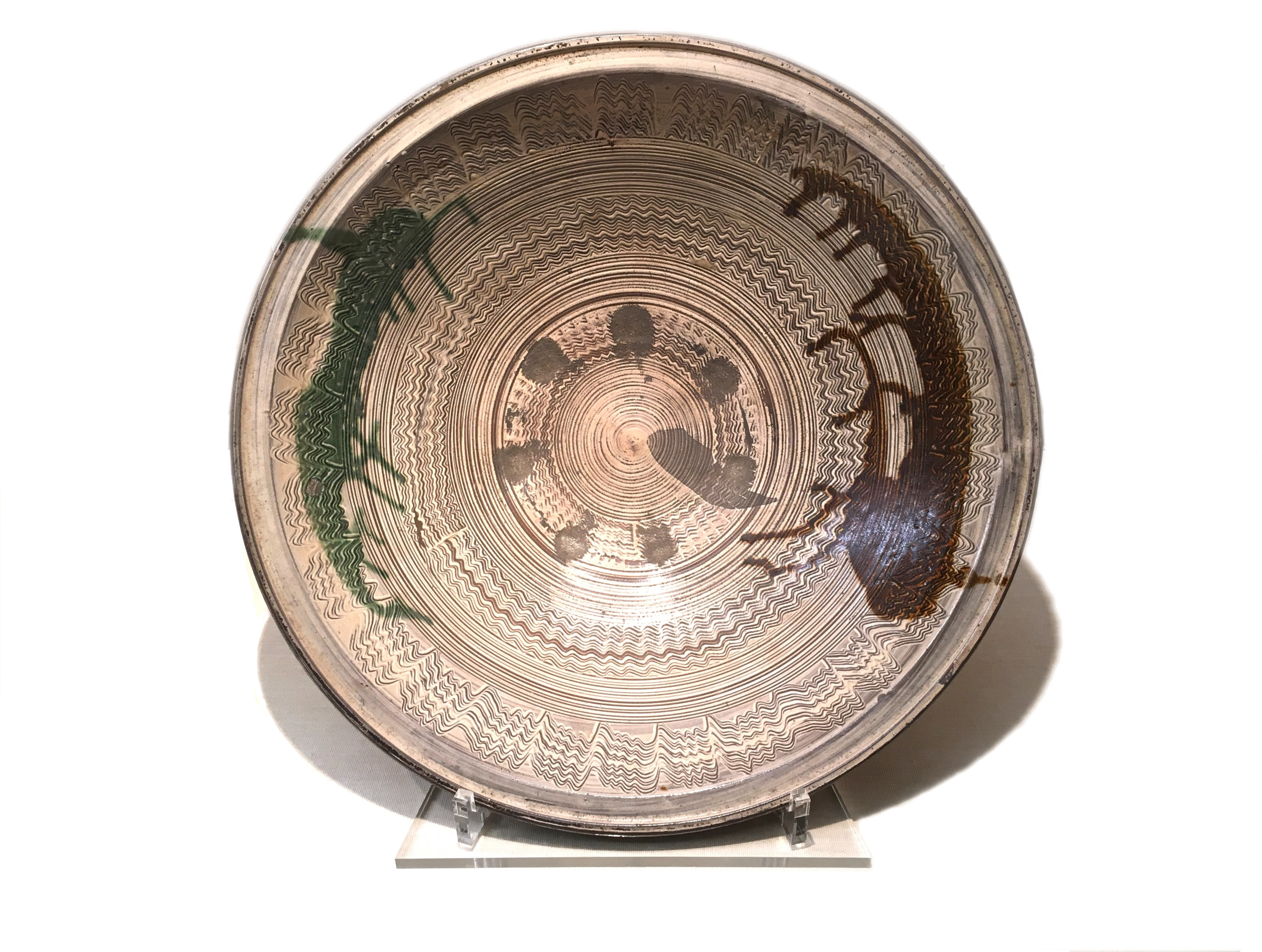
Takeo ware shed glazed large bowl with comb-mark pattern, Edo period, 18th century

Takeo ware (武雄焼) is a type of Japanese pottery originally from Takeo, Saga, western Japan.

== History ==
The history dates back to the end of the 16th century during the Japanese invasion of Korea. Korean ceramic artists came with the lord of Takeo and started ceramic production in that area. This type of pottery is called Ko-Takeo (old Takeo).

Today around 90 kilns exist in the town and area.
