= Yamauchi, Saga =

Yamauchi 山内町
- Former municipality
- Location in Japan
- Coordinates: 33°11′N 129°57′E
- Country: Japan
- Region: Kyushu
- Prefecture: Saga Prefecture
- District: Kishima
- Merged: March 1, 2006 (now part of Takeo)

Area
  - Total: 40.91 km^{2} (15.80 sq mi)

Population (November 30, 2004)
  - Total: 9,745
  - Density: 238.21/km^{2} (617.0/sq mi)
- Time zone: UTC+09:00 (JST)
- Website: Takeo City

Yamauchi (山内町, Yamauchi-chō) was a town located in Kishima District, Saga Prefecture, Japan.

On March 1, 2006, Yamauchi, along with the town of Kitagata (also from Kishima District), was merged into the expanded city of Takeo.

== Geography ==
- Mountains: Mt. Kurokami, Mt. Jinroku
- Rivers: Matsuura River (source)

=== Adjoining municipalities ===
- Saga Prefecture
  - Arita
  - Imari
  - Takeo
- Nagasaki Prefecture
  - Hasami

== History ==
- April 1, 1889 - The modern municipality system was established. The area consisted of two villages: Nakato and Sumiyoshi.
- April 1, 1954 - Nakato and Sumiyoshi were merged to create Yamauchi Village.
- March 1, 1955 - Part of Takeuchi Town was incorporated into Yamauchi Village.
- September 1, 1960 - Yamauchi Village became Yamauchi Town (Yamauchi-machi)

== Education ==
- Yamauchi Junior High School
- Yamauchi Higashi Elementary School
- Yamauchi Nishi Elementary School

== Transportation ==
=== Rail ===
- JR Kyushu
  - Sasebo Line
    - Nagao Station - Mimasaka Station

=== Road ===
- Expressways:
  - Nagasaki Expressway
    - Takeo-Kitagata Interchange
- National highways:
  - Route 35
- Prefectural roads:
  - Saga Prefectural Route 26 (Imari-Yamauchi)
  - Saga Prefectural Route 28 (Ōchi-Yamauchi)
  - Saga Prefectural Route 45 (Ureshino-Yamauchi)

== Notable places and events ==
- Mt. Kurokami, Fūfu Rock
- Kurokami no Roman festival
- Sangyō festival
- Chūō Park

== Sister cities ==
- (United States) Sebastopol, California
