= Kamairicha =

Japanese green tea

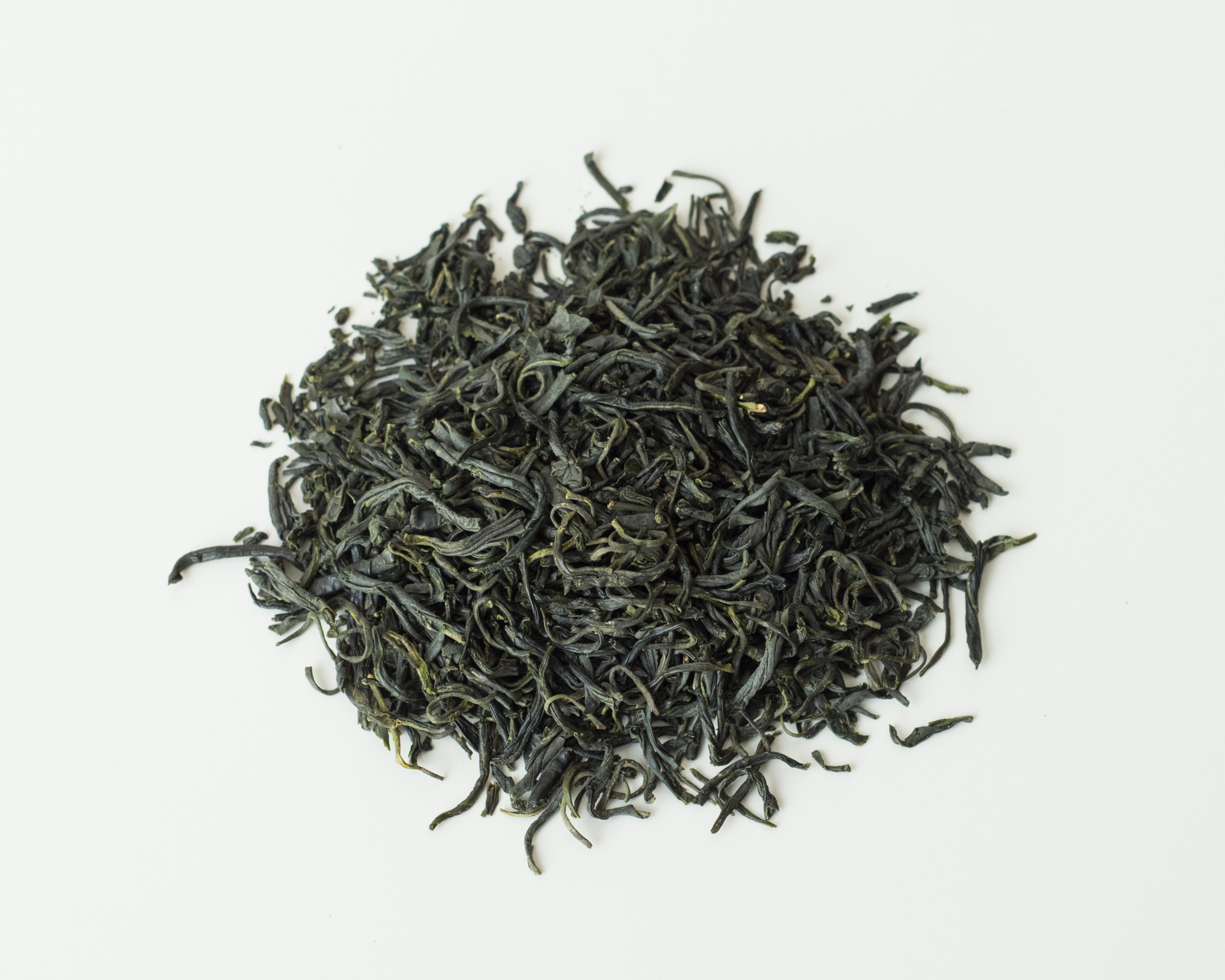
- Type: Green
- Other names: Pan-Fired or Pan-Roasted Tea
- Origin: Japan
- Quick description: Fired (Roasted) in hot iron pans, then rolled. Has a sweet, mildly roasted flavor.

Kamairicha (釜炒り茶) is a Japanese green tea produced by pan-roasting or pan-firing tea leaves during the early stages of production. It is most commonly produced in the western region of Japan. Kamairicha has a mildly roasted flavour with more sweet and fresh notes than bitter ones.

It does not undergo the usual steam treatments of Japanese tea and does not have the characteristic astringent taste of most Japanese tea. After a short withering, they are fired in hot iron pans of up to 300°C with repeated agitation to prevent charring. The various rolling techniques used produce teas of different leaf form. It is made of leaves that are shaped like commas or magatama.

== Production ==
The process of making kamairicha began in China. However, it is a speciality of Kyushu, Japan. Kamairicha is widely produced in Saga, Nagasaki, Kumamoto, Oita and Miyazaki prefectures. Sechibaru in Nagasaki Prefecture and Ureshino in Saga Prefecture are two of the most respected for their pan-fried manufacturing process. It can also be home-made.

While most Japanese green tea undergoes a steaming process prepare leaves for consumption, kamairicha is roasted in an iron vessel that normally stays between 300 and 450 °C and is in constant motion. This dries the leaves, prevents further oxidization, and helps give each leave its unique shape. It is sometimes referred to as ‘Chinese green tea’ by the Japanese owing to the pan-frying processing technique.

== Nutritional content ==
Kamairicha is almost as high as sencha in vitamin C, A, B1, B2, and niacin.

== Flavor/Aroma ==
The process of making kamairicha develops sweet, mildly roasted flavors, which are very similar to the pan-fried teas produced in China today. Kamairicha has a characteristically light, refreshing taste that lacks astringency.

== See also ==
- List of Japanese teas
- Sencha - Japanese green tea
- History of tea in Japan
- Tea Culture in Japan
