= Kitagata =

Kitagata may refer to:

- Kitagata, Gifu, a town in Gifu Prefecture, Japan
- Kitagata, Saga, a former town in Saga Prefecture, Japan
- Kitagata, Uganda, a town
- Kitagata Hot Springs, in Uganda

== See also ==
- Kitakata (disambiguation)
