= Kitakata (disambiguation) =

Kitakata is a city in Fukushima Prefecture, Japan

Kitakata may also refer to:

- Kitakata, Miyazaki, a former town in Japan
- Kitakata Station, a train station in Kitakata, Fukushima

== See also ==
- Kitagata (disambiguation)
