= Otsuboyama Kōgoishi =

Castle ruins in Saga, Japan

- おつぼ山神籠石
- Takeo, Saga, Japan
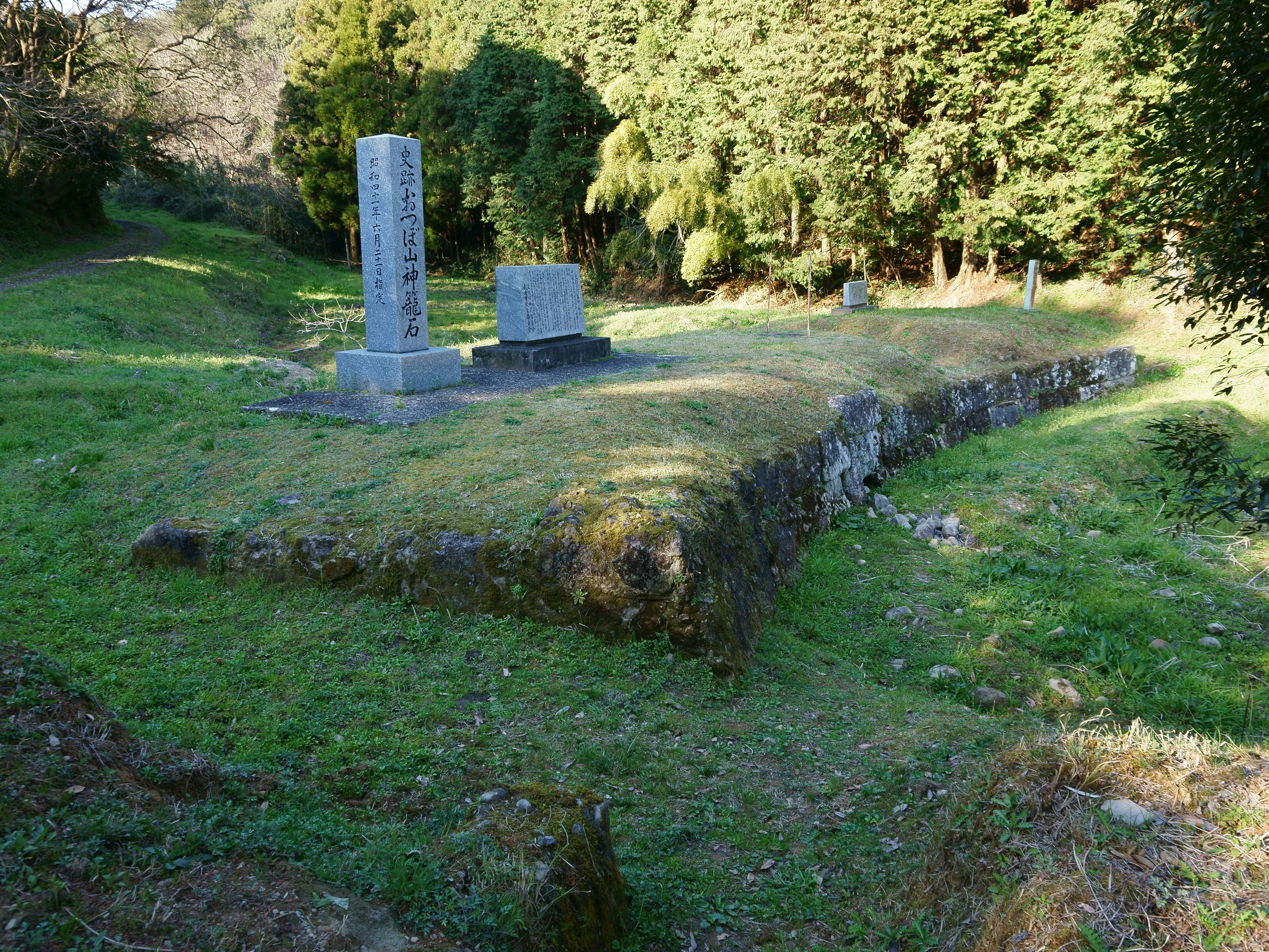
- Otuboyama Kōgoishi first water gate

Site information
- Type: Korean-style fortress
- Condition: ruins

Site history
- Built: Asuka period
- Built by: Yamato court
- Otsuboyama Kōgoishi (Fukuoka Prefecture) Otsuboyama Kōgoishi (Japan) National Historic Site of Japan

Otsuboyama Kōgoishi (おつぼ山神籠石) was an ancient Korean-style fortress located in the Tachibana neighborhood of the city of Takeo, Saga Prefecture, Japan. Its ruins have been protected as a National Historic Site since 1966.

== History ==
After the defeat of the combined Baekje and Yamato Japan forces, at the hands of the Silla and Tang China alliance at the Battle of Hakusukinoe in 663, the Yamato court feared an invasion from either or both Tang or Silla. In response, a huge network of shore fortifications was constructed throughout the rest of the 600s, often with the assistance of Baekje engineers, generals and artisans. Unaware of the outbreak of the Silla-Tang War (670–676), the Japanese would continue to build fortifications until 701, even after finding out that Silla was no longer friendly with Tang. The name "kōgoishi" means "stones of divine protection," a name given them by the Meiji period archaeologist Tsuboi Shōgorō, who conjectured that they served as spiritual or practical protection for sacred sites. Scholars after Tsuboi determined that the structures are most likely the remains of practical, military fortifications, and were unlikely to have significant spiritual connections, although much remains unknown about these structures and there is very little contemporary documentary evidence.

Otsuboyama Kōgoishi is located in a low hilly area extending from the mountain range to the west of the Saga Plain. It was discovered in 1962, and archaeological excavations were conducted the following year, and it was confirmed to be a Korean-style mountain castle. The stone rows have a total length of 1,866 meters, and a 9-meter-wide earthwork is located on top of the stone rows. There are some sections from the northern end to the southwest where the stones are now missing. A water gate was installed in the valley, and the remains of two gates have also been confirmed. Each stone in the rows is about 70-centimeters high and 40-centimeters thick, and there are 1,313 remaining stones. There are post holes at 3-meter intervals in front of the rows, which are thought to have been used to support boards for building the earthwork as they are tilted inward at a 10 degree angle. In front of the first earthwork, small cornerstones were found between the row of post holes and the rows of stones at 1-meter intervals, so it is presumed that these pillars are the post holes for pillars that were joined to form a defensive fence. The stone rows that serve as the foundation stones for the earthwork are curved to match the complex topography of the mountain.

The site is about a 15-minute drive from Takeo-Onsen Station on the JR Kyushu Sasebo Line.

== See also ==
- List of Historic Sites of Japan (Saga)
- List of foreign-style castles in Japan
- Kōgoishi

== Literature ==
- De Lange, William (2021). An Encyclopedia of Japanese Castles. Groningen: Toyo Press. pp. 600 pages. ISBN 978-9492722300.
