= Mimasaka Station =

Railway station in Takeo, Saga Prefecture, Japan

Mimasaka Station 三間坂駅
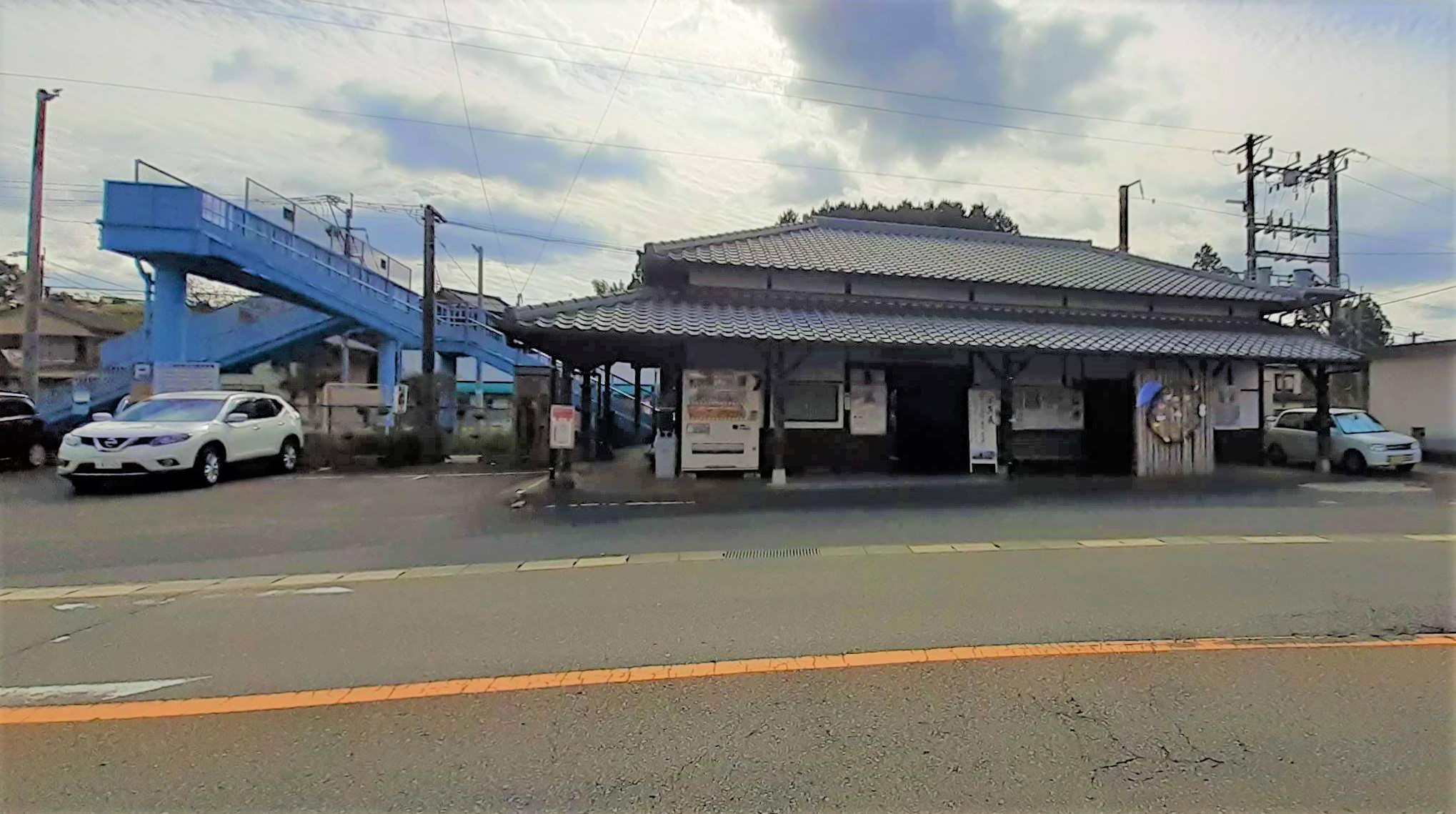
- Mimasaka Station in November 2020

General information
- Location: Yamauchicho Oaza Mimasaka, Takeo-shi, Saga-ken 849-2303; Japan
- Coordinates: 33°11′41″N 129°56′52″E
- Operator: JR Kyushu
- Line: ■ Sasebo Line
- Distance: 21.5 km from Hizen-Yamaguchi
- Platforms: 2 side platforms
- Tracks: 2 + 1 siding + 1 through-track

Construction
- Structure type: At grade
- Accessible: No – platforms linked by footbridge

Other information
- Status: Unstaffed
- Website: Official website

History
- Opened: 10 July 1897

Passengers
- FY2020: 308 daily
- Rank: 273rd (among JR Kyushu stations)

Services
| Preceding station | JR Kyushu | Following station |
|---|---|---|
| Kami-Arita towards Sasebo | Sasebo Line | Nagao towards Kōhoku |
Location
- Location within Saga Prefecture Location within Japan

Mimasaka Station (三間坂駅, Mimasaka-eki) is a passenger railway station located in the Yamauchi neighborhood of the city of Takeo, Saga Prefecture, Japan. It is operated by JR Kyushu.

== Lines ==
The station is served by the Sasebo Line and is located 21.5 km from the starting point of the line at Hizen-Yamaguchi. Only local services on the Sasebo Line stop at this station.

== Station layout ==
The station consists of two side platforms serving two tracks (track 1 and track 3). Track 2 is a through-track which runs between the other two and a siding branches off track 1. The station building is a timber structure which used to house a ticket window but has become unstaffed and presently serves only as a waiting room. Access to the opposite side platform is by means of a footbridge.

=== Platforms ===
| 1 | ■ Sasebo Line | for Arita and Isahaya for Takeo-Onsen and Saga |
| 2 | ■ Sasebo Line | for Arita and Isahaya |

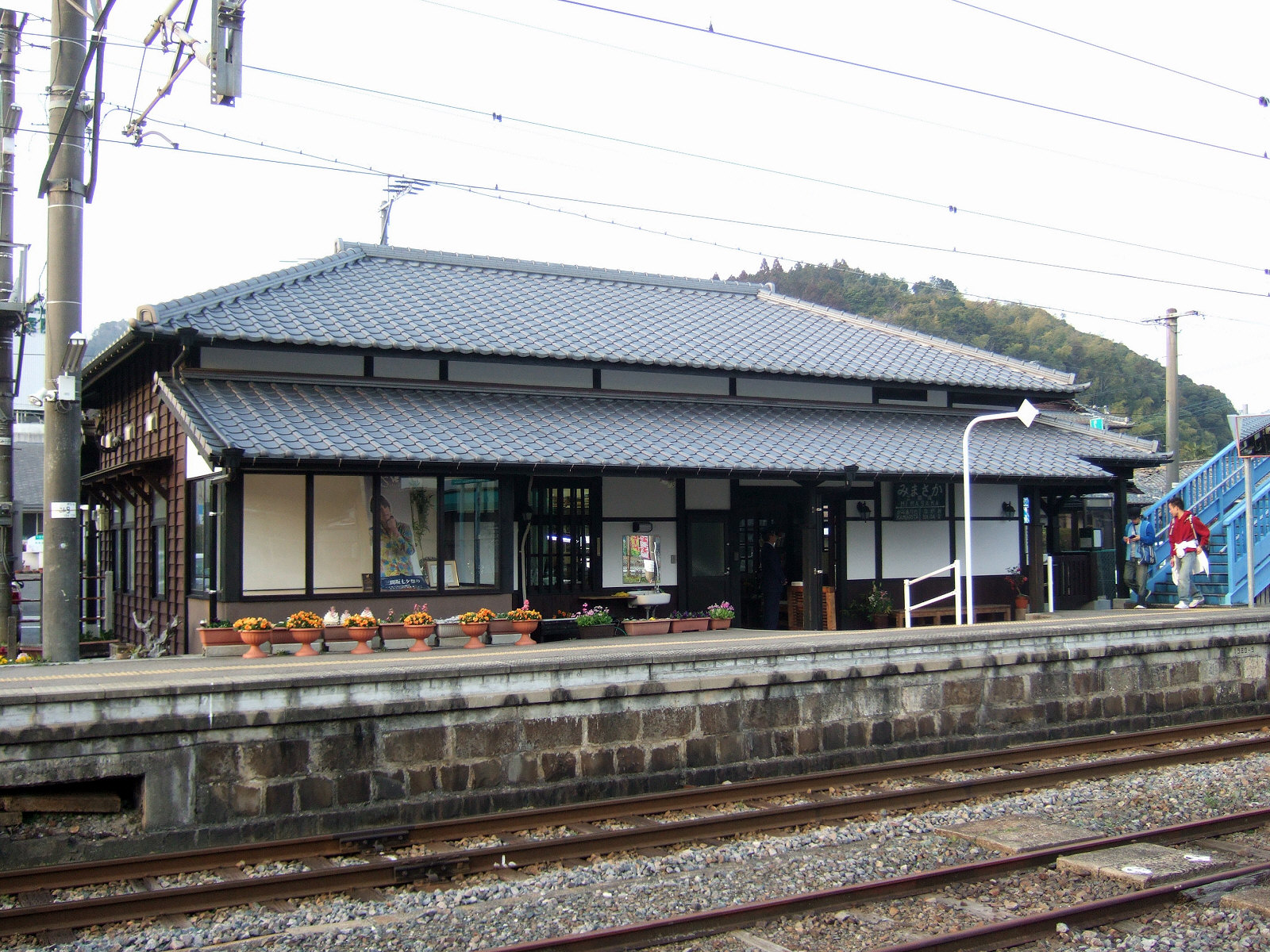
Station building from the platform

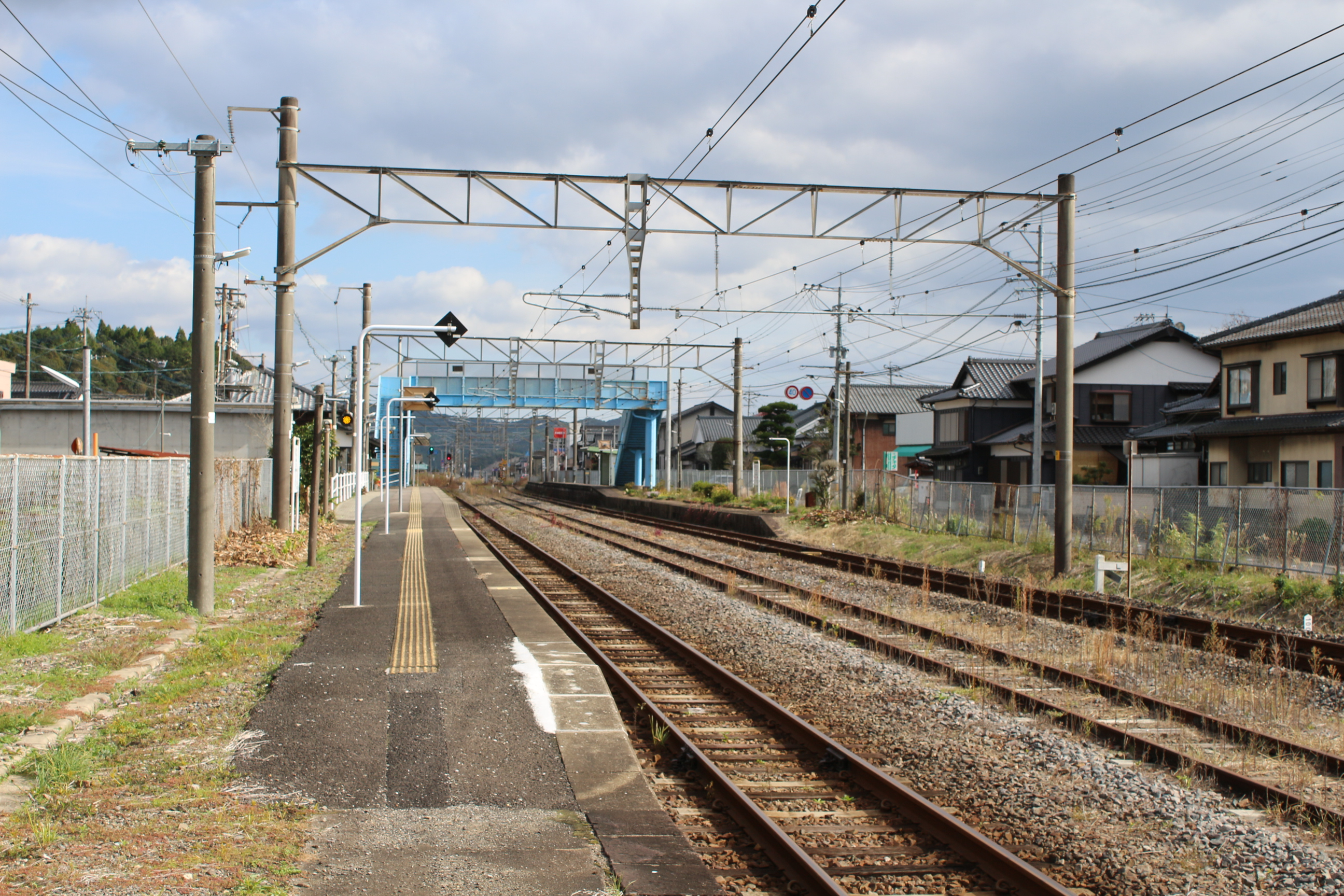
Platform

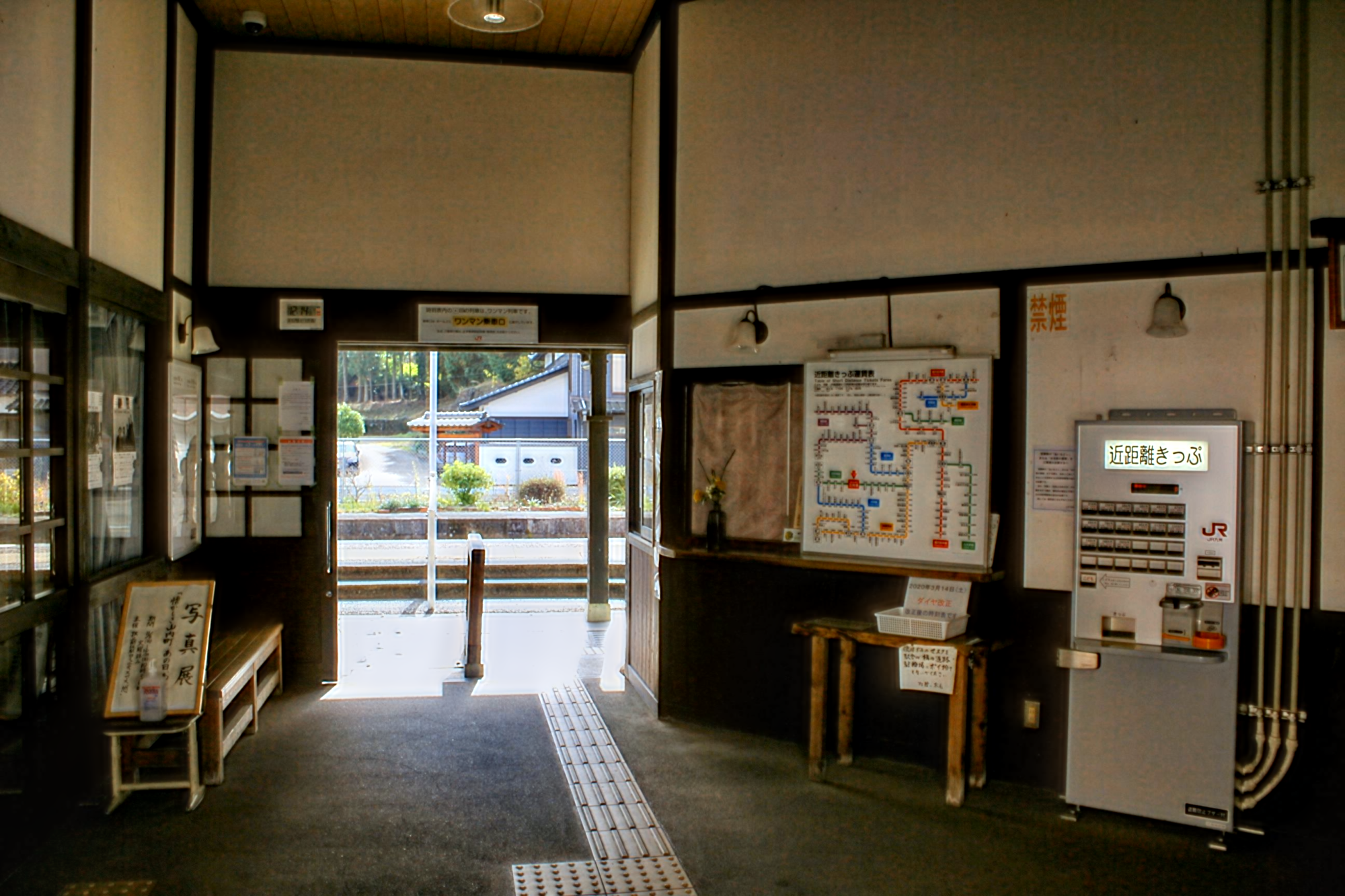
Gate

== History ==
The private Kyushu Railway had opened a track from Tosu to Saga and Takeo (today Takeo-Onsen) by 5 May 1895. In the next phase of expansion, the track was extended further west with Haiki opening as the new western terminus on 10 July 1897. Mimasaka was opened on the same day as an intermediate station on the new track. When the Kyushu Railway was nationalized on 1 July 1907, Japanese Government Railways (JGR) took over control of the station. On 12 October 1909, track from Tosu through Mimasaka and Haiki to Nagasaki was designated the Nagasaki Main Line. On 1 December 1934, another route was given the designation Nagasaki Main Line and the official starting point of the Sasebo Line was moved from Haiki to Hizen-Yamaguchi. As such Mimasaka now became part of the Sasebo Line. With the privatization of Japanese National Railways (JNR), the successor of JGR, on 1 April 1987, control of the station passed to JR Kyushu.

The station became unstaffed in 2016.

== Passenger statistics ==
In fiscal 2020, the station was used by an average of 308 passengers daily (boarding passengers only), and it ranked 273rd among the busiest stations of JR Kyushu.

== Surrounding area ==
- Mimasaka Post Office
- Takeo City Office Yamauchi Branch

== See also ==
- List of railway stations in Japan
