= Taizo Ichinose =

Japanese photographer

Taizo Ichinose (一ノ瀬 泰造, November 1, 1947 – November 29, 1973) was a Japanese war photographer. He was born in Takeo, Saga Prefecture, Kyushu.

When Ichinose was a student at Takeo High School, he played for the school baseball team and participated in the Japanese High School Baseball Championship.

Ichinose was killed while he was in Cambodia, by Khmer Rouge soldiers while attempting to make it to Angkor, at the age of 26.

== Cultural references ==
At the War Remnants Museum in Ho Chi Minh City, Vietnam, a number of articles about Ichinose and his pictures are on display. At the Nikon Museum Ichinose's bullet-riddled black Nikon F is on permanent display.

The 1999 film One Step on a Mine, It's All Over (Jirai wo fundara sayônara) and the 2003 film Taizo are biographies of Inichose. Tadanobu Asano played the role of Ichinose.
