= Hizen-Shiroishi Station =

Railway station in Shiroishi, Saga Prefecture, Japan

Hizen-Shiroishi Station 肥前白石駅
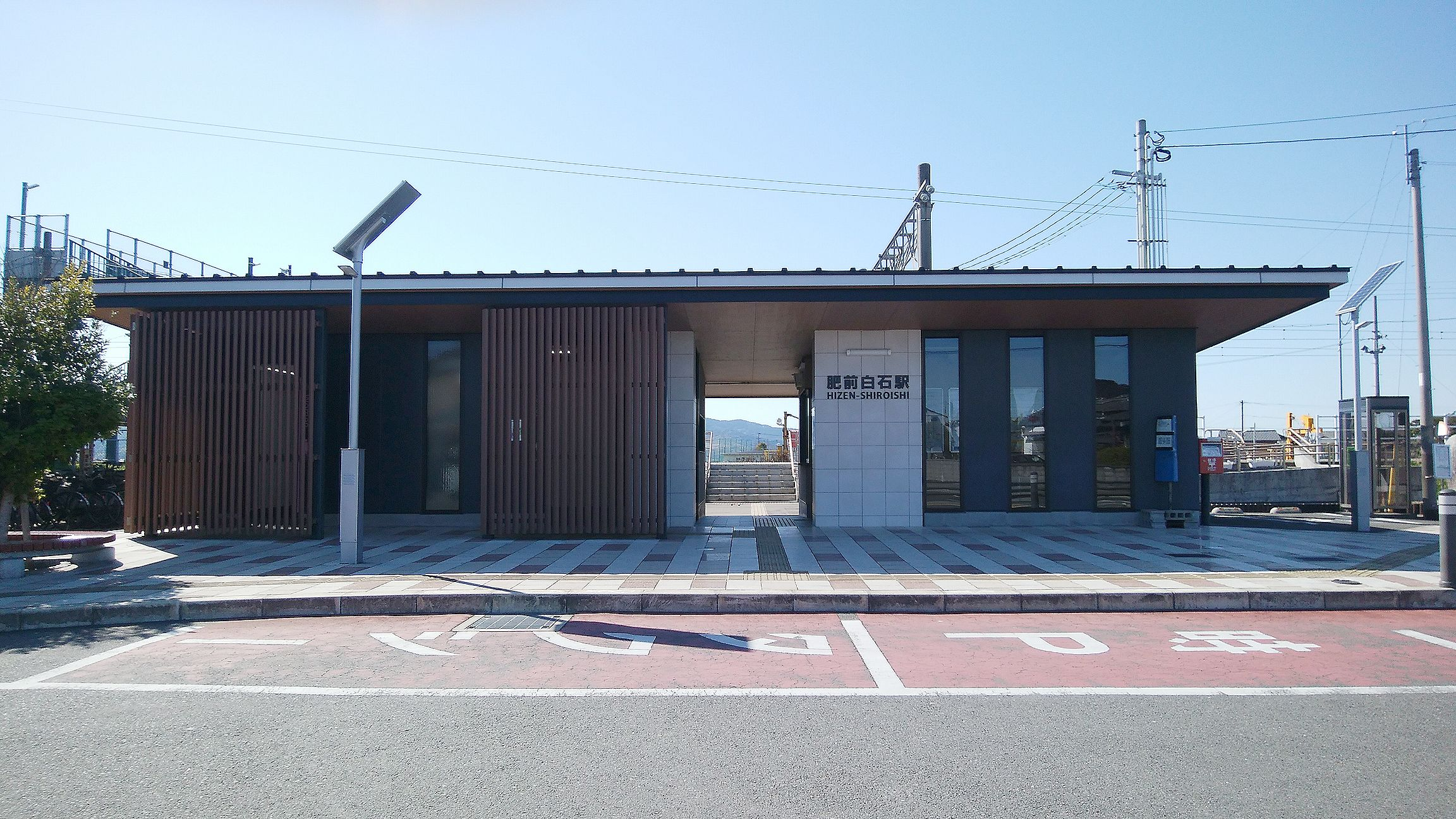
- Hizen-Shiroishi Station

General information
- Location: Fukuta, Shiroishi-cho, Kishima-gun, Saga-ken 849-1112; Japan
- Coordinates: 33°11′13″N 130°08′09″E
- Operator: JR Kyushu
- Line: JH Nagasaki Main Line
- Distance: 44.7 km from Tosu
- Platforms: 2 side platforms
- Tracks: 2 + 1 siding

Construction
- Structure type: At grade
- Accessible: No - platforms linked by footbridge

Other information
- Status: Unstaffed
- Website: Official website

History
- Opened: 9 March 1930
- Former names: Fukuji (to 1940)

Passengers
- FY2022: 649 daily
- Rank: 191st (among JR Kyushu stations)

Services
Preceding station	JR Kyushu	Following station
Hizen-Ryūō towards Nagasaki	Nagasaki Line	Kōhoku towards Tosu
Location
- Location within Saga Prefecture Location within Japan

Hizen-Shiroishi Station (肥前白石駅, Hizenshiroishi-eki) is a passenger railway station located in the town of Shiroishi, Kishima District, Saga Prefecture, Japan. It is operated by JR Kyushu.

== Lines ==
The station is served by the Nagasaki Main Line and is located 44.7 km from the starting point of the line at Tosu.

== Station layout ==
The station consists of two side platforms serving two tracks with a siding running along the other side of platform 2. The station building, a modern structure of steel frame and glass, is unstaffed and serves only as a waiting room. Access to the opposite side platform is by means of a footbridge.

=== Platforms ===
1	■ JH Nagasaki Main Line	for Saga and Tosu
2	■ JH Nagasaki Main Line	for Nagasaki

== History ==
Japanese Government Railways (JGR) built the station in the 1930s during the development of an alternative route for the Nagasaki Main Line along the coast of the Ariake Sea which was at first known as the Ariake Line. In the first phase of construction, the track was extended south from Hizen-Yamaguchi with Hizen-Ryūō opening on 9 March 1930 as the southern terminus. Hizen-Shiroishi, then named Fukuji (福治) was opened on the same day as an intermediate station on the new track. On 1 December 1934, the entire route was completed and through-traffic achieved from Hizen-Yamaguchi through the station to Nagasaki. The line was then redesignated as part of the Nagasaki Main Line. On 1 April 1940, the station was renamed Hizen-Shiroishi. With the privatization of Japanese National Railways (JNR), the successor of JGR, on 1 April 1987, control of the station passed to JR Kyushu.

On 15 October 2016, a new station building was opened. The old building had to make way for the widening of a prefectural road and has been demolished.

== Passenger statistics ==
In fiscal 2020, the station was used by an average of 649 passengers daily (boarding passengers only), and it ranked 191st among the busiest stations of JR Kyushu.

== Longest one-way rail ticket in Japan ==
From April 1, 1988, to April 30, 1989, this station, along with the Sasebo Line's Ōmachi Station, was the starting point from which one could purchase the longest one-way ticket in Japan.

== Surrounding area ==
- Shiroishi High School (佐賀県立白石高等学校)
- Shiroishi Agricultural High School (佐賀県立佐賀農業高等学校)
- Japan National Route 207
- Saga Prefecture Route 36

== See also ==
- List of railway stations in Japan
