= Nagasaki Bypass =

Road in Japan

Nagasaki Bypass
- 国道%route%号
- 長崎バイパス

Route information
- Maintained by West Nippon Expressway Company
- Length: 15.1 km (9.4 mi)
- Existed: 1967–present
- Component highways: National Route 34

Major junctions
- From: Ichinuno Interchange; National Route 34 in Isahaya, Nagasaki
- To: Shōwamachi Interchange; Nagasaki Prefecture Route 113 in Nagasaki; Nishiyama Interchange; Nagasaki Prefecture Route 235 in Nagasaki

Location
- Country: Japan

Highway system
- National highways of Japan; Expressways of Japan

Nagasaki Bypass (長崎バイパス, Nagasaki Baipasu) is a toll road in Nagasaki Prefecture. It is owned and operated by the West Nippon Expressway Company (NEXCO West Japan). The route is signed E96 under Ministry of Land, Infrastructure, Transport and Tourism's "2016 Proposal for Realization of Expressway Numbering."

== Junction list ==
The entire expressway is in Nagasaki Prefecture. TB - toll gate

=== Main Route ===
Location	km	mi	Exit	Name	Destinations	Notes
Isahaya	0.0	0.0		Ichinuno	National Route 34–Isahaya, Nagasaki, Saga	
Isahaya	0.9	0.56	11	Nagasaki-Tarami	Nagasaki Expressway– Central Nagasaki, Fukuoka, Kumamoto, Oita	
Nagasaki	1.5	0.93	11-1	Koga-Ichinuno		Westbound entrance, eastbound exit
Nagasaki	4.0	2.5	11-2	Manose	Nagasaki Prefecture Route 45– Isahaya, Nagayo	Westbound entrance, eastbound exit
Nagasaki	9.2	5.7	TB	Kawahira	for Shōwamachi (Shōwamachi Branch) for Nishiyama (Nishiyama Branch)	
1.000 mi = 1.609 km; 1.000 km = 0.621 mi: Tolled

=== Shōwamachi Branch ===
Location	km	mi	Exit	Name	Destinations	Notes
Nagasaki	0.0	0.0	TB	Kawahira	Main Route	
Nagasaki	0.2	0.12	11-3	Kawahira	Nagasaki Prefecture Route 113– Nagayo, Nagasaki Prefecture Route 235	
Nagasaki	2.1	1.3		Shōwamachi	Nagasaki Prefecture Route 113– Nagasaki Peace Park	
1.000 mi = 1.609 km; 1.000 km = 0.621 mi: Tolled

=== Nishiyama Branch ===
Location	km	mi	Exit	Name	Destinations	Notes
Nagasaki	0.0	0.0	TB	Kawahira	Main Route	
Nagasaki	3.2	2.0		Nishiyama	Nagasaki Prefecture Route 235– Suwa Shrine	
1.000 mi = 1.609 km; 1.000 km = 0.621 mi: Tolled

== See also ==
- Japan National Route 34
