= E96 cluster bomb =

American anti-personnel biological cluster bomb developed in 1950

The E96 cluster bomb was an American anti-personnel biological cluster bomb developed in 1950.

== History ==
A February 24, 1950 report prepared by William M. Creasy, a colonel in the Army Chemical Corps' Research and Engineering Division, characterized the E96 cluster bomb as in the final stages of development. According to Creasy's report, at the time the U.S. had no other biological weapon systems ready for use in battle.

== Specifications ==
The E96 cluster bomb was a 500-pound (227 kg) biological weapon designed to deliver an anti-personnel or anti-animal biological agent. It consisted of 104 E48 sub-munitions, each one weighing 4 pounds (2 kg). The sub-munitions were clustered into an E38 cluster adapter and when used, would be dropped from 35,000 feet (11,000 m) generating an aerosol cloud in the shape of an ellipse.
