= Yoshinori Yamaguchi =

Japanese politician (born 1965)

- 山口 祥義
- Yamaguchi in 2025

Governor of Saga Prefecture
- Incumbent
- Assumed office January 14, 2015
- Monarchs: Akihito; Naruhito
- Preceded by: Yasushi Furukawa

Personal details
- Born: July 1, 1965 (age 61) Iruma, Saitama, Japan
- Party: Independent
- Education: University of Tokyo; Graduate School for Law and Politics

Yoshinori Yamaguchi (Japanese: 山口 祥義, Hepburn: Yamaguchi Yoshinori; born July 1, 1965) is a Japanese politician and the current governor of Saga Prefecture located in the Kyushu region of Japan.

== Early life and education ==
Yamaguchi was born on July 1, 1965, at the Iruma Air Base in Iruma, Saitama Prefecture. He is the youngest of the nine siblings. His father served in the Japan Air Self-Defense Force. He attended and graduated from LaSalle High School, where he served as a student council vice president. He attended and graduated the University of Tokyo Faculty of Law in March 1989.

== Political career ==
In April 1989, he joined the Ministry of Home Affairs (now part of the Ministry of Internal Affairs and Communications). He later became the Director of the Depopulation Countermeasures Office of the Ministry of Internal Affairs and Communications and served as Director of the General Affairs Department of Nagasaki Prefecture.

=== Governor of Saga Prefecture ===
After then-governor of Saga Yasushi Furukawa resigned in November 2014 to run in the House of Representatives, an election was scheduled to be held in January 2015. In December, Yamaguchi decided to run in the gubernatorial election after being persuaded by several mayors and industry associations in the Prefecture. His campaign was focused on agricultural reforms. He won the 2015 gubernatorial election against the Liberal Democratic Party (LDP) candidate and former Takeo City Mayor Keisuke Hiwatari, winning by 40,000 votes which was viewed as "unexpected".

In 2016, Yamaguchi, alongside Governor Shunji Kōno of Miyazaki Prefecture, and Governor Tsugumasa Muraoka of Yamaguchi Prefecture, worked with the Kyushu Yamaguchi Work Life Promotion Campaign to encourage men to help out their wives at home. The three governors wore a 7.3 kg (16 lb) pregnancy simulation vest to show how difficult it is for a woman to do housework in her third trimester of pregnancy.

He ran for reelection in the 2018 gubernatorial election. He was reelected by a landslide, garnering 84.7% of the votes against his opponent, Masato Imada of the Communist Party of Saga Prefecture.

On August 12, 2019, the special Natsu no Saga, a documentary on the Zombie Land Saga anime (which takes place in the prefecture), featured Yamaguchi cosplaying as major character Kotaro Tatsumi.

He ran for another reelection in 2022 the gubernatorial election. He was again reelected by a large margin, garnering 195,907 votes against his opponent, Yasutoshi Uemura of the Communist Party of Saga.
