= Nagao Station (Saga) =

Railway station in Takeo, Saga Prefecture, Japan

Nagao Station 永尾駅
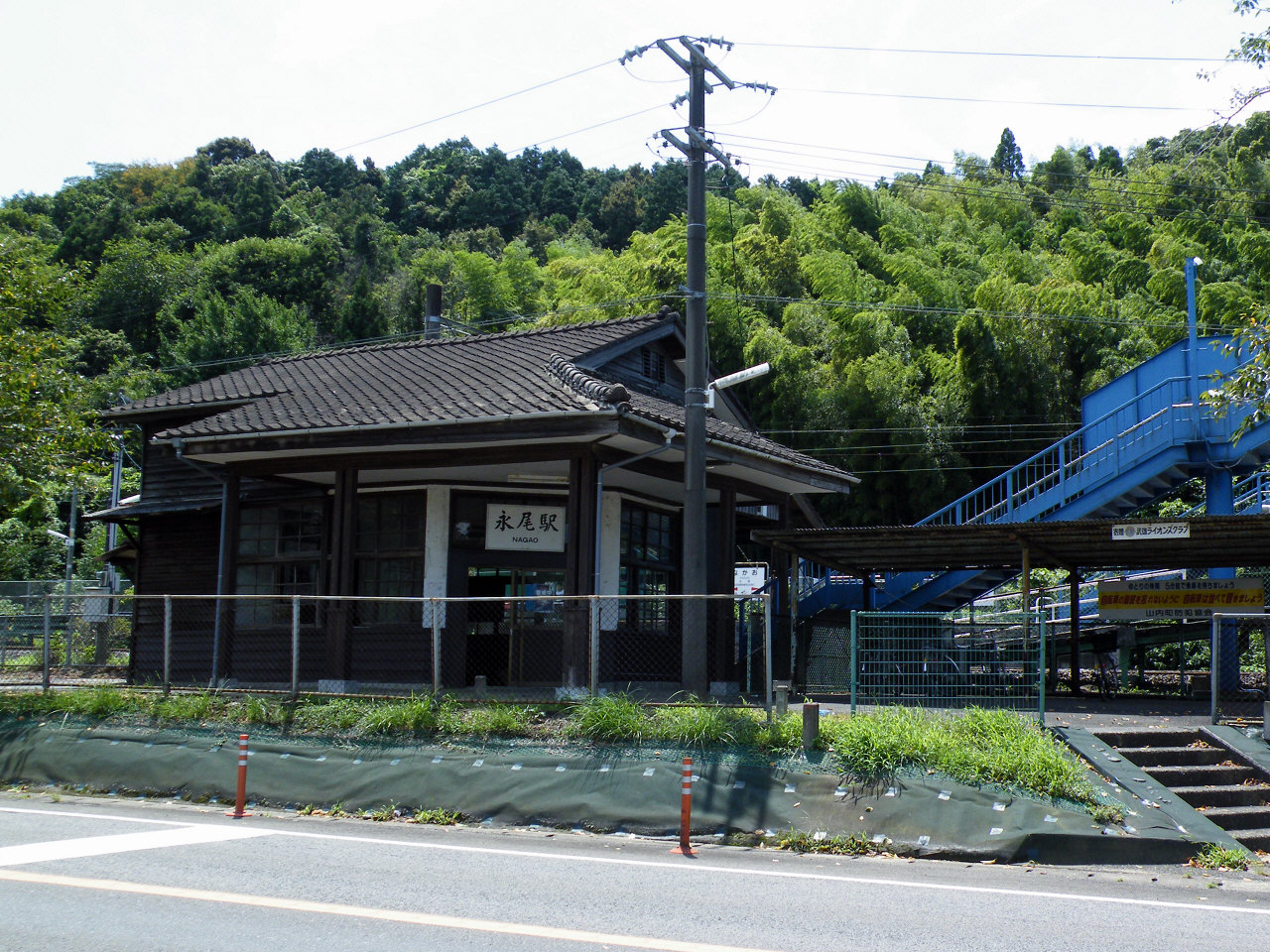
- Nagao Station in 2008

General information
- Location: Yamauchicho Oaza Inubashiri, Takeo-shi, Saga-ken 849-2301; Japan
- Coordinates: 33°11′36″N 129°58′49″E
- Operator: JR Kyushu
- Line: ■ Sasebo Line
- Distance: 18.3 km from Hizen-Yamaguchi
- Platforms: 2 side platforms
- Tracks: 2

Construction
- Structure type: At grade
- Accessible: No – platforms linked by footbridge

Other information
- Status: Unstaffed
- Website: Official website

History
- Opened: 30 September 1942

Passengers
- FY2015: 55 daily

Services
Preceding station	JR Kyushu	Following station
Mimasaka towards Sasebo	Sasebo Line	Takeo-Onsen towards Kōhoku
Location
- Location within Saga Prefecture Location within Japan

Nagao Station (永尾駅, Nagao-eki) is a passenger railway station located in the Yamauchi neighborhood of the city of Takeo, Saga Prefecture, Japan. It is operated by JR Kyushu.

== Lines ==
The station is served by the Sasebo Line and is located 18.3 km from the starting point of the line at Hizen-Yamaguchi. Only Sasebo Line local services stop at this station.

== Station layout ==
The station, which is unstaffed, consists of two staggered side platforms serving two tracks. The station building is a timber structure which is presently unstaffed and serves only as a waiting room. Access to the opposite side platform is by means of a footbridge.

=== Platforms ===
1	■ Sasebo Line	for Takeo-Onsen and Tosu
2	■ Sasebo Line	for Arita, Isahaya and Sasebo

== History ==
Japanese Government Railways (JGR) opened the station on 30 September 1942 as Nagao signal box on the existing track of the Sasebo Line. On 15 January 1949, the facility was upgraded to a full station and passenger services commenced. With the privatization of Japanese National Railways (JNR), the successor of JGR, on 1 April 1987, control of the station passed to JR Kyushu.

== Passenger statistics ==
In fiscal 2015, there were a total of 19,957 boarding passengers, giving a daily average of 55 passengers.

== Surrounding area ==
- Japan National Route 35

== See also ==
- List of railway stations in Japan
