= Fukudomi, Saga =

Fukudomi Town 福富町
- Former municipality
- Location in Japan
- Coordinates: 33.1819°N 130.1891°E
- Country: Japan
- Region: Kyushu
- Prefecture: Saga Prefecture
- District: Kishima
- Merged: January 1, 2005 (now part of Shiroishi)

Area
  - Total: 20.55 km^{2} (7.93 sq mi)

Population (March 3, 2003)
  - Total: 5,686
  - Density: 276.69/km^{2} (716.6/sq mi)
- Time zone: UTC+09:00 (JST)
- Website: www.town.shiroishi.lg.jp

Fukudomi (福富町, Fukudomi-machi) was a town located in Kishima District, Saga Prefecture, Japan.

On January 1, 2005, Fukudomi, along with the town of Ariake (also from Kishima District), was merged into the expanded town of Shiroishi.
