= E48 particulate bomb =

The E48 particulate bomb was a U.S. biological sub-munition designed during the 1950s for use with the E96 cluster bomb.

== History ==
In February 1950 a U.S. Army report prepared by William Creasy, a colonel within the U.S. bio-weapons program, noted that the E48 particulate bomb was in its final stages of development. Creasy also reported that the E48 had been successfully tested in three field trials.

== Specifications ==
The E48 particulate bomb was a 4-pound (2 kg) sub-munition meant to be clustered in the E38 type cluster adapter, together the E48 and E38 constituted the E96 cluster bomb. In practice, the E96 and its payload of E48 sub-munitions was intended to be air-dropped from 35,000 feet (11,000 m). The weapon could generate an elliptical aerosol agent cloud from this altitude that had major axes of 3,000 and 8,000 feet (910 and 2,440 m). Some of the agents considered for use with the E48 included, B. suis, anthrax, and botulin.

== Tests involving the E48 ==
The E48 sub-munition was utilized in tests at Dugway Proving Ground in July and August 1950. The July tests released Bacillus globigii from the E48 using air-dropped cluster bombs. The August tests utilized the bacteria Serratia marcescens, and involved E48s which dispersed the agent statically, from the ground.
