= Shiroishi, Saga =

Shiroishi 白石町
- Town
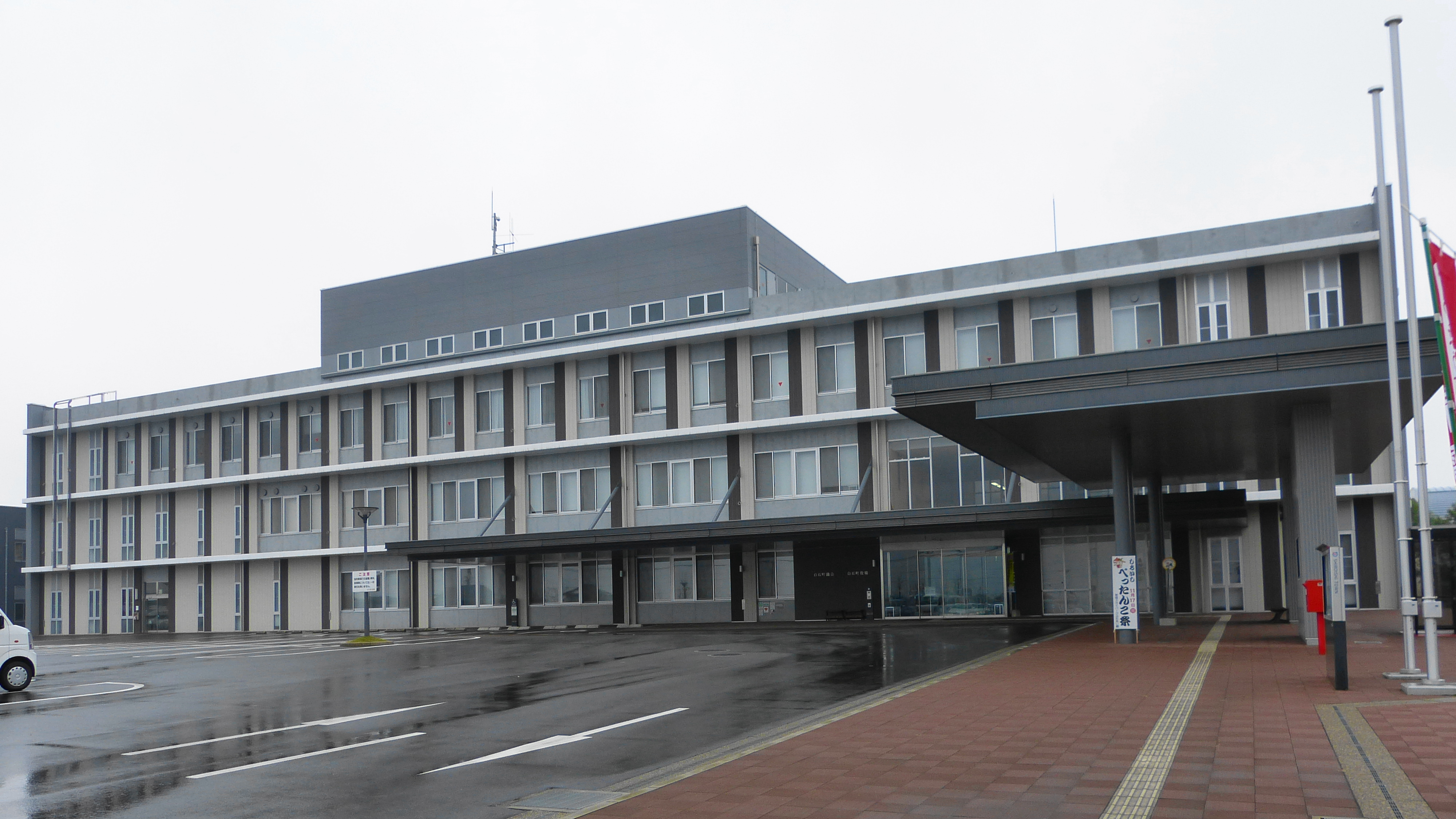
- Shiroishi town hall

- Flag Seal
- Location of Shiroishi in Saga Prefecture

- Location in Japan
- Coordinates: 33°10′53″N 130°8′36″E
- Country: Japan
- Region: Kyushu
- Prefecture: Saga
- District: Kishima

Government
  - Mayor: Hiroaki Katafuchi

Area
  - Total: 99.56 km^{2} (38.44 sq mi)

Population (May 1, 2024)
  - Total: 20,790
  - Density: 208.8/km^{2} (540.8/sq mi)
- Time zone: UTC+09:00 (JST)
- City hall address: 253-1 Ōaza Sakata, Shiroishi-chō, Kishima-gun, Saga-ken 849-1292
- Climate: Cfa
- Website: Official website
- Symbols
- Flower: Iris
- Tree: Sweet Osmanthus

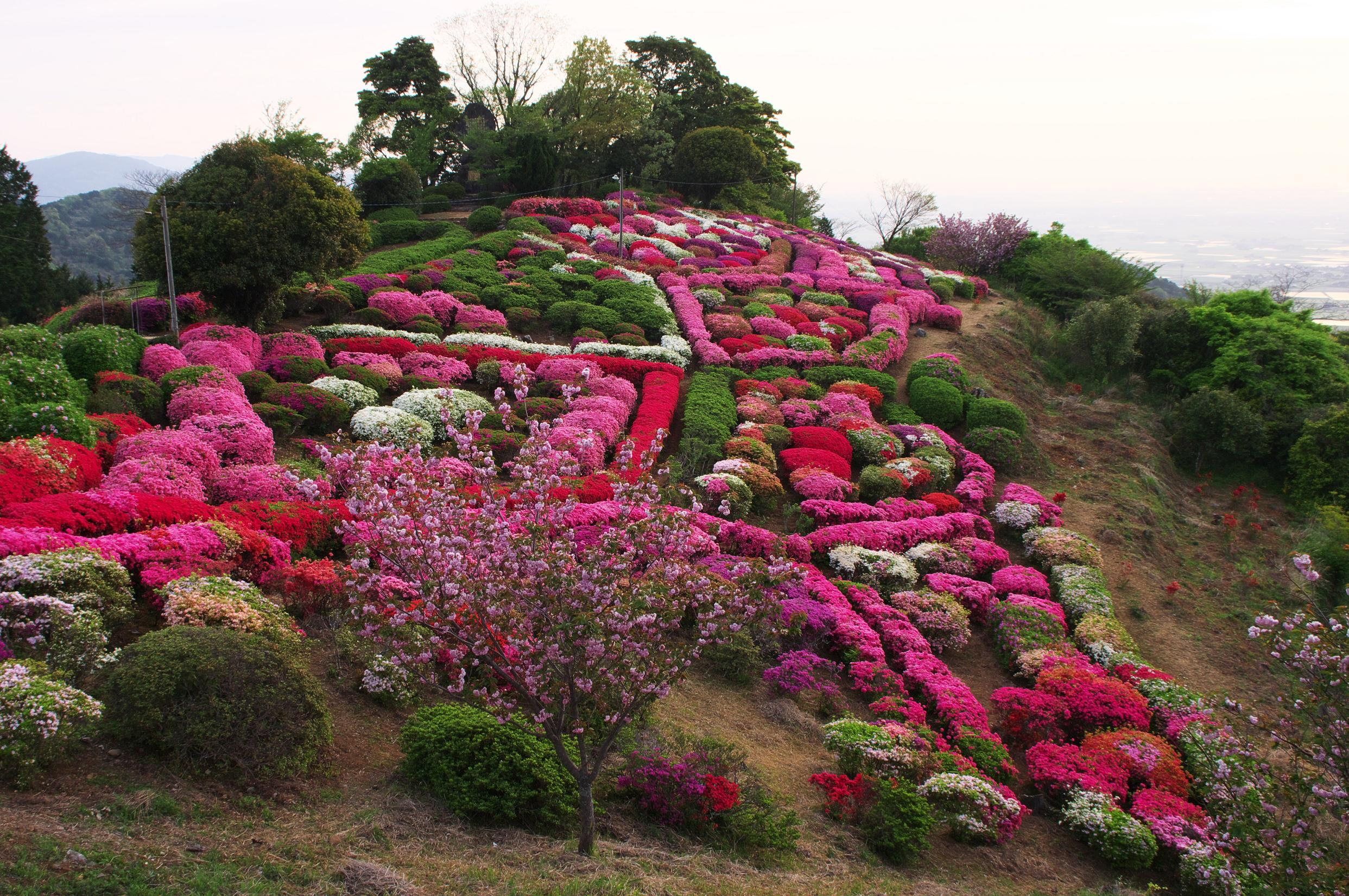
Utagaki Park in Shiroishi

Shiroishi (白石町, Shiroishi-chō) is a town located in south-central Saga Prefecture, Japan, in Kishima District. It is known for its vast reclaimed land and tidal flats of the Ariake Sea.As of 31 May 2024, the town had an estimated population of 20,790, and a population density of 210 persons per km². The total area of the town is 99.56 km^{2} (38.44 sq mi)

== Geography ==
Located in the Saga plains, Shiroishi is bordered by the Ariake Sea to the southeast. The port of Suminoe Bay, in the mouth of the Rokkaku River, has the largest tidal range in Japan with a maximum of about 6m at spring tide.

- Mountains: Mt. Kishima (345m), Mt. Inuyama (342m), Mt. Shiraiwa (340m), Mt. Iimori (318m)
- Rivers: Rokkaku River, Shioda River, Marie River, Tadae River
- Lakes: Nuinoike, Kasegawaike
- 85% of the total area of cultivated land is farmland.

=== Adjoining municipalities ===
Saga Prefecture

- Kashima
- Kōhoku
- Ogi
- Ōmachi
- Takeo
- Ureshino

=== Climate ===
Shiroishi has a humid subtropical climate (Köppen Cfa) characterized by warm summers and cool winters with light to no snowfall. The average annual temperature in Shiroishi is 16.3 °C. The average annual rainfall is 1902 mm with September as the wettest month. The temperatures are highest on average in August, at around 27.1 °C, and lowest in January, at around 6.2 °C.

- Annual Mean Air Temperature: 16.3 °C (61.3 °F)
- Annual Mean Precipitation: about 1,902 mm (74.9 in)

Climate data for Shiroishi, Saga (1991−2020 normals, extremes 1977−present)
Month	Jan	Feb	Mar	Apr	May	Jun	Jul	Aug	Sep	Oct	Nov	Dec	Year
Record high °C (°F)	20.3 (68.5)	23.1 (73.6)	25.5 (77.9)	31.5 (88.7)	35.9 (96.6)	37.5 (99.5)	39.0 (102.2)	40.0 (104.0)	37.8 (100.0)	34.1 (93.4)	27.8 (82.0)	24.2 (75.6)	40.0 (104.0)
Mean daily maximum °C (°F)	9.9 (49.8)	11.5 (52.7)	15.1 (59.2)	20.5 (68.9)	25.5 (77.9)	28.0 (82.4)	31.3 (88.3)	32.7 (90.9)	29.1 (84.4)	24.2 (75.6)	18.1 (64.6)	12.2 (54.0)	21.5 (70.7)
Daily mean °C (°F)	5.0 (41.0)	6.2 (43.2)	9.6 (49.3)	14.5 (58.1)	19.3 (66.7)	23.1 (73.6)	27.0 (80.6)	27.6 (81.7)	23.8 (74.8)	18.1 (64.6)	12.3 (54.1)	7.0 (44.6)	16.1 (61.0)
Mean daily minimum °C (°F)	0.6 (33.1)	1.3 (34.3)	4.3 (39.7)	8.8 (47.8)	13.8 (56.8)	19.2 (66.6)	23.6 (74.5)	24.0 (75.2)	19.7 (67.5)	13.1 (55.6)	7.3 (45.1)	2.4 (36.3)	11.5 (52.7)
Record low °C (°F)	−9.6 (14.7)	−6.4 (20.5)	−4.3 (24.3)	−1.8 (28.8)	3.9 (39.0)	8.5 (47.3)	15.5 (59.9)	16.6 (61.9)	7.0 (44.6)	1.5 (34.7)	−1.5 (29.3)	−5.4 (22.3)	−9.6 (14.7)
Average precipitation mm (inches)	53.7 (2.11)	71.3 (2.81)	109.8 (4.32)	145.1 (5.71)	154.9 (6.10)	309.5 (12.19)	354.0 (13.94)	219.4 (8.64)	171.2 (6.74)	88.8 (3.50)	85.9 (3.38)	59.4 (2.34)	1,822.8 (71.76)
Average precipitation days (≥ 1.0 mm)	8.1	8.3	10.1	9.3	8.9	13.2	12.9	10.0	9.0	6.2	8.2	7.8	112
Mean monthly sunshine hours	117.3	128.1	158.3	177.9	187.2	115.4	161.7	199.6	159.7	168.6	139.8	121.2	1,834.7
Source: JMA

== Demographics ==
27.01% of the population (7,437) are 65 or older. In 2005 there were 183 births and 322 deaths, 624 immigrants and 805 emigrants, indicating a negative population growth. Per Japanese census data, the population of Ōmachi is as shown below.

Historical population
Year	Pop.	±%
1960	40,203	—
1970	34,694	−13.7%
1980	31,790	−8.4%
1990	30,539	−3.9%
2000	28,393	−7.0%
2010	25,613	−9.8%
2020	22,051	−13.9%

== History ==
The area of Shiroishi is part of ancient Hizen Province. During the Edo period it was part of the holdings of Saga Domain, with a small portion under Hasuike Domain until the Meiji restoration. The villages of Hashishita, Fukudomi, Fukuji, Kinkō, Kita-Ariake, Minami-Ariake, Rokkaku, Ryūō, and Suko were established on April 1, 1889 with the creation of the modern municipalities system. Fukuji was elevated to town status on April 1, 1936 and renamed Shiroishi. On April 1, 1955 Kinkō and Ryūō merged to form Ariake. On July 20, 1955 Rokkaku and Suko were incorporated into Shiroishi, followed by Kita-Ariake on July 1, 1956. Ariake was elevated to town status on October 1, 1962, followed by Fukudome on April 1, 1967. On January 1, 2005 the towns of Shiroishi, merged with Fukudomi, and Ariake.

== Government ==
Shiroishi has a mayor-council form of government with a directly elected mayor and a unicameral town council of 16 members. Shiroishi, together with the other municipalities in Kishima District contributes two members to the Saga Prefectural Assembly. In terms of national politics, the town is part of the Saga 2nd district of the lower house of the Diet of Japan.

== Economy ==
Shiroishi is a very agricultural community. Some of their agricultural products include tempe, renkon, strawberries, onions, rice, and beef.

== Education ==
Shiroishi has eight public elementary schools and one public junior high school operated by the town government, and two public high schools operated by the Saga Prefectural Board of Education.

=== High schools ===
(prefectural)

- Saga Agricultural School
- Shiroishi High School

=== Junior high schools ===
- Shiroishi Junior High School

=== Elementary schools ===
- Ariake East Elementary School
- Ariake South Elementary School
- Ariake West Elementary School
- Fukudomi Elementary School
- Hokumei Elementary School
- Rokkaku Elementary School
- Shiroishi Elementary School
- Suko Elementary School

== Transportation ==
=== Railway ===
JR Kyushu - Nagasaki Main Line

JH Hizen-Shiroishi - Hizen-Ryūō

=== Highways ===
- National Route 207
- National Route 444

== Local attractions ==
- Fukudomi My Land Park (ふくどみマイランド公園, fukudomi mairando kouen) a park and playground.
- Inasa Shrine (稲佐神社, inasa jinja), an old shrine in the mountains west of Shiroishi. Of particular note is the stone paved road leading to the shrine.
- Suko Castle, A castle ruin in the Sengoku period. Ryūzōji Takanobu's residence.
- Utagaki Park (歌垣公園, utagaki kouen), a park with many flowers.

=== Festivals ===
- Yasaka Shrine Summer Festival (八坂神社 夏祭り, yasakajinja natsumatsuri), July 13 - Floats are pulled down the main shopping district in the tradition of the Kyoto Gion Festival.
- Hassaku (八朔), October 1 - A fall festival celebrating the sea at Kaidou Shrine.
- Okunchi (おくんち), October 19 - This fall festival is held at the Tsumayama, Rokkaku, Inasa, and Fukudomi shrines. It features Japanese horseback archery, called yabusame.
- Ohitaki Festival (お火たき祭り, ohitakimatsuri), December 26 - A bonfire festival where people pray for the coming year.

== Notable people from Shioishi ==
- Ryosuke Kagawa, actor
- Ariake Kambara, poet
- Kazuhiro Maeda, marathon runner
- Nobuyoshi Mutō, general in the Imperial Japanese Army
- Yorozu Oda, judge
- Hiroshi Ogushi, politician
