= Nagasaki Expressway =

Expressway in Nagasaki and Saga prefecture, Japan

Nagasaki Expressway
- 長崎自動車道

Route information
- Length: 120.4 km (74.8 mi)
- Existed: 1973–present

Major junctions
- From: Tosu Junction in Tosu; Kyushu Expressway; Ōita Expressway
- To: Nagasaki Interchange in Nagasaki; Nagasaki Dejima Road

Location
- Country: Japan
- Major cities: Saga, Takeo, Omura, Isahaya

Highway system
- National highways of Japan; Expressways of Japan

Nagasaki Expressway (長崎自動車道, Nagasaki Jidōsha-dō) is one of the Expressways of Japan from Tosu to Nagasaki. It runs through the prefecture of Saga, and the southern half of the Nagasaki prefecture. The total length is 120.4 km.

== History ==
- November 16, 1973, Tosu Interchange and Junction with the Kyushu Expressway to Nankan was open to traffic.
- November 17, 1982, a section from Nagasaki-Tarami to Omura Interchanges was opened to traffic.
- March 28, 1985, a section from Saga-Yamato to Tosu Interchanges was opened to traffic.
- February 5, 1987, the Tosu Junction in the east was opened.
- March 18, 1987, a section from Takeo-Kitagata to Saga-Yamato Interchanges was opened to traffic.
- January 26, 1990, a section from Omura to Takeo-Kitagata was opened to traffic which made the Nagasaki Expressway from Tosu to Nagasaki fully accessible with no gaps.
- January 26, 1990, the Takeo Junction was opened to traffic with another freeway.
- December 18, 1997, the tunnel from Higashisonogi to Ureshino Interchanges which made the Nagasaki Expressway with four lanes.
- March 24, 2001, the Sagan Cross Bridge in the Tosu Junction was opened to traffic which allowed access to the bridge with the Kyushu Expressway.
- March 27, 2004, a section from Nagasaki to Nagasaki-Tarami Interchanges was opened with another freeway.
- June 28, 2019, a section from Nagasaki-Tarami to Nagasaki-Susukizuka Interchanges which made Nagasaki Expressway with four lanes.

== Interchanges ==
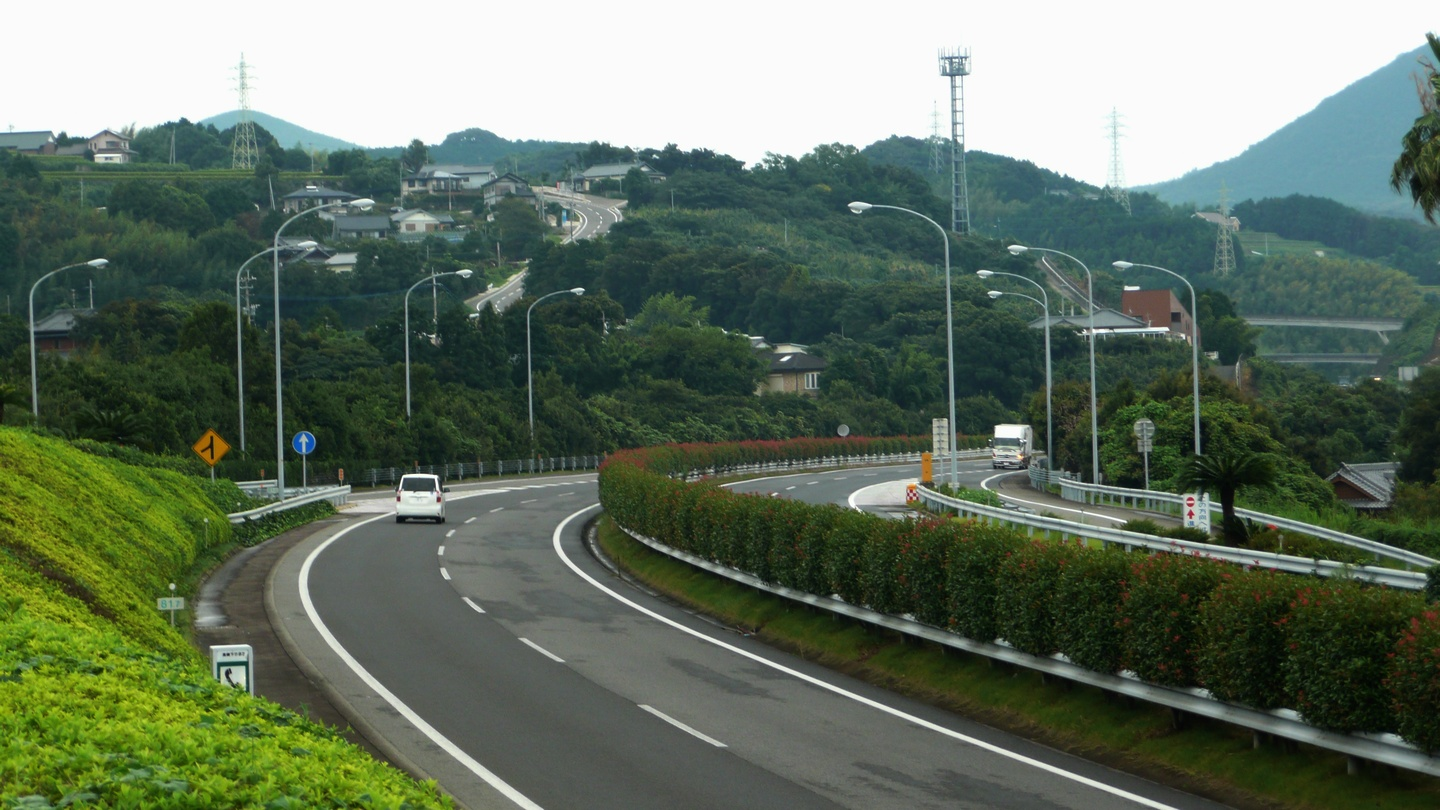
Higashisonogi, Nagasaki, Japan

- IC - interchange, JCT - junction, SA - service area, PA - parking area, BS - bus stop, TN - tunnel, BR - bridge, TB - toll gate
- Bus stops labeled "○" are currently in use; those marked "◆" are closed.

No.	Name	Connections	Dist. from Origin	Bus stop	Notes	Location	
(9)	Tosu JCT	Kyushu Expressway; Ōita Expressway	0.0			Tosu	Saga
1	Tosu IC	National Route 3 National Route 34	1.2			Tosu	Saga
BS	Kōnoe BS		3.3	○		Tosu	Saga
PA	Yamaura PA		5.7			Tosu	Saga
BS	Nakabaru BS		10.6	○		Miyaki	Saga
2	Higashisefuri IC	National Route 385	14.8			Yoshinogari	Saga
BS	Kanzaki BS		17.3	○		Kanzaki	Saga
SA	Kinryū SA		23.3	○		Saga	Saga
3	Saga-Yamato IC	National Route 263	26.6	◆		Saga	Saga
3-1	Ogi PA/SIC	Pref. Route 44 (Ogi Fuji Route) via Ogi city road	33.4	◆		Ogi	Saga
4	Taku IC	National Route 203 (Higashi-Taku Bypass)	41.7	◆		Taku	Saga
BS	Taku Seibyō BS		46.1	◆		Taku	Saga
PA	Taku-Nishi PA		47.0; 48.1		for Fukuoka, Kumamoto and Oita for Nagasaki	Taku	Saga
5	Takeo-Kitagata IC	National Route 34	52.9	◆		Takeo	Saga
SA	Kawanobori SA		61.9	◆		Takeo	Saga
6	Takeo JCT	Nishi-Kyūshū Expressway	64.3			Takeo	Saga
7	Ureshino IC	Pref. Route 1 (Sasebo Ureshino Route)	68.8	○		Ureshino	Saga
TN	Tawarazaka TN		-		northbound: 2,656 m (8,714 ft) southbound: 2,610 m (8,560 ft)	Ureshino	Saga
TN	Tawarazaka TN		-		northbound: 2,656 m (8,714 ft) southbound: 2,610 m (8,560 ft)	Higashisonogi	Nagasaki
8	Higashisonogi IC	National Route 34; National Route 205	78.6	◆		Higashisonogi	Nagasaki
PA	Omura-wan PA		81.6			Higashisonogi	Nagasaki
BS	Matsubara BS		85.4	○		Omura	Nagasaki
9	Omura IC	National Route 444	92.1	○		Omura	Nagasaki
	Emergency Exit				Access for National Hospital Organization Nagasaki Medical Center; Authorized vehicles only	Omura	Nagasaki
9-1	Koba PA/SIC		95.4	○	PA:Only accessible for Nagasaki	Omura	Nagasaki
PA	Imamura PA		100.6	○	Only accessible for Fukuoka, Kumamoto and Oita	Omura	Nagasaki
10	Isahaya IC	National Route 34; Pref. Route 125 (Isahaya Soto Kanjosen)	104.2	○		Isahaya	Nagasaki
11	Nagasaki-Tarami IC	Nagasaki Bypass	109.1			Isahaya	Nagasaki
11	Nagasaki-Tarami IC	Nagasaki Bypass	109.1			Nagasaki	Nagasaki
12	Nagasaki-Susukizuka IC	Pref. Route 116 (Nagasaki-Susukizuka Interchange Route)	117.4		Only accessible for Fukuoka, Kumamoto and Oita	Nagasaki	Nagasaki
13	Nagasaki IC	National Route 324; Nagasaki Dejima Road; Pref. Route 51 (Nagasaki Minami Kanjosen)	120.4			Nagasaki	Nagasaki

== Lanes ==
- 4-lane, Tosu Junction to Nagasaki-Susukizuka Interchanges
- 2-lane, Nagasaki-Susukizuka to Nagasaki Interchanges
