= Ureshino, Saga =

Ureshino 嬉野市
- City
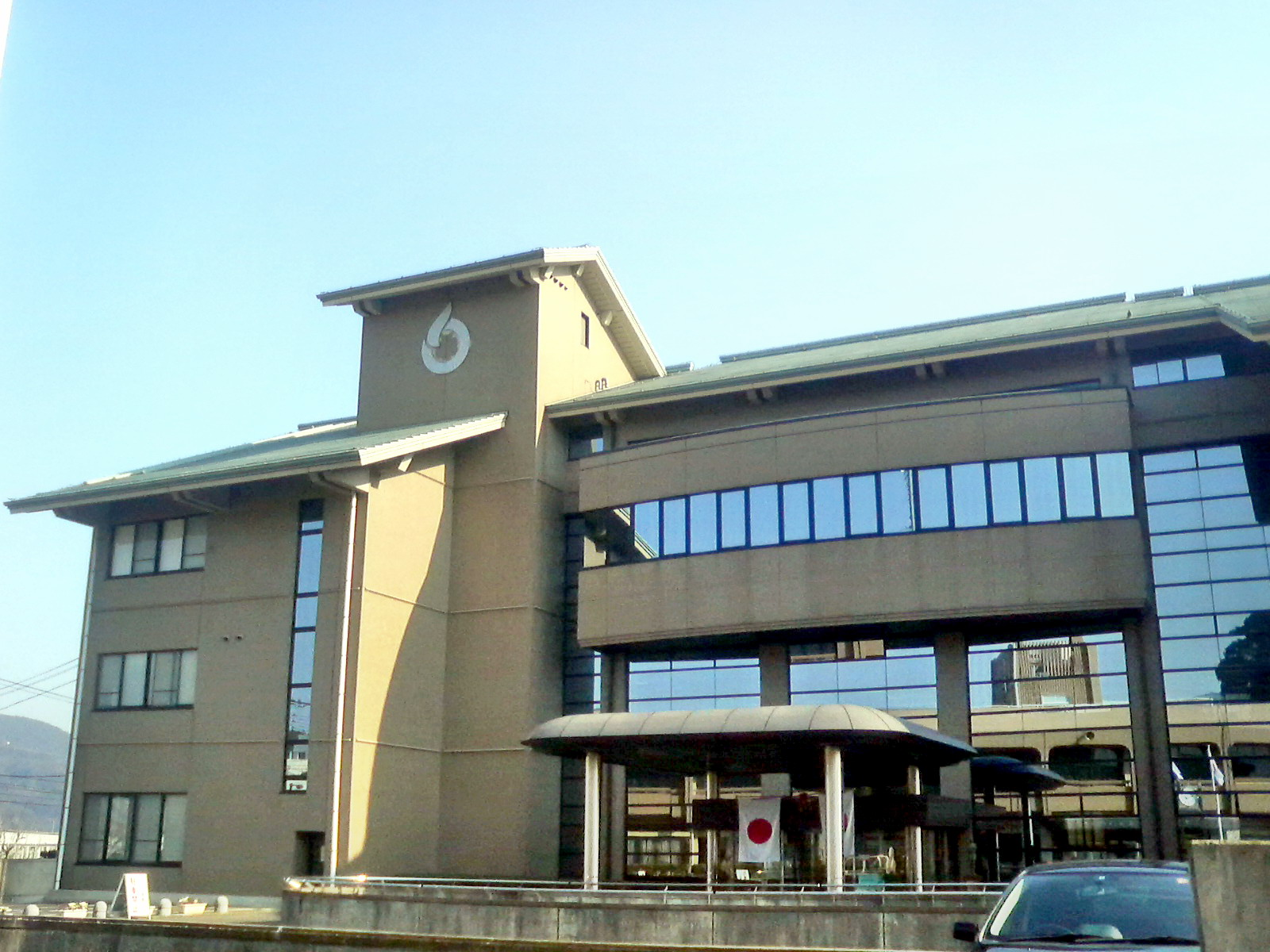
- Ureshino City Hall

- Flag Seal
- Location of Ureshino in Saga Prefecture

- Location in Japan
- Coordinates: 33°7′41″N 130°3′36″E
- Country: Japan
- Region: Kyushu
- Prefecture: Saga

Government
  - Mayor: Taichiro Taniguchi (since February 2006)

Area
  - Total: 126.41 km^{2} (48.81 sq mi)

Population (May 31, 2024)
  - Total: 24,529
  - Density: 194.04/km^{2} (502.57/sq mi)
- Time zone: UTC+09:00 (JST)
- City hall address: 1769 Babashitakō, Shiota-chō, Ureshino-shi, Saga-ken 849–1411
- Climate: Cfa
- Website: Official website
- Symbols
- Flower: Cherry blossom, Wisteria
- Tree: Camellia sinensis

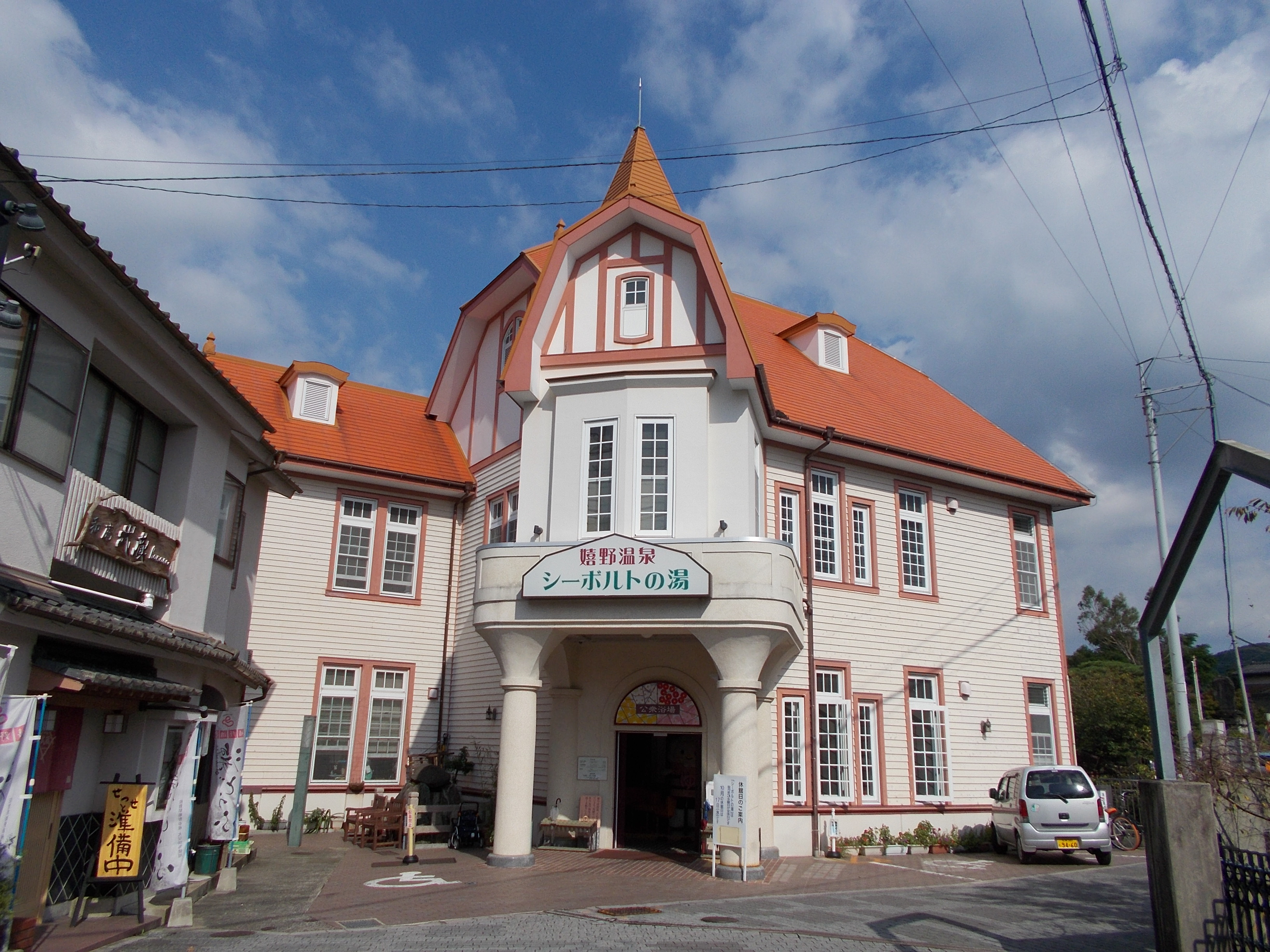
Ureshino Onsen

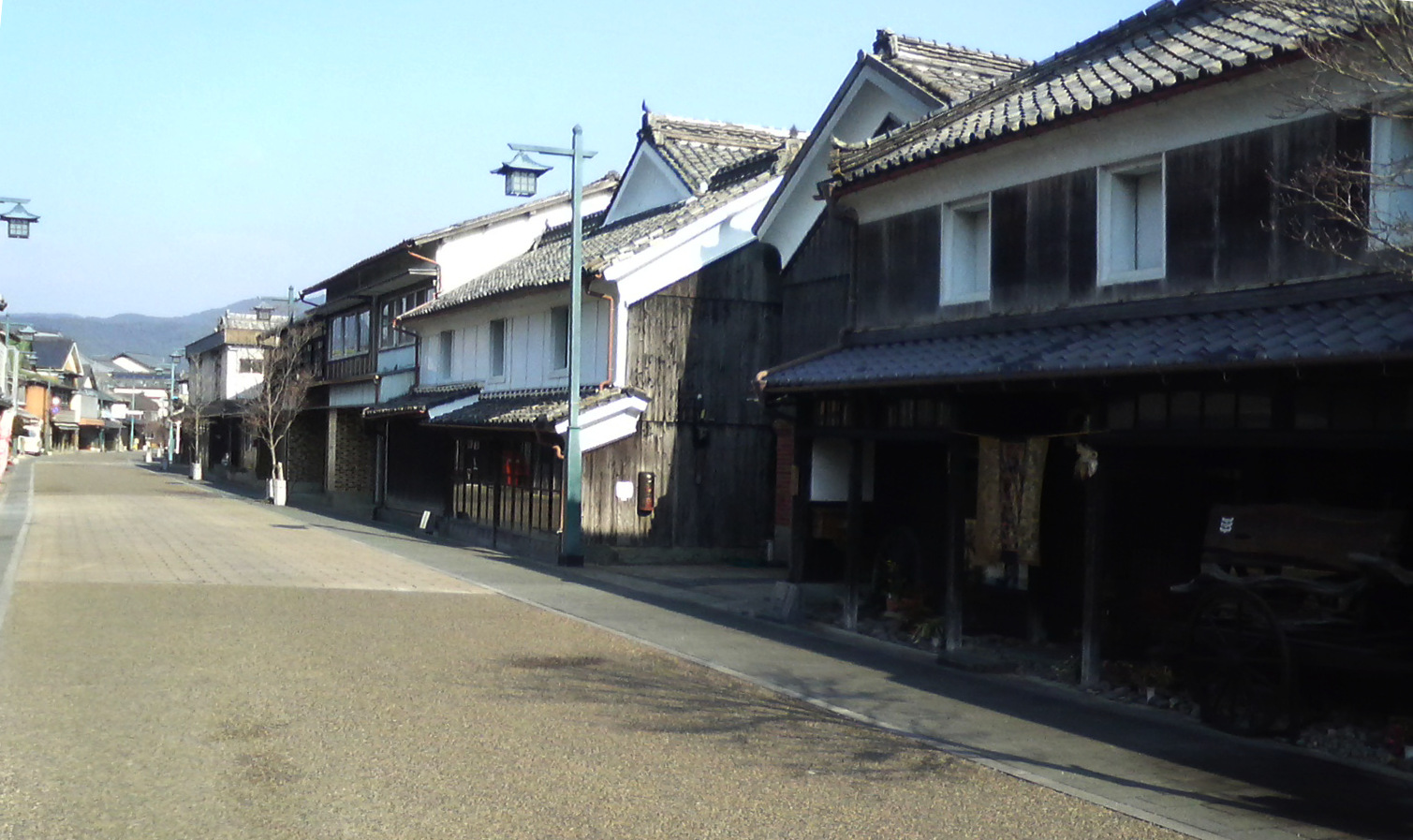
Shiodatsu Historical Preservation Area

Ureshino (嬉野市, Ureshino-shi; Japanese pronunciation: [ɯ̈̀.ɾé̞.ɕí.nó̞(.ɕì)]) is a city located in the western part of Saga Prefecture on the island of Kyushu, Japan. As of 31 May 2024, the city had an estimated population of 24,529 in 10075 households, and a population density of 190 persons per km^{2}. The total area of the city is 126.41 km^{2} (48.81 sq mi).

== Geography ==
Ureshino is located in southwestern Saga Prefecture, in a basin surrounded by relatively gentle mountains. Part of the eastern area belongs to the Shiroishi Plain.

=== Adjoining municipalities ===
Nagasaki Prefecture

- Hasami
- Higashisonogi
- Kawatana
- Ōmura

Saga Prefecture

- Kashima
- Shiroishi
- Takeo

=== Climate ===
Ureshino has a humid subtropical climate (Köppen Cfa) characterized by warm summers and cool winters with light to no snowfall. The average annual temperature in Ureshino is 15.9 °C. The average annual rainfall is 1864 mm with September as the wettest month. The temperatures are highest on average in August, at around 26.5 °C, and lowest in January, at around 5.9 °C.

Climate data for Ureshino (1991−2020 normals, extremes 1977−present)
Month	Jan	Feb	Mar	Apr	May	Jun	Jul	Aug	Sep	Oct	Nov	Dec	Year
Record high °C (°F)	19.5 (67.1)	22.1 (71.8)	24.7 (76.5)	29.8 (85.6)	34.2 (93.6)	35.8 (96.4)	38.5 (101.3)	39.8 (103.6)	37.3 (99.1)	32.5 (90.5)	27.9 (82.2)	23.2 (73.8)	39.8 (103.6)
Mean daily maximum °C (°F)	9.5 (49.1)	11.2 (52.2)	14.7 (58.5)	20.1 (68.2)	24.7 (76.5)	27.0 (80.6)	30.5 (86.9)	32.1 (89.8)	28.3 (82.9)	23.3 (73.9)	17.3 (63.1)	11.6 (52.9)	20.9 (69.6)
Daily mean °C (°F)	4.5 (40.1)	5.6 (42.1)	8.9 (48.0)	13.8 (56.8)	18.4 (65.1)	21.9 (71.4)	26.0 (78.8)	26.6 (79.9)	22.8 (73.0)	17.2 (63.0)	11.5 (52.7)	6.4 (43.5)	15.3 (59.5)
Mean daily minimum °C (°F)	0.2 (32.4)	0.7 (33.3)	3.6 (38.5)	8.0 (46.4)	12.8 (55.0)	18.0 (64.4)	22.5 (72.5)	22.8 (73.0)	18.7 (65.7)	12.3 (54.1)	6.8 (44.2)	1.9 (35.4)	10.7 (51.2)
Record low °C (°F)	−6.8 (19.8)	−7.3 (18.9)	−4.8 (23.4)	−2.2 (28.0)	4.2 (39.6)	8.3 (46.9)	12.9 (55.2)	15.5 (59.9)	5.8 (42.4)	1.2 (34.2)	−2.0 (28.4)	−5.6 (21.9)	−7.3 (18.9)
Average precipitation mm (inches)	71.5 (2.81)	96.1 (3.78)	152.7 (6.01)	194.1 (7.64)	207.4 (8.17)	396.7 (15.62)	400.6 (15.77)	277.7 (10.93)	227.9 (8.97)	111.6 (4.39)	109.4 (4.31)	78.2 (3.08)	2,323.7 (91.48)
Average precipitation days (≥ 1.0 mm)	8.6	8.6	10.8	10.2	9.5	14.2	13.7	11.4	9.8	6.5	8.4	8.3	120
Mean monthly sunshine hours	112.8	128.5	162.3	182.9	191.9	121.7	158.7	197.4	167.2	180.9	145.0	121.2	1,870.6
Source: JMA

=== Demographics ===
Per Japanese census data, the population of Ureshino is as shown below.

Historical population
Year	Pop.	±%
1940	27,487	—
1950	37,338	+35.8%
1960	36,252	−2.9%
1970	32,992	−9.0%
1980	32,759	−0.7%
1990	32,421	−1.0%
2000	31,324	−3.4%
2010	28,984	−7.5%
2020	25,848	−10.8%

== History ==
The area of Ureshino was part of ancient Hizen Province. During the Edo Period, it was part of the holdings of Saga Domain. Following the Meiji restoration, the villages of Gochōda, Higashiureshino, Kuma, Nishiureshino, Shiota and Yoshida were established on April 1,1 889 with the creation of the modern municipalities system. Shiota was elevated to town status on October 5, 1918. Nishiureshino was elevated to town status on April 1, 1929, and renamed Ureshino. The town of Ureshino annexed Higashiureshino on April 1, 1933, and Yoshida on April 1, 1955, whereas Shiota annexed Gochōda and Kuma on September 1, 1956. The city of Ureshino was formed on January 1, 2006, by the merger of the towns of Ureshino, and Shiota (both from Fujitsu District).

== Government ==
Ureshino has a mayor-council form of government with a directly elected mayor and a unicameral city council of 16 members. Ureshino contributes one member to the Saga Prefectural Assembly. In terms of national politics, the city is part of the Saga 2nd district of the lower house of the Diet of Japan.

== Economy ==
Ureshino is locally known for the green tea grown there and its hot spring resorts.

== Education ==
Ureshino has eight public elementary schools and four junior high schools operated by the city government and one public high school operated by the Saga Prefectural Board of Education. The prefecture also operates one special education school for the handicapped.

=== Prefectural senior high schools ===
- Ureshino High School

=== Municipal junior high schools ===
- Ōnohara Junior High School
- Shiota Junior High School
- Ureshino Junior High School
- Yoshida Junior High School

=== Municipal elementary schools ===
- Gochōda Elementary School
- Kuma Elementary School
- Ōkusano Elementary School
- Ōnohara Elementary School
- Shiota Elementary School
- Todoroki Elementary School
- Ureshino Elementary School
- Yoshida Elementary School

== Transport ==
=== Railway ===
JR Kyushu - Kyushu Shinkansen

Ureshino-Onsen

=== Highway ===
- Nagasaki Expressway (Ureshino Interchange)
- National Route 34
- National Route 498

== Local attractions ==
=== Hizen Yume Kaidō ===
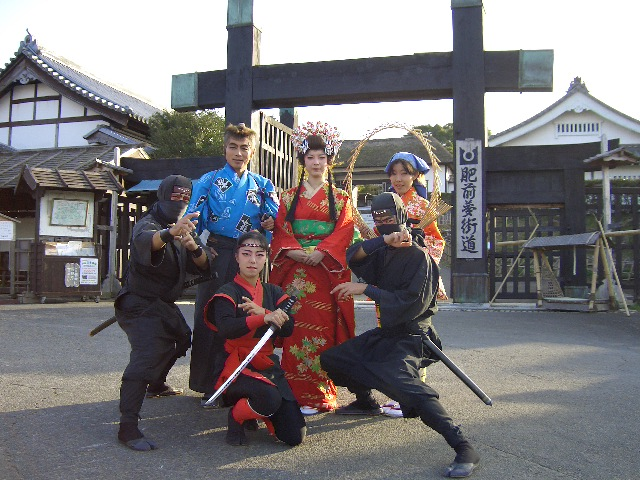
Hizen Yume Kaidō

This amusement park is a reproduction of a town along the Nagasaki Kaidō, a major route which ran through the region in the 17th century during the Edo period. There are dramatic shows that include samurai, ninjas and princesses, shown on the weekends.

=== Ureshino green tea ===
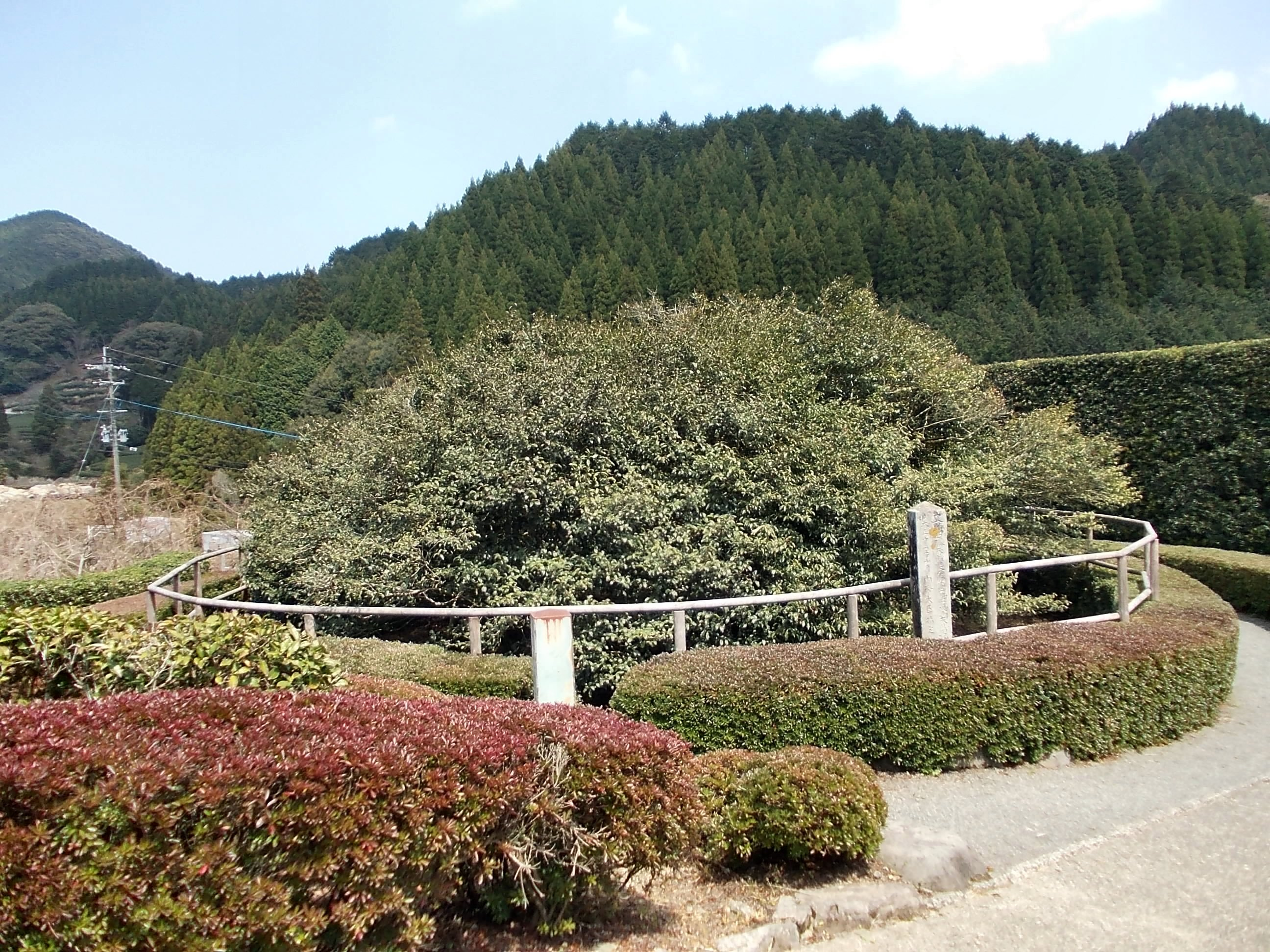
The Tea Tree at Mount Fudō

Ureshino is surrounded by tea plantations, and is known as one of the best producers of green-tea in Japan. The method of tea production dates back to 1504, when it was introduced from China during the Ming dynasty.

=== Ureshino Onsen Tofu ===
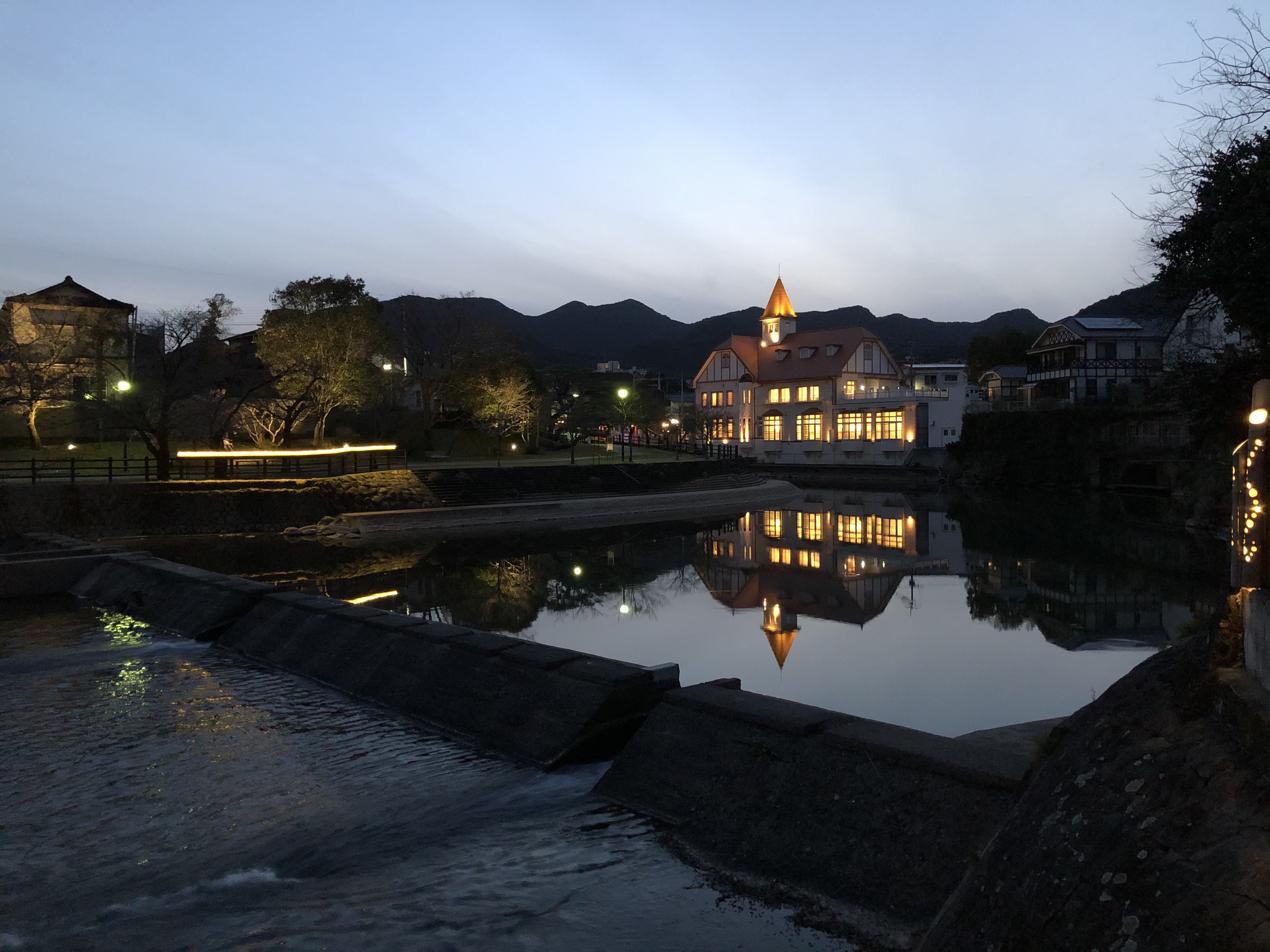
Ureshino onsen

Onsen water is used to make this local dish. The alkaline in the water makes the bean curd in the tofu soft and mellow when it is heated in ceramic pots. Onsen tofu is traditionally served with condiments such as green onion, ginger, and sesame paste to taste.

=== Ureshino Spa ===
The city boasts some of the region's best onsen, including Shibasansou, Taishoya, and Warakuen. There are currently over 40 spas in the area, both indoor and outdoor, ranging in size and water quality. Tourists may purchase a discount spa ticket from the local Tourist Information Office, located at the Ureshino Highway Interchange.

== Festivals and events ==
=== January ===
- Ureshino Onsen Health Road Race (嬉野温泉健康ロードレース大会)

=== February ===
- Ureshino Attaka Festival (うれしのあったかまつり)

=== April ===
- Ureshino Tea Mitto (うれしの茶ミット)
- Oyama-san Festival (お山さんまつり)

=== August ===
- Happy Carnival (うれしカーニバル)
- Ureshino Onsen Summer Festival (嬉野温泉夏まつり)

=== November ===
- Hachiman Shrine Festival (八幡宮例祭)
- Tanjō Shrine Shiota Kunchi (丹生神社例祭塩田くんち)

=== December ===
- Hachiten Shrine Grand Festival (八天神社例大祭)
