= Takeo, Saga =

Takeo 武雄市
- City
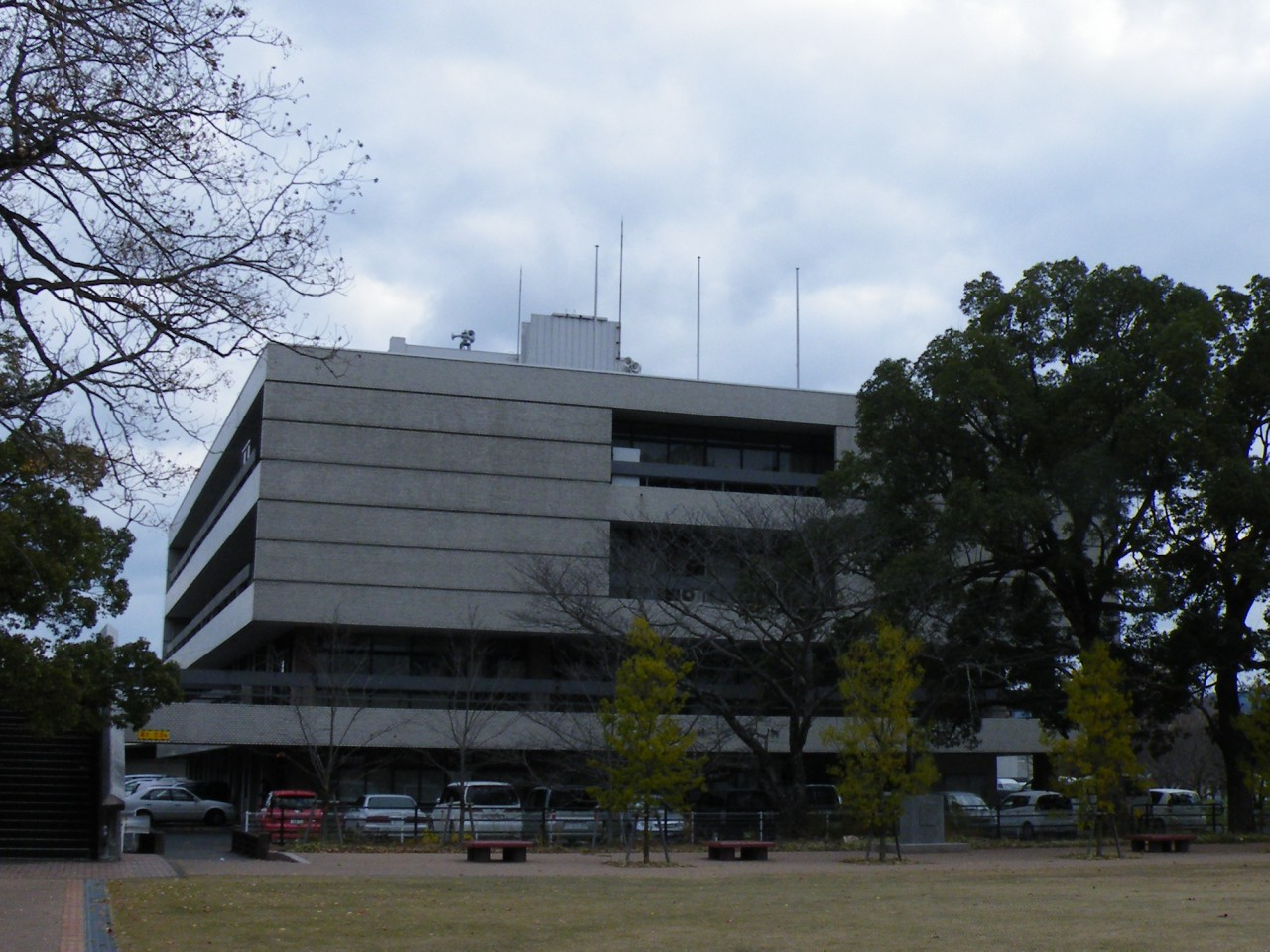
- Takeo City Hall

- Flag Seal
- Location of Takeo in Saga Prefecture

- Location in Japan
- Coordinates: 33°11′41″N 130°1′17″E
- Country: Japan
- Region: Kyushu
- Prefecture: Saga

Government
  - Mayor: Tadashi Komatu

Area
  - Total: 195.40 km^{2} (75.44 sq mi)

Population (May 31, 2024)
  - Total: 47,136
  - Density: 241.23/km^{2} (624.78/sq mi)
- Time zone: UTC+09:00 (JST)
- City hall address: 1-1 Ōaza Shōwa, Takeo-chō, Takeo-shi, Saga-ken 843-8639
- Website: Official website
- Symbols
- Flower: Rhododendron
- Tree: Cinnamomum camphora

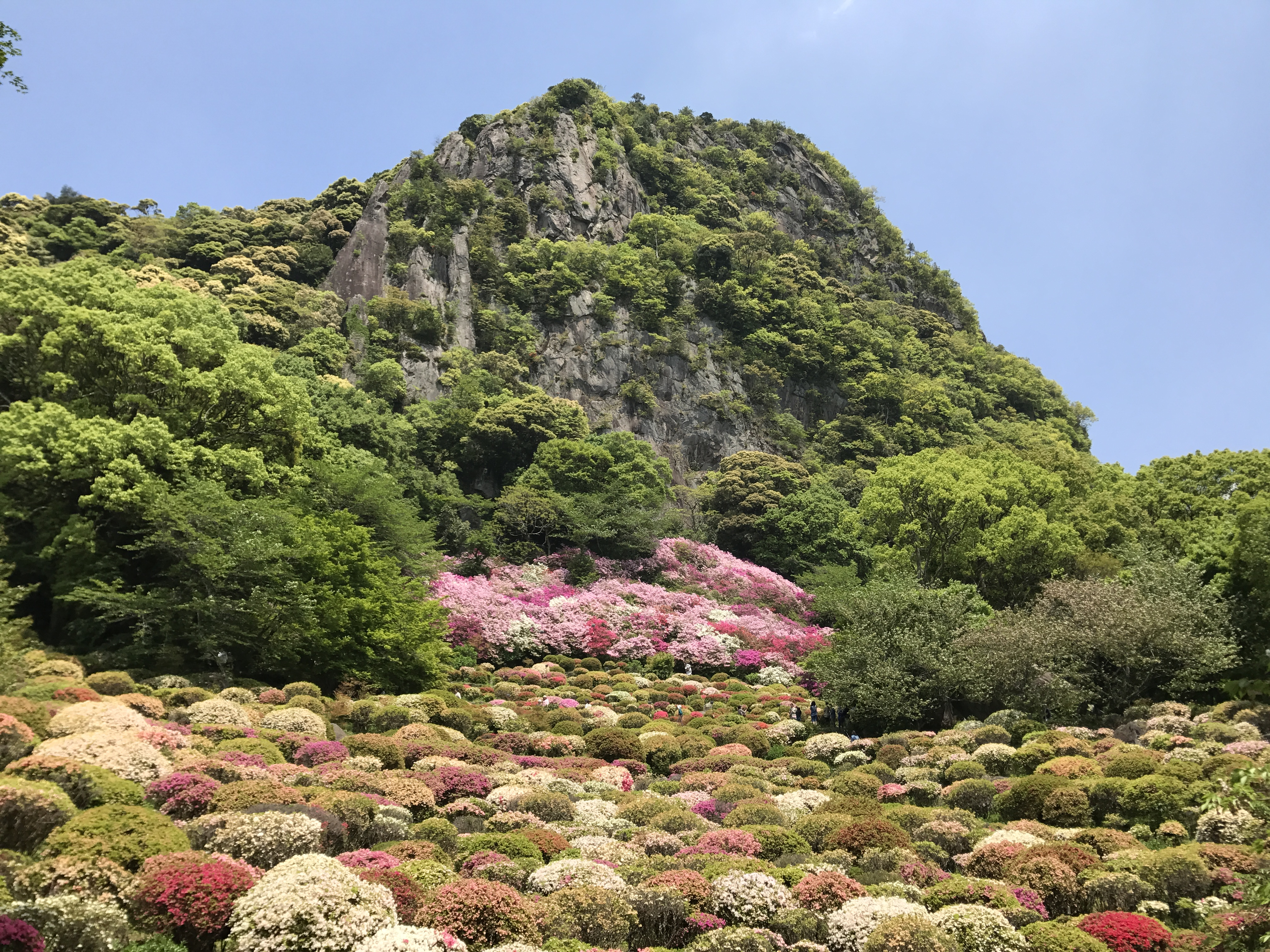
Mifuneyama Gardens

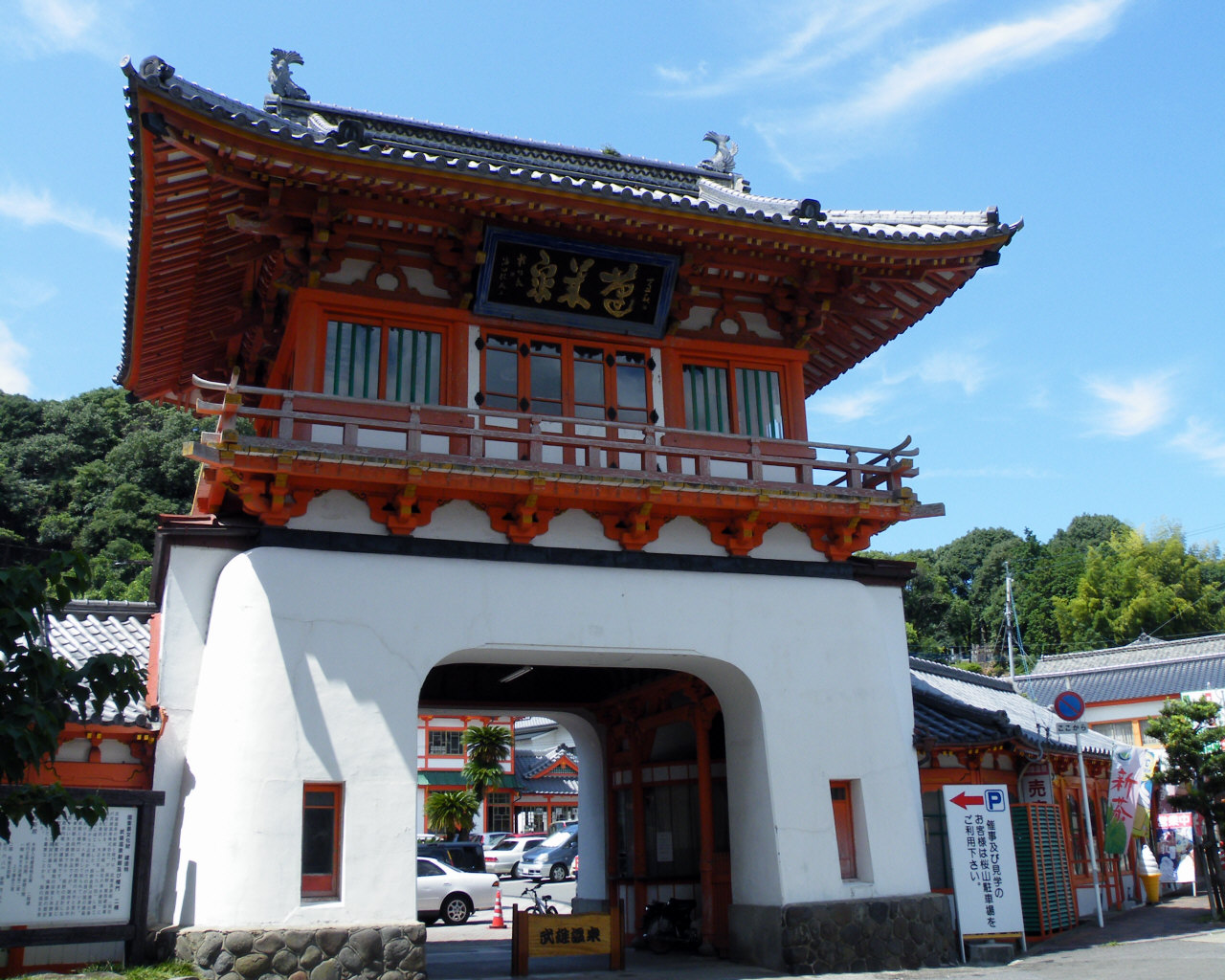
Takeo Onsen entrance

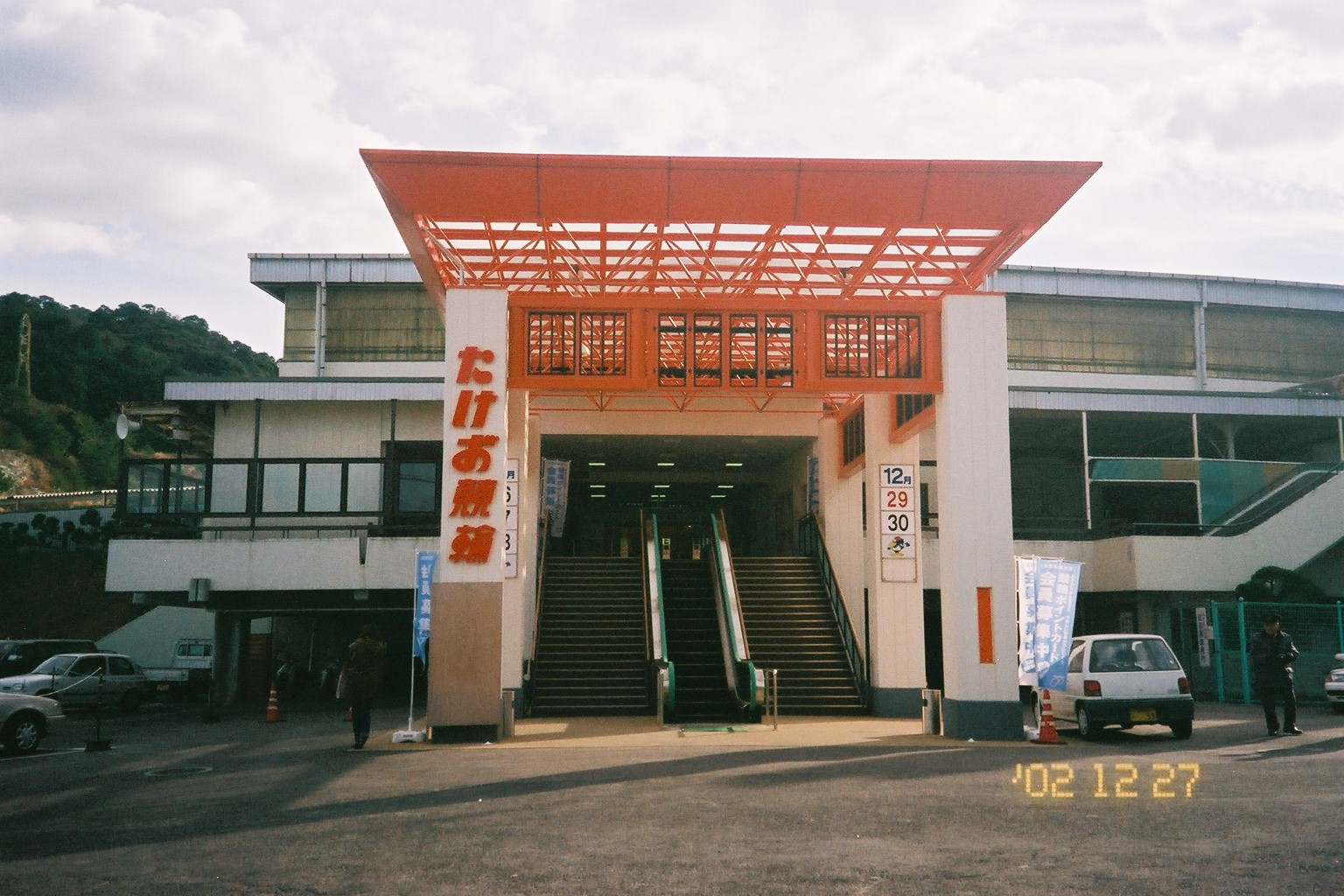
Takeo Velodrome

Takeo (武雄市, Takeo-shi) is a city located in Saga Prefecture on the island of Kyushu, Japan. As of 31 May 2024, the city had an estimated population of 47,136 in 19,207 households, and a population density of 240 persons per km^{2}. The total area of the city is 195.40 km^{2} (75.44 sq mi).

== Geography ==
Takeo is located in the western part of Saga Prefecture. It is approximately 28 kilometers (17 mi) west of Saga City and approximately 30 kilometers (19 mi) east of Sasebo. Takeo has a complex topography including mountains, mountain basins and riverside plains. The population is concentrated in the western end of the Takeo Basin in the southeastern part of the city, and in the basin on the western side of the city.

- Mountains: Mt. Mifune (210 m), Mt. Hachiman (764 m), Mt. Bi (518 m), Mt. Jinroku (447 m)
- Rivers: Rokkaku River, Shiomi River, Yamanaka River

=== Adjoining municipalities ===
Nagasaki Prefecture

- Hasami

Saga Prefecture

- Arita
- Imari
- Karatsu
- Ōmachi
- Shiroishi
- Taku
- Ureshino

=== Climate ===
Takeo has a humid subtropical climate (Köppen Cfa) characterized by warm summers and cool winters with light to no snowfall. The average annual temperature in Takeo is 16.1 °C. The average annual rainfall is 1864 mm with September as the wettest month. The temperatures are highest on average in August, at around 26.8 °C, and lowest in January, at around 5.9 °C.

=== Demographics ===
Per Japanese census data, the population of Takeo is as shown below.

Historical population
Year	Pop.	±%
1960	65,000	—
1970	53,997	−16.9%
1980	53,156	−1.6%
1990	54,004	+1.6%
2000	53,068	−1.7%
2010	50,699	−4.5%
2020	47,914	−5.5%

== History ==
The area of Takeo was part of ancient Hizen Province. During the Edo period it was mostly under Saga Domain ruled by the Nabeshima clan. Following the Meiji restoration, the town of Takeo and the villages of Asahi, Hashishita, Higashikawanobori, Kitagata, Kitsu, Nakato, Nishikawanobori, Sumiyoshi, Takeo, Takeuchi and Wakaki were established with the creation of the modern municipalities system in Kishima District, Saga. Takeo village and Takeo town merged on June 7, 1900. Kitamura was raised to town status on April 29, 1944. On April 1, 1954, Takeo annexed the villages of Asahi, Hashishita, Higashikawanobori, Nishikawanobori, Takeuchi and Wakagi and was raised to city status. On September 1, 1960, Yamauchi was raised to town status. On March 1, 2006, the towns of Kitagata and Yamauchi (both from Kishima District) were merged into Takeo.

== Government ==
Takeo has a mayor-council form of government with a directly elected mayor and a unicameral city council of 20 members. Takeo contributes two members to the Saga Prefectural Assembly. In terms of national politics, the city is part of the Saga 2nd district of the lower house of the Diet of Japan.

== Economy ==
About 23% of the city area is farmland, and agriculture is practiced throughout the city. The main agricultural product is rice, with wheat and soybeans also being cultivated. However, agricultural income has been declining year by year, and is the lowest among the cities in the prefecture. Combined with the aging of agricultural successors, the increase in abandoned farmland and the decline in agriculture have become serious problems.

Industry is centered around ceramics production and a number of kilns are located mainly in the old portion of the city. The former Yamauchi Town is adjacent to Arita, so there are many Arita ware (Imari ware) kilns. The city has a number of industrial parks.

The tertiary industry is centered on commerce and tourism due to Takeo Onsen and other hot springs.

== Education ==
Takeo has 11 public elementary schools and five junior high schools operated by the city government and one public junior high school and one public high school operated by the Saga Prefectural Board of Education.

=== High schools ===
- Saga Prefectural Takeo High School

=== Junior high schools ===
- Kawanobori Junior High School
- Kitagata Junior High School
- Seiryo Junior High School
- Takeo Junior High School
- Takeo Kita Junior High School
- Yamauchi Junior High School

=== Elementary schools ===
- Asahi Elementary School
- Higashikawanobori Elementary School
- Kitagata Elementary School
- Mifunegaoka Elementary School
- Nishikawanobori Elementary School
- Tachibana Elementary School
- Takeo Elementary School
- Takeuchi Elementary School
- Yamauchi Higashi Elementary School
- Wakaki Elementary School
- Yamauchi Nishi Elementary School

== Transport ==
=== Railway ===
JR Kyushu - Nishi Kyushu Shinkansen

Takeo-Onsen

JR Kyushu - Sasebo Line

■ Kitagata - Takahashi - Takeo-Onsen - Nagao - Mimasaka

=== Highways ===
- Nagasaki Expressway (Takeo-Kitagata Interchange - Kawanobori Service Area - Takeo Junction)
- Nagasaki Expressway (Takeo Junction - Takeo Minami Interchange)
- National Route 34
- National Route 35
- National Route 498

== Sister cities ==
- Sebastopol, California, United States, friendship city since 1985

== Local attractions ==
- Chūō Park
- Daishō-ji
- Kitagata Shiki no Oka Park
- Keishūen Garden, Yōkō Museum
- Kurokami no Roman festival
- Mifunegaoka Plum Grove
- Mifuneyama Garden
- Mount Kurokami, Fūfu Rock
- Otsuboyama Kōgoishi, National Historic Site
- Saga Prefectural Space and Science Museum
- Takeo Jinja
- Takeo Onsen
- Takeo Velodrome

== Notable people from Takeo ==
- Keisuke Hiwatashi, former mayor
- Taizo Ichinose, war photographer
- Yoshiko Yamaguchi, 1930s-late 1940s Singer and Actress in China
