= Kitagata Station (Saga) =

Railway station in Takeo, Saga Prefecture, Japan

Kitagata Station 北方駅
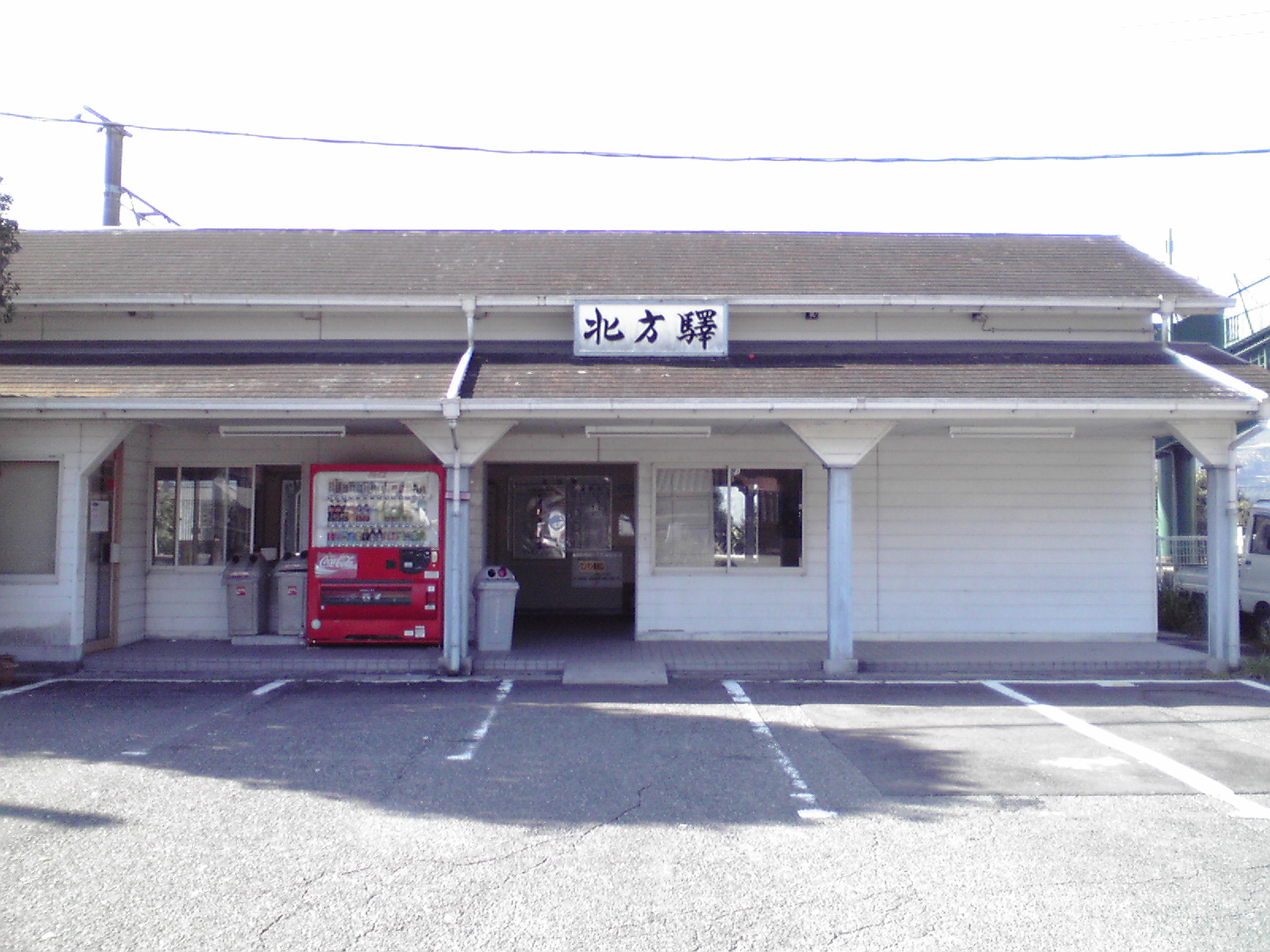
- Kitagata Station in 2010

General information
- Location: Kitagatacho Oaza Shiku, Takeo-shi, Saga-ken 849-2201; Japan
- Coordinates: 33°12′59″N 130°04′58″E
- Operator: JR Kyushu
- Line: ■ Sasebo Line
- Distance: 7.4 km from Hizen-Yamaguchi
- Platforms: 1 side + 1 island platforms
- Tracks: 3 + 2 sidings

Construction
- Structure type: At grade
- Accessible: No – platforms accessed by footbridge

Other information
- Status: Unstaffed
- Website: Official website

History
- Opened: 5 May 1895

Passengers
- FY2015: 100 daily

Services
| Preceding station | JR Kyushu | Following station |
|---|---|---|
| Takahashi towards Sasebo | Sasebo Line | Ōmachi towards Kōhoku |
Location
- Location within Saga Prefecture Location within Japan

Kitagata Station (北方駅, Kitagata-eki) is a passenger railway station located in the Kitagata neighborhood of the city of Takeo, Saga Prefecture, Japan. It is operated by JR Kyushu.

== Lines ==
The station is served by the Sasebo Line and is located 7.4 km from the starting point of the line at Hizen-Yamaguchi. Only Sasebo Line local services stop at this station.

== Station layout ==
The station, which is unstaffed, consists of a side platform and an island platform serving three tracks. Sidings branch off tracks 1 and 3. The station building is a timber structure which presently serves only as a waiting room. Access to the island platform is by means of a footbridge.

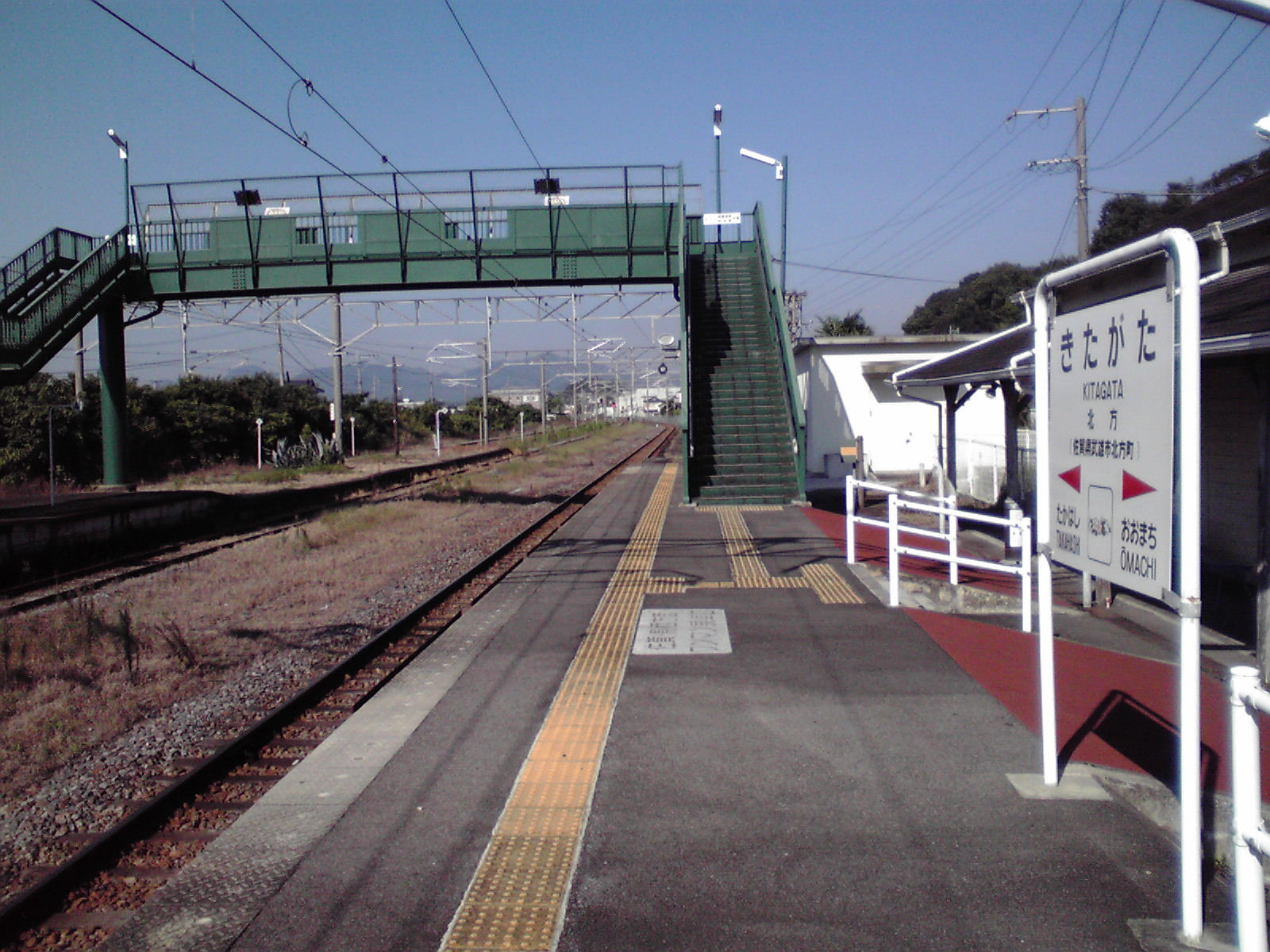
A view from platform 1 in the direction of Takahashi.

== History ==
The private Kyushu Railway had opened a track from Tosu to Saga on 20 August 1891. In the next phase of expansion, the track was extended westwards with Takeo (today Takeo-Onsen) opening as the new western terminus on 5 May 1895. Kitagata was opened on the same day as an intermediate station along the new stretch of track. When the Kyushu Railway was nationalized on 1 July 1907, Japanese Government Railways (JGR) took over control of the station. On 12 October 1909, the station became part of the Nagasaki Main Line. On 1 December 1934, another track was designated the Nagasaki Main Line and the track serving the station was redesignated the Sasebo Line. With the privatization of Japanese National Railways (JNR), the successor of JGR, on 1 April 1987, control of the station passed to JR Kyushu.

== Passenger statistics ==
In fiscal 2015, there were a total of 36,647 boarding passengers, giving a daily average of 100 passengers.

== Surrounding area ==
- Japan National Route 34
- Rokkaku River

== See also ==
- List of railway stations in Japan
