= List of cities in Saga Prefecture by population =

The following list sorts all cities (including towns) in the Japanese prefecture of Saga with a population of more than 5,000 according to the 2020 Census. As of October 1, 2020, 20 places fulfill this criterion and are listed here. This list refers only to the population of individual cities, towns and villages within their defined limits, which does not include other municipalities or suburban areas within urban agglomerations.

== List ==
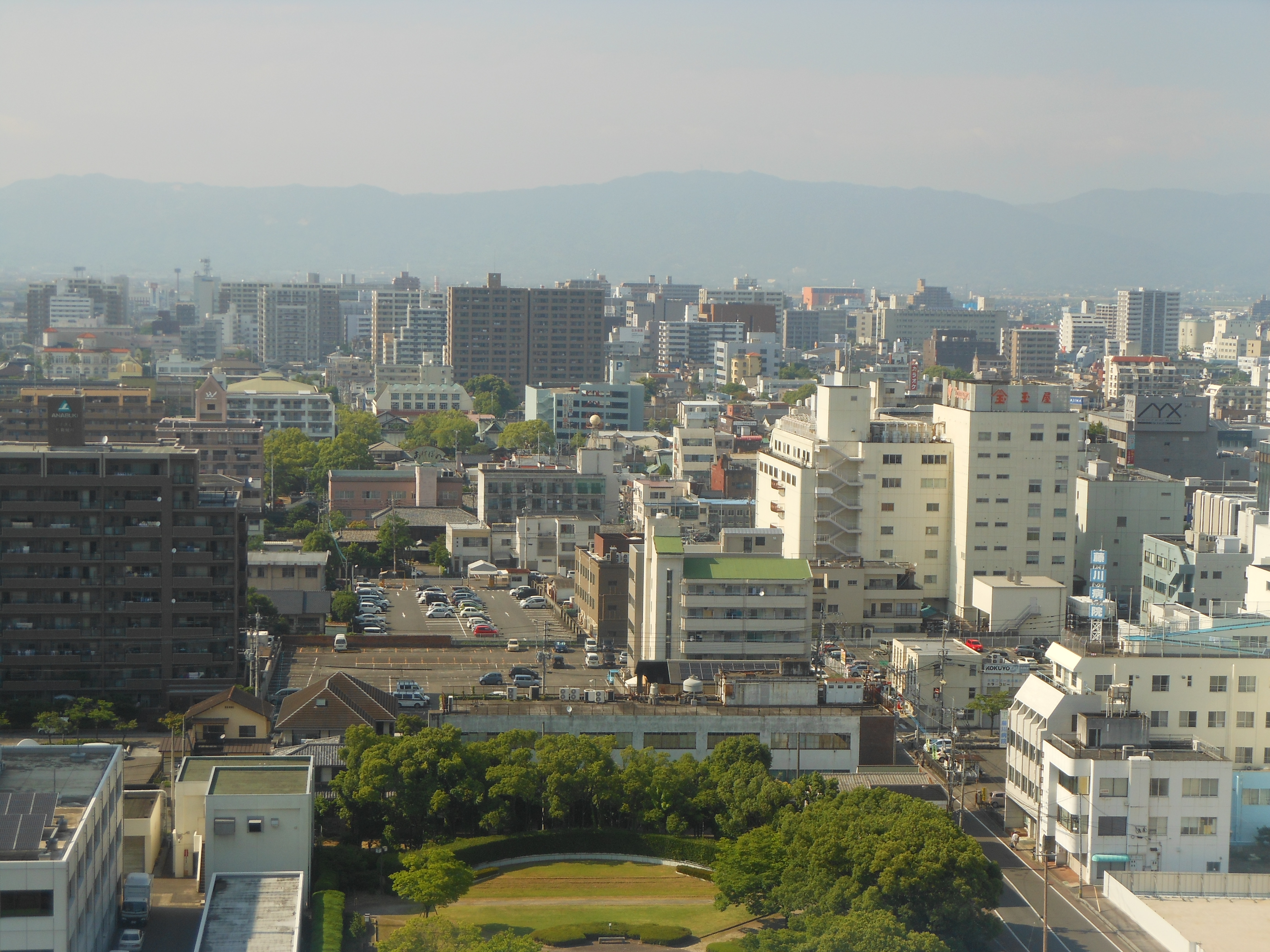
Saga

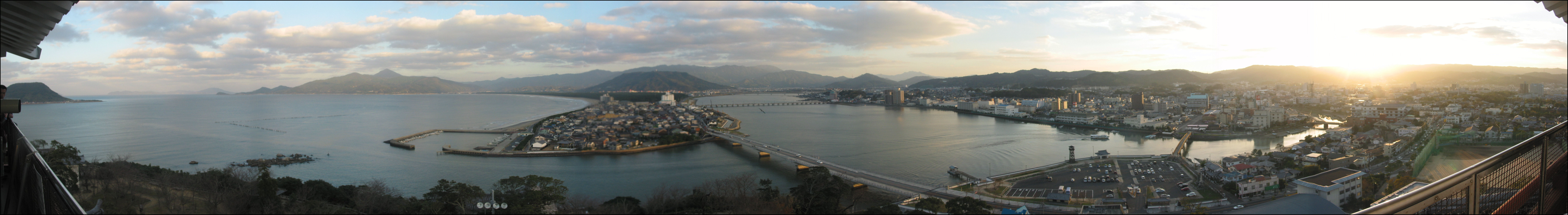
Karatsu

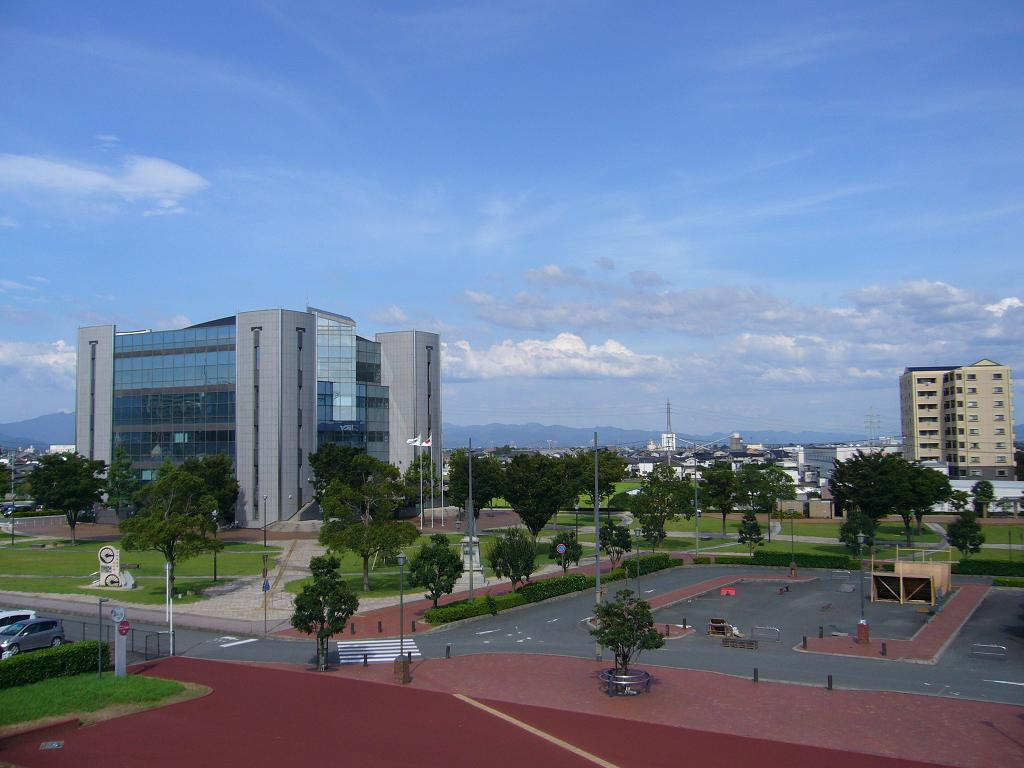
Tosu

The following table lists the 20 cities and towns in Saga with a population of at least 5,000 on October 1, 2020, according to the 2020 Census. The table also gives an overview of the evolution of the population since the 1995 census.

| Rank (2020) | Name | Status | 2020 | 2015 | 2010 | 2005 | 2000 | 1995 |
|---|---|---|---|---|---|---|---|---|
| 1 | Saga | City | 233,466 | 236,372 | 237,506 | 241,361 | 243,076 | 246,674 |
| 2 | Karatsu | City | 117,431 | 122,785 | 126,926 | 131,116 | 134,144 | 137,436 |
| 3 | Tosu | City | 74,258 | 72,902 | 69,074 | 64,723 | 60,726 | 57,414 |
| 4 | Imari | City | 52,651 | 55,238 | 57,161 | 58,190 | 59,143 | 60,348 |
| 5 | Takeo | City | 47,962 | 49,062 | 50,699 | 51,497 | 53,068 | 53,943 |
| 6 | Ogi | City | 43,976 | 44,259 | 45,133 | 45,852 | 45,375 | 43,491 |
| 7 | Kanzaki | City | 31,046 | 31,842 | 32,899 | 33,537 | 33,648 | 33,049 |
| 8 | Kashima | City | 27,915 | 29,684 | 30,720 | 32,117 | 33,215 | 34,083 |
| 9 | Ureshino | City | 25,867 | 27,336 | 28,984 | 30,392 | 31,324 | 32,389 |
| 10 | Miyaki | Town | 25,531 | 25,278 | 26,175 | 27,157 | 28,176 | 28,625 |
| 11 | Shiroishi | Town | 22,084 | 23,941 | 25,607 | 27,057 | 28,393 | 29,510 |
| 12 | Arita | Town | 19,028 | 20,148 | 20,929 | 21,570 | 22,314 | 22,818 |
| 13 | Taku | City | 18,304 | 19,749 | 21,404 | 22,739 | 23,949 | 24,507 |
| 14 | Kiyama | Town | 17,256 | 17,501 | 17,837 | 18,889 | 19,176 | 18,444 |
| 15 | Yoshinogari | Town | 16,330 | 16,411 | 16,405 | 16,100 | 16,042 | 15,631 |
| 16 | Kōhoku | Town | 9,573 | 9,583 | 9,515 | 9,628 | 9,584 | 9,539 |
| 17 | Kamimine | Town | 9,295 | 9,283 | 9,224 | 9,090 | 8,672 | 8,210 |
| 18 | Tara | Town | 8,126 | 8,779 | 9,842 | 10,660 | 11,140 | 11,681 |
| 19 | Ōmachi | Town | 6,305 | 6,777 | 7,369 | 7,956 | 8,503 | 8,787 |
| 20 | Genkai | Town | 5,609 | 5,902 | 6,379 | 6,738 | 6,986 | 7,737 |
