= Mikawachi Station =

Railway station in Sasebo, Nagasaki Prefecture, Japan

Mikawachi Station 三河内駅
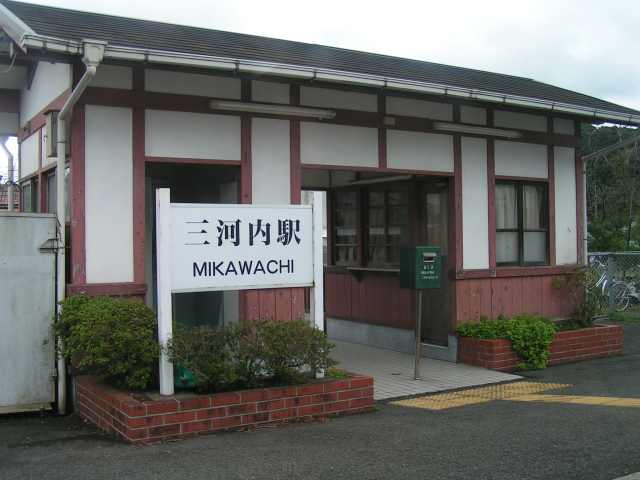
- Mikawachi Station in 2006

General information
- Location: 296 Mikawachihonmachi, Sasebo-shi, Nagasaki-ken 859-3151; Japan
- Coordinates: 33°09′01″N 129°49′45″E
- Operator: JR Kyushu
- Line: ■ Sasebo Line
- Distance: 35.7 km from Hizen-Yamaguchi
- Platforms: 2 side platforms
- Tracks: 2 + 1 siding

Construction
- Structure type: At grade
- Accessible: No – platforms linked by footbridge

Other information
- Status: Unstaffed
- Website: Official website

History
- Opened: 10 July 1897

Passengers
- FY2014: 83 daily

Services
Preceding station	JR Kyushu	Following station
Haiki towards Sasebo	Sasebo Line	Arita towards Kōhoku
Location
- Location within Nagasaki Prefecture Location within Japan

Mikawachi Station (三河内駅, Mikawachi-eki) is a passenger railway station located in the city of Sasebo, Nagasaki Prefecture, Japan. It is operated by JR Kyushu.

== Lines ==
The station is served by the Sasebo Line and is located 35.7 km from the starting point of the line at Hizen-Yamaguchi. Only Sasebo Line local services stop at this station.

== Station layout ==
The station, which is unstaffed, consists of two side platforms serving two tracks with a siding branching off track 2. The station building is a small wooden structure which houses a ticket window but which is presently unstaffed. Access to the opposite side platform is by means of a footbridge.

=== Platforms ===
1	■ Sasebo Line	for Isahaya
2	■ Sasebo Line	for Sasebo

== History ==
The private Kyushu Railway had opened a track from Tosu to Saga and Takeo (today Takeo-Onsen) by 5 May 1895. In the next phase of expansion, the track was extended further west with Haiki opening as the new western terminus on 10 July 1897. Mikawachi was opened on the same day as an intermediate station on the new track. When the Kyushu Railway was nationalized on 1 July 1907, Japanese Government Railways (JGR) took over control of the station. On 12 October 1909, station became part of the Nagasaki Main Line. On 1 December 1934, another route was given the designation Nagasaki Main Line and track serving the station was redesignated the Sasebo Line. With the privatization of Japanese National Railways (JNR), the successor of JGR, on 1 April 1987, control of the station passed to JR Kyushu.

== Passenger statistics ==
In fiscal 2014, there were a total of 30,338 boarding passengers, giving a daily average of 83 passengers.

== Surrounding area ==
- Japan National Route 35
- Mikawachi Hospital
- Mikawachi Post Office
- Sasebo City Office Mikawachi Branch

== See also ==
- List of railway stations in Japan
