= Daitō Station =

Railway station in Sasebo, Nagasaki Prefecture, Japan

Daitō Station 大塔駅
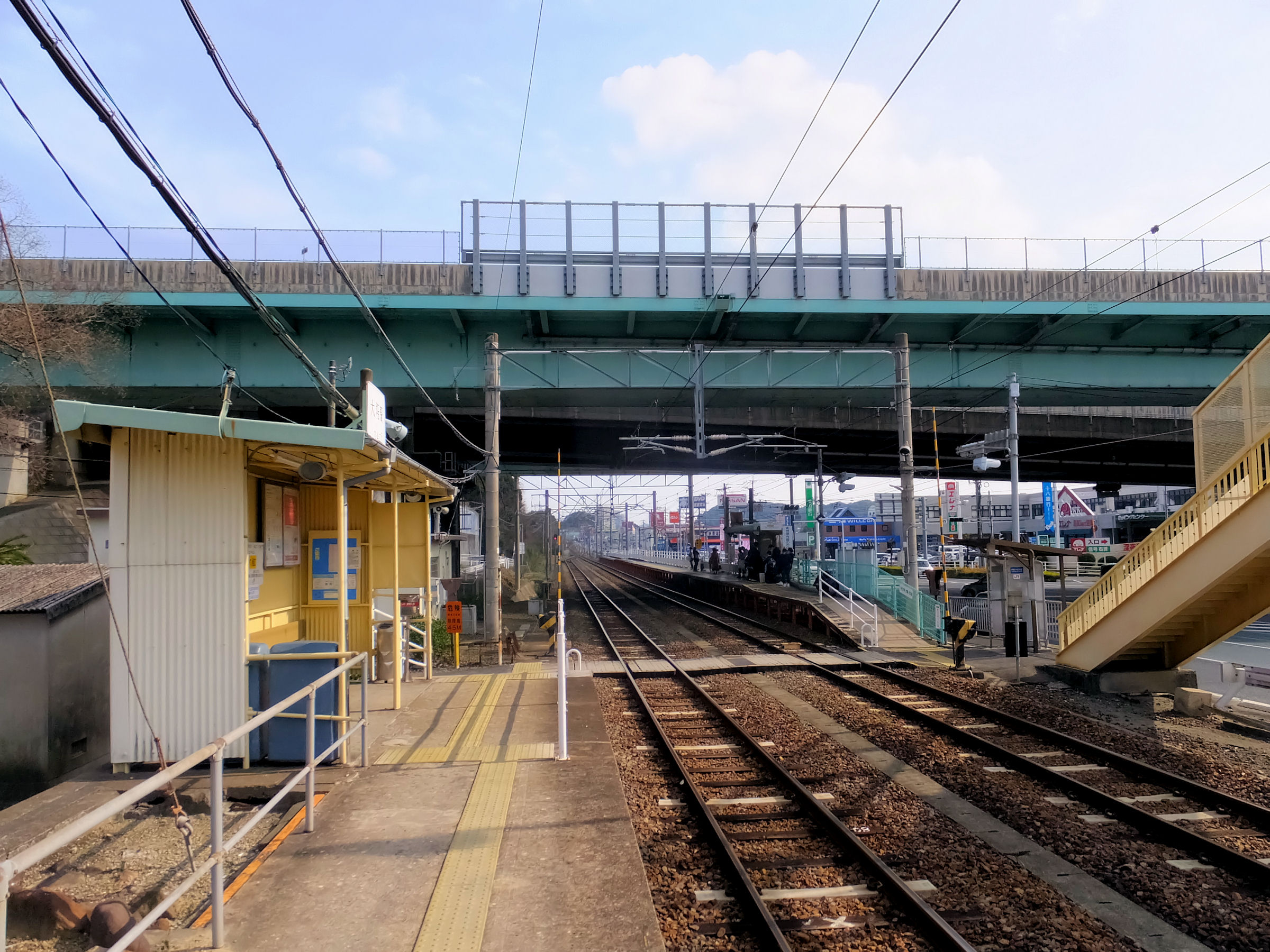
- Daitō Station in 2014

General information
- Location: 16-2 Daitō-cho, Sasebo-shi, Nagasaki-ken 857-1161; Japan
- Coordinates: 33°08′58″N 129°46′55″E
- Operator: JR Kyushu
- Line: ■ Sasebo Line
- Distance: 42.6 km from Hizen-Yamaguchi
- Platforms: 2 side platforms
- Tracks: 2

Construction
- Structure type: At grade
- Accessible: Yes: platforms linked by level crossing and ramps

Other information
- Status: Unstaffed
- Website: Official website

History
- Opened: 30 September 1942

Passengers
- FY2016: 413 daily
- Rank: 238th (among JR Kyushu stations)

Services
Preceding station	JR Kyushu	Following station
Hiu towards Sasebo	Sasebo Line	Haiki towards Kōhoku
Location
- Location within Nagasaki Prefecture Location within Japan

Daitō Station (大塔駅, Daitō-eki) is a passenger railway station located in the city of Sasebo, Nagasaki Prefecture, Japan. It is operated by JR Kyushu.

== Lines ==
The station is served by the Sasebo Line and is located 42.6 km from the starting point of the line at Hizen-Yamaguchi. Besides the Sasebo Line local services, the JR Kyushu Rapid Seaside Liner also stops at the station. In addition, although Haiki is the official starting point of the Ōmura Line, most of its local services continue on to terminate at Sasebo using the Sasebo Line tracks and stop at this station on the way.

== Station layout ==
The station, which is unstaffed, consists of two staggered side platforms serving two tracks. There is no station building but shelters are provided on both platforms as well as automatic ticket vending machines. Access to the opposite side platform is by means of a level crossing with ramps at both ends.

=== Platforms ===
1	■ Sasebo Line	for Isahaya
2	■ Sasebo Line	for Sasebo

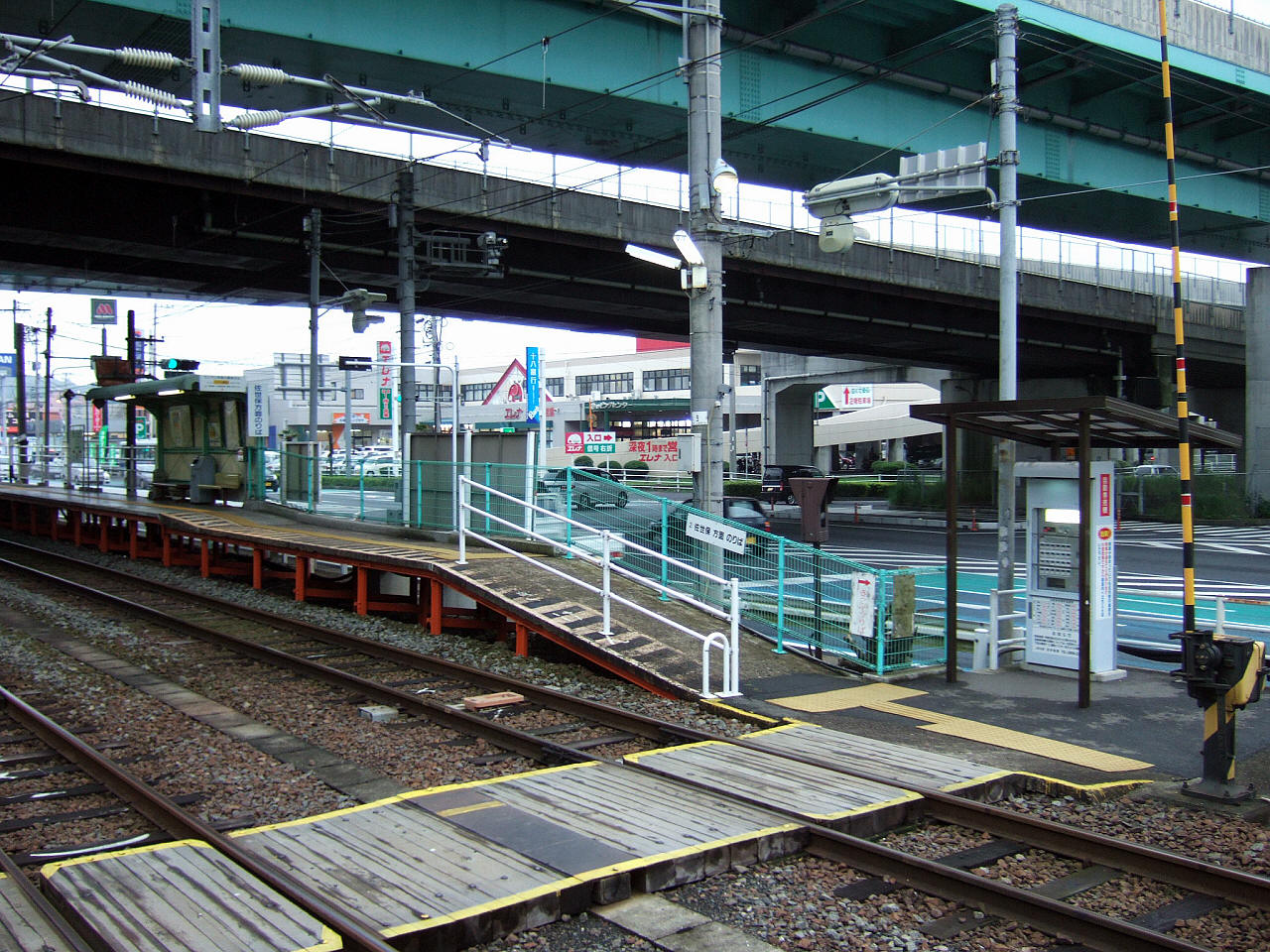
Close up of the level crossing and ramp leading to a platform.

== History ==
Japanese Government Railways (JGR) opened the station on 30 September 1942 as Daitō Signal Box. On 15 May 1945, the facility was upgraded to a full station and passenger services commenced. With the privatization of Japanese National Railways (JNR), the successor of JGR, on 1 April 1987, control of the station passed to JR Kyushu.

== Passenger statistics ==
In fiscal 2020, the station was used by an average of 413 passengers daily (boarding passengers only), and it ranked 238th among the busiest stations of JR Kyushu.

== Environs ==
- Nishi–Kyushu Expressway Sasebo–Daitō Interchange
- Japan National Route 35
- Japan National Route 205
- ÆON Daitō Shopping Center

== See also ==
- List of railway stations in Japan
