= Takahashi Station =

Railway station in Takeo, Saga Prefecture, Japan

Takahashi Station 高橋駅
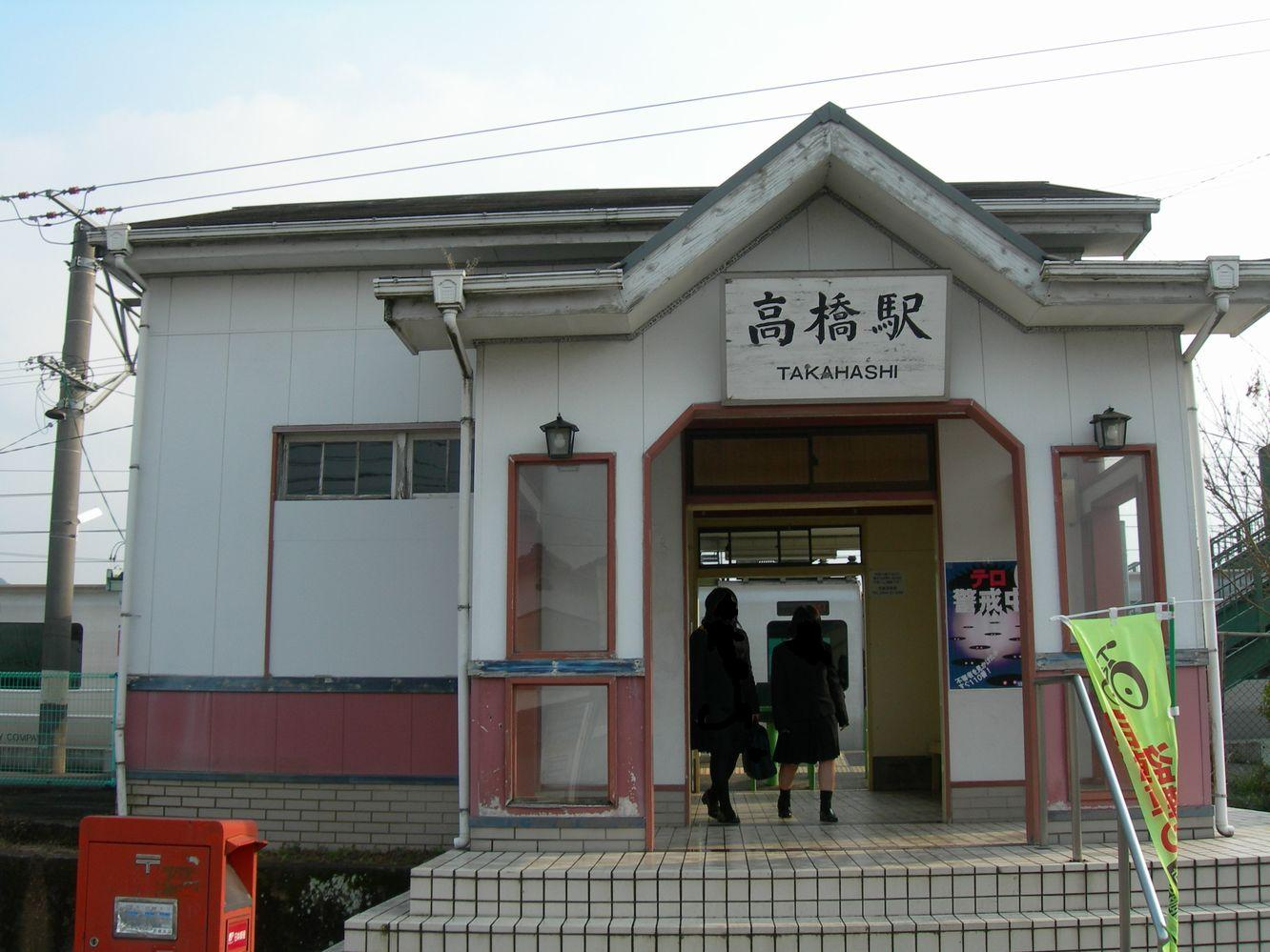
- Takahashi Station in 2008

General information
- Location: Asahicho Oaza Amagu, Takeo-shi, Saga-ken 843-0001; Japan
- Coordinates: 33°12′28″N 130°02′33″E
- Operator: JR Kyushu
- Line: ■ Sasebo Line
- Distance: 11.4 km from Hizen-Yamaguchi
- Platforms: 2 side platforms
- Tracks: 2 + 1 siding

Construction
- Structure type: At grade
- Accessible: No – platforms linked by footbridge

Other information
- Status: Unstaffed
- Website: Official website

History
- Opened: 21 August 1923

Passengers
- FY2015: 136 daily

Services
Preceding station	JR Kyushu	Following station
Takeo-Onsen towards Sasebo	Sasebo Line	Kitagata towards Kōhoku
Location
- Location within Saga Prefecture Location within Japan

Takahashi Station (高橋駅, Takahashi-eki) is a passenger railway station located in the Asahi neighborhood of the city of Takeo, Saga Prefecture, Japan. It is operated by JR Kyushu.

== Lines ==
The station is served by the Sasebo Line and is located 11.4 km from the starting point of the line at Hizen-Yamaguchi. Only Sasebo Line local services stop at this station.

== Station layout ==
The station, which is unstaffed, consists of two side platforms serving two tracks, with a siding branching off one of the tracks. The station building is a timber structure in Dutch style which is presently unstaffed and serves only as a waiting room. Access to the opposite side platform is by means of a footbridge.

== History ==
Japanese Government Railways (JGR) opened the station on 21 August 1923 as an additional station on the existing track of what was then the Nagasaki Main Line. On 1 December 1934, another route was designated the Nagasaki Main Line. The track serving the station was redesignated the Sasebo Line. With the privatization of Japanese National Railways (JNR), the successor of JGR, on 1 April 1987, control of the station passed to JR Kyushu.

== Passenger statistics ==
In fiscal 2015, there were a total of 49,689 boarding passengers, giving a daily average of 136 passengers.

== Surrounding area ==
- Japan National Route 34
- Japan National Route 498
- Nagasaki Expressway Takeo-Kitagata InterChange
- Takahashi Post Office

== See also ==
- List of railway stations in Japan
