= Kami-Arita Station =

Railway station in Arita, Saga Prefecture, Japan

Kami-Arita Station 上有田駅
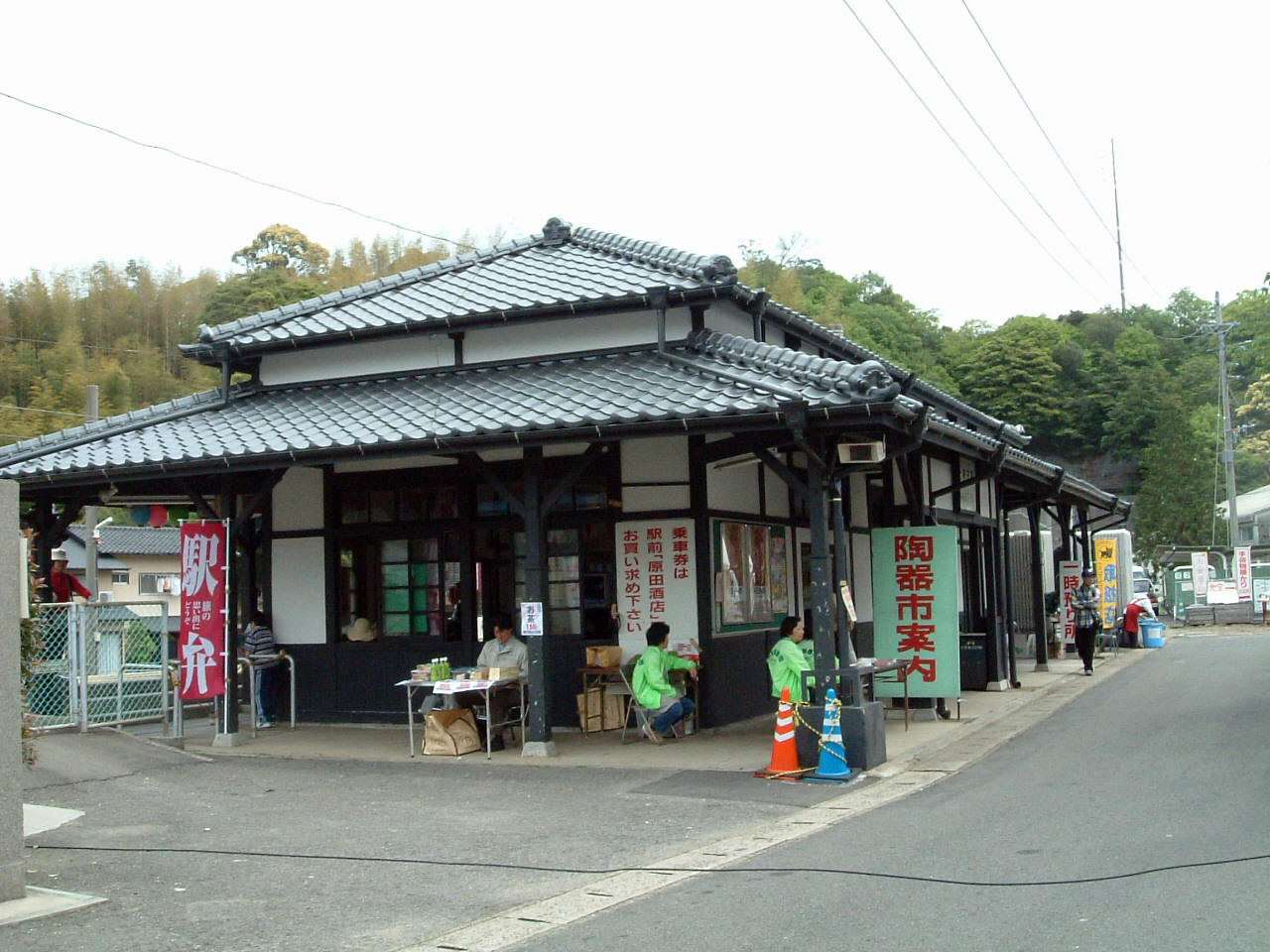

General information
- Location: 1-chōme-13 Nakadaru, Arita-cho, Nishimatsuura-gun, Saga-ken 844-0002; Japan
- Coordinates: 33°11′25″N 129°54′21″E
- Operator: JR Kyushu
- Line: ■ Sasebo Line
- Distance: 25.7 km from Hizen-Yamaguchi
- Platforms: 2 side platforms
- Tracks: 2

Construction
- Structure type: At grade
- Accessible: No – platforms linked by footbridge

Other information
- Status: Unstaffed
- Website: Official website

History
- Opened: 1 October 1898
- Former names: Nakataru (until 1 May 1909)

Passengers
- FY2015: 108 daily

Services
Preceding station	JR Kyushu	Following station
Arita towards Sasebo	Sasebo Line	Mimasaka towards Kōhoku
Location
- Location within Saga Prefecture Location within Japan

Kami-Arita Station (上有田駅, Kami-Arita-eki) is a passenger railway station located in the town of Arita, Saga Prefecture, Japan. It is operated by JR Kyushu.

== Lines ==
The station is served by the Sasebo Line and is located 25.7 km from the starting point of the line at Hizen-Yamaguchi. Only Sasebo Line local services stop at this station.

== Station layout ==
The station, which is unstaffed, consists of two staggered side platforms serving two tracks with a siding branching off track 2 and running on the other side of platform 2. The station building is an original Meiji-era timber structure built in 1909 when the station opened for passenger traffic. Access to the opposite side platform is by means of a footbridge.

The station is normally unstaffed but some types of tickets are available from a kan'i itaku agent outside the station. In addition, during the "Arita Pottery City", a major ceramic pottery fair held in the town of Arita during Golden Week, a ticket window with a POS machine would be set up.

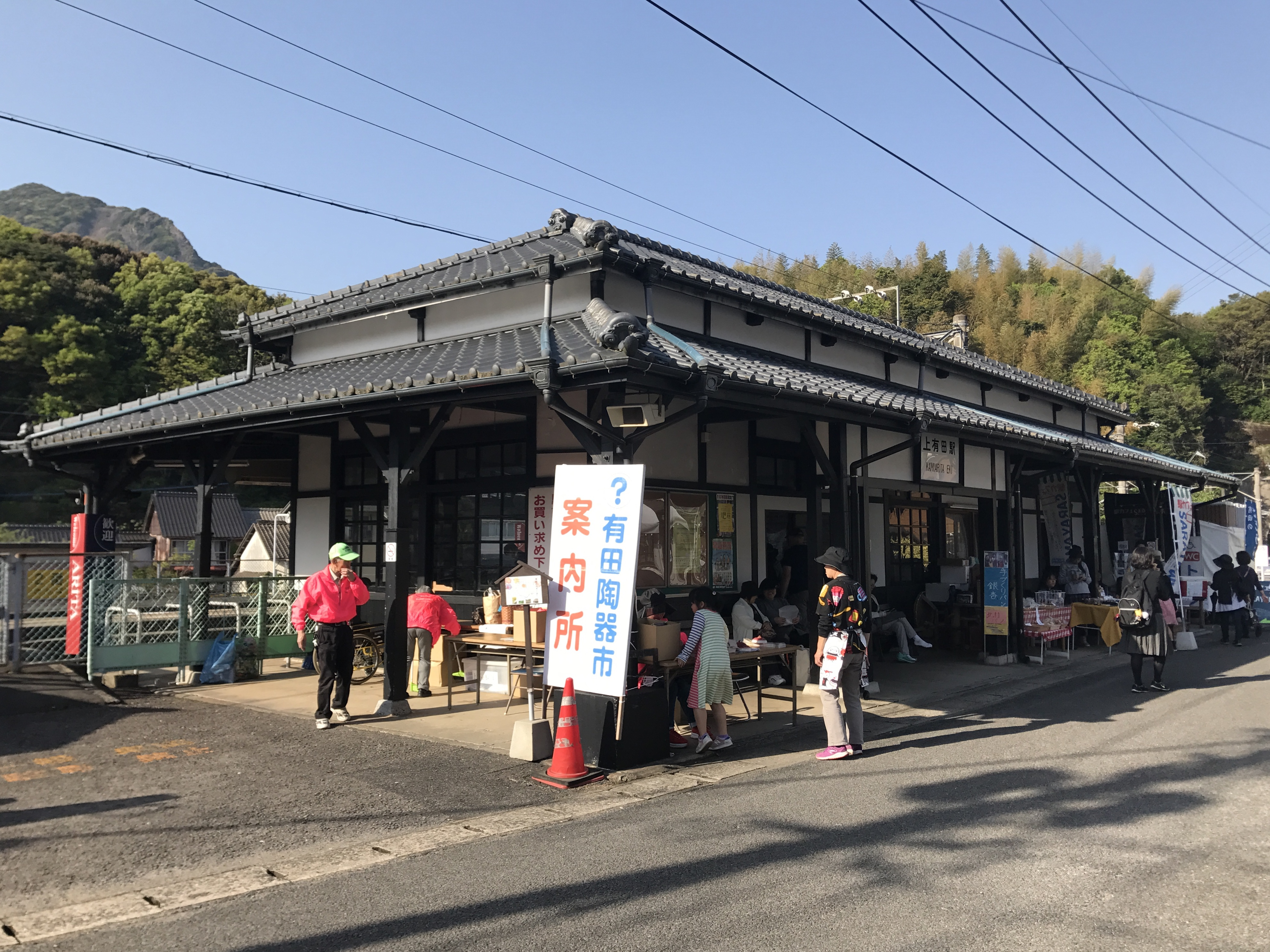
Arita Station during Golden Week 2017. The sign says "Arita Pottery City information centre".

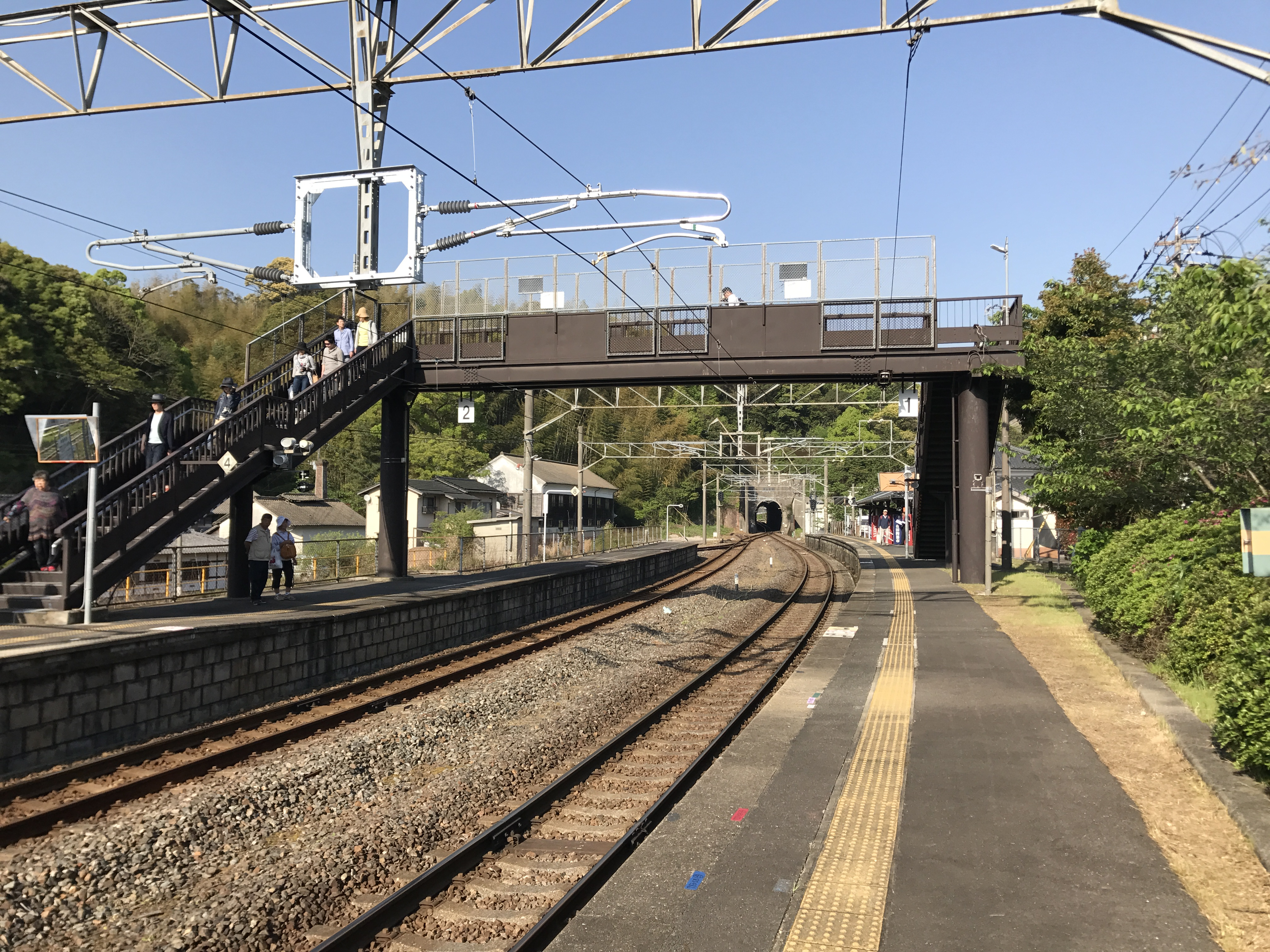
A view of the platforms and tracks. The siding can be seen to the far left.

== History ==
The private Kyushu Railway, in building a line to Nagasaki, had opened a track from Tosu to Saga and Takeo (today Takeo-Onsen) by 5 May 1895 and had expanded to Haiki by 10 July 1897. On 1 October 1989. the station was opened as an intermediate station on the existing track between Takeo-Onsen and Haiki. At the time it was named Nakataru (中樽) and was for freight only. When the Kyushu Railway was nationalized on 1 July 1907, Japanese Government Railways (JGR) took over control of the station. On 1 May 1909, passenger services commenced and the station was renamed Kami-Arita. On 12 October 1909, track from Tosu through Kami-Arita and Haiki to Nagasaki was designated the Nagasaki Main Line. On 1 December 1934, another route was given the designation Nagasaki Main Line and the official starting point of the Sasebo Line was moved to Hizen-Yamaguchi. As such, Kami-Arita became part of the Sasebo Line. With the privatization of Japanese National Railways (JNR), the successor of JGR, on 1 April 1987, control of the station passed to JR Kyushu.

== Passenger statistics ==
In fiscal 2015, there were a total of 39,518 boarding passengers, giving a daily average of 108 passengers.

== Environs ==
- Japan National Route 35
- Arita Ceramic Art Museum

== See also ==
- List of railway stations in Japan
