= Hiu Station =

Railway station in Sasebo, Nagasaki Prefecture, Japan

Hiu Station 日宇駅
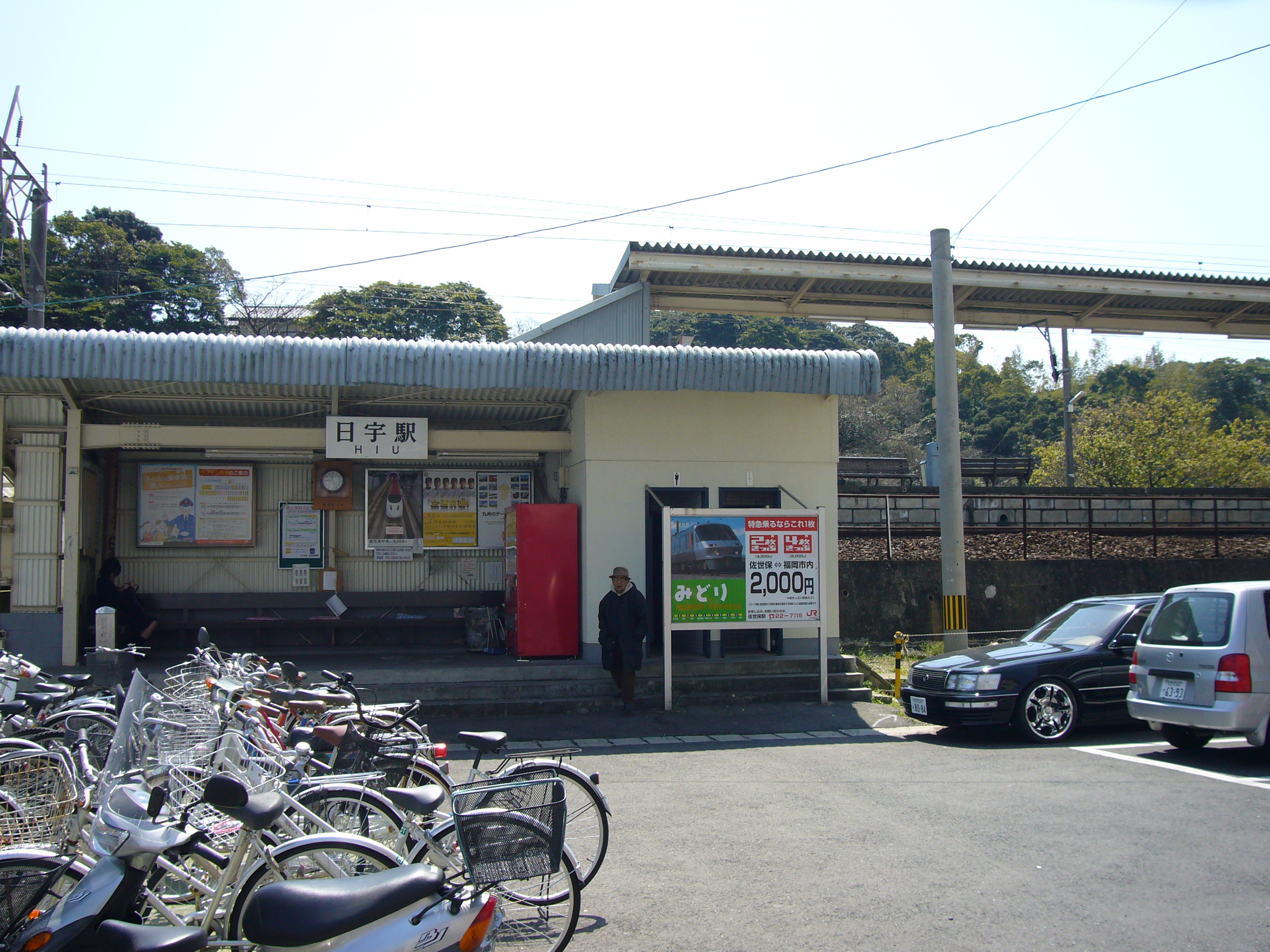
- Hiu Station in April 2008

General information
- Location: 682-7 Hiucho, Sasebo-shi, Nagasaki-ken 857-1151; Japan
- Coordinates: 33°09′27″N 129°45′29″E
- Operator: JR Kyushu
- Line: ■ Sasebo Line
- Distance: 45.5 km from Hizen-Yamaguchi
- Platforms: 1 island platform
- Tracks: 2 + 1 siding

Construction
- Structure type: At grade
- Cycle facilities: Designated parking area for bikes

Other information
- Status: Unstaffed
- Website: Official website

History
- Opened: 26 December 1910

Passengers
- FY2020: 421 daily
- Rank: 232nd (among JR Kyushu stations)

Services
Preceding station	JR Kyushu	Following station
Sasebo Terminus	Sasebo Line	Daitō towards Kōhoku
Sasebo towards Isahaya	Ōmura Line Local	Daitō towards Haiki
Sasebo towards Isahaya	Ōmura Line Seaside Liner	Daitō towards Haiki
Location
- Location within Nagasaki Prefecture Location within Japan

Hiu Station (日宇駅, Hiu-eki) is a passenger railway station located in the city of Sasebo, Nagasaki Prefecture, Japan. It is operated by JR Kyushu.

== Lines ==
The station is served by the Sasebo Line and is located 45.5 km from the starting point of the line at Hizen-Yamaguchi. Besides the Sasebo Line local services, the JR Kyushu Rapid Seaside Liner also stops at the station. In addition, although Haiki is the official starting point of the Ōmura Line, most of its local services continue on to terminate at Sasebo using the Sasebo Line tracks.

== Station layout ==
The station, which is unstaffed, consists of an island platform serving two tracks with a siding. A simple shelter is provided at the station as a waiting room. Another shelter is provided on the platform, together with an automatic ticket vending machine.

=== Platforms ===
1	■ Sasebo Line	for Isahaya
2	■ Sasebo Line	for Sasebo

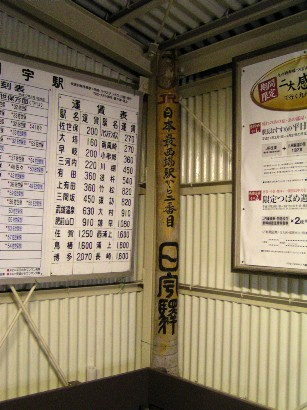
A bamboo plaque which asserts that the station is the 2nd westernmost railway station in Japan.

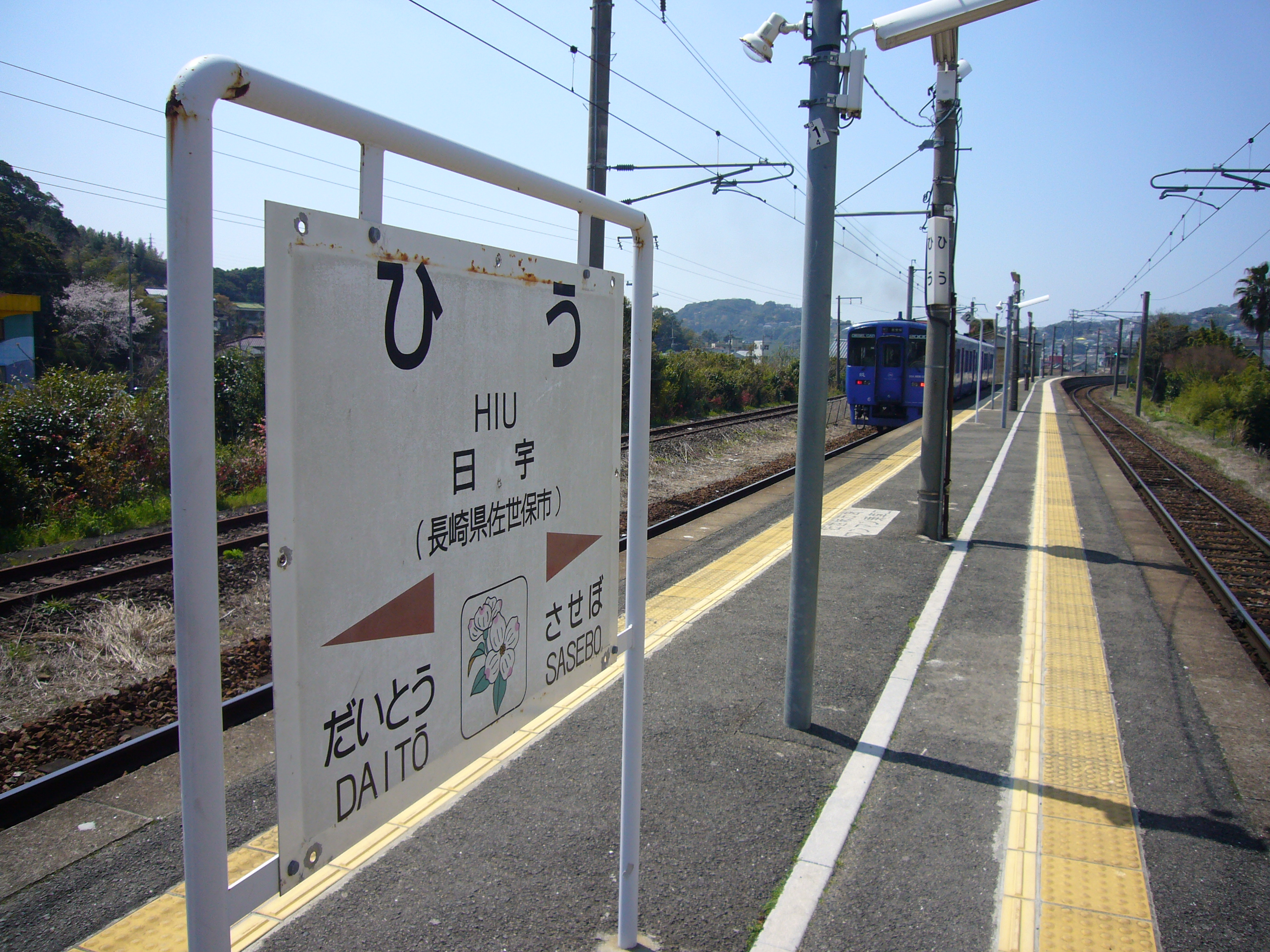
A view of the platform and tracks. The siding can be seen to the far left.

== History ==
Japanese Government Railways (JGR) opened the station on 26 December 1910 as an additional station on the existing track of the Sasebo Line. With the privatization of Japanese National Railways (JNR), the successor of JGR, on 1 April 1987, control of the station passed to JR Kyushu.

== Passenger statistics ==
In fiscal 2020, the station was used by an average of 421 passengers daily (boarding passengers only), and it ranked 232rd among the busiest stations of JR Kyushu.

== Environs ==
- National Route 35
- Hiu Post Office
- Sasebo City Office Hiu Branch
- Sasebo-Minami High School
- Sasebo National College of Technology

== See also ==
- List of railway stations in Japan
