= Ōmachi Station (Saga) =

Railway station in Ōmachi, Saga Prefecture, Japan

Ōmachi Station 大町駅
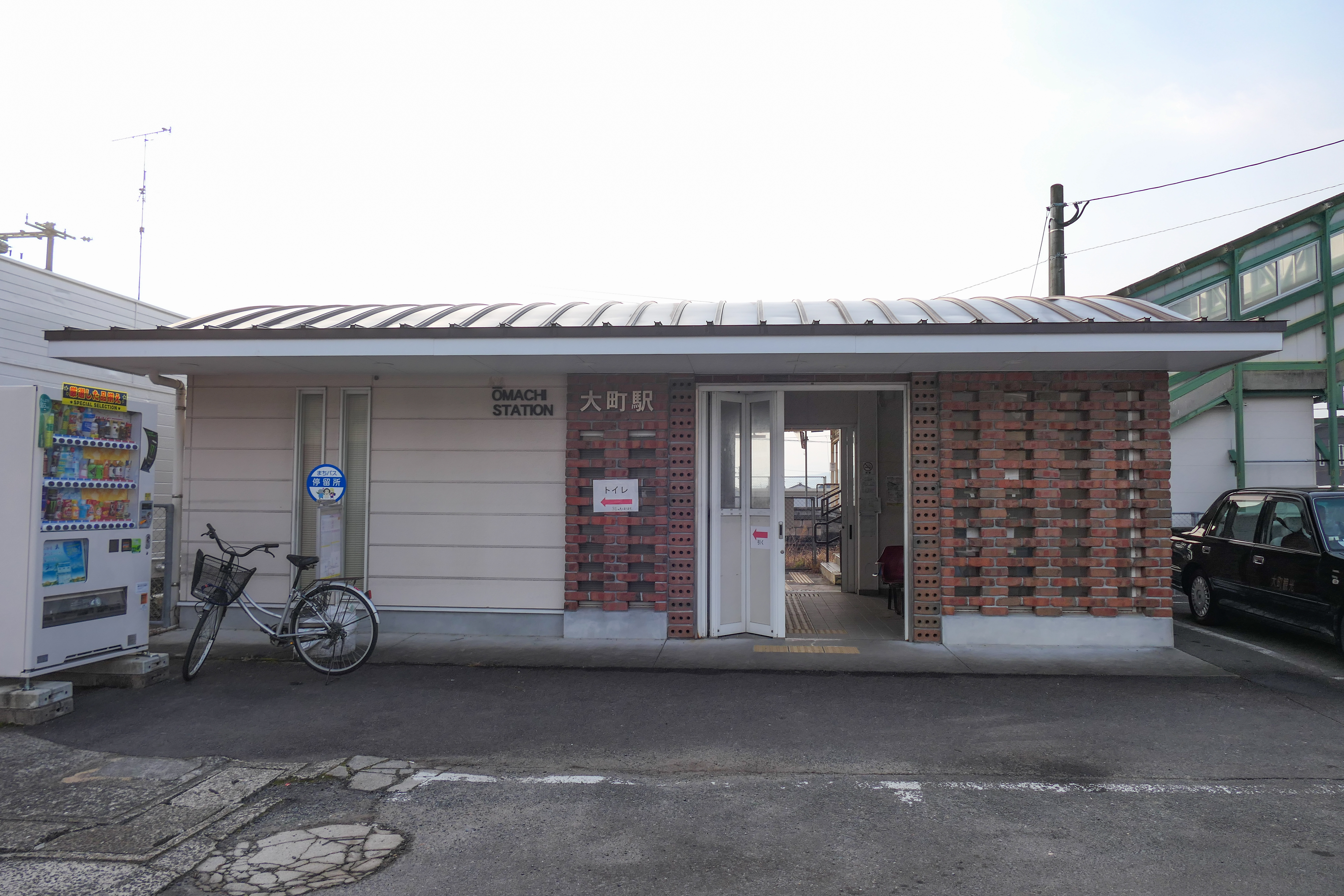
- Ōmachi Station in January 2023

General information
- Location: Fukumo, Ōmachi-cho, Kishima-gun, Saga-ken 849-2102; Japan
- Coordinates: 33°12′45″N 130°06′23″E
- Operator: JR Kyushu
- Line: ■ Sasebo Line
- Distance: 5.1 km from Hizen-Yamaguchi
- Platforms: 1 island platform
- Tracks: 2 + 1 siding

Construction
- Structure type: At grade
- Accessible: No – platforms accessed by footbridge

Other information
- Status: Unstaffed
- Website: Official website

History
- Opened: 11 December 1919

Passengers
- FY2015: 250 daily

Services
Preceding station	JR Kyushu	Following station
Kitagata towards Sasebo	Sasebo Line	Kōhoku Terminus
Location
- Location within Saga Prefecture Location within Japan

Ōmachi Station (大町駅, Ōmachi-eki) is a passenger railway station located in the town of Ōmachi, Kishima District, Saga Prefecture, Japan. It is operated by JR Kyushu.

== Lines ==
The station is served by the Sasebo Line and is located 5.1 km from the starting point of the line at Hizen-Yamaguchi. Only Sasebo Line local services stop at this station.

== Station layout ==
The station, which is unstaffed, consists of an island platform serving two tracks with a siding branching off track 1. The station building is a small brick structure. The ticket window which it houses has become unstaffed and the building presently serves only as a waiting room. Access to the island platform is by means of a footbridge.

=== Platforms ===
1	■ Sasebo Line	for Takeo-Onsen, Arita and Kitagata
2	■ Sasebo Line	for Saga and Tosu

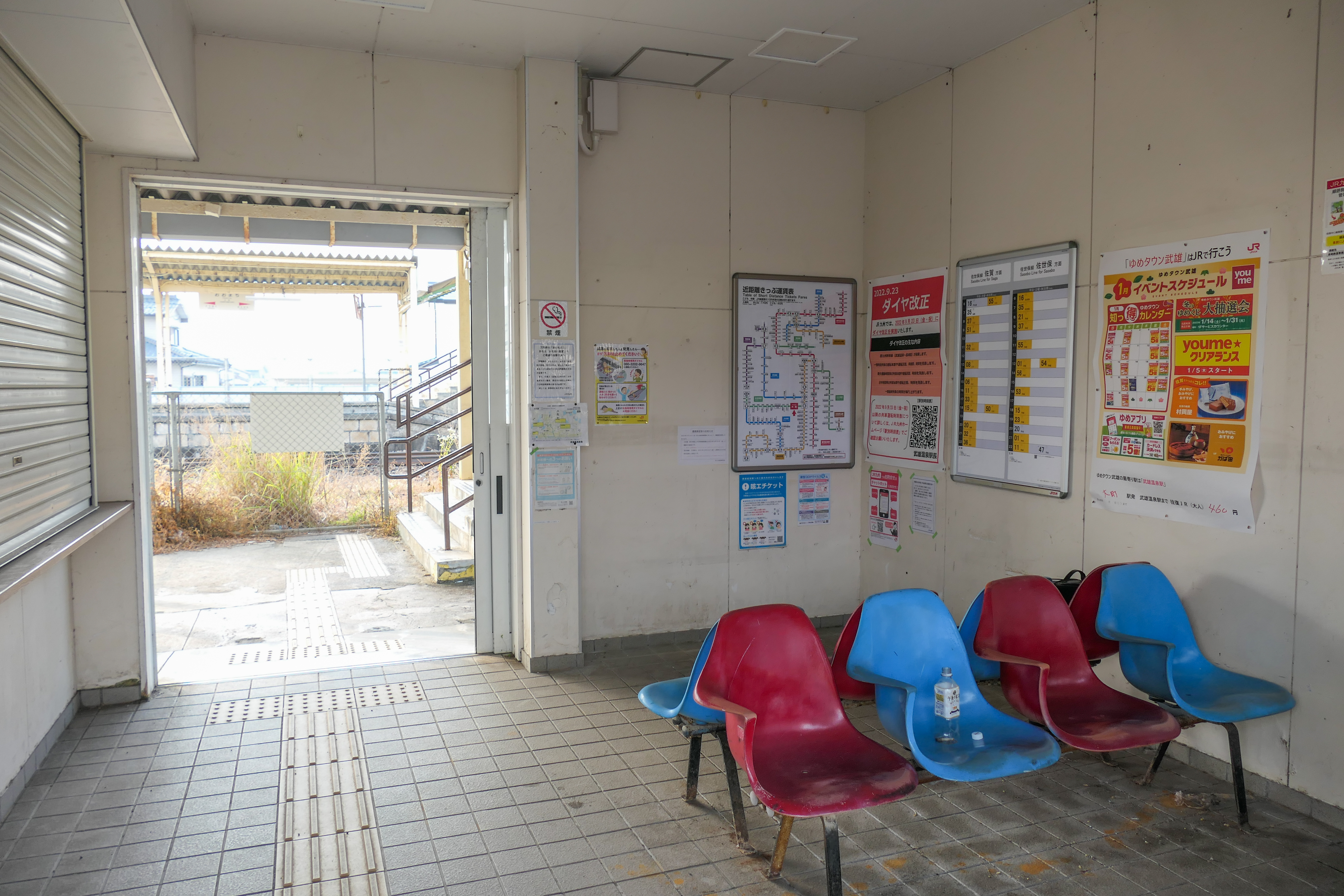
Interior

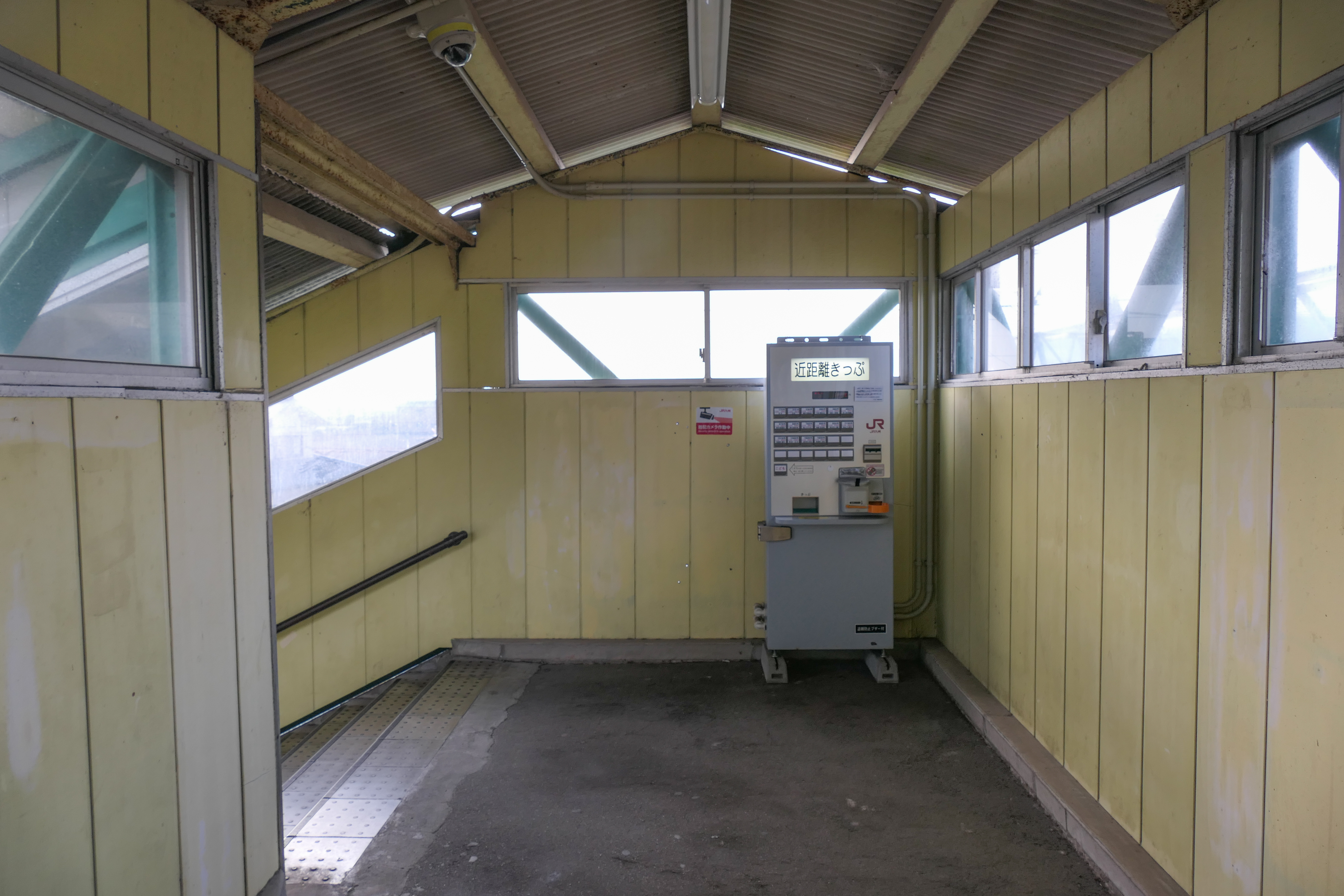
Inside the footbridge

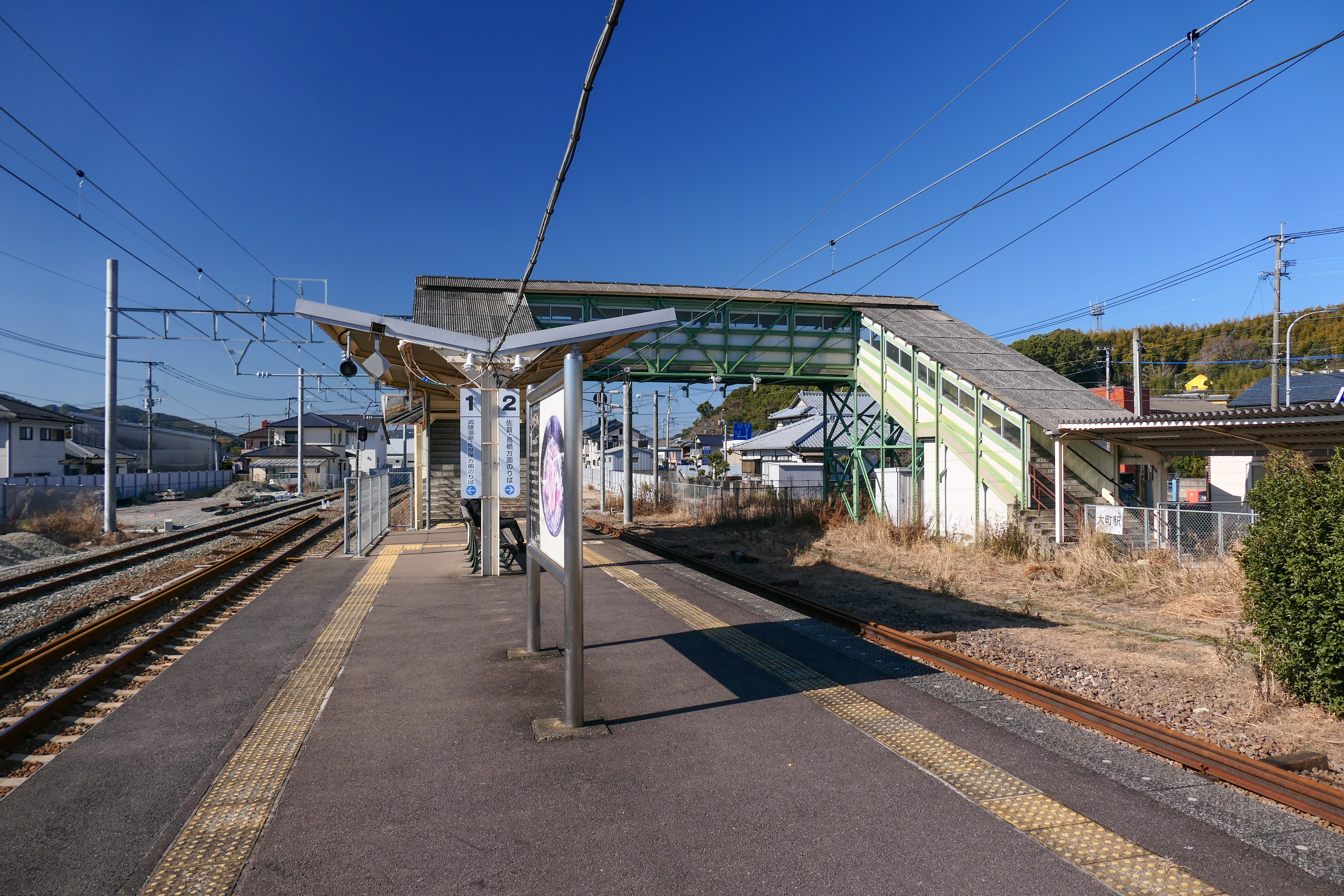
Platform

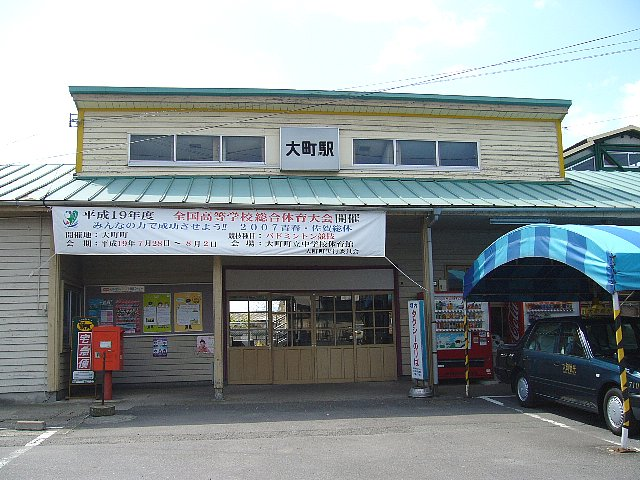
former station building（March 2006）

== History ==
Japanese Government Railways (JGR) opened the station on 11 December 1919 as Ōmachi Signal Box on the existing track of what was then the Nagasaki Main Line. On 1 September 1928, the facility was upgraded to a full station and passenger services commenced. On 1 December 1934, station became part of the Sasebo Line. With the privatization of Japanese National Railways (JNR), the successor of JGR, on 1 April 1987, control of the station passed to JR Kyushu.

== Passenger statistics ==
In fiscal 2015, there were a total of 91,291 boarding passengers, giving a daily average of 250 passengers.

== Environs ==
- Saga Sanyo Industries
- Ōmachi City Hall
- Ōmachi Post Office
- Ōmachi Higashi Post Office
- Ōmachi Hospital
- Ōmachi Police Station
- Ōmachi Elementary School
- Ōmachi Junior High School

== See also ==
- List of railway stations in Japan
