= Ōmachi, Saga =

Ōmachi 大町町
- Town
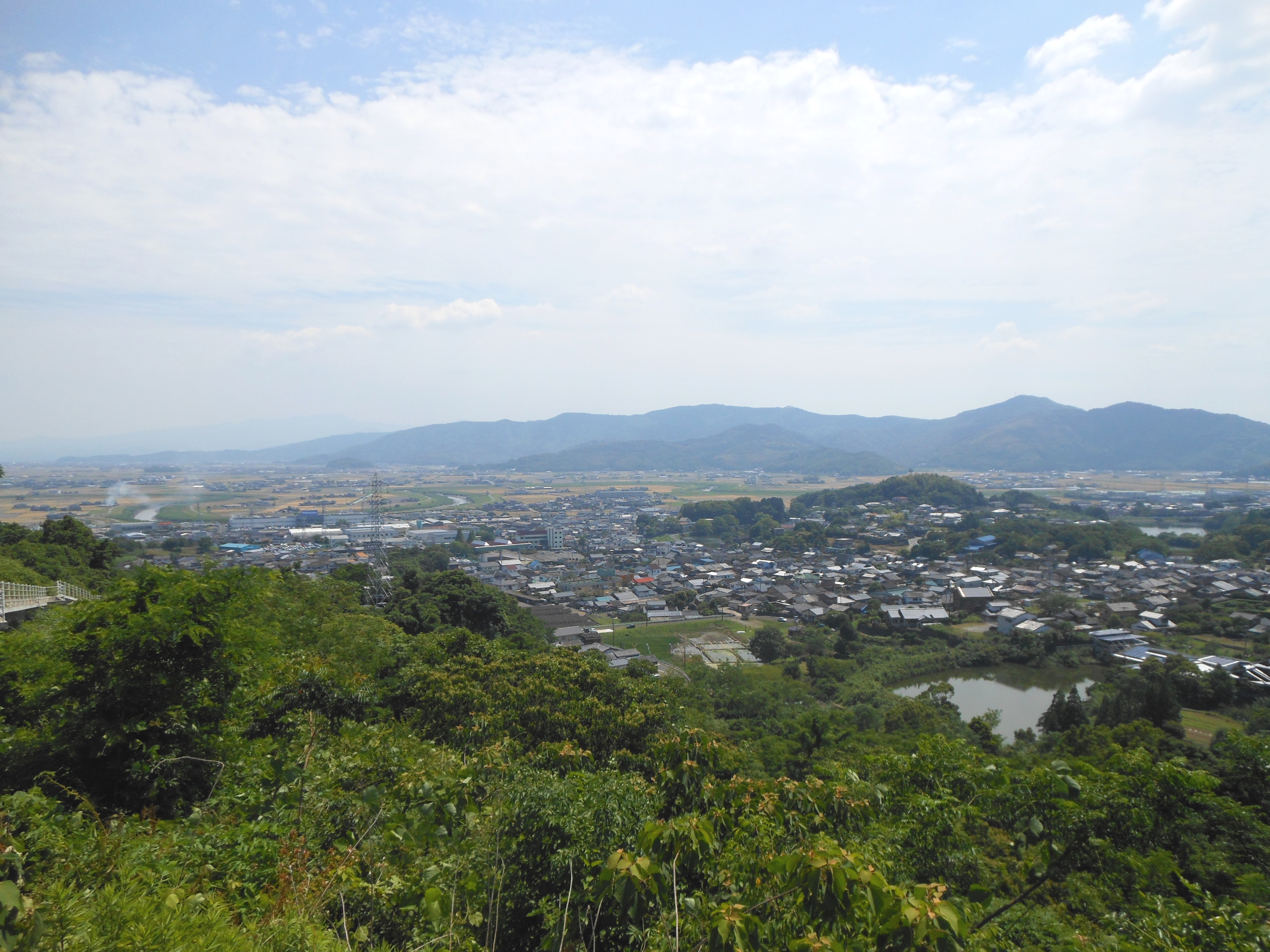
- View of Omachi and Rokkaku river

- Flag Seal
- Location of Ōmachi in Saga Prefecture

- Location in Japan
- Coordinates: 33°12′50″N 130°6′58″E
- Country: Japan
- Region: Kyushu
- Prefecture: Saga
- District: Kishima

Government
  - Mayor: Hiroshisei Takemura

Area
  - Total: 11.50 km^{2} (4.44 sq mi)

Population (May 31, 2023)
  - Total: 5,960
  - Density: 518/km^{2} (1,340/sq mi)
- Time zone: UTC+09:00 (JST)
- City hall address: 5017 Ōmachi, Ōmachi-chō, Kishima-gun, Saga-ken 849-2101
- Website: Official website
- Symbols
- Flower: Pansy
- Tree: Sweet Osmanthus

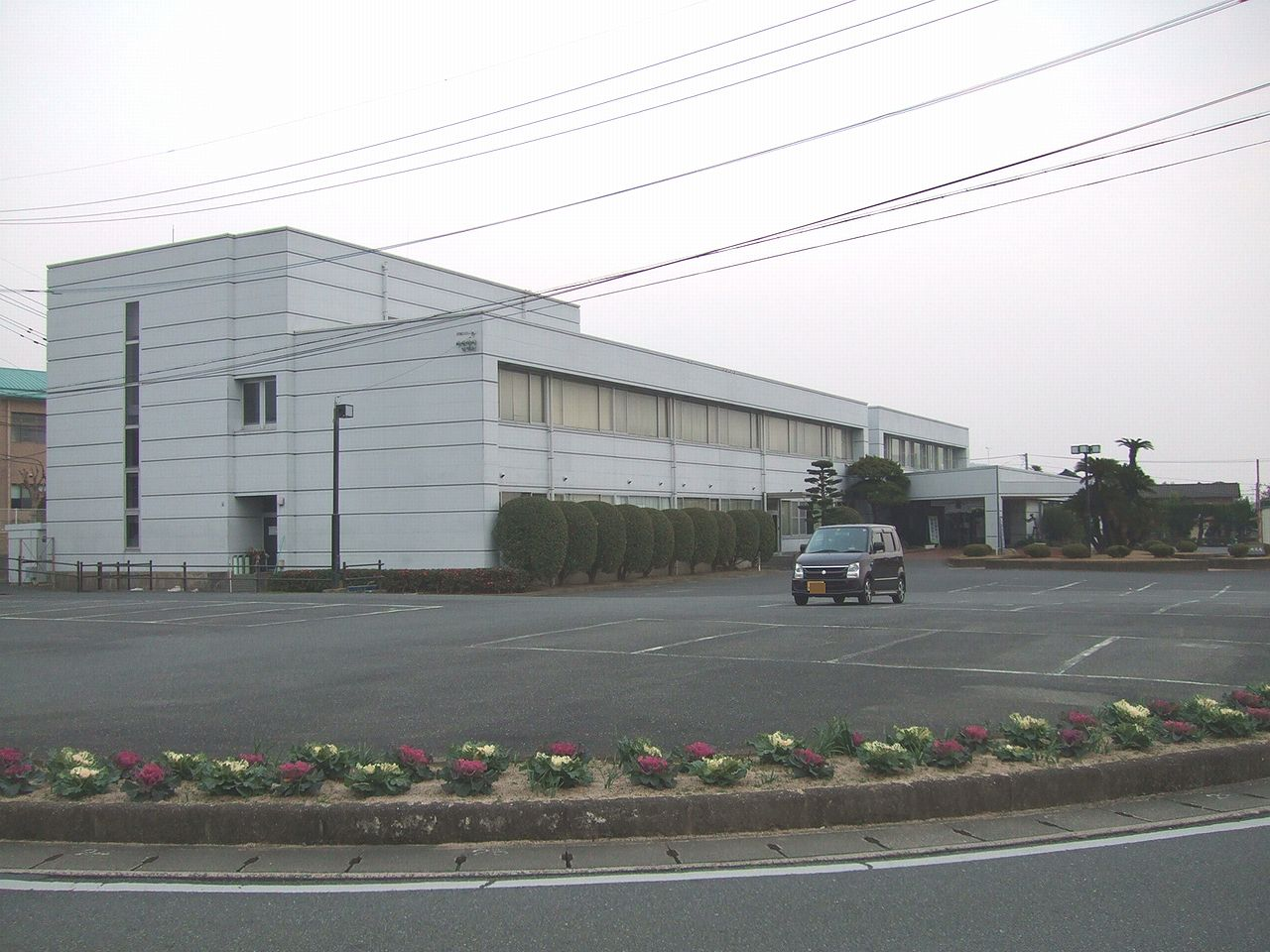
Ōmachi town hall

Ōmachi (大町町, Ōmachi-chō) is a town located in Kishima District, Saga Prefecture, Japan. As of 31 May 2024, the town had an estimated population of 5,960 in 2646 households, and a population density of 520 persons per km^{2}. The total area of the town is 11.50 km^{2} (4.44 sq mi).

== Geography ==
Ōmachi is located about 20 kilometers inland west of Saga City. Its total area is the smallest in Saga Prefecture.

- Mountains: The northern part of town gradually becomes mountainous.
- Rivers: Rokkaku River
- Lakes: The northern, mountainous part of town is dotted with ponds.

=== Adjoining municipalities ===
Saga Prefecture

- Kōhoku
- Shiroishi
- Takeo
- Taku

=== Climate ===
Ōmachi has a humid subtropical climate (Köppen Cfa) characterized by warm summers and cool winters with light to no snowfall. The average annual temperature in Ōmachi is 16.3 °C. The average annual rainfall is 1864 mm with September as the wettest month. The temperatures are highest on average in August, at around 27.1 °C, and lowest in January, at around 6.2 °C.

=== Demographics ===
Per Japanese census data, the population of Ōmachi is as shown below.

Historical population
Year	Pop.	±%
1940	20,938	—
1950	23,276	+11.2%
1960	20,427	−12.2%
1970	10,649	−47.9%
1980	9,776	−8.2%
1990	9,239	−5.5%
2000	8,503	−8.0%
2010	7,364	−13.4%
2020	6,293	−14.5%

== History ==
The area of Ōmachi is part of ancient Hizen Province. During the Edo period it was part of the holdings of Saga Domain until the Meiji restoration. The village of Ōmachi was established on April 1, 1889, with the creation of the modern municipalities system. Ōmachi was elevated to town status on January 1, 1936.

== Government ==
Ōmachi has a mayor-council form of government with a directly elected mayor and a unicameral town council of eight members. Ōmachi, together with the other municipalities in Kishima District contributes two members to the Saga Prefectural Assembly. In terms of national politics, the town is part of the Saga 2nd district of the lower house of the Diet of Japan.

== Economy ==
The main industries are agriculture (rice, wheat, cucumbers, strawberries, etc.) and livestock (chicken farming). The town once prospered as a coal-producing area due to the Kishima coal mine, but it closed in the 1960s due to changes in the energy situation.

== Education ==
Ōmachi has one public combined elementary/junior high school operated by the town government, and one public high school operated by the Saga Prefectural Board of Education.

== Transportation ==
=== Railway ===
JR Kyushu - Sasebo Line

JH Ōmachi

=== Highways ===
- National Route 34

== Sister cities ==
- Allendale, New Jersey, United States, since August 2, 1996
