= Kōhoku =

Kōhoku 江北町
- Town
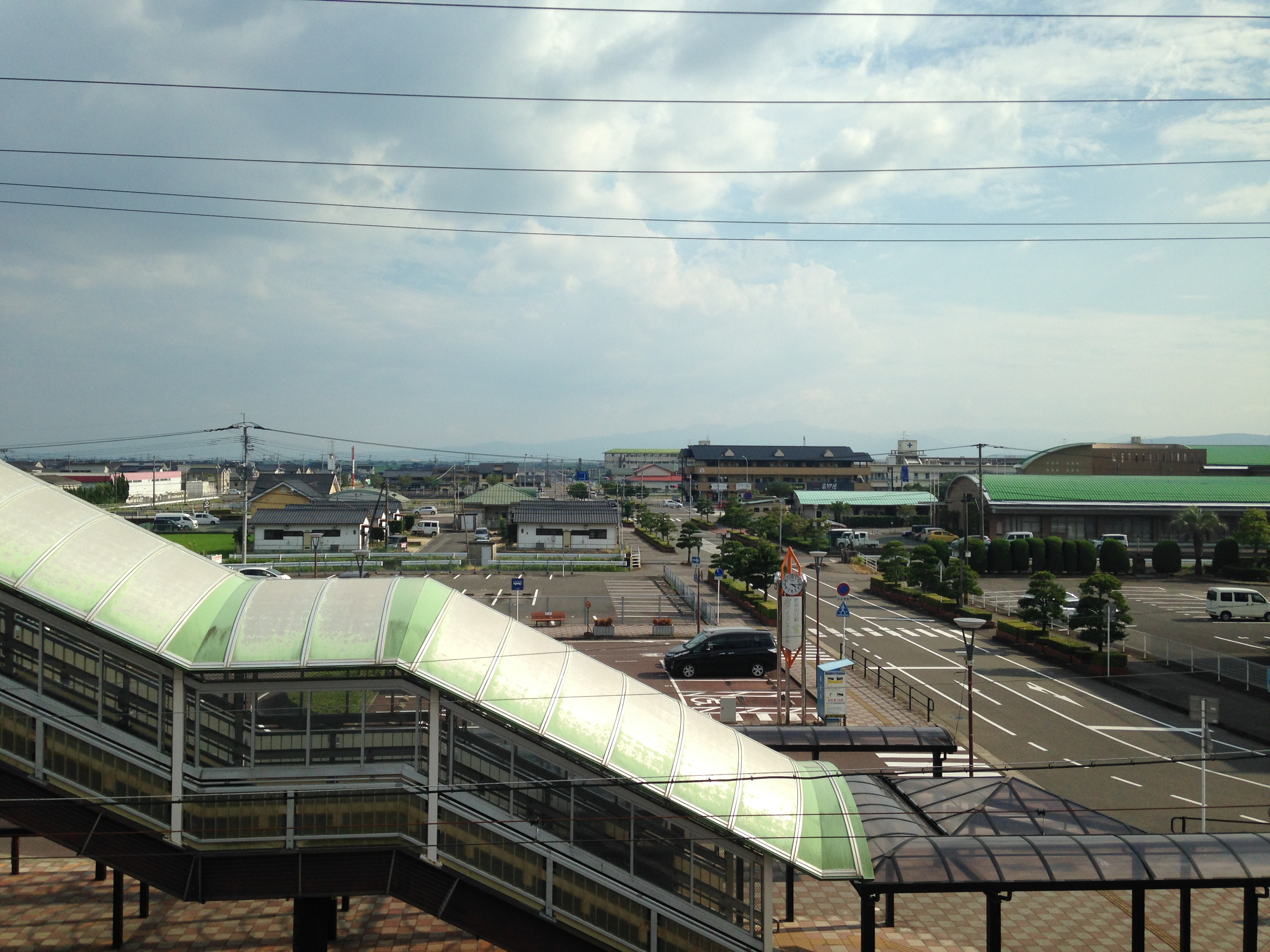
- View of Kōhoku Town

- Flag Emblem
- Interactive map of Kōhoku
- Location in Japan
- Coordinates: 33°13′14″N 130°9′26″E
- Country: Japan
- Region: Kyushu
- Prefecture: Saga
- District: Kishima

Government
  - Mayor: Kenichi Tanaka

Area
  - Total: 24.88 km^{2} (9.61 sq mi)

Population (May 31, 2024)
  - Total: 9,586
  - Density: 385.3/km^{2} (997.9/sq mi)
- Time zone: UTC+09:00 (JST)
- City hall address: 1651-1 Ōaza Yamaguchi, Kōhoku-chō, Kishima-gun, Saga-ken 849-0592
- Website: Official website
- Symbols
- Flower: Narcissus
- Tree: Ilex integra

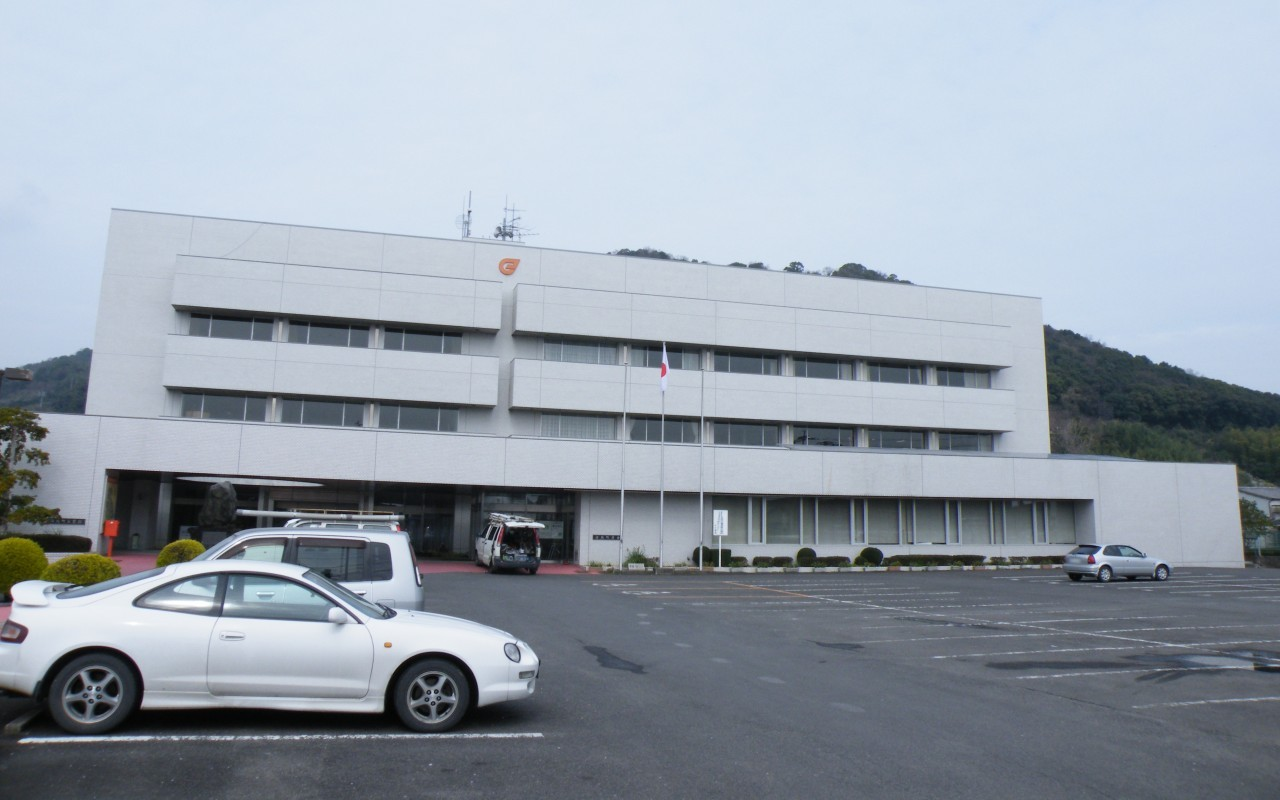
Kōhoku Town Hall

Kōhoku (江北町, Kōhoku-machi) is a town located in Kishima District, Saga Prefecture, Japan. It is known as a crossroads for railways and national highways, and as such has dubbed itself "the navel of Saga". As of 31 May 2024, the town had an estimated population of 9586 in 3715 households, and a population density of 750 persons per km^{2}. The total area of the town is 24.88 km^{2} (9.61 sq mi)

== Geography ==
- Mountains: The northern part of the city is gradually mountainous.
- Rivers: Rokkaku River, Ushizu River

=== Adjoining municipalities ===
Saga Prefecture

- Ogi
- Ōmachi
- Shiroishi
- Taku

=== Climate ===
Kōhoku has a humid subtropical climate (Köppen Cfa) characterized by warm summers and cool winters with light to no snowfall. The average annual temperature in Kōhoku is 16.6 °C. The average annual rainfall is 1902 mm with September as the wettest month. The temperatures are highest on average in August, at around 27.4 °C, and lowest in January, at around 6.5 °C.

=== Demographics ===
Per Japanese census data, the population of Kōhoku is as shown below.

Historical population
Year	Pop.	±%
1960	16,379	—
1970	10,546	−35.6%
1980	9,732	−7.7%
1990	9,483	−2.6%
2000	9,584	+1.1%
2010	9,515	−0.7%
2020	9,566	+0.5%

== History ==
The area of Kōhoku is part of ancient Hizen Province. During the Edo period it was part of the holdings of Saga Domain until the Meiji restoration. The village of Oda, Yamaguchi and Sarushi were established on April 1, 1889, with the creation of the modern municipalities system. The three villages merged on April 1, 1932, to form the village of Kōhoku. Kōhoku gained town status on April 1, 1952. On September 30, 1956, part of the village of Teisen (砥川村) from Ogi District merges with Kōhoku

== Government ==
Kōhoku has a mayor-council form of government with a directly elected mayor and a unicameral town council of 10 members. Kōhoku, together with the other municipalities in Kishima District contributes two members to the Saga Prefectural Assembly. In terms of national politics, the town is part of the Saga 2nd district of the lower house of the Diet of Japan.

== Economy ==
The local economy is overwhelming based on agriculture and livestock raising.

== Education ==
Kōhoku has one public elementary school and one public junior high schools operated by the town government. The town does not have a high school.

== Transportation ==
=== Railway ===
JR Kyushu - Nagasaki Main Line / Sasebo Line

JH Kōhoku

=== Highways ===
- National Route 34
- National Route 207
