= Sasebo Line =

Railway line in Kyushu, Japan

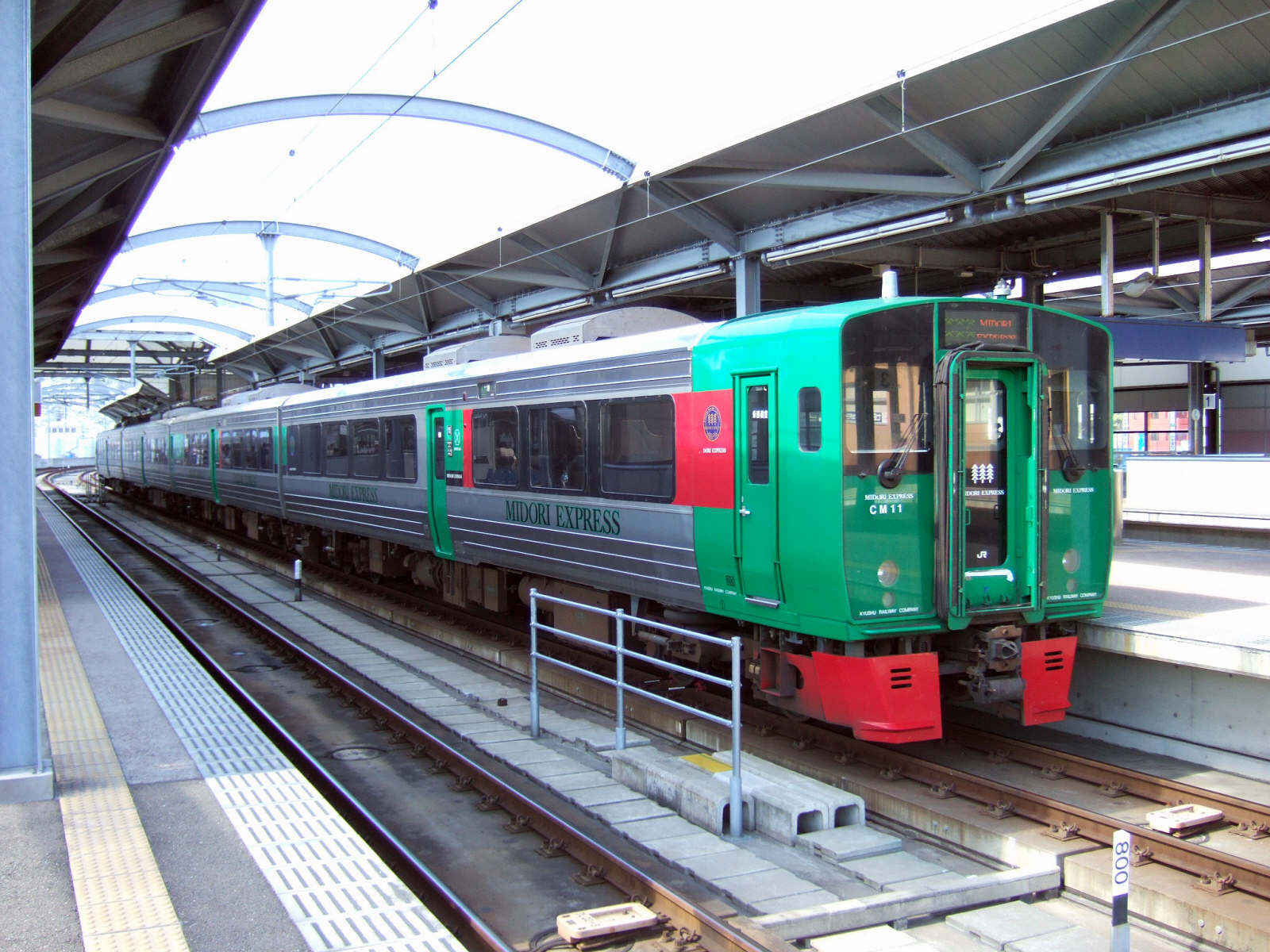
- Midori Express at Sasebo Station

Overview
- Native name: 佐世保線
- Owner: JR Kyushu
- Locale: Saga Prefecture and Nagasaki Prefecture, Japan
- Termini: Kōhoku Station; Sasebo Station
- Stations: 14

History
- Opened: 5 May 1895

Technical
- Line length: 48.8 km (30.3 mi)
- Track gauge: 1,067 mm (3 ft 6 in)
Route map
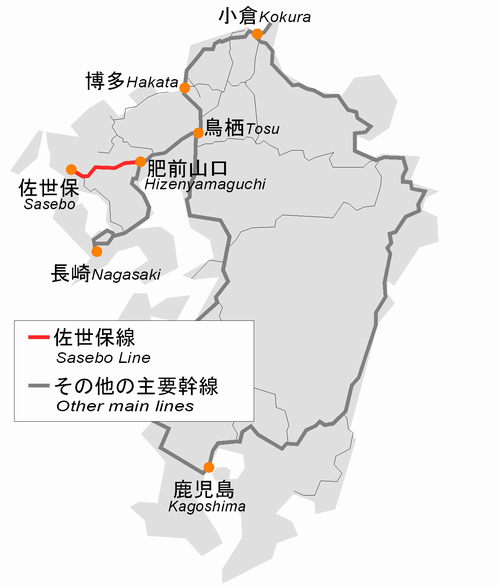

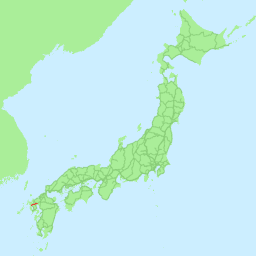
Map of Japan with the Sasebo Line highlighted in red

The Sasebo Line (佐世保線, Sasebo-sen) is a railway line in Kyushu, Japan, operated by the Kyushu Railway Company (JR Kyushu). It connects Kōhoku Station in Kōhoku, Saga Prefecture to Sasebo Station in Sasebo, Nagasaki Prefecture. It is part of the route connecting Sasebo with Saga and Fukuoka. The line generally runs parallel to National Routes 34 and 35. From 1898 to 1934 the Kōhoku - Haiki section was part of the original Nagasaki Main Line.

== History ==
The Kyushu Railway Co. opened the Yamaguchi (present-day Kōhoku) - Takeo (present-day Takeo-Onsen) section in 1895 as part of the original Nagasaki Main Line. It was extended to Haiki in 1897, and to Sasebo the following year. The company was nationalised in 1907.

In 1934 the Hizen-Yamaguchi (present-day Kōhoku) - Isahaya line opened as the new Nagasaki Main line, with the line being renamed the Sasebo Line. The section extending beyond Sasebo was separated from the line and became the Matsuura Line.

The entire line was electrified in 1976. Freight service ceased between Haiki and Sasebo in 1985, between Arita and Haiki in 1987 and on the remainder of the line in 1996.

The section between Ōmachi and Takahashi was double-tracked to accommodate the 'Relay Kamome' limited express service. This service connects with the Nishi Kyushu Shinkansen, which opened between Takeo-Onsen and Nagasaki in September 2022, while the route between Takeo-Onsen and Shin-Tosu remains undecided.

=== Former connecting lines ===
- Takahashi station - Yutoku Railway Co. opened a 24.2 km 915mm (3') gauge line to Yutoku Inari Shrine between 1904 and 1907, and a 1.5 km branch line to the south of Hyakkan Bridge in 1909. Both lines closed in 1931. The 9.8 km 1067mm gauge Hizen Electric Railway Co. line to Ureshino, electrified at 600 VDC, connected to this line and operated between 1915 and 1931.
- Sasebo station - A 5 km line to a US Forces Japan oil storage facility operated between 1950 and 1978.

== Route data ==
- Operators and distances
  - JR Kyushu
    - From Kōhoku to Sasebo: 48.8 km (30.3 mi)
  - JR Freight
    - From Kōhoku to Arita: 28.2 km (17.5 mi)
- Track gauge: 1,067 mm (3 ft 6 in)
- Stations: 14
- Double-track: Ōmachi - Takahashi
- Electrified track: Whole line
- Maximum speed: 120 km/h (75 mph)

== Rolling stock ==
- 783 series (whole line, Limited express Midori/Huis Ten Bosch)
- 787 series (between Kohoku and Takeo-Onsen, Limited Express Relay Kamome)
- 885 series (between Kōhoku and Takeo-Onsen, Limited Express Relay Kamome)
- 415 series (whole line)
- 813 series (between Kōhoku and Haiki)
- 817 series (whole line)
- YC1 Series DMUs (between Sasebo and Haiki, Rapid Seaside Liner)
- KiHa 200 Series DMUs (between Sasebo and Haiki, Rapid Seaside Liner)

== Stations ==
●： Station stop

| Station | Japanese | Distance from Kōhoku | Transfers | Location | |
|---|---|---|---|---|---|
| Kōhoku | 江北 | 0.0 | JH Nagasaki Main Line | Kōhoku | Saga Prefecture |
| Ōmachi | 大町 | 5.1 | | Ōmachi | Saga Prefecture |
| Kitagata | 北方 | 7.4 | | Takeo | Saga Prefecture |
| Takahashi | 高橋 | 11.4 | | Takeo | Saga Prefecture |
| Takeo Onsen | 武雄温泉 | 13.7 | ■ Nishi Kyushu Shinkansen | Takeo | Saga Prefecture |
| Nagao | 永尾 | 18.3 | | Takeo | Saga Prefecture |
| Mimasaka | 三間坂 | 21.5 | | Takeo | Saga Prefecture |
| Kami-Arita | 上有田 | 25.7 | | Arita | Saga Prefecture |
| Arita | 有田 | 28.2 | ■ Nishi-Kyūshū Line | Arita | Saga Prefecture |
| Mikawachi | 三河内 | 35.7 | | Sasebo | Nagasaki Prefecture |
| Haiki | 早岐 | 39.9 | ■ Ōmura Line | Sasebo | Nagasaki Prefecture |
| Daitō | 大塔 | 42.6 | | Sasebo | Nagasaki Prefecture |
| Hiu | 日宇 | 45.5 | | Sasebo | Nagasaki Prefecture |
| Sasebo | 佐世保 | 48.8 | ■ Nishi-Kyūshū Line | Sasebo | Nagasaki Prefecture |
