= Rokkaku River =

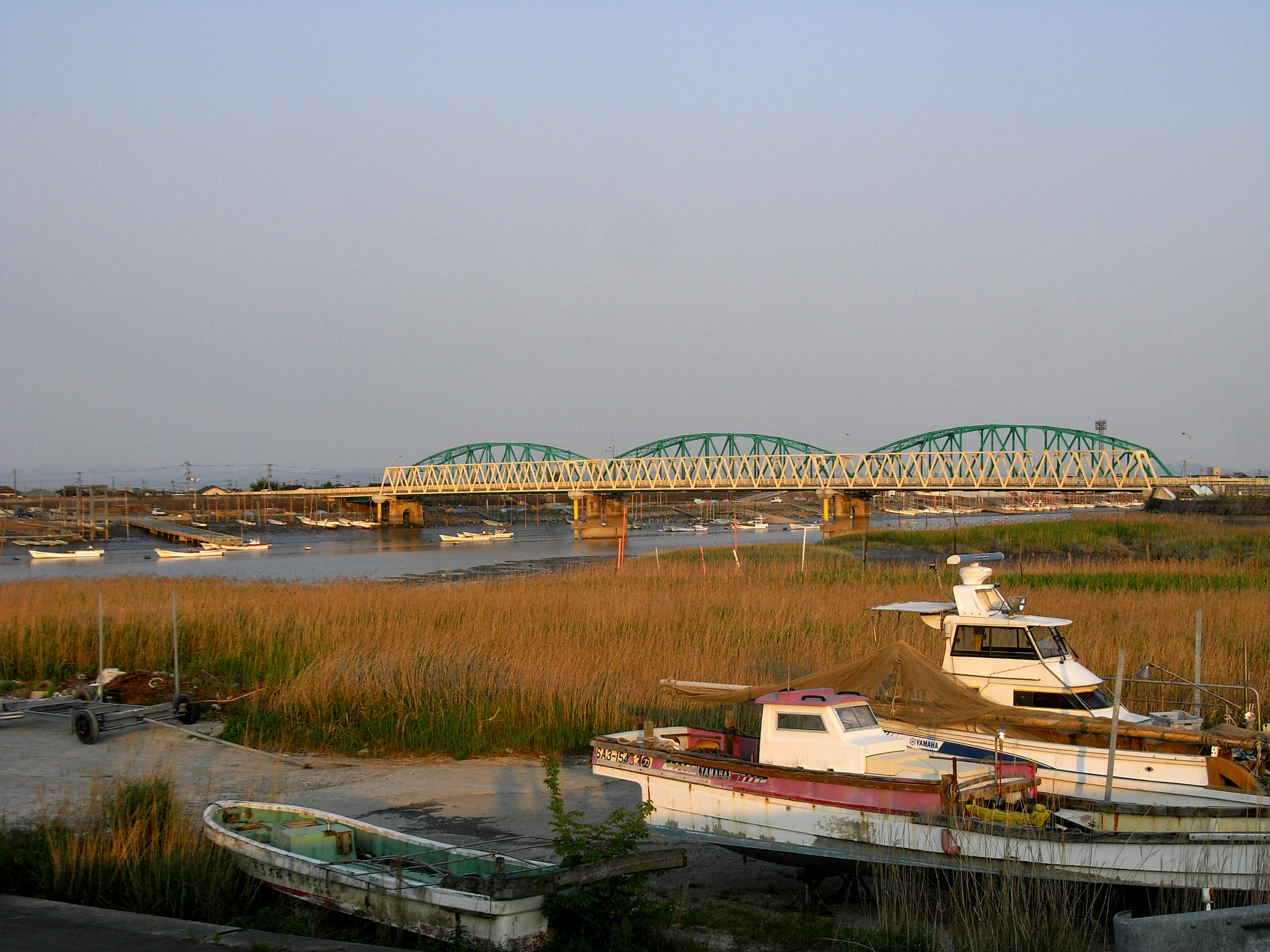

- Location within Japan
- Native name: 六角川 (Japanese)

Location
- Country: Japan
- Prefecture: Saga Prefecture

Physical characteristics
- Source
  - coordinates: 33.1546°N 129.9443°E
- Mouth: Ariake Sea
  - coordinates: 33.1920°N 130.2310°E}
  - elevation: 0 m
- Length: 47 km (29 mi)
- Basin size: 341 km^{2} (132 sq mi)

The Rokkaku River (六角川, Rokkakugawa) is a river on the island of Kyushu, flowing through the Saga Prefecture.

The river rises on the slopes of Mount Jinroku (神六山, 447 m; 1,467 ft), located in the Takeo city. In the mountains it joins Takeo River, then flows through the Shiroishi plain. After the confluence with Ushizu River it discharges into Ariake Sea, a part of East China Sea.

The Rokkaku river is 47 km (29 mi) long and the catchment area is 341 km^{2} (132 sq mi); the population of the catchment is about 120,000. It is designated as a Class A river by the Ministry of Land, Infrastructure, Transport and Tourism (MLIT).

About 37% of the catchment is covered by natural vegetation, about 50% agricultural lands, and about 13% is built up.

The bottom gradient is about 1/60 in the upper reaches, 1/150–1/1000 in the middle, and 1/1500–1/45000 in the lower part.

In the 20th century devastating floods occurred in years 1953, 1967, and 1990. The 1953 flood caused the death of 3 and submersion of 14,000 homes.
