= Kōhoku Station (Saga) =

Railway station in Kōhoku, Saga Prefecture, Japan

Kōhoku Station 江北駅
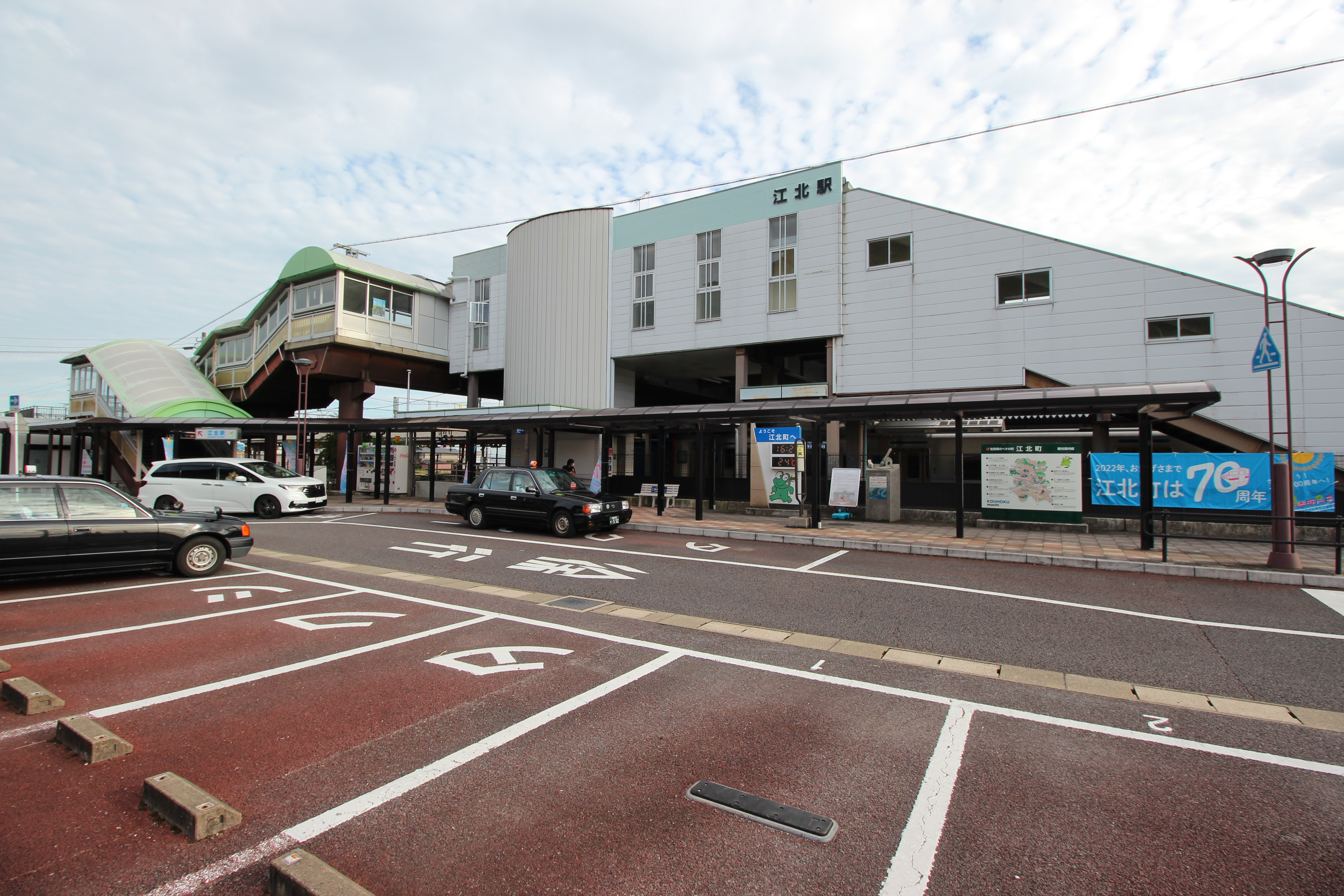
- Kōhoku Station in September 2022

General information
- Location: Yamaguchi, Kōhoku-chō, Kishima-gun, Saga-ken 849-0501; Japan
- Coordinates: 33°13′8.6″N 130°9′40.4″E
- Operator: JR Kyushu
- Lines: JH Nagasaki Main Line; ■ Sasebo Line
- Distance: 39.6 km from Tosu (Nagasaki Main Line); 0.0 km (starting point of the Sasebo Line)
- Platforms: 1 side + 2 island platforms
- Tracks: 5 + several passing loops and sidings

Construction
- Structure type: At grade
- Parking: Available
- Accessible: Yes - elevators to platforms

Other information
- Status: Staffed (Midori no Madoguchi) (outsourced)
- Website: Official website

History
- Opened: 5 May 1895
- Former names: Yamaguchi (to 1 March 1913) Hizen-Yamaguchi (to 23 September 2022)

Passengers
- FY2019: 1,163 daily
- Rank: 145th (among JR Kyushu stations)

Services
Preceding station	JR Kyushu	Following station
Hizen-Shiroishi towards Nagasaki	Nagasaki Line	Ushizu towards Tosu
Takeo-Onsen Terminus	Relay Kamome	Saga towards Hakata
Takeo-Onsen towards Sasebo or Huis Ten Bosch	Midori and Huis Ten Bosch	Saga towards Hakata
Ōmachi towards Sasebo	Sasebo Line	Terminus
Location
- Location within Saga Prefecture Location within Japan

Kōhoku Station (Japanese: 江北駅, Hepburn: Kōhoku-eki) is a passenger railway station located in the town of Kōhoku, Kishima District, Saga Prefecture, Japan. It is operated by JR Kyushu and is a junction between the Nagasaki Main Line and the Sasebo Line.

== Lines ==
The station is served by the Nagasaki Main Line and is located 39.6 km from the starting point of the line at Tosu. In addition the station is also the eastern terminus of the 48.8 kilometer Sasebo Line.

Besides the local services on both lines, the following JR Kyushu limited express services also stop at the station:

- Relay Kamome: Hakata–Takeo-Onsen (transfer point for Nishi Kyushu Shinkansen service to/from Nagasaki)
- Midori: Hakata–Sasebo
- Huis ten Bosch: Hakata–Huis ten Bosch

== Station layout ==
The station consists of a side platform and two island platforms serving five tracks at grade. There is a passing loop between platforms 1 and 2 and several more passing loops/sidings south of the station beyond platform 5. The station is an elevated structure where the station facilities are located on a bridge which spans the platforms and which has entrances to the south and north of the tracks. Located on the bridge are a waiting room, a staffed ticket window and the ticket gates. Elevators give access to the bridge from both the south and north station entrances. After the ticket gates, elevators lead down to the various platforms.

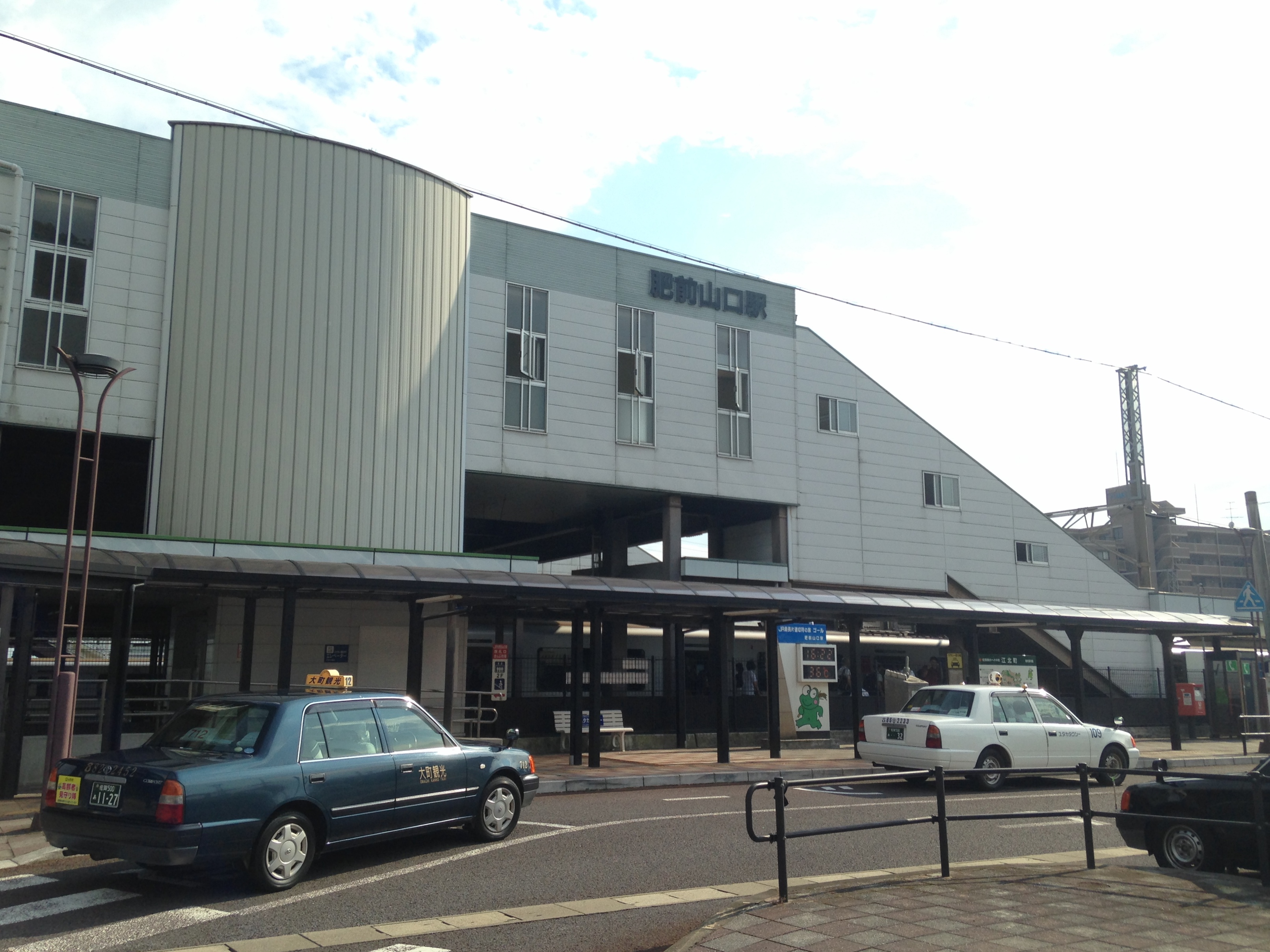
The north entrance of the station.

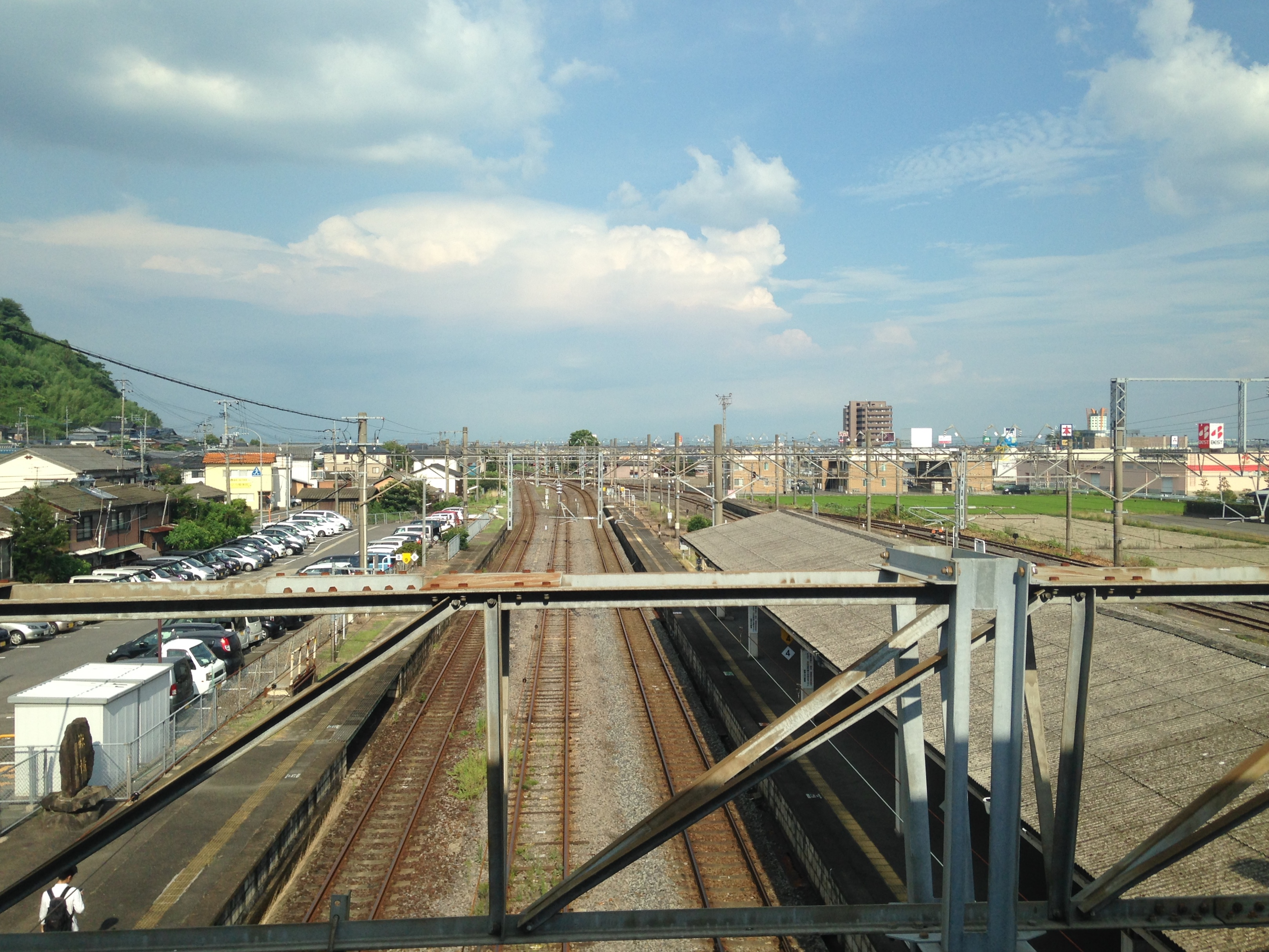
View of the platforms and tracks looking east. Note the passing loop (centre). Platforms 4 and 5 and the sidings south of them can be seen to the extreme right.

=== Platforms ===
Tracks
1	Nagasaki Line	To Hizen-Kashima・Isahaya / To Saga・Tosu
1	Sasebo Line	To Takeo-Onsen・Haiki
2	Relay Kamome, Midori, Huis ten Bosch	To Saga・Hakata
2	Nagasaki Line	To Saga・Tosu
3	Relay Kamome	To Takeo-Onsen
3	Midori	To Takeo-Onsen・Sasebo
3	Huis ten Bosch	To Takeo-Onsen・Huis ten Bosch
3	Nagasaki Line	To Hizen-Kashima・Isahaya / To Saga・Tosu
3	Sasebo Line	To Takeo-Onsen・Haiki
4	Nagasaki Line	To Hizen-Kashima・Isahaya
4	Sasebo Line	To Takeo-Onsen・Haiki
5	Nagasaki Line	To Hizen-Kashima・Isahaya / To Saga・Tosu
5	Sasebo Line	To Takeo-Onsen

== History ==
The private Kyushu Railway had opened a track from Tosu to Saga on 20 August 1891. In the next phase of expansion, the track was extended westwards with Takeo (today Takeo-Onsen) opening as the new western terminus on 5 May 1895. Hizen-Yamaguchi (then known as Yamaguchi) was opened on the same day as an intermediate station along the new stretch of track. When the Kyushu Railway was nationalized on 1 July 1907, Japanese Government Railways (JGR) took over control of the station. On 12 October 1909, the station became part of the Nagasaki Main Line, which at that time, ran through Takeo and Haiki to Nagasaki. On 1 March 1913, the station was renamed Hizen-Yamaguchi. On 1 December 1934, the stretch of track from Hizen-Yamaguchi through Takeo, Haiki to Sasebo was designated the Sasebo Line and Hizen-Yamaguchi replaced Haiki as the starting point. A new track branching from Hizen-Yamaguchi through Hizen-Ōura to Nagasaki built from 1930 to 1934 was designated the Nagasaki Main Line. With the privatization of Japanese National Railways (JNR), the successor of JGR, on 1 April 1987, control of the station passed to JR Kyushu. On 23 September 2022, the station was renamed Kōhoku.

== Passenger statistics ==
In fiscal 2020, the station was used by an average of 1163 passengers daily (boarding passengers only), and it ranked 145th among the busiest stations of JR Kyushu.

== Surroundings ==
=== North ===
- Kōhoku City Hall
- Yamaguchi Post Office
- Substitute Kannon
- Tōshō-ji

=== South ===
- Kōhoku Jusco
- Kōhoku Kindergarten
- Kōhoku Elementary School
- Kōhoku Junior High School
- Japan National Route 34

== See also ==
- List of railway stations in Japan
